= Timbaland production discography =

Projects supervised by American producer

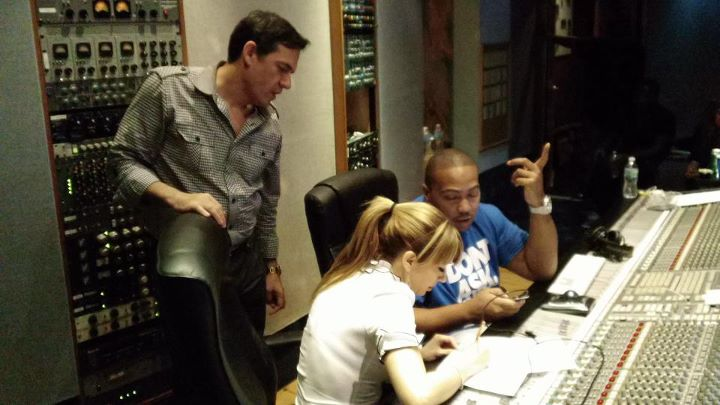
Timbaland (right) in a recording session with singer Noelia (middle) and actor Jorge Reynoso (left) in 2012

Timothy Mosley is an American record producer better known as Timbaland. This discography lists the recorded performances, writing and production credits as Timothy Mosley, as Timothy Zachery Mosley, as Timbaland or DJ Timmy Tim. Song names that are bold are singles, album names/releases are in italics.

== Albums produced ==
Album	Year	Artist
4 All the Sistas Around da World	1994	Sista
Ginuwine... The Bachelor	1996	Ginuwine
Supa Dupa Fly	1997	Missy Elliott
Welcome to Our World	1997	Timbaland & Magoo
Tim's Bio: Life from da Bassment	1998	Timbaland
100% Ginuwine	1999	Ginuwine
Da Real World	1999	Missy Elliott
Miss E... So Addictive	2001	Missy Elliott
Indecent Proposal	2001	Timbaland & Magoo
Girl Interrupted	2002	Ms. Jade
Under Construction	2002	Missy Elliott
Deliverance	2003	Bubba Sparxxx
This Is Not a Test!	2003	Missy Elliott
Under Construction, Part II	2003	Timbaland & Magoo
Afrodisiac	2004	Brandy
Loose	2006	Nelly Furtado
FutureSex/LoveSounds	2006	Justin Timberlake
Shock Value	2007	Timbaland
Scream	2009	Chris Cornell
Timbaland Presents Shock Value II	2009	Timbaland
The 20/20 Experience	2013	Justin Timberlake
The 20/20 Experience – 2 of 2	2013	Justin Timberlake
King Stays King	2015	Timbaland

== 1993 ==
=== Jodeci - Diary of a Mad Band ===
(Produced with DeVante Swing)

- 09. "In the Meanwhile" (featuring Timbaland)
- 11. "Sweaty" (featuring Missy Elliott)

== 1994 ==
=== Jodeci - What About Us 12" ===
- A2. "What About Us (Swing Mob Timbaland Remix)" (feat. Magoo)

=== Sista - 4 All the Sistas Around da World (shelved) ===
(All tracks produced with DeVante Swing)

- 01. "Intro Talk"
- 02. "Hip Hop"
- 03. "Slow Down" (feat. DeVante)
- 04. "Wfro"
- 05. "Sweat You Down"
- 06. "DeVante At The Payphone"
- 07. "Find My Love"
- 08. "I Wanna Know"
- 09. "Hit U Up"
- 10. "125th Street"
- 11. "Big Shann & Timbaland A Train Stop (Skit)"
- 12. "I Don't Mind" (feat. Timbaland)
- 13. "Secret Admirer"
- 14. "Sista Bounce"
- 15. "Swing Thing" (feat. DeVante)
- 16. "Brand New"
- 17. "I Wanna Be Wit U"
- 18. "Good Thang"
- 19. "Feel Of Your Lips" (feat. Mary J. Blige, Virginia Williams & K-Ci Hailey)
- 20. "Sista Mack"
- 00. "Brand New (Timbaland's Beemer Remix)"

=== Usher - Usher ===
(Produced With DeVante Swing)

- 03. "Can U Get Wit It"

=== Various artists - Above the Rim (soundtrack) ===
(Produced With DeVante Swing)

- 16. "Blowed Away" - B-Rezell

== 1995 ==
=== Jodeci - The Show, the After Party, the Hotel ===
(Produced With DeVante Swing)

- 02. "Bring on da' Funk" (feat. Timbaland)
- 18. "Time & Place"

=== Various artists - Dangerous Minds (soundtrack) ===
(Produced With DeVante Swing)

- 05. "True O.G." - Mr. Dalvin & Static
- 09. "It's Alright" - Sista & Craig Mack
- 11. "Gin & Juice" - DeVante

== 1996 ==
=== 702 - Steelo CDS ===
- 00. "Steelo (Timbaland Remix)" [feat. Timbaland & Missy Elliott]
- 00. "Steelo (Cali Mix)" [feat. Timbaland]

=== Aaliyah - If Your Girl Only Knew CDS ===
- 03. "If Your Girl Only Knew (The New Remix)"

=== Aaliyah – One in a Million ===
- 01. Beats for da Streets (Intro) [featuring Missy Elliott]
- 02. "Hot Like Fire" (featuring Timbaland)
- 03. "One in a Million"
- 05. "If Your Girl Only Knew"
- 08. "4 Page Letter"
- 13. "Heartbroken"
- 14. "Never Comin' Back"
- 15. "Ladies in da House" (featuring Timbaland and Missy Elliott)
- 17. "Came to Give Love (Outro)" (featuring Timbaland)

=== Babyface - This Is for the Lover in You (The Remix CD) ===
- 00. "This Is for the Lover in You (Timbaland Remix)" [feat. LL Cool J]

=== Ginuwine - Ginuwine... the Bachelor ===
- 01. "Intro"
- 02. "Pony / Interlude"
- 03. "Tell Me Do U Wanna / Interlude"
- 04. "Holler / Interlude" (feat. Nikki and Virginia Slim)
- 05. "Hello"
- 06. "Lonely Daze"
- 07. "Ginuwine 4 Ur Mind / Interlude"
- 08. "Only When Ur Lonely / Interlude"
- 09. "I'll Do Anything / I'm Sorry" (feat. Timbaland)
- 10 ."World Is So Cold / Interlude"
- 11. "When Doves Cry / Interlude"
- 12. "G. Thang / Interlude" (feat. Missy Elliott and Magoo)
- 13. "550 What? / Interlude" (feat. Timbaland)

=== Pony CDS ===
- 05. "Pony (Ride It Remix)" [feat. Timbaland]

=== Terri & Monica - Sexuality (If You Take Your Love) CDS ===
- 00. "Sexuality (If You Take Your Love) (Timbaland Street Remix)" [feat. Missy Elliott]

== 1997 ==
=== Aaliyah - 4 Page Letter CDS ===
- 02. "4 Page Letter (Main Mix)"
- 03. "4 Page Letter (Quiet Storm Mix)"
- 04. "Death of a Playa" (featuring Rashad Haughton)

=== Aaliyah - Hot Like Fire Maxi CDS ===
- 03. "Hot Like Fire (Timbaland's Groove Remix)" (feat. Timbaland & Missy Elliott)
- 04. "Hot Like Fire (Feel My Horns Mix)"

=== Adina Howard - Welcome to Fantasy Island ===
- 07. "Sexual Needs" (co-produced by Daniel "Day" Pearson)

=== Babyface - How Come, How Long CDS ===
- 02. "Everytime I Close My Eyes (Timbaland Remix)" (feat. Mariah Carey & Playa)

=== Ginuwine - Only When Ur Lonely CDS ===
- 02. "Only When Ur Lonely (Remix)" (feat. Timbaland)

=== Missy Elliott - Supa Dupa Fly ===
- 01. "Busta's Intro" (feat. Busta Rhymes)
- 02. "Hit Em wit da Hee" (feat. Lil' Kim and Mocha)
- 03. "Sock It 2 Me" (feat. Da Brat)
- 04. "The Rain (Supa Dupa Fly)"
- 05. "Beep Me 911" (feat. 702, Magoo)
- 06. "They Don't Wanna Fuck wit Me" (feat. Timbaland)
- 07. "Pass da Blunt" (feat. Timbaland)
- 08. "Bite Our Style (Interlude)"
- 09. "Friendly Skies" (feat. Ginuwine)
- 10. "Best Friends" (feat. Aaliyah)
- 11. "Don't Be Comin' (In My Face)"
- 12. "Izzy Izzy Ahh"
- 13. "Why You Hurt Me"
- 14. "I'm Talkin'"
- 15. "Gettaway" (feat. Space & Nicole Wray)
- 16. "Busta's Outro" (feat. Busta Rhymes)

=== Snoop Dogg - Doggfather CDS ===
- 02. "Doggfather (Timbaland Remix)" [feat. Timbaland]

=== SWV - Release Some Tension / Booty Call (soundtrack) ===
- 05. "Can We" (featuring Missy Elliott)

=== Timbaland & Magoo - Welcome to Our World ===
- 01. "Beep Beep" (feat. Missy Elliott)
- 02. "Feel It"
- 03. "Up Jumps da' Boogie" (feat. Aaliyah and Missy Elliott)
- 04. "Clock Strikes"
- 05. "15 After da Hour"
- 06. "Ms. Parker" (feat. Love Jon)
- 07. "Luv 2 Luv U (Remix)" [feat. Shaunta Montgomery & Playa]
- 08. "Luv 2 Luv U" (feat. Playa, Static & St. Nick)
- 09. "Smoke in da Air" (feat. Playa)
- 11. "Intro Buddha" (feat. Buddah Brother, Big B & DJ Law)
- 12. "Peepin' My Style"
- 13. "Written' Rhymes" (feat. Troy Mitchell)
- 14. "Deep in Your Memory"
- 15. "Clock Strikes (Remix)"
- 15. "Sex Beat (Interlude)"
- 16. "Man Undercover" (feat. Aaliyah and Missy Elliott)
- 17. "Joy" (feat. Ginuwine, Black & Smokey) (produced with Smoke E. Digglera)
- 18. "Up Jumps da' Boogie (Remix)" [feat. Missy Elliott]

=== Usher - You Make Me Wanna... CDS ===
- B1. "You Make Me Wanna... (Timbaland Remix)" [feat. Timbaland]

=== Various artists - Money Talks (soundtrack) ===
- 05. "Money Talks" - Lil' Kim & Andrea Martin

=== Various Artists - Soul Food (soundtrack) ===
- 02. "What About Us?" - Total, Timbaland & Missy Elliott

=== Various Artists - Sprung (soundtrack) ===
- 07. "One in a Million (Remix)" - Aaliyah & Ginuwine

== 1998 ==
=== Boyz II Men - Can't Let Her Go CDS ===
- 00. "Can't Let Her Go (Timbaland Remix)"
- 00. "Can't Let Her Go (Timbaland Alternate Groove)"

=== Janet Jackson - Go Deep (Timbaland Spec Mixes) ===
- 00. "Go Deep (Timbaland Remix)" [feat. Timbaland and Missy Elliott]

=== Janet Jackson - I Get Lonely CDS ===
- 01. "I Get Lonely (TNT Remix)" [feat. BLACKstreet]

=== Jay-Z - Vol. 2... Hard Knock Life ===
- 05. "Nigga What, Nigga Who (Originator 99)" [feat. Big Jaz]
- 10. "Paper Chase" (feat. Foxy Brown)

=== Lil' Mo - 5 Minutes CDS ===
- 00. "5 Minutes (Timbaland Remix)" [feat. Missy Elliott]

=== Missy Elliott - Beep Me 911 CDS ===
- 04. "Beep Me 911 (Remix)" [feat. Magoo & 702]

=== Nicole Wray - Make It Hot (CDS) ===
- 06. "Make It Hot" (feat. Mocha, Missy Elliott)

=== Playa - Cheers 2 U ===
- 03. "All the Way"
- 02. "Don't Stop the Music"
- 04. "Everybody Wanna Luv Somebody" (co-produced by Smokey)
- 08. "Cheers 2 U"
- 09. "Ms. Parker" (feat. Missy Elliott)
- 10. "Top of the World"
- 12. "I'll B 2 C U"

=== Timbaland - Tim's Bio: Life from da Bassment ===
- 01. "Intro (Life from da Bassment)" (feat. T.K. Kirkland)
- 02. "I Get It On" (feat. Bassey)
- 03. "To My" (feat. Mad Skillz and Nas)
- 04. "Here We Come" feat. Magoo, Missy Elliott, Darryl Pearson and Playa)
- 05. "Wit' Yo Bad Self" (feat. Mad Skillz and Lisa Smith)
- 06. "Lobster & Shrimp" (feat. Jay-Z)
- 07. "What 'Cha Know About This" (feat. Mocha and Baby Blue)
- 08. "Can't Nobody" (feat. 1 Life 2 Live)
- 09. "What 'Cha Talkin' 'Bout" (feat. Magoo, Lil' Man and Static)
- 10. "Put 'em On" (feat. Crowds and Yoshamine)
- 11. "Phat Rabbit" (feat. Ludacris and Crowds)
- 12. "Who Am I" (feat. Twista)
- 13. "Talkin' on the Phone" (feat. Kelly Price and Missy Elliott)
- 14. "Keep It Real" (feat. Ginuwine)
- 15. "John Blaze" (feat. Aaliyah and Missy Elliott)
- 16. "Birthday" (feat. Playa)
- 17. "3-30 in the Morning" (feat. Virginia Williams and Missy Elliott)
- 18. "Outro (Life from da Basement)" (feat. T. K. Kirkland)
- 19. "Bringin' It" (feat. Troy Mitchel)

=== Total - Kima, Keisha, and Pam ===
- 01. "Trippin'" (feat. Missy Elliott) (co-produced by Mario Winans and Sean "Puffy")

=== Xscape - My Little Secret CDS ===
- 03. "My Little Secret (Timbaland Remix)"

=== Various Artists - Can't Hardly Wait (soundtrack) ===
- 05. "Hit Em wit da Hee (Remix)" - Missy Elliott, Mocha & Timbaland

=== Various artists - Dr. Dolittle (soundtrack) ===
- 03. "Are You That Somebody?" - Aaliyah
- 04. "Same Ol' G" - Ginuwine
- 05. "Lady Marmalade (Timbaland Remix)" - All Saints
- 06. "Da Funk" - Timbaland
- 08. "Your Dress" - Playa

=== Various artists - Why Do Fools Fall in Love (soundtrack) ===
- 01. "'Why Do Fools Fall in Love" - Gina Thompson & Mocha
- 02. "Get on the Bus" - Destiny's Child & Timbaland
- 03. "He Be Back" - Coko & Missy Elliott
- 05. "Get Contact" - Missy Elliot & Busta Rhymes
- 13. "What the Dealio" - Missy Elliot & Total

== 1999 ==
=== Ginuwine - 100% Ginuwine ===
- 01. "Little Kidz"
- 02. "Little Man's Bangin Lude"
- 03. "What's So Different?"
- 04. "So Anxious"
- 05. "None of Ur Friends Business"/"Interlude"
- 06. "Wait a Minute"
- 08. "Do You Remember"/"Interlude"
- 09. "No. 1 Fan"
- 10. "Final Warning"/"Interlude" (featuring Aaliyah)
- 11. "I'm Crying Out"
- 12. "Two Sides to a Story"
- 13. "Same Ol' G"
- 15. "Toe 2 Toe"

=== Jay-Z - Vol. 3... Life and Times of S. Carter ===
- 06. "It's Hot (Some Like It Hot)"
- 07. "Snoopy Track" (featuring Juvenile)
- 11. "Big Pimpin'" (featuring UGK)
- 13. "Come and Get Me"

=== Lenny Kravitz - American Woman CDS ===
- 03. "American Woman (Timbaland Remix)"

=== Method Man - Break Ups 2 Make Ups (Promo 12") ===
- 01. "Break Ups 2 Make Up (Remix)"

=== Missy Elliott - Da Real World ===
- 01. "Mysterious" (Intro)"
- 02. "Beat Biters"
- 03. "Busa Rhyme" (featuring Eminem)
- 04. "All n My Grill" (featuring Big Boi and Nicole Wray)
- 05. "Dangerous Mouths" (featuring Redman)
- 06. "Hot Boyz"
- 07. "You Don't Know" (featuring Lil' Mo)
- 08. "Mr. D.J." (featuring Lady Saw)
- 09. "Checkin' for You (Interlude)" (featuring Lil' Kim)
- 10. "Stickin' Chickens" (featuring Aaliyah and Da Brat)
- 11. "Smooth Chick"
- 12. "We Did It"
- 13. "Throw Your Hands Up (Interlude)" (featuring Lil' Kim)
- 14. "She's a Bitch"
- 15. "U Can't Resist" (featuring Juvenile and B.G.)
- 16. "Crazy Feelings" (featuring Beyoncé)
- 17. "Religious Blessings" (Outro)
- 00. "All n My Grill (European Version)" (featuring MC Solaar)
- 00. "Hot Boyz (Remix)" (featuring Nas, Eve, Q-Tip & Lil Mo)

=== Nas - I Am... ===
- 08. "You Won't See Me Tonight" (featuring Aaliyah)

=== Nas - Nastradamus ===
- 14. "You Owe Me" (featuring Ginuwine)

=== Various artists - Austin Powers: The Spy Who Shagged Me (soundtrack) ===
- 05. "Word Up" - Mel B

=== Various artists - The PJs (soundtrack) ===
- 02. "Talkin' Trash" - Timbaland & Bassy

== 2000 ==
=== Torrey Carter - The Life I Live (shelved) ===
- 06. "We Gon' Do"
- 09. "Same 'Ol" (featuring Missy Elliott)

=== Da Brat - Unrestricted ===
- 01. "Intro" (featuring Millie Jackson and Twista) (produced with Jermaine Dupri)

=== DJ Clue? - Backstage: Music Inspired by the Film ===
- 03. "In the Club" - Beanie Sigel

=== K-Ci & JoJo - X ===
- 05. "Game Face" (produced with Static Major)

=== The LOX - We Are the Streets ===
- 15. "Ryde or Die, Bitch" (featuring Timbaland and Eve)

=== Mack 10 - The Paper Route ===
- 03. "Nobody" (featuring Westside Connection and Timbaland)

=== Memphis Bleek - The Understanding ===
- 13. "Is That Your Chick (The Lost Verses)" [featuring Jay-Z, Twista and Missy Elliott]

=== Snoop Dogg - Tha Last Meal ===
- 03. "Snoop Dogg (What's My Name Pt. 2)"
- 07. "Set It Off" (featuring MC Ren, The Lady of Rage, Ice Cube, Nate Dogg and Kurupt)

=== Take 5 - Against All Odds ===
- 02. "Hottie"

=== Various artists - Nutty Professor II: The Klumps (soundtrack) ===
- 02. "Hey Papi" - Jay-Z, Amil & Memphis Bleek

=== Various artists - Romeo Must Die (soundtrack) ===
- 01. "Try Again" - Aaliyah
- 05. "We At It Again" - Timbaland & Magoo featuring Static Major & Sebastian
- 06. "Are You Feelin' Me?" - Aaliyah
- 08. "Simply Irresistible" - Ginuwine
- 00. "Try Again (Remix)" - Aaliyah (featuring Sincere & Sebastian)

== 2001 ==
=== Aaliyah - Aaliyah ===
- 01. "We Need a Resolution" (featuring Timbaland)
- 04. "More Than a Woman"
- 06. "I Care 4 U"

=== Bubba Sparxxx - Dark Days, Bright Nights ===
- 01. "Take Off"
- 02. "Ugly"
- 04. "Bubba Talk"
- 05. "Lovely" (featuring Timbaland)
- 08. "Get Right"
- 09. "Open Wide" (featuring Sebastian)
- 11. "Twerk a Little" (featuring Timbaland)
- 00. "Ugly (Remix)" (featuring Ms. Jade)

=== Fabolous- Ghetto Fabolous ===
- 08. "Right Now & Later On"

=== Various artists - Exit Wounds (soundtrack) ===
- 14. "Hell Yeah (Remix)" - Outsiderz 4 Life

=== Nelly Furtado - Turn Off the Light (CDS) ===
- 02. "Turn Off the Light" (Remix) [featuring Timbaland and Ms. Jade]

=== Ginuwine - The Life ===
- 09. "That's How I Get Down" (featuring Ludacris)
- 19. "So Anxious (Timbaland's Anxiety Pt. 2)" (Limited Edition Bonus Track)

=== Jadakiss - Kiss tha Game Goodbye ===
- 09. "Nasty Girl" (featuring Carl Thomas)

=== Jay-Z - The Blueprint ===
- 07. "Hola' Hovito"

=== Limp Bizkit - New Old Songs ===
- 02. "Take a Look Around" (featuring E-40 and 8-Ball)
- 07. "Rearranged" (featuring Bubba Sparxxx)

=== Ludacris - Word of Mouf ===
- 02. "Rollout (My Business)"

=== Missy Elliott - Miss E... So Addictive ===
(All tracks produced with Missy Elliott)

- 02. "Dog in Heat" (featuring Method Man & Redman)
- 03. "One Minute Man" (featuring Ludacris) (produced with Big Tank)
- 04. "Lick Shots"
- 05. "Get Ur Freak On"
- 06. "Scream a.k.a. Itchin'" (featuring Timbaland)
- 07. "Old School Joint"
- 08. "Take Away" (featuring Ginuwine) (produced with Craig Brockman)
- 09. "4 My People" (featuring Eve) (produced with Nisan Stewart and D-Man)
- 10. "Bus-a-Bus" (Interlude) (featuring Busta Rhymes)
- 11. "Whatcha Gon' Do" (featuring Timbaland)
- 12. "Step Off"
- 13. "X-Tasy"
- 14. "Slap! Slap! Slap!" (featuring Da Brat & Jade)

=== Petey Pablo - Diary of a Sinner: 1st Entry ===
- 03. "Raise Up"
- 04. "I" (featuring Timbaland)
- 05. "I Told Y'all"
- 18. "Raise Up" (All Cities Remix)

=== Ruff Ryders - Ryde or Die Vol. 3: In the "R" We Trust ===
- 03. "They Ain't Ready" - Jadakiss and Bubba Sparxxx

=== Southernaire Allstars - I Believe (CDS) ===
- 01. "I Believe" (feat. Static)

=== Timbaland & Magoo - Indecent Proposal ===
- 01. "Intro" (featuring DJ S&S)
- 02. "Drop" (featuring Fatman Scoop)
- 03. "All Y'all" (featuring Tweet and Sebastian)
- 04. "It's Your Night" (featuring Sin and Sebastian)
- 05. "Indian Carpet" (featuring Static Major)
- 06. "Party People" (featuring Jay-Z and Twista)
- 07. "People Like Myself" (featuring Static Major and Sebastian)
- 08. "Voice Mail" (Interlude) (featuring Michelle Robinson) (produced with Craig Brockman)
- 09. "Serious" (featuring Petey Pablo and Sebastian)
- 10. "Roll Out" (featuring Petey Pablo and Sebastian)
- 11. "Love Me" (featuring Tweet and Petey Pablo) (produced with Craig Brockman)
- 12. "Baby Bubba" (featuring Petey Pablo)
- 13. "In Time" (featuring Ms. Jade and Mad Skillz)
- 14. "Mr. Richards" (Interlude) (featuring Petey Pablo)
- 15. "Considerate Brotha" (featuring Ludacris)
- 16. "Beat Club" (featuring Sin, Troy Mitchell and Sebastian)
- 17. "I Am Music" (featuring Aaliyah and Static Major)

=== Various artists - Moulin Rouge! Music from Baz Luhrmann's Film ===
- 09. "Diamond Dogs" - Beck

== 2002 ==
=== Aaliyah – I Care 4 U ===
- 06. "Don't Know What to Tell Ya"

=== Birdman - Birdman ===
- 08. "Baby You Can Do It" (featuring Toni Braxton)

=== Cavie - Bouncin' Down the Boulevard / Dr. Kevorkian (CDS) ===
- 01. "Bouncin' Down the Boulevard" (feat. Timbaland)

=== Da Hood - Mack 10 Presents da Hood ===
- 13. "Life as a Gangsta" (featuring Birdman and TQ)

=== Destiny's Child - This Is the Remix ===
- 04. "Say My Name" (Timbaland Remix) [feat. Static Major]

=== Floetry - Say Yes (CDS) ===
- 00. "Say Yes (Timbaland Remix)"

=== Jay-Z – The Blueprint 2: The Gift & The Curse ===
- 06. "What They Gonna Do" (featuring Sean Paul)
- 10. "The Bounce" (featuring Kanye West) (produced with Kanye West)
- 20. "2 Many Hoes"

=== Missy Elliott - Under Construction ===
(All tracks produced with Missy Elliott)

- 01. "Intro/Go to the Floor"
- 02. "Bring the Pain" (featuring Method Man)
- 03. "Gossip Folks" (featuring Ludacris)
- 04. "Work It"
- 05. "Back in the Day" (featuring Jay-Z)
- 06. "Funky Fresh Dressed" (featuring Ms. Jade)
- 09. "Slide"
- 10. "Play That Beat"
- 11. "Ain't That Funny"
- 12. "Hot"
- 14. "Work It (Remix)" [feat. 50 Cent] {Bonus Track}
- 15. "Drop the Bomb" {Bonus Track}

=== Ms. Jade - Girl Interrupted ===
- 01. "Intro"
- 02. "Jade's a Champ"
- 03. "She's a Gangsta" (produced with Scott Storch)
- 05. "Ching Ching" (featuring Timbaland and Nelly Furtado)
- 06. "Get Away" (featuring Nesh)
- 07. "Ching Ching, Pt. 2" (featuring Timbaland)
- 08. "Step Up"
- 09. "Interlude"
- 10. "Count it Off" (featuring Jay-Z)
- 11. "Really Don't Want My Love" (featuring Missy Elliott)
- 12. "Dead Wrong" (featuring Nate Dogg)
- 13. "Feel the Girl"
- 14. "Big Head" (featuring Mary Malena and Timbaland)
- 15. "Different"
- 16. "Why U Tell Me That" (featuring Lil' Mo)

=== Pastor Troy - Universal Soldier ===
- 03. "Are We Cuttin'" (featuring Ms. Jade)
- 06. "Tell 'Em It's On" (featuring Timbaland)

=== The Relativez - The Takeover ===
- 06. "Maria" (feat. Timbaland) (unreleased)

=== Rell - The Remedy (shelved) ===
- 10. "It's Obvious" (feat. Jay-Z)

=== Shade Sheist - Informal Introduction ===
- 08. "Money Owners" (featuring Timbaland)

=== Slum Village - Disco (CDS) ===
- 01. "Disco (Remix)" [feat. Raje Shwari & Ms. Jade]

=== Solange - Solo Star ===
- 04. "Get Together"

=== Justin Timberlake - Justified ===
(All tracks produced with Scott Storch)

- 3. "(Oh No) What You Got"
- 5. "Cry Me a River"
- 10. "(And She Said) Take Me Now"
- 11. "Right for Me" (featuring Bubba Sparxxx)

=== TLC - 3D ===
- 09. "Dirty Dirty" (produced with Missy Elliott)

=== Truth Hurts - Truthfully Speaking ===
- 12. "Real"

=== Tweet - Southern Hummingbird ===
- 07. "Oops (Oh My)" [featuring Missy "Misdemeanor" Elliott]
- 08. "Make Ur Move"
- 12. "Heaven"
- 13. "Call Me"
- 16. "Sexual Healing (Oops Pt. 2)" [featuring Ms. Jade]

== 2003 ==
=== Sincere - What (CDS) ===
- 01. " What" (unreleased)

=== Nate Dogg - Nate Dogg (shelved) ===
- 8. "Gott Damn Shame" (featuring Timbaland and Ms. Jade)

=== Lil' Kim - La Bella Mafia ===
- 8. "The Jump Off" (featuring Mr. Cheeks)

=== Mýa - Moodring ===
- 4. "Step" (produced with Mýa, Missy Elliott, and Ron Fair)

=== Zane - The Big Zane Theory ===
- 4. "Bounce"

=== Bubba Sparxxx - Deliverance ===
- 2. "Jimmy Mathis"
- 3. "Comin' Round"
- 4. "She Tried" (featuring Ryan Tedder)
- 5. "Nowhere" (featuring Kiley Dean)
- 6. "Overcome"
- 7. "Warrant Interlude"
- 8. "Warrant" (featuring Attitude & Timbaland)
- 10. "Deliverance" (featuring Timbaland)
- 11. "Hootnanny" (featuring Justin Timberlake)
- 12. "Take a Load Off"
- 14. "My Tone"

=== Obie Trice - Cheers ===
- 7. "Bad Bitch" (featuring Timbaland)

=== Jay-Z - The Black Album ===
- 6. "Dirt off Your Shoulder"

=== Timbaland & Magoo - Under Construction Part II ===
- 1. "Straight Outta Virginia" (Intro)
- 2. "Cop That Shit" (featuring Missy Elliott)
- 3. "Shenanigans" (featuring Bubba Sparxxx)
- 4. "Leavin'" (featuring Attitude)
- 5. "That Shit Ain't Gonna Work"
- 7. "Indian Flute" (featuring Sebastian and Rajé Shwari)
- 8. "Can We Do It Again"
- 9. "Naughty Eye" (featuring Sebastian and Raje Shwari)
- 10. "N 2 da Music" (featuring Brandy)
- 11. "Hold On" (featuring Wyclef Jean)
- 12. "Insane" (featuring Candice "Gg" Nelson)
- 13. "Throwback"
- 14. "Kold Kutz"
- 16. "Naughty Eye II (Hips)" [featuring Beenie Man]

=== Missy Elliott - This Is Not a Test! ===
(All tracks produced with Missy Elliott)

- 1. "Baby Girl Interlude/Intro" (featuring Mary J. Blige)
- 2. "Bomb Intro/Pass That Dutch"
- 3. "Wake Up" (featuring Jay-Z)
- 4. "Keep It Movin'" (featuring Elephant Man)
- 6. "Ragtime Interlude/I'm Really Hot"
- 8. "Don't Be Cruel" (featuring Monica and Beenie Man)
- 9. "Toyz Interlude/Toyz"
- 10. "Let It Bump" (featuring Timbaland)
- 11. "Pump It Up" (featuring Nelly)
- 13. "Let Me Fix My Weave"
- 14. "Spelling Bee Interlude/Spelling Bee"
- 16. "Outro" (featuring Mary J. Blige)
- 00. "Pass That Dutch (Remix)" (featuring Busta Rhymes)

=== Alicia Keys - The Diary of Alicia Keys ===
- 3. "Heartburn" (produced with Alicia Keys)

== 2004 ==
=== Cee-Lo Green - Cee-Lo Green... Is the Soul Machine ===
- 5. "I'll Be Around" (featuring Timbaland)

=== Knoc-Turn'al - The Way I Am ===
- 14. "Have Fun"

=== Petey Pablo - Still Writing in My Diary: 2nd Entry ===
- 8. "Get on Dis Motorcycle" (featuring Bubba Sparxxx) (produced with Scott Storch)
- 9. "Break Me Off" (featuring Missy Elliott)

=== Brandy - Afrodisiac ===
(All tracks produced with Brandy)

- 2. "Afrodisiac"
- 3. "Who Is She 2 U"
- 5. "I Tried"
- 7. "Focus"
- 8. "Sadiddy"
- 9. "Turn It Up"
- 12. "Come As You Are"
- 13. "Finally"
- 15. "Should I Go"
- 16. "Nodding Off"

=== Lloyd Banks - The Hunger For More ===
- 6. "I'm So Fly" (produced with Danja)

=== Beenie Man - Back to Basics ===
- 11. "All Girls Party"

=== LL Cool J - The DEFinition ===
- 1. "Headsprung"
- 2. "Rub My Back"
- 6. "Every Sip" (featuring Candice Nelson)
- 8. "Can't Explain It"
- 9. "Feel the Beat"
- 10. "Apple Cobbler"

=== Utada Hikaru - Exodus ===
- 3. "Exodus '04"
- 12. "Wonder 'Bout"
- 13. "Let Me Give You My Love"

=== Various artists - Shark Tale (soundtrack) ===
- 3. "Good Foot" - Justin Timberlake with Timbaland

=== Shawnna - Worth tha Weight ===
- 5. "Shake Dat Shit" (featuring Ludacris)

=== Jacki-O - Poe Little Rich Girl ===
- 7. "Slow Down"

=== Ludacris - The Red Light District ===
- 1. "Intro"
- 7. "The Potion"

=== Xzibit - Weapons of Mass Destruction ===
- 9. "Hey Now (Mean Muggin)" [featuring Keri Hilson]

== 2005 ==
=== The Game - The Documentary ===
- 9. "Put You on the Game" (produced with Danja)

=== Jennifer Lopez - Rebirth ===
- 10. "He'll Be Back" (produced with Danja and Cory Rooney)

=== Tweet - It's Me Again ===
- 13. "Steer" (produced with Missy Elliott, Nisan Stewart, and Charlie Bereal)

=== Various artists - xXx: State of the Union (soundtrack) ===
- 9. "Here We Go" - Dirtbag

=== The Black Eyed Peas - Monkey Business ===
- 3. "My Style" (featuring Justin Timberlake and Timbaland) (produced with Danja)

=== Fat Joe - All or Nothing ===
- 11. "Everybody Get Up"

=== Missy Elliott - The Cookbook ===
(Tracks produced with Missy Elliott)

- 1. "Joy" (featuring Mike Jones)
- 2. "Partytime"

=== The Pussycat Dolls - PCD ===
- 3. "Wait a Minute" (featuring Timbaland) (produced with Keri Hilson and Ron Fair)

=== Ray J - Raydiation ===
- 11. "Unbelievable" (featuring Gangsta Girl, Detail and Shorty Mack)

=== Jamie Foxx - Unpredictable ===
- 5. "Can I Take U Home" (produced with Static Major)

== 2006 ==
=== Bubba Sparxxx - The Charm ===
- 11. "Hey! (A Lil' Gratitude)"

=== Nelly Furtado - Loose ===
(All tracks produced with Danja and Jim Beanz)

- 1. "Afraid" (featuring Attitude)
- 2. "Maneater"
- 3. "Promiscuous" (featuring Timbaland)
- 4. "Glow"
- 6. "No Hay Igual" (produced with Nisan Stewart)
- 8. "Say It Right"
- 9. "Do It"
- 11. "Wait for You"
- 12. "All Good Things (Come to an End)"

=== Busta Rhymes - The Big Bang ===
- 13. "Get Down" (produced with Nisan Stewart)

=== Danity Kane - Danity Kane ===
(Tracks produced with Danja)

- 3. "Want It"
- 4. "Right Now"

=== Justin Timberlake - FutureSex/LoveSounds ===
(All tracks produced with Justin Timberlake and Danja)

- 1. "FutureSex/LoveSound"
- 2. "SexyBack"
- 3. "Sexy Ladies / Let Me Talk to You (Prelude)"
- 4. "My Love" (featuring T.I.)
- 5. "LoveStoned / I Think She Knows (Interlude)"
- 6. "What Goes Around... / ...Comes Around (Interlude)"
- 7. "Chop Me Up" (featuring Timbaland and Three 6 Mafia)
- 9. "Summer Love / Set the Mood (Prelude)"
- 10. "Until the End of Time"
- 11. "Losing My Way"

=== Chingy - Hoodstar ===
- 12. "Let Me Luv U" (featuring Keri Hilson)

=== Diddy - Press Play ===
- 14. "After Love" (featuring Keri Hilson) (produced with Danja)

=== Snoop Dogg - Tha Blue Carpet Treatment ===
- 7. "Get a Light" (featuring Damian Marley) (produced with Danja)

=== Young Jeezy - The Inspiration ===
- 7. "3 A.M." (featuring Timbaland)

=== Omarion - 21 ===
(Tracks produced with The Royal Court)

- 2. "Ice Box" (featuring Timbaland)
- 9. "Beg for It"

== 2007 ==
=== Timbaland - Shock Value ===
- 1. "Oh Timbaland"
- 2. "Give It to Me" (featuring Nelly Furtado and Justin Timberlake) (produced with Danja)
- 3. "Release" (featuring Justin Timberlake)
- 4. "The Way I Are" (featuring Keri Hilson and D.O.E.) (produced with Danja)
- 5. "Bounce" (featuring Dr. Dre, Missy Elliott and Justin Timberlake)
- 6. "Come and Get Me" (featuring 50 Cent and Tony Yayo) (produced with Danja)
- 7. "Kill Yourself" (featuring Sebastian and Attitude)
- 8. "Boardmeeting" (featuring Magoo) (produced with Danja)
- 10. "Scream" (featuring Keri Hilson and Nicole Scherzinger) (produced with Danja)
- 12. "Bombay" (featuring Amar and Jim Beanz)
- 13. "Throw It on Me" (featuring The Hives)
- 14. "Time" (featuring She Wants Revenge)
- 15. "One and Only" (featuring Fall Out Boy) (produced with Hannon Lane)
- 16. "Apologize" (featuring OneRepublic) (produced with Greg Wells and Ryan Tedder)
- 17. "2 Man Show" (featuring Elton John)
- 18. "Hello" (featuring Keri Hilson and Attitude)
- 19. "Come Around" (featuring M.I.A.) (produced with Jim Beanz)
- 00. "Give It to Me (Laugh At Em) [Remix]" (featuring Jay-Z & Justin Timberlake) (produced with Danja)

=== Redman - Red Gone Wild: Thee Album ===
- 3. "Put It Down"

=== Björk - Volta ===
(Tracks produced with Bjork and Danja)

- 1. "Earth Intruders"
- 4. "Innocence"

=== Bobby Valentino - Special Occasion ===
(Tracks produced with J-Roc and King Logan)

- 2. "Anonymous" (featuring Timbaland)
- 5. "Rearview (Ridin')" (featuring Ludacris)

=== Tank - Sex, Love & Pain ===
- 12. "I Love Them Girls" (Timbaland Remix)

=== Rihanna - Good Girl Gone Bad ===
- 8. "Sell Me Candy" (produced with Makeba Riddick and The-Dream)
- 9. "Lemme Get That" (produced with The-Dream)
- 10. "Rehab" (produced with Hannon Lane and Justin Timberlake)t

=== Fabolous - From Nothin' to Somethin' ===
- 4. "Make Me Better" (featuring Ne-Yo)

=== M.I.A. - Kala ===
- 12. "Come Around" (featuring Timbaland) (produced with Jim Beanz and M.I.A.)

=== 50 Cent - Curtis ===
- 7. "Ayo Technology" (featuring Justin Timberlake and Timbaland) (produced with Danja)

=== Cheri Dennis - In & Out of Love ===
- 11. "Act Like You Know"

=== Duran Duran - Red Carpet Massacre ===
- 3. "Nite-Runner" (produced with Duran Duran, Justin Timberlake and Danja)
- 6. "Skin Divers" (produced with Duran Duran and Danja)
- 9. "Zoom In" (produced with Duran Duran and Danja)

=== Mario - Go ===
- 7. "No Definition" (produced with J-Roc and King Logan)

== 2008 ==
=== Various artists - Step Up 2: The Streets (soundtrack) ===
- 2. "Shake Your Pom Pom" - Missy Elliott

=== Flo Rida - Mail on Sunday ===
- 3. "Elevator" (featuring Timbaland) (produced with Hannon Lane)

=== M. Pokora - MP3 ===
- 1. "Dangerous" (featuring Timbaland & Sebastian)
- 2. "Catch Me if you Can"
- 4. "No Me without U"
- 12. "Why Do you Cry?" (produced with Jim Beanz)
- 13. "Like a Criminal"

=== Madonna - Hard Candy ===
(All tracks produced with Justin Timberlake)

- 2. "4 Minutes" (featuring Justin Timberlake and Timbaland) (produced with Danja)
- 5. "Miles Away" (produced with Danja)
- 9. "Dance 2Night" (produced with Hannon Lane and Demacio "Demo" Castellon)
- 11. "Devil Wouldn't Recognize You" (produced with Danja)
- 12. "Voices" (produced with Danja and Hannon Lane)

=== Ashlee Simpson - Bittersweet World ===
(All tracks produced with King Logan, J-Roc, and Jim Beanz)

- 1. "Outta My Head (Ay Ya Ya)"
- 3. "Rule Breaker"
- 6. "Ragdoll" (produced with Kenna)
- 7. "Bittersweet World"
- 8. "What I've Become" (produced with Demacio "Demo" Castellon)
- 10. "Murder"

=== New Kids on the Block - The Block ===
- 9. "Twisted" (featuring Timbaland) (produced with J-Roc)

=== The Pussycat Dolls - Doll Domination ===
(All tracks produced with J-Roc)

- 9. "Magic"
- 10. "Halo"
- 11. "In Person"
- 15. "Whatchamacallit"

=== Jennifer Hudson - Jennifer Hudson ===
- 3. "Pocketbook" (featuring Ludacris) (produced with Jim Beanz)

=== Jamie Foxx - Intuition ===
- 2. "I Don't Need It" (featuring Timbaland) (produced with J-Roc)

== 2009 ==
=== Chris Cornell - Scream ===
- All tracks produced with J-Roc
  - 10. "Enemy" (produced with The Royal Court)

=== Keri Hilson - In a Perfect World... ===
- 4. "Return the Favor" (featuring Timbaland) (produced with Walter Milsap)
- 8. "Intuition" (produced with Danja and Keri Hilson)
- 9. "How Does It Feel" (produced with Danja, Keri Hilson and Jim Beanz)
- 14. "Where Did He Go" (produced with Danja and Keri Hilson)

=== Ginuwine - A Man's Thoughts ===
- 8. "Get Involved" (featuring Missy Elliott and Timbaland) (produced with J-Roc)

=== Jay-Z - The Blueprint 3 ===
- 8. "Off That" (featuring Drake)
- 10. "Venus vs. Mars"
- 13. "Reminder"

=== Shakira - She Wolf ===
- 13. "Give It Up to Me" (featuring Lil Wayne) (produced with J-Roc)

=== Wyclef Jean - From the Hut, To the Projects, To the Mansion ===
- 7. "More Bottles" (featuring Timbaland)

=== Birdman - Priceless ===
- 5. "Pricele$$" (featuring Lil Wayne)

=== Timbaland - Shock Value II ===
  - 2. "Carry Out" (featuring Justin Timberlake) (produced with J-Roc)
  - 3. "Lose Control" (featuring JoJo) (produced with J-Roc)
  - 4. "Meet in tha Middle" (featuring Bran' Nu) (produced with Polow da Don)
  - 5. "Say Something" (featuring Drake) (produced with J-Roc)
  - 6. "Tomorrow in the Bottle" (featuring Chad Kroeger and Sebastian) (produced with J-Roc and Wizz Dumb)
  - 7. "We Belong to the Music" (featuring Miley Cyrus) (produced with J-Roc)
  - 8. "Morning After Dark" (featuring Nelly Furtado and SoShy) (produced with J-Roc)
  - 9. "If We Ever Meet Again" (featuring Katy Perry) (produced with Jim Beanz)
  - 10. "Can You Feel It" (featuring Esthero and Sebastian) (produced with J-Roc)
  - 11. "Ease Off the Liquor" (featuring Melody Thornton) (produced with J-Roc)
  - 12. "Undertow" (featuring The Fray and Esthero) (produced with The Fray)
  - 13. "Timothy Where You Been" (featuring Jet) (produced with J-Roc)
  - 14. "Long Way Down" (featuring Daughtry) (produced with J-Roc)
  - 15. "Marchin On (Timbo Version)" (featuring OneRepublic) (produced with Ryan Tedder)
  - 16. "The One I Love" (featuring Keri Hilson and D.O.E.) (produced with J-Roc)
  - 17. "Symphony" (featuring Attitude, Bran' Nu and D.O.E.) (produced with J-Roc)

== 2010 ==
=== Drake - Thank Me Later ===
- 14. "Thank Me Now"

=== Keri Hilson - No Boys Allowed ===
(Tracks produced with J-Roc)

- 8. "Breaking Point"
- 9. "Beautiful Mistake"
- 14. "Lie to Me" (featuring Timbaland) (produced with J-Mizzle)
- 15. "Won't Be Long" (featuring Timbaland) (produced with J-Mizzle)
- 17. "Drippin'"

=== Keyshia Cole - Calling All Hearts ===
- 9. "Last Hangover" (featuring Timbaland)

=== Michelle Branch (w/ Timbaland) - "Getaway" ===
Source:

== 2011 ==
=== Game - Purp & Patron (The Hangover) ===
- 7. "Get Familiar" (featuring Timbaland)

=== Chris Brown - F.A.M.E. ===
- 16. "Paper, Scissors, Rock" (featuring Timbaland and Big Sean) (produced with J-Roc)
- 18. "Talk Ya Ear Off"

=== Timbaland (w/ Pitbull) - "Pass at Me" ===
(produced with David Guetta & Giorgio Tuinifort)

=== Lil Wayne - Tha Carter IV ===
- 19. "Up Up and Away" (produced with Wizz Dumb)

=== Demi Lovato - Unbroken ===
(All tracks produced with Jim Beanz)

- 1. "All Night Long" (featuring Missy Elliott and Timbaland) (produced with J-Roc)
- 4. "Together" (featuring Jason Derulo)
- 5. "Lightweight"

=== Various artists - Reel Steel (soundtrack) ===
- 8. "Give It a Go" - Veronica & Timbaland

=== Short Dawg - The Adventures of Drankenstein ===
- 3. "Bone" (featuring Z-Ro)
- 14. "All Y'all" (featuring Timbaland and Attitude)

=== Lyrica Anderson - King Me ===
- 11. "Vampire" (featuring Timbaland)

== 2012 ==
=== Timbaland (feat. Ne-Yo) - "Hands in the Air" ===
(produced with Keithin Pitman)

=== Timati - SWAGG ===
- 2. "Not All About the Money" (with La La Land featuring Timbaland and Grooya)

== 2013 ==
=== Justin Timberlake - The 20/20 Experience ===
- All tracks (produced with Justin Timberlake and J-Roc)

=== Jay-Z - Magna Carta... Holy Grail ===
- 1. "Holy Grail" (featuring Justin Timberlake) (produced with The-Dream, J-Roc, and No I.D.)
- 2. "Picasso Baby" (produced with J-Roc)
- 3. "Tom Ford" (produced with J-Roc)
- 4. "Fuckwithmeyouknowigotit" (featuring Rick Ross) (produced with Boi-1da, Vinylz, and J-Roc)
- 5. "Oceans" (featuring Frank Ocean) (produced with Pharrell)
- 6. "F.U.T.W." (produced with J-Roc)
- 9. "Heaven" (produced with J-Roc)
- 10. "Versus" (produced with Swizz Beatz)
- 11. "Part II (On the Run)" (featuring Beyoncé) (produced with J-Roc)
- 14. "JAY Z Blue" (produced with J-Roc and Justin Timberlake)
- 15. "La Familia" (produced with J-Roc)
- 17. "Open Letter" (produced with Swizz Beatz and J-Roc) {Bonus Track}

=== Timbaland - "Know Bout Me" (feat. Jay-Z, James Fauntleroy & Drake) ===
(produced with Jerome Harmon)

=== Robin Thicke - Blurred Lines ===
- 2. "Take It Easy on Me" (produced with J-Roc)

=== Juicy J - Stay Trippy ===
- 10. "The Woods" (featuring Justin Timberlake and Timbaland)

=== Cher - Closer to the Truth ===
- 12. "I Don't Have to Sleep to Dream" (produced with J-Roc and Ivan Corraliza)

=== Justin Timberlake - The 20/20 Experience – 2 of 2 ===
- All tracks produced with Justin Timberlake and J-Roc
  - 3. "Cabaret" (featuring Drake) (produced with Daniel Jones)
  - 9. "Amnesia" (produced with Daniel Jones)

=== DJ Khaled - Suffering From Success ===
- 4. "You Don't Want These Problems" (featuring Big Sean, Rick Ross, French Montana, 2 Chainz, Meek Mill, Ace Hood and Timbaland) (produced with DJ Khaled, DJ Nasty & LVM, and Lee on the Beats)

=== Dido - Greatest Hits ===
- 4. "White Flag" (Timbaland Remix)

=== Brit Smith ===
- "Provocative (hiDhi)" (featuring will.i.am) (Produced with J-Roc)

=== Beyoncé - Beyoncé ===
(All tracks produced with Beyoncé and J-Roc)

- 3. "Drunk in Love" (featuring Jay-Z) (produced with Detail, The Order, and BOOTS)
- 4. "Blow" (produced with Pharrell)
- 6. "Partition" (produced with Justin Timberlake, Key Wane, BOOTS, and Mike Dean)
- 8. "Rocket"

== 2014 ==
=== Brasco - 18th Floor Thompson Hotel Edition ===
- 5. "Big Spenda" (featuring Pusha T and Timbaland)
- 12. "6 Figures"

=== Rick Ross - Mastermind ===
- 19. "You Know I Got It (Reprise)" (produced with Boi-1da, Vinylz, and J-Roc)

=== Jason Derulo - Talk Dirty ===
- 4. "Bubblegum" (featuring Tyga) (produced with Jim Beanz)

=== Michael Jackson - Xscape ===
(All tracks produced with J-Roc)

- 2. "Chicago" (produced with Cory Rooney)
- 3. "Loving You" (produced with Michael Jackson)
- 5. "Slave to the Rhythm" (produced with L.A. Reid and Babyface)
- 6. "Do You Know Where Your Children Are" (produced with Michael Jackson)
- 7. "Blue Gangsta" (produced with King Logan, Daniel Jones, and Dr. Freeze)

=== Emerson Windy - Herojuana ===
- 2. "Come Get It" (featuring Pusha T) (produced with Jazzfeezy)

=== Karl Wolf - Stereotype ===
- 3. "Magic Hotel" (featuring Timbaland and Brasco)

=== Jennifer Hudson - JHUD ===
- 4. "Walk It Out" (featuring Timbaland) (produced with J-Roc and Jim Beanz)

=== Rick Ross - Hood Billionaire ===
- 9. "Movin’ Bass" (featuring Jay Z) (produced with J-Roc)
- 10. "If They Knew" (featuring K. Michelle)

== 2015 ==
=== V. Bozeman (feat. Timbaland) - "Smile" ===
Source:

=== Jodeci - The Past, The Present, The Future ===
(Tracks produced with DeVante Swing)

- 4. "Those Things"
- 7. "Incredible"

=== Bryson Tiller - Trapsoul ===
- 11. "Sorry Not Sorry" (produced with Milli Beatz)
- 12. "Been That Way" (produced with Fade MaJah)

=== Monica - Code Red ===
- 3. "Love Just Ain't Enough" (featuring Timbaland) (produced with Jonathan Solone-Myvett and Nick Brongers)
- 4. "Call My Name" (produced with Polow da Don and Daniel Jones)
- 6. "All Men Lie" (featuring Timbaland) (produced with Nick Brongers)

=== Pusha T - King Push – Darkest Before Dawn: The Prelude ===
- 2. "Untouchable" (produced with Milli Beatz)
- 6. "Got Em Covered" (featuring Ab-Liva) (produced with Milli Beatz)
- 8. "Retribution" (featuring Kehlani) (produced with Deafh Beats)

=== Timbaland - King Stays King ===
- All tracks
  - 1. "Get No Betta" (featuring Mila J) (produced with Kaui)
  - 2. "Shakin" (featuring Aaliyah) (produced with Strato)
  - 3. "Dem Jeans" (featuring Migos) (produced with Milli Beatz)
  - 4. "Frenemies" (featuring Tink and Myari) (produced with Fade MaJah)
  - 5. "Tables Turn" (featuring Obsessed and Tink) (produced with Fade MaJah)
  - 6. "Servin" (featuring Blaze and Tweezie) (produced with Milli Beatz)
  - 7. "Smile On Yo Face" (featuring Yo Gotti) (produced with Milli Beatz)
  - 8. "Didn't Do It" (featuring Young Thug) (produced with Milli Beatz)
  - 9. "Callin And Callin" (featuring Young Crazy and Breeze Barker) (produced with Milli Beatz)
  - 10. "Where You At?" (featuring Blaze Serving) (produced with Milli Beatz)
  - 11. "Shawty" (featuring Rich Homie Quan) (produced with Milli Beatz)
  - 12. "This Me, Fuck It" (featuring 2 Chainz) (produced with Milli Beatz)
  - 14. "Drama Queen" (featuring Tink) (produced with Milli Beatz)
  - 15. "Go Ahead (Boo Boo Kitty)" (featuring Wedding Crashers, Goldy, and Cynthia) (produced with Milli Beatz)
  - 16. "Drug Dealer" (featuring Rico Richie) (produced with Milli Beatz)
  - 17. "You Held It Down" (featuring Bankroll and Obsessed) (produced with Milli Beatz)

== 2016 ==
=== Rihanna - ANTI ===
- 8. "Yeah, I Said It" (produced with Fade MaJah and Daniel Jones)

=== Yo Gotti - The Art of Hustle ===
- 6. "Smile" (featuring Timbaland) (produced with Milli Beatz)

=== Tweet - Charlene ===
- 6. "Somebody Else Will" (featuring Missy Elliott)

=== Snoop Dogg - Coolaid ===
- 17. "Got Those"

=== Timbaland - Skylander's Academy ===
- 01. "Harmony" (produced with Angel Lopez)

=== Various artists - Trolls (soundtrack) ===
- 11. "September" - Justin Timberlake, Anna Kendrick and Earth, Wind & Fire (produced with Justin Timberlake and Earth, Wind & Fire)

== 2017 ==
=== Brad Paisley - Love & War ===
- 10. "Grey Goose Chase" (featuring Timbaland)
- 13. "Solar Power Girl" (featuring Timbaland)

=== Sam Smith - The Thrill of It All ===
- 10. "Pray"

=== Bruno Martini (feat. Timbaland & Johnny Fresco) - "Road" ===
(produced with Angel Lopez & Bruno Martini)

=== Timbaland (feat. 6lack) - "Grab the Wheel" ===
Source:

== 2018 ==
=== Justin Timberlake - Man of the Woods ===
(All tracks produced with Justin Timberlake)

- 1. "Filthy" (produced with Danja)
- 9. "Say Something" (featuring Chris Stapleton) (produced with Danja and Rance Dopson)
- 16. "Young Man" (produced with J-Roc)

=== Ski Mask the Slump God - You Will Regret ===
- 1. "Catch Me Outside"

=== Maluma - F.A.M.E. ===
- 6. "Mi Declaración" (featuring Timbaland and Sid) (produced with Rance, Edge, and Angel Lopez)

=== Various artists - Uncle Drew (soundtrack) ===
- 14. "What's the Play" - Wiz Khalifa

=== Little Mix - LM5 ===
- 11. "More than Words" (featuring Kamille) (produced with Angel Lopez, Federico Vindver, Rance, and Joe Kearns)

=== Mariah Carey - Caution ===
- 8. "8th Grade" (produced with Mariah Carey, Poo Bear, Angel Lopez, Federico Vindver, and Rance)

=== Zayn - Icarus Falls ===
- 27. "Too Much" (featuring Timbaland) (produced with Angel Lopez and Federico Vindver)

== 2019 ==
=== Tee Grizzley - Scriptures ===
(All tracks produced with Angel Lopez and Federico Vindver)

- 1. "Scriptures / Intro" (produced with Shucati and Lazlow 808)
- 2. "Sweet Thangs" (produced with Shucati and Bastian Völkel)
- 3. "Heroes" (produced with Keanu Beats and Hunnid)
- 5. "Had To" (produced with Keanu Beats and Cosa Nostra Beats)
- 6. "Locksmith"
- 7. "Gods Warriors" (produced with Keanu Beats and Ambezza)
- 10. "More Than Friends" (produced with Shucati)
- 12. "Million Dollar Foreign" (produced with Keanu Beats and SCXTT)

=== Chance The Rapper - The Big Day ===
- 12. "Big Fish" (featuring Gucci Mane) (produced with Chance the Rapper, TrapMoneyBenny, Angel Lopez, and Federico Vindver)

=== A$AP Ferg - Floor Seats ===
- "Hummer Limo" (produced with Angel Lopez and Federico Vindver)

=== Missy Elliott - Iconology ===
- 3. "DripDemeanor" (produced with Missy Elliott)
- 4. "Why I Still Love You" (produced with Angel Lopez and Federico Vindver)

=== Kanye West - Jesus Is King ===
(All tracks produced with Kanye West, Angel Lopez, and Federico Vindver)

- 4. "Closed on Sunday" (produced with Brian "AllDay" Miller)
- 7. "Water" (featuring Ant Clemons) (produced with BoogzDaBeast)
- 9. "Hands On" (featuring Fred Hammond)
- 10. "Use This Gospel" (featuring Clipse and Kenny G) (produced with DrtWrk, BoogzDaBeast, and Pi'erre Bourne)
- 11. "Jesus Is Lord" (produced with Brian "AllDay" Miller)

=== Dave East - Survival ===
- 6. "Seventeen" (produced with Shucati and Mike Kuz)

=== Jane Zhang - Past Progressive ===
- 10. "Dust My Shoulders Off" (featuring Timbaland) (produced with Jim Beanz)
- 11. "Adam and Eve" (produced with Jim Beanz)

== 2020 ==
=== Ant Clemons - Happy 2 Be Here ===
- 2. "4 Letter Word" (featuring Timbaland) (produced with Angel Lopez, Federico & The Roommates)

=== Bruno Martini - Originals ===
- 01. "Bend the Knee" (feat. Timbaland & IZA) (produced with Angel Lopez & Bruno)
- 05. "Riot" (feat. Mayra & Timbaland) (produced with Angel Lopez & Bruno)
- 06. "Bend the Knee" (feat. IZA & Timbaland) (produced with Angel Lopez & Bruno)
- 16. "Skin" (feat. Mayra, Timbaland & Johnny Franco) (produced with Angel Lopez & Bruno)

=== Carson Leuders - "No Caption" ===
(produced with Abaz, X-Plosive & Federico Vindver)

=== Megan Thee Stallion - Suga ===
- 9. "What I Need" (produced with J Tabb)

=== Joyner Lucas - ADHD ===
- 12. "10 Bands" (featuring Timbaland)

=== RMR - Drug Dealing Is a Lost Art ===
- 4. "I'm Not Over You" (produced with Andre Brissett)

=== Teyana Taylor - The Album ===
- 8. "Boomin" (featuring Missy Elliott and Future) (produced with Teyana Taylor, DJ Camper, Angel Lopez, Federico Vindver, Jordan Mosley, and Justin Mosley)

=== 6lack - 6pc Hot EP ===
- 5. "Elephant in the Room" (produced with Battlecat, Rance, and Brody Brown)

=== Burna Boy - Twice as Tall ===
- 1. "Level Up" (featuring Youssou N'Dour) (produced with Matt Testa, DJDS, and Matthew Baus)
- 2. "Alarm Clock" (produced with Diddy and P2J)
- 3. "Way Too Big" (produced with Diddy, Mike Dean, and LeriQ)
- 13. "Wetin Dey Sup" (produced with Telz)

== 2021 ==
=== J. Cole - The Off-Season ===
- 2. "Amari" (produced with Sucuki, J. Cole, and T-Minus)

=== Rick Ross - Richer Than I Ever Been ===
- 02. "The Pulitzer"

=== Kanye West – Donda (Deluxe) ===
- 26. "Up from the Ashes" (produced with

=== G-Eazy - These Things Happen Too ===
- 27. "Scars" (feat. Ant Clemmons) (produced with happy Perez)

=== Justine Skye - Space and Time ===
- Entire Album

=== Lauren Jauregui - PRELUDE ===
- 4. "Falling" (produced with Angel Lopez, Federico Vindver, and Justus West)

== 2022 ==
=== Jack Harlow - Come Home the Kids Miss You ===
- 9. "I Got a Shot" (produced with Jack Harlow, Boi-1da, JetsonMade, Chahayed, Frankie Bash, BabeTruth, Charlie Handsome, Jasper Harris, Nemo Achida, Foreign Teck, Wincorn, and Clay Harlow)
- 12. "Parent Trap" (produced with Jack Harlow, Chahayed, BabeTruth, Wallis Lane, 2forWoyne, and Mikewavvs)

=== Paulo Londra - Back to the Game ===
- 1. "Chango" (produced with Federico Vindver)
- 16. "Toc Toc" (produced with Federico Vindver)

=== The Game - Drillmatic – Heart vs. Mind ===
- 17. "Fortunate" (featuring Kanye West, Dreezy and Chiller) (produced with Tobias Wincorn)
- 26. ".38 Special" (featuring Blueface) (produced with Derek Kastal and MTK)

== 2023 ==
=== Beyoncé - "Grown Woman" ===
(produced with J-Roc)

=== Blockbusta - Busta Rhymes ===
- 01. "The Statement" (produced with BabeTruth)
- 13. "Hold Up" (produced with Dez Wright and Sami)

=== Really Her - Bia ===
- 01. "Big Business" (produced with SkipOnDaBeat, CRVS Serranio)
- 09. "I'm That Bitch" (feat. Timbaland) (produced with SkipOnDaBeat & Lil Rich)

=== Colt Graves (feat.Timbaland) - "Cowboy Capone" ===
(produced with Colt Graves, Jordan Centers & Jake Parshall)

=== The Color Purple (Music From and Inspired by the Motion Picture) - Various Artists ===
- 20. "No Love Lost" - Keyshia Cole (produced with Justin Timberlake, Ron Fair, Larrance Dopson, Federico Vindver)
- 29. "Workin (Timbaland Remix)" - Corey Hawkins with Black Thought
- 32. "Hell No! (Timbaland Remix)" - Danielle Brooks with Megan Thee Stallion

=== Madison Beer (feat. Timbaland) - "Home to Another One (Remix)" ===
Source:

=== Timbaland, Nelly Furtado & Justin Timberlake - "Keep Going Up" ===
(Produced with Last Trip To The Moon, Skiponthebeat & CVRS)

=== Timbaland & Vita - "Desire" ===
(produced with Monte Booker, NAZ)

=== Timbalad & Anna Margo - "My Way" ===
(produced with Anne Margo)

=== The Love Album: Off the Grid - Diddy ===
- 08. "Stay Long" (feat. Summer Walker) (produced with Remyondatrack, Williams & Slimwav)
- 23. "Kim Porter" (feat. John Legend & Babyface) (produced with Camper & Bailey)

== 2024 ==
=== Vultures 1 - ¥$ (Kanye West and Ty Dolla Sign) ===
- 02. "Keys to My Life" (featuring India Love) (produced with Ye, Ty Dolla Sign, Hubi, SHDØW, Veyis, VinnyForGood and The Legendary Traxster)
- 10. "Fuk Sumn" (featuring Playboi Carti and Travis Scott) (produced with Ye, Ty Dolla Sign, BBYKOBE, JPEGMafia and The Legendary Traxster)

=== Vultures 2 - ¥$ ===
- 17. "Sky City" (produced with Ye. Ty Dolla Sign, BoogzDaBeast, Angel Lopez, Federico Vindver & DrtWrk)

=== Everything I Thought It Was - Justin Timberlake ===
- 05. "Technicolor" (produced with Justin Timberlake, Angel López and Federico Vindver)
- 08. "Infinity Sex" (produced with Justin Timberlake, Federico Vindver and Calvin Harris)
- 09. "Love & War" (produced with Justin Timberlake, Angel López and Federico Vindver)
- 14. "What Lovers Do" (produced with Justin Timberlake, Angel López and Federico Vindver)
- 17. "Paradise" (featuring *NSYNC) (produced with Justin Timberlake, Angel López and Federico Vindver)

=== Glorious - GloRilla ===
- 07. "Stop Playing" (produced with SkipOnDaBeat, CRVS Serranio, Sakii & Satori)

=== Karma's a Bitch - Brit Smith ===
- "Karma's a Bitch" (produced with Rock Mafia)

=== Cosa Nuestra - Rauw Alejandro ===
- 18. "Sex Machine" (produced with El Zorro, Kenobi, Lokey, Smart & Dímelo Ninow^{[c])}

== 2025 ==
=== Tata Taktumi ===
- Pulse x Glitch
- Pulse (Single version)

=== Tata Taktumi & Fivio Foreign ===
- Rack It Up

=== Seventeen – Happy Burstday ===
- "Damage (HOSHI Solo) (feat. Timbaland)" (Hoshi solo)

== 2026 ==
=== Tata Taktumi ===
- Not So Bad

=== Timbaland ===
- Can You Be Mine (with Justin Blau)

=== Juvenile ===
- Yea Yea Yea Yeah (feat. Timbaland)
