= Swing Mob =

US musical group

- Also known as: Da Bassment Cru; Superfriends
- Origin: Virginia, U.S.
- Genres: R&B, hip hop
- Years active: 1991—1995 (Swing Mob); 1997—2004 (Superfriends)
- Labels: Elektra (Domestic); Polydor (Non-domestic)
- Members: DeVante Swing
- Past members: K-Ci & JoJo; Mr. Dalvin; Missy Elliott; Timbaland; Magoo; Ginuwine; Playa; Tweet; Jimmy Douglass; Stevie J Larry Live; Leshawn Shellman; Radiah Covington; Chonita Coleman; Sugah; Accion; Reeboc; Mr Brendal; Baazar Royale

Swing Mob (sometimes known as Da Bassment Cru) was a loosely knit musical collective consisting of artists and record labels first discovered by Jodeci member DeVante Swing in 1991. The artists on Swing Mob included Missy Elliott with the group Sista, Timbaland, Magoo, Ginuwine, Static Major and the rest of Playa, Darryl Pearson, Mike "Funky Mike" Jackson, Tweet with the group Sugah, Majik, Jimmy Douglass, Stevie J, Maija Max, Renee Anderson, Bazaar Royale and Chad "Dr. Ceuss" Elliott among others, although the group's full membership has never been documented comprehensively. A list of some known artists in Swing Mob at the time of the group's activity can be found in the liner notes of Jodeci's third studio album, The Show, The After-Party, The Hotel (1995).

== Swing Mob and formation of Da Bassment Cru ==
In the early 1990s, DeVante Swing decided to assemble a large crew of rappers, singers, instrumentalists and producer to sign to his Swing Mob label and collaborate with. He auditioned many local groups and acts. The performers met in Swing's basement studio in Rochester, a location that inspired the moniker "Da Bassment Cru" (also a pun on bass). The group brainstormed and recorded music together in Swing's studio, ultimately aiming to produce a VHS compilation project that could market the group members to record labels. Acts who were recruited into Da Bassment Cru included Jodeci, the R&B groups Fayze (later renamed to Sista) which was a group Missy Elliott was in, Playa, the rap duo Timbaland & Magoo, R&B group Sugah which members included famous singer Tweet, rock artist Baazar Royale, solo underground rappers Mr.Brendal & Accion, solo female rapper Reeboc and singer Ginuwine. Swing Mob also recruited record producers and audio engineers such as Jimmy Douglass and Stevie J. During this time, Swing also met Rochester School Of The Arts graduate Renee Anderson through Paul Boutte, a prominent figure in the Rochester gospel scene, producer Reginald Moore and Dave Schumaker. Anderson was a member of Colorz, a local R&B girl group at the time. Moore played Anderson's demo for Swing backstage during an appearance on The Tonight Show with Jay Leno, and Swing then flew back to Rochester to meet Anderson, agreeing to produce an album for her.

From 1993 to 1995, the collective crew released multiple collaborative EPs, though many of these were commercially unsuccessful. In 1994, Sista released its sole album, 4 All the Sistas Around da World; this album received positive reviews but was shelved due to a lack of commercial success. Swing Mob members also featured on film soundtracks during this period, with their music appearing in titles such as Above the Rim and Dangerous Minds.

The Swing Mob label dissolved in 1995. Artists such as Missy Elliott (who had been a member of Sista) Timbaland & Magoo, and Ginuwine had begun to leave the group and pursue musical careers elsewhere, and other artists from the collective stated that they felt Swing was underpromoting or mismanaging them. Smoke E. Digglera of Playa has stated that artists were forced to choose whether they wanted to sign directly to Def Jam or through Swing Mob instead, weakening some acts' loyalty to the Swing Mob brand. Since the disbandment of the collective, Swing has also been accused of physically abusive behavior toward his artists. Stevie J has described an incident in which Swing purportedly entered the studio with his entourage and began slapping the artists, a situation which devolved into an all-out brawl.

== Superfriends ==
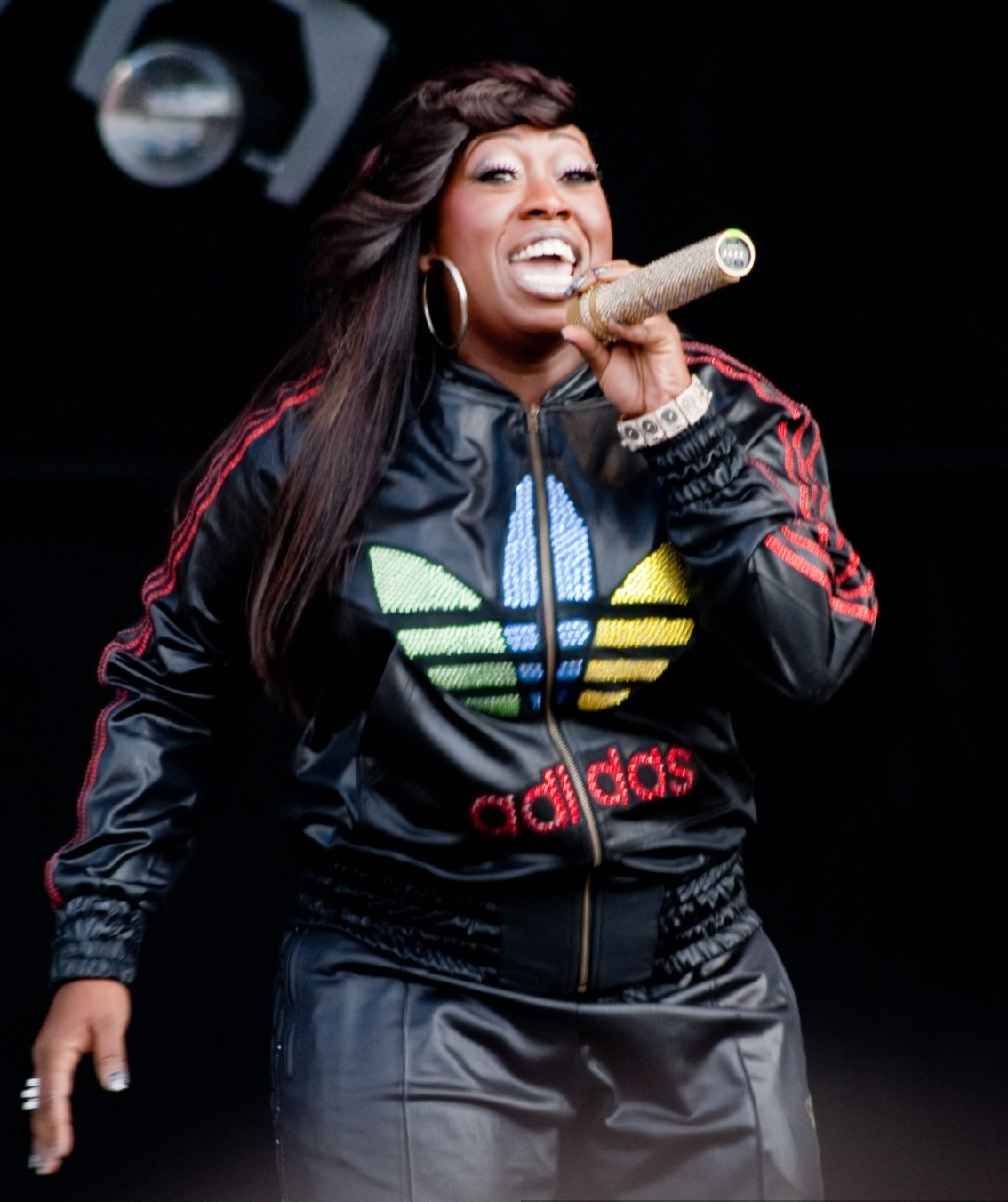
Missy Elliott was first part of the girl group SISTA under the Swing Mob collective before branching off to become a successful artist.

After the dissolution of Swing Mob, its former artists collaborated, with Playa, Elliott, Timbaland, Magoo and Ginuwine forming the collective Superfriends in 1996. The founding members would add a few more members to the new roster which included Nicole Wray, N.E.R.D., the Clipse, Shaunta Montgomery, Sebastian, Danja Mowf, DJ Lonnie B, Tweet, and rising R&B artist Aaliyah. The collective began working with each other and collaborating on each other's recordings, keeping the features within the group, and often appearing in each other music videos.

The first collaboration under the Suparfriendz name took place on Timbaland & Magoo's 1997 single "Up Jumps da Boogie", in which Elliott and Ginuwine provided background vocals and made appearances in the music video. Also providing background vocals was Aaliyah, who had become affiliated with the former Swing Mob roster after Timbaland produced her 1996 album One in a Million. Missy Elliott, who had served as a writer and background vocalist on One in a Million, went on to release her debut solo album, Supa Dupa Fly, in 1997. A critical and commercial success that featured production from both Elliott and Timbaland, this album helped to raise the profile of the collective. While affiliated with the Supafriendz collective, Playa released the 1998 album Cheers 2 U. Playa member Static Major also served as a songwriter for many other members of the collective, contributing writing to Ginuwine's "Pony" and many of Aaliyah's songs from this period. Nicole Wray and Tweet also released music during the Supafriendz' period of peak activity.

Aaliyah, who had become a core member of the Superfriends due to her commercial success, died in 2001. This loss shook the collective, and its members gradually began to drift apart in the aftermath.

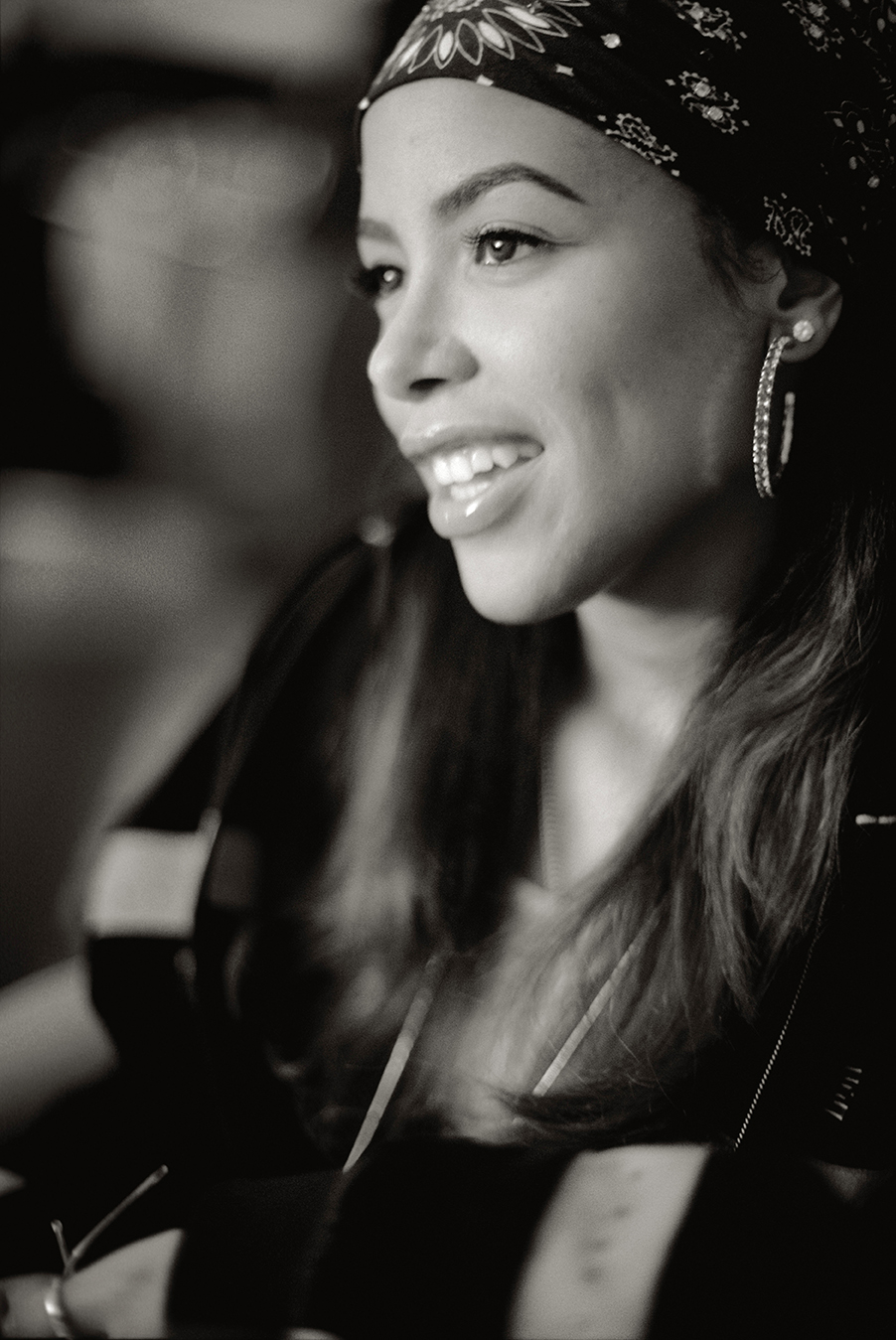
R&B artist Aaliyah became a major part of the Supafriendz collective after the release of her album One in a Milion.

=== Supafriendz members ===
- Missy Elliott (artist, writer, producer, background vocals)
- Aaliyah (singer, background vocals)
- Timbaland (producer, rapper, writer)
- Magoo (rapper, writer)
- Mad Skillz (rapper, ghostwriter)
- Static Major (singer, rapper, writer, background vocals)
- Ginuwine (singer, writer)
- Smoke E. Digglera (singer, producer, writer, background vocals, instrumentalists)
- Danja Mowf (rapper, writer)
- DJ Lonnie B (rapper, writer, producer)
- Shaunta Montgomery (rapper, writer)
- Digital Black (rapper, singer, writer, background vocals)
- Tweet (singer, writer)
- Nicole Wray (singer, writer)

=== Superfriends collective singles ===
| Song | Artist(s) | Featured artist |
|---|---|---|
| "4 Page Letter" | Aaliyah | Timbaland (as background vocals) |
| "We At It Again | Timbaland & Magoo | Static Major, Sebastian |
| "Luv to Luv Ya" | Timbaland & Magoo | Playa, Shaunta Montgomery |
| "G Thang" | Ginuwine | Missy Elliott, Magoo |
| " Body Snatchers" | The Clipse | N.E.R.D. |
| "Grindin" | The Clipse | N.E.R.D. |
| "One Man Woman" | Playa | Aaliyah |
| Got Caught Dealing Pt.1&2 | The Clipse | N.E.R.D. |
| Big White Spaceship | N.E.R.D | Timbaland & Magoo |
| "JOY" | Timbaland & Magoo | Ginuwine Playa |
| "Make It Hot" | Nicole Wray | Missy Elliott |
| "All In My Grill | Missy Elliott | Nicole Wray |
| "Smoke in the Air" | Timbaland & Magoo | Playa |
| "Intro" | Playa | Magoo |
| Derby City | Playa | Magoo |
| "Ms.Parker" | Playa | Missy Elliott |
| "Ain't Nothin But A B Party " | Swing Mob | Timbaland & Magoo Playa Devante Swing |
| "All Y'all" | Timbaland & Magoo | Tweet, Sebastian Mosley |
| "Are You That Somebody" | Aaliyah | Timbaland Static Major Mad Skillz DJ Lonnie B Danj Mowf |
| "Bounce" | Timbaland | Missy Elliott |
| "Beep Me 911" | Missy Elliott | Timbaland & Magoo, 702 |
| "Call Me" | Tweet | Missy Elliott (as background vocals) |
| "Cheers 2 U" | Playa | Timbaland (as background vocals) |
| "Cop That Shit" | Timbaland & Magoo | Missy Elliott |
| "Hot Like Fire" | Aaliyah | Missy Elliott (as background vocals) |
| "I Care 4 U" | Aaliyah | |
| "If Your Girl Only Knew" | Aaliyah | Missy Elliott (as background vocals) |
| "Make It Hot" | Nicole Wray | Missy Elliott, Timbaland |
| "None of Ur Friends Business" | Ginuwine | Timbaland (as background vocals) |
| "One In A Million" | Aaliyah | Missy Elliott (as background vocals) |
| "Oops (Oh My)" | Tweet | Missy Elliott |
| "Pony" | Ginuwine | Timbaland & Magoo, Playa (as background vocals) |
| "Same Ol' G" | Ginuwine | Timbaland |
| "So Anxious" | Ginuwine | Timbaland Playa (as background vocals) |
| "Take Away" | Missy Elliott | Ginuwine, Tweet |
| "The Rain (Supa Dupa Fly)" | Missy Elliott | Timbaland (as background vocals) |
| "Try Again" | Aaliyah | Timbaland Static Major |
| Final Warning | Ginuwine | Aaliyah Static Major |
| "Up Jumps Da Boogie" | Timbaland & Magoo | Missy Elliot, Aaliyah |
| "We Need A Resolution" | Aaliyah | Timbaland, Static Major |
| "What's So Different" | Ginuwine | Timbaland (as background vocals) |

Timbaland's collaboration through compilation with 'Swing Mob' partners 'Superfriends'
| Artists | Album | Featured Artitsts | Label/Distribution | Year |
|---|---|---|---|---|
| Timbaland | Tim's Bio: Life from da Bassment | Aaliyah, Ginuwine, Magoo, Missy Elliott, Playa, Skillz | Blackground Records/Empire Distribution | 1998/2021 |

- Timbaland, Missy Elliott, and Static Major were actively been involved in majority of the collective works, with Timbaland serving as the predominant producer on majority of the songs on multiple albums. However the three do not serve as writer and producer on every song on each albums. The eight artists of the collective also appear and feature on multiple tracks on various albums also sharing writers credit. Many of the tracks may not have been marketed as a single, which of the above is a select few.
- The Term Superfriends, coined by the collective crew themselves, was a reference to them being superheroes, changing music every chance they got in order to save the world, as claimed by both Missy and Timbaland. It also comes from the track "Best Friends"(Featuring Aaliyah), with Missy explaining that they would come together as super friends. It also derives from the term 'supergroup', the collaboration of the urban R&B/Pop team being composed of music producers, writers, rappers and singers all from the Da Bassment Camp as well as solo artists who were becoming successful in their own right.

== After Swing Mob ==
Some former Swing Mob members ultimately went on to establish their own record labels. Missy Elliott founded the Goldmind Inc., while Timbaland founded Mosley Music Group and the now-defunct Beat Club Records. After Playa broke up, member Static Major found mainstream success in writing songs for other artists including Aaliyah ("Try Again", "Are You That Somebody?"), Pretty Ricky ("Your Body"), and Lil Wayne ("Lollipop"). He eventually died in 2008 after complications from a medical procedure.

Ginuwine and Timbaland would eventually fall out with one another, but relations remain close between the other former members of the Swing Mob and Superfriends collectives.

== Swing Mob discography ==
=== Da Bassment ===
- 1993: Da Bassment Cru (Swing Mob/EastWest)

=== Sista ===
- 1994: 4 All the Sistas Around da World (Elektra)

=== Sugah ===
- 1997: Untitled Album (unreleased) (Swing Mob)

=== Mad Skillz ===
- 1996: From Where??? (Big Beat/Atlantic)
- 2002: I Ain't Mad No More (Rawkus)

=== Missy Elliott ===
- 1997: Supa Dupa Fly (Goldmind/Elektra/Violator)
- 1999: Da Real World (Goldmind/Elektra/Violator)
- 2001: Miss E… So Addictive (Goldmind/Elektra/Violator)

=== Timbaland and Magoo ===
- 1995: S.B.I. AKA Surrounded By Idiots (unreleased (Swing Mob)
- 1997: Welcome To Our World (Blackground)
- 1998: Tim's Bio: Life from da Bassment (Blackground)
- 2001: Indecent Proposal (Blackground)

=== Playa ===
- 1995: Playa (unreleased) (Swing Mob)
- 1998: Cheers 2 U (Def Jam)
- 2003: Never Too Late (shelved) (Blackground/Def Jam)
- 2009: Unreleased Compilation

=== Ginuwine ===
- 1995: Tornado (unreleased) (Swing Mob)
- 1996: Ginuwine...The Bachelor (550 Music/Epic)
- 1999: 100% Ginuwine (550 Music/Epic)
- 2001: The Life (550 Music/Epic)

=== Tweet ===
- 2002: Southern Hummingbird (Atlantic)

=== Dalvin DeGrate ===
- 2000: Met.A.Mor.Phic (Maverick)

=== Renee Anderson ===
- 1995: Untitled Album (unreleased) (Dajhelon/MCA/EMI/Swing Mob)

=== Bazaar Royale ===
- 1995: Untitled Album (As Da Boogieman)(unreleased) (Swing Mob)
- 2003: What's It All For? (Def Jam/Ruff Ryders/Bloodline)

=== Soundtracks ===
- 1994: Above the Rim
- 1995: Dangerous Minds
- 1996: The Nutty Professor
- 1998: Dr. Dolittie
- 2000: Romeo Must Die
