= 100% Ginuwine =

1999 studio album by Ginuwine

Studio album by Ginuwine
- Released: March 16, 1999
- Recorded: 1997–1998
- Genre: R&B; hip-hop soul
- Length: 71:34
- Label: 550 Music; Epic
- Producer: Timbaland; Ted Bishop; Jonathan "Mookie" Morant

Ginuwine chronology
Ginuwine... the Bachelor (1996)	100% Ginuwine (1999)	The Life (2001)

Singles from 100% Ginuwine
- 1. "Same Ol' G" Released: July 28, 1998; 2. "What's So Different?" Released: February 16, 1999; 3. "So Anxious" Released: June 1, 1999; 4. "None of Ur Friends Business" Released: October 23, 1999

100% Ginuwine is the second studio album from American R&B recording artist Ginuwine. It was released on March 16, 1999, on 550 Music and distributed through Epic Records. The album peaked at number 5 on the US Billboard 200 and reached the second spot on the R&B Albums chart. The album was certified Gold in June 1999 and double Platinum by August 2000. It featured the singles "Same Ol' G", "What's So Different?", "So Anxious", and "None of Ur Friends Business".

== Background ==
While the massive level of success for Ginuwine... the Bachelor put an enormous amount of pressure on Ginuwine as he prepared his follow-up album, much of 100% Ginuwine was written in just over a month's time, with most recording sessions taking place in New York over two months in 1998.

== Promotion ==
Lead single "Same Ol' G," also featured on the soundtrack to the fantasy comedy film Dr. Dolittle, failed to become a hit on the US Billboard Hot 100 hit, but made a mark on the radio, peaking at number eleven on Billboard's R&B/Hip-Hop Airplay chart. Second single "What's So Different?" found some chart success, but failed to cross over on the level of previous singles, peaking at number 49 on the US Billboard Hot 100. Unsatisfied with the singles runs from 100% Ginuwine, Ginunwine and his team settled on "So Anxious" as the album's third single, which they considered the "main joint" on 100% Ginuwine. The song became its highest-charting single, reaching number 16 on the US Billboard Hot 100 and number two on the Hot R&B/Hip-Hop Songs chart. "None of Ur Friends Business" was issued as the album's fourth and final single in October 1999 and became another top ten hit on the Hot R&B/Hip-Hop Songs chart.

== Critical reception ==
Professional ratings
Review scores
Source	Rating
AllMusic	4/5 stars
Robert Christgau	(2-star Honorable Mention)
Entertainment Weekly	B+
Muzik	3/5 stars
NME	3/5 stars
Q	4/5 stars
Rolling Stone	3.5/5 stars
Spin	7/10

AllMusic editor Stephen Thomas Erlewine found that "100% Ginuwine uses The Bachelor as a blueprint but goes further, boasting more inventive productions and a stronger set of songs. If nothing grabs the ear like "Pony," most of the songs slowly work their way underneath the skin, revealing themselves as either seductive ballads or ingratiating dancefloor numbers. Timbaland continues to prove that he's one of the savviest producers in modern hip-hop and soul, but Ginuwine remains the star of the show, thanks to his rich, inviting voice." Entertainment Weekly's Matt Diehl called the album a "sensual peek into a futuristic bachelor boudoir of soul. Superproducer Timbaland attacks his duties with such fervor you'd think it was his solo album. On ballads or bumpers, Timbaland’s technotronic array of Jeep beats, feisty flamenco guitars, and Queen ”Flash Gordon” samples makes the proceedings 100% genuinely groovealicious." Yahoo! Music UK write that 100% Ginuwine was given "the golden-touch by R&B's hottest property, production genius Timbaland [who] really is the don of this style of production, mixing hip-hop vibes with latin influences and forging a entirely original R&B sound."

Barry Walters from Rolling Stone found it "refreshing when an R&B loverman gets smoove without the schmaltz. The bump-'n'-grinding set of granite abs known as Ginuwine doesn't flaunt the monster lung power of a Johnny Gill, yet superstar producer and soul savior Timbaland transforms G's vocal limitations into sonic soap-opera realness. Amping up the delicious excesses of Ginuwine's debut, Ginuwine... the Bachelor, Timbaland turns every track into high, often hilarious drama with libidinous lyrics, slow-burning hooks, cinematic sound effects and more crafty rhythmic maneuvers than the Oval Office." Billboard felt that 100% Ginuwine "improves on the template for romantic hip-hop/soul antics established by 1996 debut album." He wrote that "that old-school love is echoed and made even more persuasive, according to today's hardcore standards, by mostly Timbaland-produced, emotionally wrought tracks constructed from stacks of thick, dramatic chords, lush background harmonies, and banging hip-hop beats." The Source note that 100% Ginuwine "maximizes radio play possibilities [...] Tim's jungle music influences run rampant [...] Ginuwine incorporates sensitive, Kenny Lattimore-like admissions, a style original macks tend to lack." Vibe felt that 100% Ginuwine was "progressive and sophisticated from a musical standpoint."

== Commercial performance ==
100% Ginuwine debuted and peaked at number five on the US Billboard 200 and number two on the Top R&B/Hip-Hop Albums chart. It was certified Gold by the Recording Industry Association of America (RIAA) June 17, 1999 and reached Platinum status on July 7, 1999 and 2× Platinum staus on August 2, 2000. By September 1999, 100% Ginuwine had sold 914,000 copies in the United States. By August 2013, the album had sold more than 2 million copies, according to Billboard.

== Track listing ==
100% Ginuwine track listing
No.	Title	Music	Producer(s)	Length
1.	"Little Kidz"	Elgin Lumpkin	Timbaland	0:48
2.	"Little Man's Bangin Lude"	Randy Edelman; Timothy Mosley	Timbaland	2:36
3.	"What's So Different?"	Thomas Boyce; Bobby Hart; Lumpkin; Mosley	Timbaland	3:55
4.	"So Anxious"	Benjamin Bush; Stephen Garrett; Mosley	Timbaland	4:35
5.	"None of Ur Friends Business"/"Interlude"	Lumpkin; Mosley	Timbaland	6:05
6.	"Wait a Minute"	Lumpkin; Mosley	Timbaland	4:42
7.	"I Know"	Lumpkin; Jonathan "Mookie" Morant	Morant; Ginuwine^{[a]}	4:13
8.	"Do You Remember"/"Interlude"	Lumpkin; Brian May; Mosley	Timbaland	6:09
9.	"No. 1 Fan"	Babbs; Mosley	Timbaland	4:19
10.	"Final Warning"/"Interlude" (featuring Aaliyah)	Garrett; Mosley	Timbaland	7:23
11.	"I'm Crying Out"	Lumpkin; Mosley	Timbaland	5:12
12.	"Two Sides to a Story"	Lumpkin; Mosley	Timbaland	5:01
13.	"Same Ol' G"	Jimmy Douglass; Garrett; Mosley	Timbaland	4:19
14.	"All Nite All Day"/"Interlude"	Johntá Austin; Teddy Bishop; Lumpkin	Bishop	6:03
15.	"Toe 2 Toe"	Lumpkin; Mosley	Timbaland	2:14
16.	"She's Out of My Life"	Tom Bahler	Morant	4:00
Total length:				71:34

Notes

- ^{^[a]} denotes co-producer

Samples

- "Little Man's Bangin Lude" contains a sample from the "MacGyver Theme" as composed by Randy Edelman
- "What's So Different?" contains a sample from "Valleri" as recorded by the Monkees
- "Do You Remember" contains a sample from Queen's "Flash's Theme"

== Personnel ==
- A&R – Michael Caplan
- Arranging – Giovanni Christian Morant
- Art direction – Julian, Kiku
- Assistant engineering – Alan Armitage, Soloman Jackson, Todd Wachsmuth
- Composing – Johntá Austin, Tank, Ted Bishop, Timbaland
- Conducting – Giovanni Christian Morant
- Design – Julian, Kiku
- Drumming – Jonathan "Mookie" Morant
- Engineering – Dylan Dresdow, Kevin Hicks, Tommie Hicks, Jr., Senator Jimmy D, Joe Smith
- Executive production – Ginuwine, Barry Hankerson, Harry Hankerson, Jomo Hankerson
- Fender rhodes – Shaun Fisher
- Flute – Obie Morant
- Grooming – Linda Mason
- Guitar – Jimmy Douglass, Dave Foreman, Jonathan "Mookie" Morant, Bill Pettaway
- Guitar (bass) – Jonathan "Mookie" Morant, Dante Nolen
- Keyboards – Jonathan "Mookie" Morant
- Mastering – Chris Gehringer
- Mixing – Jimmy Douglass, Timbaland
- Performer(s) – Aaliyah, Elsie Muniz
- Photography – Michael Benabib, Daniela Federici
- Production – Ted Bishop, Ginuwine, Jonathan "Mookie" Morant, Timbaland
- Sax (soprano) – Obie Morant
- Strings – Craig Brockman, Norma Huff, Doug Pritchard, Jennie Rudberg
- Stylist – Tameka Foster
- Vocals – Aaliyah, Dave Foreman, Ginuwine, Elsie Muniz, Louise C. West
- Vocals (background) – Aaliyah, Tank, Ginuwine, Jonathan "Mookie" Morant, Louise C. West

== Charts ==
=== Weekly charts ===
Weekly chart performance for 100% Ginuwine
Chart (1999)	Peak position
Dutch Albums (Album Top 100)	23
German Albums (Offizielle Top 100)	40
UK Albums (OCC)	42
UK R&B Albums (OCC)	5
US Billboard 200	5
US Top R&B/Hip-Hop Albums (Billboard)	2

=== Year-end charts ===
1999 year-end chart performance for 100% Ginuwine
Chart (1999)	Position
US Billboard 200	66
US Top R&B/Hip-Hop Albums (Billboard)	17

2000 year-end chart performance for 100% Ginuwine
Chart (2000)	Position
US Top R&B/Hip-Hop Albums (Billboard)	97

== Certifications ==
Certifications for 100% Ginuwine
Region	Certification	Certified units/sales
United States (RIAA)	2× Platinum	2,000,000^{^}
^{^} Shipments figures based on certification alone.
