= Ginuwine... the Bachelor =

Studio album by Ginuwine
- Released: October 8, 1996
- Studios: Pyramid Sound Studios (Ithaca, NY)
- Genre: R&B
- Length: 63:35
- Labels: 550 Music; Epic
- Producer: Timbaland

Ginuwine chronology
Ginuwine... the Bachelor (1996)	100% Ginuwine (1999)

Singles from Ginuwine... the Bachelor
- 1. "Pony" Released: July 30, 1996; 2. "Tell Me Do U Wanna" Released: March 25, 1997; 3. "When Doves Cry" Released: July 25, 1997; 4. "I'll Do Anything/I'm Sorry" Released: September 9, 1997; 5. "Only When Ur Lonely" Released: September 9, 1997; 6. "Holler" Released: December 2, 1997

Ginuwine... the Bachelor is the debut studio album by American R&B singer Ginuwine. The second major Swing Mob album, it was chiefly produced by Timbaland and released October 8, 1996, on 550 Music. The distribution was handled through Epic Records. The album peaked at number 26 on the US Billboard 200 and reached number 14 on Billboard's R&B Albums chart. A steady seller, it was certified gold by January 1997. In March 1999, the album was certified double platinum in sales by the Recording Industry Association of America (RIAA), after sales exceeding two million copies in the United States. Ginuwine... the Bachelor featured the singles "Pony", "When Doves Cry" and "Holler".

== Critical reception ==
Professional ratings
Review scores
Source	Rating
AllMusic	4/5 stars
Robert Christgau	(3-star Honorable Mention)
Q	4/5 stars
The Rolling Stone Album Guide	2/5 stars
USA Today	2.5/4 stars

Robert Christgau sumed the album as "mack beats bumped and grounded." In his retrospective review for AllMusic, editor Rob Theakston noted that with Ginuwine... the Bachelor Ginuwine "upped the sexual reference ante for many up-and-coming male singers such as Dru Hill, Blackstreet, and such established producers as R. Kelly. Combining the influences of funk, quiet storm, soul, and even a bit of electro, Ginuwine effortlessly displays not only a powerful voice, but sharp songwriting and production skills. Ginuwine... the Bachelor was a promising debut and only a slight notion of great things to come." USA Today critic Steve Jones wrote that Ginuwine "seems a lot less concerned about getting the mood right. He wants to get right to it." He noted that while a sexual theme runs throughout the album, Ginuwine "keeps you engaged by avoiding standard-issue crooning," instead exuding "sensuality and attitude over throbbing beats."

== Track listing ==
All music by Timbaland.

No.	Title	Writer(s)	Length
1.	"Intro"	Lumpkin	1:41
2.	"Pony"	Stephen Garrett; Lumpkin; Mosley	5:24
3.	"Tell Me Do U Wanna"	Jimmy Douglass; Lumpkin; Mosley; Reives	5:34
4.	"Holler" (featuring Virginia "Nikki" Slim)	Lumpkin; Mosley; Siplin	5:04
5.	"Hello"	Lumpkin; Mosley	4:06
6.	"Lonely Daze"	Barcliff; Lumpkin; Mosley; Thom Bell; Linda Creed	4:55
7.	"Ginuwine 4 Ur Mind"	Reives; Lumpkin; Mosley	5:22
8.	"Only When Ur Lonely"	Reives; Lumpkin; Mosley	5:49
9.	"I'll Do Anything/I'm Sorry"	Elliott; Mosley; Stevie Wonder	4:14
10.	"World Is So Cold"	Lumpkin; Mosley	5:02
11.	"When Doves Cry"	Prince	5:08
12.	"G. Thang" (featuring Missy "Misdemeanor" Elliott and Magoo)	Barcliff; Geoff Barrow; Elliott; Beth Gibbons; Mosley; Adrian Utley; Williams	4:29
13.	"550 What?" (featuring Timbaland)	Lumpkin; Mosley	6:47

Samples

- "Intro" contains portions of dialogue from the motion picture The Usual Suspects and a sample of "The Greatest Trick", written by John Ottman for the soundtrack.
- "Lonely Daze" contains a sample of "You Are Everything", written by Thom Bell, Linda Creed, as performed by the Stylistics
- "I'll Do Anything/I'm Sorry" contains a sample from "Visions" as recorded by Stevie Wonder.
- "G. Thang" contains samples from "Numb" by Portishead, "The Boomin' System" by LL Cool J, "Brown Sugar" by D'Angelo

== Personnel ==
- Art direction – Cozbi Sanchez-Cabrera
- Assembling – Alex Perialas, Jerry Conaway Jr
- Assistant engineering – Jason Arnold
- Coordination – Nadine Hemy
- Engineering – Jimmy Douglass, Alex Perialas
- Executive production – Ginuwine, Robert Reives
- Grooming – Isabel le Page
- Mastering – Vlad
- Mixing – Jimmy Douglass
- Photography – Carl Lessard
- Production – Ginuwine, Robert Reives, Timbaland
- Rapping – (Ex) Cat Heads, Magoo, Missy Elliott, Nikki/Virginia Slim, Timbaland
- Stylist – Estée Ochoa
- Vocals – Ginuwine
- Vocals (background) – Ginuwine, Missy Elliott, Timbaland Static Major Digital Black Smoke E. Digglera

== Charts ==
=== Weekly charts ===
Weekly chart performance for Ginuwine... the Bachelor
Chart (1996–1997)	Peak position
Australian Albums (ARIA)	75
Canada Top Albums/CDs (RPM)	30
Dutch Albums (Album Top 100)	18
German Albums (Offizielle Top 100)	54
New Zealand Albums (RMNZ)	50
UK Albums (Official Charts)	85
UK R&B Albums (Official Charts)	8
US Billboard 200	26
US Top R&B/Hip-Hop Albums (Billboard)	14

=== Year-end charts ===
Year-end chart performance for Ginuwine... the Bachelor
Chart (1997)	Position
Dutch Albums (Album Top 100)	83
US Billboard 200	48
US Top R&B/Hip-Hop Albums (Billboard)	21

== Certifications ==
Certifications for Ginuwine... the Bachelor
Region	Certification	Certified units/sales
Canada (Music Canada)	Gold	50,000^{^}
United Kingdom (BPI)	Silver	60,000^{*}
United States (RIAA)	2× Platinum	2,000,000^{^}
^{*} Sales figures based on certification alone.^{^} Shipments figures based on certification alone.
