= Tell Me Do U Wanna =

Single by Ginuwine

from the album Ginuwine... the Bachelor
- Released: March 25, 1997
- Length: 4:18
- Label: 550 Music; Epic
- Songwriters: Elgin Lumpkin; Timothy Mosley; Robert Reives; Jimmy Douglass
- Producer: Timbaland

Ginuwine singles chronology
"Pony" (1996)	"Tell Me Do U Wanna" (1997)	"When Doves Cry" (1997)

"Tell Me Do U Wanna" is a song by American R&B singer Ginuwine. It was written by Robert Reives, Jimmy Douglass, and Timbaland for his debut studio album Ginuwine... the Bachelor (1996), while production was helmed by the latter. It was released as the album's second single released in March 1997 and reached the top 20 on the UK Singles Chart.

== Music video ==
The official music video for the song was directed by Michael Lucero.

== Track listing ==
CD maxi-single
No.	Title	Producer(s)	Length
1.	"Tell Me Do U Wanna" (Single Version)	Timbaland	4:18
2.	"Tell Me Do U Wanna" (Paleface Mix)	Timbaland; DJ Paleface^{[a]}	5:47
3.	"Tell Me Do U Wanna" (G-Club Mix)	Timbaland; David Barratt^{[a]}	7:10
4.	"Tell Me Do U Wanna" (Natty & Slaps Mix)	Timbaland; Natty & Slaps^{[a]}	4:54

Notes

- ^{^a} denotes additional producer

== Charts ==
Chart (1997)	Peak position
Australia (ARIA)	100
New Zealand (Recorded Music NZ)	21
Scotland (OCC)	88
UK Singles (OCC)	16
UK Hip Hop/R&B (OCC)	5
US Radio Songs (Billboard)	55
US R&B/Hip-Hop Airplay (Billboard)	14
US Rhythmic (Billboard)	10
