= That's Why I Lie =

Single by Ray J

from the album Dr. Dolittle O.S.T.
- Released: September 22, 1998
- Genre: R&B
- Length: 3:51
- Label: Atlantic
- Songwriter(s): Rodney Jerkins, Isaac Phillips, LaShawn Daniels, Traci Hale, Nycolia Turman

Ray J singles chronology
"Everything You Want" (1997)	"That's Why I Lie" (1998)	"Another Day in Paradise" (2001)

"That's Why I Lie" is a single by Ray J from the Dr. Dolittle soundtrack. The song charted at #22 in New Zealand and #71 on the UK Singles Chart. The song was produced by Rodney Jerkins, and was later sampled on Brandy's 1998 album Never Say Never.

== Track listing ==
1. That's Why I Lie (Radio Version)
2. That's Why I Lie (Album Version)
3. That's Why I Lie (Instrumental)

== Charts ==
Chart performance for That's Why I Lie
Chart (1998)	Peak position
UK Singles (OCC)	71
