= Are You That Somebody? =

1998 single by Aaliyah

Single by Aaliyah

from the album Dr. Dolittle
- Released: May 26, 1998
- Recorded: 1998
- Studio: Capitol (Los Angeles)
- Genre: R&B; pop; avant-funk; soul
- Length: 4:26
- Label: Blackground; Atlantic
- Songwriters: Stephen Garrett; Timothy Mosley
- Producer: Timbaland

Aaliyah singles chronology
"Journey to the Past" (1998)	"Are You That Somebody?" (1998)	"I Don't Wanna" (2000)

Timbaland singles chronology
"Hot Like Fire" (1997)	"Are You That Somebody?" (1998)	"Get on the Bus" (1998)

Audio sample
- file; help

Music video
- "Are You That Somebody?" on YouTube

"Are You That Somebody?" is a song by American singer Aaliyah from the Dr. Dolittle soundtrack (1998). It was written by Static Major and Timbaland, with the latter producing it, in addition to performing a guest rap. It was sent to urban contemporary radio stations in the United States on May 26, 1998, by Blackground Records and Atlantic Records. Musically, it is an R&B, pop, and avant-funk song with hip-hop influences. Its production also incorporates other instrumentals such as staccato guitars, beatboxing, and drum and bass. Lyrically, it is about the narrator (Aaliyah) keeping an intimate relationship a secret due to her celebrity status.

Upon its release, the song received critical acclaim from music critics, with them praising its off-beat innovative production. In 1999, Aaliyah earned a Grammy Award nomination for Best Female R&B Vocal Performance for the song. Initially, it was ineligible to chart on the Billboard Hot 100, mainly because it was an airplay single not commercially released to retail stores. In December 1998, Billboard changed its policy to allow airplay-only songs to chart on the Hot 100, and the song eventually peaked at number 21. Internationally, the song achieved even greater commercial success, peaking at number one in New Zealand and number three in the Netherlands. It also peaked at number 11 in Canada and the United Kingdom.

An accompanying music video for "Are You That Somebody?" was directed by Mark Gerard. It is a dance-heavy video that depicts Aaliyah and other dancers all dancing in a cave before a backdrop that features clips of the Dr. Dolittle motion picture. The video received acclaim from the music industry, receiving Best R&B Video and Best Video from a Film nominations at the 1999 MTV Video Music Awards. The video also earned a nomination for Outstanding Music Video at the NAACP Image Awards. Throughout the years, critics have praised the video for its choreography, with many highlighting the flamenco routine depicted in the final scene.

== Recording and production ==
"Are You That Somebody?" was recorded at Capitol Studios in Los Angeles. Engineer Jimmy Douglass, explained that the recording session for the song was "a soup-to-nuts session", meaning that the entire song was recorded and mixed in one session. The group worked on the song from 11:00 p.m. to 9:00 a.m. with last additions of the song being the baby noises and Timbaland's ad-libs. While creating the beat for "Are You That Somebody?", Timbaland was inspired by the 'Oompa Loompa' song from the Willy Wonka & the Chocolate Factory film (1971). According to him, "I took that rhythm and I listened back to it and I was like, 'Man. that's a dope addition.' That's what I was trying to attempt but in a hip-hop way. … I gotta thank Willy Wonka for that".

Timbaland got the idea to include realistic noises in the songs production due to his beliefs that "life is full of music". "As soon as you wake up, hearing the trees, that's music. Hearing the crickets, that's music. I feel like everything that we do is music. When you come outside, listen to the trees, the birds, the crickets, the animals, they all make music", says Timabaland. The baby sample used in the song came from him listening to a '60s compilation featuring various sound effects. He stated: "So I was going through my effects sounds, and I heard this baby. Was it a baby, was it a chicken, there was a cow, there was Godzilla, this whole row. And this baby came across, and it was laughing, and that [one sound] wasn't the whole thing. It was like [imitates four consecutive baby giggles]. I got to that one part, and as soon as the beat came on, I just hit the button". Initially, he didn't think that the baby sound effect would fit into the production. After having a conversation with Aaliyah, he decided to include it. She herself commented on the addition of the baby sound bite saying, "Oh that's so cute!".

== Music and lyrics ==
Musically, "Are You That Somebody?" is an R&B, pop, avant-funk, and soul song. BET labeled the record as R&B/pop and said its production was trip hop inspired. Journalist Larry Flick from Billboard, felt that Aaliyah had returned to her funk/hip-hop roots on the record. Shaheem Reid from MTV News described the song as "funked-out" and "bounce-infused". Its production features a variety of sounds, such as frenetic staccato guitars, beatboxing, and drum and bass courtesy of drum programming. Flick described the guitar riff as, "jiggly", and thought that it gives "the track the feel good vibe of a '70s-era throw down". Other sounds that are utilized within the instrumental is a sample of a baby crying and laughing, taken from producer Jac Holzman's 1964 track "Happy Baby" from Authentic Sound Effects Volume 8. In addition, the song has a neotango rhythm with Aaliyah displaying "coy vocals". She also has a "no-nonsense delivery" and sings the opening line 'boy', "like she's creating a perfectly round bubble of sound, drawing out the vowel and vibrating it.

Lyrically, "Are You That Somebody?" is about a "late-night rendezvous with a special someone that needed to be kept on the hush". According to Billboard, the lyrics "describe love like a secret, and if this boy is let in on it, he can't tell nobody". On the song, Aaliyah issues a "will you still love me tomorrow sentiment". Quentin B. Huff from PopMatters, said her "sweet but street" persona is in full effect, as she declares: "Sometimes I'm goody-goody / Right now I'm naughty naughty." Huff also noted, there's also a sense of longing in the appearance of the song's title ("'Cause I really need somebody / Tell me are you that somebody") and in the way Aaliyah performed it, stretching out the syllables to the point of desperation and then keeping up with the beat with "hurried, jumbled phrasings".

== Critical reception ==
Oliver VanDervoort from AXS said it was the "absolute catchiest of all of her songs", and that the "lyrics are simple enough, as it's a girl looking for the right love but the song is done in a way that makes you want to get up and dance." Larry Flick from Billboard felt that Aaliyah was on her way towards becoming "the New Queen of soundtrack hits" because of "Are You That Somebody?". Flick also praised the song for its smooth melody and clever lyrics, saying: "At the same time it has a smooth melody and clever lyrics that will connect with folks who require traditional structure in their pop music." Damien Scott from Complex felt that "Are You That Somebody?" perfectly captured multiple traits found on Aaliyah's first two albums, Age Ain't Nothing but a Number (1994) and One in a Million (1996). According to Scott, "Aaliyah's oeuvre was an exercise in self-awareness. Her first two albums carefully toed the line between adolescence and adulthood, displaying a woman exploring the terrain of love, trust, and lust; one who exuded a playful innocence while hinting at a more sultry side. Her crowning achievement, a collaboration between her, Timbaland, and Static Major, 'Are You That Somebody,' would capture all of that perfectly". The Gavin Report labeled the song as a "booty-movin' jam" and wrote that,"the angel-voiced Aaliyah lays down the law to a potential lover". Ultimately, the publication predicted the song would "hit big".

Music Week described the songs production as "syncopated" and "jerky", ultimately they felt that it "showcases Aaliyah's deceptively simple R&B vocal." Quentin B. Huff from PopMatters feels that the song "is just too good to be relegated to soundtrack status". He continued praising the song by saying: "It's a fantastic track, with a stomping rhythm alternatingly accented by the strangest bundle of noise. It sounds like someone shaking dice or cracking their knuckles or twisting a Rubik's Cube really fast -- I can never decide which". In its Album Guide, Rolling Stone commented that the song "remains one of '90s R&B's most astounding moments." In 1999, Spin included the song on their top 20 singles list and they felt that Aaliyah's vocals and Timbaland's production on the song was like "an R&B singin in the rain".

In 2021, Billboard and Complex ranked the song at number two and number one, respectively, on their lists of the greatest Aaliyah songs. In a retrospective review, Billboard felt that "The goofy AF 1998 Eddie Murphy remake of the 1967 box office bomb Dr. Dolittle did not deserve one of the absolute greatest R&B jams of the '90s". Overall, they declared the song as defining the late '90s, and continuing "to chart a course for the future". Variety writers declared that "Are You That Somebody?" was an "ultimate Aaliyah song" and that it's a 1998 "classic". They also highlighted how, "Aaliyah brings this record to life with her soft-song chorus as she lays down the laws for a secret rendezvous; it's also one of the more sexually forthright tracks from Aaliyah's catalog, and lyrics like "sometimes I'm goody-goody, right now I'm naughty-naughty".

== Accolades ==
Awards and nominations for "Are You That Somebody?"
Year	Award	Category	Result	Ref.
1999	NAACP Image Award	Outstanding Music Video	Nominated	
1999	Grammy Award	Best Female R&B Vocal Performance	Nominated	
1999	Nickelodeon Kids' Choice Award	Favorite Song	Nominated	
1999	MTV Movie Award	Best Song from a Movie	Nominated	
1999	Soul Train Lady of Soul Award	Best R&B/Soul Song	Nominated	
1999	Soul Train Lady of Soul Award	Best R&B/Soul or Rap Music Video	Nominated	
1999	MTV Video Music Award	Best R&B Video	Nominated	
1999	MTV Video Music Award	Best Video from a Film	Nominated	

Rankings for "Are You That Somebody?"
Year	Publication	Accolade	Rank	Ref.
1999	Spin	Top 20 Singles of the 1990s	18	
2005	Blender	The 500 Greatest Songs Since You Were Born	387	
2010	Pitchfork	The Top 200 Tracks of the 1990s	8	
2011	Slant Magazine	The 100 Best Singles of the 1990s	19	
2017	Spin	The 30 Best '90s R&B Songs	1	
2018	Billboard	The 98 Greatest Songs of 1998: Critics' Picks	1	
2018	Rolling Stone	The 98 Best Songs of 1998: Pop's Weirdest Year	5	
2019	Rolling Stone	50 Best Songs of the Nineties	24	
2021	Rolling Stone	The 500 Greatest Songs of All Time	238	
2022	Elle	The 65 Best '90s Pop Songs	–	
2022	Pitchfork	The 250 Best Songs of the 1990's	3	

== Commercial performance ==
"Are You That Somebody?" wasn't released commercially to retail stores in the United States, therefore the song's chart success depended solely on radio airplay. During its chart run, Billboard changed its policy to allow airplay-only singles to chart on the Billboard Hot 100, starting with the chart issued December 5, 1998. Prior to this, "Are You That Somebody?" was eligible to enter only airplay charts in the US, peaking at number four on the Radio Songs chart on October 10. In August, the song peaked atop both the Hot R&B Airplay and Rhythmic Top 40 charts, while in November, it peaked at number six on the Mainstream Top 40 chart. On December 5, the song debuted and peaked at number 21 on the Billboard Hot 100. In Canada, the song peaked at number 11, as well as reaching number two on the urban chart on August 31, 1998. Following its 2021 digital release, "Are You That Somebody?" debuted and peaked at number 50 on the US Digital Song Sales chart for the week of September 25, 2021.

Internationally, "Are You That Somebody?" peaked at number 40 on the Ultratop 50 Wallonia chart in Belgium. In Germany, the song entered the singles chart at number 91 on November 9, 1998 and peaked at number 31 on January 25, 1999. In the Netherlands, the song entered the Single Top 100 chart at number 65 on October 17 and peaked at number three on November 14, 1998, the position in which it remained at for a total of three weeks; it also peaked at number three on the Dutch Top 40 for a total of three weeks. In the United Kingdom, the song peaked at number 11 on the UK Singles Chart on September 12, 1998. The song also peaked within the top five on the UK R&B and dance charts at numbers two and four, respectively. According to the Official Charts Company (OCC), "Are You That Somebody?" is Aaliyah's third best-selling single in the country. In New Zealand, the song debuted at number 43 on October 4, 1998 and peaked atop the singles chart the following week.

== Music video ==
=== Background and synopsis ===
Originally, Hype Williams was to direct the Music Video for "Are You That Somebody?" while choreography was orchestrated by Fatima Robinson. Williams, however, pulled out of the project due to other commitments, and Mark Gerard jumped on board. Gerard decided to film the video inside a cave after seeing the choreography done by Robinson. According to Robinson, "when the next director came in and saw what we had done, he was like, The dance is so strong, why don't I just put it inside beautiful architectural pieces and build some pieces inside of a cave and stuff like that? Let me just focus on the dance." The videos filming location took place in a cave at Griffith Park in Los Angeles. The cave in which it was filmed in was the same cave used as the Batcave in the original Batman series (1966).

The video begins with Timbaland and a crew of men riding motorcycles to a cave where Aaliyah and other women are waiting in. As Timbaland and his crew arrive, a hologram of a metal door seals the opening of the cave. The men notice that the seal is a hologram and drive through it. Inside the cave, clips of Dr. Dolittle are projected on several walls in the background. As Aaliyah's first verse starts, she holds a large bird on her arm and everyone begins to perform the choreography. There are scenes with just the women dancing, just the men dancing, both the women and men dancing, and Aaliyah performing alone. The group Playa makes an appearance in the background. The video ends with Aaliyah and the dancers performing a flamenco dance.

=== Fashion ===
In the video Aaliyah wore a Gucci bathing suit according to her former stylist Derek Lee. Lee spoke on her choice of clothing for the video with Complex saying, "No. It wasn't a lot for them because it was $4,000 Gucci bathing suit. It was expensive so yeah, she wanted to show it. And that green look that she was wearing was all Girbaud. The skirt was a Gucci knockoff. I had someone make that and then just add a bit of flair to it". In an interview with Nylon, Lee further explained that the bathing suit was embedded with hand done blood-red Swarovski crystals. In the final scene of the video Aaliyah wears a custom made high-slit skirt. Lee wanted her final look for the big dance scene to have a push in terms of her style. "I had it custom-done for her, too. It kind of bit off of the Gucci design and added some other stuff to it. [Choreographer] Fatima was like, 'You have to do that. You have to do the heels, you have to do this. It's time. It would be hot at the end, for you to flip [your outfit] because no one's ever seen you do this", says Lee.

=== Release and reception ===
During its chart run, the music video for "Are You That Somebody?" received heavy television airplay on multiple music oriented network channels. The video first made its premiere the week ending June 7, 1998 on BET, MTV, and The Box. For the week ending July 5, 1998, the video was the second most-played video on BET. For the week ending July 25, 1998, the video was the most played video on The Box. Between September 20–27, 1998, the video was the most played video on MTV. The video was featured on Complex's "The Best R&B Videos of the '90s" list; editor Ernest Baker praised the video by saying Aaliyah's clothing and choreography in the video were "revolutionary and groundbreaking". VH1 recognized "Are You That Somebody?" in their list of Best R&B Music Video Choreography of the 1990s and 2000s. Grace Stansci from Yahoo! thought, "One of the sexiest sequences in this clip comes at the end when Aaliyah dons a skirt with high slits on both sides and heels and dances the flamenco, which was something her choreographer came up with". BET said that "Fatima Robinson got behind the scenes for this video and managed to work in the energetic Flamenco dance with Aaliyah's laid-back hip hop moves, perfectly complementing Timbaland's production." Nylon writer Steffanee Wang praised the video as she felt that "Aaliyah's dancing — fluid and sensual — takes center stage in this futuristic visual that remains one of the best and concise displays of her sheer talent and magnitude."

== Legacy ==
Music critic Simon Reynolds cited "Are You That Somebody?" as "the most radical pop single" of 1998. Kelefah Sanneh of The New York Times wrote that the twitchy, beat-driven songs of Destiny's Child owe a clear debt to 'Are You That Somebody'." BET labeled "Are You That Somebody?" as "one of the '90s R&B's most innovative, unforgettable songs". Adam Levine, the lead vocalist of the pop rock group Maroon 5, remembers that listening to "Are You That Somebody?" convinced him to pursue a more soulful sound than that of his then-band Kara's Flowers. Levine, also said that the song "is one of the most revolutionary-sounding songs ever recorded".

In March 2007, American indie rock band, Gossip, covered the song on BBC 6 Music. A full studio version was leaked in 2009 and later released on the Ministry of Sound Volume 2 compilation in 2010. In 2009, Canadian rapper Drake interpolated a portion of the song's chorus in his verse on Young Money Entertainment's "BedRock": "Girl I gotta watch my back, 'cause I'm not just anybody." In 2011, a cover with a rap verse by Wax was recorded by The Red Ribbon Army. Samples from the song have been used in numerous electronic, and, most recently, dubstep tracks. A prominent use of the sample was by James Blake on the track "CMYK" from his 2010 EP of the same name. In 2014, singer Banks performed an acoustic version of this song on BBC Radio 1's Live Lounge. In 2018, American a cappella group Pentatonix recorded the song as a medley combined with "New Rules" by Dua Lipa for their album PTX Presents: Top Pop, Vol. I.

In August 2021, it was reported that Aaliyah's recorded work for Blackground (since rebranded as Blackground Records 2.0) would be re-released on physical, digital, and, for the first time ever, streaming services in a deal between the label and Empire Distribution. "Are You That Somebody?" was re-released in October 2021 on both of Aaliyah's compilation albums I Care 4 U (2002) and Ultimate Aaliyah (2005). In 2023, American saxophonist Sam Gendel covered "Are You That Somebody?" on his ninth studio album Cookup. In May 2025, American rapper Latto interpolated the "I really need somebody, tell me you're that somebody" lyric from "Are You That Somebody?" in her single "Somebody".

== Track listings and formats ==
UK CD, 12-inch, and cassette single

1. "Are You That Somebody?" (album version) – 4:27
2. "Are You That Somebody?" (instrumental) – 4:26
3. "Are You That Somebody?" (a cappella) – 4:26

European CD single

1. "Are You That Somebody?" (album version) – 4:27
2. "Are You That Somebody?" (a cappella) – 4:27

== Charts ==
=== Weekly charts ===
Weekly chart performance for "Are You That Somebody?"
Chart (1998–1999)	Peak position
Belgium (Ultratop 50 Flanders)	42
Belgium (Ultratop 50 Wallonia)	40
Canada (Nielsen SoundScan)	11
Canada Dance/Urban (RPM)	2
Europe (European Hot 100 Singles)	60
Germany (GfK)	31
Netherlands (Dutch Top 40)	3
Netherlands (Single Top 100)	3
New Zealand (Recorded Music NZ)	1
Scottish Singles Sales (Official Charts)	56
Switzerland (Schweizer Hitparade)	41
UK Singles (Official Charts)	11
UK Dance (Official Charts)	4
UK Hip Hop/R&B (Official Charts)	2
US Billboard Hot 100	21
US Pop Airplay (Billboard)	6
US R&B/Hip-Hop Airplay (Billboard)	1
US Rhythmic Airplay (Billboard)	1
US Top 40 Tracks (Billboard)	9

Chart (2021)	Peak position
US R&B Digital Song Sales	6

=== Year-end charts ===
1998 year-end chart performance for "Are You That Somebody?"
Chart (1998)	Position
Canada Top Singles (RPM)	66
Canada Urban (RPM)	17
Netherlands (Dutch Top 40)	40
Netherlands (Single Top 100)	28
New Zealand (RIANZ)	26
US Hot R&B Airplay (Billboard)	7
US Mainstream Top 40 (Billboard)	38
US Rhythmic Top 40 (Billboard)	6

1999 year-end chart performance for "Are You That Somebody?"
Chart (1999)	Position
Netherlands (Dutch Top 40)	122
Netherlands (Single Top 100)	97
US Mainstream Top 40 (Billboard)	75
US Rhythmic Top 40 (Billboard)	63

== Certifications ==
Certifications for "Are You That Somebody?"
Region	Certification	Certified units/sales
Netherlands (NVPI)	Gold	50,000^{^}
New Zealand (RMNZ)	Platinum	30,000^{‡}
United Kingdom (BPI)	Silver	200,000^{‡}
United States (RIAA)	Gold	500,000^{‡}
^{^} Shipments figures based on certification alone.^{‡} Sales+streaming figures based on certification alone.

== Release history ==
Release dates and formats for "Are You That Somebody?"
Region	Date	Format(s)	Label(s)	Ref.
United States	May 26, 1998	Urban contemporary radio	Blackground; Atlantic	
United States	June 9, 1998	Rhythmic contemporary radio	Blackground; Atlantic	
United Kingdom	August 24, 1998	12-inch vinyl; cassette; CD	Atlantic	
Germany	October 26, 1998	Maxi CD	Warner Music	
Various	September 3, 2021	Digital download; streaming	Blackground; Empire	

== See also ==
- List of number-one singles from the 1990s (New Zealand)
- List of artists who reached number one on the U.S. Rhythmic chart
- Rolling Stone's 500 Greatest Songs of All Time

== Bibliography ==
- Brackett, Nathan; Hoard, Christian David (2004). "The Rolling Stone Album Guide". Rolling Stone. ISBN 978-0-7432-0169-8.
- Warner, Jennifer (2014). Aaliyah: A Biography. BookCap Study Guides. ISBN 9781629173597.
