= So Anxious =

Single by Ginuwine

from the album 100% Ginuwine
- Released: June 1, 1999
- Recorded: 1998
- Length: 4:35
- Label: 550 Music; Epic
- Songwriters: Benjamin Bush; Stephen Garrett; Timothy Mosley
- Producer: Timbaland

Ginuwine singles chronology
"What's So Different?" (1999)	"So Anxious" (1999)	"None of Ur Friends Business" (1999)

"So Anxious" is a song by R&B singer Ginuwine. It was written by Static Major, Digital Black, and Timbaland for his second studio album 100% Ginuwine (1999), while production was helmed by the latter. The song describes the narrator anxiously waiting on his lover all night to return his calls so that she can meet him for romance. Released as the album's third single, "So Anxious" became Ginuwine's second top 20 pop hit. It also reached number two on the US Hot R&B/Hip-Hop Songs chart. The music video was directed by Chris Robinson.

== Track listing ==
CD single
No.	Title	Writer(s)	Producer(s)	Length
1.	"So Anxious"	Stephen Garrett; Benjamin Bush; Timothy Mosley	Timbaland	4:37
2.	"Toe 2 Toe"	Elgin Lumpkin; Mosley	Timbaland	2:13
3.	"Medley" (What's So Different?"/"Final Warning"/"Wait a Minute"/"No. 1 Fan)			8:14

== Credits and personnel ==
Credits lifted from the liner notes of 100% Ginuwine.

- Benjamin "Digital Black" Bush – writer
- Jimmy Douglass – mixing engineer
- Stephen Garrett – writer
- Ginuwine – vocals
- Timbaland – mixing engineer, producer, writer

== Charts ==
=== Weekly charts ===
Chart (1999)	Peak position
US Billboard Hot 100	16
US Hot R&B/Hip-Hop Songs (Billboard)	2
US Rhythmic (Billboard)	6

=== Year-end charts ===
Chart (1999)	Position
US Billboard Hot 100	80
US Hot R&B/Hip-Hop Songs (Billboard)	24

== Certifications ==
Certifications for "So Anxious"
Region	Certification	Certified units/sales
New Zealand (RMNZ)	Gold	15,000^{‡}
^{‡} Sales+streaming figures based on certification alone.

== Cover versions ==
- Drake sampled "So Anxious" in the songs "Legend" and "Madonna" on his 2015 mixtape If You're Reading This It's Too Late.
- R&B singer August Alsina covered the song in March 2015, however it was not released as a single.
- The Sunday Service Choir, a gospel group led by Kanye West, interpolates "So Anxious" in the song "Soul's Anchored" on their 2019 debut album Jesus Is Born.
