= Holler (Ginuwine song) =

Single by Ginuwine

from the album Ginuwine... the Bachelor
- Released: December 2, 1997
- Length: 5:04
- Label: 550; Epic
- Songwriters: Elgin Lumpkin; Timothy Mosley; Lushone Siplin
- Producer: Timbaland

Ginuwine singles chronology
"Only When Ur Lonely" (1997)	"Holler" (1997)	"Same Ol' G" (1998)

"Holler" is a song by American R&B singer Ginuwine. It was co-written by Lushone "Nikki" Siplin and Timbaland and produced by the latter for his debut studio album Ginuwine... the Bachelor (1996). The song was released as the album's sixth and final single and became a UK top 15 hit.

== Track listing ==
CD single
No.	Title	Producer(s)	Length
1.	"Holler" (Album Version)	Timbaland	4:37
2.	"Holler" (Full Crew Phat Mix)	Timbaland; Full Crew^{[a]}	4:12
3.	"Holler" (Full Crew Smoove Mix)	Timbaland; Full Crew^{[a]}	4:20
4.	"Holler" (Strike Mix)	Timbaland; Strike^{[a]}	7:04

Notes

- ^{^a} denotes additional producer

== Charts ==
Chart (1998)	Peak position
Scotland (OCC)	59
UK Singles (OCC)	13
UK Hip Hop/R&B (OCC)	1

=== Year-end charts ===
Chart (1998)	Position
UK Urban (Music Week)	20
