= Same Ol' G =

1998 single by Ginuwine

Single by Ginuwine

from the album Dr. Dolittle and 100% Ginuwine
- Released: July 28, 1998
- Recorded: 1997
- Length: 4:22
- Label: Blackground; Atlantic
- Songwriters: Stephen Garrett; Jimmy Douglass; Timothy Mosley
- Producer: Timbaland

Ginuwine singles chronology
| "Holler" (1997) | "Same Ol' G" (1998) | "What's So Different?" (1999) |

"Same Ol' G" is a song by American R&B singer Ginuwine. It was written by Timbaland, Jimmy Douglass, and Static Major and recorded for the soundtrack of the American fantasy comedy film Dr. Dolittle (1998), with production helmed by the former. "Same Ol' G" describes Ginuwine having matured from his days of clubbing, drinking and thugging with friends as he now has his own album deal and appearing on television, but insists that he hasn't changed. Timbaland also contributed spoken adlibs throughout the song, primarily in between Ginuwine's sung verses.

Released as a single on July 28, 1998, it was later included on Ginuwine's second studio album 100% Ginuwine (1999), also serving as its lead single. While it did not chart officially on the Hot R&B Singles or the Hot 100 chart due to Billboard guidelines at the time, "Same Ol' G" was a top 20 R&B airplay hit on the strength of radio spins but charted on the lower reaches of the Hot 100 Airplay chart. A music video, directed by Dave Meyers, was also filmed.

== Track listings ==
CD single
| No. | Title | Writer(s) | Producer(s) | Length |
|---|---|---|---|---|
| 1. | "Same Ol' G" (Radio Edit) | Tim Mosley; Jimmy Douglass; Static Major | Timbaland | 4:01 |
| 2. | "Same Ol' G" (Steve Antony's R+B Mix – Final Mix) | Mosley; Douglass; Major | Timbaland; Steve Antony^{[a]} | 5:04 |
| 3. | "Same Ol' G" (Steve Antony's R+B Mix – Instrumental) | Mosley; Douglass; Major | Timbaland; Antony^{[a]} | 5:14 |

CD, maxi single
| No. | Title | Writer(s) | Producer(s) | Length |
|---|---|---|---|---|
| 1. | "Same Ol' G" (Radio Edit) | Mosley; Douglass; Major | Timbaland | 4:02 |
| 2. | "What's So Different?" | Thomas Boyce; Bobby Hart; Elgin Lumpkin; Mosley | Timbaland | 3:55 |

== Credits and personnel ==
Credits lifted from the liner notes of 100% Ginuwine.

- Jimmy Douglass – mixer, writer
- Ginuwine – vocals
- Static Major – writer
- Timbaland – mixer, producer, writer

== Charts ==
| Chart (1998) | Peak position |
|---|---|
| Netherlands (Dutch Top 40) with "What's So Different?" | 8 |
| Netherlands (Single Top 100) with "What's So Different?" | 9 |
| US Radio Songs (Billboard) | 67 |
| US R&B/Hip-Hop Airplay (Billboard) | 11 |
| US Rhythmic Airplay (Billboard) | 12 |
