= None of Ur Friends Business =

Single by Ginuwine

from the album 100% Ginuwine
- Released: October 23, 1999
- Length: 4:15; 6:05 (including interlude)
- Label: 550 Music; Epic
- Songwriters: Elgin Lumpkin; Timothy Mosley
- Producer: Timbaland

Ginuwine singles chronology
"So Anxious" (1999)	"None of Ur Friends Business" (1999)	"The Best Man I Can Be" (1999)

"None of Ur Friends Business" is a song by American R&B singer Ginuwine. It was co-written and produced by Timbaland and recorded for his second studio album 100% Ginuwine (1999). The song was released as the album's fourth and final single in October 1999 and peaked at number 48 on the US Billboard Hot 100.

== Credits and personnel ==
Credits lifted from the liner notes of 100% Ginuwine.

- Craig Brockman – strings
- Jimmy Douglass – mixing engineer
- Ginuwine – producer, writer
- Timbaland – mixing engineer, producer, writer

== Charts ==
=== Weekly charts ===
Chart (1999–2000)	Peak position
US Billboard Hot 100	48
US Hot R&B/Hip-Hop Songs (Billboard)	7

=== Year-end charts ===
Chart (2000)	Position
US Hot R&B/Hip-Hop Songs (Billboard)	54
