= What's So Different? =

Single by Ginuwine

from the album 100% Ginuwine
- Released: February 16, 1999
- Recorded: 1998
- Length: 4:00
- Label: 550 Music; Epic
- Songwriters: Thomas Boyce; Bobby Hart; Elgin Lumpkin; Tim Mosley
- Producer: Timbaland

Ginuwine singles chronology
| "Same Ol' G" (1998) | "What's So Different?" (1999) | "So Anxious" (1999) |

"What's So Different?" is a song by American R&B singer Ginuwine. It was co-written and produced by Timbaland for his second album 100% Ginuwine (1999). The song is built around a sample of "Valleri" (1968) by the American band The Monkees. Due to the inclusion of the sample, Thomas Boyce and Bobby Hart are also credited as songwriters. Released as the album's second single, "What's So Different?" reached the top ten of the UK Singles Chart and entered the top twenty in New Zealand. It the United States, the song peaked at number three on the Rhythmic chart, also reaching number 21 on the US Hot R&B/Hip-Hop Songs.

== Lyrical content and music video ==
"What's So Different" lyrically describes the narrator questioning his lover who is cheating on her boyfriend to be with him. He claims that if she is cheating on another man to be with him, she may also cheat on him to be with someone else. The music video was directed by Francis Lawrence. "What's So Different" samples the Monkees' 1968 hit "Valleri".

== Track listing ==
CD single
| No. | Title | Producer(s) | Length |
|---|---|---|---|
| 1. | "What's So Different?" (Album Version) | Timbaland | 4:00 |
| 2. | "What's So Different?" (Instrumental) | Timbaland | 4:00 |
| 3. | "What's So Different?" (Club Asylum Classic Vocal Mix) | Timbaland; Club Asylum^{[a]} | 6:12 |
| 4. | "What's So Different?" (C.A.P. Dub) | Timbaland; Jeremy Sylvester^{[a]}; Paul Emanuel^{[a]} | 5:34 |

Notes

- ^{^a} denotes additional producer

Sample credits

- "What's So Different?" contains an interpolation of "Valleri" (1968) as performed by The Monkees.

== Credits and personnel ==
Credits lifted from the liner notes of 100% Ginuwine.

- Thomas Boyce – writer (sample)
- Bobby Hart – writer (sample)
- Ginuwine – vocals, writer
- Timbaland – producer, writer

== Charts ==
=== Weekly charts ===
| Chart (1999) | Peak position |
|---|---|
| Germany (GfK) | 50 |
| Netherlands (Dutch Top 40) with "Same Ol' G" | 8 |
| Netherlands (Single Top 100) with "Same Ol' G" | 9 |
| New Zealand (Recorded Music NZ) | 16 |
| Scotland (OCC) | 52 |
| Switzerland (Schweizer Hitparade) | 43 |
| UK Singles (OCC) | 10 |
| UK Dance (OCC) | 2 |
| UK Hip Hop/R&B (OCC) | 3 |
| US Billboard Hot 100 | 49 |
| US Hot R&B/Hip-Hop Songs (Billboard) | 21 |
| US Rhythmic (Billboard) | 3 |

=== Year-end charts ===
| Chart (1999) | Position |
|---|---|
| US Hot R&B/Hip-Hop Songs (Billboard) | 82 |
