= Dr. Dolittle (1998 film) =

1998 film directed by Betty Thomas

- Theatrical release poster
- Directed by: Betty Thomas
- Screenplay by: Larry Levin; Nat Mauldin
- Based on: Doctor Dolittle by Hugh Lofting
- Produced by: John Davis; David T. Friendly; Joseph M. Singer
- Starring: Eddie Murphy; Ossie Davis; Oliver Platt
- Cinematography: Russell Boyd
- Edited by: Peter Teschner
- Music by: Richard Gibbs
- Production companies: Davis Entertainment; Joseph M. Singer Entertainment; Friendly Films; Fox Family Films
- Distributed by: 20th Century Fox
- Release date: June 26, 1998
- Running time: 85 minutes
- Country: United States
- Language: English
- Budget: $71.5 million
- Box office: $294.4 million

Dr. Dolittle is a 1998 American fantasy comedy film directed by Betty Thomas, written by Larry Levin and Nat Mauldin, and starring Eddie Murphy in the title role, along with Ossie Davis and Oliver Platt. The film is loosely based on the series of children's stories by Hugh Lofting.

Dr. Dolittle was released by 20th Century Fox on June 26, 1998. The film received mixed reviews from critics and was a box-office success, grossing $294.4 million against a $71.5 million budget.

The film's success generated a theatrical sequel, Dr. Dolittle 2 (2001), and three films released direct to video: Dr. Dolittle 3 (2006), Dr. Dolittle: Tail to the Chief (2008), and Dr. Dolittle: Million Dollar Mutts (2009).

== Plot ==
In 1968, five-year old John Dolittle displays an ability to hear what animals are saying, starting with his own dog. John asks his dog questions like: "Why do dogs sniff each other's butts?" and the dog's response is that it is their own way of shaking hands, and John does it when meeting his new principal Mr. Galvin. His behavior concerns his father Archer, who hires a local priest to perform an exorcism on John in order to remove the "devil" from him. During the exorcism, the dog bites and attacks the priest, resulting in Archer sending the dog away. Following this ordeal, John eventually stops talking to animals and soon forgets he can.

Thirty years later in 1998, John is a doctor and a surgeon living in San Francisco, California. He is happily married to his wife Lisa, and has two daughters, typical teenager Charisse, and nerdy Maya, who has a pet guinea pig named Rodney, and what she believes is a swan egg, which she hopes will bond with her upon hatching. A large medical company owned by Mr. Calloway seeks to buy John's practice, a deal which one of his colleagues, Dr. Mark Weller, is enthusiastic about, though their other colleague, Dr. Gene Reiss, is skeptical about the deal due to the potential of downsizing patients and staff.

John's family goes on vacation, while John goes back to work to see a patient, and then pick up Rodney. On his way home, he accidentally nearly hits a dog with his SUV, causing the dog to scold him in anger. Afterward, as John is driving to the cabin his family is staying at with Rodney in the car, Rodney starts talking to John, causing him to believe he is having a mental breakdown. John has a CT scan after animals start asking for favors when he helps a hurt owl, and he then unwittingly adopts the dog he nearly ran over, eventually naming him Lucky. John later starts secretly helping various animals, including a suicidal circus tiger named Jake, who suffers from vision problems and crippling headaches. Through all this, John begins learning to re-appreciate his gift, at one point confiding to both Lucky and Mark that he hasn't felt excited about his work in years. However, Lisa and Mark catch him performing CPR on a rat, and have him sent to a mental hospital.

Believing his gift is a hindrance, John rejects all abnormality in his life and returns to work, but in doing so, ostracizes Maya as well, who comes to believe he dislikes her. Maya admits to Archer that she liked the idea of her father talking to animals, and John has a change of heart when he eavesdrops on the conversation. He admits to Maya that he does not like, but loves her for who she is, and encourages her to continue being what she wants to be.

John then apologizes to Lucky, and together, they sneak Jake out of the circus and take him to the hospital to perform surgery on him, on the same night a party is going on where Calloway will buy the company. Mark and Gene catch John, but Gene tires of Mark's greedy attitude and decides to assist John. Soon, Jake, his symptoms worsening to the point of becoming gravely ill, is exposed in front of everyone at the party, and they all watch as John and Gene operate on Jake in the operating theater. Archer reveals to Lisa that John's gift is real, encouraging her to venture into the theater and keep Jake calm while John and Gene discover Jake is suffering from a blood clot in his great cerebral vein and successfully remove it, saving Jake's life. Calloway is impressed with John's efforts and offers to buy the place, though John declines Calloway's offer.

John becomes both a doctor and a veterinarian afterwards, embracing his ability to talk to animals. Maya's egg hatches into a baby alligator, and the final scene shows John and Lucky walking on the street together with John talking about how he's going to treat animals and people, and Lucky talking about how he wants different treatment from now on, while the owl is shown chasing after the rats.

== Cast ==
=== Live-action cast ===
- Eddie Murphy as Dr. John Dolittle, a physician who can talk to animals.
  - Dari Gerard Smith as 5-year-old John Dolittle
  - Raymond Matthew Mason as 3-year-old John Dolittle
- Ossie Davis as Archer Dolittle, the father of John.
- Oliver Platt as Dr. Mark Weller, a colleague and frenemy of John.
- Peter Boyle as Mr. Calloway, a man who seeks to buy John's practice.
- Richard Schiff as Dr. Gene Reiss, a colleague and loyal friend of John.
- Kristen Wilson as Lisa Dolittle, the wife of John.
- Jeffrey Tambor as Dr. Fish
- Kyla Pratt as Maya Dolittle, the nerdy daughter of John.
- Raven-Symoné as Charisse Dolittle, (Paprika) the teenage daughter of John.
- Steven Gilborn as Dr. Sam Litvack
- Erik Dellums as Jeremy
- Don Calfa as Hammersmith Patient
- Kellye Nakahara as Beagle Woman
- Beth Grant as Woman
- Richard Penn as Mr. Gavin
- John Lafayette as Reverend
- Paul Giamatti as Blaine Hammersmith (uncredited)
- Pruitt Taylor Vince as Hammersmith Patient (uncredited)

=== Voice cast ===
- Norm Macdonald as Lucky, a dog that John adopts.
- Albert Brooks as Jacob "Jake", a Bengal tiger.
- Chris Rock as Rodney, a guinea pig owned by the Dolittle family
- Reni Santoni as Rat #1
- John Leguizamo as Rat #2
- Julie Kavner as Female Pigeon
- Garry Shandling as Male Pigeon
- Ellen DeGeneres as Prologue Dog, John's childhood pet
- Brian Doyle-Murray as Old Retriever
- Phil Proctor as Drunk Monkey
- Jenna Elfman as Owl
- Gilbert Gottfried as Compulsive Dog
- Phyllis Katz as Goat
- Douglas Shamburger as Pound Dog
- Jeff Doucette as Possum
- Archie Hahn as Heavy Woman's Dog
- Tom Towles as German Shepherd
- Eddie Frierson as Skunk
- Paul Reubens as Raccoon
- Royce D. Applegate as "I Love You" Dog
- James F. Dean as Orangutan
- Chad Einbinder as Bettelheim the Cat
- Jonathan Lipnicki as Baby Tiger
- Hamilton Camp as Pig
- Kerrigan Mahan as Penguin

=== Puppeteers ===
Lead puppeteer

- Allan Trautman - lead puppeteer

Puppeteers

- Bill Barretta
- Kevin Carlson
- Bruce Lanoil
- Drew Massey
- Ian Tregonning
- Mak Wilson

== Soundtrack ==
Dr. Dolittle: The Album

Soundtrack album by various artists
- Released: June 16, 1998
- Recorded: 1997–98
- Genres: Hip hop, R&B
- Label: Atlantic
- Producers: Timbaland, Rodney Jerkins, The Legendary Traxster, Various

Singles from Dr. Dolittle
- 1. "Are You That Somebody?" Released: June 16, 1998; 2. "Same Ol' G" Released: July 28, 1998; 3. "That's Why I Lie" Released: September 22, 1998

The soundtrack was released on June 16, 1998, through Atlantic Records and consisted of a blend of hip-hop and contemporary R&B. The soundtrack was a huge success, peaking at 4 on both the Billboard 200 and the Top R&B/Hip-Hop Albums and was certified 2× Multi-Platinum on October 20 the same year. AllMusic rated the soundtrack four stars out of five.

The soundtrack's only charting single, "Are You That Somebody?" by Aaliyah, also found success, making it to 21 on the Billboard Hot 100 and received a nomination for Best Female R&B Vocal Performance at the 41st Annual Grammy Awards.

Information taken from Dr. Dolittle: The Album liner notes:

No.	Title	Writer(s)	Producer(s)	Length
1.	"That's Why I Lie" (Ray J)	Rodney Jerkins; Fred Jerkins III; LaShawn Daniels; Isaac Phillips; Tye-V Turman; Traci Hale	Rodney Jerkins	4:51
2.	"Let's Ride (Remix)" (Montell Jordan featuring Shaunta)	Montell Jordan; Teddy Bishop; Shaunta Montgomery	Teddy Bishop; Dutch (remix)	4:53
3.	"Are You That Somebody?" (Aaliyah)	Timothy Mosley; Stephen Garrett	Timbaland	4:27
4.	"Same Ol' G" (Ginuwine)	Mosley; Garrett	Timbaland	4:21
5.	"Lady Marmalade (Timbaland Remix)" (All Saints)	Bob Crewe; Kenny Nolan	Johnny Douglass; Neville Henry; Karen Gibbs; John Benson; Timbaland (remix)	4:03
6.	"Da Funk" (Timbaland)	Mosley	Timbaland	4:29
7.	"Do Little Things" (Changing Faces featuring Ivan Matias)	Andrea Martin; Ivan Matias	Ivan Matias; Andrea Martin	5:09
8.	"Your Dress" (Playa)	Mosley; Garrett; Benjamin Bush	Timbaland	3:59
9.	"Woof Woof" (69 Boyz)	Van Bryant	K Mills; Thrill Da Playa (co.)	4:11
10.	"Rock Steady" (Dawn Robinson)	Aretha Franklin	Jake and the Phatman	3:05
11.	"In Your World" (Twista and Speedknot Mobstaz)	Traxster; Twista; Mayze; Malif	The Legendary Traxster	4:50
12.	"Lovin' You So" (Jody Watley)	Tony Maiden; Chaka Khan; Dwayne Wiggins; Rahsaan Patterson	Dwayne Wiggins	3:35
13.	"Dance" (Robin S. featuring Mary Mary)	Warryn Campbell; Trecina Atkins; Erica Atkins; Ray Norwood Jr.; Mario Winans; Ronald Winans; Howard Smith	Warryn Campbell	3:38
14.	"Push 'Em Up" (Eddie Kane & DeVille featuring DJ Toomp)	Eddie Grier; Deodrick Veal; Warren Borders; Alan Borders; Aldrin Davis	DJ Toomp	3:46
15.	"Ain't Nothin' but a Party" (The Sugarhill Gang)	Sherwin Charles; James Carter; Travis Ray Lane; Ivan Norwood	Life Long Entertainment; I-Roc; Jammin' James Carter; Ivan Norwood	3:57

Sample credits

- "Lovin' You So" contains elements from "Pack'd My Bags", written by Chaka Khan and Tony Maiden.
- "Dance" contains "If Ever I Fall" by The Winans.
- "Ain't Nothin' but a Party" contains an interpolation of "8th Wonder", written by Sylvia Robinson, Clifton Chase, Michael Wright, Cheryl Cook, and Guy O'Brien.

=== Certifications ===
Region	Certification	Certified units/sales
United States (RIAA)	2× Platinum	2,000,000^{^}
^{^} Shipments figures based on certification alone.

== Reception ==
=== Box office ===
On its opening weekend, Dr. Dolittle earned $29,014,324 across 2,777 theaters in the United States and Canada, ranking #1 at the box office, the best debut for a 20th Century Fox film that week. It would go on to achieve the biggest opening weekend for an Eddie Murphy film, beating The Nutty Professor. That record would be surpassed by its successor Nutty Professor II: The Klumps in 2000. By the end of its run, the film had grossed $144,156,605 in the United States and $150,300,000 internationally, totaling $294,456,605 worldwide.

=== Critical reception ===
On Rotten Tomatoes, the film has an approval rating of 43% based on reviews from 53 critics, with an average rating of 5.2/10. The site's critics consensus reads, "Doctor Dolittle finds some mirth in the novelty of wisecracking critters, but this family feature's treacly tone is made queasy by a reliance on scatological gags that undercut the intended warmth". On Metacritic, it has weighted average score of 46 out of 100 based on reviews from 20 critics, indicating "mixed or average" reviews. Audiences surveyed by CinemaScore gave the film a grade "A−" on scale of A to F.

Leonard Klady of Variety called it "slim on story and rife with scatological jokes, the film may strike a chord with pre-teens but misses for an older crowd despite some nifty effects and broad humor". Kenneth Turan of the Los Angeles Times dismissed the film as "a complete waste of time and potential".

Nathan Rabin of The A.V. Club wrote: "Murphy is stuck playing second fiddle to the film's menagerie of nutty animals, he makes an engaging straight man. Dr. Dolittle isn't as sharp or consistent as Murphy's The Nutty Professor, but it's an amusing, lightweight diversion". Roger Ebert of the Chicago Sun-Times gave the film 3 out of 4 and wrote: "Too many adults have a tendency to confuse bad taste with evil influences; it's hard for them to see that the activities in Doctor Dolittle, while rude and vulgar, are not violent or anti-social. The movie will not harm anyone".

== Home media ==
Dr. Dolittle was released on LaserDisc and VHS on November 24, 1998, DVD on August 3, 1999, and Blu-ray disc on March 18, 2014, by 20th Century Fox Home Entertainment.

== Other media ==
=== Video game ===
A video game based on the film was released in Europe for the PlayStation 2 on November 29, 2006.
