= Jimmy Douglass =

American recording engineer and producer

- Also known as: The Senator
- Born: Philadelphia, Pennsylvania, U.S.
- Origin: New York City, New York, U.S.
- Occupations: Recording engineer; audio mixer; record producer
- Years active: 1970s–present
- Label: Atlantic Records
- Formerly of: Swing Mob
- Website: jimmydouglass.com

Jimmy Douglass, also known as "The Senator", is an American recording engineer and record producer. Active since 1970, he has been credited on singles and albums for fellow Virginia-based acts including Missy Elliott and Timbaland.

== Career ==
In the early 1970s at Atlantic Records studios in New York City, he started his studio career as a part-time tape duplicator while still attending high school. There he learned how to operate the studio's custom made 16-channel console and observed, was trained by, as well as worked with some of the greatest engineers, producers and record moguls including Tom Dowd, Arif Mardin, Jerry Wexler and Ahmet Ertegun. For his first time behind the faders, he was encouraged by Wexler to engineer the session recording for a demo of a new band. He went on to work with Atlantic Recording artists such as Aretha Franklin, Hall & Oates, Roberta Flack, Donny Hathaway, Foreigner, Led Zeppelin and AC/DC.

During the 1980s, Douglass continued to hone his engineering skills while also taking on the role as producer. He engineered and produced established artists including The Rolling Stones, Elkie Brooks, Slave, Odyssey, Roxy Music, Genesis and Gang of Four.

Douglass started the first half of the 1990s, working mainly on jingles and post-production. This style of work taught him the importance of working efficiently and capturing the vibe which would greatly benefit him in the years to come. In 1994, he began working with up and coming contemporary R&B/hip hop duo Timbaland & Magoo and served as their main engineer for more than a decade. They would eventually collaborate on classic projects from artists such as Aaliyah, Playa, Missy Elliott, Ginuwine and Jay-Z.

Beginning the new millennium, Douglass continued engineering and mixing more Timbaland produced projects including Snoop Dogg, Björk and Grammy winning albums for Justin Timberlake. Among the artists he also mixed are Rob Thomas, Sean Paul, John Legend & The Roots, Kanye West, Ludacris, Al Green, and Duran Duran.

Douglass lives in California.
