= Speed discography =

Discography of Japanese pop group Speed

- Studio albums: 5
- Live albums: 2
- Compilation albums: 5
- Singles: 20

This is a discography for Japanese pop group, Speed.

== Albums ==
=== Studio albums ===
Title	Album details	Peak chart positions	Sales (Note: Sales are based on certification levels only.)	Certifications
Title	Album details	JPN	Sales	Certifications
Starting Over	Released: May 21, 1997; Label: Toy's Factory	1	JPN: 2,000,000	RIAJ: 2 Million
Rise	Released: April 29, 1998; Label: Toy's Factory	1	JPN: 2,000,000	RIAJ: 2 Million
Carry On My Way	Released: December 22, 1999; Label: Toy's Factory	1	JPN: 1,200,000	RIAJ: 3× Platinum
Bridge	Released: November 27, 2003; Label: Avex Trax	9	JPN: 100,000	RIAJ: Gold
4 Colors	Released: November 14, 2012; Label: Sonic Groove	16		

=== Live albums ===
Title	Album details	Peak chart positions	Sales	Certifications
Title	Album details	JPN	Sales	Certifications
Speed Memorial Live "One More Dream" + Remix	Released: December 19, 2001; Label: Toy's Factory	7	JPN: 200,000	RIAJ: Gold
Best Hits Live: Save the Children Speed Live 2003	Released: February 11, 2004; Label: Sonic Groove	15		

=== Compilation albums ===
Title	Album details	Peak chart positions	Sales	Certifications
Title	Album details	JPN	Sales	Certifications
Moment	Released: December 16, 1998; Label: Toy's Factory	1	JPN: 2,000,000	RIAJ: 2 Million
Speed the Memorial Best 1335days Dear Friends 1	Released: March 29, 2000; Label: Toy's Factory	4	JPN: 400,000	RIAJ: Platinum
Speed the Memorial Best 1335days Dear Friends 2	Released: March 29, 2000; Label: Toy's Factory	3	JPN: 400,000	RIAJ: Platinum
Speedland: The Premium Best Re Tracks	Released: August 5, 2009; Label: Sonic Groove	2	JPN: 100,000	RIAJ: Gold
Speed Music Box - All the Memories -	Released: January 13, 2021; Label: Sonic Groove	13		

== Singles ==
Title	Year	Peak chart positions	Sales	Certifications	Album
Title	Year	JPN	Sales	Certifications	Album
"Body & Soul"	1996	4	JPN: 400,000	RIAJ: Platinum	Starting Over
"Steady"	1996	2	JPN: 1,200,000	RIAJ: 3× Platinum	Starting Over
"Go! Go! Heaven"	1997	1	JPN: 800,000	RIAJ: 2× Platinum	Starting Over
"Wake Me Up!"	1997	2	JPN: 400,000	RIAJ: Platinum	Rise
"White Love"	1997	1	JPN: 1,600,000	RIAJ: 4× Platinum	Rise
"My Graduation"	1998	1	JPN: 1,200,000	RIAJ: 3× Platinum	Rise
"Alive"	1998	1	JPN: 1,000,000	RIAJ: Million	Moment
"All My True Love"	1998	1	JPN: 1,200,000	RIAJ: 3× Platinum	Moment
"Precious Time"	1999	2	JPN: 1,000,000	RIAJ: Million	Carry On My Way
"Breakin' Out to the Morning"	1999	2	JPN: 400,000	RIAJ: Platinum	Carry On My Way
"Long Way Home"	1999	2	JPN: 400,000	RIAJ: Platinum	Carry On My Way
"One More Dream"	2001	5	JPN: 200,000	RIAJ: Gold	Non-album single
"Be My Love"	2003	2	JPN: 100,000	RIAJ: Gold	Bridge
"Walking in the Rain / Stars to Shine Again"	2003	13			Bridge
"Ashita no Sora" (あしたの空)	2008	3	JPN: 100,000	RIAJ: Gold	4 Colors
"S.P.D."	2009	8			4 Colors
"Himawari -Growing Sunflower-" (ヒマワリ -Growing Sunflower-)	2010	9			4 Colors
"Yubiwa" (指環)	2010	10			4 Colors
"Let's Heat Up!"	2010	15			4 Colors
"Little Dancer" (リトルダンサー)	2011	18			4 Colors
