= Heartbeat (compilation album) =

Compilation album by Various Artists
- Released: December 25, 2019
- Genre: Pop, J-Pop
- Language: Japanese
- Label: Sonic Groove; CD (AVCD-16969)

Heartbeat (ハートビート) is a compilation album released by the Sonic Groove record label. The album carries various songs by past and present artists who have been under Rising Production's various labels, including Da Pump, Lead, w-inds and Arisa Mizuki.

The album contains an alternate version of Da Pump's "U.S.A", which gained mass popularity in 2018, despite low expectations upon release.

The album garnered a Christmas release on December 25, 2019.

== Information ==
Heartbeat is a compilation album released by the Sonic Groove record label on December 25. 2019 to correspond with the Christmas holiday. The album features artists that are currently, or had been, under the Vision Factory label. These include Daichi Miura, Lead, w-inds, MAX and Folder5.

Along with original tracks, the album featured a few remixes that had been updated for a 2019 release. Those that were given a modernized remix were MAX's songs "Tora Tora Tora", "Give me a Shake", "Tacata'" and "Ride on time", and DA PUMP's song "U.S.A".

All of the songs on the album were rearranged and compiled to create a non-stop mix, beginning and ending with DA PUMP's "U.S.A".

== Track listing ==
CD
No.	Title	Original Artist(s)	Length
1.	"U.S.A"	DA PUMP
2.	"P.A.R.T.Y ~Universe Festival~"	DA PUMP
3.	"White Angel"	Fairies
4.	"Tora Tora Tora" (2019 Mix)	MAX
5.	"Dancing Hero (Eat You Up)"	Yōko Oginome
6.	"Gokigendaze! ~Nothing But Something~"	DA PUMP
7.	"Parachute"	Folder
8.	"Luv is Magic"	Eriko with Crunch
9.	"Go! Go! Heaven"	SPEED
10.	"Tacata'"	MAX
11.	"Blizzard"	Daichi Miura
12.	"Let's get it on"	w-inds
13.	"Bling Bling My Love"	Fairies
14.	"Stars"	ERIHIRO
15.	"happy wake up!"	Alisa Mizuki
16.	"Too Shy Shy Boy!"	Alisa Mizuki
17.	"Is This Love"	Earth
18.	"Body & Soul"	SPEED
19.	"Manatsu no Magic"	Lead
20.	"Hanabi" (花火 / Fireworks)	Fuwa Fuwa
21.	"Treasure"	hiro
22.	"Steady"	SPEED
23.	"As Time Goes By"	hiro
24.	"Wing"	Rina Chinen
25.	"White Love"	SPEED
26.	"Give me a Shake" (2019 Mix)	MAX
27.	"We can't stop the music"	DA PUMP
28.	"Hands Up!"	Kota Niisato
29.	"Roppungi Junjo-ha" (六本木純情派 / Roppungi Junjo School)	Kota Niisato
30.	"Love Is A Melody"	D&D
31.	"Believe"	Folder5
32.	"Virgin Blue 2010"	Lead
33.	"Excite"	Daichi Miura
34.	"Ride on time" (2019 Mix)	MAX
35.	"Long Road"	w-inds
36.	"U.S.A" (2019 Heartbeat Mix)	DA PUMP
