= List of artists under the Avex Group =

This is a list of artists currently or formerly signed under the Avex Group and its sub-labels in Japan and in other Asian countries. International artists that are listed here have their music distributed in Japan by Avex Group or its sub-labels.

== Symbols ==
- []
- ()
- **

== @ ==
- @onefive [Avex Trax] (official site) *Japan*

== A ==
- AAA [Avex Trax] (official site) *Japan*
- Acid Black Cherry [Motorod] (official site) *Japan*
- After School [Avex Trax] Official Website *Japan/Taiwan/Hong Kong*
- Aiba, Hiroki [Avex Trax] (official site) *Japan*
- Aikawa, Nanase [Avex Trax] (official site) *Japan*
- Amuro, Namie [Avex Trax] (official site) *Japan*
- alan [Avex Trax] (official site) *Japan/China/Taiwan*
- A-Lin [Avex Taiwan] (official site) *Taiwan*
- Ak'Sent [Avex International] (official site) *Japan*
- Arakaki, Hitoe [Avex Trax] member of Speed *Japan*
- Arrested Development [Avex International/Cutting Edge] (official site) *Japan*
- A.T.T. [Avex Trax] (official site) *Japan*
- Aural Vampire [Avex Trax] (official site) *Japan*

== B ==
- Back-On [Cutting Edge] (official site) *Japan*
- Ballistik Boyz from Exile Tribe (Rhythm Zone)
- Beverly
- Big Bang [YGEX] (official site) *Japan*
- Bis (between 2012 and 2014)
- Bish
- BoA [S.M. JAPAN/Avex Trax] (official site) *Japan*
- Boredoms [Commons] (official site) *Japan*
- Breaking Benjamin [Avex International] (official site) *Japan*
- Bridear
- Bridgit Mendler [Avex International] (official site) *Japan*
- Bright [Rhythm Zone] (official site) *Japan*
- Bryk, Dan [Cutting Edge] (official site) *Japan*
- Blackpink [YGEX]

== C ==
- Carly Rae Jepsen [Avex Taiwan]
- Cho Tokimeki Sendenbu [Avex Trax]
- Clazziquai [Avex Trax] *Japan*
- CREAM (Japanese group) [Avex Trax] (official site) *Japan*
- Cyrus, Miley (official site)

== D ==
- D (band) [Avex Trax] *Japan*
- D&D [Avex Trax] (official site) *Japan*
- DA PUMP [Avex Tune] (official site) *Japan*
- Day after tomorrow [Avex Trax] (official site) *Japan*
- Dead or Alive [Avex Trax] (official site) *Japan*
- Digby, Marié (official site)
- Do As Infinity [Avex Trax] (official site) *Japan*
- Dream [Avex Trax] (Dream (Japanese band))(official site) Japan*
- DJ OZMA [Avex Trax] (official site) *Japan*

== E ==
- Every Little Thing [Avex Trax] (official site) *Japan*
- EXILE [Rhythm Zone] (official site) *Japan*
- EXO [S.M. JAPAN/Avex Group] (official site) *Japan

== F ==
- Fairies [Sonic Groove] *Japan*
- FAKY (official site) *Japan*
- Fantastics from Exile Tribe (Rhythm Zone)
- Fantastic Plastic Machine [Cutting Edge] *Japan*
- FEMM (official site) *Japan*
- Folder 5 [Avex Tune] (official site) *Japan*
- Friedman, Marty [Avex Trax] (official site) *Japan*
- f(x) [S.M. JAPAN/Avex Trax] (official site) *Japan*

== G ==
- Gackt [Avex Trax] (official site) *Japan*
- Gatti, Alessandra Mirka [Avex Trax] *Italy*
- Generations from Exile Tribe (Rhythm Zone)
- Genic (Japanese Group) [Avex Trax] (official site) *Japan*
- Genki Rockets [ Q Entertainment/Avex Trax] (official site) *Japan*
- Girls' Generation [S.M. JAPAN/Nayutawave Records/Rhythm Zone/Avex Taiwan *Taiwan*]
- Girl Next Door [Avex Trax] (official site) *Japan*
- globe [ Universal Music Group/Avex Globe] *Japan*
- Goto, Maki [Avex Trax] (official site) *Japan*

== H ==
- Hamasaki, Ayumi [Avex Trax] (official site) *Japan*
- Hinoi, Asuka [Sonic Groove] (official site) *Japan*
- Hinoi Team [Sonic Groove] (official site) *Japan*
- hiro [Avex Trax] member of Speed (official site) *Japan*
- hitomi [Love Life Records] (official site) *Japan*
- Hsu, Beatrice [Avex Taiwan] (Official Site) *Taiwan*
- Hsu, Vivian [Avex Taiwan] (official site) *Taiwan*
- HY [HIGASHIYAKENA SOUNDBUILDER/Avex Trax] *Japan*

== I ==
- i.n.g [Avex Taiwan] *Taiwan*
- Iconiq [Rhythm Zone] (official site) *Japan*
- Imai, Eriko [Avex Trax] member of Speed ("Elly" official site) *Japan*
- iKON [YGEX] (official site) *Japan*
- INTERSECTION [Avex Trax] *Japan*
- i☆Ris
- Isabel, Maria (official site)

== J ==
- J (of Luna Sea) [Blowgrow] (official site) *Japan*
- Janne Da Arc [Motorod] (official site) *Japan*
- J-Min [S.M. JAPAN/Avex Trax] *Japan (official site)
- Johnsson, Ana [Avex International] (official site) *Japan*
- Jonas Brothers [Avex International] (official site) *Japan*
- JUNO [Rhythm Zone/Avex Trax](official site) *Japan*
- Jurian Beat Crisis (official site) *Japan*

== K ==
- Kajiwara, Gakuto (Avex Pictures)
- Kamiki, Aya (moved from GIZA Studio)(official site)
- kannivalism (official site)
- Katy Perry [Avex International]
- Kayō, Aiko
- Kato, Kazuki (moved to Pony Canyon and moved to Avex Trax again) (official site)
- Keiko (moved to Universal Music Group)
- Kei Nangon [Avex International]
- Kitano, Kii
- Kim Hyung Jun
- Kosaka, Riyu
- Koda, Kumi (official site)
- Komuro, Tetsuya
- Kishidan
- Kiyoharu (official site)
- Kogure, Demon [Avex Trax] (official site) *Japan*
- K ONE
- Kawamura, Ryuichi (official site)
- Kis-my-ft2 (official site) *Japan*
- Kim Ji-won Avex Entertainment
- Kolme
- Kuroyume

== L ==
- Lia
- Lights Over Paris
- Lin, Ariel [Avex Taiwan] (official site) *Taiwan*
- Lin, Shino [Avex Taiwan] (official site) *Taiwan*
- Lindberg (official site)
- LinQ
- Lisa (official site)
- Lol (Japanese group) (official site)
- Lovato, Demi [Avex International] (official site) *Japan*
- Luna Sea (official site)
- Lynn, Cheryl
- Lau, Andy

== M ==
- Mai (official site)
- MAY (official site)
- May J. (official site)
- MAX (official site)
- Makihara, Noriyuki (official site)
- Matsushita, Moeko (official site)
- McFly (official site)
- McLean, AJ [Avex International] (official site) *Japan*
- M-Flo (official site)
- mini [Cutting Edge/Avex Trax] (official site)
- mink (official site)
- Misono (official site)
- Missile Innovation (official site)
- Miura, Daichi [Avex Trax] (official site)*Japan*
- Michi/michimemoir [Avex Entertainment] (official site)*Japan*
- Monkey Majik (official site)
- moumoon (official site)
- M.O.V.E (official site)
- Myra (official site)

== N ==
- Nagasawa, Nao (official site)
- Nakamura, Ataru (official site)
- 'N Sync
- Nightmare (official site)
- NCT

== O ==
- Okada, Nana (official site)
- Okumura, Hatsune (official site)
- Oblivion Dust (official site)
- Olivia (official site)
- Ono, Lisa (official site)
- O-Zone (official site) *Moldova*
- Osawa, Shinichi (official site)
- Otsuka, Ai (official site)
- One Or Eight (group) (official site)

== P ==
- Penicillin (band) [Blowgrow] (official site), as well as their independent vanity label THAT RECORDS *Japan*
- Peng, Eddie () *Taiwan*
- Lucas Prata
- Prizmmy (official site)
  - Prism Mates
- The Prodigy (1992-1997; Asia, under licence from XL Recordings)
- PSY [YG Japan/YGEX/Avex Trax] (official site) (official Facebook)

== R ==
- Ravex (official site)
- Red Velvet (group)
- Remioromen
- Rider Chips (official site)
- Rin' (official site)
- Rodgers, Dave (born Giancarlo Pasquini) [Avex Trax] *Italy*
- Run Girls, Run! (official site) [DIVE II entertainment]

== S ==
- Sads (band)
- Sakamoto, Ryuichi
- Sawajiri, Erika
- Seikima-II (official site)
- Selena Gomez [Avex International] (official site)
- S.E.S. [S.M. JAPAN/Avex Trax](disbanded)
- S.H.E
- Shimatani, Hitomi (official site)
- Shin (singer) [Avex Taiwan] (official site)
- Show Lo (official site)
- SKE48
- SHINee ([S.M. JAPAN/EMI Music Japan/Rhythm Zone])
- SM Town
- Shirota Yu [Avex Trax] (official site)
- Sifow (official site)
- Sophia (Japanese band)
- Soulhead (moved from onenation)
- Sowelu (official site)
- Speed
- Sugarcult (official site)
- Sunday [S.M. JAPAN/Avex Trax](official site) *Japan
- Super Junior [S.M. JAPAN/Rhythm Zone/Avex Trax](official site)
- SUPER☆GiRLS (official site)
- Suzuki, Ami (official site)
- SweetS (official site)
- Sweetbox (official site)
- Ferry Corsten (System F)

== T ==
- Tang, Danson [Avex Taiwan] (official site) *Taiwan*
- TREASURE (YGEX)
- TRF (official site)
- Tackey & Tsubasa (official site)
- Tacoyaki Rainbow [Avex Trax, since 2016]
- Takano Akira
- Tamaki, Hiroshi (official site)
- Tanimura, Nana (official site)
- Tank (HIM International Music/Avex Asia)
- Tara Priya (official site)
- Tenjochiki [S.M. JAPAN/Rhythm Zone](official site)
- Tetra-Fang
- The Boom (official site)
- The Rampage from Exile Tribe (Rhythm Zone)
- Jennifer Thomas (pianist) (official site)
- Tohoshinki [S.M. JAPAN/Rhythm Zone/Avex Trax](official site)
- Toki, Asako [Rhythm Zone] *Japan*
- TOKYO GIRLS' STYLE (official site)
- Tokyo Ska Paradise Orchestra (official site)
- tomboy (official site)
- TraxX [S.M. JAPAN/Avex Trax] (official site)
- Tse, Kay [Avex Asia] *Hong Kong*
- Tsuchiya, Anna (official site)
- The World Standard (Wa-suta) [Avex Trax] (official site)
- Takayanagi, Akane (SKE48) [Avex Entertainment]

== U ==
- Uehara, Takako [Avex Trax] member of Speed (official site) *Japan*
- U-KISS (official site)

== V ==
- V6 (official site)
- Van, Tomiko vocalist of Do As Infinity (official site)
- Vanilla Mood
- Zhao, Vicki

== W ==
- Wang, Cyndi [Avex Taiwan] (official site) *Taiwan*
- WARPs UP
- WINNER [YGEX] (official site) *Japan*
- Wong He
- Wu Bai & China Blue
- Wagakki Band (official site) *Japan*

== X ==
- X21
- XG [XGALX]

== Y ==
- Yamin, Elliott (official site)
- Yazima Beauty Salon (official site)
- Yaen
- YMCK
- Yasuharu Takanashi (Fairy Tail Original Soundtrack 5)
- Yoshida, Takuro (official site)

== Z ==
- Zelda (disbanded 1996)
- Liyin, Zhang [S.M. China/Avex Taiwan] (official site)
- ZZ (official site)
- Zebrahead
