= List of best-selling girl group albums =

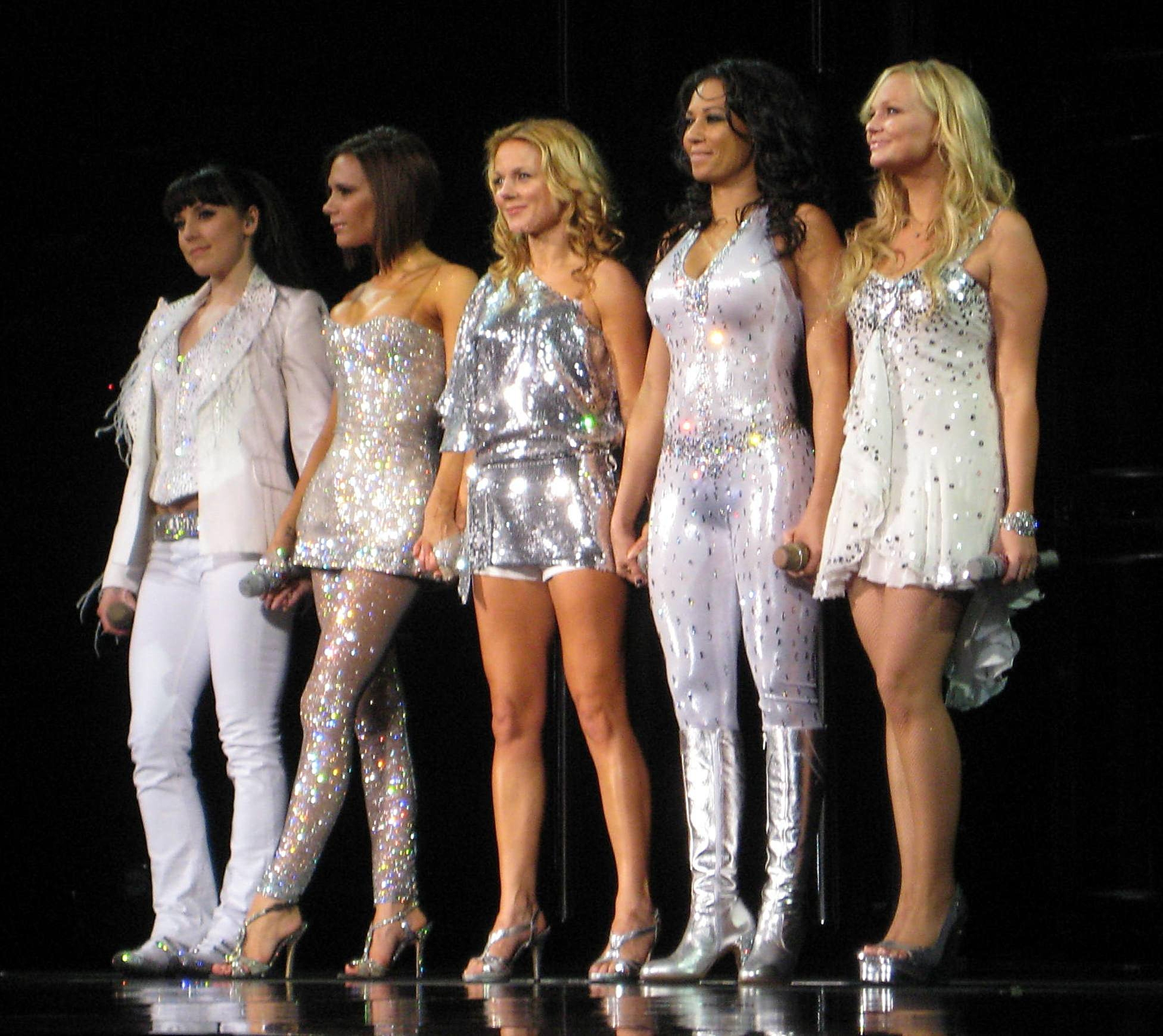
The Spice Girls (here in 2008) are the best-selling girl group in history.

A girl group is a popular music act featuring several female singers who generally harmonize together. Girl groups have been popular at least since the heyday of the Boswell Sisters beginning in the 1930s, but the term "girl group" also denotes the wave of American female pop singing groups who flourished in the late 1950s and early 1960s between the decline of early rock and roll and the British Invasion, many of whom were influenced by doo-wop style. This article covers only girl groups from that era and later. The term "girl group" also includes Japanese and Korean idol groups. In Japan, these groups began to gain popularity in the late 1990s, while in South Korea, they gained popularity in the 2000s and early 2010s. Korean girl groups make up a significant factor in the Korean Wave.

Sales figures records in most countries are not available before the 1990s, so it is difficult to accurately determine best-selling records, either by country or worldwide. Certification levels have been used for most countries, but certification was not common until the 1970s in the US and UK, and later in other countries. In addition, in many countries certification is for shipments of a record to retailers, rather than actual sales. Changes from 2010 onwards as certifications have become based on combined sales figures and streaming instead of sales alone have complicated matters further.

As a result, these tables should not be considered finalized of the best-selling records by girl groups in each country.

== Best-selling girl group albums ==
=== Worldwide ===
| Album | Released | Artist | Sales |
|---|---|---|---|
| Spice | 1996 | Spice Girls | 23 million |
| CrazySexyCool | 1994 | TLC | 15 million |
| Spiceworld | 1997 | Spice Girls | 14 million |
| The Writing's on the Wall | 1999 | Destiny's Child | 13 million |
| FanMail | 1999 | TLC | 10 million |
| Survivor | 2001 | Destiny's Child | 10 million |
| PCD | 2005 | Pussycat Dolls | 9 million |
| Wilson Phillips | 1990 | Wilson Phillips | 8 million |
| Very Necessary | 1993 | Salt-N-Pepa | 7 million |
| Destiny Fulfilled | 2004 | Destiny's Child | 7 million |
| Ooooooohhh... On the TLC Tip | 1992 | TLC | 6 million |
| Funky Divas | 1992 | En Vogue | 5 million |
| All Saints | 1997 | All Saints | 5 million |
| Always & Forever | 1994 | Eternal | 4 million |
| Forever | 2000 | Spice Girls | 4 million |
| Born Pink | 2022 | Blackpink | 3 million |
| Power of a Woman | 1995 | Eternal | 2 million |
| Rouge | 2002 | Rouge | 2 million |

=== Australia ===
Albums certified platinum or more by ARIA. Only includes certifications since 1990.

| Released | Album | Group | Certification | Sales (Based on certifications) |
|---|---|---|---|---|
| 1996 | Spice | Spice Girls | 6× Platinum | 420,000 |
| 1997 | Spiceworld | Spice Girls | 6× Platinum | 420,000 |
| 2005 | The Secret Life of... | The Veronicas | 4× Platinum | 280,000 |
| 1999 | The Writing's on the Wall | Destiny's Child | 3× Platinum | 210,000 |
| 2005 | PCD | The Pussycat Dolls | 3× Platinum | 210,000 |
| 1994 | CrazySexyCool | TLC | 2× Platinum | 140,000 |
| 1998 | B*Witched | B*Witched | 2× Platinum | 140,000 |
| 1998 | All Saints | All Saints | 2× Platinum | 140,000 |
| 2000 | Bardot | Bardot | 2× Platinum | 140,000 |
| 2001 | Survivor | Destiny's Child | 2× Platinum | 140,000 |
| 2006 | Young Divas | Young Divas | 2× Platinum | 140,000 |
| 2007 | Hook Me Up | The Veronicas | 2× Platinum | 140,000 |
| 1988 | The Greatest Hits Collection | Bananarama | Platinum | 70,000 |
| 1999 | FanMail | TLC | Platinum | 70,000 |
| 2002 | Feels So Good | Atomic Kitten | Platinum | 70,000 |
| 2004 | Destiny Fulfilled | Destiny's Child | Platinum | 70,000 |
| 2005 | #1's | Destiny's Child | Platinum | 70,000 |
| 2007 | Greatest Hits | Spice Girls | Platinum | 70,000 |
| 2008 | Doll Domination | Pussycat Dolls | Platinum | 70,000 |
| 2021 | Between Us | Little Mix | Platinum | 70,000 |

=== Brazil ===
Based on certifications awarded by Pro-Música Brasil. Certifications have only been awarded since 1990, so there is no sales information before this date. Some of the certification thresholds have changed over time.

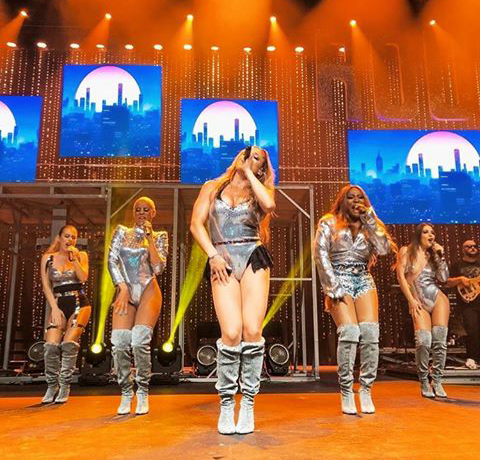
Rouge were Brazilian's biggest girl group and have the best selling album by a girl group of all time there.

| Released | Album | Group | Certification | Sales (Based on certifications) |
|---|---|---|---|---|
| 1996 | Spice | Spice Girls | 2× Platinum | 500,000 |
| 2002 | Rouge | Rouge | 2× Platinum | 500,000 |
| 1997 | Spiceworld | Spice Girls | Platinum | 250,000 |
| 2003 | C'est La Vie | Rouge | Platinum | 250,000 |
| 2016 | 7/27 | Fifth Harmony | 3× Platinum | 120,000 |
| 2000 | Forever | Spice Girls | Gold | 100,000 |
| 2004 | Blá Blá Blá | Rouge | Gold | 100,000 |
| 2001 | Survivor | Destiny's Child | Gold | 50,000 |
| 2015 | Get Weird | Little Mix | Platinum | 40,000 |
| 2016 | Glory Days | Little Mix | Platinum | 40,000 |
| 2018 | LM5 | Little Mix | Platinum | 40,000 |
| 2007 | Greatest Hits | Spice Girls | Gold | 30,000 |
| 2013 | Salute | Little Mix | Gold | 20,000 |
| 2015 | Reflection | Fifth Harmony | Gold | 20,000 |
| 2020 | Confetti | Little Mix | Gold | 20,000 |

=== Canada ===
Certifications according to Music Canada.

| Released | Album | Group | Certification | Sales (Based on certifications) |
|---|---|---|---|---|
| 1996 | Spice | Spice Girls | Diamond | 1,000,000 |
| 1997 | Spiceworld | Spice Girls | Diamond | 1,000,000 |
| 1994 | CrazySexyCool | TLC | 8× Platinum | 800,000 |
| 1990 | Wilson Phillips | Wilson Phillips | 7× Platinum | 700,000 |
| 1999 | The Writing's on the Wall | Destiny's Child | 5× Platinum | 500,000 |
| 1983 | Break Out | The Pointer Sisters | 4× Platinum | 400,000 |
| 1993 | Very Necessary | Salt-N-Pepa | 4× Platinum | 400,000 |
| 1999 | FanMail | TLC | 4× Platinum | 400,000 |
| 2001 | Survivor | Destiny's Child | 4× Platinum | 400,000 |
| 1997 | All Saints | All Saints | 3× Platinum | 300,000 |
| 1992 | Shadows and Light | Wilson Phillips | 2× Platinum | 200,000 |
| 1998 | Destiny's Child | Destiny's Child | 2× Platinum | 200,000 |
| 2000 | Forever | Spice Girls | 2× Platinum | 200,000 |
| 2002 | 200 km/h in the Wrong Lane | t.A.T.u | 2× Platinum | 200,000 |
| 1986 | True Confessions | Bananarama | Platinum | 100,000 |
| 1992 | Ooooooohhh... On the TLC Tip | TLC | Platinum | 100,000 |
| 1992 | Funky Divas | En Vogue | Platinum | 100,000 |
| 1998 | B*Witched | B*Witched | Platinum | 100,000 |
| 2004 | Destiny Fulfilled | Destiny's Child | Platinum | 100,000 |
| 2005 | #1's | Destiny's Child | Platinum | 100,000 |
| 2016 | 7/27 | Fifth Harmony | Platinum | 80,000 |

=== Europe ===
Albums certified platinum or more for more than one million sales in Europe, according to the International Federation of the Phonographic Industry.

Note: the IFPI Europe Platinum Award was only created in 1996, therefore there are few albums on this list from before that date. No awards are publicly available after 2014.

| Released | Album | Group | Certification | Sales (Based on certifications) |
|---|---|---|---|---|
| 1996 | Spice | Spice Girls | 8× Platinum | 8,000,000 |
| 1997 | Spiceworld | Spice Girls | 5× Platinum | 5,000,000 |
| 1997 | All Saints | All Saints | 2× Platinum | 2,000,000 |
| 1999 | The Writing's on the Wall | Destiny's Child | 2× Platinum | 2,000,000 |
| 2001 | Survivor | Destiny's Child | 2× Platinum | 2,000,000 |
| 2005 | PCD | The Pussycat Dolls | 2× Platinum | 2,000,000 |
| 1994 | CrazySexyCool | TLC | Platinum | 1,000,000 |
| 1996 | Tic Tac Toe | Tic Tac Toe | Platinum | 1,000,000 |
| 1997 | Klappe die 2te | Tic Tac Toe | Platinum | 1,000,000 |
| 1997 | Greatest Hits | Eternal | Platinum | 1,000,000 |
| 1998 | B*Witched | B*Witched | Platinum | 1,000,000 |
| 1999 | FanMail | TLC | Platinum | 1,000,000 |
| 2000 | Saints & Sinners | All Saints | Platinum | 1,000,000 |
| 2001 | Elle'ments | No Angels | Platinum | 1,000,000 |
| 2001 | 200 Po Vstrechnoy | t.A.T.u. | Platinum | 1,000,000 |
| 2002 | 200 km/h in the Wrong Lane | t.A.T.u. | Platinum | 1,000,000 |
| 2002 | Angels with Dirty Faces | Sugababes | Platinum | 1,000,000 |
| 2002 | Feels So Good | Atomic Kitten | Platinum | 1,000,000 |
| 2002 | Hijas del Tomate | Las Ketchup | Platinum | 1,000,000 |
| 2003 | Three | Sugababes | Platinum | 1,000,000 |
| 2004 | Destiny Fulfilled | Destiny's Child | Platinum | 1,000,000 |
| 2005 | Taller in More Ways | Sugababes | Platinum | 1,000,000 |
| 2006 | The Sound of Girls Aloud: The Greatest Hits | Girls Aloud | Platinum | 1,000,000 |

=== France ===
Certifications according to SNEP. Some of the certification thresholds have changed over time.

| Released | Album | Artist | Certification | Sales (Based on certifications) |
|---|---|---|---|---|
| 1996 | Spice | Spice Girls | Diamond | 1,000,000 |
| 1997 | Spiceworld | Spice Girls | 2× Platinum | 600,000 |
| 2001 | L5 | L5 | 2× Platinum | 600,000 |
| 1993 | Native | Native | Platinum | 300,000 |
| 1988 | The Greatest Hits Collection | Bananarama | 2× Gold | 200,000 |
| 2000 | The Writing's on the Wall | Destiny's Child | 2× Gold | 200,000 |
| 2001 | Survivor | Destiny's Child | 2× Gold | 200,000 |
| 2015 | En attendant l'album... | L.E.J. | 2× Platinum | 200,000 |
| 1997 | Colors of Love | Native | Gold | 100,000 |
| 1999 | FanMail | TLC | Gold | 100,000 |
| 2002 | Hijas del Tomate | Las Ketchup | Gold | 100,000 |
| 2002 | 200 km/h in the Wrong Lane | t.A.T.u. | Gold | 100,000 |
| 2000 | Forever | Spice Girls | Gold | 100,000 |
| 2005 | PCD | The Pussycat Dolls | Gold | 75,000 |
| 2008 | Doll Domination | The Pussycat Dolls | Gold | 75,000 |
| 2020 | The Album | Blackpink | Gold | 50,000 |
| 2022 | Born Pink | Blackpink | Gold | 50,000 |

=== Germany ===
Certifications according to the BVMI.

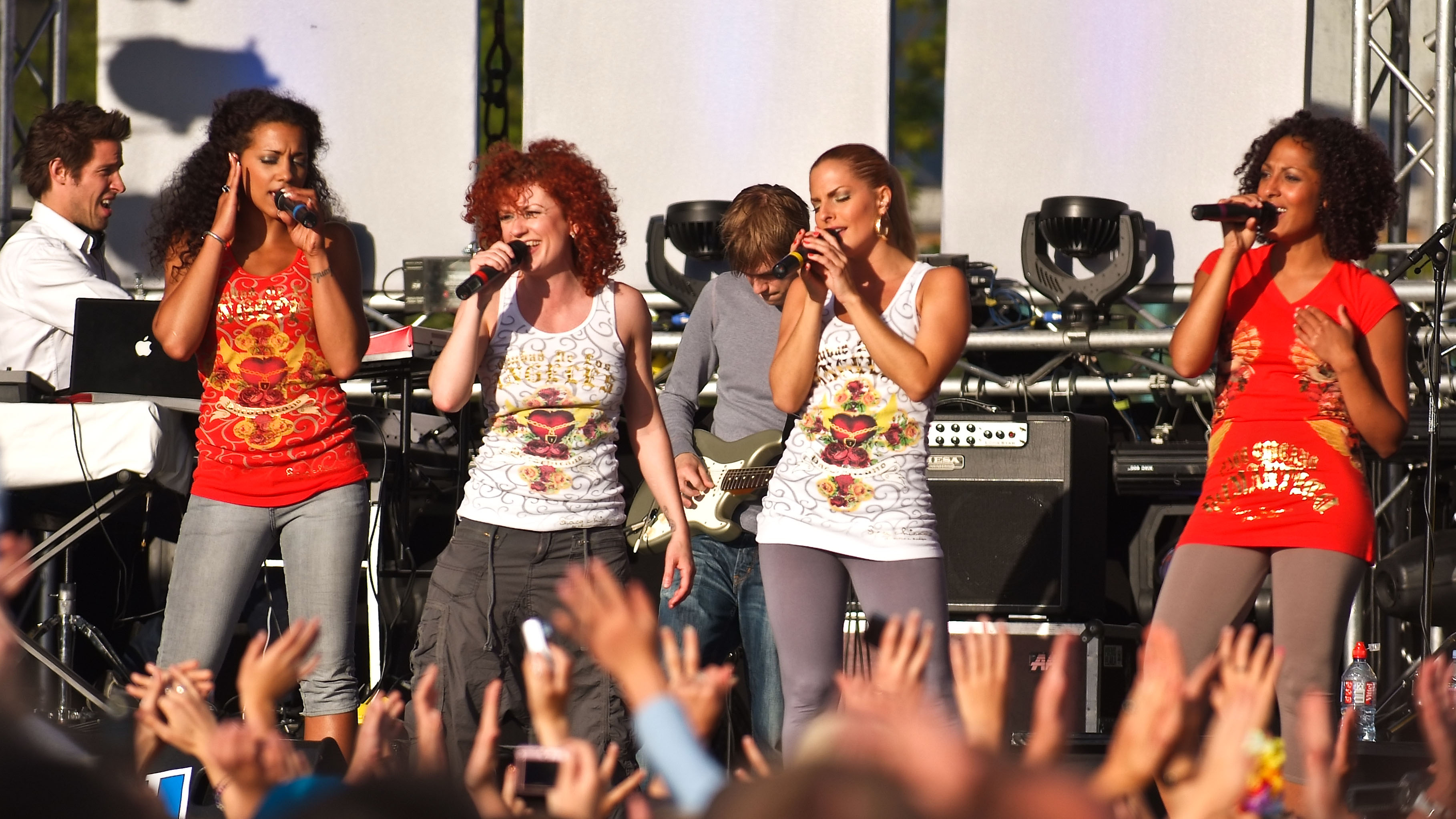
No Angels were Germany's biggest girl group and have the best selling album by a girl group of all time there.

| Released | Album | Artist | Certification | Sales (Based on certifications) |
|---|---|---|---|---|
| 2001 | Elle'ments | No Angels | 7× Gold | 1,050,000 |
| 1996 | Spice | Spice Girls | 3× Gold | 750,000 |
| 2002 | Now... Us! | No Angels | 2× Platinum | 600,000 |
| 1997 | Spiceworld | Spice Girls | Platinum | 500,000 |
| 2006 | Temptation | Monrose | 2× Platinum | 400,000 |
| 2001 | Survivor | Destiny's Child | Platinum | 300,000 |
| 1999 | The Writing's on the Wall | Destiny's Child | Gold | 250,000 |
| 2004 | Destiny Fulfilled | Destiny's Child | Platinum | 200,000 |
| 2005 | PCD | Pussycat Dolls | Platinum | 200,000 |
| 2000 | Forever | Spice Girls | Gold | 150,000 |
| 2001 | Right Now | Atomic Kitten | Gold | 150,000 |
| 2002 | Feels So Good | Atomic Kitten | Gold | 150,000 |
| 2002 | 200 km/h in the Wrong Lane | t.A.T.u. | Gold | 150,000 |
| 2003 | Pure | No Angels | Gold | 100,000 |
| 2003 | Three | Sugababes | Gold | 100,000 |
| 2005 | Taller in More Ways | Sugababes | Gold | 100,000 |
| 2008 | Doll Domination | Pussycat Dolls | Gold | 100,000 |

=== Japan ===
Sales according to Oricon and Platinum certifications according to the RIAJ. The ten biggest-selling girl group albums in Japan:

| Released | Album | Group | Sales | Certification |
|---|---|---|---|---|
| 1998 | Moment | Speed | 2,319,000 | Million |
| 2001 | Best! Morning Musume 1 | Morning Musume | 2,260,000 | Million |
| 1998 | Rise | Speed | 2,048,000 | Million |
| 2002 | 200 km/h in the Wrong Lane | t.A.T.u. | 2,000,000 | Million |
| 1996 | Starting Over | Speed | 1,926,000 | Million |
| 1996 | Maximum | MAX | 1,288,260 | 3× Platinum |
| 1999 | Carry On My Way | Speed | 1,200,000 | 3× Platinum |
| 1997 | Maximum II | MAX | 1,074,530 | 3× Platinum |
| 2012 | 1830m | AKB48 | 1,042,879 | Million |
| 2014 | Tsugi no Ashiato | AKB48 | 1,041,951 | Million |

=== Netherlands ===
Certifications according to the NVPI.

| Released | Album | Group | Certification | Sales (Based on certifications) |
|---|---|---|---|---|
| 1996 | Spice | Spice Girls | 3× Platinum | 300,000 |
| 1999 | The Writing's on the Wall | Destiny's Child | 2× Platinum | 200,000 |
| 2000 | Alle kleuren | K3 | 2× Platinum | 160,000 |
| 2001 | Survivor | Destiny's Child | 2× Platinum | 160,000 |
| 2001 | Tele-Romeo | K3 | 2× Platinum | 160,000 |
| 2002 | Verliefd | K3 | 2× Platinum | 160,000 |
| 1978 | With Luv' | Luv' | Platinum | 100,000 |
| 1979 | Lots of Luv' | Luv' | Platinum | 100,000 |
| 1978 | Energy | The Pointer Sisters | Platinum | 100,000 |
| 1997 | Spiceworld | Spice Girls | Platinum | 100,000 |
| 1999 | FanMail | TLC | Platinum | 100,000 |
| 2000 | Parels 2000 | K3 | Platinum | 100,000 |
| 2009 | MaMaSé! | K3 | Platinum | 50,000 |
| 2011 | Eyo! | K3 | Platinum | 50,000 |
| 2012 | Engeltjes | K3 | Platinum | 50,000 |
| 1979 | True Luv' | Luv' | Gold | 50,000 |
| 1993 | Always & Forever | Eternal | Gold | 50,000 |
| 1994 | CrazySexyCool | TLC | Gold | 50,000 |
| 1996 | Before the Rain | Eternal | Gold | 50,000 |
| 1997 | Greatest Hits | Eternal | Gold | 50,000 |
| 1998 | All Saints | All Saints | Gold | 50,000 |
| 2000 | Forever | Spice Girls | Gold | 40,000 |
| 2002 | Feels So Good | Atomic Kitten | Gold | 40,000 |
| 2002 | Angels with Dirty Faces | Sugababes | Gold | 40,000 |
| 2005 | Kuma hé | K3 | Gold | 40,000 |

=== New Zealand ===
| Released | Album | Artist | Certification |
|---|---|---|---|
| 1996 | Spice | Spice Girls | 7× Platinum |
| 2005 | PCD | Pussycat Dolls | 4× Platinum |
| 1997 | Spiceworld | Spice Girls | 3× Platinum |
| 1999 | The Writing's on the Wall | Destiny's Child | 3× Platinum |
| 1998 | B*Witched | B*Witched | 2× Platinum |
| 2001 | Survivor | Destiny's Child | 2× Platinum |
| 2005 | #1's | Destiny's Child | 2× Platinum |
| 1977 | 20 Golden Greats | Diana Ross & the Supremes | Platinum |
| 1994 | CrazySexyCool | TLC | Platinum |
| 1997 | Greatest Hits | Eternal | Platinum |
| 1997 | All Saints | All Saints | Platinum |
| 1999 | FanMail | TLC | Platinum |
| 2001 | Right Now | Atomic Kitten | Platinum |
| 2002 | Feels So Good | Atomic Kitten | Platinum |
| 2003 | The No. 1s | Diana Ross & the Supremes | Platinum |
| 2004 | Destiny Fulfilled | Destiny's Child | Platinum |
| 2008 | Doll Domination | Pussycat Dolls | Platinum |
| 2015 | Get Weird | Little Mix | Platinum |
| 2017 | Glory Days | Little Mix | Platinum |
| 2021 | Between Us | Little Mix | Platinum |
| 2015 | Reflection | Fifth Harmony | Platinum |

=== South Korea ===
Sales of albums released after 2010 are according to the Circle Album Chart published monthly and yearly with detailed album sales by the Korea Music Content Association (KMCA). Sales of albums released before 2010 are based on data collected by Music Industry Association of Korea (from 1999 to 2007) or claimed sales based on reliable sources. The 15 biggest-selling girl group albums in South Korea:

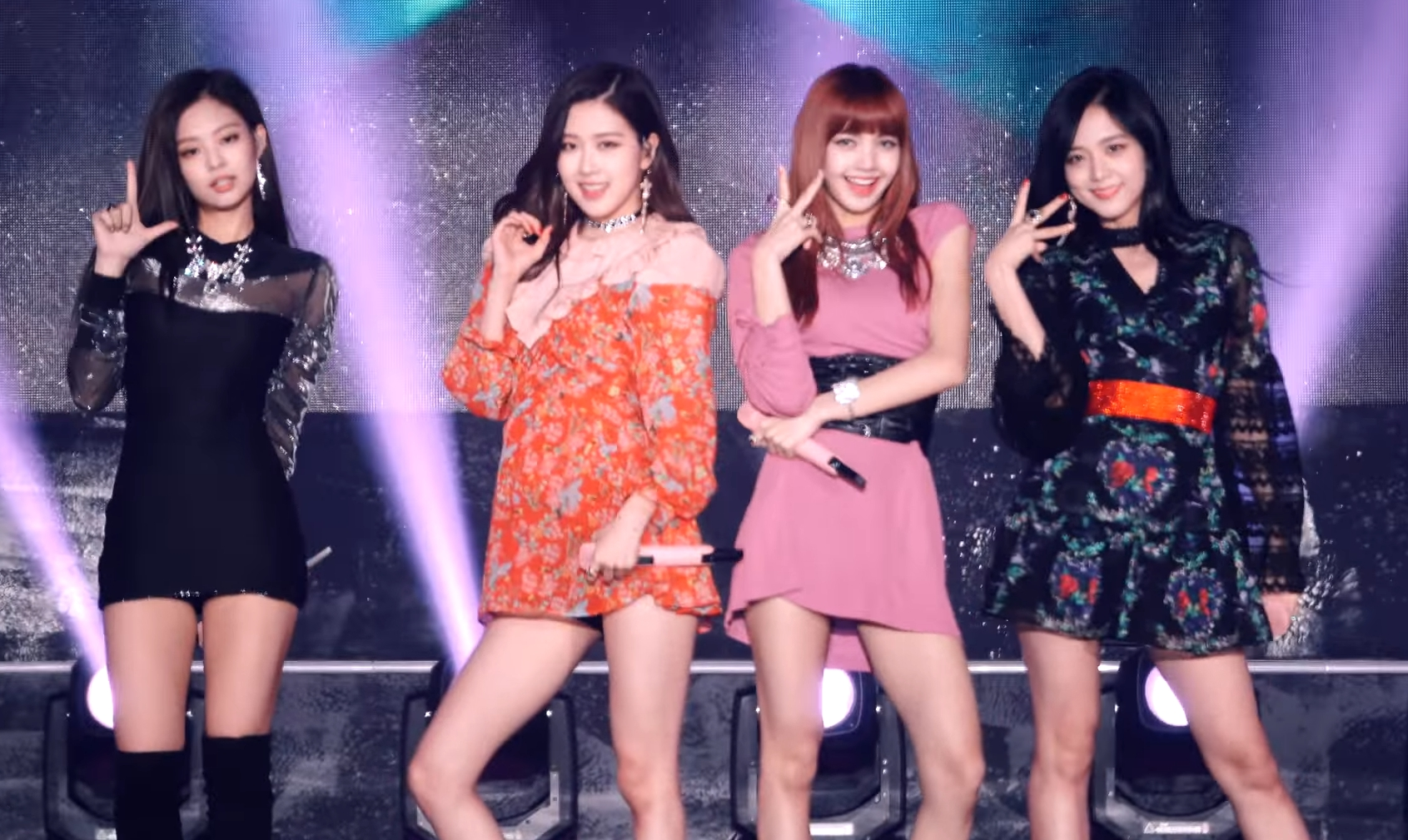
Blackpink's The Album (2020) and Born Pink (2022) each broke the record for the best-selling girl group album of all time in South Korea.

| Released | Album | Group | Sales |
|---|---|---|---|
| 2022 | Born Pink | Blackpink | 3,079,832 |
| 2023 | Get Up | NewJeans | 2,338,423 |
| 2023 | My World | Aespa | 2,191,887 |
| 2023 | I've Mine | Ive | 2,118,689 |
| 2026 | Deadline | Blackpink | 1,988,245 |
| 2023 | OMG | NewJeans | 1,849,265 |
| 2022 | Girls | Aespa | 1,830,073 |
| 2022 | New Jeans | NewJeans | 1,826,839 |
| 2020 | The Album | Blackpink | 1,812,684 |
| 2022 | After Like | Ive | 1,781,624 |
| 2024 | Ive Switch | Ive | 1,754,036 |
| 2023 | I've Ive | Ive | 1,736,130 |
| 2024 | 2 | I-dle | 1,700,757 |
| 2023 | Ready to Be | Twice | 1,674,143 |
| 2023 | Unforgiven | Le Sserafim | 1,571,548 |

=== Switzerland ===
Certifications according to the IFPI.

| Album | Group | Sales (Based on certifications) | Certification | Year |
|---|---|---|---|---|
| Spice | Spice Girls | 100,000 | 2× Platinum | 1996 |
| Spiceworld | Spice Girls | 100,000 | 2× Platinum | 1997 |
| Forever | Spice Girls | 50,000 | Platinum | 2000 |
| All Saints | All Saints | 50,000 | Platinum | 1997 |
| Elle'ments | No Angels | 40,000 | Platinum | 2001 |
| Survivor | Destiny's Child | 40,000 | Platinum | 2001 |
| 200 km/h in the Wrong Lane | t.A.T.u. | 40,000 | Platinum | 2002 |
| Temptation | Monrose | 30,000 | Platinum | 2006 |
| Between Us | Little Mix | 20,000 | Platinum | 2021 |
| The Greatest Hits Collection | Bananarama | 25,000 | Gold | 1988 |
| Wilson Phillips | Wilson Phillips | 25,000 | Gold | 1990 |
| Shadows and Light | Wilson Phillips | 25,000 | Gold | 1992 |
| FanMail | TLC | 25,000 | Gold | 1999 |
| The Writing's on the Wall | Destiny's Child | 25,000 | Gold | 1999 |
| Right Now | Atomic Kitten | 25,000 | Gold | 2001 |
| Feels So Good | Atomic Kitten | 20,000 | Gold | 2002 |
| Angels With Dirty Faces | Sugababes | 20,000 | Gold | 2002 |
| Now... Us! | No Angels | 20,000 | Gold | 2002 |
| Hijas del Tomate | Las Ketchup | 20,000 | Gold | 2002 |
| Three | Sugababes | 20,000 | Gold | 2003 |
| Destiny Fulfilled | Destiny's Child | 20,000 | Gold | 2004 |
| Taller in More Ways | Sugababes | 20,000 | Gold | 2005 |
| PCD | Pussycat Dolls | 20,000 | Gold | 2005 |
| Doll Domination | Pussycat Dolls | 15,000 | Gold | 2008 |
| Glory Days | Little Mix | 10,000 | Gold | 2016 |

=== Taiwan ===
| Released | Album | Group | Sales |
|---|---|---|---|
| 2003 | Super Star | S.H.E | 300,000+ |
| 2002 | Genesis | S.H.E | 300,000+ |
| 2003 | Together | S.H.E | 280,000 |
| 2002 | Youth Society | S.H.E | 280,000+ |
| 2004 | Magical Journey | S.H.E | 280,000 |
| 1997 | Spice | Spice Girls | 200,000 |
| 2004 | Encore | S.H.E. | 180,000 |

=== United Kingdom ===
Albums certified triple platinum (900,000 units) or more by the BPI. Diana Ross & the Supremes: 20 Golden Greats (1977) sold 1 million units and achieved double platinum status for sales worth more than $4 million, but was certified Platinum with the previous thresholds, based on monetary revenue: Platinum (£1,000,000), Gold (£300,000 from 1977 until 1979) and Silver (£150,000 from 1977 until 1979).

| Released | Album | Artist | Certification | Known sales |
|---|---|---|---|---|
| 1996 | Spice | Spice Girls | 10× Platinum | 2,980,000 |
| 1997 | Spiceworld | Spice Girls | 5× Platinum | 1,600,000 |
| 1997 | All Saints | All Saints | 5× Platinum | 1,470,000 |
| 1993 | Always & Forever | Eternal | 4× Platinum | 1,400,000 |
| 2005 | PCD | Pussycat Dolls | 4× Platinum | 1,300,000 |
| 2016 | Glory Days | Little Mix | 4× Platinum | 1,300,000 |
| 2006 | The Sound of Girls Aloud: The Greatest Hits | Girls Aloud | 4× Platinum | 1,200,000 |
| 2001 | Survivor | Destiny's Child | 3× Platinum | 1,130,983 |
| 1999 | The Writing's on the Wall | Destiny's Child | 3× Platinum | 1,120,878 |
| 2015 | Get Weird | Little Mix | 3× Platinum | 950,000 |
| 1997 | Greatest Hits | Eternal | 3× Platinum | |
| 1988 | Greatest Hits Collection | Bananarama | 3× Platinum | |
| 2002 | Angels With Dirty Faces | Sugababes | 3× Platinum | |
| 2002 | Feels So Good | Atomic Kitten | 3× Platinum | |
| 2005 | Taller in More Ways | Sugababes | 3× Platinum | |
| 1977 | 20 Golden Greats | Diana Ross & the Supremes | 2× Platinum | 1,000,000 |

=== United States ===
Albums certified triple platinum or more by the RIAA. The sales figures shown for the quadruple and triple platinum albums are sales recorded by Nielsen SoundScan plus known sales from BMG's Music Club. These do not represent the total sales of the album in the US as they exclude unknown sales figures from Columbia House and other music clubs.

| Released | Album | Group | Certification | Known sales |
|---|---|---|---|---|
| 1994 | CrazySexyCool | TLC | 12× Platinum | 11,200,000 |
| 1999 | The Writing's on the Wall | Destiny's Child | 8× Platinum | 8,400,000 |
| 1996 | Spice | Spice Girls | 7× Platinum | 7,500,000 |
| 1999 | FanMail | TLC | 6× Platinum | 4,700,000 |
| 1990 | Wilson Phillips | Wilson Phillips | 5× Platinum | |
| 1993 | Very Necessary | Salt-N-Pepa | 5× Platinum | 4,400,000 |
| 2001 | Survivor | Destiny's Child | 4× Platinum | 4,739,000 |
| 1997 | Spiceworld | Spice Girls | 4× Platinum | 4,200,000 |
| 1992 | Ooooooohhh... On the TLC Tip | TLC | 4× Platinum | 2,500,000 |
| 2005 | PCD | Pussycat Dolls | 4× Platinum | |
| 1983 | Break Out | The Pointer Sisters | 3× Platinum | |
| 1992 | Funky Divas | En Vogue | 3× Platinum | 4,416,000 (Note: As of October 1997, Funky Divas had sold 3,500,000 copies in the United States according to Nielsen SoundScan, which does not count albums sold through clubs like the BMG Music Club, where it sold 916,000 copies. Combined, it has sold over 4,416,000 copies in the US.) |
| 1992 | It's About Time | SWV | 3× Platinum | |
| 2004 | Destiny Fulfilled | Destiny's Child | 3× Platinum | 3,100,000 |

== See also ==
- List of best-selling girl groups
- List of best-selling music artists
- List of best-selling singles
- List of best-selling albums
- List of girl groups
