= Rising Production =

Japanese talent agency

- Company type: Private
- Industry: Entertainment
- Genre: Talent agency
- Founded: July 1985; Minato, Tokyo
- Founder: Tetsuo Taira
- Headquarters: Aoyama, Tokyo, Japan
- Area served: Japan
- Number of employees: 31
- Website: www.rising-pro.jp

RISNGPRO Holdings Co. Ltd. (株式会社ライジングプロ・ホールディングス, Kabushiki gaisha Raijingupuro Hōrudingusu), operating as Rising Production, is a Japanese talent agency. It largely works with musical talent, but has branched out in recent years to include actors and comedians. The company came into prominence after the widespread successes of musical acts Namie Amuro, MAX, Speed and Da Pump in the mid to late 1990s.

== History ==
Rising Production was founded by Tetsuo Taira (平 哲夫, Taira Tetsuo) in Minato, Tokyo in July 1985, with Japanese idol Yōko Oginome being the agency's first talent. Oginome's success led to Taira becoming a producer under the pseudonym "Jonny Taira" (ジョニー平, Jonī Taira). In the fall of 1986, 12-year-old Kaori Sakagami signed with Rising Production after being invited to an Oginome concert in Nagasaki Prefecture. In 1991, the agency signed up-and-coming talent Alisa Mizuki.

In 1992, Rising Production formed a partnership with the Okinawa Actors School, which debuted the music group Super Monkey's that year. Super Monkey's would later evolve into two separate acts: Namie Amuro and MAX. Speed, Da Pump, Rina Chinen, Daichi Miura, and Folder 5 were also products of the partnership.

In 2001, Taira was arrested for tax evasion. During this time, Rising Production changed its name to Freegate Promotion (フリーゲートプロモーション, Furīgēto Puromōshon) on September 1. A year later during Taira's trial, the company renamed itself to Vision Factory (ヴィジョンファクトリー, Vijon Fakutorī). Taira served a 30-month prison sentence before returning to the company. In 2003, the agency ended its partnership with the Okinawa Actors School.

In the fall of 2006, Vision Factory opened the website Vision Cast and the record label Rising Records.

On December 11, 2014, the agency announced it would revert to its original name Rising Production.

Rising Production has hosted several charity events to help victims of disasters such as the Great East Japan earthquake in 2011, Typhoon Haiyan in the Philippines in 2013, and the 2016 Kumamoto earthquakes.

== Representative list of notable present and past clients ==
=== Music ===
==== Solo ====
- Akina
- Namie Amuro
- Asuka
- Rina Chinen
- Yumiko Fukuhara
- Kenichi Fujikawa
- Amika Hattan
- Asuka Hinoi
- Hitoe
- Eriko Imai
- Issa
- Ryoko Kuninaka
- Daichi Miura
- Alisa Mizuki
- Nobutoshi Nakamura
- Mariya Nishiuchi
- Yōko Oginome
- Olivia
- Kaori Sakagami
- Hiroko Shimabukuro
- Keita Tachibana
- Airi Taira
- Nana Tanimura
- Takako Uehara

==== Bands and groups ====
- Ai-Sachi
- AN-J
- Asian2
- Aya & Chika from D&D
- D-Loop
- D&D
- Da Pump
- Earth
- Fairies
- Flame
- Folder
- Folder 5
- Fuwafuwa
- Hinoi Team
- Hipp's
- Lead
- MAX
- Nakanomori Band
- Ota Crew
- Rockamenco
- Speed
- Tourbillon
- Vanilla Mood
- W-inds
- Zero

=== Others ===
- Nao Asahi (Former Idoling!!!)
- Manami Higa (actress)
- Yukari Taki (actress)
