= Andromedia =

- Directed by: Takashi Miike
- Screenplay by: Kurio Kisargi; Masa Nakamura; Itaru Era
- Based on: title of the original work by Hirotake Watanabe
- Produced by: Takashi Hirano; Toshiaki Nakazawa; Makoto Nakanishi; Kazuya Hamana Yasuhiro Mase
- Starring: Speed; Da Pump; Kenji Harada; Tsunehiko Watase; Naoto Takenaka
- Cinematography: Hideo Yamamoto
- Edited by: Yasushi Shimamura
- Music by: Koji Endo
- Production companies: TBS; Toy's Factory; Sedic International; Avex Group; Excellent Film
- Distributed by: Shochiku
- Release date: July 11, 1998 (Japan)
- Running time: 110 minutes
- Country: Japan
- Languages: Japanese; English

Andromedia (アンドロメディア) is a 1998 Japanese film directed by Takashi Miike. The film features the Japanese musical groups Speed and Da Pump.

== Plot ==
High school students Mainosuke "Mai" Hitomi and Yuu kiss for the first time. Later that same day Mai is hit by a truck and killed. Her scientist father, Toshihiko Hitomi, uses a scan of her memories created before her death to construct an AI copy of her, named "Ai". Soccer, the CEO of the American tech company Digital Ware, wishes to awaken his own AI and sends an agent to shoot Toshihiko and steal his software, but Toshihiko sends Ai through the modem to safety before dying. Ai finds Yuu through a school computer terminal nicknamed "Icon" that has been enhanced by Satoshi Takanaka, Mai's genius half-brother with a terminal brain disease. Yuu transfers Ai to his laptop, through which she interacts with him and Mai's old friends, including Rika, who is jealous of Yuu's love for Ai. Soccer sends Satoshi and others to chase down Yuu and capture Ai.

== Cast ==
- Hiroko Shimabukuro as Mai & Ai
- Eriko Imai as Yoko
- Takako Uehara as Rika
- Hitoe Arakaki as Nao
- Kenji Harada as Yuu
- Ryô Karato as Satoshi Takanaka
- Christopher Doyle as Sakkaa/Soccer
- Tomorowo Taguchi as Gôda
- Issa Hentona as Tooru
- Shinobu Miyara as Hiroyuki
- Yukinari Tamaki as Kazuma
- Ken Okumoto as Daiki
- Anna Ide as Mai as a child
- Akihiro Yoshikawa as Yuu as a child
- Kazuki Kitamura as Sada
- Michelle Gazepis as Sakkaa's/Soccer's secretary
- Hiromi Suzuki as Mai's mother
- Naoto Takenaka as Kurosawa
- Tsunehiko Watase as Toshihiko Hitomi/Mai's father/Ai's creator

== Release ==
Andromedia was distributed theatrically in Japan by Shochiku on July 11, 1998. The film was released on DVD and VHS in Japan by Toy's Factory and in the United States by Pathfinder Pictures.

== Reception ==
Tom Mes, author of Agitator: The Cinema of Takashi Miike, described Andromedia as the "most unabashedly commercial film" Miike had made at this point in his career.
