= List of Oricon number-one singles of 1997 =

The following is a list of Oricon number-one singles of 1997.

== Oricon Weekly Singles Chart ==
Issue date	Song	Artist(s)	Ref.
January 6	"Pride"	Miki Imai	
January 13	"You Are The One"	TK presents Konet	
January 20	"Don't you see!"	Zard	
January 27	"Face"	Globe	
February 3	"Ai nanda"	V6	
February 10	"Scarlet"	Spitz	
February 17	"Everything (It's You)"	Mr. Children	
February 24	"Everything (It's You)"	Mr. Children	
March 3	"Can You Celebrate?"	Namie Amuro	
March 10	"Can You Celebrate?"	Namie Amuro	
March 17	"Fireball"	B'z	
March 24	"Circuit no musume"	Puffy	
March 31	"Circuit no musume"	Puffy	
April 7	"Go! Go! Heaven"	Speed	
April 14	"Honki ga ippai"	V6	
April 21	"Give me a shake"	MAX	
April 28	"Nagisa ni matsuwaru Et Cetera"	Puffy	
May 5	"Hate tell a lie"	Tomomi Kahara	
May 12	"Hate tell a lie"	Tomomi Kahara	
May 19	"Hate tell a lie"	Tomomi Kahara	
May 26	"Kuchibiru"	Glay	
June 2	"How to be a girl"	Namie Amuro	
June 9	"How to be a girl"	Namie Amuro	
June 16	"For the moment"	Every Little Thing	
June 23	"Escape"	Moon Child	
June 30	"For the moment"	Every Little Thing	
July 7	"Daisuki!"	Ryōko Hirose	
July 14	"Love is all Music"	Tomomi Kahara	
July 21	"Calling"	B'z	
July 28	"Garasu no Shōnen"	KinKi Kids	
August 4	"Garasu no Shōnen"	KinKi Kids	
August 11	"Garasu no Shōnen"	KinKi Kids	
August 18	"However"	Glay	
August 25	"However"	Glay	
September 1	"Eien"	Zard	
September 8	"However"	Glay	
September 15	"However"	Glay	
September 22	"However"	Glay	
September 29	"Tanoshiku tanoshiku yasashiku ne"	Tomomi Kahara	
October 6	"Candle in the Wind '97"	Elton John	
October 13	"Candle in the Wind '97"	Elton John	
October 20	"Liar! Liar!"	B'z	
October 27	"White Love"	Speed	
November 3	"White Breath"	TM Revolution	
November 10	"White Love"	Speed	
November 17	"Generation Gap"	V6	
November 24	"Aisareru yori Aishitai"	KinKi Kids	
December 1	"Aisareru yori Aishitai"	KinKi Kids	
December 8	"Dreaming I was dreaming"	Namie Amuro	
December 15	"White Silent Night"	Shazna	
December 22	"Aisareru yori Aishitai"	KinKi Kids	
December 29	"Aisareru yori Aishitai"	KinKi Kids	
