= Coco d'Or =

Jazz band

- Genre: Jazz
- Members: Hiroko Shimabukuro
- Website: avexnet.or.jp/coco/

Coco d'Or is a jazz band, fronted by Hiroko Shimabukuro. Hiroko, also known as hiro or Abigail, is a member of the popular Okinawan group Speed.

Coco d'Or's debut self-titled album was released on 4 August 2004. A companion album entitled Coco d'Or Parfait, which contained the same songs along with three new songs, was released four months later. There is also a CD/DVD version that includes promotional videos and making of spots. Their second album was released on July 26, 2006. The title is Coco d'Or 2. An only CD version as well as a CD/DVD version with two music videos was available. A third album was released in March 2011.

Coco d'Or songs are modern remakes of popular classic jazz songs, such as "Misty" by Ella Fitzgerald and "Fly Me To The Moon" by Frank Sinatra.

== Discography ==
Release date	Title
4 August 2004	Coco d'Or
30 September 2004	Coco d'Or (Analog)
1 January 2005	Coco d'Or Parfait
27 July 2006	Coco d'Or 2
9 March 2011	Coco d'Or 3

Coco d'Or Parfait is a re-release of Coco d'Or, and was released on January 1, 2005. It includes all the songs from Coco d'Or, plus three new tracks, "Misty", "Lullaby Of Birdland", and "Doralice", as well as a DVD containing the video clips of "Fly Me To The Moon" and "Orange Colored Sky".

After a 5-year break, hiro released her third Coco d'Or album in March 2011. It was arranged by Dave Matthews and came in a CD-only version as well as a version containing a DVD.
