= List of best-selling singles in 1997 (Japan) =

This is a list of the best-selling singles in 1997 in Japan, as reported by Oricon.

Ranking	Single	Artist	Release	Sales
1	"Can You Celebrate?"	Namie Amuro	February 19, 1997	2,223,000
2	"Garasu no Shōnen"	KinKi Kids	July 21, 1997	1,686,000
3	"Hidamari No Uta"	Le Couple	May 16, 1997	1,461,000
4	"Face"	Globe	January 15, 1997	1,323,000
5	"Steady"	Speed	November 18, 1996	1,279,000
6	"Pride"	Miki Imai	November 4, 1997	1,260,000
7	"You Are The One"	TK presents Konet	January 1, 1997	1,225,000
8	"Everything (It's You)"	Mr. Children	February 5, 1997	1,217,000
9	"However"	Glay	August 6, 1997	1,183,000
10	"White Love"	Speed	October 15, 1997	1,165,000
11	"Shiroi kumo no yō ni"	Saruganseki	December 21, 1996	1,131,000
12	"Red Angel"	Pocket Biscuits	January 22, 1997	1,098,000
13	"A Walk in the Park"	Namie Amuro	November 27, 1996	1,066,000
14	"Hate tell a lie"	Tomomi Kahara	April 23, 1997	1,058,000
15	"Glass"	Ryuichi Kawamura	April 23, 1997	1,011,000
16	"Calling"	B'z	July 9, 1997	1,000,000
17	"Kuchibiru"	Glay	May 14, 1997	991,000
