= Carry On My Way =

Studio album by Speed
- Released: December 22, 1999
- Genre: J-pop
- Label: Toy's Factory

Speed chronology
Moment (1998)	Carry On My Way (1999)	Speed the Memorial Best 1335days Dear Friends 1 (2000)

Singles from Carry On My Way
- 1. "Precious Time" Released: 17 February 1999; 2. "Breakin' Out to the Morning" Released: 19 May 1999; 3. "Long Way Home" Released: 03 November 1999

Carry On My Way is Japanese J-pop girlband Speed's third album following their first two, Starting Over, and Rise. The record was released on December 22, 1999 and marked the band's final album until 2003's Bridge. It contains hit singles such as "Precious Time", "Breakin' Out to the Morning" and "Long Way Home". Carry On My Way sold 1.5 million copies and successfully hit the top position of the Oricon chart in the first week of 2000.

== Track listing ==
1. "Carry On My Way"
2. "Aoi Regret (蒼いリグレット, aoi riguretto)" — (Blue Regret)
3. "Long Way Home (Album Edit)"
4. "Deep Blue & Truth"
5. "Luv Blanket"
6. "Breakin' Out to the Morning"
7. "Snow Kiss"
8. "You Are the Moonlight"
9. "Lookin' for Love"
10. "Precious Time"
11. "Two of Us"
12. "Eternity"
13. "Confusion"
14. "Don't Be Afraid"

== Charts ==
Chart (1999)	Peak position
Japanese Albums (Oricon)	1

== Certifications ==
Certifications for Carry On My Way
Region	Certification	Certified units/sales
Japan (RIAJ)	3× Platinum	600,000^{^}
^{^} Shipments figures based on certification alone.
