= Utakata =

Utakata may refer to:

- Uta Kata, a 2004 anime television series
- Utakata (EP), an EP by Chara
- "Utakata" (song), by Pink Lady, 1980
- "Utakata", song by Speed, B-side to "S.P.D.", 2009
