= U.S.A. (Da Pump song) =

Single by Da Pump
- Released: June 6, 2018
- Recorded: 2018
- Genre: J-pop; Eurobeat
- Length: 3:58
- Label: Sonic Groove
- Songwriters: Cirelli Donatella; Lombardoni
- Producer: m.c.A.T

Da Pump singles chronology
"New Position" (2014)	"U.S.A." (2018)	"Sakura" (2019)

Alternate cover

Music video
- "U.S.A." on YouTube

"U.S.A." is a song by Japanese boy band Da Pump. It is a cover of a 1992 song with the same name by Gino Caria, under the alias of Joe Yellow. The song was released on June 6, 2018.

"U.S.A." is Da Pump's first single in three and a half years after the release of "New Position" in 2014. Initially Da Pump and their management had low expectations for their comeback, as their promotion events only took place at shopping malls. However, it soon became a summer hit, peaking high on various Japanese music charts.

== Music video ==
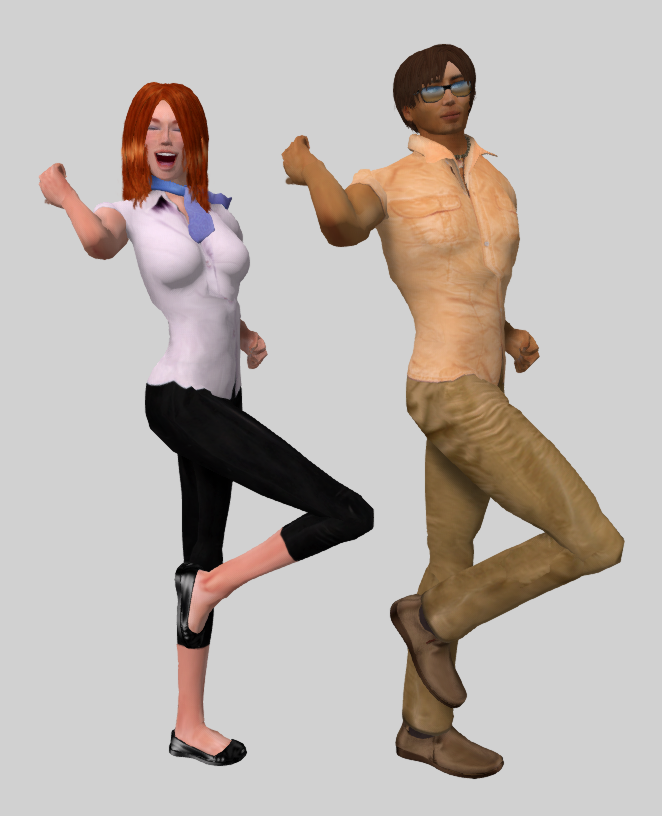
The Shoot (known as the "I like it" dance in Japan) is a prominent dance move during the chorus

The music video features the members of Da Pump dancing in a dark room lit up in colorful lights. The choreography includes dance moves such as the dab, the Milly Rock, and the Shoot (known as the "I like it" dance (いいねダンス, Ii ne dansu)). A video featuring the choreography was released on June 12, 2018.

== Release and reception ==
Initial public reaction ridiculed the song and music video due to Da Pump's age, dancing, and the outdated Eurobeat trend. Patrick St. Michel of The Japan Times likened the reaction to "watching your dad wax nostalgic and try to become a hypebeast at the same time". However, the song soon grew in popularity and became a summer hit for drawing sentimental value to the 1990s, especially among Hello! Project fans who were nostalgic for their early music style. The song was described as "tacky but cool" by the media. The music video gained 1 million views on its first week of release. By July 2018, the song had been downloaded more than 22,790 times.

The song inspired a trend called the "U.S.A. game", where people would sing, "C'mon, baby, America" (a line from the chorus) followed by a factual statement about the United States while keeping in rhythm. The success of "U.S.A." led Okayama Prefecture to creating an advertisement featuring a parody of the song to attract tourists and volunteers.

== Performances ==
Da Pump promoted "U.S.A." on Count Down TV on June 28, 2018. They made a surprise guest appearance at Hello! Project's 20th anniversary concert and performed the song. Da Pump also performed "U.S.A." on December 1, 2018 before a Hisamitsu Springs volleyball match in Kobe, Japan.

== Remixes ==
CyberJapan Dancers released an EDM remix, titled "U.S.A. (CyberJapan Dancers Gaya Remix)", on August 22, 2018, accompanied with a music video release on August 16, 2018, on iTunes.

On December 25, 2019, another remix titled "2019 Heartbeat Mix" will be released on the Sonic Groove compilation album Heartbeat.

== Track listing ==
No.	Title	Lyrics	Music	Arrangement	Length
1.	"U.S.A."	Cirella Donatella, Lombardoni, shungo.	Accatino Claudio, Cirelli Donatella, Gioco Anna Maria	KAZ	3:58
2.	"All 2 You"	shungo.	Kotaro Odaka, Hirotaka Hayakawa, UiNA	Kotaro Odaka, Hirotaka Hayakawa, Belex	4:30
3.	"Take It Easy"	m.c.A.T	m.c.A.T	Akio Togashi
4.	"U.S.A." (Instrumental)		Accatino Claudio, Cirelli Donatella, Gioco Anna Maria	KAZ	3:58
5.	"All 2 You" (Instrumental)		Kotaro Odaka, Hirotaka Hayakawa, UiNA	Kotaro Odaka, Hirotaka Hayakawa, Belex	4:30
6.	"Take It Easy" (Instrumental)		m.c.A.T	Akio Togashi

== Charts ==
=== Weekly charts ===
Chart (2018)	Peak position
Billboard Japan Hot 100	2
Oricon Weekly Singles Chart	7

=== All-time charts ===
Chart (2008–2022)	Position
Japan (Japan Hot 100)	24

== Certifications ==
Certifications "U.S.A."
Region	Certification	Certified units/sales
Japan (RIAJ) Physical	Gold	100,000^{^}
Japan (RIAJ) Digital	3× Platinum	750,000^{*}
Streaming
Japan (RIAJ)	Platinum	100,000,000^{†}
^{*} Sales figures based on certification alone.^{^} Shipments figures based on certification alone.^{†} Streaming-only figures based on certification alone.

== Awards and nominations ==
Year	Award	Category	Result
2018	60th Japan Record Award	Excellent Work Award	Nominated
