= Speed the Memorial Best 1335days Dear Friends 2 =

Greatest hits album by Speed
- Released: March 29, 2000
- Genre: J-pop
- Label: Toy's Factory

Speed chronology
Speed the Memorial Best 1335days Dear Friends 1 (2000)	Speed the Memorial Best 1335days Dear Friends 2 (2000)	Speed Memorial Live "One More Dream" + Remix (2000)

Speed the Memorial Best 1335days Dear Friends 2 was the last best album (Part 2) of the Japanese J-pop girlband Speed before their official breakup in 2000. This album was released on March 29, 2000.

== Track listing ==
1. "Back to the Street -リトルワールドへの想い-"
2. "All My True Love"
3. "Alive"
4. "Secret Eyes"
5. "Up to You !"
6. "Precious Time"
7. "Too Young (Millennium remix)"
8. "Breakin' Out to the Morning"
9. "Kisetsu ga iku toki (季節がいく時)"
10. "Long Way Home: Single Version"
11. "Starting Over"
12. "Starting Over (reprise): Walk This Way"
13. "April: Theme of "Dear Friends""
