= Speedland: The Premium Best Re Tracks =

- The cover for the CD+DVD edition

Greatest hits album by Speed
- Released: August 5, 2009
- Genre: House, electronic rock, pop, R&B
- Label: Sonic Groove

Speed chronology
Best Hits Live: Save the Children Speed Live 2003 (2004)	Speedland: The Premium Best Re Tracks (2009)	4 Colors (2012)

Speedland: The Premium Best Re Tracks is a greatest hits package by Japanese female pop group, Speed, released on August 5, 2009. It features several brand new recordings of their past hits completely reworked and rearranged. Their debut single, "Body & Soul" and "White Love" are some of the songs tentatively being included on the album. It is released in a regular single disc edition and a CD+DVD edition. First pressings of the album include a cellphone strap and a poster.

== Track listing ==
=== CD ===
#	Title
1	Long Way Home
2	あしたの空
3	Body & Soul
4	Steady
5	Wake Me Up!
6	Alive
7	White Love
8	Snow Kiss
9	Breakin' Out to the Morning
10	熱帯夜
11	All My True Love
12	Precious Time
13	Go! Go! Heaven
14	My Graduation

=== DVD ===
#	Title
1	Wake Me Up! music clip
2	熱帯夜 music clip
3	あしたの空 music clip
4	Wake Me Up! music clip making
5	Speedの「笑うヨガ講座」
6	熱帯夜 music clip making
7	カメラマン絵理子の「スタジオ探訪」

== Chart performance ==
Oricon Weekly Albums Chart
Peak	First week	Total	Chart run
2	55,177	106,773	11 weeks
