= Speed Memorial Live "One More Dream" + Remix =

Speed Memorial Live “One More Dream” + Remix

Live album by Speed
- Released: December 19, 2001
- Genre: J-pop
- Label: AVEX Trax

Speed chronology
| Speed the Memorial Best 1335days Dear Friends 2 (2000) | Speed Memorial Live “One More Dream” + Remix (2001) | Bridge (2003) |

Speed Memorial Live “One More Dream” + Remix was Japanese J-pop girl band Speed's collection of live songs recorded during their live one-night only concert in 2001, One More Dream. This album was released on December 19, 2001.

== Track listing ==
1. Opening
2. All My True Love
3. Steady
4. Wake Me Up !
5. Alive
6. Carry On My Way
7. White Love
8. Body & Soul
9. Go! Go! Heaven
10. One More Dream
11. Lovely Friendship (ラブリー フレンドシップ, raburii furendoshippu)
12. My Graduation

[Remix]

1. All My True Love (Za Downtown Weekend Mix)
2. Steady (Za Downtown Smoove Mix)
3. White Love (Gospel Mix)
