= Moment (Speed album) =

Greatest hits album by Speed
- Released: 16 December 1998; 10 January 2003 (repackage)
- Genre: J-pop
- Label: Toy's Factory

Speed chronology
Rise (1998)	Moment (1998)	Carry On My Way (1999)

Moment is Japanese J-pop band Speed's greatest hits album following their first album, Starting Over and second album, Rise. Moment was released on 16 December 1998 and contains all the commercially released singles from their first and second albums along with additional tracks. Debuting at number 1 on the Oricon charts and eventually selling 2.32 million copies, Moment is the best-selling album by a female group in Japanese music history.

== Track listing ==
1. White Love
2. All My True Love
3. Steady
4. Wake Me Up! (Growin' Up Mix)
5. Alive
6. Body & Soul
7. Namaiki (Aishiteru Version) (ナマイキ(愛ヴァージョン)) — (Sassy (Love Version))
8. Go! Go! Heaven
9. Nettaiya (熱帯夜) — (Tropical Night)
10. Luv Vibration
11. My Graduation
12. White Love (Christmas Standard)
13. White Love (Christmas Standard) ~Instrumental~

== Charts ==
Chart (1998–1999)	Peak position
Japanese Albums (Oricon)	1
Taiwanese International Albums (IFPI)	1

== Certifications ==
Certifications for Moment
Region	Certification	Certified units/sales
Japan (RIAJ)	2× Million	2,000,000^{^}
Singapore (SPVA)	Platinum	20,000
^{^} Shipments figures based on certification alone.
