= Earth (Japanese band) =

Japanese girl group

- Origin: Tokyo, Japan
- Genres: J-pop
- Years active: 2000–2005
- Label: Sonic Groove
- Past members: Yuka Togo; Maya Tomonaga; Sayaka Setoyama
- Website: www.avexnet.or.jp/earth

Earth (stylized as EARTH) was a Japanese girl group formed by Vision Factory in 2000, with its members consisting of Yuka Togo, Maya Tomonaga, and Sayaka Setoyama. They debuted in February 2000 with the release of the song "Time After Time", and they won the Japan Record Award Newcomer Award and Japan Cable Award Cable Music Award in the same year. They disbanded in January 2005.

== History ==
Togo, Tomonaga, and Setoyama were winners of the Kanagawa & Kyushu Starlight Auditions held in 1999 by Vision Factory. They debuted on February 23, 2000, with the single "Time After Time", which was used as an insert song in the 2000 television drama Virtual Girl. By the end of 2000, the group earned the Newcomer Award at the 42nd Japan Record Awards. Earth also won the Cable Music Award at the 33rd Japan Cable Award for "Time After Time." Earth later disbanded in January 2005.

== Members ==
- Yuka Togo (東郷 祐佳)
- Maya Tomonaga (朝長 真弥)
- Sayaka Setoyama (瀬戸山 清香)

== Discography ==
=== Studio albums ===
List of studio albums, with selected chart positions, sales figures and certifications
Title	Year	Album details	Peak chart positions	Sales
Title	Year	Album details	JPN	Sales
Bright Tomorrow	2001	Released: March 28, 2001; Label: Sonic Groove; Formats: CD	12	—
"—" denotes releases that did not chart or were not released in that region.

=== Singles ===
List of singles, with selected chart positions, sales figures and certifications
Title	Year	Peak chart positions	Sales	Album
Title	Year	JPN	Sales	Album
"Time After Time"	2000	13	—	Bright Tomorrow
"Time After Time (Hip Hop Soul Version)"	2000	27	—	Non-album single
"Your Song"	2000	24	—	Bright Tomorrow
"Is This Love"	2001	13	—	Bright Tomorrow
"Make Up Your Mind"	2001	38	—	Non-album single
"Color of Seasons"	2001	19	—	Non-album single
"—" denotes releases that did not chart or were not released in that region.

== Awards ==
Year	Award	Category	Nominated work	Result
2000	42nd Japan Record Award	Newcomer Award	Earth	Won
2000	33rd Japan Cable Award	Cable Music Award	"Time After Time"	Won
