= Best Hits Live: Save the Children Speed Live 2003 =

Live album by Speed
- Released: February 25, 2004
- Genre: J-pop
- Label: AVEX Trax

Speed chronology
Bridge (2003)	Best Hits Live: Save the Children Speed Live 2003 (2004)	Speedland: The Premium Best Re Tracks (2009)

Best Hits Live: Save the Children Speed Live 2003 is a collection of live songs recorded by Japanese J-pop girlband Speed's during one of the concerts they performed in 2003. This album was released on 25 February 2004, as part of the "Save the Children" charity project.

== Track listing ==
1. "Be My Love"
2. "Go!Go!Heaven"
3. "Steady"
4. "All My True Love"
5. "Snow Kiss" (Unplugged)
6. "My Graduation" (Unplugged)
7. "Alive"
8. "Walking in the Rain"
9. "Long Way Home"
10. "Stars to Shine Again"
11. "Body & Soul"
12. "White Love"
13. "Breakin' Out to the Morning"
14. "Wake Me Up!"
15. Nettaiya (熱帯夜) — (Tropical Night)
