= Eriko Imai =

Japanese pop singer, actress and politician (born 1983)

- 今井 絵理子
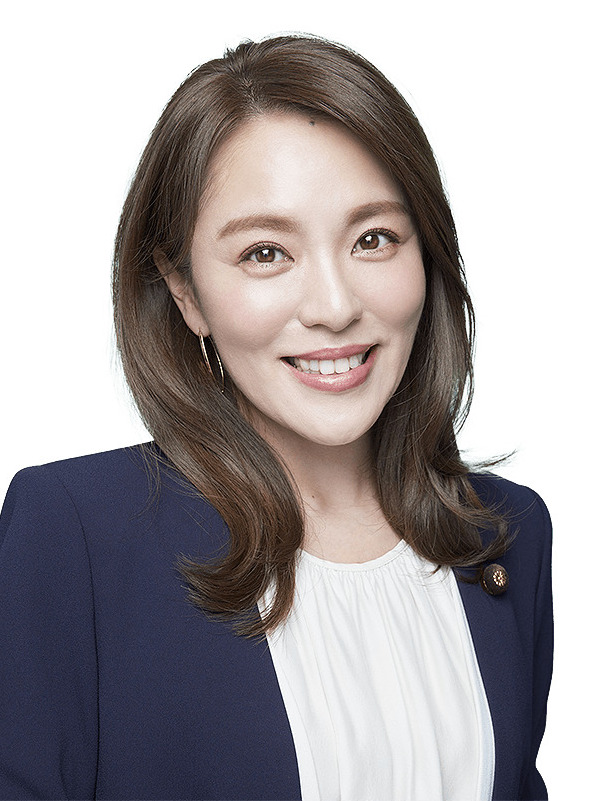
- Official portrait, 2024

Member of the House of Councillors
- Incumbent
- Assumed office 26 July 2016
- Constituency: National PR

Personal details
- Born: 22 September 1983 (age 43) Naha, Okinawa Prefecture, Japan
- Occupation: Actress; singer-songwriter; politician
- Musical career
- Genre: J-pop
- Instruments: Vocals; piano; guitar
- Years active: 1995–present
- Label: Toy's Factory
- Website: "Elly" official site

Eriko Imai (今井 絵理子, Imai Eriko) is a Japanese pop singer, actress and politician. She made her debut in the early 1990s as part of the group Speed, which disbanded in March 2000. Eriko began her work away from Speed during 1998, performing "Tsumetaku Shinai de", under the stage name "Eriko with Crunch", on the Speed single "All My True Love". After the group disbanded, Imai continued her career as a solo artist until Speed's reformation in 2008.

== Career ==
=== Early career (1996–2000) ===
Imai was born in Okinawa. She was the second-youngest member and one of the main vocalists in the female J-pop group Speed. After Speed's popularity spread widely in Japan, they were asked to act in the movie Andromedia in 1998, Eriko's first acting experience. Eriko also appeared in the drama "LxIxVxE" in 1999 with fellow Speed member Hitoe Arakaki. When Eriko began her solo career in early 2000, she teamed up with the dance group Crunch and the unit was named "Eriko with Crunch". Their first two maxi singles, "Red Beat of My Life" and "Luv is Magic" were released the same year.

=== Post-Speed (2000–2004) ===
"Eriko with Crunch" was short-lived, and Imai began her solo career with the single "In the Name of Love", released in 2000. Also during this year, Eriko participated in her first musical, Ninagawa Hi no Tori, for which she earned a "Best Newcomer in Theatre" award at the Golden Arrow Awards 2001.

Her second solo single, "Identity", was viewed as a changing point in Eriko's career. Many viewed the music as hard-core rock. The music video for her third single, "Set Me Free", was shot in Australia, and Imai performed the song in Kuala Lumpur during the 2001 Asia Music Festival. In 2001, Imai released her first album, My Place. Including her self-composed songs "Himawari" and "Dawn", it sold 93,700 copies and peaked at No. 7 on the weekly Oricon chart. During this year, Eriko performed in her second drama, Rouge, and appeared in the movie Onmyoji.

Eriko's fourth solo single, "Don't Stop the Music", was aired on Eriko's weekly Monday night radio talk show "Eriko Imai Hot Link" more than a month prior to its release in January 2002. The single was seen as a change of genre in Eriko's music. At around this time, Eriko considered changing her hairstyle to an Afro. She said that she wanted something new, but was willing to return to a more Japanese-typical hairstyle if the Afro hairstyle reduced her appeal. In July, Eriko released her fifth solo single, "Our Relation", an upbeat, high-tempo ballad. "Our Relation" was the second single to be fully produced by Hiroaki Hayama, also used as the second opening theme to Captain Tsubasa: ROAD to 2002. Also in 2002, Eriko appeared in her second musical, Footloose, with V6 member Masayuki Sakamoto, which was extremely well received.

From the end of 2002 to mid-2003, Eriko put a temporary hold on solo releases, mainly due to the temporary reformation of Speed for charity Save The Children. Speed became the ambassadors of Save The Children until the end of 2003, during which time they performed on nationwide tours and released singles and an album to raise funds for the charity. It was not until July of that year that Eriko released her sixth and last single, "Butterfly". "Butterfly" was a ballad written by Eriko under the name "Elly". This was the first time Imai officially used the name "Elly" on one of her works. The song was also the theme song for the anime movie Boku no Songokū, Eriko's first role as a voice actor. That October, Onmyoji 2 was released in Japan, with Eriko reprising her role as the magic spirit Mitsumushi.

Between February and March 2004, Eriko performed in the musical Star Tanjō with Hitomi Shimatani and Yukie Nakama. During May 2004, Eriko posted a short message on her official website to officially announce on her marriage to 175R vocalist Shogo. The message talked briefly about the marriage, and she apologised due to its sudden nature. She also mentioned a new life which would be with us on Earth in the upcoming October. Lastly in the message, Eriko asked for guidance on her change from single to a wife and a soon-to-be mother. On 9 June 2004, she and Shogo were married in a shotgun wedding. She also registered her name as Eriko Kinoshita upon the change. Their son, Raimu Kinoshita, was born on 18 October 2004 weighing 3492g. On 25 November 2004, Eriko released her first singles collection, Stairway, to mark her new life journey as a mother and wife.

=== As Elly (2005–2008) ===
On 9 June 2005, Eriko announced on her new website that she would return to the music industry as "Elly". With the new name, Imai branched out into a new genre of music. Upon returning to the music scene Eriko began writing all of her songs, which differed greatly from her former style. On 22 September 2005, Eriko performed her 'Elly Live 2005: Rebirth' concert to mark her 22nd birthday and shift to the new name. This was Imai's first public performance since her marriage and maternity leave. She also released her first indies single under as Elly, sold only at her concert venues. On 18 October 2005, the first birthday of her son, Imai released her first photobook, "Egao de Ikō", which includes autobiographical thoughts about the periods of her life and career. She also held an autograph session at Shibuya HMV on 6 November.

Elly released her second indies single, "Journey" on 13 May 2006, following up the release with a concert "Elly Live 2006: Journey" on the same day. In June 2006 Elly held a secret marriage party in Guam. Only her close friends, such as Hiro and Team-F, were invited. On 16 July, she attended Vision Festival Vol.2, where she performed her new song with Vanilla Mood. At the festival, Imai also announced to her fans that her new album Neverland was to be released on 27 September 2006. Given the lack of promotion and Imai's declining popularity, Neverland debuted at No. 149 on the Oricon charts, ultimately being placed at No. 165 on the weekly charts. She performed her "Elly Live 2006: Neverland" concert tour from October to November, of which one of the performances was attended by fellow Speed members and long-time producer Hiromasa Ijichi. During that particular live, Imai sang Speed singles "Walking in the Rain" and "White Love" with Ijichi.

In July 2007, it was reported by various sources that Eriko had separated from her husband, Shogo. Reports from TokyoGraph and J!-Ent news sources indicated the separation was due to Eriko's focus on her career and social calendar, with Shogo wanting to raise Raimu. However, this matter was not clarified by either party's management. After these media reports, Eriko posted a short and cryptic message on her official site, reading: "only believe what was seen and heard from oneself". Many fans took it as an indirect reply to the separation reports and that Eriko was trying to indicate the reports were untrue.

Also in August 2007, Imai announced she would be releasing her new single "Ude Makura" (腕枕) at a later date. The single, however, was never released, instead ending up on Imai's album Utagoe.

On 24 September 2007, Eriko and Shogo officially announced their divorce on Imai's website. According to the message, the divorce was mainly due to their divergent views and concepts about the future, and therefore leading to the inability to live together like before. Eriko was given custody of their son, but both agreed to take care of the child together. Imai performed at her mini live concert "Elly Live: Instinct" on 25 December 2007. Imai held her next live concert in 2008, "Elly Secret Live in Sabaku no Bara" on 9 February 2008. This secret performance was limited to an audience of only 100 people.

In August 2008, Imai decided to regroup with Speed for NTV's 24-hour telethon. During this time she announced that her son has a hearing disability, and wanted to take the opportunity to perform for her son for the first time, and to give hope to others who are also suffering from the same disability. She resumed activities with Speed again starting on 31 August 2008. Eriko also made her first film appearance in almost five years, in "Yuzuriha: Kimi mo Mata Tsugi no Kimi e", directed by Kentarō Hayase. The picture is a 60th-anniversary project of the Japanese Federation of the Deaf. Eriko also started a web programme called Elly ch: '...& Smile' on 18 October, in which she invites her friends as guests or shows footage of her concerts.

=== Return to Eriko Imai (2009–present) ===
Eriko released her second photobook, Kokoro no Uta: Musuko to Ayunda 4 Nenkan, Soshite Korekara, on 14 February 2009. Her new album, Utagoe, was released on 29 April. Her ex-husband, Shogo, composed the songs "Kanna" and "Hana Uta" for the album. Utagoe debuted at #31, selling 3,882 copies in its first week. On 10 May, which was Mother's Day, Eriko received a 'Best Mother' award for the second annual 'Best Mother Awards in 2009' in Japan.

In 2010, Eriko was a host in the sign language education programme NHK Minna No Showa. (Eriko has a son who is Deaf.) Eriko also made a live announcement via USTREAM on 22 September, 10.10 p.m. to announce her upcoming solo live: 'Imai Eriko live 2010 ~Your selection~' which is currently planned for November. In this concert, Eriko will perform the top 10 favourite songs from her solo careers as Eriko with Crunch, Imai Eriko and elly. Fans will get to choose the top 10 songs via a poll on her website. Follow-up announcements will be made live on USTREAM on 1 and 10 October at 10.10p.m. respectively. She also revealed a new song, temporarily titled "Cowgirl", on her last Ustream announcement. The official title will be decided once fans gave their ideas through the inquiry forms given out during her lives in November. The song was officially called "Cow☆G" during her last appearance on Ustream.

In 2011, a documentary was broadcast on NHK on 3 May 2011 documenting her life with her son over the past six years. It was broadcast as an Ear Day Special program. The show was entitled Nankurunaisaa ~Imai Eriko ga Musuko to Arunda 6 Nen. Eriko also released a new song, "Nankurunaisaa", as a digital and iTunes download on 6 April 2011. Eriko released her third book, entitled Oyako Gejiko, on 8 April 2011. Eriko continued to be a host for NHK's Minna no Shuwa on 3 April 2011.

== Personal life ==
After Imai's shotgun wedding in 2004 to 175R's Shogo, due to her pregnancy, tabloid magazine Shukan Bunshun quoted a source known to Eriko that her management agency had stopped paying her monthly wage of 200,000 yen and promptly expelled her from the company apartment. After struggling for several months, her company relented its punishment by signing a new contract worth 20,000 yen a month.

Eriko's nickname is Mikan Seijin (Tangerine Alien). She is an accomplished guitar and flute player. She also plays the piano, as well as composing and writing songs. She is good friends with Hikaru Utada and called her father on air on behalf of her fans when she underwent ovarian cancer surgery. Eriko was once voted as the most popular artist from Japan in Hong Kong, surpassing other popular singers. Eriko began to learn sign language with her son during early 2008. She is also avid in saving the environment by doing bottle-cap collections.

In 2016, Imai became a candidate for the Japanese House of Councillors election under the ruling Liberal Democratic Party and won.

In November 2021, Imai will be releasing a memoir of her life, a member of SPEED, being a single mother, raising a son with congenital deafness, her activism for children with disabilities, being a politician and more.

Imai's son Raimu is a professional wrestler.

== Discography ==
=== Albums ===
Eriko Imai

- My Place (18 July 2001)
- Single Collection: Stairway (25 November 2004)
- Utagoe (うたごえ; "Singing Voice") (29 April 2009)

Elly

- Neverland (27 September 2006)

=== Singles ===
Eriko with Crunch

- Speed – All My True Love (on track "Tsumetaku Shinai de" (冷たくしないで; "Don't Be Cold-hearted"), 28 October 1998)
- "Speed – Breakin' Out to the Morning (on track "EVERYDAY, BE WITH YOU", 19 May 1999)
- "Red Beat of My Life" (15 March 2000)
- "Luv is Magic" (2 August 2000)

Eriko Imai

- "In the Name of Love" (22 November 2000)
- "identity" (7 March 2001)
- "Set Me Free!" (6 June 2001)
- "Don't Stop The Music" (23 January 2002)
- "Our Relation" (10 July 2002)
- "Butterfly" (2 July 2003)

Elly

- "star" (22 September 2005)
- "journey" (13 May 2006)

=== Unreleased songs ===
- "Shiawase to Yobitai" (幸せと呼びたい)
- "Good Night"
- "Uso" (嘘; "Lie")
- "Kimi wa Kimi no Mama de" (君は君のままで)
- "New Days"
- "Sekai-"世界一 ("World-")
- "Namidaboshi" (涙星)

=== DVDs ===
Eriko Imai

- My Place on Films (19 December 2001)
- Eriko Imai LIVE 2010～Your Selection」DVD (22 February 2011)

Elly

- A Gift For You: Elly Live 2006 Neverland (14 February 2007)
- A Gift For You Vol.2: Elly Live 2007 Instinct (14 February 2008)

=== Mobile download (Chaku Uta) ===
- "Yukizora Letter" (雪空Letter) (18 December 2006)
- "Hajimari no Kisu" (始まりのキス; "First Kiss") (1 January 2007)
- "Horonigai Chocolate" (ほろ苦いチョコレート; "Bitter-sweet Chocolate") (7 February 2007)
- "Nankurunaisaa" (なんくるないさぁ; "It will be alright") (6 April 2011)

=== Books ===
- "Egao De Ikō (笑顔でいこう; "Let's Smile") (18 October 2005)
- "Kokoro no Uta: Musuko to Ayunda 4 Nenkan, Soshite Korekara" (ココロノウタ〜息子と歩んだ四年間、そしてこれから; "Heart's Song: Walking With My 4-Year-Old Son, and From Now On") (14 February 2009)
- "Oyako Gejiko (おやこ劇場) (8 April 2011)

=== Movies ===
- "Andromedia" (1998)
- "Dream Maker" (Cameo, 1999)
- "Pinch Runner" (Cameo, 2000)
- "Onmyoji" (2001)
- "Onmyoji 2" (2003)
- "Boku no Songokū" (ぼくのそんごくう) (Voice and theme song ("Butterfly"), 2003)
- "Yuzuriha: Kimi mo Mata Tsugi no Kimi e" (ゆずり葉-君もまた次のきみへ-) (2009)

=== Solo lives ===
- Elly Live 2005: Rebirth (22 September 2005)
- Elly Live 2006: Journey (13 May 2006)
- Elly Live 2006: Neverland (22–28 October 2006)(12 November 2006, 22 November 2006)
- Elly Live 2007: Soar (3 April 2007)
- Eriko Imai Christmas Live 2007: Instinct (25 December 2007)
- Elly Presents Live 2008 (9 February 2008)
- Imai Eriko Live & Talk (30 September 2008)
- Imai Eriko Live 2009: Utagoe (23–31 May 2009) -cancelled due to H1N1-
- Imai Eriko Live 2010: Your Selection (November 2010)

=== Musicals ===
- "Ninagawa Hi no Tori" (NINAGAWA 火の鳥; "Ninagawa Phoenix") (2000)
- "Footloose" (2002)
- "Star Tanjō" (スター誕生; "A Star Is Born") (2004)

=== TV ===
- "LxIxVxE" (1999)
- "Shinjuku Bōsō Kyūkyūtai" (新宿暴走救急隊) (Guest Appearance, 2000)
- "Rouge" (2001)
- "NHK Minna no Shuwa" (NHKみんなの手話; "NHK Sign Language For Everyone") (4 April 2010~26 September 2010)
- "NHK Minna no Shuwa" (NHKみんなの手話; "NHK Sign Language For Everyone") (3 April 2011)

=== Radio ===
- "Eriko Imai Hot Link" (2000–2003)
