= S.P.D. (song) =

Single by Speed
- B-side: "Utakata"
- Released: May 27, 2009
- Genre: Pop
- Length: 3:58
- Label: Sonic Groove
- Songwriter(s): Shungo., Kye Sones, Peter Martin, Jonathan Shav

Speed singles chronology
"Ashita no Sora" (2008)	"S.P.D." (2009)

Alternative cover
- CD+DVD cover

"S.P.D." is Speed's 16th single under the Sonic Groove label, released on May 27, 2009. The title is an acronym for "Splendid Pop Dance". The concept of the single is to introduce a brand new Speed with a new sound courtesy of foreign writers. It is their second single to be neither written nor produced by producer Hiromasa Ijichi.

== Track list ==
=== CD ===
#	Title	Songwriters	Time
1.	"S.P.D."	Shungo., Kye Sones, Peter Martin, Jonathan Shav	3:58
2.	"Utakata"	Shungo., Mats Lie Skare	3:07
3.	"S.P.D. (Instrumental)"	Kye Sones, Peter Martin, Jonathan Shav	3:58
4.	"Utakata (Instrumental)"	Mats Lie Skare	3:06

=== DVD ===
#	Title
1.	S.P.D. (Music Clip)
2.	S.P.D. (Off Shot)

== Chart performance ==
Oricon Weekly Singles Chart
Peak	First week	Total	Chart run
8	20,664	28,900	5 weeks
