= Bridge (Speed album) =

Studio album by Speed
- Released: November 27, 2003
- Genre: J-pop
- Label: Avex Trax
- Producers: Hiromasa Ijichi, TommyFebruary6, Chara, The Gospellers, Tsunku

Speed chronology
Speed Memorial Live "One More Dream" + Remix (2001)	Bridge (2003)	Best Hits Live: Save the Children Speed Live 2003 (2004)

Bridge is an album by J-pop girlband Speed, released on November 27, 2003. This album was released as part of the "Save the Children" charity project in 2003. It contains their new singles Be My Love and Walking In the Rain/Stars to Shine Again. The album is unique in that it is produced by different artists, not just their main producer: this leads some people to believe it doesn't sound like an album: however, not many people are aware it is produced by different top performers and producers.

== Track listing ==
1. "Be My Love"
2. "Stars to Shine Again" Produced by Tommy february6.
3. "Cryin'"
4. "Walking in the Rain" Produced by The Gospellers.
5. "Need Your Hands Tonight"
6. "Way To Go!" Produced by Tsunku.
7. "Bridge to Heaven"
8. "Kiss": Produced by Chara.
9. "Kimi to mata aeru hi wo (君とまた会える日を)"
10. "Still Blowing:"
11. "Hana (華)"
12. "Yotsuba no clover (四ツ葉のクローバー)"
13. "With..."

== Charts ==
Chart (2003)	Peak position
Japanese Albums (Oricon)	9

== Certifications ==
Certifications for Bridge
Region	Certification	Certified units/sales
Japan (RIAJ)	Gold	100,000^{^}
^{^} Shipments figures based on certification alone.
