= Vanilla Mood =

Japanese musical ensemble

- Origin: Tokyo, Japan
- Genres: J-pop
- Years active: 2006-present
- Label: Avex
- Members: Keiko; Mariko; Yui
- Past members: Emilee; Waka

Vanilla Mood is a Japanese musical ensemble associated with Rising Production, consisting of members Keiko (piano, keyboard, vocals), Yui (violin), and Mariko (cello).

== Members ==
=== Current members ===
- Keiko — piano, keyboard, vocals
- Yui — violin
- Mariko — cello

=== Former members ===
- Emilee — violin
- Waka — flute

== Discography ==
=== Extended plays ===
List of extended plays, with selected chart positions, sales figures and certifications
Title	Year	Album details	Peak chart positions	Sales
Title	Year	Album details	JPN	Sales
Vanilla Mood	2006	Released: February 8, 2006; Label: Sonic Groove; Formats: CD	180	—
Shizuku (雫)	2006	Released: October 4, 2006; Label: Sonic Groove; Formats: CD	220	—
"—" denotes releases that did not chart or were not released in that region.

=== Singles ===
List of singles, with selected chart positions, sales figures and certifications
Title	Year	Peak chart positions	Sales	Album
Title	Year	JPN	Sales	Album
"Ajuka" (アジュカ)	2007	—	—	Non-album single
"—" denotes releases that did not chart or were not released in that region.
