= Nana Tanimura =

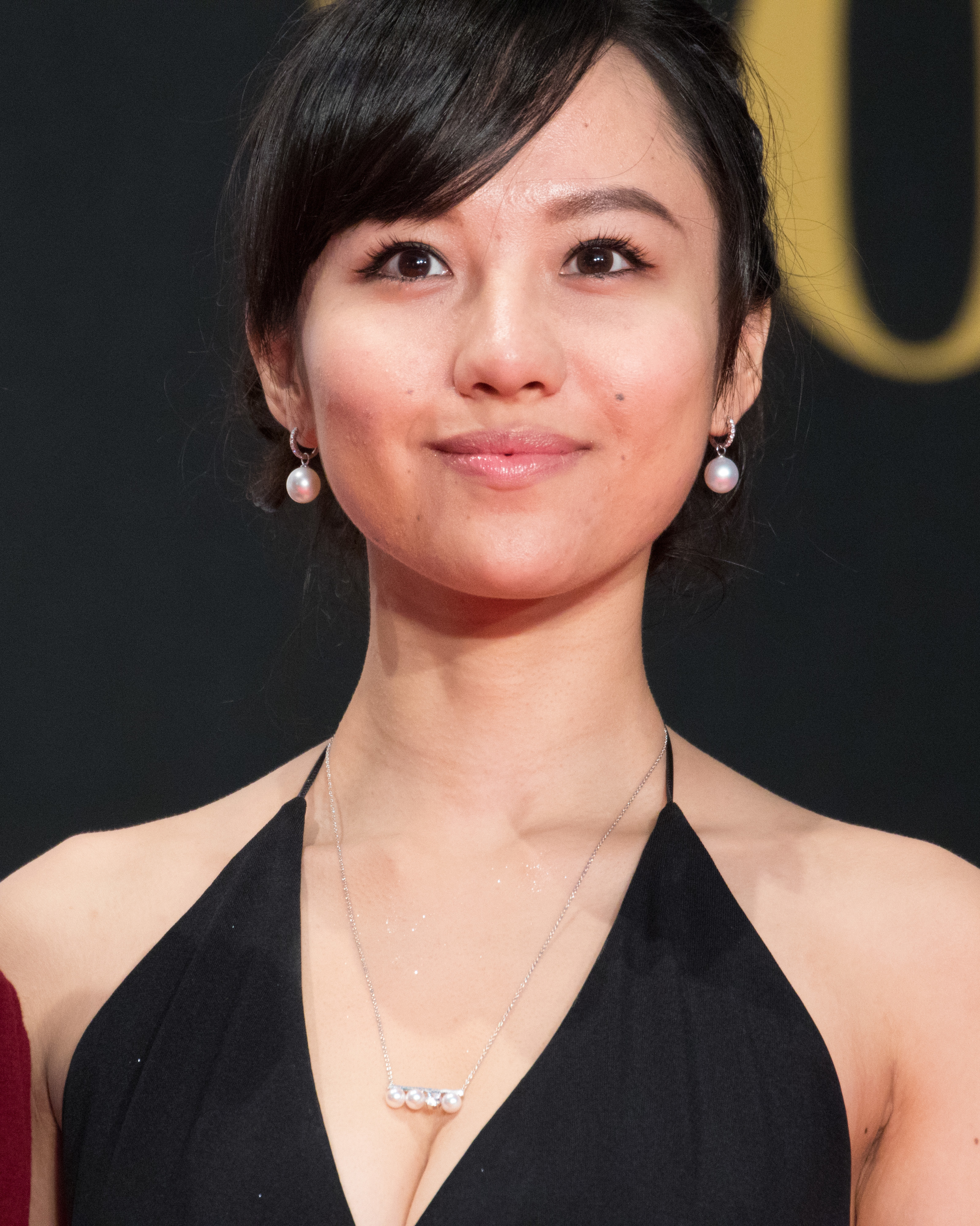

Background information
- Born: September 10, 1987 (age 38)
- Origin: Sapporo, Hokkaidō, Japan; Newcastle, United Kingdom
- Genres: J-pop; power pop; pop rock
- Occupations: Singer; lyricist; composer; voice actress
- Instrument: Vocals
- Years active: 2007–present
- Labels: Avex (Sonic Groove sub-label)
- Website: tanimuranana.com

Nana Tanimura (谷村 奈南, Tanimura Nana; born September 10, 1987, in Sapporo), is a Japanese pop singer.

== Background ==
Tanimura was raised mainly in Osaka. She moved frequently between Osaka and Hawaii between the ages of 3 and 8, after which she also stayed for an extended period of time in Los Angeles.

Tanimura was enrolled in the College of Law at Aoyama Gakuin University and graduated in March 2010.

She was married to professional boxer Kazuto Ioka; they divorced in 2018.

== Career ==
In her third year of high school, Tanimura caught the attention of music production agents at an event in Osaka. In 2007, her first singles, "Again" and "Say Good-Bye" were released under Avex Group's Sonic Groove label. The singles peaked at No. 55 and No. 105 on the Oricon charts, respectively. In 2008, Tanimura released the singles "Jungle Dance" and "If I'm Not the One / Sexy Senorita". They peaked at No. 15 and No. 8 on the Oricon charts, respectively.

In 2010, she was chosen to sing the official theme songs of the game Hokuto Musō. The songs were released as part of "Far Away / Believe You" on March 24, 2010.

== Discography ==
=== Albums ===
Title	Release date	Daily ranking*	Weekly ranking*	Sales	Kind
Nana Best	2011-08-10	7	15	11,000	Compilation
*Oricon Charts

=== Singles ===
Title	Release date	Weekly ranking*	Sales	Album
Again	2007-05-30	55	—	Nana Best
Say Good-Bye	2007-11-14	105	—	Nana Best
Jungle Dance	2008-05-30	15	28,000	Nana Best
If I'm Not the One / Sexy Senorita	2008-08-13	8	28,000	Nana Best
Crazy for You	2009-02-18	10	15,000	Nana Best
Every-body	2009-07-08	16	8,000	Nana Best
Far Away / Believe You	2010-03-24	11	10,000	Nana Best
Toxic	2010-11-24	39	5,000	Nana Best
*Oricon Charts
