= Rise (Speed album) =

Studio album by Speed
- Released: 29 April 1998
- Genre: J-pop
- Label: Toy's Factory
- Producer: Hiromasa Ijichi

Speed chronology
Starting Over (1997)	Rise (1998)	Moment (1998)

Rise is the second studio album by Japanese band Speed. The album was released on 29 April 1998 and contains the singles "Wake Me Up!", "My Graduation" and their all-time biggest hit, "White Love". The album successfully topped the Oricon sales charts eventually selling 2.09 million copies making it the best selling original studio album by a female group in Japan. They later embarked on a summer tour titled "Rise Dome Tour" to promote their album becoming the first female Jpop group ever to complete the dome tour in Japan.

== Track listing ==
1. Rise
2. Sophisticated Girl
3. Another Sweet Field
4. Wake Me Up (Rise Mix)
5. White Love
6. Lovely Friendship (ラブリー フレンドシップ, roberii furenshippu)
7. Reset 99 to 00
8. Brand New Weekend (Varick Street Mix)
9. Nettaiya (熱帯夜) — (Tropical Night)
10. Too Young
11. My Graduation (Album Version)
12. I'll Be Alright
13. Street Life

== Charts ==
Chart (1998)	Peak position
Japanese Albums (Oricon)	1

== Certifications ==
Certifications for Rise
Region	Certification	Certified units/sales
Japan (RIAJ)	2× Million	2,000,000^{^}
^{^} Shipments figures based on certification alone.
