= White Love (Speed song) =

Single by Speed

from the album Rise
- B-side: "Namaiki"
- Released: October 15, 1997
- Genre: J-pop
- Length: 5:33 (original); 05:12 (nightcore)
- Label: Toy's Factory
- Songwriter: Hiromasa Ijichi

Speed singles chronology
""Wake Me Up!"" (1997)	"White Love" (1997)	"My Graduation" (1998)

"White Love" is a single by Japanese girl group Speed. It was released on October 15, 1997. The song marked a point in Speed's career when their style shifted from dance music to other genres, such as ballads. It was number-one on the Oricon Weekly Singles Chart. It was the 10th best-selling single in Japan in 1997, with 1.164 million copies sold and it has sold a total of 1.845 million copies.

In 2012, Su-metal of the kawaii metal group Babymetal performed a cover during their Legend "D" show at Akasaka Blitz, which coincided with her 15th birthday. The song was chosen because it was a hit in 1997, the year of her birth. In 2022, the J-pop duo ClariS performed a cover for their mini-album Winter Tracks.

== Track listing ==
All songs are written by Hiromasa Ijichi; all music is arranged by Yasutaka Mizushima.

No.	Title	Length
1.	"White Love"	05:33
2.	"Namaiki" ((ナマイキ))
3.	"White Love" (Instrumental)	05:34
4.	"Namaiki" (Instrumental)

== Weekly charts ==
Chart (1997)	Peak position
Japan Singles Chart (Oricon)	1
