= Da Pump =

Japanese boy band

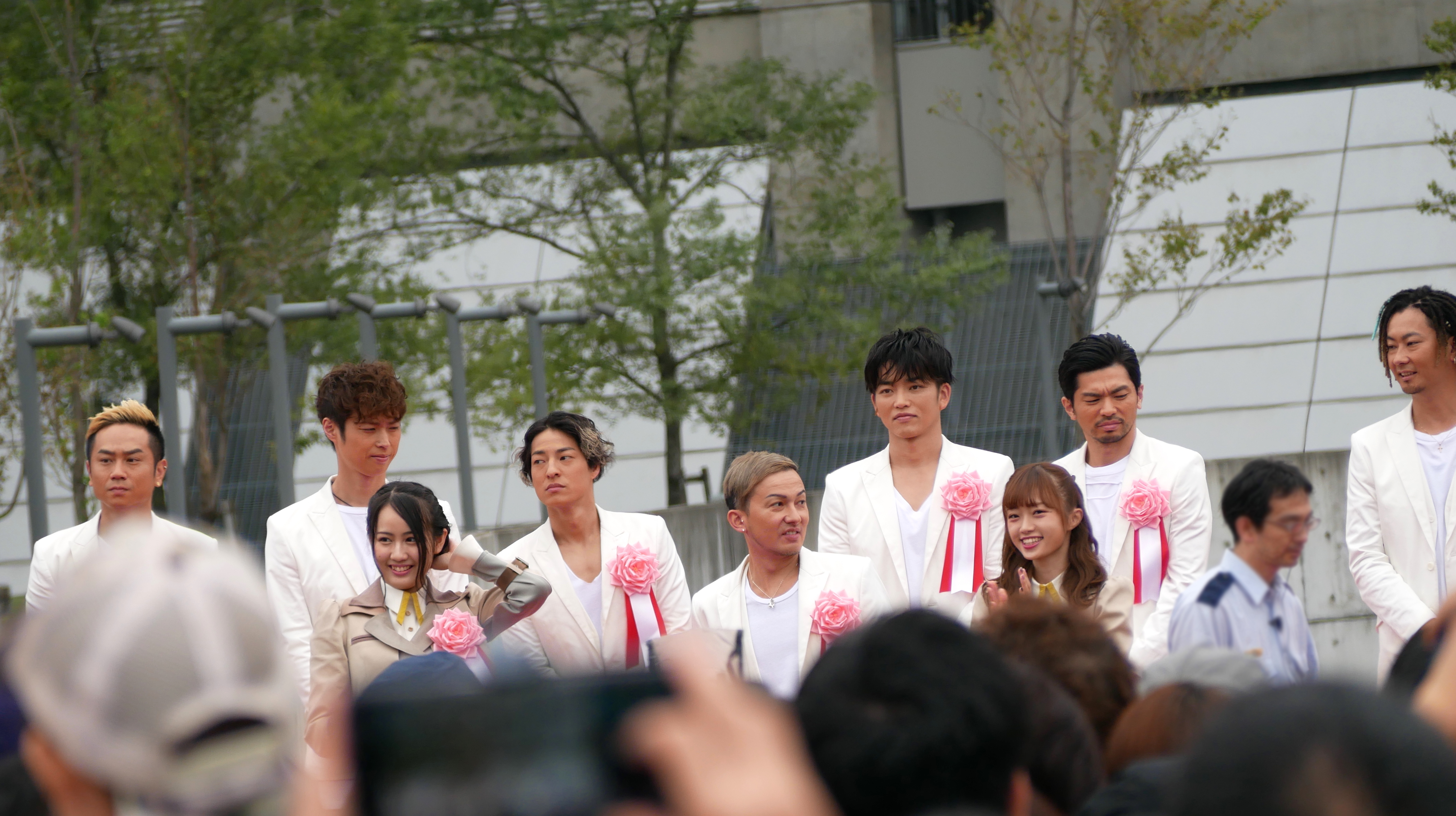
- September, 2016

Background information
- Origin: Naha, Okinawa, Japan
- Genres: J-pop, EDM, Eurodance, hip hop
- Years active: 1996–present
- Label: Avex Tune
- Members: Issa (1996–present); Kenzo (2008–present); Tomo (2008–present); Kimi (2008–present); Yori (2008–present); U-Yeah (2008–present)
- Past members: Shinobu (1996–2006); Yukinari (1996–2008); Ken (1996–2009); Kazuma (2008–2013); Daichi (2008–2021)
- Website: avexnet.or.jp/dapump Archived website

Da Pump (ダパンプ, Da Panpu, stylized in all caps) is a Japanese boy band made up of lead vocalist, Issa Hentona and MCs Ken Okumoto, Yukinari Tamaki and Shinobu Miyara. The band formed as students at Okinawa Actors School in 1996. They made their debut on the Avex Trax subsidiary avex tune under the guidance of producer Akio Togashi on June 11, 1997, with "Feelin' Good - It's Paradise". As one of the few male bands unassociated with Johnny's Entertainment, they were the first to gain major popularity reaching their peak in 2001 with the release of Da Best of Da Pump.

On April 7, 2006, Shinobu formally left the band following a hiatus due to a drunk driving incident in 2005. The band went on an unofficial hiatus at the end of 2006. On December 18, 2008, it was announced that Yukinari was leaving the band and that Ken and Issa were actively looking for his replacement. Within hours, their management company announced a brand new Da Pump with seven new members and a new concept as a multimedia entertainment group. The band will start their official comeback on July 15, 2009, with the new single, "Summer Rider" and a tour in the fall. It was announced on December 5, 2009, that Ken Okumoto had left Da Pump to pursue a solo career, leaving Issa the only original member left. Da Pump now consists of Issa, Kenzo, Tomo, Kimi, Yori, and U-Yeah.

Da Pump made their comeback in May 2018 with the hit single, "U.S.A.", a song originally written by Italian singer Joe Yellow.

== Biography ==
Famed for their ability in both dancing and singing, Da Pump's debut came in 1997, with the song "Feelin Good - It's Paradise" and breaking through with "Rhapsody in Blue" (and using the song as their entry on the "white" team during the 1998 Kōhaku Uta Gassen). The band originally came from Okinawa Actors School but are now part of the Avex Network and are produced by Akio Togashi. Their songs tend to have a quick tempo and often include elements of rap. Da Pump often appears in TV shows, movies, and magazines throughout Japan.

Issa has stated that he is a fan of the long-running Kamen Rider Series tokusatsu programs, and has contributed to the soundtracks of Kamen Rider 555 with its opening theme "Justiφ's" and its film's theme "Justiφ's -Accel Mix-" as well as the theme for the film Kamen Rider: The Next, "Chosen Soldier". As a band, Da Pump had performed the theme to the film Kamen Rider: The First, "Bright! our Future", and Issa played the role of a Shocker commander in the film. In 2018, he and Japanese singer Shuta Sueyoshi of AAA fame collaborated on the single Over "Quartzer", the opening theme for the 20th anniversary series of the Kamen Rider franchise, Kamen Rider Zi-O.

Following a DUI arrest in 2005, Shinobu temporarily suspended all activities from the band. However, on 7 April 2006, he officially announced that he left the group. The remaining members of Da Pump continued with three members. On December 18, 2008, it was announced that Yukinari was leaving the band and that Ken and Issa were actively looking for his replacement. Within hours, their management company announced a brand new Da Pump with seven new members. Ken left the group in 2009.

In 2014, the band returned with their first single in three years, "New Position". Then after an absence of four years, Da Pump returned the hit single, "U.S.A.", in 2018.

On April 1, 2021, Daichi announced he would be leaving the group by the end of the month due to worsening of his chronic hernia. Later the same day, the Kansai University of Social Welfare posted a music video, in collaboration with DA PUMP, for a song titled "Believe in your dream", co-written by Issa and m.c.A·T.

== Members ==
=== Current members ===
- Issa Hentona (辺土名 一茶, Hentona Issa; ISSA) (Born: December 9, 1978) (1996–present)
- Tomoki Nakamura (中村 朋挥, Nakamura Tomoki; KENZO) (Born: January 21, 1985) (2008–present)
- Tomohiro Taniguchi (谷口 知広, Taniguchi Tomohiro; TOMO) (Born: February 2, 1981) (2008–present)
- Kimitaka Gondo (近藤 公贵, Gondō Kimitaka; KIMI) (Born: April 14, 1983) (2008–present)
- YORI (Born: February 9, 1980) (2008–present)
- Yūya Tanimoto (谷本 裕也, Tanimoto Yūya; U-YEAH) (Born: September 17, 1983) (2008–present)

=== Former members ===
- Shinobu Miyara (宫良 忍, Miyara Shinobu; SHINOBU) (Born: February 15, 1980) (1996–2005)
- Yukinari Tamaki (玉城 幸也, Tamaki Yukinari; YUKINARI) (Born: November 5, 1978) (1996–2008)
- Ken Okumoto (奥本 健, Okumoto Ken; KEN) (Born: December 17, 1979) (1996–2009)
- Kazuma Yamane (山根 和马, Yamane Kazuma; KAZUMA) (Born: March 6, 1984) (2008–2013)
- Daichi Kato (加藤 大地, Katō Daichi; DAICHI) (Born: December 4, 1988) (2008–2021)

== Discography ==
=== Studio albums ===
- 1998: Expression
- 1999: Higher and Higher!
- 2000: Beat Ball
- 2002: The Next Exit
- 2004: Shippuu Ranbu -Episode II-
- 2005: Lequios
- 2022: Da Pop Colors
- 2025: Back 2 da Unity

=== Other albums ===
- 2001: Da Best of Da Pump
- 2001: Da Best Remix of Da Pump
- 2003: Da Best of Da Pump Japan Tour 2003 Reborn
- 2006: Da Best of Da Pump 2+4

=== Notable singles ===
- 1997: "Feelin' Good -It's Paradise-"
- 1999: "We Can't Stop The Music"
- 2000: "If..."
- 2009: "Summer Rider"
- 2014: "New Position"
- 2018: "U.S.A."
- 2019: "P.A.R.T.Y. ~Universal Festival~"

== Solo projects ==
=== Issa ===
==== Singles ====
- "Justiφ's" (12 March 2003) - Opening for the series, Kamen Rider 555.
- "Play, This, Satisfy" (23 April 2003)
- "Chosen Soldier" (17 October 2007) - Theme for Kamen Rider The Next
- "Breathe" (22 September 2010, ISSA × SoulJa)
- "4 chords" (9 March 2011, ISSA × SoulJa)
- "i hate u" (12 October 2011, ISSA × SoulJa + Rola)
- "Over Quartzer" (23 January 2019 (Shuta Sueyoshi feat. ISSA)) - Kamen Rider Zi-O Opening theme
- "Dragon Screamer" (18 November 2001, ISSA) First Opening of Captain Tsubasa: Road to 2002

==== Albums ====
- Extension (21 May 2003)
- ISM (29 February 2012, ISSA × SoulJa; with tracks featuring Rola, Next?, Yui Minemura, and Anna Fujita)

==== Collaborative releases ====
- MAX / "Emotional History" (14 March 2001)
  - "But My Love feat. ISSA"
- Album Christmas Harmony: Vision Factory Presents (21 November 2007)
  - "Shiroi Yuki"

=== Ken ===
==== Collaborative releases ====
- Hiro / Naked and True (7 August 2002)
  - "Crazy feat. Ken"
- Viewtiful Joe (Sotaro feat. Ken) (3 July 2003) Theme of Viewtiful Joe
  - "Viewtiful World"
- ZZ / ZZB (14 December 2005)
  - "Walk into the light feat. Ken"
- Tamaki Nami / Don't Stay (23 April 2008)
  - "Gokigendaze!: Nothing but Something feat. Ken"
- m.c.A.T / Bomb a Head (21 November 1993) Theme of Tenjho Tenge
