= Hitoe Arakaki =

Japanese singer (born 1981)

Hitoe
- Born: 7 April 1981 (age 45); Yaese, Okinawa, Japan
- Genres: Pop; R&B
- Occupation: Singer
- Instruments: Vocals; drums; saxophone
- Years active: 1996–2003; 2009–present
- Labels: Toy's Factory; Avex Trax
- Formerly of: Speed

Hitoe Arakaki (新垣 仁絵, Arakaki Hitoe; born 7 April 1981) is a Japanese singer. She was the oldest member of the Japanese pop group Speed, which disbanded in 2000 and reformed in 2009. She was born in Okinawa, Japan, and is also known purely by her first name, Hitoe.

In 1999, Arakaki released her first solo single, "Inori", which topped the Oricon charts at No.2. In December 2002, she released her second single, "I Got You", and the album I'll Do It My Way. Besides "Inori", all tracks on the album were co-written by her. In February 2003, she released her third single, "I'll Do It My Way".

== Discography ==
=== Singles ===
- Inori (1999)
- I Got You (2002)
- I'll Do It My Way (2003)

=== Albums ===
- I'll Do It My Way (2002)
