= Hiroko Shimabukuro =

Japanese singer

Hiroko Shimabukuro 島袋 寛子
- Born: 7 April 1984 (age 42); Ginowan, Okinawa, Japan
- Genres: Pop; R&B
- Occupations: Singer; dancer
- Instrument: Vocals
- Years active: 1996–present
- Label: Sonic Groove
- Website: hiroko.jp.net

Hiroko Shimabukuro (島袋 寛子, Shimabukuro Hiroko; born 7 April 1984), best known mononymously as hiro, is a Japanese singer. She debuted as a member of the popular girl group Speed in 1996. In 1998, hiro released her first solo song, "Mitsumete Itai", as a B-side to Speed's single "All My True Love". She made her official solo debut in 1999 with the single "As Time Goes By", which sold 800,000 copies in Japan. In 2022 she released her fourth studio album called "0".

== Charting and sales ==
Her first album, Brilliant charted in Japan at number 4 for five weeks, selling 400,000 copies. Her second album, Naked and True, reached number 1, and she released a best singles album that charted in the top 10.

In August 2004, hiro released an all-English jazz album under the name of Coco d'Or. Her single "Hikari no naka de" was featured on the soundtrack to the movie Devilman. A year later, she released another song, "Clover", tied to anime Black Jack, selling 20,000 copies. Her two CDs released in 2006 sold considerably less, "Hero" selling 7,000 copies and "Itsuka Futari de" 9,000.

== Performances ==
She performed in the United States at Seattle's Sakura-Con in April 2004.

== Personal life ==
Shimabukuro married actor Saotome Yuki on February 12, 2018. They divorced on January 31, 2023.

Shimabukuro is a radio host for "Ii ne! Okinawa!" 『いいね!Okinawa!』every Saturday at 12:25 p.m. for FM-Okinawa.

On January 31, 2023, Shimabukuro Hiroko and stage actor Saotome Yuki took to their Instagram accounts to announce their divorce. According to reports, the two filed for divorce on the 30th.

== Discography ==
=== Albums ===
- Brilliant, 2001. Number 2, 7 weeks, 430,000 copies
- Naked and True, 2002. Number 2, 7 weeks, 236,000 copies
- 寛 シングル・コレクション (Regular Edition), 2006. (hiro Singles Collection) Number 7, 6 weeks, 47,000 copies
- 私の沖縄, 2013. (Watashi no Okinawa) Number 13, 4 weeks,
- 0, 2022.

=== Albums (As Coco d'Or) ===
- Coco d'Or, 2004.
- Coco d'Or Parfait, 2005.
- Coco d'Or 2, 2006.
- The Winter Selection, 2010.
- Coco d'Or 3, 2011.

=== Singles ===
- As Times Goes By, 1999. Number 2, 13 weeks, 812,020 copies
- Bright Daylight, 2000. Number 2, 10 weeks, 427,770 copies
- Treasure, 2000. Number 2, 15 weeks, 602,390 copies
- Your Innocence, 2001. Number 3, 9 weeks, 227,970 copies
- Confession, 2001. Number 3, 9 weeks, 172,180 copies
- Love You, 2002. Number 3, 5weeks, 103,750 copies
- Eternal Place, 2002. Number 2, 7 weeks, 85,430 copies
- Notice my mind, 2002. Number 8, 4 weeks, 37,600 copies
- Baby Don't Cry, 2003. Number 9, 6 weeks, 38,056 copies
- 愛が泣いてる, 2003. (Ai ga Naiteru) Number 12, 6 weeks, 29,546 copies
- 光の中で, 2004. (Hikari no Naka de) Number 12, 7 weeks, 28,954 copies
- Clover, 2005. Number 18, 5 weeks, 20,358 copies
- ヒーロー☆, 2006. (Hero) Number 40, 3 weeks, 7,000 copies
- I will take you/いつか二人で, 2006. (I will take you/Itsuka futari de) Number 18, 7 weeks, 20,000 copies
- 童神, 2013. (Warabigami)

=== Singles (As ERIHIRO) ===
- Stars, 2015.

=== Vinyls ===
- Baby don't cry, 2003.
- 愛が泣いてる, 2003. (Ai ga Naiteru)
- Coco d'Or (Coco d'Or), 2004.
- Coco d'Or 2 (Coco d'Or), 2006.

=== Digital Singles ===
- The Christmas Song (Coco d'Or), 2010.
- Something Great, 2021.
- Water Mirror, 2022.

=== Video Releases ===
- BRILLIANT ON FILMS, 2001.
- Naked and True Clips, 2003.
- 寛 クリップ・コレクション, 2006. (hiro Clip Collection)

=== Photobooks ===
- Hiroko Shimabukuro Days, 2002

=== Box Sets ===
- 寛 スペシャル・ボックス, (hiro Special Box), 2006. Number 26, 2 weeks, 9,000 copies (Limited Release Edition)
- UTAUTAI, 2023. (Limited Release)

=== Compilations / Other ===
- SPEED- ALL MY TRUE LOVE (#2 "Mitsumetetai"), 1998.
- FLOWER FESTIVAL 〜VISION FACTORY presents (#1 "Sakura"), 2008.
- Aku Yu Tribute Special Songs ~Asahi no Youni~ (#2 "Tsukami Sokoneta Shiawase ni"), 2017.
- Sungje - Yume no Kaika ~Yume ga Yume de Owaranaiyoni~ (#5 "Oyasumi" with Shimabukuro Hiroko), 2018.

=== Movies ===
- Andromedia, 1998, as Mai.
- Backdancers!, September 2006, as Yoshika.
