= Starting Over (Speed album) =

Studio album by Speed
- Released: May 21, 1997
- Recorded: 1996–1997
- Genres: J-pop; dance-pop; R&B
- Length: 52:05
- Label: Toy's Factory
- Producer: Hiromasa Ijichi

Speed chronology
Starting Over (1997)	Rise (1998)

Starting Over Is Japanese J-pop girlband Speed's debut studio album released on May 21, 1997. It contains three singles: "Body & Soul", "Steady" and "Go! Go! Heaven" respectively. The album was hugely successful entering the Oricon Albums Charts weekly charts at number 1 for three consecutive weeks.

== Track listing ==
1. Walk This Way
2. Body & Soul
3. Luv Vibration
4. STEADY
5. RAKUGAKI
6. Sayonara wa ame no hi (サヨナラは雨の日…)
7. Go! Go! Heaven
8. I Remember
9. Kiwi Love
10. Happy Together
11. Starting Over
12. Starting Over: Walk This Way (Reprise)

== Charts ==
Chart (1997)	Peak position
Japanese Albums (Oricon)	1

== Certifications ==
Certifications for Starting Over
Region	Certification	Certified units/sales
Japan (RIAJ)	2× Million	2,000,000^{^}
^{^} Shipments figures based on certification alone.
