= Speed (Japanese band) =

Japanese female vocal/dance group

- Origin: Okinawa, Japan
- Genres: J-pop; dance; R&B; hip hop
- Years active: 1995–2001; 2003; 2008–2012
- Labels: Toy's Factory (1995–2001); Sonic Groove (2003–2012)
- Past members: Hitoe Arakaki; Takako Uehara; Eriko Imai; Hiroko Shimabukuro
- Website: www.avexnet.or.jp/speed/ www.visionfactory.jp/artist/speed/

Speed (stylized in all caps) was a Japanese female vocal/dance group comprising Hiroko Shimabukuro, Eriko Imai, Takako Uehara and Hitoe Arakaki. All four members are former students of the Okinawa Actors School which also trained popular artists Namie Amuro and MAX.

Speed made their major label debut on August 5, 1996, and became an immediate success. They would eventually become the most successful girl group anywhere in Asia with sales of over 20 million singles and albums in just three years and eight months. They disbanded on March 31, 2000, to pursue solo careers and to study.

Following their disbandment, the group reunited several times for charity, but on August 20, 2008, they officially announced plans to reunite permanently. They made their comeback on November 12, 2008, with the single "Ashita no Sora."

== History ==
=== 1995–1997: Early success ===
The performers who would become Speed met at the Okinawa Actors School and formed a group containing seven to nine rotating members. The group was trimmed down to four when Nippon Television show Yoru mo Hippare (Night of the Hit Parade) requested them to come to Tokyo to perform in December 1995.

Introduced as the younger sisters of Namie Amuro, they requested the audience to give the band a name. Rejecting suggestions such as "The Habus and Mongooses," "Ryukyu Girls" and "Okinawa Girls," the quartet unanimously decided on "Speed."

Unlike most artists from the Okinawa Actors School which were signed to the Avex record label, Speed were signed up by Toy's Factory, which the group stated allowed them more creative freedom and expression. Their sole producer during their time together was Hiromasa Ijichi and the members hoped to emulate U.S. R&B group TLC.

Upon forming, Speed recorded a few songs, however "Body & Soul" was chosen to be their debut single. The video for the song was filmed in San Francisco and Los Angeles, and the single sold an impressive total of over 638,000 copies. "Body & Soul" was also Speed's longest charting song, lingering in the charts for 31 weeks.

Body & Soul was quickly followed up by the ballad single "Steady" which was their first million-selling single (1.27 million copies). Following Steady, Speed decided to go with a more upbeat song and released "Go! Go! Heaven". The video for the song was filmed on location in New York and Miami. The song sold over 665,000 copies and became the group's first single to hit No.1 on Japan's Oricon weekly charts. Following "Go Go Heaven", Speed released their debut album Starting Over. The album contained a mix of upbeat songs mixed with soft ballads. Their debut album became their first No.1 album on the Oricon charts. The album's third track, "Luv Vibration", has a music video.

After the release of Starting Over, Speed followed on with their upbeat genre and released the single "Wake Me Up!". The video for the song was filmed on location in the Philippines and sold approximately 671,000 copies (total shipment: 890,000) when it was released. It was also during this time that Speed decided to have their debut concert. The concert titled 'Speed – First Live' was staged outdoors on location in Odaiba and featured an impressive stage with pyrotechnics and acrobatic stunts.

=== 1997–1998: Rise to the top ===
In October 1997, they released "White Love". Their style saw a change from dance music to a ballad for the single. The Winter-themed single became the smash hit single of that year's holiday period. By the time the single exited the charts it had already sold an impressive 1.845 million copies. After White Love, Speed continued on with their more mature style and released the anthem-like song "My Graduation". The single sold 1.475 million copies and became famous as Japan's highest-selling single on the subject of graduation.

After "My Graduation", Speed finally released their highly anticipated second album Rise. Rise introduced a change in their musical style and took on a much more futuristic sound compared to their original album. Apparently, the single "Wake Me Up!" received a remix just so it could fit in more appropriately with the other tracks on the album. Rise was highly successful, entering the Oricon chart in the top spot and sold over two million copies.

After Rise, Speed decided to give acting a try with the members starring in the Takashi Miike directed Sci-Fi thriller Andromedia. To accompany Andromedia, they recorded a theme track titled "Alive". The single was shot in location in Hawaii and became one of Speed's most popular singles. Despite the single's popularity, the song slightly failed to cross the 1 million mark in sales (total 967,000 copies).

Following Andromedia and "Alive", Speed began the Rise Tour. They began their tour first by visiting most of the major cities throughout Japan. All of their concerts immediately sold out. They followed up their Japanese tour with the Dome Tour (Tokyo Dome, Nagoya Dome, Osaka Dome, and Fukuoka Dome). Speed are the only female group in J-Pop to achieve the Dome Tour and had an average age of 15.25 at the time, thus they also hold the record for the youngest performers to complete the feat.

During the Dome tours Speed released another single titled "All My True Love", a fast upbeat song shot on location in the Grand Canyon, Arizona. It was considered a turning point for Speed as it contained the first official solo tracks sung by the two members, Hiroko and Eriko. Hiroko's song was titled Mitsumete Itai and Eriko's Tsumetaku Shinaide (under the name, 'Eriko with Crunch', a dance troupe). Both songs also contained their solo music videos shot in Universal Studios, Hollywood. The single was also Speed's first Maxi single to be released on a regular 5" CD, all previous singles having been released on the fashionable 3" Mini CD single format. The single topped the charts again and went on to sell over 1.22 million copies.

After the release of "All My True Love", Speed followed up by releasing their greatest-hits album: Moment, which topped the charts and shipped over 2.3 million units. Moment contained all of Speed's released singles at that time along with a couple of popular album and single tracks. The album also contained a critically acclaimed Christmas version of the single "White Love" and a hidden instrumental track of the song. The first print edition of the album came with flip book showing their trademark dance moves. Three random versions were available – "Body & Soul", "White Love", and "My Graduation".

=== 1999: Solo projects ===
Following Moment, Speed released the single "Precious Time". The single's video was shot on location in Los Angeles and the single itself also featured a coupling track to celebrate the cartoon character Doraemon's 40th anniversary. The single went on to sell over 623,000 copies.

Shortly after the release of "Precious Time", news broke that Takako of the group will be releasing a solo single in March. More surprisingly, the producer will not be Hiromasa Ijichi, but instead Ryuichi Kawamura of Luna Sea. Takako's debut single "My First Love" was highly anticipated and came in at number 1, selling over 530,000 copies. The video for the single was shot on location in Hawaii.

Following Takako's solo debut, it was revealed that another Speed member, Hitoe would also be releasing a solo single. For her debut Hitoe decided to go with a much more adult look, appearing in her video wearing mini skirt & bikini with a short coat. The single titled "Inori" was more RnB in nature and showcased Hitoe's impressive dance moves. In fact for the single, Hitoe adopted the pseudonym Hitoe's 57 Move (57 meaning Go-Na – gonna in Japanese). Hence Hitoe's 57 Move. The shock value of her image may have worked against her as Hitoe's debut single sold approximately 230,000 copies – nonetheless an impressive figure for a debut single.

After "Inori", Speed was back on track again and released another upbeat maxi single, this time titled "Breakin' Out the Morning". The single also contained another solo track by Eriko with Crunch titled – "Everyday, Be With You". The single sold over 582,000 copies and at the time was actually Speed's worst selling single. It was also the first single by Speed which was not an original release but a cover.

Following Breakin' Out to the Morning, the time came for Hiroko to show case her solo talents. Her single titled "As Time Goes By" was produced by Hiromasa Ijichi and was the theme song of the drama series Tengoku no Kiss. The video for the single was shot on location in New York (mainly Brooklyn). "As Time Goes By" was an instant hit, high charting at no. 2 selling close to 900,000 copies.

After Hiro's single, Takako released her second single titled: "Come Close to Me". The single was again produced by Ryuichi Kawamura and sold over 200,000 copies.

=== 2000: Disbandment ===
In October 1999, Speed announced that they would disband. The news shocked many fans and artists alike as they appeared to be breaking up at the peak of their career. The reason offered was that they have grown up and would like to pursue their own solo paths and interests. The date announced for the disbandment was the following year – March 31, 2000. This date was chosen because it was the time when the Sakura would bloom in Japan, thus signaling new life.

Following the news, on November 3, 1999, Speed released their final single titled "Long Way Home", which had an R&B vibe to it. The single did not debut at no. 1 on the Oricon charts despite first week sales of over 366,000 copies, due to competition from boy-band Arashi's debut single "Arashi" which sold 557,000 copies. Long Way Home eventually sold over 613,000 copies.

Speed then released their final album Carry On My Way containing a variety of tracks from soft-tone ballads to R&B songs and even a couple of rock songs. Overall the album sold 880,000 copies. Their summer tour Speed Tour 1999 Real Life visited arenas and halls before a final dome tour, titled Speed Dome Tour 1999 Real Life, took in 6 shows with their very final concert being held in the Fukuoka Dome on Christmas Day.

A few weeks prior to the disbandment of Speed, hiro release her 2nd single "Bright Daylight" and Eriko finally released her own solo CD under the stage name Eriko with Crunch. Eriko's single titled "Red Beat of My Life" was a fast-paced song produced by Hiromasa Ijichi with a video filmed in New Mexico, USA. The single debuted at no. 3 and sold over 240,000 copies.

On March 29, 2000, Speed released two greatest-hits albums titled Speed the Memorial Best 1335days Dear Friends 1 and Speed the Memorial Best 1335days Dear Friends 2. The albums contained all their hit singles along with previously unreleased tracks and other popular songs from their single b-sides and albums. Dear Friends 2 contained their break-up theme song "April." The albums also contained a program that when installed displayed small virtual images of the members on a computer screen.

On 31 March 2000, Speed attended Music Station and performed a final 30-minute mini-live singing a few of their hit songs. The last song they sang together was "Starting Over", in which Takako cried during singing.

=== 2001–2007: Post-break-up and reunions ===
On October 6, 2001, Speed held a one-night outdoor live concert at Kobe Awaji for an earthquake charity, attracting more than 24,000 fans. The concert featured past Speed hits, solo songs from individual members and a new single One More Dream.

Subsequently, One More Dream and a live recording album of the concert Speed Memorial Live "One More Dream" + Remix were released on December 12 and December 19 respectively. After being under Toy's Factory record label for 6 years, Speed officially switched to Avex's sub-label, Sonic Groove, at the end of 2001.

On December 2, 2001, all Speed members attended the wedding of their long-time producer Hiromasa Ijichi at which they sang Two of Us from their final studio album, Carry On My Way

On July 17, 2002, all Speed members attended TV Asahi's Suisupe! together as solo artists.

On April 8, 2003, Speed held a press conference in which they announced they would be temporarily reuniting for another charity Save the Children. The charity aims to raise money for unfortunate children in Asia. The temporary reunion lasted until 31 December of the same year. During this period, Speed released their 13th single, Be My Love on 27 August 2003 and all of their past VHS releases to DVD formats, which included Speed Spirits 1 and 2, and their 3 concerts. From 29 September to 14 November, Speed held 19 "Speed Save the Children Live 2003" nationwide concerts.

On 27 November 2003, Speed released their 14th single Walking in the Rain / Stars to Shine Again and 4th studio album Bridge. This was also the first single that was not produced by Hiromasa Ijichi.

On Christmas Day 2003, Speed released a DVD of their charity concert, Speed Save the Children Live 2003 which also included the promotional videos of Be My Love and Walking in the Rain. During the temporary reunion, Speed visited Vietnam to get to know more about the living situations of children over there.

Speed attended their last TV program Japan Record Awards 2003 on 31 December 2003, to receive a special award before ending their status as ambassadors of Save the Children. The charity raised approximately 146,445,469 yen during this period.

On January 9, 2004, Speed released a photo book Bridge consisting of photographs from this temporary reunion. On 11 February 2004, Speed released a live album Best Hits Live: Save the Children Speed Live 2003.

On 1 August 2006, Toy's Factory opened a Speed 10th anniversary website. On 5 August 2008, the 12th Anniversary of Speed, digital downloads became available for all the group's songs.

=== 2008: Full return of Speed ===
On 19 August, breaking news was released of all four members of Speed attending the annual NTV charity show named 24 Hour Television on 30 and 31 August, a 3rd public reunion after 4 years and 8 months. The appearance was inspired by Eriko Imai who announced that her son suffered from a hearing disability and that she hoped to convey the songs of Speed to her son somehow. Speed performed a medley of White Love, Steady, All My True Love, Alive & Body & Soul, nine years since they last hosted 24 Hour Television in 1999. After the appearance, Speed's management company received many calls asking whether Speed would reform fully.

On 23 September, an official statement was made by Speed's management company that they would be back officially and permanently, and a new, 15th, single was announced to be released on 12 November 2008 titled Ashita no Sora (あしたの空) (Sky of Tomorrow).

=== 2009: New single, album and nationwide tour ===
On 1 January, Speed's new fanclub "Speed Way" was opened. Speed released their 16th single on May 27, 2009, titled S.P.D.

Speed won The Best Jeanist Award on 19 October, one of many bizarre end-of-year award shows commonly used to promote Japanese brands towards the end of the year.

Their 'best-of' album, Speedland: The Premium Best Re Tracks, released on their 13th Anniversary, 5 August, charted at number-two on the Oricon charts. One month after the release, Speed began a nationwide tour "Welcome to Speedland Speed Live 2009" which visited 10 cities with 16 shows. This was their first nationwide tour in six years. The tour ended on 1 November.

On 18 November, Speed released a photo-book titled "Welcome to Speedland" which recorded various stages of their tour. The live DVD was released on 30 December. Also on the same day, they received an award from The Japan Record Awards for "Speedland: The Premium Best Re Tracks"

=== 2010: Second nationwide tour after reunion ===
Soon after the end of the "Welcome to Speedland" tour, a new tour "Speed Live 2010: Glowing Sunflower" was announced on 1 February. The tour ran from 24 April to 16 July, visited 13 cities, and ran for 21 shows. The tour ended at Nippon Budokan and the DVD recording took place at the Osaka-jō Hall.

On 21 April, two days before the tour, Speed's 17th Single "Himawari: Growing Sunflower" was released. The single was again produced by their long-time producer, Ijichi Hiromasa. The single included a track "My Street Life" which was an extended, re-sung and re-arranged version of "Street Life" from their 2nd album "Rise".

During the tour, Speed gave a rare interview to English media, speaking to Metropolis about their comeback coming during a vastly different period of J-Pop than in their heyday, with no other mainstream girl-groups to speak of. In the interview, Shimabukuro stated that they the group were enjoying "starting all over again from zero... and considering what we want to do more this time.” Arakaki stated that "I made up my mind to continue being a member of Speed until I become an old lady."

On 1 September, Speed released their 18th single, a mid-tempo ballad titled "Yubiwa", produced by indie band "Octopus" (producer of GreeeeN, JIN, and Nishi-Ken). This was also the first time after their reunion that no choreography was given to their single PV.

On 2 September, Speed attended a press conference for "Aeon Heat Fact," to announce that they would be endorsing the woman's clothing brand. This was their first CM in 7 years and featured their 19th single "Let's Heat Up!". Two weeks later, on 24 November, the group released their live DVD "Speed Live 2010: Glowing Sunflower".

=== 2011~2012 ===
On 27 April 2011, Speed releases "Bible-Speed Best Clips", a compilation of their music videos.
On 10 August 2011, Speed released their 20th single "Little Dancer". The single included a track, "Pride", featuring Ohga.
On 3 September 2012, Speed announced a new album on their official website: "4 Colors" was to release on 14 November. The album would include 13 songs, 7 Single songs (from 2008 to 2011), "Pride", and 5 new songs. They disbanded again after Arakaki Hitoe didn't renew her contract.

== Discography ==
=== Studio albums ===
- 1997: Starting Over
- 1998: Rise
- 1999: Carry On My Way
- 2003: Bridge
- 2012: 4 Colors

=== Other albums ===
- 1998: Moment
- 2000: Speed the Memorial Best 1335days Dear Friends 1
- 2000: Speed the Memorial Best 1335days Dear Friends 2
- 2001: Speed Memorial Live "One More Dream" + Remix
- 2004: Best Hits Live: Save the Children Speed Live 2003
- 2009: Speedland: The Premium Best Re Tracks

=== Number-one singles ===
- 1997: "Go! Go! Heaven"
- 1997: "White Love"
- 1998: "My Graduation"
- 1998: "Alive"
- 1998: "All My True Love"

== See also ==
- List of best-selling music artists in Japan
- List of best-selling girl groups
