= W-inds discography =

w-inds. discography
- Studio albums: 16
- Compilation albums: 4
- Singles: 40
- Music videos: 50

The discography for the Japanese boy band w-inds. consists of 40 singles and 16 studio albums since their major label debut in 2001.

== Albums ==
=== Studio albums ===
Title	Details	Peak chart positions		Sales	Certifications
Title	Details	JPN	TWN	Sales	Certifications
1st Message	Released: December 26, 2001; Label: Pony Canyon; Formats: CD	1	—	370,300	RIAJ (phy.): Platinum
The System of Alive	Released: December 17, 2002; Label: Pony Canyon; Formats: CD	3	—	213,061	RIAJ (phy.): Gold
Prime of Life	Released: December 17, 2003; Label: Pony Canyon; Formats: CD	5	—	153,465	RIAJ (phy.): Gold
Ageha	Released: June 1, 2005; Label: Pony Canyon; Formats: CD	1	—	96,826	RIAJ (phy.): Gold
Thanks	Released: March 15, 2006; Label: Pony Canyon; Formats: CD	4	1	55,574	
Journey	Released: March 7, 2007; Label: Pony Canyon; Formats: CD	8	4	33,420	
Seventh Ave.	Released: July 2, 2008; Label: Pony Canyon; Formats: CD	10	—	29,956	
Another World	Released: March 10, 2010; Label: Pony Canyon; Formats: CD	7	4	19,708	
Move Like This	Released: July 4, 2012; Label: Pony Canyon; Formats: CD	4	—	22,226 (first week)	
Timeless	Released: July 9, 2014; Label: Pony Canyon; Formats: CD	8	—	16,250	
Blue Blood	Released: July 8, 2015; Label: Pony Canyon; Formats: CD	11	—	10,203 (first week)	
Invisible	Released: March 15, 2017; Label: Pony Canyon; Formats: CD, digital download	4	—	12,243 (first week)	
100	Released: July 4, 2018; Label: Pony Canyon; Formats: CD, digital download	11	—	6,529 (first week)	
20XX: We Are	Released: November 24, 2021; Label: Pony Canyon; Formats: CD, digital download	4	—	4,866 (first week)	
Beyond	Released: March 14, 2023; Label: Pony Canyon; Formats: CD, digital download	17	—		
Winderlust	Released: March 26, 2025; Label: Pony Canyon; Formats: CD, digital download	13	—	5,711 (first week)	

=== Compilation albums ===
Title	Details	Peak chart positions	Sales	Certifications
Title	Details	JPN	Sales	Certifications
W-inds BesTracks	Released: July 14, 2004; Label: Pony Canyon; Formats: CD	2	161,169	RIAJ (phy.): Gold
W-inds Single Collection Best Eleven	Released: January 1, 2008; Label: Pony Canyon; Formats: CD	19	28,962	
W-inds 10th Anniversary Best Album: We Dance For Everyone	Released: June 22, 2011; Label: Pony Canyon; Formats: CD	9		
W-inds 10th Anniversary Best Album: We Sing For You	Released: June 22, 2011; Label: Pony Canyon; Formats: CD	10		

=== Remix albums ===
Title	Details	Peak chart positions	Sales
Title	Details	JPN	Sales
Buddies (with Lead and Flame)	Released: March 19, 2003; Label: Pony Canyon; Formats: CD	13	107,810

== Singles ==
=== As lead artist ===
Title	Year	Peak chart positions				Sales	Certifications	Album
Title	Year	JPN			TWN	Sales	Certifications	Album
Title	Year	Oricon Weekly	Oricon Yearly	Hot 100	Combo Weekly	Sales	Certifications	Album
"Forever Memories"	2001	12	91			216,590	RIAJ (phy.): Gold	1st Message
"Feel the Fate"	2001	7	99			203,860	RIAJ (phy.): Gold	1st Message
"Paradox"	2001	3	97			224,880	RIAJ (phy.): Gold	1st Message
"Try Your Emotion"	2002	2	70			177,250	RIAJ (phy.): Gold	The System of Alive
"Another Days"	2002	1	86			145,790	RIAJ (phy.): Gold	The System of Alive
"Because of You"	2002	1	90			139,620	RIAJ (phy.): Gold	The System of Alive
"New Paradise"	2002	2				115,751		The System of Alive
"Super Lover (I Need You Tonight)"	2003	1	84			119,167	RIAJ (phy.): Gold	Prime of Life
"Love is Message"	2003	2				98,486	RIAJ (phy.): Gold	Prime of Life
"Long Road"	2003	1				97,529	RIAJ (phy.): Gold	Prime of Life
"Pieces"	2004	2				80,198	RIAJ (phy.): Gold	Ageha
"Kirei da" (キレイだ)	2004	4				87,548	RIAJ (phy.): Gold	Ageha
"Shiki" (四季)	2004	2	100			100,388	RIAJ (phy.): Gold	Ageha
"Yume no Basho e" (夢の場所へ)	2005	2	108			97,724	RIAJ (phy.): Gold	Ageha
"Kawariyuku Sora" (変わりゆく空)	2005	6	139			73,064	RIAJ (phy.): Gold	Ageha
"Izayoi no Tsuki" (十六夜の月)	2005	3	168			59,537		Thanks
"Yakusoku no Kakera" (約束のカケラ)	2005	6				56,801		Thanks
"It's in the Stars"	2006	6	162			51,105		Thanks
"Trial"	2006	3				43,369		Journey
"Boogie Woogie 66" (ブギウギ66)	2006	5				43,675		Journey
"Hanamuke" (ハナムケ)	2007	5				41,148		Journey
"Love is the Greatest Thing"	2007	4				34,416		Seventh Ave.
"Beautiful Life"	2007	10				28,205		Seventh Ave.
"Ame ato" (アメあと)	2008	7				33,087		Seventh Ave.
"Everyday/Can't Get Back"	2008	2	128	3	4	60,075		Another World
"Rain Is Fallin'/Hybrid Dream" (featuring G-Dragon)	2009	2				50,563		Another World
"New World/Truth (Saigo no Shinjitsu)"	2009	2		3		43,786		Another World
"Addicted to Love"	2010	3		7		38,353		Move Like This
"Be As One/Let's Get It On"	2011	4		16		38,061		Move Like This
"You & I"	2011	9		17	7			Move Like This
"Fly High"	2012	5		6	8	44,999		Move Like This
"A Little Bit"	2013	4		6		38,836		Timeless
"Yume de Aeru ni (Sometimes I Cry)" (夢で逢えるのに〜Sometimes I Cry〜)	2014	7		19		31,325		Timeless
"Fantasy"	2015	4		14		36,512		Blue Blood
"In Love With the Music"	2015	6		10				Blue Blood
"Boom Word Up"	2016	3		8				Invisible
"Backstage"	2016	5		16				Invisible
"We Don't Need To Talk Anymore"	2017	4						Invisible
"Time Has Gone"	2017	4						100
"Dirty Talk"	2018	10		16				100
"Get Down"	2019	16						20XX: We Are
"DoU"	2020	25				5,127		20XX: We Are

=== As featured artist ===
Title	Year	Peak chart positions	Sales	Album
Title	Year	JPN	Sales	Album
"World Needs Love" (with Lead, Flame, and Folder 5 as Earth Harmony)	2002			Non-album single

=== Promotional singles ===
Title	Year	Peak chart positions	Sales	Album
Title	Year	JPN	Sales	Album
"W-inds Single Mega-Mix"	2007	13	18,461	Non-album single

== Guest appearances ==
List of non-single guest appearances, with other performing artists, showing year released and album name
Title	Year	Other artist(s)	Album
"Storytelling"	2007	None	Christmas Harmony: Vision Factory Presents
"Lost & Found" (featuring Keita (w-inds.))	2017	Taeil	Block B Project-1
"Stepping on the Fire"	2018	Radio Fish	Radio Fish 2017-2018 Tour: Phalanx

== Other charted songs ==
Title	Year	Peak chart positions		Sales	Album
Title	Year	JPN		Sales	Album
Title	Year	Oricon Weekly	Hot 100	Sales	Album
"Listen to the Rain"	2012		80		Move Like This

== Videography ==
=== Video albums ===
Title	Details	Peak chart positions	Sales
Title	Details	JPN	Sales
W-inds: Works. vol. 1	Released: March 20, 2002; Label: Pony Canyon; Formats: DVD		
W-inds 1st Live Tour: 1st Message	Released: October 17, 2002; Label: Pony Canyon; Formats: DVD		
W-inds: Works vol. 2	Released: April 23, 2003; Label: Pony Canyon; Formats: DVD		21,247
W-inds: The System of Alive Tour 2003	Released: November 6, 2003; Label: Pony Canyon; Formats: DVD		22,611
W-inds: Works vol. 3	Released: April 21, 2004; Label: Pony Canyon; Formats: DVD		31,076
W-inds: Prime of Life Tour 2004	Released: December 15, 2004; Label: Pony Canyon; Formats: DVD		51,285
W-inds: Works vol. 4	Released: July 20, 2005; Label: Pony Canyon; Formats: DVD		24,999
W-inds Live Tour 2005: Ageha	Released: December 15, 2005; Label: Pony Canyon; Formats: DVD		30,486
W-inds: Works vol. 5	Released: September 20, 2006; Label: Pony Canyon; Formats: DVD		22,363
W-inds Live Tour 2006: Thanks	Released: December 20, 2006; Label: Pony Canyon; Formats: DVD		28,020
W-inds: Works vol. 6	Released: September 9, 2007; Label: Pony Canyon; Formats: DVD		
W-inds Live Tour 2007: Journey	Released: December 19, 2007; Label: Pony Canyon; Formats: DVD		
W-inds Live Tour 2008: Seventh Ave.	Released: December 17, 2008; Label: Pony Canyon; Formats: DVD		
W-inds: Works Best	Released: April 3, 2009; Label: Pony Canyon; Formats: DVD		
W-inds Live Tour 2009: Sweet Fantasy in Hong Kong	Released: February 10, 2010; Label: Pony Canyon; Formats: DVD		
W-inds Live Tour 2010: Another World	Released: December 22, 2010; Label: Pony Canyon; Formats: DVD		
W-inds 10th Anniversary: Three Fourteen	Released: March 11, 2011; Label: Pony Canyon; Formats: DVD		
W-inds 10th Anniversary: Three Fourteen at Nippon Budokan	Released: October 19, 2011; Label: Pony Canyon; Formats: DVD		
W-inds Best Live Tour 2011 Final at Nippon Budokan	Released: March 14, 2012; Label: Pony Canyon; Formats: DVD		
W-inds Live Tour: Awake at Nippon Budokan	Released: March 19, 2014; Label: Pony Canyon; Formats: DVD		
W-inds Live Tour 2014: Timeless	Released: December 17, 2014; Label: Pony Canyon; Formats: DVD		
W-inds: Works vol. 7	Released: March 18, 2015; Label: Pony Canyon; Formats: DVD, Blu-ray		
W-inds Live Tour 2015: Blue Blood	Released: December 23, 2015; Label: Pony Canyon; Formats: DVD, Blu-ray		
W-inds 15th Anniversary Live	Released: July 13, 2016; Label: Pony Canyon; Formats: DVD, Blu-ray		
W-inds 15th Anniversary Live Tour 2016: Forever Memories	Released: December 28, 2016; Label: Pony Canyon; Formats: DVD, Blu-ray		

=== Music videos ===
Title	Year	Notes	Ref.
"Forever Memories"	2001	—	—
"Feel the Fate"	2001	—	—
"Paradox"	2001	—	—
"Try Your Emotion"	2002	—	—
"Another Days"	2002	—	—
"World Needs Love" (with Lead, Flame, and Folder 5 as Earth Harmony)	2002	—	—
"Because of You"	2002	—	—
"New Paradise"	2002	—	—
"Super Lover (I Need You Tonight)"	2003	—	—
"Love is Message"	2003	—	—
"Long Road"	2003	—	—
"Pieces"	2004	—	—
"Kirei da" (キレイだ)	2004	—	—
"Shiki" (四季)	2004	—	—
"Yume no Basho e" (夢の場所へ)	2005	—	—
"Kawariyuku Sora" (変わりゆく空)	2005	—	—
"Izayoi no Tsuki" (十六夜の月)	2005	—	—
"Yakusoku no Kakera" (約束のカケラ)	2005	—	—
"It's in the Stars"	2006	—	—
"Trial"	2006	—	—
"Boogie Woogie 66" (ブギウギ66)	2006	—	—
"Hanamuke" (ハナムケ)	2007	—	—
"Love is the Greatest Thing"	2007	—	—
"Beautiful Life"	2007	—	—
"Ame ato" (アメあと)	2008	—	—
"Everyday"	2008	—	—
"Can't Get Back"	2008	—	—
"Rain is Fallin'" (featuring G-Dragon)	2009	—	—
"Hybrid Dream"	2009	—	—
"New World"	2009	—	—
"Truth (Saigo no Shinjitsu)"	2009	—	—
"Addicted to Love"	2010	—	—
"Be As One"	2011	—	—
"Let's Get It On"	2011	—	—
"You & I"	2011	—	—
"Fly High"	2012	—	—
"Listen to the Rain"	2012	—	—
"A Little Bit"	2013	—	—
"Yume de Aeru ni (Sometimes I Cry)" (夢で逢えるのに〜Sometimes I Cry〜)	2014	—	—
"Make You Mine"	2014	—	—
"Fantasy"	2015	—	—
"In Love With the Music"	2015	—	—
"Boom Word Up"	2016	—	—
"Backstage"	2016	—	—
"We Don't Need To Talk Anymore"	2017	—	—
"Lost & Found" (Taeil featuring Keita (w-inds.))	2017	—	—
"Time Has Gone"	2017	—	—
"Stepping on the Fire" (Radio Fish featuring w-inds.)	2018	—	—
"Dirty Talk"	2018	—	—
"Temporary"	2018	—	—

== Other discography ==
=== DVDs ===
1. "Private of W-inds" (6 February 2002) - ??? copies sold
