= 20XX: We Are =

20XX "We Are"

Studio album by w-inds
- Released: November 24, 2021
- Recorded: 2021
- Genres: Hip hop, pop, R&B, dance
- Labels: Flight Master; CD (PCCA-06085); CD+DVD (PCCA-06084); CD+Blu-ray (PCCA-06083)

W-inds chronology
100 (2018)	20XX "We Are" (2021)	Beyond (2023)

Singles from 20XX "We Are"
- 1. "Get Down" Released: July 31, 2019; 2. "DoU" Released: January 22, 2020; 3. "Beautiful Now" Released: December 2, 2020; 4. "Strip" Released: September 24, 2021; 5. "Little" Released: October 22, 2021

20XX: We Are (stylized as 20XX "We are") is the fourteenth studio album released by the Japanese hip-hop group w-inds, released on November 24, 2021. It reached No. 18 on the Oricon charts.

The album included their physical singles "Get Down" and "DoU", as well as their digital singles "Beautiful Now", "Strip" and "Little."

20XX "We Are" was released in three separate editions: a CD only edition, CD+DVD and CD+Blu-ray edition. The two latter editions housed the music video for "Strip" and the making of the album.

== Information ==
20XX "We Are" is a studio album released by w-inds, released three years after their previous album 100, and first album with the new two-member group. The album debuted at No. 4 on the Oricon Albums Charts and took the No. 18 spot for the first week. It remained on the charts for two consecutive weeks.

The album was released in five editions: a standard CD containing ten musical tracks; a CD+DVD/Blu-ray edition, both which housed the music video for "Strip" and a documentary for the album; and a limited 2CD+DVD/Blu-ray+Photobook, which carried 20XX The Best Instrumental on the second disc. With the exception of the CD only, all editions were given a limited release that contained a making of the albums' covers. The CD included their singles Get Down and DoU. Also included were their digital singles "Beautiful Now," "Strip," and "Little," and their collaboration with fellow label-mates Da Pump and Lead for "The Christmas Song."

All of the songs were produced by lead vocalist Keita Tachibana.

== Promotional activities ==
Prior to the album's release, the group released five singles, two which were physical and three that were digital.

Get Down was the forty-first single released by w-inds, and was their first and only of 2019, released on July 31. It took No. 16 on the Oricon Singles Charts for the first week and remained on the charts for eight weeks. It was released in two formats, a CD only and a limited CD+DVD edition. The CD contained the title track and the coupling tracks "Take it Slow" and "Femme Fatale," while the limited CD+DVD omitted "Femme Fatale" on the CD, but carried the music video and making video for "Get Down."

DoU was their forty-second single and was released on January 22, 2020, becoming their first single of 2020. It took No. 25 on Oricon for its first week and remained on the charts for three weeks. Like their previous single, it was released in CD only and a limited CD+DVD edition. The CD contained the title track and the coupling tracks "Candy" and "We Don’t Need To Talk Anymore Remix feat. SKY-HI." The DVD housed the music video for "DoU," along with the making video.

"Beautiful Now" was their first digital single for the album, released on December 2, 2020. It was their first song released since Ryuichi Ogata's departure in June of that year. On December 4, a music video for the song was released on w-inds' official YouTube. Their second digital single, "Strip", was released on September 24, 2021. A music video accompanied the song's release on the group's official YouTube on the same day. "Little" was their final digital single for the album, released on October 22, 2021. To aid in promotion, an official lyric video was released on their official YouTube the day before on October 21.

The group collaborated with fellow label-mates Da Pump and Lead for track 7, "The Christmas Song." The music video was released on the group's official YouTube the day after the album's release on November 25.

== Track listing ==
- All songs produced by Keita Tachibana

CD1
No.	Title	Lyrics	Music	Length
1.	"Strip"	Keita Tachibana	Keita Tachibana • JUNE	2:53
2.	"Exit"	Keita Tachibana	Keita Tachibana • JUNE	3:20
3.	"With You"	Keita Tachibana	Keita Tachibana • JUNE	3:08
4.	"Show Me Your Love"	Keita Tachibana	Keita Tachibana • JUNE	2:58
5.	"Little"	Keita Tachibana	Keita Tachibana • JUNE	4:09
6.	"Beautiful Now"	Keita Tachibana • Ryohei Chiba	Keita Tachibana • JUNE	3:23
7.	"The Christmas Song" (feat. DA PUMP and Lead)	ISSA • KIMI • Shinya Taniuchi • Keita Furuya • Akira Kagimoto • Ryohei Chiba • Keita Tachibana	ISSA • KIMI • Shinya Taniuchi • Keita Furuya • Akira Kagimoto • Ryohei Chiba • Keita Tachibana	3:57
8.	"Distance"	Keita Tachibana	Keita Tachibana • JUNE	3:51
9.	"Get Down" (20XX version)	Keita Tachibana	Keita Tachibana • JUNE	3:09
10.	"DoU" (20XX version)	Keita Tachibana	Keita Tachibana • JUNE	3:27
Total length:				34:15

CD2: 20XX "The Best Instrumental"
No.	Title	Length
1.	"Forever Memories" (Instrumental)	5:01
2.	"Feel the Fate" (Instrumental)	4:45
3.	"Paradox" (Instrumental)	4:16
4.	"Try your emotion" (Instrumental)	4:10
5.	"Another Days" (Instrumental)	4:59
6.	"Because of you" (Instrumental)	3:23
7.	"New Paradise" (Instrumental)	5:11
8.	"Super Lover ~I need you tonight~" (Instrumental)	3:16
9.	"Love is message" (Instrumental)	4:58
10.	"Long Road" (Instrumental)	5:15
11.	"Pieces" (Instrumental)	5:40
12.	"Kireida" (キレイだ / It's Beautiful) (Instrumental)	3:27
13.	"Shiki" (四季 / Four Seasons) (Instrumental)	4:57
14.	"Yume no Basho e" (夢の場所へ / Place of Dream) (Instrumental)	4:19
15.	"Kawari Yuku Sora" (変わりゆく空 / Changing Sky) (Instrumental)	4:52
16.	"Izayoi no Tsuki" (十六夜の月 / 16th Moon) (Instrumental)	5:30
17.	"Yakusoku no Kakera" (約束のカケラ / Promise Piece) (Instrumental)	5:10
18.	"It's in the Stars" (Instrumental)	3:31
19.	"Trial" (Instrumental)	4:47
20.	"Boogie Woogie 66" (ブギウギ6) (Instrumental)	4:11
21.	"Hanamuke" (ハナムケ / Gift) (Instrumental)	3:40
22.	"Love is the Greatest Thing" (Instrumental)	3:36
23.	"Beautiful Life" (Instrumental)	3:41
24.	"Ameato" (アメあと / After Candy) (Instrumental)	4:34
25.	"Everyday" (Instrumental)	4:20
26.	"Can't Get Back" (Instrumental)	3:59
27.	"Rain is Fallin'" (Instrumental)	4:01
28.	"Hybrid Dream" (Instrumental)	4:10
29.	"New World" (Instrumental)	5:09
30.	"Truth ~Saigo no Shinjitsu~" (最後の真実 / The Final Truth) (Instrumental)	3:02
31.	"Addicted to Love" (Instrumental)	3:17
32.	"Be as One" (Instrumental)	4:27
33.	"Let's Get it On" (Instrumental)	5:14
34.	"You & I" (Instrumental)	3:36
35.	"Fly High" (Instrumental)	5:21
36.	"A Little Bit" (Instrumental)	3:59
37.	"Yume de Aerunoni ~Sometimes I Cry~" (夢で逢えるのに / I Can Meet You in My Dreams (Instrumental)	4:29
38.	"Fantasy" (Instrumental)	3:20
39.	"In Love with the Music" (Instrumental)	3:28
40.	"Boom Word Up" (Instrumental)	4:02
41.	"Backstage" (Instrumental)	3:10
42.	"We Don't Need to Talk Anymore" (Instrumental)	3:49
43.	"Time Has Gone" (Instrumental)	3:32
44.	"Dirty Talk" (Instrumental)	3:16
45.	"Get Down" (Instrumental)	3:08
46.	"DoU" (Instrumental)	3:26
47.	"Beautiful Now" (Instrumental)	3:22
Total length:		3:16:46

DVD
No.	Title	Director(s)	Length
1.	"Strip" (Music Video)	Hidenobu Tanabe	2:53
2.	"Document of 20XX "We are""		22:09
Total length:			25:02

== Charts ==
Oricon chart performance for 20XX "We Are"
Release	Chart	Peak position
November 24, 2021	Oricon Weekly Albums Chart	4

Chart performance for singles from 20XX "We Are"
Date	Title	Peak position
July 31, 2019	Get Down	16
January 22, 2020	DoU	25
