= Buddies (album) =

buddies

Remix album by Lead, w-inds, FLAME
- Released: March 18, 2003
- Recorded: 2002–2003
- Genres: House; hip hop; pop
- Length: 46:16
- Label: Pony Canyon

Lead, w-inds, FLAME chronology
buddies (2003)	Life On Da Beat (2003)

w-inds chronology
"The System of Alive" (2002)	"buddies " (2003)	"Prime of Life" (2003)

Buddies (stylized as buddies) is a remix album by the Japanese hip-hop groups Lead, w-inds and FLAME. The album featured several remixed songs by each group, including "Fly Away" by Lead, "What Can I Do?" by FLAME and "Forever Memories" by w-inds. By 2010, the album had sold over 47,810 units.

The album was released three months after w-inds.'s album The System of Alive, five months after FLAME's album Boys' Quest (stylized as BOYS' QUEST) and was the first album released by Lead, whereas the latter group had yet to release their first studio album Life On Da Beat (the album would be released the following month in April). buddies featured four songs by w-inds, three songs by FLAME and two songs by Lead, ending with a special mix by all three groups.

The album was only released as a standard CD. On the popular retail site HMV, the album obtained a five star ranking based on sixty-five reviews.

== Track listing ==
CD
No.	Title	Music	Original Artist	Length
1.	"New Paradise" (DJ TATSUTA CASSETTE VISION’s REMIX)	DJ TATSUTA	w-inds	4:54
2.	"What Can I Do?" (floatin’ reflex REMIX)	Hayabusa	FLAME	4:24
3.	"Paradox" (TinyVoice, Production REMIX)	Ryosuke Imai	w-inds	4:10
4.	"Fly Away" (AKIRA’S CONQUISTADOR REMIX)	AKIRA	Lead	4:42
5.	"Forever Memories" (Sweet Memories REMIX)	DJ CELORY	w-inds	4:50
6.	"Bye My Love" (TinyVoice, Production REMIX)	Ryosuke Imai	FLAME	4:02
7.	"show me the way" (TinyVoice, Production REMIX)	Ryosuke Imai	Lead	4:17
8.	"Another Days" (The Real Vibe Remix)	Shinchiro Murayama	w-inds	5:19
9.	"Mune no Kodou" (Liga Oriente Remix)	Kazunori Fujimoto	FLAME	4:30
10.	"buddies Mega Mix" (TinyVoice, Production REMIX)	Ryosuke Imai	w-inds • FLAME • Lead	5:08
Total length:				46:16
