= 2010 MTV World Stage VMAJ =

Annual Japanese music awards ceremony

- Date: May 29, 2010
- Location: Yoyogi National Gymnasium, Tokyo, Japan
- Hosted by: none
- Website: mtvjapan.com/mvaj

Television/radio coverage
- Network: MTV Japan

The MTV World Stage VMAJ 2010 were held on Saturday, May 29, at the Yoyogi National Gymnasium in Tokyo, Japan. The nominees were announced on March 31, 2010. Lady Gaga received five nominations while Jay-Z, Alicia Keys, The Black Eyed Peas, Namie Amuro, Miliyah Kato, and Juju all received three nominations each.

Exile set a new milestone at the event, becoming the first group to receive three awards for three consecutive years. This year, they won in the categories for Video of the Year, Album of the Year, and the Asia Icon Award.

== Awards ==
Winners are in bold text.

=== Video of the Year ===
Exile — "Futatsu no Kuchibiru"

- Namie Amuro — "Fast Car"
- Ayaka — "Minna Sora no Shita"
- Alicia Keys — "Doesn't Mean Anything"
- Lady Gaga — "Poker Face"

=== Album of the Year ===
Exile — Aisubeki Mirai e

- Namie Amuro — Past < Future
- The Black Eyed Peas — The E.N.D.
- Green Day — 21st Century Breakdown
- Superfly — Box Emotions

=== Best Male Video ===
Shota Shimizu — "Utsukushii Hibi yo"

- Jay'ed — "Everybody"
- Jay-Z featuring Alicia Keys — "Empire State of Mind"
- Kreva — "Shunkan speechless"
- Sean Paul — "So Fine"

=== Best Female Video ===
Namie Amuro — "Fast Car"

- Ayaka — "Minna Sora no Shita"
- Kaela Kimura — "Butterfly"
- Lady Gaga — "Poker Face"
- Rihanna — "Russian Roulette"

=== Best Group Video ===
Tohoshinki — "Share the World"

- Backstreet Boys — "Straight Through My Heart"
- The Black Eyed Peas — "I Gotta Feeling"
- Remioromen — "Kachōfūgetsu"
- Tokyo Incidents — "Nōdōteki Sanpunkan"

=== Best New Artist ===
Big Bang — "Gara Gara Go!"

- Mao Abe — "Itsu no Hi mo"
- Keri Hilson featuring Kanye West and Ne-Yo — "Knock You Down"
- Taylor Swift — "You Belong With Me"
- The Telephones — "Monkey Discooooooo"

=== Best Rock Video ===
Superfly — "Dancing on the Fire"

- 9mm Parabellum Bullet — "Inochi no Zenmai"
- Green Day — "Know Your Enemy"
- Muse — "Uprising"
- Radwimps — "Oshakanshama"

=== Best Pop Video ===
Big Bang — "Koe o Kikasete"

- Ikimono-gakari — "Yell"
- Kumi Koda — "Lick Me"
- Leona Lewis — "Happy"
- Pink — "Please Don't Leave Me"

=== Best R&B Video ===
Miliyah Kato — "Aitai"

- Chris Brown — "Crawl"
- Jasmine — "Sad to Say"
- Juju with Jay'ed — "Ashita ga Kuru Nara"
- Alicia Keys — "Doesn't Mean Anything"

=== Best Hip-Hop Video ===
Kreva — "Speechless"

- Eminem — "We Made You"
- Flo Rida featuring Kesha — "Right Round"
- Jay-Z featuring Alicia Keys — "Empire State of Mind"
- Rhymester — "Once Again"

=== Best Reggae Video ===
Han-Kun — "Keep it Blazing"

- Sean Kingston — "Fire Burning"
- Sean Paul — "So Fine"
- Pushim — "My Endless Love"
- Ryo the Skywalker — "Kokoni Aru Ima wo Tomoni Aruki Dasou"

=== Best Dance Video ===
Lady Gaga — "Poker Face"

- Cos/Mes — "Chaosexotica"
- David Guetta featuring Kelly Rowland — "When Love Takes Over"
- La Roux — "I'm Not Your Toy"
- Perfume — "One Room Disco"

=== Best Video from a Film ===
Juju with Jay'ed — "Ashita ga Kuru Nara" (from April Bride)

- Flumpool — "Dear Mr. & Ms. Picaresque" (from MW)
- Leona Lewis — "I See You" (from Avatar)
- Paramore — "Decode" (from Twilight)
- Shōnan no Kaze — "Tomo Yo" (from Drop)

=== Best Collaboration ===
W-inds featuring G-Dragon — "Rain Is Fallin'"

- Beyoncé featuring Lady Gaga — "Video Phone"
- Jay-Z featuring Alicia Keys — "Empire State of Mind"
- Juju with Jay'ed — "Ashita ga Kuru Nara"
- Miliyah Kato featuring Shota Shimizu — "Love Forever"

=== Best Karaokee! Song ===
Miliyah Kato featuring Shota Shimizu — "Love Forever"

- The Black Eyed Peas — "I Gotta Feeling"
- Kaela Kimura — "Butterfly"
- Lady Gaga — "Poker Face"
- Kana Nishino — "Motto..."

== Special awards ==
=== MTV Icon Award ===
Exile

=== Best Director ===
Kodama Hirokazu

== Live performances ==
- Big Bang — "Gara Gara Go!" / "Hands Up"
- 2NE1 — "Fire"
- Bradberry Orchestra — "Love Check"
- Exile — "24karats Stay Gold"
- Miliyah Kato — "Sayonara Baby" / "Bye Bye"
- Kesha — "Tik Tok" / "Your Love Is My Drug"
- K'naan with AI — "Wavin' Flag"
- Superfly — "Alright!!" / "Roll Over the Rainbow"
- Taio Cruz — "Break Your Heart"
- W-inds — "New World" / "Rain Is Fallin'"

== Guest celebrities ==
- Chemistry
- DJ Kaori
- Dream
- Miho Fukuhara
- Risa Hirako
- Iconiq
- Jay'ed
- Joy
- Juliet
- Tsuyoshi Kitazawa
- License
- Masato
- May J.
- Akina Minami
- Minmi
- Scandal
- Shōnan no Kaze
- Spontania
- Miho Tanaka
- Vanness Wu
- Chinatsu Wakatsuki
- Yu-A
