= Christmas Harmony: Vision Factory Presents =

Compilation album by Various artists
- Released: November 21, 2007
- Genres: Pop; J-Pop; Christmas
- Language: Japanese
- Label: Sonic Groove

Various artists chronology
Christmas Harmony: Vision Factory Presents (2007)	Spring Harmony: Vision Factory Presents (2008)

Christmas Harmony: Vision Factory Presents (stylized as CHRISTMAS HARMONY ～VISION FACTORY presents～) is a compilation album of composed of Christmas-themed songs by various Vision Factory artists. It was released shortly before the holiday season on November 21, 2007 as a 2-Disc bundle.

In December 2006, Vision Factory held a mobile contest titled "Christmas Songs You Choose", in which certain artists were chosen to take part in creating a Christmas album the following year.

The album charted at No. 89 on the Oricon Albums Chart.

== Track listing ==
CD1
No.	Title	Original Artist(s)	Length
1.	"Wishing on a groove"	Daichi Miura	3:49
2.	"Ding Dong"	Lead	3:33
3.	"No.1~Your Lady~"	MAX	3:34
4.	"Christmas Night" (English Version)	DA PUMP	4:17
5.	"Yukisora Letter" (雪空Letter / Snow Sky Letter)	Eriko Imai (elly)	5:37
6.	"Storytelling"	w-inds.	4:33
7.	"White Rose ~Koi no Toiki~" (恋の吐息 / Breath of Love)	Mio Tachibana	4:27
8.	"It's your time"	FLAME	4:02
9.	"SANTA CLAUS LIVES IN TOKYO"	Akina	4:29
10.	"My Darling Santa Claus"	Mio Tachibana	4:19

CD2
No.	Title	Original Artist(s)	Length
1.	"OkiDoki Christmas"	Lead
2.	"Moon Cry"	Toshihiko Nishimura
3.	"X'mas Melody"	Vanilla Mood
4.	"Shiroi Yuki" (白い雪 / White Snow)	Issa
5.	"Merry my love"	Maryjun Takahashi
6.	"True My Heart"	Nana Tanimura
7.	"Bokura no Hikari" (僕らの光 / Light of Ours)	Kentaro Akutsu
8.	"Ai no Kizuna" (愛のキズナ / Kizuna of Love)	TUFF PEAK BROS. from FLAME
9.	"Anata ga Soba ni" (あなたがそばに / By Your Side)	Mio Tachibana
10.	"FREEDOM SKY"	w-inds.

== Charts ==
Release	Chart	Peak position
November 21, 2007	Oricon Weekly Albums Chart	89
