= Spring Harmony: Vision Factory Presents =

Compilation album by Various Artists
- Released: February 13, 2008
- Genre: Pop; J-Pop
- Language: Japanese
- Label: Sonic Groove

Various Artists chronology
Christmas Harmony: Vision Factory Presents (2007)	Spring Harmony: Vision Factory Presents (2008)	Flower Festival: Vision Factory Presents (2008)

Spring Harmony: Vision Factory Presents (stylized as SPRING HARMONY ～VISION FACTORY presents～) is a compilation album composed of summer-themed songs by various Vision Factory artists. It was released at the beginning of Spring in Japan on February 13, 2008.

== Track listing ==
CD
No.	Title	Original Artist(s)	Length
1.	"Hajimari no Kisu" (始まりのキス / The First Kiss)	Eriko Imai (elly)	4:15
2.	"Sky"	Komorita Minoru	4:35
3.	"Risshun" (立春 / Beginning of Spring)	Toshihiko Nishimura	4:23
4.	"Get Your Dreams"	Eu Phoria	3:25
5.	"Sotsu Gyou Nante Shitaku ne!" (卒業なんてしたくねぇ！ / I Don't Want to Graduate!)	Ota Crew	3:47
6.	"Owaranai Epilogue" (終わらないエピローグ / Unfinished Epilogue)	Komorita Minoru	4:39
7.	"Forgive"	Toshihiko Nishimura	4:35
8.	"Thanks for..."	Lead	4:08
9.	"a special day"	MAX	4:45
10.	"Shall we dance?"	FLAME	4:00
