= B Howard =

American singer and songwriter

B. Howard
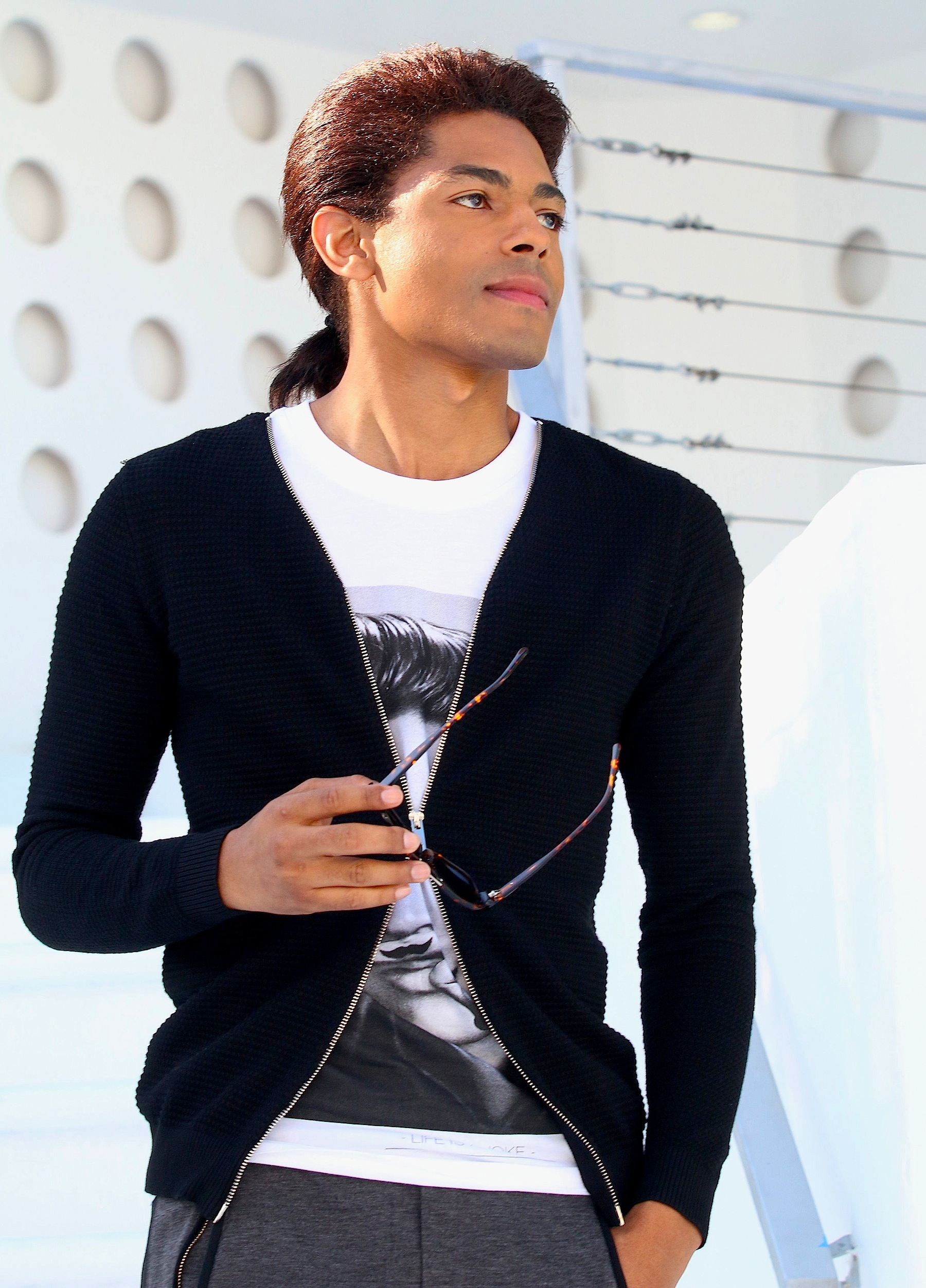
- Howard in 2014
- Born: Brandon Howard; Los Angeles, California, U.S.
- Other name: B. Howard
- Occupations: Singer-songwriter; dancer; record producer; actor; director
- Years active: July 17th 2009-present
- Musical career
- Genres: R&B; pop; hip-hop
- Instruments: Vocals; piano
- Years active: 2008–present
- Labels: Sony; Universal Music Japan; PPM Music
- Website: bhoward.com

Brandon Howard, known professionally as B Howard, is an American singer, songwriter, and record producer from Los Angeles, California.

He began his career as a producer and songwriter for other artists in 2003. He received his first formal credits doing so on Ne-Yo's album In My Own Words (2006)—which topped the Billboard 200—as well as Omarion and Bow Wow's collaborative album Face Off (2007)—which peaked at number 11 on the chart. His rose to fame in 2010 following the success of his single, Dancefloor. His Entertainment Company, 6 Point Entertainment, jointly released his first album, Genesis was released in 2010 with Universal Records Japan. His 2016 single, "Don't Say You Love Me" reached number 11 on the Dance/Electronic Songs chart. His 2017 single, "Necesito Tú Amor", was peaked number 3 on Billboard Top Latin Charts.

== Early life ==
B. Howard was born Brandon Howard in Los Angeles, California. He was raised between Los Angeles and Chicago. Howard's mother, Miki Howard, is also a successful singer-songwriter. Joe Jackson, the patriarch of the Jackson family, was Miki's manager in the '80s. His grandmother was Josephine Howard of The Caravans, the first group to have a gospel song played on secular radio and his grandfather was Clay Graham (1936–2018) of Pilgrim Jubilees. B. Howard said he first considered working in finance. He was inspired by MTV videos of A-ha and Tears for Fears, instead choosing a career in music. He adopted the artist name "Sonik" and first worked with Gerald Levert in Cleveland, Ohio.

== Music career ==
Howard has been working as a record producer since 2003.

His major placement on Ginuwine 2003 single "Love You More" which reached #23 on The Billboard Hot R&B/Hip-Hop Songs.

Throughout his career Howard has worked with Ne-Yo, Chris Brown, Missy Elliott, Ginuwine, Trey Songz, Dru Hill, Jay Sean, Marques Houston and Lupe Fiasco. As well as Vanessa Hudgens, W-inds, Koda Kumi, Risa Hirako, Jay Park, and 2face Idibia.

B. Howard started a featured artist with the single from 2008 and 2009.

B. Howard started a solo career in 2010 following the success of his first single, "Dancefloor" was released on July 20, 2010. In 2010, B Howard collaborated with Wyclef Jean, Jazmine Sullivan and J Pre to revamp the song "Ke Nako" as a homage to Nelson Mandela.

The first single from Genesis, "Super Model", was released via iTunes on February 8, 2011. The second single, "Dancefloor" made its US premiere on Wednesday, June 8 (2011) on iTunes and across all digital platforms. Howard performed in Japan to support this release. Howard is currently working on his upcoming American EP, Official. His single "I Do It" and released in 2013.

In 2014, B. Howard cover Zedd song "Clarity" was released with a single.

In 2015, B. Howard performed in Germany many songs.

Howard's single, "Don't Say You Love Me", hit number 11 on Billboard's Top Dance charts in January 2016.

Howard's single, "Necesito Tu Amor", was peaked number 3 on Billboard Top Latin Charts in 2017.

In 2018, B. Howard released the song "Nite and Day 3.0 (Girl You Gotta Know)", using samples of "Nite and Day". Howard joined China's virtual star festival in Beijing. Howard performed Poland with many songs.

In 2019, B. Howard performed in Port Grand, Karachi, Pakistan many songs (including Michael Jackson cover "You Are Not Alone" and "They Don't Care About Us"). B. Howard hops on board with clothing line Equality Wear and establishes with CEO and pro-athlete Chatilla van Grinsven a song for the brand's commercial and clothing line.

In 2020, B. Howard collaborated with Vanness Wu to release the song "We Are Champions" on his EPs, Loud. This song is about to be a champions.

In 2022, B. Howard covers Michael Jackson song "Thriller" (also known as B-Riller) was released with a music video. The song is about homage to the Biggest Selling Album of All Time.

In 2023, Howard performs songs for Tomorrow to honor Aaron Carter.

In 2024, B. Howard featured artist David May, cover Michael Jackson song "Liberian Girl" was released with a single.

He was set to represent United States in Intervision 2025 with the song "We Are Champions" under the real name, but on 17 September he himself announced that he would be unable to perform "due to unforeseen family circumstances".

== Michael Jackson comparisons ==
Howard's similarities to the late pop icon Michael Jackson have been a source of speculation, and in 2014 FilmOn.com claimed to have evidence that proved paternity. The tests were subsequently proven to be inconclusive.

In March 2014, singer Akon gave an interview with Larry King in which he, as a recording artist who has worked with both Howard and Jackson, claimed to believe Howard was Michael Jackson's son.

In an interview published in 2021, Aaron Carter also gave an interview with Vlad TV in which he states that B Howard is Michael Jackson's son.

== Discography ==
=== Production and songwriting ===
Song Title	Artist	Album	Release date	Credit
"Pass me by"	Dru Hill	Dru World Order	2002	Producer
"Good Luck"	Marques Houston	MH	2003	Songwriter
"Love You More"	Ginuwine	The Senior	2003	Songwriter
"Wide Open"	LSG	LSG2	2003	Producer
"Lesson Learned"	LSG	LSG2	2003	Producer
"Ya Kiss"	Kevin Lyttle	Kevin Lyttle	2004	Songwriter
"Taste of Dis"	Brooke Valentine	Chain Letter	2005	Writer and Arrangement
"Marriage"	Marques Houston	Naked	2005	Producer
"Covergirl"	Brooke Valentine	Chain Letter	2005	Producer
"Cheat"	Marques Houston	Naked	2005	Songwriter and producer
"What it Do"	Lupe Fiasco	Food & Liquor	2006	Songwriter and producer
Real Lyfe	"Say Boo"	Young Lyfe	2006	Songwriter and producer
"Kick Push II"	Lupe Fiasco	Food & Liquor	2006	Songwriter and producer
"I Ain't Gotta Tell Ya"	Ne-Yo	In My Own Words	2006	Songwriter and producer
"Enough"	Howard Hewett	If Only	2007	Composer
"Favorite Girl"	Marques Houston	Veteran	2007	Producer, Songwriter and Instruments
"You Should've Been Told Me"	Tichina Arnold	Soul Free	2007	Songwriter and Vocal Arranger
"Never Be Lonely"	Emily King	East Side Story	2007	Songwriter and Vocal Arranger
"Can't Get Tired of Me"	Bow Wow	Face Off	2007	Songwriter
"Gone With the Wind"	Vanessa Hudgens	Identified	2008	Songwriter
"Bedroom"	Donnie Klang	Just a Rolling Stone	2008	Writer
"Dr. Love"	Donnie Klang	Just a Rolling Stone	2008	Co-writer
"Portrait of Love"	Cheri Denis	In and Out of Love	2008	Songwriter
"Tonight"	Marques Houston	Mr. Houston	2009	Songwriter
"Now that I'm here"	Jackie Boys	Love and Beyond	2009	Songwriter and producer
"Truth"	W-inds	Another World	2009	Songwriter and producer
"Let it Go"	Double	Ballad Collection Mellow	2009	Songwriter
"Ke Nako"	Wyclef Jean feat. Jazmine Sullivan & J Pre	Listen Up! The Official 2010 Fifa World Cup Album	2010	Producer
"New Boyfriend"	Keke Palmer	Single	2011	Songwriter and producer
"Back to life"	Olivia Ong	Romance	2011	Co-Producer
"Eventually"	Double	Woman	2011	Producer
"Passing By"	Koda Kumi	Dejavu	2011	Songwriter, Producer & ft. Artist
"Demon"	Jay Park	Single	2011	Songwriter
"Fly"	2Face Idibia	The Unstoppable	2011	Songwriter and producer
"One Night"	Keita Tachibana	Side by Side	2013	Producer
"Searching"	Keita Tachibana	Side by Side	2013	Producer
"Necessito Tú Amor"	Legarda ft. B. Howard & BK Brasco	Single	2013	Songwriter & ft. Artist
"Addicted"	Melissa B.	Single	2013	Producer, Songwriter & ft. Artist
"What You Started"	Melissa B.	Single	2013	Producer, Songwriter & ft. Artist
"Pretty Girl"	Keita Tachibana	Side by Side	2013	Producer
"Mercy"	Corey Feldman	Angelic 2 the Core	2014	Songwriter & ft. Artist
"Feels Like Love"	La Toya Jackson	Single	2014	Producer
"Ain't Missing you"	Chief Keef ft. Jenn Em	Single	2015	Producer
"Champagne"	Charisse Mills ft. French Montana	Single	2015	Songwriter
"Blown Away"	Joe EL	Timeless	2015	Songwriter & ft. Artist
"Starlight"	Melissa B.	Starlight	2015	Producer, Songwriter & ft. Artist
"DSLYM (Don't Say You Love Me)"	B. Howard ft. BK Brasco	Nothing to Prove	2015	Songwriter & ft. Artist
"Physical"	Karma	Single	2016	Producer
"Necessito Tú Amor	Legarda ft. B. Howard	Single	2017	Songwriter & ft. Artist
"Necessito Tú Amor (Version Trap)	Legarda ft. B. Howard & Brasco	Single	2017	Songwriter & ft. Artist
"You and Me"	Alex To	Single	2017	Songwriter & Producer
"Crazy"	Bibi Zhou	Single	2017	Songwriter & ft. Artist
"Lose Control"	B. Howard ft. Siggy Dealz Jackson	Single	2019	Songwriter & ft. Artist
"Equality Wear"	B. Howard with Chatilla van Grinsven	Singles	2019	Songwriter, Producer & ft. Artist
"Christmas Time"	B. Howard	Single	2019	Producer & Songwriter
"We Are Champions	B. Howard ft. Vanness Wu	Loud	2020	Producer, Songwriter & ft. Artist
"Physical"	Melissa B.	Single	2022	Songwriter and producer
"Karma"	2BYG	Single	2025	Songwriter
"If It Ain't Love"	Ciera MacKenzie	Single	2025	Songwriter
"This Is How I Feel"	Jennifer Alexis	Single	2025	Producer
"Old School Love"	Cheyenne Womack	Single	2025	Producer & Songwriter

=== Artist ===
==== Genesis (released July 10, 2010) ====
- Dancefloor
- Super Model
- Addict
- Electric Lights (featuring Kamilah)
- Finally
- Once Again
- Take it Slow
- Flashback
- She's Got a Man
- Spend The Night
- Crush
- Ananda
- Killah
- Just Not Giving Up

==== Loud (released March 21, 2019) ====
- Mona Lisa
- One More Night
- Living Years
- DSYLM (Don't Say You Love Me) (featuring BK Brasco)
- Lose Control (featuring Siggy Dealz Jackson)
- Nite and Day 3.0 / Girl You Gotta Know
- Loud
- We Are Champions (featuring Van Ness Wu)
- Girlfriend

==== Loud (reissues November 18, 2022) ====
- Loud
- Nite and Day 3.0 (Girl You Gotta Know)
- Lose Control (featuring Siggy Dealz Jackson)
- We Are Champions (featuring Vanness Wu)
- Don't Be A Stranger

==== Guest vocalist ====
Song Title	Main Artist	Album	Release date
"The Finest"	Natz feat. Ya B & 2Face Idibia	Throwdown Vol. 1	2008
"Let it Go"	Double	Ballad Collection Mellow	2009
"LA to Vegas"	Jensen Kirk	Single	2009
"Let It Go"	Frankie Finch	Remixes	2009
"Ke Nako"	Wyclef Jean feat. Jazmine Sullivan & J Pre	Listen Up! The Official 2010 Fifa World Cup Album	2010
"Asian Girls"	Gepetto Jackson	Single	2010
"Demon"	Jay Park	Single	2011
"Passing By"	Koda Kumi	Dejavu	2011
"24 Hours"	Siggy "Dealz" Jackson	Single	2012
"Believe in Love"	The Rude Boys feat. Trick Daddy & Joe Little III	Single	2012
"Freedom"	Risa Hirako	Vegas	2012
"Fly"	2Face Idibia	The Unstoppable	2012
"Take Her Away"	Sixx John	Single	2013
"Beautiful"	BK Brasco ft. World	Single	2013
"Necesito Tú Amor"	Legarda ft. B. Howard & BK Brasco	Single	2013
"In Love"	Patrick Toussaint	Single	2014
"Yeah"	Patrick Toussaint	Truth	2014
"I'm Fly"	Stomy Bugsy	Single	2015
"Imagination (Use It)"	ENJ	Enjoy ENJ	2015
"United With Love"	Jan Fairchild & Friends	Single	2016
"Where U Been"	Vico	Single	2016
"Necesito Tú Amor"	Legarda	Single	2017
"Necesito Tú Amor (Version Trap)"	Legarda ft. B. Howard & Brasco	Single	2017
"You and Me"	Alex To	Single	2017
"6 Grapes"	Rockboy Bam	BAM Necesalary (By Any Means)	2018
"Take Your Ring Off"	Gepetto Jackson	Single	2019
"Let's Stay Together"	Miri Ben-Ari	Single	2020
"Coméntale"	Manny Rod	Single	2022
"Fatal Attraction"	Datboi H.O.P	20 / 20 Vision	2022
"Shake!"	King Myers	Single	2023
"Take Your Time"	Station Little	Single	2023
"Liberian Girl"	David May	Single	2024
"Gone"	Chill Spotlight	Chill Spotlight Vol.8	2024
"Right"	Billy Blue	The Life of Pedro	2025
"Touch Me"	Fiyah	Single	2025
"Beautiful Nightmares"	Chill's Spotlight	Chill's Spotlight, Vol.8	2025
"Habibi"	Dahov	Single	2025

=== Singles ===
Title	Release date	Album	Billboard rank
"Super Model"	2010	Genesis	–
"Dancefloor"	2011	Genesis	–
"Perfect Fit" feat. Taj Jackson, Taryll Jackson & Jason Edmonds	2012	Single	–
"Passing By (English Version)"	2012	Single	–
"Magic"	2013	Single	–
"Brain"	2013	Single	–
"I Do It"	2013	Official	–
"Clarity"	2014	Single	–
"Give It Up"	2015	Single	–
"DSYLM (Don't Say You Love Me)" feat. BK Brasco	2015	Nothing to Prove	No. 11
"Mona Lisa"	2016	Loud	–
"Necesito Tú Amor (Version Trap)" Legarda feat. B. Howard & BK Brasco	2017	Single	No. 3, Latin charts
"Fairytale"	2017	Single	–
"We Share Light" feat. Ashley Rose	2017	Single	–
"Nite and Day 3.0 (Girl You Gotta Know)"	2018	Loud	–
"Let Me Know (Dimelo)" feat. La Toya Jackson & Maffio	2018	Single	–
"Lose Control"	2019	Single	–
"Equality Wear" with Chatilla van Grinsven	2019	Single	–
"Christmas Time"	2019	Single	–
"We Are Champions" feat. Vanness Wu	2020	Loud	–
"Seatbelt"	2021	Single	–
"Don't Be A Stranger"	2021	Loud	–
"Thriller (B-Riller)"	2022	Single	–
"Loud"	2022	Loud	–
"Choosin' (All Eyes On Me)"	2024	Nostalgia	–
"Left Behind"	2024	Single	–
"Gone"	2024	Single	–
"We Are Champions (Intervision '25)" (credited as Brandon Howard)	2025	Single	–

=== Music videos ===
Year	Title
2009	"LA to Vegas" Jensen Kirk feat. B. Howard
2010	"Supermodel"
2011	"Passing By" Koda Kumi feat. B. Howard
2011	"Dancefloor"
2013	"Beautiful" BK Brasco feat. Wurld & B. Howard
2013	"Necesito Tú Amor" Legarda feat. B. Howard & BK Brasco
2013	"I Do It"
2013	"What Your Started" Melissa B. feat. B. Howard
2014	"Clarity"
2015	"Give It Up"
2015	"I'm Fly" Stomy Bugsy feat. B. Howard
2015	"DSYLM (Don't Say You Love Me)" feat. BK Brasco
2015	"Imagination (Use It)" ENJ feat. B. Howard
2016	"Mona Lisa"
2017	"Necesito Tú Amor" Legarda feat. B. Howard
2017	"Necesito Tú Amor (Version Trap)" Legarda feat. B. Howard & Brasco
2017	"You and Me" Alex To feat. B. Howard
2018	"Nite and Day 3.0 (Girl You Gotta Know)"
2019	"Lose Control" feat. Siggy Dealz Jackson
2019	"Equality Wear" with Chatilla van Grinsven
2019	"Christmas Time"
2020	"We Are Champions" feat. Vanness Wu
2021	"Seatbelt"
2021	"Don't Be A Stranger"
2022	"Thriller (B-Riller)"
2022	"Coméntale" Manny Rod feat. B. Howard
2022	"Loud"
2023	"Take Your Time" Station Little feat. B. Howard
2024	"Choosin' (All Eyes On Me)"
2024	"Liberian Girl" David May feat. B. Howard
2025	"Right" Billy Blue feat. B. Howard
2025	"Beautiful Nightmare" Chill's Spotlight feat. B. Howard

== Filmography ==
=== Film ===
Title	Year	Role	Notes
"A Tale Of Two Coreys"	2018	Michael Jackson	TV movie
"Lose Control" ft. Siggy Dealz Jackson	2019	Music Video	Director
"Christmas Time"	2019	Music Video	Short film
"We Are Champions" ft. Van Ness Wu	2020	Music Video	Director

=== Television ===
Title	Year	Role	Notes
Chelsea Lately	2014	Michael Jackson's Son (archive footage)	Episode: "#8.38"
Fashion News Live	2014-2015	Himself	3 episodes
Life with La Toya	2014	Himself	Episode: "How to Lose a Guy in One"
The Bobby Brown Story	2018	Michael Jackson (rumored)	Episode: "Part One"
Matty Ice Show	2020	Himself	Back 2 Back - B. Howard Joins the Show
We See You, We Stand with You	2020	Himself	TV Special
Songs for Tomorrow	2023	Himself	TV Special
Ironheart	2025	Writer	Episode: Will the Real Natalie Please Stand Up?
