= The Senior =

Studio album by Ginuwine
- Released: April 8, 2003
- Length: 72:09
- Label: Epic
- Producer: Casino Joe; Bryan Michael Cox; The Formula; R. Kelly; Clay Mack; Troy Oliver; Scott Storch; Big Tigger; Jerry "Juke" Vines

Ginuwine chronology
The Life (2001)	The Senior (2003)	Back II da Basics (2005)

Singles from The Senior
- 1. "Hell Yeah" Released: January 14, 2003; 2. "In Those Jeans" Released: May 2003; 3. "Love You More" Released: March 24, 2004

The Senior is the fourth studio album by American singer Ginuwine. It was released by Epic Records on April 8, 2003 in the United States. The singer reteamed with Troy Oliver to work on material for the album. He also consulted a number of new collaborators, including Scott Storch, Bryan-Michael Cox, R. Kelly, Brandon Howard and Joe Little III, the former of which – like Taylor – contributed three songs to the album. Ginuwine's 2002 single "Stingy" from the Barbershop soundtrack also appears on The Senior.

The album earned generally positive reviews from music, though some felt that it was inconsistent. The Senior debuted at number six on the US Billboard 200, with first-week sales of 122,000 copies, also becoming his first album to reach the top of the Top R&B/Hip-Hop Albums chart. It was eventually certified Gold by the Recording Industry Association of America (RIAA). The Senior was supported with the release of three singles, with all of them appearing on the Billboard Hot 100, including lead single "Hell Yeah" and follow-up "In Those Jeans," which peaked at number 17 and number eight, respectively.

== Background ==
Ginuwine described The Senior as "edgier." He further ealborated: "I wasn't trying to do what I did on my first or second album. As you grow, you learn and talk about different things. On every album you can see my growth." Schedulding conflicts prevented him from working with previous collaborator Timbaland. During an interview with 106 & Park, Ginuwine stated that Missy Elliott and Tweet were among the producers that worked on the album, however their contributions didn't make the final cut.

== Critical reception ==
Professional ratings
Aggregate scores
Source	Rating
Metacritic	60/100
Review scores
Source	Rating
AllMusic	3/5 stars
Blender	2/5 stars
Drowned in Sound	7/10
Entertainment Weekly	C
Robert Christgau	(choice cut)
Rolling Stone	3/5 stars
Vibe	3.5/5 stars

The Senior received generally favorable reviews from music critics, averaging a 60 out of a 100 among averaged reviews on Metacritic. AllMusic editor John Bush wrote the album "finds the R&B jack-of-all-trades attempting to get in on the game with tracks that mine urban lingo for potential hit combinations [...] As before, Ginuwine rises above most of his dozens of imitators in the contemporary R&B realm, with a set of productions that fit his voice perfectly and rate as slightly edgier than the norm." Entertainment Weekly's Craig Seymour found that "on the finest tracks of his fourth set, R&B balladeer Ginuwine delivers cliched slow jams with convincing emotion. But too much of the album skews toward the dance floor rather than the bedroom, with Ginuwine’s vocals lost in a routine groove. He calls this The Senior, but it’s sophomoric, at best." Vibe magazine remarked that "not much has changed for Ginuwine since his debut. He's still racing R. Kelly to see who can sing the ladies out of their panties first."

People editors Ralph Novak and Chuck Arnold found that "there are too many moments on Ginuwine's latest, The Senior, that are juvenile [...] Despite those missteps, the R&B; star still delivers some bright moments on this spotty disc [...] but in the end you're left wondering: Will the real Ginuwine please stand up?" Dan Leory, writing for Yahoo! LAUNCH, felt noted that The Senior "often sounds like he went straight to the graduation party instead. Finally over the grief of his parents' passing, which colored the mellow soul of 2001's The Life deep blue, Ginuwine is once again a randy R&B; stud, offering pony rides to all female comers. And even without Timbaland, who filled G's first two outings with some of his finest future funk, Ginuwine has a game plan as solid as his abs."

== Commercial performance ==
The Senior debuted and peaked at number six on the US Billboard 200, selling 122,000 copies in its first week, a little shy of the 152,000 copies Ginuwine's 2001 album The Life had debuted with. On Billboard's component charts, it became his first album to top the Top R&B/Hip-Hop Albums chart. The Senior was eventually certified gold by the Recording Industry Association of America (RIAA) for the shipment of over 500,000 copies in the United States. By November 2005, the album had sold over 863,000 units, according to Nielsen Soundscan.

== Track listing ==
The Senior track listing
No.	Title	Writer(s)	Producer(s)	Length
1.	"Mike Tyson" (Intro)			0:12
2.	"Get Ready" (featuring Snoop Dogg & The Rook)	Elgin Lumpkin; Troy Oliver; Calvin Broadus; Harvey "The Rook" Hester	Oliver	4:35
3.	"Chedda Brings" (featuring Jose Cenquentez)	Lumpkin; Oliver; Andre Deyo; Antonio McLendon; Joseph Harris Bennett II	Oliver	3:36
4.	"Hell Yeah" (featuring Baby) / "In Those Jeans (Interlude)"	R. Kelly; Bryan Williams	Kelly; Ginuwine^{[a]}	5:38
5.	"In Those Jeans"	Lumpkin; Hester	Jerry "Juke" Vines; Ginuwine^{[b]}; Hester^{[b]}	4:03
6.	"Stingy"	Bryan Michael Cox; Jason Perry; Johnta Austin	Cox; Perry^{[b]}	4:19
7.	"Love You More"	Lumpkin; James Smith; Brandon Howard; Casino Joe	Casino Joe; Smith^{[a]}; Howard^{[a]}	4:01
8.	"Bedda to Have Loved"	Lumpkin; Taylor; Darius Good; Luke Paterna	The Formula; Ginuwine; Taylor	11:31
9.	"Locked Down"	Lumpkin; Scott Storch	Storch	5:03
10.	"On My Way"/"Sex" (Interlude)	Lumpkin; Taylor	Taylor; Ginuwine^{[a]}	4:56
11.	"Sex" (featuring Solé)	Lumpkin; Tonya Johnston; Storch	Storch	3:50
12.	"Bedda Man"	Lumpkin; Storch	Storch	3:45
13.	"Our First Born"	Lumpkin; Taylor	Taylor	4:15
14.	"Big Plans" (featuring Method Man)	Lumpkin; Taylor; Deyo; Clifford Smith	Oliver	3:27
15.	"Hell Yeah (Remix)" (featuring R. Kelly, Baby & Clipse)	Kelly; Williams	Kelly	4:28
16.	"Tigger & the Gizzle"	Lumpkin; Mack; Darian Morgan	Clay Mack; Big Tigger	4:28
Total length:				72:09

Notes

- ^{^[a]} denotes additional producer
- ^{^[b]} denotes co-producer

== Charts ==
=== Weekly charts ===
Weekly chart performance for The Senior
Chart (2003)	Peak position
Canadian Albums (Nielsen SoundScan)	67
Canadian R&B Albums (Nielsen SoundScan)	22
French Albums (SNEP)	138
Dutch Albums (Album Top 100)	99
US Billboard 200	6
US Top R&B/Hip-Hop Albums (Billboard)	1

=== Year-end charts ===
Year-end chart performance for The Senior
Chart (2003)	Position
US Billboard 200	87
US Top R&B/Hip-Hop Albums (Billboard)	37

== Certifications ==
Certifications and sales for The Senior
Region	Certification	Certified units/sales
United States (RIAA)	Gold	863,000
