= Legarda (singer) =

Colombian singer (1989–2019)

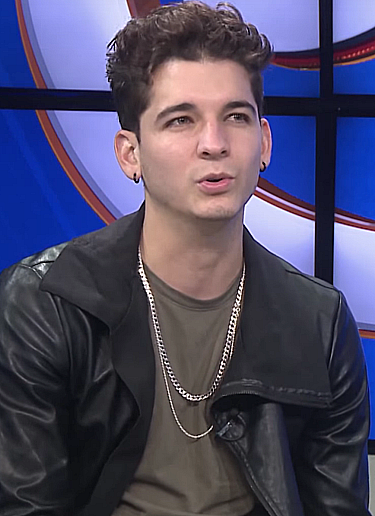
- Legarda in 2017

Background information
- Born: Fabio Andrés Legarda Lizcano; 18 November 1989; Popayán, Cauca, Colombia
- Died: 7 February 2019 (aged 29) Medellín, Antioquia, Colombia
- Genre: Urban
- Occupations: Singer-songwriter, YouTuber
- Years active: 2016–2019
- Label: Sony Music

Fabio Andrés Legarda Lizcano (Popayán, Cauca, 18 November 1989—Medellín, Antioquia, 7 February 2019) artistically known as Legarda, was a Colombian singer and internet personality. He made himself known in 2016 through his single "La Verdad", and later by singles as "Ya Estoy Mejor", which he made a remix with singer Andy Rivera. He also collaborated with singer Leslie Shaw in 2017.

Hours after his death, the music video for the song "Nutella" was released on YouTube, where he collaborated with Dejota and Ryan Roy.

== Biography ==
=== Beginnings and career ===
Legarda was born on 18 November 1989 in Popayán, Cauca, Colombia, but from an early age he moved to Atlanta, United States. At age 11 he began to devote himself to musical composition. Legarda's interest in music began at an early age, and he was exposed to a variety of genres including salsa, merengue, reggaeton, hip hop, pop, and R&B. After moving to the United States, Legarda felt inspired by the huge influence music had on people, which helped him to develop his love for the art form as he watched more performances. Working with multi Platinum selling, Grammy Award Winning Record producer/writer Arnold Hennings combined the RnB and Colombian heritage to create Fabio's iconic innovative style and flow.

A year later, Legarda decided to work on his music, and the concept of Fabio was born. Being able to fluently speak English and Spanish helped him communicate and work with various producers, artists, and dancers to create a unique sound. In the studio, Legarda was known for his productivity, constantly making records.

Legarda began his musical training by taking vocal lessons at Jan Smith Studios and Peggy Still School of Music in Atlanta, Georgia. He also worked on his stage presence by taking classes with O So Krispie, winner of the UPN reality show "R U The Girl", and attending the Dance 411 academy.

In 2006, Legarda met Latin Grammy Award Nominee and multi-platinum producer Gustavo Arenas, who mentored him throughout his career in the music industry. Legarda was signed with Queen Latifah's management team, Flavor Unit. His musical style was mostly urban.

Legarda also opened up performances for nationwide and worldwide artists such as Nina Sky, Shawty Lo, R.K.M. & Ken-Y, The Shop Boyz, and others. Legarda's shows included a DJ, two dancers, and a live performance by himself. He was well-liked among fellow musicians, and his fan base grew rapidly over time.

Legarda, who earned a business degree from Georgia State University, began expanding his artistic repertoire in 2012 by acting in his first stage production of RUN directed by Tabiyus at the Rialto Center for the Arts and later created his first short film for his single "Soy Campeon" in 2014.

=== 2016 - 2019: Sony Music and International Breakthrough ===
Legarda signed a recording deal with Sony in 2016. With the support of Sony Music, Legarda released his first single, "La Verdad", a song he co-wrote with Mr. Jukeboxx and Dejota 2021, with the arrangements of Bryan Anzel and the musical production of Dejota 2021. The mix was done by the multi-platinum Tito Earcandy, who has worked with artists such as Beyoncé, Jason Derulo, and Janet Jackson, among others. "La Verdad" along with other songs like "My Love", "You Don't Have a Boyfriend", "I Need Your Love", "Party All Night", "I Hate Love", and "Soy Campeón" were successful on the Latin American urban music scene.

In 2016, Legarda released four more singles, including "I'm Better Now", "Hypnotized", "Mala Es", and "Clavos". The following year, he released three new songs: "I Need Your Love", "I Will Find You", and "Libre".

In 2018, Legarda released three more singles: "Uber Sex", "Modo Avión", and "Otra Vez". "Otra Vez" featured Legarda's signature reggaeton sound and was a collaboration with Luisa Fernanda W, Itzza Primera, Dejota 2021, and Ryan Roy. It was released on October 18, 2018, and has since garnered over 75 million views on YouTube. The single has become a popular hit in Colombia and around the world and remains one of his most successful releases.

Legarda shared the stage with a number of international artists, including Pitbull and Don Omar.

He reached greater popularity for his participation in the competition program of RCN Televisión MasterChef Celebrity. Following his participation in the program, he began a relationship with YouTuber and singer Luisa Fernanda W, with whom he worked to compose singles.

== Death ==
Legarda died on 7 February 2019, after being injured by a stray bullet fired during an attempted, unrelated car theft (and which happened to hit the Uber car he was riding at the time, near the location of the theft) in Medellín, Antioquia, Colombia. The singer entered the hospital with a diagnosis of "very severe brain damage". At 4:50 p.m. He went into cardiorespiratory arrest, and after several attempts at resuscitation, died at 5:15 p.m. of that same day.

On 10 February 2019, a tribute to the singer was made at the La Macarena Show Center in Medellín which was presented by YouTuber Luisa Fernanda W and members of the singer's family. The event was attended by several renowned YouTubers and singers such as Andy Rivera, Pasabordo and Pipe Bueno among others, which offered a live concert in homage to Legarda. Several emotional messages from singers such as Carlos Vives, Maluma, Sebastián Yatra and Karol G were also screened live. Maluma posted a photo of the late singer and discussed the wider impact of Legarda's death. "It's incredible that these things keep happening in my country," he said, referring to the country's rampant crime and violence. "We have to open our eyes, Colombia, this needs to stop." Finally, the prosecution authorized the singer's parents to cremate the body to later be taken to Atlanta.

=== Aftermath ===
After recently promoting his new single "Nutella", which was set to premiere on Thursday, the video was released on YouTube only hours after his death. The phrase "He who leaves doesn't die, only he who's forgotten dies" was also attributed to Legarda. The video has over 31 million views to date on YouTube.

On February 10, 2019, a memorial service for Legarda was held at the Movistar Arena in Bogotá, Colombia, which drew approximately 15,000 people.

== Legacy ==
=== Artistry ===
Fabio Legarda combined hip hop, pop, and Latin rhythms, and music critics commended his energetic performances and charismatic personality on stage. He performed at over 300 venues around the southeastern region of the United States, including The Latin Festival of Atlanta, where he was a headliner and presented his music in front of over 5,000 people. Legarda was a rising star in the music industry and had a growing fan base both in Colombia and internationally.

In addition to his music, Legarda was also known for his philanthropic work. He was a vocal advocate for mental health awareness and suicide prevention, and his foundation, the Legarda Foundation, continues to work towards these causes in his memory. Legarda's lasting legacy is a testament to his talent, kindness, and passion for making a positive impact on the world.

=== Posthumous ===
Dejota, a musician, has released a new music video titled "Anoche Llamé", which features the vocals of the late Colombian artist Legarda. The music video is a tribute to Legarda, who died four years ago and played a significant role in Dejota's rise to success in the music industry.

The song has a reggaeton beat and tells the story of a lover who is sending mixed signals. Legarda's vocals were incorporated into the song using digital technology, making this one of his first major releases since his passing. The music video's release coincides with the anniversary of Legarda's death, making it a poignant tribute to his legacy.

== Discography ==
=== Singles ===
Musical videos

- "Anoche Llame" (2023; Dejota)
- "Nutella" (2019; Ryan Roy & Dejota)
- "Chevereando" (2019; Daniela Darcourt)
- "11:11" (2018)
- "Otra vez" (2018; Itzza Primera, Luisa Fernanda W, Dejota 2021, Ryan Roy)
- "Modo avión" (2018)
- "Roma" (2018; Itzza Primera)
- "Uber Sex" (2018; Dylan Fuentes)
- "Necesito tu amor" (2017; B. Howard, Brasco)
- "Volverte a ver" (2017; Leslie Shaw)
- "Ya estoy mejor" (Remix) (2016; Andy Rivera)
- "La Verdad" (2016)
- "Soy Campeón" (2014)

Songs

- "Te encontraré" (2017)
- "Libre" (2017; Mr. Jukeboxx)
- "Hipnotizado" (2016; Mr. Jukeboxx)
- "Mala es" (2016)
- "Clavos" (2016)
- "Carolina" (2014)
