= In Those Jeans =

Single by Ginuwine

from the album The Senior
- Released: May 2003
- Genre: R&B
- Length: 4:03
- Label: Epic
- Songwriters: Elgin Lumpkin; Harvey Hester
- Producers: Jerry "Juke" Vines; Harvey "The Rook" Hester (co.); Ginuwine (co.)

Ginuwine singles chronology
"Hell Yeah" (2003)	"In Those Jeans" (2003)	"Love You More" (2004)

"In Those Jeans" is a song by American singer Ginuwine. It was written by Harvey "The Rook" Hester along with the singer for his fourth studio album The Senior (2003), while production was helmed by Jerry "Juke" Vines, featuring co-production from Hester and Ginuwine. Released as the album's second single, it became his third and final top 10 single on the US Billboard Hot 100 to date, peaking at number eight. The official remix of "In Those Jeans" features rapper Grafh.

== Track listing ==
CD single
No.	Title	Length
1.	"In Those Jeans" (Album Version)	4:27
2.	"In Those Jeans" (Radio Edit)	3:52
3.	"In Those Jeans" (Instrumental)	4:26
4.	"In Those Jeans" (A Capella)	4:26
5.	"In Those Jeans" (Callout Hook)	0:15

== Credits and personnel ==
Credits lifted from the liner notes of The Senior.

- Ginuwine – co-producer, vocals, writer
- Harvey "The Rook" Hester – co-producer, writer
- Jean-Marie Horvat – mixer
- Scott Kieklak – recording engineer
- Scott Storch – drum programming
- Javier Valverde – recording assistant
- Jerry "Juke" Vines – producer

== Charts ==
=== Weekly charts ===
Chart (2003)	Peak position
US Billboard Hot 100	8
US Hot R&B/Hip-Hop Songs (Billboard)	3
US Rhythmic Airplay (Billboard)	5

=== Year-end charts ===
Chart (2003)	Position
US Billboard Hot 100	50
US Hot R&B/Hip-Hop Songs (Billboard)	21

== Certifications ==
Region	Certification	Certified units/sales
New Zealand (RMNZ)	Platinum	30,000^{‡}
United States (RIAA)	Gold	500,000^{^}
^{^} Shipments figures based on certification alone.^{‡} Sales+streaming figures based on certification alone.

== Music video ==
The music video for "In Those Jeans" was directed by Chris Robinson and released in July 2003. The video featured as video models: Kimora Lee Simmons, Natashia Williams, LaNisha Cole, Talani Rabb, La’Shontae Heckard, and Tyeshia Robinson.
