= Shinobu Otowa =

Japanese enka singer (born 1977)

- Also known as: Shinobu Otowa
- Born: Chieko Yoshimura; March 16, 1977 (age 49); Shimonoseki, Yamaguchi, Japan
- Origin: Tokyo, Japan
- Genres: Enka
- Occupation: Singer
- Years active: 2001–2012
- Label: King Records
- Website: goldenmusic.co.jp/shinobu.htm

Shinobu Otowa (音羽しのぶ, Otowa Shinobu; born March 16, 1977) is a Japanese enka singer.

She was born as Chieko Yoshimura (吉村智恵子 Yoshimura Chieko) in Shimonoseki, Yamaguchi.

== Career ==
Born in Hikoshima, Shimonoseki, and raised in Sanyo-cho, Asa-gun (now Sanyo-Onoda). She graduated from Asa Elementary School and Asa Junior High School. In 1991, she won the Grand Prix at the 15th Nagasaki Song Festival.

On November 21, 1992, while attending Horikoshi High School, she debuted as a high school student enka singer under the stage name "Tsukasa Chieko" with the song "Namida to Iu Na no Minatomachi" (A Port Town Called Tears) from Sony Records. On June 1, 1994, she released "Yuki Misaki" (Snow Cape), but it was not a hit. She later studied under composer Mizumori Hideo, and on November 20, 1999, changed her name to "Morikawa Misato" and re-debuted with "Shiawase Hagure" (Stray Happiness). Sony launched the first official website for an enka singer, but it was also unsuccessful.

After further training under Mizumori, she re-debuted on September 5, 2001, under the stage name "Otowa Shinobu" as an artist commemorating King Records' 70th anniversary. Mizumori chose the stage name from "Otowa, Bunkyo-ku, Tokyo", where King Records' headquarters are located. She also enlisted fashion producer Uno Kanda, and actively appeared on talk shows and other media wearing Kanda's eccentric costumes. Her debut song, "Shinobu no Wataridori", became a hit, and she won the New Artist Award at the 43rd Japan Record Awards that same year.

In 2002, she received the Cable Music Award at the 35th Japan Cable Awards. In 2004, she was appointed as a Yamaguchi Prefecture Local Sake Ambassador, in connection with her single "Nakizake" (Crying Sake). In 2005, she received the Cable Music Award at the 38th Japan Cable Awards.

She had been on hiatus since December 2012, but restarted her career in 2018 as Chieko Yoshimura, engaging in musical activities that are not bound by genre.

== Discography ==
=== Singles ===
- しのぶの渡り鳥 (Shinobu no Wataridori) May 9, 2001
- しのぶの一番纏 (Shinobu no Ichibanmatoi) May 21, 2002
- 昔の彼に逢うのなら (Mukashi no Kare ni Au no nara) October 22, 2002
- 最終霧笛 (Saishū Muteki) February 25, 2003
- 泣き酒 (Nakizake) January 1, 2004
- 明日川 (Ashitagawa) July 7, 2004
- 佐渡なさけ (Sadonasake) February 23, 2005
- 二年酒 (Ninenzake) August 24, 2005
- 風の吹きよで (Kaze no Fukiyode) January 2, 2006
- 花燃え (Hanamoe) July 26, 2006

=== Albums ===
- 昭和の流行歌 (Shōwa no Ryūkōka) March 27, 2002
- 最終霧笛～しのぶの渡り鳥ベスト13 (Saishū Muteki ~ Shinobu no Wataridori Best 13) August 27, 2003
