= Love You More (Ginuwine song) =

2004 single by Ginuwine

Single by Ginuwine

from the album The Senior
- Released: March 24, 2004
- Length: 4:03
- Label: Epic
- Songwriters: Casino Joe; Thomas Evans; Brandon Howard; Elgin Lumpkin; James Smith
- Producer: Brandon Howard + Casino Joe

Ginuwine singles chronology
"In Those Jeans" (2003)	"Love You More" (2004)	"When We Make Love" (2005)

"Love You More" is a song by American singer Ginuwine. It was co-written by Casino Joe, Brandon Howard, and James Smith for his fourth studio album The Senior (2003), while production on the track overseen by the former. Released by Epic Records as the album's fourth and final single in March 2004, it peaked at number 28 on the US Hot R&B/Hip-Hop Songs chart.

== Track listing ==
CD single
No.	Title	Length
1.	"Love You More" (Single Version)	4:01
2.	"Love You More" (Instrumental)	4:01
3.	"Love You More" (A Cappella)	4:01
4.	"Love You More" (Callout Hook)	0:20

== Charts ==
Chart (2004)	Peak position
US Billboard Hot 100	78
US Hot R&B/Hip-Hop Songs (Billboard)	28
