= Eu Phoria =

Japanese all-female rock/pop band from 2002 to 2009

- Origin: Japan
- Genres: Rock; pop
- Years active: 2002–2009
- Label: avex trax
- Website: Official Site

Eu Phoria (ユーフォーリア, Yūfōria) was a Japanese all-female band, formed in 2002. They made their major debut in 2007 on Avex's label Sonic Groove. Their songs were used as the theme songs of various Japanese television dramas and variety shows such as Tokumei Kakarichō Tadano Hitoshi, Itadakimuscle, Junk Sports, and DOWN TOWN DX. The band's final performance was on October 31, 2009. Both Tomoko and Reona went on to join Gacharic Spin and Doll$Boxx.

== Members ==
- Shoco - Real name: Shōko Suzuki (鈴木翔子) - Vocal
- Tomo^{2} - Real name: Tomoko Midorikawa (翠川智子) - Guitar
- Ayaka - Real name: Ayaka Haraguchi (原口彩香) - Bass
- Reona - Real name: Reona Suzuki (鈴木玲緒奈) - Keyboard (Leader)
- Sawa^{2} - Real name: Sawako Suzuki (鈴木佐和子) - Drums

Reona and Ayaka founded the band with two other original members, who later quit. Shoco and Tomo² joined in 2005, and Sawa² joined a year later.

== Discography ==
=== Singles ===
- Single Bed/Hey! (シングルベッド／Hey!) (released on February 14, 2007)
1. Single Bed
2. Hey!
3. Valentine Jealousy
- Yakusoku (約束) (released on August 1, 2007)
1. Yakusoku
2. Struggle
3. Cheeky girl
- Proud (released on March 12, 2008)
1. Proud
2. Ride On
3. With Bright Eyes

=== Other songs ===
Found on the compilation album Spring Harmony: Vision Factory Presents (February 13, 2008):

- Get Your Dreams

Can be bought on Vision Factory's web site for mobile phones:

- Smile New Year

Covers of the following songs are only played at live shows:

- Candy Kiss
- Show Me
- Truth
- Little Wing
- Memories
- My Boy
- STARS~Hoshitachi no Uta~ (STARS～星たちのうた～) (STARS~Song of the Stars~)

These cover songs have been played at live concerts:

- Living Loving Maid (Led Zeppelin)
- My Happy Ending (Avril Lavigne)
- Highway Star (Deep Purple)
- You Keep Me Hangin' On (The Supremes)
- Satisfaction (The Rolling Stones)
