= Hell Yeah (Ginuwine song) =

2003 single by Ginuwine

Single by Ginuwine featuring Baby

from the album The Senior
- Released: January 14, 2003
- Length: 3:40
- Label: Epic
- Songwriters: R. Kelly; Bryan Williams
- Producer: R. Kelly

Ginuwine singles chronology
| "Crush Tonight" (2002) | "Hell Yeah" (2003) | "In Those Jeans" (2003) |

"Hell Yeah" is a song by American R&B singer Ginuwine featuring rapper Baby. It was written, produced, and arranged by R. Kelly for his album Chocolate Factory, however in the wake of his sexual misconduct allegations, it ended up being sold to Ginuwine for his fourth studio album The Senior (2003) because of its hedonistic lyrical content. Released as the album's lead single, the song became a top 20 hit in the United States, peaking at number seventeen on the US Billboard Hot 100, and reached the top thirty in the United Kingdom. The official remix features Baby and Clipse along with Kelly. A music video for "Hell Yeah" was shot in Las Vegas and includes a cameo by rapper Snoop Dogg and comedian DeRay Davis.

== Track listing ==
CD single
| No. | Title | Writer(s) | Producer(s) | Length |
|---|---|---|---|---|
| 1. | "Hell Yeah" (Radio Edit featuring Baby) | R. Kelly; Bryan Christopher Williams | Kelly | 3:38 |
| 2. | "Hell Yeah" (Remix featuring Baby, R. Kelly and Clipse) | Kelly; Williams; Gene Thornton; Terrence Thornton | Kelly | 4:28 |

Enhanced maxi-single
| No. | Title | Writer(s) | Producer(s) | Length |
|---|---|---|---|---|
| 1. | "Hell Yeah" (Radio Edit featuring Baby) | Kelly; Williams | Kelly | 3:38 |
| 2. | "Hell Yeah" (Remix featuring Baby, R. Kelly and Clipse) | Kelly; Williams; Thornton; Thornton | Kelly | 4:28 |
| 3. | "Pony" (Ride It Mix) | Elgin Lumpkin; Tim Mosley; Stephen Garrett | Timbaland | 5:05 |
| 4. | "Hell Yeah" (Video Version featuring Baby) | | | 4:23 |

== Credits and personnel ==
Credits lifted from the liner notes of The Senior.

- Baby – vocals, writer
- Ginuwine – executive producer, vocals
- David McPherson – co-executive producer
- R. Kelly – arranger, producer, writer
- Jerry Vines – co-executive producer

== Charts ==
=== Weekly charts ===
Weekly chart performance for "Hell Yeah"
| Chart (2003) | Peak position |
|---|---|
| Belgium (Ultratip Bubbling Under Flanders) | 11 |
| Netherlands (Dutch Top 40) | 27 |
| Netherlands (Single Top 100) | 38 |
| Scotland Singles (OCC) | 52 |
| UK Singles (OCC) | 27 |
| UK Hip Hop/R&B (OCC) | 7 |
| US Billboard Hot 100 | 17 |
| US Hot R&B/Hip-Hop Songs (Billboard) | 16 |
| US Pop Airplay (Billboard) | 12 |
| US Rhythmic Airplay (Billboard) | 5 |

=== Year-end charts ===
Year-end chart performance for "Hell Yeah"
| Chart (2003) | Position |
|---|---|
| US Billboard Hot 100 | 74 |
| US Hot R&B/Hip-Hop Songs (Billboard) | 78 |

== Release history ==
List of releases of "Hell Yeah"
| Region | Date | Format(s) | Label(s) | Ref. |
|---|---|---|---|---|
| United States | January 27, 2003 | Rhythmic contemporary · urban contemporary radio | Epic | |
