= Journey (W-inds album) =

Studio album by w-inds.
- Released: March 7, 2007
- Recorded: Late 2006 - 2007
- Genre: J-Pop
- Length: 1:00:26
- Label: Pony Canyon

W-inds. chronology
| Thanks (2006) | Journey (2007) | w-inds. Mega Mix (2007) |

Journey is the seventh studio album of J-Pop band w-inds. It was released on March 7, 2007. It reached 8th place on the Oricon Weekly Albums Chart.

== Track listing ==
1. "This Is Our Show"
2. "Top Secret"
3. "Is That You"
4. "Crazy for You"
5. "Devil"
6. "Trial"
7. "Toui Kioku" (遠い記憶 / Distant Memory)
8. "Milky Way"
9. "Journey"
10. "Message" (メッセージ)
11. "Chizu Naki Tabiji" (地図なき旅路 / Journey Without a Map)
12. "Celebration"
13. "Boogie Woogie 66" (ブギウギ)
14. "Triangle"
15. "Hanamuke" (ハナムケ / Gift)

== Charts and sales ==
=== Oricon sales charts (Japan) ===
| Release | Chart | Peak position | Sales total | Chart run |
|---|---|---|---|---|
| March 7, 2007 | Oricon Daily Albums Chart | | | |
| March 7, 2007 | Oricon Weekly Albums Chart | 8 | 33,420 | 1 week |
| March 7, 2007 | Oricon Monthly Albums Chart | 27 | | |
| March 7, 2007 | Oricon Yearly Albums Chart | | | |
