= All City Steppers =

Japanese rock band consisting of Leo Imamura and Ryuki Maeda

All City Steppers オールシティステッパーズ
- Origin: Japan
- Genres: Rock
- Years active: 2013-present
- Labels: Flight Master
- Members: Ryuichi; Leo; Ryuki
- Website: www.allcitysteppers.com

All City Steppers (オールシティステッパーズ, Ōru Shiti Suteppāzu; stylized as ALL CITY STEPPERS) is a Japanese rock band signed under Flight Master. The band's members consist of Ryuichi (guitar and backing vocals), Leo (guitar and vocals), and Ryuki (bass).

== History ==
=== 2013-present: "Precious Girl" and Sexy Virgin Riot ===
Ryuichi Ogata and Ryuki Maeda from the band Terror Familia were childhood friends. While Ryuichi was performing with the band Radio Foundation, they became acquainted with Leo Imamura from the band The John's Guerilla in 2008. On July 12, 2009, Kenma Miyaoku, the frontman for Radio Foundation, died from a heart attack, prior to recording their debut album. The three became reacquainted with each other at Miyaoku's funeral.

In 2013, they formed the rock band All City Steppers as a side project, with Ryuichi on guitar and backing vocals, Leo on guitar and lead vocals, and Ryuki on bass. Their debut single, "Precious Girl", was released on August 21, 2013, and peaked at #31 on the Oricon Weekly Singles Chart. They made their first television appearance on August 27, 2013 on TBS's Live B, and embarked on their first nationwide tour, We Are All City Steppers, later that year.

All City Steppers' first album, Sexy Virgin Riot, was released on March 5, 2014, and peaked at #36 on the Oricon Weekly Albums Chart. A music video for the album's leading track, "Witch", was released to promote the album. They will be releasing their second album, Partyage, on October 3, 2018. The title track, "Little World", was released on September 5, 2018 as a digital single to promote the album.

On June 1, 2020, Ogata announced that he was retiring from entertainment due to being diagnosed with psychosomatic disorder, leaving him prone to experiencing stress and anxiety. He later returned in 2021.

== Members ==
=== Current ===
- Ryuichi - guitar, backing vocals
- Leo - guitar, lead vocals
- Ryuki - bass guitar

== Discography ==
=== Albums ===
Title	Details	Peak chart positions	Sales
Title	Details	JPN	Sales
Sexy Virgin Riot	Released: March 5, 2014; Label: Flight Master; Formats: CD	36	
Partyage	Released: October 3, 2018; Label: Flight Master; Formats: CD	61	

=== Singles ===
Title	Year	Peak chart positions	Sales	Album
Title	Year	JPN	Sales	Album
"Precious Girl"	2013	31		Sexy Virgin Riot

=== Promotional singles ===
Title	Year	Peak chart positions	Sales	Album
Title	Year	JPN	Sales	Album
"Little World"	2018			Partyage

== Tours ==
- We Are All City Steppers (2013)
