= Forever Memories =

2001 single by w-inds

Single by w-inds.

from the album 1st Message
- B-side: Moon Clock; Forever Memories (Za Downtown Street Remix)
- Released: March 14, 2001
- Recorded: 2001
- Genre: J-Pop, hip hop
- Label: Flight Master; CD (PCCA-01516)
- Songwriter: Hiroaki Hayama
- Producer: Hiroaki Hayama

W-inds. singles chronology
| "Forever Memories" (2001) | "Feel the Fate" (2001) |

"Forever Memories" is the debut single by Japanese hip-hop group W-inds (stylized as w-inds.) released on March 14, 2001. The single debuted on Oricon at No. 12 and remained on the charts for 23 weeks. The success of the single and their following single, "Feel the Fate", helped them win the Best Newcomer Award during the 43rd Japan Record Awards.

== Information ==
"Forever Memories" is the debut single by Japanese hip-hop group W-inds under the Pony Canyon sub-label Flight Master. The single debuted in the top twenty of the Oricon Singles Charts, coming in at No. 12 and remaining on the charts for 23 consecutive weeks. The success of the single, along with their following single, "Feel the Fate", helped w-inds secure the Best Newcomer Award during the 43rd Japan Record Awards.

The single was only released as a standard CD, which contained the title track, the coupling track "Moon Clock" and a remix and instrumental for "Forever Memories". While the music video was released for syndication to the public upon the single's release, it was not available for the public to purchase until their DVD/VHS release Works vol.1 in March 2002.

"Forever Memories" was written and composed by musical composer Hiroaki Hayama, who also composed the coupling track "Moon Clock."

== Track listing ==
CD
| No. | Title | Lyrics | Music | Length |
|---|---|---|---|---|
| 1. | "Forever Memories" | Hiroaki Hayama | Hiroaki Hayama | 5:01 |
| 2. | "Moon Clock" | Hiroaki Hayama | Hiroaki Hayama | 3:58 |
| 3. | "Forever Memories" (Za Downtown Street Remix) | Hiroaki Hayama | Hiroaki Hayama | 6:09 |
| 4. | "Forever Memories" (Instrumental) | | Hiroaki Hayama | 4:59 |
| Total length: | | | | 20:07 |

== Charts ==
| Release | Chart | Peak position | Total sales |
|---|---|---|---|
| March 14, 2001 | Oricon Singles Chart | 12 | 216,590 |
