= Feel the Fate =

Single by W-inds

from the album 1st Message
- B-side: Will be There ~Koigokoro; Feel the Fate (Za Downtown Groove-Master Remix)
- Released: July 4, 2001
- Recorded: 2001
- Genre: J-pop, hip hop
- Label: Flight Master; CD (PCCA-01547)
- Songwriter: Hiroaki Hayama
- Producer: Hiroaki Hayama

W-inds singles chronology
"Forever Memories" (2001)	"Feel the Fate" (2001)	"Paradox" (2001)

Feel the Fate (stylized as Feel The Fate) is the second single by the three-member Japanese hip-hop group w-inds, released on July 4, 2001. It charted better than their debut single, ranking in the top ten on the Oricon charts at No. 8.

Their success with their previous song, "Forever Memories", along with "Feel the Fate" helped the trio secure the spot for Best Newcomer during the 43rd annual Japan Record Awards at the end of 2001.

== Information ==
Feel the Fate is the second single by Japanese hip-hop group w-inds under the Pony Canyon sub-label Flight Master. It debuted in the top ten on the Oricon Singles Charts at No. 8, and it remained on the charts for ten consecutive weeks. The success of their first three singles helped w-inds to win the Best Newcomer award during the 43rd Japan Record Awards.

The single was released as a standard CD, which contained the title track, the b-side "Will be There ~Koigokoro~" (恋心 / Awakening of Love) and a remix and instrumental to "Feel the Fate." While the music video was released for syndication to the public upon the single's release, it was not available for the public to purchase until their DVD/VHS release Works vo.1 in March 2002.

"Feel the Fate" and the coupling track "Will be There ~Koigokoro~" were written and composed by musical composer Hiroaki Hayama, who was part of the group D-Loop and is now the keyboardist for Tourbillon. Hayama had also composed their debut track, "Forever Memories." The remix for "Feel the Fate" was performed by unit BANANA ICE, whose member Yasushi Sasamoto would work with later would-be labelmates Lead.

== Promotional advertisements ==
To help promote the single, w-inds performed on the Japanese talk show Hey! Hey! Hey! Music Champ.

"Feel the Fate" was utilized as the ending theme for the Nippon TV shows Roppongi Yajukai and the variety program Toriaezu ii Kanji (とりあえずイイ感じ / It Feels Good for the Time Being).

== Track listing ==
CD
No.	Title	Lyrics	Music	Length
1.	"Feel the Fate"	Hiroaki Hayama	Hiroaki Hayama
2.	"Will be There ~Koigokoro~" (恋心 / Awakening of Love)	Hiroaki Hayama	Hiroaki Hayama
3.	"Feel the Fate" (Za Downtown Groove-Master Remix)	Hiroaki Hayama	BANANA ICE
4.	"Feel the Fate" (Instrumental)		Hiroaki Hayama

== Charts ==
Release	Chart	Peak position
July 4, 2001	Oricon Weekly Singles Chart	8
