= W-inds =

Japanese boy band

- Origin: Shibuya, Tokyo, Japan
- Genres: R&B, Hip hop, Dance, J-POP, Raprock
- Years active: 2001–present
- Labels: Pony Canyon; Flight Master
- Members: Ryohei Chiba; Keita Tachibana
- Past members: Ryuichi Ogata
- Website: www.w-inds.tv

W-inds (ウィンズ, Uinzu; pronounced "winds" and stylized as w-inds.) is a Japanese pop boy band managed by Vision Factory and signed to the Pony Canyon label since 2000. The group consists of Ryohei Chiba and Keita Tachibana; Ryuichi Ogata left the group in 2020. Tachibana is the lead singer of the group, while Chiba and Ogata provide backing vocals and rap.

W-inds released their debut single, "Forever Memories", in 2001. They were named "Best New Artists" at the Japan Cable Awards and Japan Record Awards for the release of "Paradox." In addition to selling 5 million copies of CDs in Japan, W-inds has earned numerous awards and accolades from China, Hong Kong, and South Korea.

== History ==
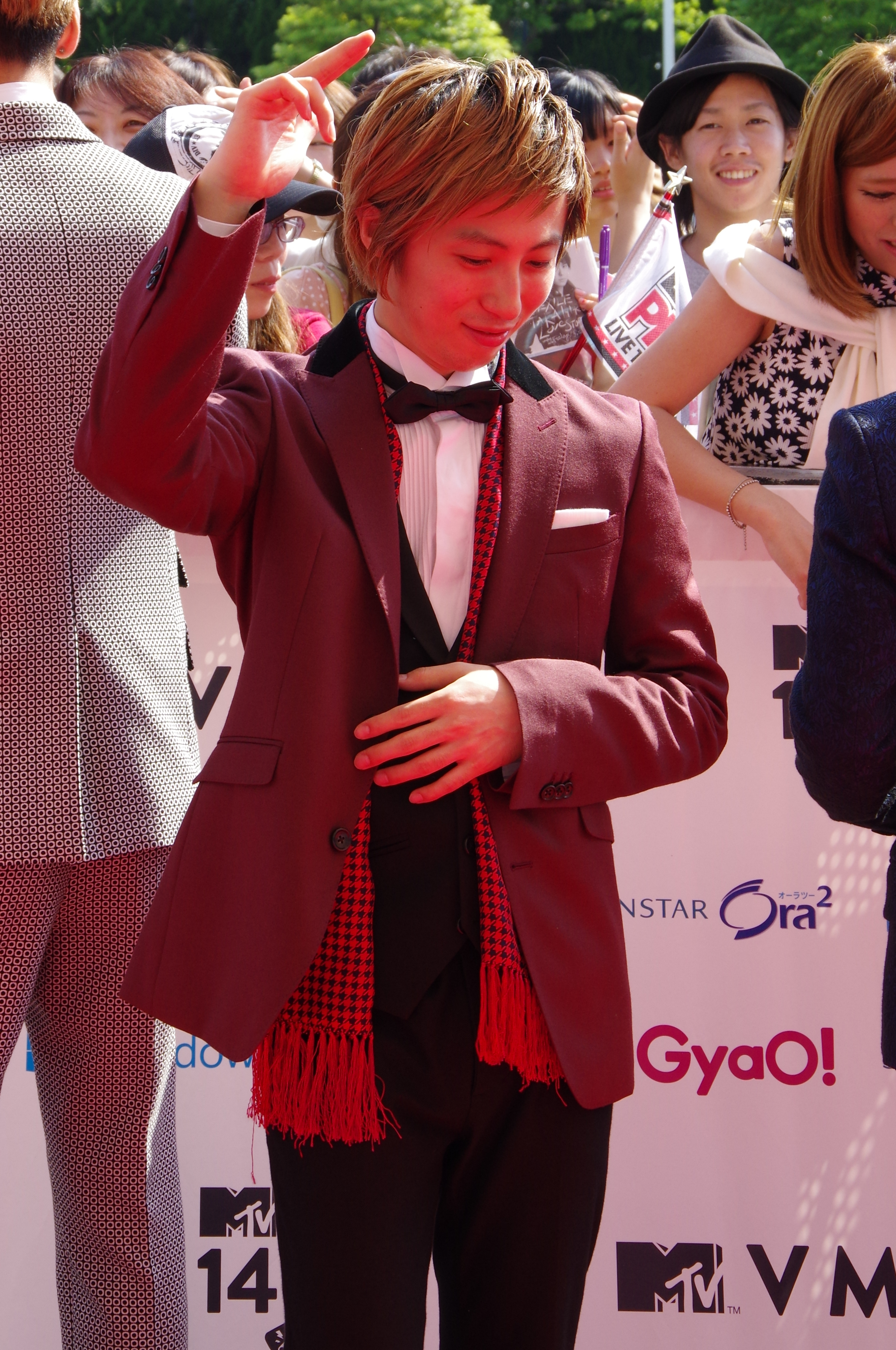
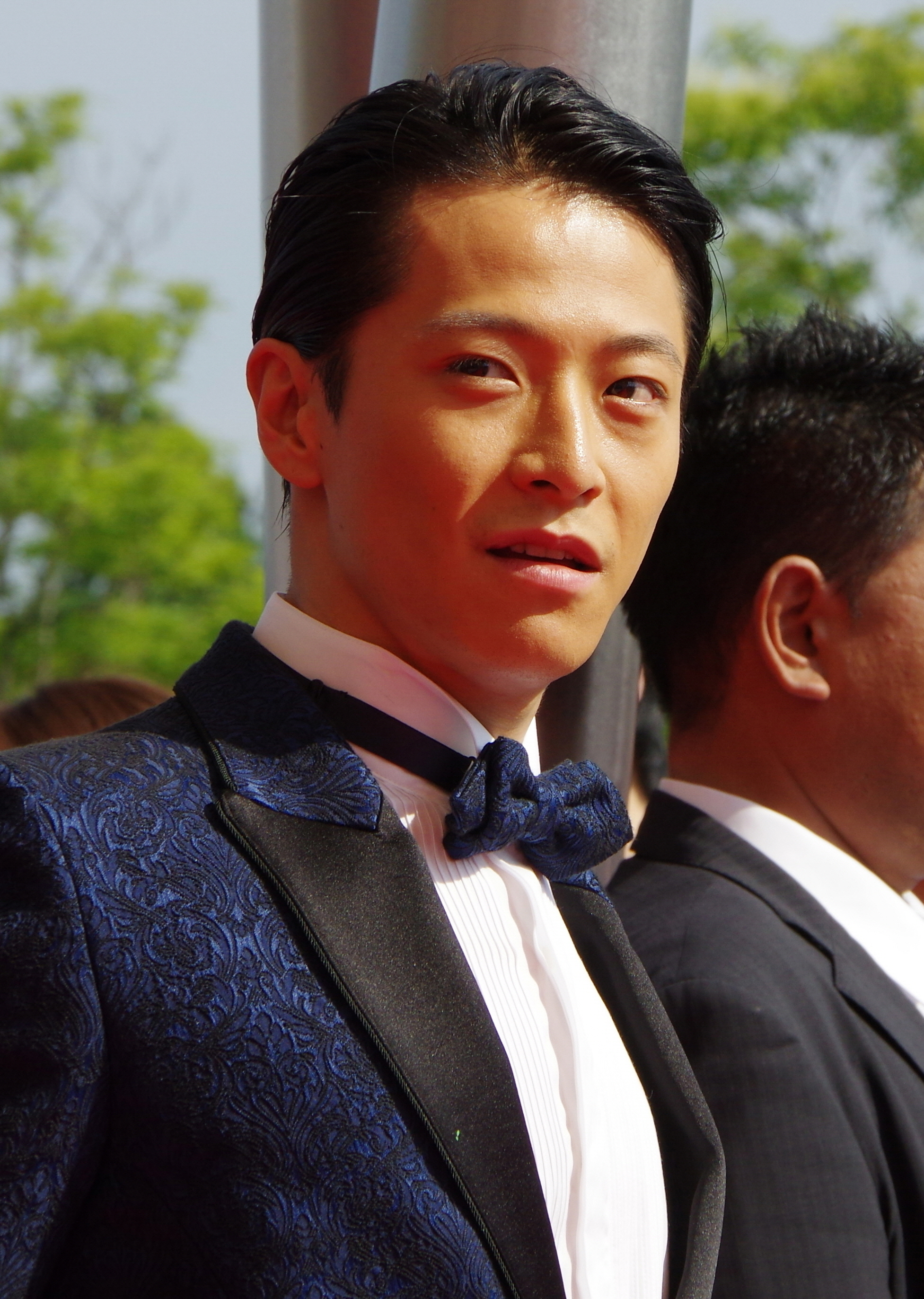
Ryohei Chiba (left) and Ryuichi Ogata (right) at the MTV Video Music Awards Japan in 2014

=== Pre-debut ===
In 2000, Keita Tachibana from Fukuoka passed the Starlight Auditions hosted by Vision Factory and was signed onto their label. In the same year, Ryohei Chiba and Ryuichi Ogata, who attended the same dance school in Sapporo, passed dance auditions to join the group. The three moved to Tokyo to live together, and in November, began street performances in Yoyogi Park and Shibuya to promote their activities.

=== 2001–2002: 1st Message and The System of Alive ===
On March 14, 2001, W-inds released their first single, "Forever Memories", selling 216,590 copies. On June 17, they held their debut showcase at Asahikawa Medical University Medic Festival in Hokkaido. On July 4, 2001, their second single, titled "Feel the Fate", was released and their official website launched on the same day. Filming for the promotional video took place on June 7 and the song was performed live at the international tournament in Yoyogi on August 2, where 7,000 people came to watch. Later that year, W-inds made their first appearance in the movie Star Light, which premiered on October 7 at the Ikebukuro Theater. The movie also featured their third single, "Paradox", which was released on October 17, 2001. Filming for the promotional video took place on September 3. For Paradox, w-inds. was awarded "Best New Artists" in the 43rd Japan Record Awards.

On December 19, 2001, W-inds's first album, 1st Message, was released and debuted at #1 on the Oricon Weekly Albums Charts. For the first time, Chiba and Ogata appeared on some of the song tracks. In 2005, Ogata recalled being unsure with the idea at the time, as both of them generally had little experience in rapping and singing.

On February 6, 2002, W-inds released a behind-the-scenes DVD titled Private of W-inds, which charted at #3 on the Oricon Weekly DVD Chart. The DVD was the best-selling male idol DVD for nine years until 2011. On February 20, 2002, W-inds released their fourth single, titled "Try Your Emotion", which peaked at #2 on the weekly charts. Their fifth single, "Another Days", was released on May 22, 2002, and was used as the song to a commercial from Family Mart. Shortly after, W-inds collaborated with Lead, Flame, and Folder 5 with the single "World Needs Love", released under the collective name Earth Harmony. During the summer, their sixth single, "Because of You" on August 21, 2002, and was the first single apart from their first album to have Ogata rapping. November 13, 2002 saw the release of their seventh single, "New Paradise".

In the same year, w-inds. had their first nationwide tour for their first album, 1st Message. They extended their fanbase by briefly performing in Shanghai, China, as part of their tour. In addition to their activities, w-inds. made a brief cameo in the movie Nurse no Oshigoto The Movie as three soccer players.

At the end of 2002, w-inds. released their second album, The System of Alive on December 18, 2002. Similar to 2001, they promoted it at their Christmas fanclub event. Additionally, they gained the opportunity to perform at Kōhaku Uta Gassen for the first time, where they sang "New Paradise."

=== 2003–2007: Expansion across Asia ===
w-inds. released their eighth single, "Super Lover (I Need You Tonight), on May 21, 2003. On August 21, 2003, they released "Love Is Message", with a musical style that was a departure from the former's dance beat nature. On October 29, 2003, they released "Long Road".

In 2004, Vision Factory included Taiwan as one of their locations for the Prime of Life tour. Following that, w-inds. made their debut in Taiwan. They became the only Japanese group invited to perform on the MTV Mandarin Awards in September 2006.

In 2006, w-inds. made an appearance on Mnet KM Music Festival, a music awards show in South Korea they were the first Japanese artists to ever appear on the show.

w-inds. also took part in a China-Japan music festival in 2006. In March 2007, the group flew to Beijing to participate in another China-Japan music festival along with two other Japanese artists. On July 2, 2007 w-inds. joined the Pop Rock Gala in celebrating the 10th anniversary of the establishment of the Hong Kong Special Administrative Region.

During the end of their Thanks tour, held from the summer of 2007 to the end of the year, w-inds. revealed their upcoming single, "Boogie Woogie 66", and filmed their promotional video at the concerts.

w-inds.' 22nd single, "Love Is the Greatest Thing", was released on July 4, 2007, as the theme song for the Japanese release of Shrek the Third. The song was sampled from De Souza's "Guilty", and peaked at #4, selling 34,416 copies.

=== 2008–2011: Seventh Ave., Another World, 10th anniversary ===
In addition to their first double A side, "Everyday/Can't Get Back", in 2008, on May 13, 2009, w-inds. released another double A side, titled "Rain Is Fallin'/Hybrid Dream". "Rain Is Fallin'" was a collaboration and featured rap verses from G-Dragon from Big Bang, while "Hybrid Dream" was used as the theme song for the program Countdown Document Byo-Yomi! for the month of May. The single peaked at #2 and sold 48,577 copies.

From the summer of 2009 to the end of the year, w-inds. toured venues in Japan with the Sweet Fantasy Tour; in November, the tour extended to Taiwan and Hong Kong. The Hong Kong show pulled in a crowd of 8,000 people. Halfway throughout the tour, the concert held at Kanagawa, Omiya had to be truncated due to Tachibana falling ill.

W-inds released another double A-side single "New World/Truth (Saigo no Shinjitsu)" on December 9, 2009. The single debuted at #2 on the Oricon Weekly Charts. "Truth (Saigo no Shinjitsu)" was composed by the American singer and songwriters Ne-Yo and B. Howard, who acknowledged their talent after coming across their act. The promotional video for "Truth (Saigo no Shinjitsu)" was filmed during W-inds' stay in Hong Kong for the Sweet Fantasy Tour. The b-side to the single was titled "Tribute" and was a tribute to Michael Jackson.

=== 2012–present: Blue Blood, Timeless, and 100 ===
In 2012, W-inds took a brief hiatus to focus on their own individual projects. During this time, Tachibana relaunched his solo career, Chiba performed in dance showcases with Kenzo from Da Pump, and Ogata formed the rock band All City Steppers. On October 31, 2013, W-inds returned with the single "A Little Bit."

On June 1, 2020, Ogata withdrew from the group due to psychosomatic disorder.

== Musical style ==
From their debut, w-inds.' musical style was mainly bubblegum pop, as it was the trend at the time. Tachibana, whose parents are both DJs, listened to American music growing up. Their sixth single, Because of you, was even mentioned to have an "American style" to it. From 2003 onward, w-inds. moved on from lighthearted pop beats into more mellow ballads with mature lyrics in accordance to their growing image. At the end of 2008, w-inds. transitioned into dance beats.

== Other activities and endorsements ==
w-inds. hosted a long-running radio show titled w-inds.' Windy Street (ウィンズのWindy Street, Uinzu no Windy Street), which lasted from 2001 to 2008. From 2003 to 2007, they appeared in commercials for Bourbon Gum, with each new single playing in every new commercial.

In 2002, manga artist Natsume Hirose wrote and illustrated a manga titled Tokyo Style Bomb (東京スタイル爆弾, Tōkyō Sutairu Bakudan), which starred w-inds. as side characters. The manga lasted for three volumes and was serialized in Bessatsu Margaret.

They performed the theme song for the Japanese version of Shrek the Third, called "Love is the Greatest Thing".

== Discography ==
Studio albums

- 1st Message (2001)
- The System of Alive (2002)
- Prime of Life (2003)
- Ageha (2005)
- Thanks (2006)
- Journey (2007)
- Seventh Avenue (2008)
- Another World (2010)
- Move Like This (2012)
- Timeless (2014)
- Blue Blood (2016)
- Invisible (2017)
- 100 (2018)
- 20XX: We Are (2021)
- Beyond (2023)
- Winderlust (2025)

Compilation albums

- W-inds BesTracks (2004)
- W-inds Single Collection Best Eleven (2008)
- W-inds 10th Anniversary Best Album: We Dance For Everyone (2011)
- W-inds 10th Anniversary Best Album: We Sing For You (2011)

== Filmography ==
=== Films ===
Year	Title	Notes
2001	Star Light	Cameo
2002	Nurse no Oshigoto: The Movie	Cameo
2005	W-inds.tv	Documentary film; 37,614 copies sold

=== Radio ===
Year	Title	Notes
2000-2008	w-inds.'s Windy Street	

== Publications ==
1. W-inds: First Pictorial (30 September 2001)
2. W-inds "Move!" (18 January 2002)
3. W-inds The Stage! (20 September 2002)
4. W-inds Keita – 1st personal photobook (1 November 2002)
5. W-inds Ryohei – 1st personal photobook (22 November 2002)
6. W-inds Ryuichi – 1st personal photobook (6 December 2002)
7. W-inds Meets Junon (13 September 2003)
8. W-inds Tour (8 October 2004)
9. W-inds Live Tour "Ageha" The Document (28 October 2005)
10. W-inds Vacanza (4 August 2006)
11. Triangle: W-inds Meets Junon 2 (26 October 2007)

== Tours ==
- W-inds 1st Live Tour: 1st Message
- W-inds: The System of Alive Tour 2003
- W-inds: Prime of Life Tour 2004
- W-inds Live Tour 2005: Ageha
- W-inds Live Tour 2006: Thanks
- W-inds Live Tour 2007: Journey
- W-inds Live Tour 2008: Seventh Ave.
- W-inds Live Tour 2009: Sweet Fantasy
- W-inds Live Tour 2010: Another World
- W-inds 10th Anniversary: Three Fourteen
- W-inds Best Live Tour 2011 Final at Nippon Budokan
- W-inds Live Tour: Awake at Nippon Budokan
- W-inds Live Tour 2014: Timeless
- W-inds Live Tour 2015: Blue Blood
- W-inds 15th Anniversary Live Tour 2016: Forever Memories

== Awards and accolades ==
Year	Award	Category	Nominated work	Result
2001	34th Japan Cable Awards	Best New Artist Award	"Paradox"	Won
2001	43rd Japan Record Awards	Best New Artist Award	"Paradox"	Won
2002	44th Japan Record Awards	Gold Award	"Because of You"	Won
2002	39th Golden Arrow Award	Music Newcomer Award	W-inds	Won
2002	16th Japan Gold Disc Award	New Artist of the Year	W-inds	Won
2003	45th Japan Record Awards	Gold Award	"Long Road"	Won
2004	Yahoo! Hong Kong Buzz Music Awards	Best International Group	W-inds	Won
2004	IFPI Hong Kong Top Sales Music Awards	Best Sales Release (Japan and Korea)	Prime of Life	Won
2004	IFPI Hong Kong Top Sales Music Awards	Best Sales Release (Japan and Korea)	W-inds. BesTracks	Won
2005	47th Japan Record Awards	Gold Award	"Izayoi no Tsuki"	Won
2005	Yahoo! Hong Kong Buzz Music Awards	Best International Group	W-inds	Won
2005	IFPI Hong Kong Top Sales Music Awards	Best Sales Release (Japan and Korea)	Ageha	Won
2006	39th Japan Cable Awards	Music Award	W-inds	Won
2006	47th Japan Record Awards	Gold Award	"Boogie Woogie 66"	Won
2006	MTV Student Voice Awards 2006	Best Dance Artist Award	W-inds	Won
2006	2006 China and Taiwan Hito Popularity Music Award	Best Pop Song	"Kirei Da"	Won
2006	MTV Channel Mandarin Awards	Most Popular Group (Japan)	W-inds	Won
2006	MTV Channel Mandarin Awards	Special Award (12 million CDs sold)	W-inds	Won
2006	Mnet KM Music Festival 2006	Best Asia Pop Artist	W-inds	Won
2006	Yahoo! Hong Kong Buzz Music Awards	Best International Group	W-inds	Won
2006	IFPI Hong Kong Top Sales Music Awards	Best Sales Release (Japan and Korea)	Thanks	Won
2007	49th Japan Record Awards	Gold Award	"Love is the Greatest Thing"	Won
2007	MTV Student Voice Awards 2007	Best Celebrity Student Voice Group Award	W-inds	Won
2007	18th RTHK International Pop Poll Awards	Top Japanese Artist/Group	W-inds	Won
2007	Yahoo! Hong Kong Buzz Music Awards	Best International Group	W-inds	Won
2008	IFPI Hong Kong Top Sales Music Awards	Best Sales Release (Japan and Korea)	Journey	Won
2008	5th Asia Song Festival	Best Asian Artist Award (Japan)	W-inds	Won
2008	50th Japan Record Awards	Gold Award	"Ame Ato"	Won
2009	IFPI Hong Kong Top Sales Music Awards	Best Sales Release (Japan and Korea)	Single Collection: Best Eleven	Won
2009	IFPI Hong Kong Top Sales Music Awards	Best Sales Release (Japan and Korea)	Seventh Ave.	Won
2009	51st Japan Record Awards	Excellence Work Award	"Rain is Fallin'" (with G-Dragon)	Won
2010	MTV World Stage VMAJ 2010	Best Collaboration Video Award	"Rain is Fallin'"	Won
2010	51st Japan Record Awards	Excellence Work Award	"New World"	Won
2011	IFPI Hong Kong Top Sales Music Awards	Best Sales Release (Japan and Korea)	Another World	Won
2011	22nd RTHK International Pop Poll Award	Top Japanese Gold Song	"Addicted to Love"	Won
2012	IFPI Hong Kong Top Sales Music Awards	Best Sales Release (Japan and Korea)	W-inds 10th Anniversary Best Album	Won
2013	IFPI Hong Kong Top Sales Music Awards	Best Sales Release (Japan and Korea)	Move Like This	Won
2015	IFPI Hong Kong Top Sales Music Awards	Best Sales Release (Japan and Korea)	Timeless	Won
2015	19th China Music Awards	Asian Most Influential Japanese Singer	W-inds	Won
2016	IFPI Hong Kong Top Sales Music Awards	Best Sales Release (Japan and Korea)	Blue Blood	Won
2016	27th RTHK International Pop Poll Award	Top Artist/Group (Japan)	W-inds	Won
2016	27th RTHK International Pop Poll Award	Top Japanese Gold Song	"In Love with the Music"	Won
2017	28th RTHK International Pop Poll Award	Top Artist/Group (Japan)	W-inds	Won
2017	28th RTHK International Pop Poll Award	Top Japanese Gold Song	"Boom Word Up"	Won
2018	29th RTHK International Pop Poll Award	Top Japanese Gold Song	"Time Has Gone"	Won

== See also ==
- List of bands from Japan

Preceded by Kiyoshi Hikawa	Japan Record Award for Best New Artist; 2001	Succeeded by Mika Nakashima
