= New World / Truth (Saigo no Shinjitsu) =

"New World/Truth (Saigo no Shinjitsu) New World/Truth ～最後の真実～"

Single by W-inds
- Released: December 9, 2009
- Genre: J-Pop
- Label: Pony Canyon
- Songwriter(s): Shungo., Ryouske Imai, Shaffer Smith (Ne-Yo), Brandon Howard, Zetton, Carl Sahlin, Erik Lidbom
- Producer(s): Ryouske Imai, Shaffer Smith (Ne-Yo), Brandon Howard, Yukihiro Sakakibara

W-inds singles chronology
"Rain Is Fallin'/Hybrid Dream" (2009)	"New World/Truth (Saigo no Shinjitsu); New World/Truth ～最後の真実～" (2009)	"Addicted to Love" (2010)

"New World/Truth (Saigo no Shinjitsu)" (New World/Truth ～最後の真実～) is a double-A side single released as the 27th single of Japanese pop band W-inds.

== Music video ==
Ryohei Chiba and Ryuichi Ogata choreographed the dance.

== Track listing ==
1. "New World"
2. "Truth (Saigo no Shinjitsu)"
3. "Fighting for Love"
4. "Tribute"
5. "New World (Radio Mix)"

== Media appearances ==
- "New World" was used as the ending theme for the second season of House M.D. in Japan
- "Truth (Saigo no Shinjitsu)" was used as the beginning theme for Arabiki Dan (あらびき団)

== Charts and sales ==
=== Oricon sales charts (Japan) ===
Release	Chart	Peak position	Sales total	Chart run
December 9, 2009	Oricon Daily Chart	2	16,704	2 weeks
December 9, 2009	Oricon Weekly Chart	2	37,915	1 week
December 9, 2009	Oricon Monthly Chart	-	-	-
December 9, 2009	Oricon Yearly Chart	-	-	-
