= Ryuichi Ogata =

- 緒方龍一
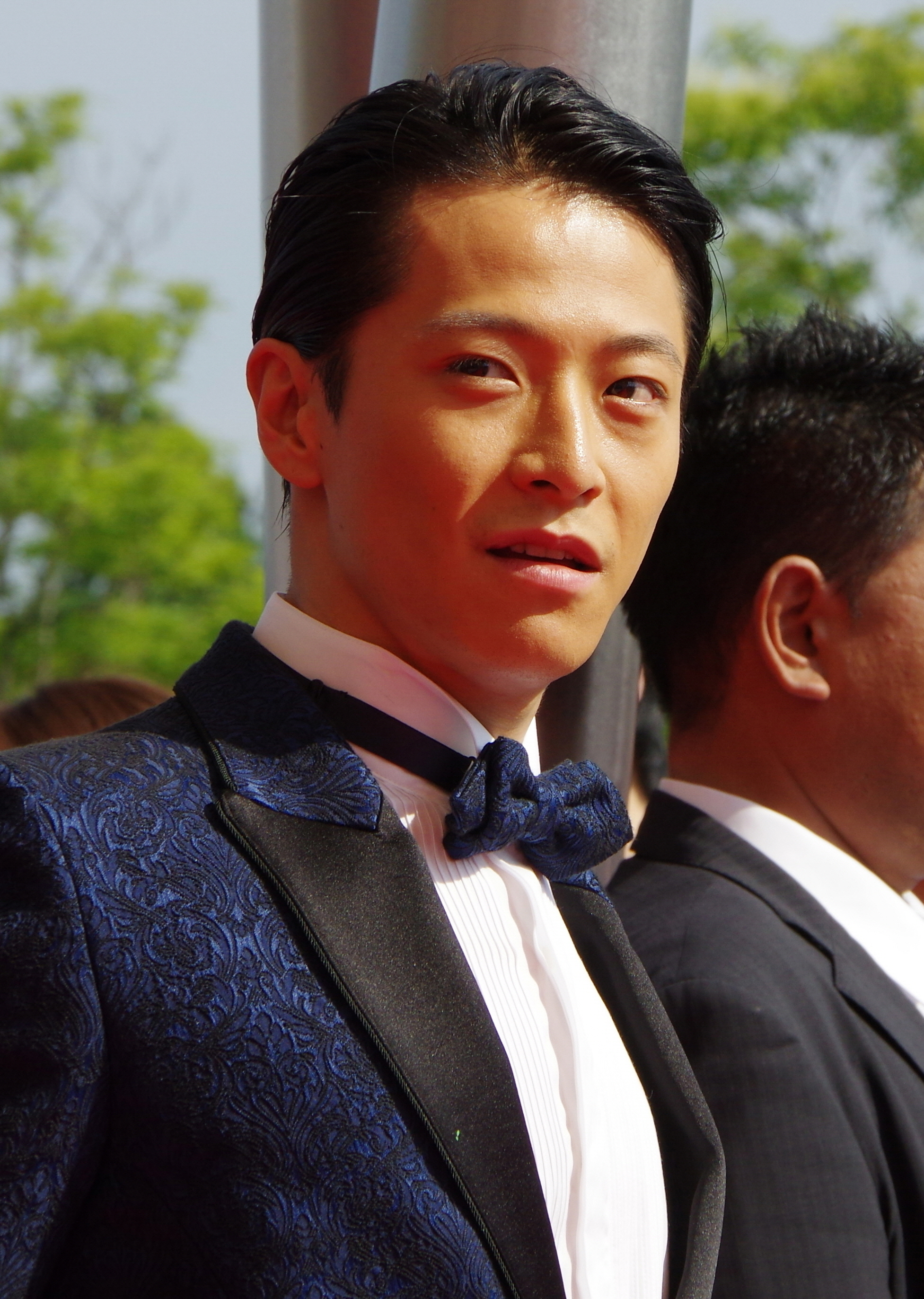
- Ryuichi Ogata at 2014 MTV Video Music Awards Japan
- Born: December 17, 1985 (age 40); Sapporo, Hokkaidō, Japan
- Other names: Ryuichi; Dravil
- Occupations: Singer; rapper; guitarist
- Years active: 2001–2020; 2021-present
- Musical career
- Genres: J-pop; rock
- Instruments: Vocals; guitar
- Member of: All City Steppers
- Formerly of: W-inds; Radio Foundation
- Website: www.ryuichiogata.com

Ryuichi Ogata (緒方 龍一, Ogata Ryūichi; born December 17, 1985), also known mononymously as Ryuichi or Dravil, is a Japanese singer, rapper, and guitarist. In 2001, he rose to fame as a member of the Japanese boy band W-inds as the group's dancer, back-up vocalist, and rapper. In addition to his activities with W-inds, Ogata also played guitar and provided back-up vocals for the rock bands Radio Foundation and All City Steppers.

In 2020, Ogata briefly retired from the entertainment industry from health problems. In 2021, he returned as a solo singer, performing under the stage name Dravil.

== Career ==
=== 2001-2020: W-inds, Radio Foundation, and All City Steppers ===
Ogata began taking dance classes at Sapporo with his older sister and met Ryohei Chiba there. In 2000, Ogata, along with Chiba, passed auditions held at their dance school to join Keita Tachibana and form the boy band w-inds. Although initially chosen to be a dancer, Ogata later contributed to their songs as a back-up vocal and rapper. During the Prime of Life Tour in 2004, Ogata rapped and sang his first and only solo song, "Energy."

Ogata joined independent rock band Radio Foundation in 2006 as their lead guitarist. Shortly after he left in 2009, Radio Foundation's lead vocalist and rhythm guitarist Kenma Miyaoku died from a heart attack on July 12, 2009, prior to recording their debut album. Radio Foundation released the music video for "Brain Washing", directed by Shota Matsuda, as a tribute to Miyaoku a year after his death. Ogata paid tribute to him at W-inds's 2010 concerts.

In 2013, Ogata formed the rock band All City Steppers with guitarist and vocalist Leo Imamura from the band The John's Guerilla, and his childhood friend, bassist Ryuki Maeda from the band Terror Familia. He was reacquainted with both of them during Miyaoku's funeral. Ogata provided guitar and backing vocals for the band. Their debut single, "Precious Girl", was released on August 21, 2013, and peaked at No. 31 on the Oricon Weekly Singles Chart. Their first album, Sexy Virgin Riot, was released on March 5, 2014, and peaked at No. 36 on the Oricon Weekly Albums Chart.

On June 1, 2020, Ogata announced that he was retiring from entertainment due to developing a psychosomatic disorder, leaving him prone to experiencing stress and anxiety.

=== 2021-present: Solo career ===
In March 2021, Ogata announced he was returning to the entertainment industry under the stage name Dravil, releasing his debut solo single "All Together" / "Reborn."

== Filmography ==
=== Films ===
Year	Title	Role	Notes
2001	Star Light	Himself	Cameo
2002	Nurse no Oshigoto: The Movie	Soccer player	Cameo

=== Radio ===
Year	Title	Notes
2000–2008	w-inds.'s Windy Street	
