= 43rd Japan Record Awards =

2001 Japanese music awards ceremony

- Date: 31 December 2001
- Venue: TBS B-Studio, Tokyo
- Hosted by: Masaaki Sakai, Ryoko Yonekura

Television/radio coverage
- Network: TBS

The 43rd Annual Japan Record Awards took place on 31 December 2001, starting at 6:00PM JST. The primary ceremonies were televised in Japan on TBS.

== Award winners ==
=== Japan Record Award ===
- "Dearest" by Ayumi Hamasaki (Composer: D.A.I and Ayumi Hamasaki; Lyrics: Ayumi Hamasaki; Arrangement: Naoto Suzuki; Producer: Max Matsuura)

=== Best Album Award ===
- Love Notes by The Gospellers

=== Best Singer Award ===
- Hisami Tagawa

=== Best Newcomer Award ===
- w-inds.

=== Composition Award ===
- Kazuhito Kikuchi for "Fragile" by Every Little Thing

=== Lyricist Award ===
- Chihiro Onitsuka for "Vertigo" by Chihiro Onitsuka

=== Arrangement Award ===
- Megumi Wakakusa for "Yume no Hate ~Meridian Dream~" by Sachiko Kobayashi

=== Tadashi Yoshida Award ===
- Masato Sugimoto

=== Gold Medal ===
- "Fragile" by Every Little Thing (Composer: Kazuhito Kikuchi; Lyrics: Kaori Mochida; Arrangement: Ichiro Ito, Genya Kuwashima, and Kazuhito Kikuchi)
- "Taiga no Nagare" by Miyuki Kawanaka (Producer: Yasuhiro Senga; Composer: Tetsuya Gen; Lyrics: Osamu Yoshioka; Arrangement: Toshiaki Maeda)
- "Always and Again and Again" by Yumi Kimura (Composer: Yumi Kimura; Lyrics: Wakako Kaku; Producer: Joe Hisaishi)
- "White Lovers" by Keisuke Kuwata (Composers, lyrics, and arrangement: Keisuke Kuwata and Ken Shima)
- "Uminari" by Toshimi Tagawa (Composer: Jun Suzuki; Lyrics: Keiko Yuki; Arrangement: Toshiaki Maeda; Producer: Kunio Saito)
- "Steppin' and Shakin'" by DA PUMP (Composer, arrangement, and producer: Akio Togashi; Lyrics: mcA T & KEN)
- "Spring Has Come" by Yoshimi Tendo (Composer: Koji Tokuhisa; Lyrics: Hajime Tateishi; Arrangement: Takaharu Ikeda; Producer: Jun Ikeda)
- "Dearest" by Ayumi Hamasaki (Composer: D.A.I and Ayumi Hamasaki; Lyrics: Ayumi Hamasaki; Arrangement: Naoto Suzuki; Producer: Max Matsuura)
- "Because It's the First Time in Three Years" by Yuri Harada (Composer: Shunichi Makaino; Lyrics: Yomi Asako; Arrangement: Tatsuya Nango; Producer: Kenji Oku)
- "Oi Chasing Otojiro" by Kiyoshi Hikawa (Composer: Hideo Mizumori; Lyrics: Yurio Matsui; Arrangement: Norio Ito; Producer: Kunio Saito)
- "IS IT YOU?" by Hitomi (Composer: Kosuke Morimoto; Lyrics: Hitomi; Arrangement and producer: Zentaro Watanabe)
- "Your innocence" by Hiro (Composer, lyrics, and arrangement: Takusuke Hayama)

=== New Face Award ===
- w-inds.
- Shinobu Otowa
- ZONE

=== Planning Award ===
- Dreams Still Go Round ~ Nursery Rhymes Sung By Shoichi Ozawa by Shoichi Ozawa
- Love ☆ Arigatou by Kim Young Ja
- Hiroshi World Goldies by Hiroshi
- Score of Love by Toru Funamura

=== Distinguished Service Award ===
- Saburo Kitajima
- Sadao Watanabe

=== Special Prize ===
- "There will be tomorrow" by Re:Japan
- "ZERO LANDMINE" by NML

=== Special Award ===
- Toru Funamura

=== Special Achievement Award ===
- Hibari Misora
