= Rain Is Fallin' / Hybrid Dream =

"Rain Is Fallin'/Hybrid Dream"

Single by W-inds
- Released: May 17, 2009
- Genre: J-Pop
- Label: Pony Canyon
- Songwriter(s): Shungo., Jakob Oloffson, Magnus Lidehäll, Bachlogi], J-Son, Supreme, Donald Mclean, Andrea Martin, Lucas Secon
- Producer(s): Jakob Oloffson, Magnus Lidehäll, Bachlogic

W-inds singles chronology
"Everyday/Can't Get Back" (2009)	"Rain Is Fallin'/Hybrid Dream" (2009)	"New World/Truth (Saigo no Shinjitsu)" (2009)

G-Dragon singles chronology
"Rain Is Fallin'/Hybrid Dream" (2009)	"Heartbreaker" (2009)

Music video
- "I Need a Girl" on YouTube

Rain Is Fallin'/Hybrid Dream is the 26th single by Japanese pop group W-inds.

== Information ==
The single was produced by Swedish producer Jakob Oloffson, Magnus Lidehäll from Swedish hip hop crew Afasi & Filthy, and Japanese hip hop producer and artist Bachlogic, among others. W-inds also collaborated with South Korean group BigBang's G-Dragon, helping to launch BigBang's career in Japan. The single was W-inds's second consecutive top 3 single on the Oricon Weekly Single's chart, marking a comeback, and it also hit #1 on the Daily Singles chart. It also won Excellent Work Award at the 51st Japan Record Awards.

== Track listing ==
1. "Rain Is Fallin'"
2. "Hybrid Dream"
3. "Upside Down"
4. "You Are"

== Charts and sales ==
=== Oricon sales charts (Japan) ===
Release	Chart	Peak position	Sales total
December 9, 2009	Oricon Daily Chart	1	22,000
December 9, 2009	Oricon Weekly Chart	2	48,577
