= Keita Tachibana =

Japanese singer and actor

- 橘 慶太
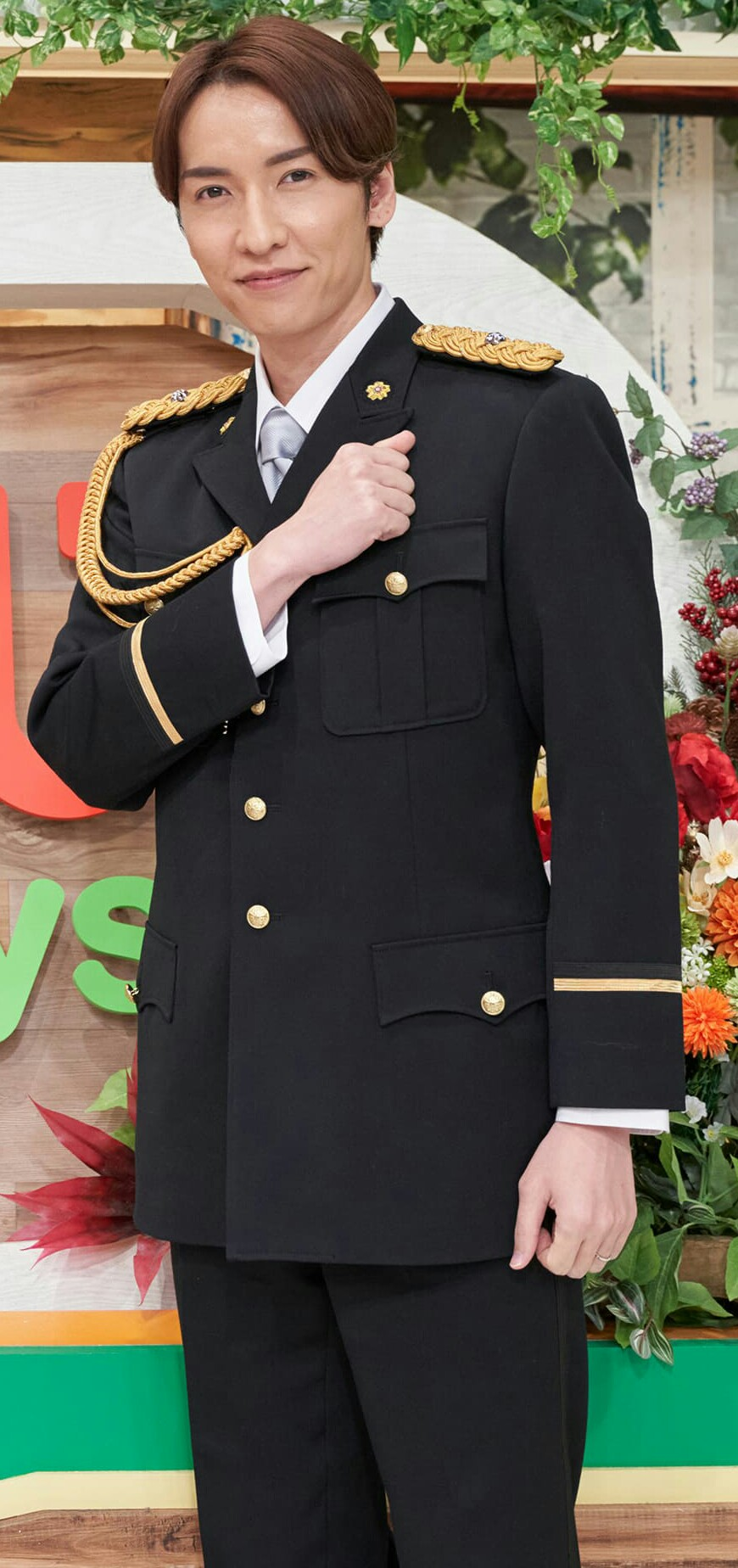
- Tachibana in 2020
- Born: 16 December 1985 (age 40)
- Other name: Keita
- Occupations: Singer; actor
- Spouse: Aya Matsuura (m. 2013)
- Children: 3
- Relatives: Mio Tachibana (sister)
- Musical career
- Genres: J-pop; R&B; dance-pop
- Instrument: Vocals
- Years active: 2000–present
- Labels: Pony Canyon; Vision Factory
- Member of: W-inds
- Website: keita-official.tv

Keita Tachibana (橘 慶太, Tachibana Keita; born on 16 December 1985), also known mononymously as Keita (stylized KEITA), is a Japanese singer and actor. Since 2000, he rose to fame as the lead vocalist from the boy band W-inds. During that time, he launched a solo career, and in 2012, has revitalized it again under a reinvented image.

In addition to music, Tachibana also launched an acting career and has appeared in television dramas such as Ohitorisama and Mattsugu.

== Career ==
At age 14, Tachibana was only male finalist in the 2000 Kyushu-Okinawa Starlight Audition. Afterwards, he was scouted and became part of W-inds with Ryuichi Ogata and Ryohei Chiba. In addition to his singing and dancing talents, Keita plays keyboard and guitar.

=== Solo career ===
In addition to Tachibana's activities in W-inds, he launched a solo career, with his debut single "Michishirube" releasing on 18 October 2006. "Michishirube" served as the first ending theme to the anime Reborn! and debuted at No. 3 on the Oricon Weekly Singles Chart. Shortly after the release of "Michishirube", Tachibana's first solo album, Koe, was released on 29 November 2006, and debuted at No. 5 in the first week on Oricon Weekly Albums Chart. Following its success, Tachibana's second single, "Friend", was released in May 2007 as the first opening theme song to the anime Blue Dragon.

In 2007, Tachibana voiced Prince Arthur in the Japanese dubbed version of Shrek the Third, as his first starring role. In 2009, he played Hiroyuki Harada in the television drama Ohitorisama.

Late in 2012, Tachibana announced his intent to restart his solo career, this time under a mononymous, romanized stage name, Keita. His first single under his new name, "Slide 'n' Step", released on 20 February 2013.

== Personal life ==
Tachibana is the second oldest of four siblings. He is the older brother of model, actress, and former singer Mio Tachibana.

On 4 August 2013, Tachibana announced he registered his marriage to Aya Matsuura after almost 12 years of dating. Their wedding ceremony was held in Oahu, Hawaii on 7 October. On 24 December 2014, Tachibana and Matsuura announced via their agencies that they gave birth to a girl. In July 2018, Tachibana announced the birth of his second child. On 9 December 2020, he announced that his wife gave birth to their third child.

== Discography ==
=== Albums ===
Title	Details	Peak chart positions	Sales
Title	Details	JPN	Sales
Koe (声)	Released: 29 November 2006; Label: Pony Canyon; Formats: CD	5	40,000
Side by Side (as KEITA)	Released: 5 June 2013; Label: Flight Master; Formats: CD	4	14,000

=== Extended plays ===
Title	Details	Peak chart positions	Sales
Title	Details	JPN	Sales
Fragments (as KEITA)	Released: 16 December 2015; Label: Pony Canyon; Formats: CD	26	

=== Singles ===
Title	Year	Peak chart positions	Sales	Album
Title	Year	JPN	Sales	Album
"Michishirube" (道標)	2006	3	48,725	Koe
"Friend"	2007	4	21,858	
"Slide 'n' Step" (as KEITA)	2013	6		Side by Side

=== Promotional singles ===
Title	Year	Peak chart positions	Sales	Album
Title	Year	JPN	Sales	Album
"Slide 'n' Step (Extended Mix)" (featuring Sky-Hi (AAA))	2013			Side by Side
"I'll Be There" (featuring Ms. Ooja and Spicy Chocolate)	2015			Fragments
"Lost & Found" (Taeil featuring Keita (w-inds.))	2017			Block B Project-1

== Filmography ==
=== Films ===
Year	Title	Role	Notes
2001	Star Light	Himself	Cameo
2002	Nurse no Oshigoto: The Movie	Soccer player	Cameo
2007	Shrek the Third	Artie	Japanese dub
2009	Baby! Baby! Baby!	Shop attendant	Cameo

=== Television ===
Year	Title	Role	Notes
2009	Ohitorisama	Hiroyuki Harada	Supporting role
2010	Mattsugu	Seiji	Lead role
2012	Answer	Junpei Karasawa	

=== Radio ===
Year	Title	Notes
2000–2008	w-inds.'s Windy Street	
2006	Keita Tachibana All Night Nippon	
2009	Radio Session: Keita Tachibana from w-inds.'s Free Style Show	

== Tours ==
- Keita Side By Side Tour 2013 (2013)

== Awards and accolades ==
Year	Award	Category	Nominated work	Result
2006	CyberAgent Blog of the Year Award	N/A	Keita Tachibana	Won
2014	IFPI Hong Kong Top Sales Music Awards	Best Seller Release of Japan and Korea	Side by Side	Won
