= Flame (band) =

Japanese boy band

- Also known as: Emalf
- Origin: Tokyo, Japan
- Genres: J-pop
- Years active: 2001–2010, 2012
- Label: Pony Canyon
- Past members: Yusuke Izaki; Hisato Izaki; Yu Kitamura; Seigo Noguchi; Kyohei Kaneko

Flame (stylized as FLAME) was a Japanese boy band formed in 2001 by Vision Factory. On March 1, 2010, they disbanded.

== Career ==
Flame debuted in 2001 with their single "Mune no Kodō." Prior to debut, all four members had participated in the Junon Super Boy Contest. The group steadily released singles until their first album was released in late 2002 after four singles. A fifth single followed that in March 2003, but it was a different image and sound for the boy band. After their sixth single, "Venus", their releases became sporadic. In 2004, Kaneko left Flame to pursue a solo career. Seigo Noguchi was announced as a new member during Flame's fan club meeting on December 24, 2004, along with "Shake You Down" releasing as a new single on February 16, 2005. "Shake You Down" was used as the ending theme songs to Shōnen Champloo and Saruche. On March 1, 2010, Flame announced through their official website that they were disbanding.

3 years after disbandment, on March 1, 2013, all five former members of Flame announced they were forming a new group, Emalf. Emalf later disbanded on November 27, 2015.

== Members ==
- Yusuke Izaki (伊崎 右典)
- Hisato Izaki (伊崎 央登)
- Yu Kitamura (北村 悠)
- Seigo Noguchi (野口 征吾)
- Kyohei Kaneko (金子 恭平)

== Discography ==
=== Studio albums ===
List of studio albums, with selected chart positions, sales figures and certifications
Title	Year	Album details	Peak chart positions	Sales
Title	Year	Album details	JPN	Sales
Boys' Quest	2002	Released: October 30, 2002; Label: Pony Canyon; Formats: CD	7	—
Flame Style	2004	Released: August 18, 2004; Label: Pony Canyon; Formats: CD	15	—
"—" denotes releases that did not chart or were not released in that region.

=== Singles ===
List of singles, with selected chart positions, sales figures and certifications
Title	Year	Peak chart positions	Sales	Album
Title	Year	JPN	Sales	Album
"Mune no Kodō" (ムネノコドウ)	2001	9	—	Boys' Quest
"Bye My Love"	2002	6	—	Boys' Quest
"What Can I Do?"	2002	8	—	Boys' Quest
"Truly"	2002	6	—	Boys' Quest
"Remind"	2003	10	—	Flame Style
"Venus"	2003	6	—	Flame Style
"Fundamental Loop"	2004	14	—	Flame Style
"Shake You Down"	2005	18	—	Non-album single
"Hanashitaku wa Nai" (離したくはない)	2006	31	—	Non-album single
"—" denotes releases that did not chart or were not released in that region.

=== VHS/DVD ===
- [2002.12.18] Boys' Box
- [2003.03.19] Boys' Step
- [2003.09.03] Boys' Box 2
