= Ginuwine discography =

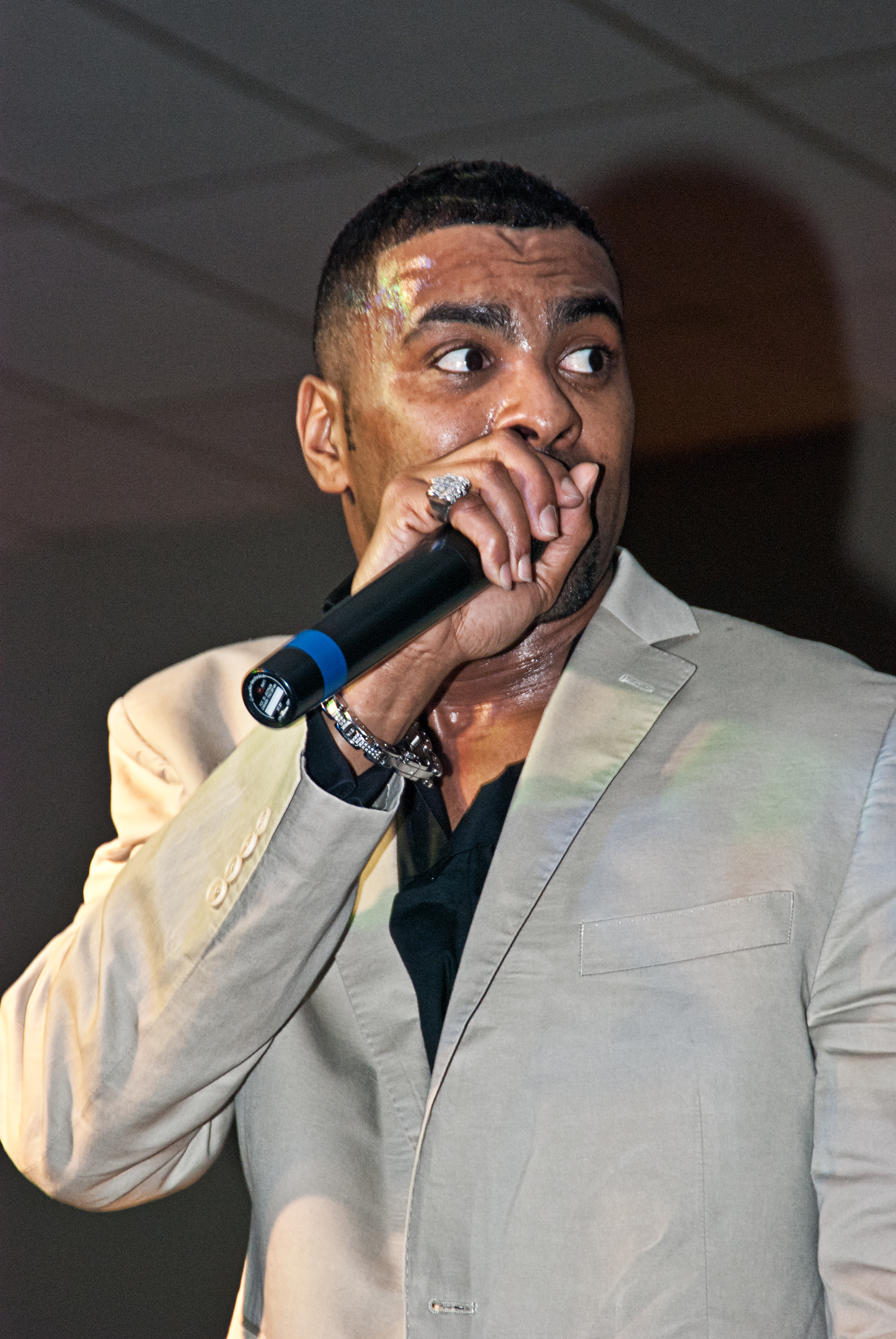
- Studio albums: 7
- Compilation albums: 4
- Singles: 36
- Video albums: 1
- Music videos: 32
- Christmas albums: 1

American R&B singer Ginuwine has released seven studio albums, 36 singles and four compilation albums. He has sold more than 6.98 million albums in the United States. Originally a member of the musical collective Swing Mob in the early 1990s, he made his debut as a solo act with his 1996 debut album Ginuwine... the Bachelor, released through 550 Music and Epic Records. Chiefly produced by Timbaland, it became a top thirty success in the United States, where it was eventually certified 2× Platinum by the Recording Industry Association of America (RIAA) and culminated domestic sales in excess of 2.0 million units. The album produced a number of singles, including the worldwide hit single "Pony," follow-up "Tell Me Do U Wanna," and "When Doves Cry," a Prince cover.

In 1998, Ginuwine's single "Same Ol' G" from the soundtrack of the film Dr. Dolittle (1998) became a top 20 success in the Netherlands. It was later included on his second album 100% Ginuwine, released in March 1999. The album peaked at number five on the Billboard 200 and number two on the Top R&B/Hip-Hop Albums chart. As with The Bachelor, it was certified 2× Platinum in the United States, where it sold more than 2.0 million copies. "So Anxious," the project's third single, became its biggest hit, reaching number 16 on the US Billboard Hot 100 and number two on the Hot R&B/Hip-Hop Songs chart.

In 2001, after a period of personal tragedy, Ginuwine released his third studio album The Life. Introducing a major shift of his trademark sound due to Timbaland's absence on the album, it opened at number three on the US Billboard 200, becoming his highest-charting album yet. It reached Gold status in October of the same year, while sales amounted to just under 1.4 million units. Lead single "Differences" became Ginuwine's highest-charting single since "Pony," reaching number four on the Billboard Hot 100. It also charted internationally, reaching number two in the Netherlands, while also peaking at number 20 on the New Zealand Singles Chart.

In 2002, Ginuwine appeared alongside P. Diddy on "I Need a Girl (Part Two)" from Bad Boy Records' remix album, We Invented the Remix (2002). Issued as a single, it became top five hit in Canada, the United Kingdom and the United States. The same year, "Stingy," the lead single from the Barbershop soundtrack, peaked at number 33 on the Billboard Hot 100 and reached the top ten of the Hot R&B/Hip-Hop Songs chart. The following year, Ginuwine's fourth album The Senior was released. The album debuted at number six on the US Billboard 200 and became his first album to reach the top spot on the Top R&B/Hip-Hop Albums chart. With US sales of over 863,000 units, it was certified Gold by the RIAA. The Senior produced three singles, including lead single "Hell Yeah" and follow-up "In Those Jeans," which peaked at number 17 and number eight on the Billboard Hot 100, respectively.

In November 2005, Epic released the singer's fifth studio album Back II da Basics. It debuted at number twelve on the Billboard 200 and number three Top R&B/Hip-Hop Albums, with total sales reaching 176,000 copies in the United States. With singles such as "When We Make Love" failing to impact on the charts, the album ultimately resulted in the termination of his contract with Epic. After his departure from the label, Ginuwine signed with Notifi and Asylum Records and released his next album A Man's Thoughts in 2009. It opened at number nine on the Billboard 200 and scored him his second number one album on the Top R&B/Hip-Hop Albums. Lead single "Last Chance" became a top three hit on the US Hot R&B/Hip-Hop Songs chart. Later albums did not achieve the same commercial success, though 2011's Elgin, his second project with Notifi, debuted at number seven on the Top R&B/Hip-Hop Albums. Ginuwine's Christmas solo album, A Ginuwine Christmas, released in October 2011, failed to chart.

== Albums ==
=== Studio albums ===
List of studio albums, with selected chart positions, sales figures and certifications
Title	Album details	Peak chart positions								Sales	Certifications
Title	Album details	US	US R&B	AUS	FRA	GER	NLD	NZ	UK	Sales	Certifications
Ginuwine... the Bachelor	Released: October 8, 1996; Label: 550 Music, Epic; Formats: cassette, CD	26	14	75	—	54	80	50	74	US: 2,000,000	RIAA: 2× Platinum; BPI: Silver; MC: Gold
100% Ginuwine	Released: March 16, 1999; Label: 550 Music, Epic; Format: CD, digital download	5	2	—	—	40	23	—	42	US: 2,000,000	RIAA: 2× Platinum
The Life	Released: April 3, 2001; Label: Epic; Format: CD, digital download	3	2	—	—	—	—	—	— (Note: "The Life" did not enter the UK Albums Chart Top 100, but peaked at number 17 on the UK Hip Hop and R&B Albums Chart.)	US: 1,380,000	RIAA: Platinum
The Senior	Released: April 8, 2003; Label: Epic; Format: CD, digital download	6	1	—	138	—	—	99	— (Note: "The Senior" did not enter the UK Albums Chart Top 100, but peaked at number 15 on the UK Hip Hop and R&B Albums Chart.)	US: 862,000	RIAA: Gold
Back II da Basics	Released: November 15, 2005; Label: Epic; Format: CD, digital download	12	3	—	—	—	—	—	— (Note: "Back II da Basics" did not enter the UK Albums Chart, but peaked at number 26 on the UK Hip Hop and R&B Albums Chart.)	US: 176,000	
A Man's Thoughts	Released: June 23, 2009; Label: Notifi/Asylum/Warner Bros.; Format: CD, digital download	9	1	—	—	—	—	—	—		
Elgin	Released: February 15, 2011; Label: Notifi, Fontana; Format: CD, digital download	30	7	—	—	—	—	—	—		
"—" denotes a recording that did not chart or was not released in that territory.

=== Christmas albums ===
List of albums, with selected chart positions
Title	Album details	Peak chart positions		
Title	Album details	US	US R&B	UK
A Ginuwine Christmas	Released: October 11, 2011; Label: Notifi, Fontana; Formats: CD, digital download	—	—	—

=== Collaboration albums ===
List of albums, with selected chart positions
Title	Album details	Peak chart positions		
Title	Album details	US	US R&B	UK
Three Kings (with TGT)	Released: August 20, 2013; Label: Atlantic; Formats: CD, digital download	3	1	95

=== Compilation albums ===
List of compilation albums, with selected chart positions
Title	Album details	Peak chart positions
Title	Album details	US R&B
Greatest Hits	Released: November 21, 2006; Label: 550 Music, Epic; Formats: Digital download, CD	42
I Apologize	Released: February 13, 2007; Label: Siccness, Koch; Formats: Digital download, CD	50
Playlist: The Very Best of Ginuwine	Released: April 29, 2008; Label: SonyBMG; Formats: Digital download, CD	—
S.O.U.L.	Released: 2011; Label: Sony Music; Formats: Digital download, CD	—
"—" denotes a recording that did not chart or was not released in that territory.

== Singles ==
=== As lead artist ===
List of singles, with selected chart positions and certifications, showing year released and album name
Title	Year	Peak chart positions								Certifications	Album
Title	Year	US	US R&B	AUS	GER	NLD	NZ	SWI	UK	Certifications	Album
"Pony"	1996	6	1	3	22	8	5	29	16	RIAA: Platinum; ARIA: Platinum; BPI: 2× Platinum; RMNZ: 4× Platinum	Ginuwine... the Bachelor
"Tell Me Do U Wanna"	1997	— (Note: "Tell Me Do U Wanna" did not enter the US Billboard Hot 100, but peaked at number 55 on the US Billboard Radio Songs.)	— (Note: "Tell Me Do U Wanna" did not enter the US Billboard R&B chart, but peaked at number 14 on the US Billboard R&B Hip Hop Airplay chart.)	100	—	—	21	—	16		Ginuwine... the Bachelor
"When Doves Cry"	1997	—	—	—	15	13	7	24	10		Ginuwine... the Bachelor
"I'll Do Anything/I'm Sorry"	1997	—	—	—	—	—	—	—	—		Ginuwine... the Bachelor
"Only When Ur Lonely"	1997	—	—	—	—	—	—	—	—		Ginuwine... the Bachelor
"Holler" (featuring Nikki and Virginia Slim)	1997	—	—	—	—	—	—	—	13		Ginuwine... the Bachelor
"Same Ol' G"	1998	— (Note: "Same Ol' G" did not enter the US Billboard Hot 100, but peaked at number 67 on the US Billboard Radio Songs.)	— (Note: "Same Ol' G" did not enter the US R&B chart, but peaked at number 11 on the US R&B Hip Hop Airplay chart.)	—	—	9	—	—	—		Dr. Dolittle OST soundtrack and 100% Ginuwine
"What's So Different?"	1999	49	21	—	50	—	16	43	10		100% Ginuwine
"So Anxious"	1999	16	2	—	—	—	—	—	—	RMNZ: Gold	100% Ginuwine
"None of Ur Friends Business"	1999	48	7	—	—	—	—	—	—		100% Ginuwine
"The Best Man I Can Be" (with Case, Tyrese, & R.L.)	1999	77	20	—	—	—	—	—	—		The Best Man OST
"There It Is"	2001	66	18	—	—	—	—	—	—		The Life
"Differences"	2001	4	1	—	—	—	—	—	—	RIAA: Gold; BPI: Silver; RMNZ: Platinum	The Life
"Just Because"	2001	—	—	—	74	43	—	—	—		The Life
"Tribute to a Woman"	2002	—	61	—	—	—	—	—	—		The Life
"Stingy"	2002	33	7	—	—	—	—	—	—		Barbershop OST & The Senior
"Hell Yeah" (featuring Baby)	2003	17	16	—	—	38	—	—	27		The Senior
"In Those Jeans"	2003	8	3	—	—	—	—	—	—	RIAA: Gold; RMNZ: Platinum	The Senior
"Love You More"	2003	78	28	—	—	—	—	—	—		The Senior
"When We Make Love"	2005	—	51	—	—	—	—	—	—		Back II Da Basics
"I'm in Love"	2006	—	69	—	—	—	—	—	—		Back II Da Basics
"Last Chance"	2009	63	3	—	—	—	—	—	—		A Man's Thoughts
"Trouble" (featuring Bun B)	2010	—	65	—	—	—	—	—	—		A Man's Thoughts
"Get Involved" (featuring Missy Elliott & Timbaland)	2010	— (Note: "Get Involved" did not enter the US Billboard Hot 100, but peaked at number 70 on the US Billboard Pop 100 Airplay)	—	—	35	—	—	—	—		A Man's Thoughts
"What Could Have Been"	2010	—	61	—	—	—	—	—	—		Elgin
"Heaven"	2011	—	—	—	—	—	—	—	—		Elgin
"Toxic Pony" (with Altégo & Britney Spears)	2022	— (Note: "Toxic Pony" did not enter the US Billboard Hot 100, but peaked at number 40 on the US Billboard Pop Airplay chart.)	—	—	—	—	—	—	—	RMNZ: Gold	Non-album single
"—" denotes a recording that did not chart or was not released in that territory.

=== As featured artist ===
List of singles, with selected chart positions and certifications, showing year released and album name
Title	Year	Peak chart positions			Certifications	Album
Title	Year	US	US R&B	UK	Certifications	Album
"You Owe Me" (Nas featuring Ginuwine)	2000	59	13	—		Nastradamus
"It Wasn't Me" (Sole featuring Ginuwine or J-Weav)	2000	—	44	—		Skin Deep
"Take Away" (Missy Elliott featuring Ginuwine & introducing Tweet)	2001	45	13	—		Miss E... So Addictive
"I Need a Girl (Part Two)" (P. Diddy featuring Ginuwine, Loon & Mario Winans)	2002	4	2	4	BPI: Silver; RMNZ: Platinum	We Invented the Remix Vol. 1
"Crush Tonight" (Fat Joe featuring Ginuwine)	2002	77	29	42		Loyalty
"Pressure" (Belly featuring Ginuwine)	2007	—	—	—		The Revolution
"Pony (Jump on It)" (Tough Love featuring Ginuwine)	2015	—	—	39	BPI: Silver	Past Present Future
"I Need You" (Q. Parker featuring Various Artists)	2020	—	—	—		The Bridge Project
"—" denotes a recording that did not chart or was not released in that territory.

== Other guest appearances ==
Title	Year	Other artist(s)	Album
"Friendly Skies"	1997	Missy Elliott	Supa Dupa Fly
"Is This the End?"	1997	Puff Daddy & The Family, Twista, Carl Thomas	No Way Out
"Joy"	1997	Timbaland & Magoo, Playa	Welcome to Our World
"I'm Feelin' You"	1997	—N/a	Men in Black: The Album
"Keep It Real"	1998	Timbaland	Tim's Bio: Life from da Bassment
"How Would You Like It"	2000	Funkmaster Flex	The Mix Tape, Vol. IV
"Simply Irresistible"	2000	—N/a	Romeo Must Die
"Can You Tell It's Me"	2001	—N/a	Down to Earth
"Ooh Wee"	2006	LL Cool J	Todd Smith
"Let's Ride"	2006	Method Man	4:21... The Day After
"It's Real"	2009	Mýa	Mya and Friends Presents... Best of Both Worlds

== Music videos ==
List of music videos
Title	Year	Director(s)
"Pony"	1996	Michael Lucero
"Pony (Ride It Mix)"	1996	Christopher Erskin
"Tell Me Do U Wanna"	1997	Michael Lucero
"I'll Do Anything/I'm Sorry"	1997	Bille Woodruff
"When Doves Cry"	1997	Michael Lucero
"Only When Ur Lonely"	1997	Darren Grant
"Holler"	1997	Darren Grant
"Same Ol' G"	1998	Dave Meyers
What's So Different?"	1999	Francis Lawrence
"So Anxious"	1999	Chris Robinson
None of Ur Friends Business"	1999	Chris Robinson
"It Wasn't Me"	2000	Steve Feliciano, Jaysen Inglesias
There It Is	2001	Little X
"Differences"	2001	Hype Williams
"Just Because"	2001	Francis Lawrence
"Hell Yeah"	2003	Dave Meyers
"In Those Jeans"	2003	Chris Robinson
"When We Make Love"	2005	Philip Andelman
"I'm In Love"	2006	Lance Rivera
"Last Chance"	2009	Juwan Lee
"Trouble"	2009	Unknown
"Touch Me"	2009	Rik Cordero
"Get Involved"	2010	Claudio Zagarini, Marco Pavone
"What Could Have Been"	2010	Clifton Bell
"Heaven"	2011	Unknown
"Batteries"	2011	Unknown
"Break"	2011	Unknown
"Drink of Choice"	2011	Willc, Tana
"Sex Never Felt Better"	2013	Matt Alonzo
"I Need"	2013	Benny Boom
"Pony (Jump on It)" (with Tough Love)	2015	Rock Jacobs
