= Greatest Hits (Ginuwine album) =

Greatest hits album by Ginuwine
- Released: November 21, 2006
- Length: 58:41 (US); 71:59 (Int'l)
- Label: Epic
- Producer: Bryan Michael Cox; Richie Jones; Greg Lawson; Jimmy Jam and Terry Lewis; Cliff Jones; R. Kelly; Troy Oliver; Cedric Solomon; Timbaland; Jerry "Juke" Vines; Ric Wake; Jim Wright

Ginuwine chronology
Back II Da Basics (2005)	Greatest Hits (2006)	A Man's Thoughts (2009)

Greatest Hits is a compilation album by American singer Ginuwine. It was first released by Epic Records on November 21, 2006 in the United States. Completing his contract with the label, the album comprises some of the artist's more popular tracks such as "Pony", "Differences", and "So Anxious", as well as tracks produced by Timbaland and R. Kelly. Greatest Hits was debuted and peaked at number 42 on the US Top R&B/Hip-Hop Albums.

== Critical reception ==
Professional ratings
Review scores
Source	Rating
AllMusic	4.5/5 stars

AllMusic editor Andy Kellman found that the album "remains true to its title. The spread from Ginuwine's first five albums, released from 1996 through 2005, is fairly balanced. While another three or four songs could've been added to the program, it'll satisfy anyone with a moderate interest in one of the more successful male R&B vocalists of the late '90s and early 2000s – one who handled the club tracks ("Pony," "Hell Yeah"), ballads ("So Anxious," "Differences," "Stingy"), and midtempo material ("What's So Different") equally well."

== Track listing ==
US edition
No.	Title	Writer(s)	Producer(s)	Length
1.	"What's So Different?"	Thomas Boyce; Bobby Hart; Elgin Lumpkin; Timothy Mosley	Timbaland	3:57
2.	"Hell Yeah" (Single Mix featuring Baby)	R. Kelly; Bryan Williams	Kelly; Ginuwine^{[a]}	3:40
3.	"Pony" (Extended Mix)	Stephen Garrett; Lumpkin; Mosley	Timbaland	5:21
4.	"In Those Jeans"	Lumpkin; Harvey "The Rook" Hester	Jerry "Juke" Vines; Ginuwine^{[b]}; Hester^{[b]}	4:04
5.	"So Anxious"	Benjamin Bush; Garrett; Mosley	Timbaland	4:37
6.	"Differences"	Lumpkin; Troy Oliver	Oliver	4:26
7.	"There It Is"	Harold Garvin; Cliff Jones; Lumpkin; Bobby Terry; Vines; Curtis Williams	Jones; Vines	4:11
8.	"None of Ur Friends Business"	Lumpkin; Mosley	Timbaland	4:16
9.	"I'm in Love"	Lumpkin; Oliver	Oliver	4:06
10.	"Stingy"	Bryan Michael Cox; Jason Perry; Johnta Austin	Cox; Perry^{[b]}	4:20
11.	"You Owe Me" (Nas featuring Ginuwine)	Nasir Jones; Garrett; Mosley	Timbaland	4:48
12.	"Same Ol' G"	Jimmy Douglass; Steven Garrett; Mosley	Timbaland	4:21
13.	"The Best Man I Can Be" (with RL, Tyrese & Case)	James Harris III; Terry Lewis; Big Jim Wright	Jimmy Jam and Terry Lewis; Wright	6:29

International edition
No.	Title	Writer(s)	Producer(s)	Length
1.	"Holler"	Lumpkin; Mosley	Timbaland	5:04
2.	"When Doves Cry"	Prince	Timbaland	4:34
3.	"You Owe Me" (Nas featuring Ginuwine)	Jones; Garrett; Mosley	Timbaland	4:48
4.	"Hell Yeah" (featuring Baby)	Kelly; Williams	Kelly; Ginuwine^{[a]}	3:438
5.	"Pony" (Extended Mix)	Garrett; Lumpkin; Mosley	Timbaland	5:20
6.	"In Those Jeans"	Lumpkin; Hester	Vines; Ginuwine^{[b]}; Hester^{[b]}	4:03
7.	"So Anxious"	Benjamin Bush; Garrett; Mosley	Timbaland	4:37
8.	"Differences"	Lumpkin; Oliver	Oliver	4:25
9.	"I'm in Love"	Lumpkin; Oliver	Oliver	4:05
10.	"Stingy"	Cox; Perry; Austin	Cox; Perry^{[b]}	4:20
11.	"What's So Different?"	Boyce; Hart; Lumpkin; Mosley	Timbaland	3:55
12.	"The Best Man I Can Be" (with RL, Tyrese & Case)	Harris; Lewis; Wright	Jam; Lewis; Wright	6:29
13.	"Same Ol' G"	Douglass; Garrett; Mosley	Timbaland	4:21
14.	"Just Because" (Bryan-Michael Cox Remix)	Greg Lawson; Lumpkin; David Sharpe	Ric Wake; Lawson; Richie Jones; Cox^{[a]}	3:53
15.	"When We Make Love"	Lumpkin; Cedric Solomon	Solomon	3:55
16.	"Tell Me Do U Wanna" (Single Mix)	Douglass; Lumpkin; Mosley; Robert Reives	Timbaland	4:18

Notes

- ^{^[a]} denotes additional producer
- ^{^[b]} denotes co-producer

Sample credits

- "What's So Different?" contains a sample from "Valleri" as recorded by The Monkees

== Charts ==
Chart (2006)	Peak position
US Top R&B/Hip-Hop Albums (Billboard)	42

== Release history ==
Region	Date	Format(s)	Label	Ref.
United States	November 21, 2006	CD; digital download	Epic	
United Kingdom	March 19, 2007	CD; digital download	Columbia; Sony BMG	
