= A Man's Thoughts =

Studio album by Ginuwine
- Released: June 23, 2009
- Length: 53:21
- Labels: Notifi; Asylum; Warner Bros.
- Producers: Ted Clinkscale; Melvin Coleman; Bryan-Michael Cox; Blac Elvis; J-Roc; Dante Jackson; Bei Maejor; Michael Naylor; Pop & Oak; Melvin Rogers; Timbaland

Ginuwine chronology
Greatest Hits (2006)	A Man's Thoughts (2009)	Elgin (2011)

Singles from A Man's Thoughts
- 1. "Last Chance" Released: March 31, 2009; 2. "Trouble" Released: January 18, 2010; 3. "Get Involved" Released: January 29, 2010

A Man's Thoughts is the sixth studio album from American R&B singer Ginuwine. It was released by Notifi in partnership with Asylum Records on June 23, 2009 in the United States, with distribution handled by Warner Bros. The singer co-wrote just under fifty songs for the album and worked a variety of producers on new material, including Bryan-Michael Cox, Blac Elvis, Bei Maejor, and Pop & Oak. He also reunited with early career collaborators Timbaland and Missy Elliott on the song "Get Involved."

Critics offered varied assessments of A Man's Thoughts, with some praising its mature tone and emotional depth, while others criticized its lack of standout material and overreliance on slow, formulaic ballads. The album opened at number nine on the US Billboard 200, selling 38,000 units in its first week, and scored Ginuwine's his second number one on the Top R&B/Hip-Hop Albums chart after The Senior in 2003. Lead single "Last Chance" became a top three hit on the US Hot R&B/Hip-Hop Songs chart.

== Background ==
In November 2005, Ginuwine released Back II da Basics, his fifth studio album on Epic Records. The project opened and peaked at number twelve on the US Billboard 200, selling less than 200,000 copies domestically. With singles such as "When We Make Love" failing to impact on the charts, the album ultimately resulted in the termination of his contract with Epic Records, with the label releasing his first compilation album, Greatest Hits, the following year. In May 2007, Koch Records issued a compilation titled I Apologize under Ginuwine's name. Although it peaked at number 50 on the US Top R&B/Hip-Hop Albums chart, the singer later clarified that the release was neither independent nor approved by him and consisted solely of previously recorded material along with other artist's songs.

For his next album, Ginuwine signed with Notifi Records, with distribution through Warner Bros. Records. Although Billboard reported that singer-producer Tank would serve as the album's executive producer, he was later replaced by Kedar Massenberg during the production process. Ginuwine wrote a total of 45 songs for the album, but only chose 14 to be included on the album. R.L. Huggar and Harold Lilly, Jr. were among the musicians that he consulted to work with him on material for the album. He also reunited with early career collaborators Timbaland and Missy Elliott on the song "Get Involved" and worked with Teddy Riley. Additional sessions with Polow da Don failed to materialize. Commenting on the album, he told Billboard in June 2009: "I'm still Ginuwnine, but my new album reflects my creative maturity."

== Promotion ==
"Last Chance," produced by Bryan-Michael Cox and written by Adonis Shropshire, was released by Notifi on March 3, 2009 as the album's lead single. A song about a man's plea for one last chance to prove his love, it peaked at number 63 on the US Billboard Hot 100 and number three on the Hot R&B/Hip-Hop Songs chart, becoming Ginuwine's highest-charting single since "In Those Jeans" (2003). "Trouble" featuring Bun B was released as the album's second US single but was significantly less successful commercially, reaching number 65 on the Hot R&B/Hip-Hop Songs chart only. Elsewhere, "Get Involved" served as the album's second single. It reached the top 40 on the German Singles Chart, becoming his highest-charting single since "When Doves Cry" (1997).

== Critical reception ==
Professional ratings
Aggregate scores
Source	Rating
Metacritic	53/100
Review scores
Source	Rating
About.com	3/5 stars
AllMusic	3/5 stars
Boston Herald	B−
Chicago Tribune	2/4 stars
Robert Christgau	C
Entertainment Weekly	C
Los Angeles Times	2/4 stars
Metro News	3/5 stars
PopMatters	5/10
USA Today	3/4 stars

A Man's Thoughts was met with "mixed or average" reviews from critics. At Metacritic, which assigns a weighted average rating out of 100 to reviews from mainstream publications, this release received an average score of 53 based on 10 reviews. In a review for AllMusic, critic reviewer Andy Kellman called he album "a decent set of modern R&B, dominated by seductive slow jams, that stimulates a little more often than it fades into the background. It does take a serious tone on a handful of songs dealing in a wider range of relationship issues than lust, heartache, and devotion." Similarly, Steve Jones from USA Today found that "Ginuwine has always been a smooth purveyor of steamy slow jams, but here the sex involves more emotional entanglement, and that can lead to complications [...] The simmering tempo is interrupted only by the percolating "Get Involved," which reunites him with early mentors Timbaland and Missy Elliott. It's like a sunny commercial break in the middle, before regular programming resumes."

The Boston Herald's Lauren Carter called A Man's Thoughts "a sultry collection of body-worshiping, bedroom-centric tales [...] But this is not the same ol’ G. Though he reunites with former cohorts Timbaland and Missy Elliott [...] Ginuwine has traded in the synth burps and stuttering percussion for a mature sound that mixes contemporary with quiet storm. Yes, his vocals still burn, but the total package has lost some sizzle." Mikael Wood from The Los Angeles Times argued that "the vocals are fine. In fact, their relatively rough-hewn humanity is kind of refreshing in the Age of Auto-Tune. But with only a few exceptions [...] the material here doesn't live up to his performances, making the music easier to admire than to enjoy." Entertainment Weekly's Simon Vozick-Levinson remarked that "a handful of uptempo highlights aside, the rest of the disc turns out to be an unduly generous helping of syrupy bedroom pleas that'll have you wishing Ginuwine had decided to keep some of those Thoughts to himself." Tyler Lewis from PopMatters found that A Man's Thoughts "continues the uneven work" Ginuwine's had been doing since 2001. He critiqued the singer for replacing himself "with the latest trendy producers" and noted that "as a result, very few songs on the album stand out."

== Commercial performance ==
Originally set to be released on June 2, A Man's Thoughts was pushed back to June 23, 2009. Upon its release, it debuted and peaked at number nine on the US Billboard 200, selling 38,000 units in its first week. The album marked his fourth non-consecutive top the album on the chart. It also scored Ginuwine's his second number one on the Top R&B/Hip-Hop Albums chart after The Senior in 2003. Billboard ranked it 57th on its 2009 Top R&B/Hip-Hop Albums year-end chart.

== Track listing ==
A Man's Thoughts track listing
No.	Title	Writer(s)	Producer(s)	Length
1.	"Intro (A Man's Thoughts)"	Michael Naylor; Elgin Baylor Lumpkin	Naylor	1:10
2.	"Show Off"	R.L. Huggar; Allen Potridge; Warren Felder	Pop & Oak	3:21
3.	"Trouble" (featuring Bun B)	R. Vincent; Lumpkin; B. Freeman; T. White	Dante Jackson	4:01
4.	"Last Chance"	Adonis Shropshire; Bryan-Michael Cox; W. Wells	Cox	4:29
5.	"Interlude"	Naylor; Lumpkin	Naylor	1:15
6.	"One Time for Love"	Shropshire; Cox; Johnta Austin; Kendrick Dean	Cox	4:38
7.	"Open the Door"	Huggar; Potridge; Felder	Pop & Oak	3:45
8.	"Get Involved" (featuring Missy Elliott & Timbaland)	Lumpkin; Melissa Elliott; Patrick "J. Que" Smith; Ezekiel Lewis; Timothy Mosley; Jerome Harmon	Timbaland; J-Roc^{[a]}	3:38
9.	"Orchestra"	Lumpkin; Huggar; Potridge; Felder	Pop & Oak	3:31
10.	"Touch Me"	Huggar; Potridge; Melvin "Saint Nick" Coleman; Jayshawn Champion	Coleman	4:13
11.	"Lying to Each Other"	Elvis Williams; Harold Lilly, Jr.	Blac Elvis	3:41
12.	"Even When I'm Mad"	A. Wright; Huggar; Coleman; James Rayshawn Smith	Coleman	3:33
13.	"Bridge to Love" (featuring Brandy)	Shropshire; Williams	Blac Elvis	4:00
14.	"Used to Be the One"	Lumpkin; Naylor; Melvin Rogers; Ted Clinkscale; Oli Jean Joseph; Ricky Rush	Naylor; Rogers; Clinkscale	4:29
15.	"Show Me the Way"	Lumpkin; Naylor; Joseph; Brandon Green	Bei Maejor	3:32
Total length:				53:21

Notes

- ^{^[a]} denotes a co-producer

== Charts ==
=== Weekly charts ===
Weekly chart performance for A Man's Thoughts
Chart (2009)	Peak position
US Billboard 200	9
US Top R&B/Hip-Hop Albums (Billboard)	1

=== Year-end charts ===
Year-end chart performance for A Man's Thoughts
Chart (2009)	Position
US Top R&B/Hip-Hop Albums (Billboard)	57

== Release history ==
Release history for A Man's Thoughts
Region	Date	Format(s)	Label	Ref.
Various	June 23, 2009	CD; digital download	Notifi; Asylum; Warner Bros.	
