= Stingy =

Stingy may refer to one of the following:

- A miser
- The name of a fictional puppet character on LazyTown
- Stingy (song), single by Ginuwine
