= When We Make Love =

When We Make Love may refer to:

- "When We Make Love" (Alabama song)
- "When We Make Love" (Ginuwine song)
