= Tribute to a Woman =

Single by Ginuwine

from the album The Life
- Released: May 7, 2002
- Length: 4:59
- Label: Epic
- Songwriters: Elgin Lumpkin; Troy Oliver
- Producers: Cory Rooney; Troy Oliver

Ginuwine singles chronology
| "Take Away" (2001) | "Tribute to a Woman" (2002) | "I Need a Girl (Part Two)" (2002) |

"Tribute to a Woman" is a song by American R&B singer Ginuwine. It was co-written and produced by Troy Oliver along with Cory Rooney for his studio third album The Life (2001). The song was released as the album's fourth and final single and reached number 61 on the US Hot R&B/Hip-Hop Songs chart.

== Background ==
"Tribute to a Woman" was written by Ginuwine and Troy Oliver, while production was helmed by Oliver along with Cory Rooney. In a 2016 interview, Ginuwine commented on the song: "I love that song. Everybody tells me about that song, especially the women. I just felt women needed a song like that. It was sort of like "Dear Mama" by 2Pac. When I made that one, I was really trying to get all of the power women like Oprah. It didn’t work out, but the thought was there because I was thinking about it."

== Track listing ==
12" single
| No. | Title | Writer(s) | Producer(s) | Length |
|---|---|---|---|---|
| 1. | "Tribute to a Woman" | Elgin Lumpkin; Troy Oliver | Oliver | 4:59 |
| 2. | "That's How I Get Down" (featuring Ludacris) | Christopher Bridges; Lumpkin; Timothy Mosley | Timbaland | 4:13 |

== Credits and personnel ==
Credits lifted from the liner notes of The Life.

- Ginuwine – executive producer, vocals, writer
- Troy Oliver – producer, writer
- Cory Rooney – producer
- Vlad the Impaler – mastering

== Charts ==
| Chart (2002) | Peak position |
|---|---|
| US Hot R&B/Hip-Hop Songs (Billboard) | 61 |
