= I Apologize (album) =

Compilation album by Ginuwine
- Released: February 13, 2007
- Genre: Contemporary R&B
- Length: 40:19
- Labels: Siccness; Koch

Ginuwine chronology
Greatest Hits (2006)	I Apologize (2007)	A Man's Thoughts (2009)

I Apologize, while credited to Ginuwine, is not an official release but has acceptance to his catalog. It peaked at No. 50 on the Billboard Top R&B/Hip-Hop Albums chart.

According to the San Diego Union Tribune an article written by music critic George Varga, Music Manager Leon Derrick Youngblood SR was quoted as saying, "the album was suppose [sic] to be a Ginuwine Presents Album, it did very well on such a low budget the album reached number 50 on the billboard charts". Youngblood and his wife Ginger both managed the recording artist, who hit number 50 on the charts. The album 'I Apologize' was released in Feb 13, 2007.

== Background ==
Leon Derrick Youngblood Sr, who is also the father of 14-time Grammy nominated producer Leon Derrick Youngblood "ROCCSTAR" connected the main singer Tommy Redding with Matt Wargurt, head of A&R with Columbia Records. Leon Derrick Youngblood SR, was able to secure a three-page newspaper article for this project. With Pop Music Critic George Varga head music writer with the San Diego Union.

== Sales ==
After its release on February 13, 2007, the album I Apologize was distributed to the stores for sale but soon after that there was a dispute regarding the copyright of the eight track (AllMusic). Apparently the CD had only three songs attributed to Ginuwine and the rest were by other undisclosed artists. It was therefore not an official release and official sales have not been concluded as this was an unauthorized album (AllMusic).

== Track listing ==
1. "Intro" – 1:06
2. "I Apologize" (Melvin "Melrog" Rogers, Ted Clinkscale, Elgin Lumpkin) – 4:20
3. "Since I Found U" (featuring Tommy Redding) (P. Deleon, M. Edwards, V. Ichihara) – 3:01
4. "Better Days" (featuring Tommy Redding) (Tommy Redding) – 4:25
5. "Happy at Home" (featuring I-Rocc) (R. Eddington, S. Groves, B. Houston, I. Woods) – 3:19
6. "Say When" (featuring Tommy Redding) (T. Redding) – 5:09
7. "It's Real" (featuring Racheul Evans) (Clinkscale, Edwards, R. Evans, Groves, Lumpkin, Rogers, J. Williams) – 4:14
8. "What's It Gunna Be" (featuring Tommy Redding) (Eddington, Groves, Redding) – 3:26
9. "Like Me" (featuring G-Dep and Loon) (Eddington, Groves, Chauncey Hawkins, B. Houston) – 4:04
10. "Twerk" (featuring Tommy Redding) (Clinkscale, Redding, Rogers) – 3:30
11. "I Apologize" (remix) (featuring Smigg Dirtee, B-Way) (Clinkscale, Lumpkin, Rogers) – 3:20
12. "Outro" – 0:25

== Personnel ==
- Mike Eddy- Primary Artist (Track 3, "Since I found u)
- Rachel Evans- Primary artist
- G. Dep- Featured Artist, Primary Artist (Track 9, "Like me")
- Ginuwine- Main Personnel, Primary Artist, Vocals
- Hartman the Hit Man- Producer
- I-Rocc- Primary Artist (Track 5, "Happy at home")
- Loon- Featured artist, primary artist (Track 9, "Like me")
- Jayz- Engineer
- Reason- Vocals
- T- Redding- Engineer, producer (Track 6, "say when")
- Tommy Redding- Primary artist (tracks 4,6,8&10)
- Melvin Rogers- Audio production, producer (Tracks 1,2,7,10,11,12)
- Smigg Dirtee- Primary artist (Track 11 "I apologize (Remix)")
- Peter Wonder – Producer

== Charts and certifications ==
Leon Derrick Youngblood SR took his recording artist Tommy Redding to audition for Columbia Records immediately after the release of this album, Even though it was not an official release, and on a low budget, I apologize reached No .29 on the Top Independent Albums charts and No. 50 on the R&B Albums charts that year.
