= Get Involved (Ginuwine song) =

Single by Ginuwine featuring Timbaland and Missy Elliott

from the album A Man's Thoughts
- Released: January 29, 2010
- Recorded: 2007–2009
- Genre: Electropop; techno; hip-hop; funk; soul; R&B
- Label: Notifi; Warner Bros.
- Songwriters: Elgin Lumpkin; Melissa Elliott; Timothy Mosley; Ezekiel Lewis; Patrick Smith
- Producers: Timbaland; J-Roc

Ginuwine singles chronology
"Trouble" (2010)	"Get Involved" (2010)	"What Could Have Been" (2010)

Timbaland singles chronology
"Carry Out" (2009)	"Get Involved" (2010)	"If We Ever Meet Again" (2010)

Missy Elliott singles chronology
"Fakin' It" (2009)	"Get Involved" (2010)	"Last Friday Night (T.G.I.F.)" (remix) (2011)

"Get Involved" is a song by American singer Ginuwine from his sixth studio album A Man's Thoughts (2009). The song was co-written by Missy Elliott and produced by Timbaland and featured guest vocals from the pair. Although the song was originally scheduled to be released in summer 2009 as the second single from the album, it was pushed back to 2010 as an international single from the album because of a dispute between Ginuwine and Timbaland.

== Background ==
In 2007, when asked about who he would like to work with that would surprise people, Timbaland told Billboard, "For personal reasons I'd like to work with Ginuwine." In November 2008, Ginuwine confirmed to the press that Timbaland would be featured on A Man's Thoughts.

== Release and promotion ==
The song was first performed on 23 July 2009 on The Late Show with David Letterman. Ginuwine and Missy were the only performers from the song to appear; Timbaland was exempted. The song was officially released overseas as early as 29 January 2010. On 29 June 2010, a promotional CD release for the single was given a limited released in the United States. In 2011, a twelve-track E–single of the song was released in Spain. On 12 March 2012, the record label Smash The House released a digital three-track remix sampler exclusively via the online store Amazon.

== Controversy ==
An initial dispute between Timbaland and Ginuwine dates back to October 2009, when Timbaland expressed disinterest in appearing in the "Get Involved" music video. In April 2010, Ginuwine told Vibe: "He really hasn’t been interested in working with me, so I can’t speak on the present [...] The reason I'm pissed off at him now is because of what he did. I would've been cool and not bothered him if he would've said, 'Nah, I'm too busy,' or gave me the lame excuse like he's been giving me. But don't do it and then not do what you're supposed to do [to promote the song]." Ginuwine later disclosed to the Atlanta radio station WAMJ that a settlement of over $50,000 was made for Timbaland to appear in the video. However, because of Timbaland's persistent disinterest, the single was shelved in the United States and was instead released overseas with an animated music video. In July 2011, Timbaland responded to Ginuwine's comments via BET.com, "I know how he might feel. He might think that we abandoned him [...] We never would abandon him. He’s like a brother. But when you get everybody else, mix different managers... it changes every dynamic." Timbaland also added that he wanted to work with Ginuwine for the sake of their friendship and brotherhood. That same month, Ginuwine told MTV UK that he and Timbaland were cool and that they would converse at times via Twitter. He also added that a song with him, Missy and Timbaland would "hopefully" develop to show the "magic" they once had.

== Formats and track listings ==
Australian iTunes single

1. "Get Involved" (feat. Timbaland & Missy Elliott) — 3:37
2. "Get Involved" (A Class Edit) — 3:00
3. "Get Involved" (Marcus Knight Down South Remix) — 4:11
4. "Get Involved" (N3sh & d'Aambrogio Remix) — 7:56
5. "Get Involved" (Joe T Vanelii Remix) — 8:26
6. "Get Involved" (Bernasconi & Farenthide Remix) — 5:16
7. "Get Involved" (Rico Bernasconi Remix) — 5:34
8. "Get Involved" (Jake & Cooper Mix) — 6:30

European CD single

1. "Get Involved" (A Class Edit) — 3:00
2. "Get Involved" — 3:38

Finnish Promo CDS

1. "Get Involved" (Original Edit) — 3:41
2. "Get Involved" (A Class Video Edit) — 3:45
3. "Get Involved" (A Class Edit Mix) — 3:03
4. "Get Involved" (A Class Floor Mix) — 4:00
5. "Get Involved" (Bernasconi & Farenthide Remix) — 5:19
6. "Get Involved" (Rico Bernasconi Remix) — 5:36
7. "Get Involved" (Joe T Vannelli Remix) — 8:28
8. "Get Involved" (N3sh & D'Ambrogio Remix) — 7:58
9. "Get Involved" (Jake & Cooper Mix) — 6:31

Italian 12" vinyl

1. "Get Involved" (Joe T Vannelli Remix) — 8:26
2. "Get Involved" (Original Version) — 3:37
3. "Get Involved" (N3sh & D'Ambrogio Remix) — 7:58
4. "Get Involved" (Jake & Cooper Mix) — 6:30

Italian CD single

1. "Get Involved" (Original Version) — 3:40
2. "Get Involved" (A-Class Video Mix) — 3:45
3. "Get Involved" (Bernasconi & Farenthide Remix) — 5:19
4. "Get Involved" (Joe T Vannelli Remix) — 8:28
5. "Get Involved" (N3sh & D'Ambrogio Remix) — 7:58
6. "Get Involved" (Jake & Cooper Mix) — 6:30

Italian digital download

1. "Get Involved" (Molella & Jerma Remix) — 6:32
2. "Get Involved" (DJs from Mars Remix) — 5:57
3. "Get Involved" (Paolo Aliberti & Francesco Andreoli) — 6:17
4. "Get Involved" (Shorty Simosun Remix) — 7:12
5. "Get Involved" (Mark & Shark Remix) — 4:39
6. "Get Involved" (Da Brozz Remix) — 4:36
7. "Get Involved" (Andres Diamond Remix) — 5:37
8. "Get Involved" (Remakeit Remix) — 4:30

Spanish E–single

1. "Get Involved" (Kylian Mash Edit Re-Mix) — 3:14
2. "Get Involved" — 3:38
3. "Get Involved" (A Class Floor Mix) — 3:43
4. "Get Involved" (A Class Video Mix) — 3:58
5. "Get Involved" (Bernasconi & Farenthide Remix) — 5:16
6. "Get Involved" (A Class Edit) — 3:00
7. "Get Involved" (Dino Lenny & Taz Remix) — 6:13
8. "Get Involved" (Jake & Cooper Mix) — 6:30
9. "Get Involved" (Joe T Vanelii Remix) — 8:26
10. "Get Involved" (Kylian Mash Extended Re-Mix) — 5:03
11. "Get Involved" (N3sh & d'Aambrogio Remix) — 7:56
12. "Get Involved" (Rico Bernasconi Remix) — 5:34

UK Promo CDS

1. "Get Involved" (Adam F & Herve's Stadium Kaos Vocal Remix)
2. "Get Involved" (Adam F & Herve's Stadium Kaos Dub)

US digital download

1. "Get Involved" (Wolfpack Remix) — 5:15
2. "Get Involved" (Yves V Remix) — 5:49
3. "Get Involved" (Firebeatz Remix) — 6:35

== Chart ==
Chart performance for "Get Involved"
Chart (2010)	Peak position
Belgium (Ultratop 50 Flanders)	48
Germany (GfK)	35
Poland (Polish Airplay New)	1
US Billboard Pop 100 Airplay	70

== Release history ==
Release dates and formats for "Get Involved"
Country	Date	Format	Ref.
Australia	10 September 2010	iTunes, digital download	
Austria	2 July 2010	CD single	
Denmark	28 July 2010	iTunes, digital download	
Finland	1 September 2010	Promo CDS	
Germany	25 June 2010	iTunes, digital download	
Germany	2 July 2010	CD single	
Italy	29 January 2010	iTunes, digital download	
Italy	18 April 2010	iTunes, digital download	
Italy	15 March 2010	12" vinyl	
Italy	15 March 2010	CD single	
New Zealand	10 September 2010	iTunes, digital download	
Norway	25 July 2011	iTunes, digital download	
Spain	24 March 2011	E–single, iTunes, digital download	
Switzerland	2 July 2010	CD single	
United Kingdom	2010	Promo CDS	
United States	29 June 2010	CD single	
United States	12 March 2012	Digital download	
