= Barbershop (soundtrack) =

BarberShop (Music From the Motion Picture)

Soundtrack album by Various artists
- Released: August 27, 2002
- Recorded: 2002
- Genres: Hip hop; R&B
- Length: 59:10
- Label: Sony Music Soundtrax
- Producers: Anita Camarata (exec.); Tim Story (exec.); Robert Teitel (exec.); George Tillman Jr. (exec.); Co-Stars; Al Bell; Bink!; Bryan-Michael Cox; Darren Lighty; DJ Clue; Duro; Eddie F; Eric "Cire" Crawford; Joseph "Jo Jo" Hearne; Sean Hall; The Characters; The Underdogs; Troy Taylor

Professional ratings
Review scores
Source	Rating
AllMusic	2.5/5 stars

BarberShop (Music From the Motion Picture) is the soundtrack to Tim Story's 2002 comedy film Barbershop. It was released on August 27, 2002 through Epic Records and consists of hip hop and R&B music. The album peaked at #29 on the Billboard 200, at #9 on the Top R&B/Hip-Hop Albums and at #1 on the Top Soundtracks. Its lead single. "Stingy" by Ginuwine, made it to #33 on the Billboard Hot 100 and #7 on the Hot R&B/Hip-Hop Singles & Tracks.

== Track listing ==
No.	Title	Producer(s)	Length
1.	"The Speech (Intro)" (performed by Cedric the Entertainer & Ice Cube)		0:40
2.	"Trade It All, Pt. 2" (performed by Fabolous, P. Diddy & Jagged Edge)	DJ Clue?; Duro	4:41
3.	"Stingy" (performed by Ginuwine)	Bryan-Michael Cox	4:23
4.	"What's Come Over Me?" (performed by Glenn Lewis & Amel Larrieux)	Troy Taylor	4:10
5.	"Love Session" (performed by Ghostface Killah & Ruff Endz)	The Underdogs	3:40
6.	"And We" (performed by P. Diddy, Black Rob, Big Azz Ko, Kain Coiffie, G. Dep, Foxy Brown, Craig Mack & The Mighty Ha)	Bink!	4:15
7.	"Could've Been You" (performed by 3LW)	Eric "Cire" Crawford	4:09
8.	"Baby Girl (Terri's Theme)" (performed by B2K)	The Characters	4:55
9.	"Sneaky" (performed by Jhené Aiko & Lil' Fizz)	Co-Stars	3:23
10.	"I See You" (performed by Best Man)	Eddie F; Darren Lighty	3:41
11.	"Better to Leave" (performed by Jordan Brown)	Co-Stars	4:11
12.	"Baby, Baby, Baby" (performed by Collin)	Sean Hall	3:52
13.	"Ben" (performed by Lil' Kano)	Joseph "Jo Jo" Hearne	3:42
14.	"Got to Give It Up, Pt. 1" (performed by Marvin Gaye)	Art Stewart	4:11
15.	"I'll Take You There" (performed by The Staple Singers)	Al Bell	4:31
16.	"Big Booty Girls (Outro)" (performed by Ice Cube, Michael Ealy, Leon Collier "Jam", Ray Thompson & Eric Lane)		0:46
Total length:			59:10

== Charts ==
Chart (2002)	Peak position
US Billboard 200	29
US Top R&B/Hip-Hop Albums (Billboard)	9
US Top Soundtracks (Billboard)	1
