= The Life (album) =

Studio album by Ginuwine
- Released: April 3, 2001
- Genre: R&B
- Length: 68:42
- Label: Epic
- Producer: Ginuwine; Loren Dawson; Cliff Jones; Richie Jones; Khris Kellow; Troy Oliver; Cory Rooney; Raphael Saadiq; Dan Shea; Jerry Vines; Ric Wake

Ginuwine chronology
100% Ginuwine (1999)	The Life (2001)	The Senior (2003)

Singles from The Life
- 1. "There It Is" Released: January 9, 2001; 2. "Differences" Released: August 8, 2001; 3. "Just Because" Released: August 17, 2001; 4. "Tribute to a Woman" Released: May 7, 2002

The Life is the third studio album from American R&B singer Ginuwine. It was released by Epic Records on April 3, 2001 in the United States. Produced by a variety of collaborators, including Khris Kellow, Troy Oliver, Cory Rooney, Raphael Saadiq, Dan Shea, and Ric Wake, the album marked a breakaway for the singer whose previous two albums Ginuwine... the Bachelor (1996) and 100% Ginuwine (1999) had been largely produced by Timbaland, who contribued one song, "That's How I Get Down," to The Life only.

The album earned generally positive reviews from music critics, some of whom felt that Timbaland was missing on the album. It debuted at number three on the US Billboard 200 with first-week sales of 152,000 copies. It was eventually certified Platinum by the Recording Industry Association of America (RAA) and surpassed sales of 1.38 million copies in September 2003. The Life produced four singles, including the Gold-certified Billboard Hot 100 top five hit single "Differences."

== Background ==
In May 1999, Ginuwine released his second album 100% Ginuwine. The album peaked at number 5 on the US Billboard 200 and reached the second spot on the R&B Albums chart, eventually reaching double Platinum in the United States. It produced four singles, including the US Billboard Hot 100 top 20 hit single "So Anxious." After 100% Ginuwine, Ginuwine and mentor Timbaland, who had produced on the majority of Ginuwine's previous alumms, grew apart. As a result, Ginuwine consulted different musicians to work with him on his next project, including Khris Kellow, Troy Oliver, Cory Rooney, Raphael Saadiq, Dan Shea, and Ric Wake. Their influence resulted in a major shift of his trademark sound. In 2016, Ginuwine further elaborated in an interview: "It was a little hard for me. Me and Tim weren't friends at that time. Me and Aaliyah weren't friends either. It was more so a separation with the business people that we were dealing with. It wasn't us, but unfortunately we were just kids at the business. We listened and we didn't really have an opinion of our own. We followed instead of leading. We ended up getting back together." The song "Two Reasons I Cry," produced by Loren Dawson, is dedicated to the memory of Ginuwine's parents, who both died a year before the album was released.

== Critical reception ==
Professional ratings
Review scores
Source	Rating
AllMusic	3.5/5 stars
Blender	3/5 stars
Entertainment Weekly	B+
NME	3.5/5 stars
Rolling Stone	3.5/5 stars
Yahoo! Music UK	5/10

The Life earned generally positive reviews, though noted that Timbaland's input was noticeably missing on the album. Entertainment Weekly's Tomika Anderson wrote that on The Life "the R&B stud drops his hardcore playa pretense to reveal a softer, more vulnerable side [...] But it’s when he balances his Romeo routine with a funky club vibe (as on "That’s How I Get Down," with Ludacris) that Life gets really good." AllMusic editor William Ruhlmann felt that the songs "mostly range from slow to very slow tempos with such trendy touches as acoustic guitar passages. But all that just serves as a bed for Ginuwine's elastic tenor and his message to the women in his audience. The singer sounds like he's been reading women's magazines and tried to construct a persona that's as appealing as possible [...] The Life looks like another winner for him."

Sam Faulkner from NME remarked that "it was always going to be impossible for Ginuwine to burst back in quite the same fashion as he suddenly first appeared riding his pony. But this set absolutely does no harm in consolidating himself as one of R&B’s brightest stars." Rolling Stone critic Arion Berger felt that "The Life is all naughty, disposable high points [...] With all the trendy touches on his third album, lady-killing crooner Ginuwine is aiming for ultramodernity – or maybe taking his eventual obsolescence for granted." People found that "on his third CD, Ginuwine remains in excellent voice, but there's something missing – and its name is Timbaland [...] There are flashes of the old sass and sexiness [but] in an apparent attempt to win an even wider audience, some of The Life has gone out of his act." Joe Gross from Blender noted: "Branching out on his third album, Ginuwine pitches down-to-earth woo on The Life."

== Chart performance ==
In the United States, The Life debuted at number three on the Billboard 200 with first-week sales of 152,000 copies. It also debuted and peaked at number two on the US Top R&B/Hip-Hop Albums. The album was certified gold by the Recording Industry Association of America (RIAA) on May 4, 2001, and eventually reached platinum on October 5, 2001. By September 2003, The Life had sold 1.38 million copies in the US.

== Track listing ==
The Life track listing
No.	Title	Writer(s)	Producer(s)	Length
1.	"Why Not Me"	Elgin Lumpkin; Troy Oliver	Oliver; Cory Rooney	6:11
2.	"There It Is"	Harold Garvin; Cliff Jones; Lumpkin; Bobby Terry; Jerry Vines; Curtis Williams	Jones; Vines	5:00
3.	"2 Way"	Lumpkin; Raphael Saadiq	Saadiq; Ginuwine	4:09
4.	"Differences"	Lumpkin; Oliver	Oliver	4:25
5.	"So Fine"	Marcus Clinkscale; Garvin; Lumpkin; Terry; Isaac Wiley; Williams	Jones; Vines	3:14
6.	"Tribute to a Woman"	Lumpkin; Oliver	Oliver; Rooney	4:59
7.	"Why Did You Go?"	Clinkscale; Garvin; Lumpkin; Terry; Wiley; Williams	Jones; Vines	6:05
8.	"How Deep Is Your Love"	Loren Dawson; Lumpkin	Dawson	4:21
9.	"That's How I Get Down" (featuring Ludacris)	Christopher Bridges; Lumpkin; Timothy Mosley	Timbaland	4:13
10.	"Show After the Show"	Clinkscale; Garvin; Lumpkin; Terry; Wiley; Williams	Jones; Vines	4:21
11.	"Role Play"	Clinkscale; Garvin; Erica Joyner; Lumpkin; Terry; Wiley; Williams	Jones; Vines	3:52
12.	"Open Arms"	Dawson; Lumpkin; Oliver; Rooney	Oliver; Rooney; Dan Shea	4:45
13.	"Superhuman"	Diane Warren	Khris Kellow	4:10
14.	"Two Reasons I Cry"	Dawson; Lumpkin	Dawson; Rooney	5:15
15.	"Just Because"	Greg Lawson; Lumpkin; David Sharpe	Ric Wake; Lawson; Richie Jones	3:42
Total length:				68:42

Japanese bonus tracks
No.	Title	Writer(s)	Producer(s)	Length
16.	"Give It Up"	Lumpkin; Williams; Vines; Clinkscale; Mechalie Jamison; Big Bob; Jones	Big Dog Productions, Inc	3:58
17.	"Fix It"	Kenneth Karlin; Marlaina Garland; Carsten Schack; Gromyko Collins	Soulshock & Karlin	4:41

Limited Edition Bonus Disc
No.	Title	Writer(s)	Producer(s)	Length
1.	"G's Got a Thing for You"	Clinkscale; Garvin; Wiley	Big Dog Productions, Inc	5:15
2.	"So Anxious (Timbaland's Anxiety Pt. 2)"	Stephen Garrett; Benjamin Bush; Timothy Mosley	Timbaland	4:20

== Charts ==
=== Weekly charts ===
Weekly chart performance for The Life
Chart (2001)	Peak position
US Billboard 200	3
US Top R&B/Hip-Hop Albums (Billboard)	2

=== Year-end charts ===
Year-end chart performance for The Life
Chart (2001)	Position
Canadian R&B Albums (Nielsen SoundScan)	84
US Billboard 200	91
US Top R&B/Hip-Hop Albums (Billboard)	24

== Certifications ==
Certifications and sales for The Life
Region	Certification	Certified units/sales
United States (RIAA)	Platinum	1,000,000^{^}
^{^} Shipments figures based on certification alone.
