= So Freakin' Tight =

Single by Tough Love

from the album Past Present Future (Unreleased)
- Released: 13 March 2015
- Recorded: 2014
- Genre: Deep house; UK garage
- Length: 2:41
- Label: Island
- Songwriter(s): DeVante Swing
- Producer(s): Tough Love

Tough Love singles chronology
| "Dreams" (2014) | "So Freakin' Tight" (2015) | "Pony (Jump on It)" (2015) |

"So Freakin' Tight" is a song by British duo Tough Love. It samples the Jodeci song "Freek'n You". It was released on 15 March 2015 as a digital download in the United Kingdom by Island Records. The song debuted at number 11 on the UK Singles Chart and number one on the UK Dance Chart.

== Charts ==
| Chart (2015) | Peak position |
|---|---|
| Scotland (OCC) | 14 |
| UK Singles (OCC) | 11 |
| UK Dance (OCC) | 1 |

== Release history ==
| Region | Date | Format | Label |
|---|---|---|---|
| Ireland | 13 March 2015 | Digital download | Island |
| United Kingdom | 15 March 2015 | Digital download | Island |
