= Tough Love (duo) =

British musical duo

- Origin: United Kingdom
- Genres: House
- Years active: 2011–present
- Label: Island Records
- Members: Stefan O'Brien
- Past members: Alex Wintton-Caine

Tough Love is an English DJ, music producer and the record label owner best known for their debut single "So Freakin' Tight", which peaked to number 11 on the UK Singles Chart. The duo were previously signed to Island Records through their own imprint Get Twisted Records.

== Career ==
Tough Love formed in 2011, and had created a cult following of hardcore dance music fans across the UK. Favourites across national radio stations including BBC Radio 1, 1xtra, Kiss, Kiss Fresh, Capital, Capital Xtra and Rinse FM, Tough Love earned support from broadcasters and DJs Annie Mac, Pete Tong, B Traits, Mark Fowler, Mad Alan, Danny Howard, MistaJam, Target as well as gaining industry respect from DJs such as Duke Dumont, Solomun, Kenny Dope, Todd Terry and Roger Sanchez.

They were labeled by Annie Mac on BBC Radio 1 as "one of the production teams we're excited for" and dubbed as "an act you need to look out for" by BBC Radio 1's Danny Howard. The duo have released on a series of established international labels, including Toolroom, Off, Nurvous, Suara and Kenny Dope's Dope Wax as well as their own imprint Get Twisted Records. They also won 'Best Single' at the 2014 Bass Music Awards for "Lonely Highway".

Tough Love provided remixes for Le Youth's "Real" and "Dance with Me", Clean Bandit & Jess Glynne's "Real Love" and "Aint Got Far to Go", Meghan Trainor's "All About That Bass" and Shift K3Y's "I Know".

In 2015, the duo scored two Top 40 hits with "So Freakin' Tight" (#11) and "Pony (Jump on It)" (#39) as well as cementing their underground prowess with a weekly residency for 'The Redlight' at Sankeys Ibiza alongside DJ EZ, Todd Terry and Matt Jam Lamont. They compiled and mixed The Redlight 2015 album which was released on Get Twisted Records charting in the national compilation chart. In the summer of 2015, Tough Love announced a joint venture deal between Get Twisted Records and Sony Columbia.

In September 2023, Wintton-Caine had left the group with O'Brien continuing Tough Love as a solo project.

In March 2026, Tough Love launched a new record label called The Night Is Calling Records, replacing Get Twisted Records.

== Radio ==
As of 2015, Tough Love held weekly radio shows on Kiss FM every Thursday at midnight and Kiss Fresh Fridays from 9 pm, showcasing their signature sound 'The Best of Big & Bumpy Basslines'. As of 2026, they have also hosted a syndicated radio show called "Get Twisted" since 2017, which is also available as a podcast.

== Discography ==
=== Extended plays ===
List of extended plays
Title	Details
Fake Faces	Released: 17 June 2013; Label: Cream Couture; Formats: Digital download
Dlnw	Released: 24 June 2016; Label: Undr The Radr; Formats: Digital download

=== Singles ===
List of singles as lead artist, with selected chart positions and certifications, showing year released and album name
Title	Year	Peak chart positions		Certifications	Album
Title	Year	UK	BEL	Certifications	Album
"Dreams"	2014	—	—		Non-album single
"So Freakin' Tight"	2015	11	71	Silver (UK), Gold (Ire) Gold (Fin), Gold (Pol)	Past Present Future (unreleased)
"Pony (Jump on It)" (featuring Ginuwine)	2015	39	—	Silver (UK)	Past Present Future (unreleased)
"What You Need Is Me" (featuring Nastaly)	2015	—	—		Non-album single
"Touch" (featuring Arlissa)	2016	—	—		Past Present Future (unreleased)
"Friday Night"	2016	–	—		Non-album single
"Like I Can" (with Karen Harding)	2016	—	—		Past Present Future (unreleased)
"Hold On" (with Roger Sanchez featuring Boy George)	2016	—	—		Non-album singles
"Dopamine"	2017	—	—		Non-album singles
"Like a Drug"	2017	—	—		Past Present Future (unreleased)
"Animal"	2017	—	—		Past Present Future (unreleased)
"Lose My Mind"	2017	—	—		Past Present Future (unreleased)
"Closer to Love" (featuring A*M*E)	2017	—	—		Past Present Future (unreleased)
"—" denotes a recording that did not chart or was not released in that territory.

=== Remix credits ===
- Craig David – Change My Love (Insanity / Sony)
- Chase & Status – All Goes Wrong (Mercury)
- Todd Terry – Cold Shoulder (Get Twisted / Sony)
- Sigala – Give Me Your Love Feat John Newman & Nile Rogers (MOS)
- X Ambassadors – "Unsteady" (Interscope)
- Jess Glynne – "Aint Got Far To Go" (Atlantic Records)
- Smokin Beats – "Dreams" (Hot Source / Circus)
- Marlon Roudette – "Erupting" (Syco / Sony)
- Alexa Goddard – "We Broke The Sky" (Roc Nation)
- Le Youth – "Real" (Epic Records)
- Clean Bandit & Jess Glynne – "Real Love" (Atlantic Records)
- Meghan Trainor – "All About That Bass" (Epic Records)
- Borgeous – "Invincible" (Spinnin Records / Champion Records)
- Shift K3Y – "I Know" (Columbia / Sony)
- Donae'o and Carnao Beats – "Gone in the Morning"
- Le Youth – "Dance With Me" (Epic Records)
- Jaguar Skills – "Hamburger"
- Doorly – "Rush" (Toolroom)
- Ruby Goe – "Badman"
- Jamiroquai - "Cloud 9" (Virgin Emi)
- Katy Perry - "Smile" (Capitol Records)

=== EPs ===
- "Friday Night" (Get Twisted)
- "DLNW" (Undr The Radr)
- "What You Need Is Me" Feat Nastaly (Get Twisted / Sony)
- Closed the Door featuring Nastaly (LouLou Records)
- Amine Edge & Dance VS Tough Love – The Perfect Love (Get Twisted Records)
- Dreams (Toolroom Records)
- Bring the Heat Volume 1 (Get Twisted Records)
- Loving You / Hating Me (Get Twisted Records)
- Tough Love & Taylor – In My Way (Off Recordings)
- Keep It Burning (Nervous Records)
- The Night Is Calling (Runnin' Wild Records)
- You've Been Cheating
- Taking Over
- Cold Blood

== Awards ==
- Bass House Music Awards "Best Single 2014" – winner
- DJ Mag "Best British Newcomer" – nominated
