= Back II da Basics =

Back II Da Basics

Studio album by Ginuwine
- Released: November 15, 2005
- Genre: R&B
- Length: 52:32
- Label: Epic
- Producer: Ginuwine (exec.); Jerry Vines (co-exec.); Big Bob; Brass N' Blues; Cap't Curt; Danja; Ill Factor; Keith Harris; Troy Oliver; Jazze Pha; Cedric Solomon; Trackmasters; Alvin West; Younglord

Ginuwine chronology
The Senior (2003)	Back II Da Basics (2005)	Greatest Hits (2006)

Singles from Back II Da Basics
- 1. "When We Make Love" Released: August 30, 2005; 2. "I'm in Love" Released: February 7, 2006

Back II da Basics is the fifth album by American recording artist Ginuwine. Released by Epic Records on November 15, 2005 in the United States, production for the album originally began in July 2003. Although Ginuwine initially revealed that he was planning to team with longtime contributor Timbaland on the entirety of the album, their collaboration failed to materialize due to scheduling conflicts. Instead, Ginuwine worked with a diverse roster of collaborators, including Danja, Jazze Pha, Troy Oliver, Trackmasters, and The Underdogs, on most of the tracks.

Upon its release, Back II da Basics received generally mixed reviews amongst critics with many complimenting the album's mid-tempo material and more mature approach, while criticizing its uptempo tracks and somewhat outdated nature. Commercially, it debuted at number twelve on the US Billboard 200 with first week sales of 74,430 copies, becoming Ginuwine's first album to miss the top ten since 1996's Ginuwine...the Bachelor, his solo debut. It debuted at number three on the Top R&B/Hip-Hop Albums chart, scoring him his fourth consecutive top-three entry.

The album spawned two singles, including lead single "When We Make Love" and "I'm In Love", both of which were not as successful as previous singles and failed to make the Billboard Hot 100. In support of the album, early in 2006 Ginuwine and label mates Jagged Edge linked up on the Ladies Night Out tour. A year later, Epic produced a greatest hits compilation with almost no promotion, presumably to end their album deal with Ginuwine.

== Background ==
In 2003, Ginuwine released The Senior, his fourth studio album. It debuted at number six on the US Billboard 200 with first-week sales of 122,000 unites. It later was certified gold by the Recording Industry Association of America (RIAA) for sales in excess of 863,000 copies. It produced three singles, each appearing on the Billboard Hot 100. Production for his fifth album began the same year. Ginuwine revealed on 106 & Park that he was working with Timbaland on the entirety of the album, however, their collaboration failed to materialize due to scheduling conflicts. On the production process, Ginuwine elaborated: "I want to bring R&B back up to the place where it needs to be."

== Critical response ==
Professional ratings
Review scores
Source	Rating
AllMusic	3/5 stars
Artistdirect	3/5 stars
Blender	2/5 stars
The Situation	3.5/5 stars
Vibe	3/5 stars

Back II da Basics received generally mixed reviews from music critics. In his review for Allmusic, Andy Kellman gave the album three out five stars and remarked that "rather than gradually spin out with albums that steadily diminish creatively and commercially, [Ginuwine] has put together a series of releases strong enough to maintain his presence on radio." Critical of the club tracks, he felt that without them the album "would be an even better, bolder, more mature release [with] lush ballads and gentle mid-tempo material." Sophia Jackson from The Situation found that "it's good to see that after a decade on the scene, Ginuwine can still hang out with the young ones in the over-populated R&B world. This is an above average comeback for Ginuwine fans and lovers of real back to the basics R&B to enjoy. Welcome back Ginuwine, you've been missed." Paul Lester found that A Man’s Thoughts "is quite a different proposition to his earlier work. It’s the same milieu – slick, glossy soul – but here the stark atmospheres and electro edge that once undercut his songs about sex and sensuality are replaced by a varnished efficiency that makes most of these 15 slow jams sound the same."

Vibe's Imani A. Dawson rated the album three discs out of five and commented that the release "builds on his silky vocals while keeping the sexual innuendo intact [...] he's slowly but surely growing up." She noted that "despite the occasional growing pains, when Ginuwine acts his age, it's a graceful erotic experience." Raymond Fiore from Entertainment Weekly felt that "for this R&B slickster, returning to da basics means regurgitating the assembly-line bump 'n' grind fare he's honed for a decade. And on his fifth disc, it also means being a few fancy footsteps behind the current pack of urban lotharios." Ken Capobianco of The Boston Globe found that "this consistent effort should get his career back in gear. It features a familiar mix of slow, lights-down-low grooves and bumping jams – and the songs and production are a notch above what he's been working with recently." Melody Charles from SoulTracks noted that "Ginuwine's latest is a solid and sincere comeback that his fans from the "Pony" days forward will appreciate [...] Thoughts moves seamlessly from the heady onset of physical attraction and desire to, well, the daily ups and downs that inevitably arrive in every relationship." Billboard wrote that the album "nicely upgrades from sexually laced anthems to break the party-boy mold."

== Commercial performance ==
Upon its release, Back II da Basics debuted at number three on Billboard's Top R&B/Hip-Hop Albums chart and number twelve on the Billboard 200 in the United States. It has sold 176,000 copies, according to Nielsen SoundScan.

== Track listing ==
No.	Title	Writer(s)	Producer(s)	Length
1.	"Intro" (featuring Knight)	Elgin Lumpkin; Ivan Corraliza	Ill Factor	2:51
2.	"Oh Girl"	Lumpkin; Richard Frierson	Younglord	3:54
3.	"Secrets"	Lumpkin; Johnta Austin; Phalon Alexander	Jazze Pha	3:29
4.	"When We Make Love"	Lumpkin; Cedric Solomon	Solomon	3:55
5.	"Want U to Be"	Lumpkin; Alexander; Charles Pettaway	Pha; Pettaway	4:20
6.	"The Club" (featuring Jadakiss)	Lumpkin; Jason Phillips; Keith Harris; Frierson	Younglord; Harris^{[a]}	3:54
7.	"Interlude" (featuring Knight)	Lumpkin; Corraliza	Ill Factor	2:24
8.	"She's Like"	Alvin West; Jean-Claude Olivier; Samuel Barnes	Poke and Tone; West^{[a]}	4:07
9.	"Betta Half"	Lumpkin; Nate Hills	Danjahandz	4:07
10.	"Glaze in My Eye"	Lumpkin; Alexander Mosley; Ryan Toby; Olivier; Barnes	Poke and Tone; Spanador^{[a]}	3:14
11.	"I'm in Love"	Lumpkin; Troy Oliver	Oliver	4:04
12.	"Far Away"	Lumpkin; Robert Gerongco; Samuel Gerongco	Brass N' Blues	4:13
13.	"Take a Chance"	Lumpkin; Bobby Terry; Curtis L. Williams; Jerry Vines	Cap't Curt; Big Bob	4:15
14.	"Back II da Basics"	Lumpkin; Corraliza	Ill Factor	3:42
15.	"Thank You's"	Lumpkin; Corraliza	Ill Factor	2:43

Circuit City bonus track
No.	Title	Writer(s)	Producer(s)	Length
16.	"Way Back"	Lumpkin; Frierson	Younglord	4:04

Japan bonus track
No.	Title	Writer(s)	Producer(s)	Length
16.	"Hold On Me"	Toby; Olivier; Barnes	Poke and Tone	3:34

Notes

- ^{^[a]} signifies a co-producer

== Credits ==
Visuals and imagery

- Alice Butts – art direction
- John J. Moore – design
- Eric Ogden – photography

Instruments and performance credits

- Johnta Austin – backing vocals
- Charles Pettaway – bass guitar, guitar
- Ced Keys International – keyboard

Technical and production

- Leslie Brathwaite – mixing
- Brass'n'Blues – producer
- Ivan Corraliza – engineer
- Captain Curt– producer
- Danjahandz – producer
- Jimmy Douglas – mixing
- Ginuwine – executive producers
- Jason Goldstein – mixing
- Keith Harris – producer
- Illfactor – producer
- Kevin Jackson – mixing
- David Kutch – mastering
- Troy Oliver – producer
- Charles Pettaway
- Jazze Pha – producer
- Poke & Tone – producer
- James Porte – engineer
- Nico Solis – engineer
- Cedric Solomon – producer
- Corey Stocker – engineer
- The Underdogs – producer
- Jerry Vines – executive producers
- Alvin West – producer
- Richard Younglord – producer
- Miles Walker – assistant engineer, mixing
- Doug Wilson – mixing

== Charts ==
=== Weekly charts ===
Weekly chart performance for Back II da Basics
Chart (2005)	Peak position
US Billboard 200	12
US Top R&B/Hip-Hop Albums (Billboard)	3

=== Year-end charts ===
Year-end chart performance for Back II da Basics
Chart (2006)	Position
US Top R&B/Hip-Hop Albums (Billboard)	67

== Release history ==
Release history for Back II da Basics
Region	Date	Label	Ref.
United States	November 15, 2005	Epic Records	
Japan	November 30, 2005	Sony Music Entertainment	
Spain	December 1, 2005	Sony Music Entertainment	
Germany	March 3, 2006	Sony Music Entertainment	
Switzerland	March 3, 2006	Sony Music Entertainment	
United Kingdom	March 6, 2006	Sony Music Entertainment	
