= Don't Be Shy (Belly song) =

Single by Belly featuring Nina Sky

from the album The Revolution
- Released: 2007
- Recorded: 2006–2007
- Genre: Hip hop, R&B
- Length: 3:51
- Label: Capital Prophets (CP) Records Inc.
- Songwriters: Ahmad Balshe, Nicole Albino, Natalie Albino
- Producer: Jason "DaHeala" Quenneville

Belly singles chronology
"Pressure" (2006)	"Don't Be Shy" (2007)	"I'm the Man" (2007)

Nina Sky singles chronology
"Maz Maiz" (2006)	"Don't Be Shy" (2007)	"Keep It Goin' Louder" (2009)

Music video
- "Don't Be Shy" on YouTube

"Don't Be Shy" is a song by Canadian rapper Belly. It's the second single from his debut album The Revolution (2007). The song features R&B girl group Nina Sky, who perform the song's chorus.

== Music video ==
Directed by Dan the Man, the video features Belly and Nina Sky performing behind backgrounds of various colors. There are appearances of female dancers in black and gold attire, various automobiles, a jaguar and a tiger that Belly has on a gold chain.

== Chart performance ==
The song debut at number 62 on the week of June 16, 2007. A week later, it hit a new peak at number 45. It stayed on the chart for an additional nine weeks.

Chart (2007)	Peak position
Canada Hot 100 (Billboard)	45
