= I'm in Love (Ginuwine song) =

Single by Ginuwine

from the album Back II Da Basics
- Released: February 7, 2006
- Length: 4:04
- Label: Epic
- Songwriters: Elgin Lumpkin; Troy Oliver
- Producer: Troy Oliver

Ginuwine singles chronology
"When We Make Love" (2005)	"I'm in Love" (2006)	"Pressure" (2006)

"I'm in Love" is a song by American recording artist Ginuwine. It was co-written and produced by Troy Oliver for his fifth studio album Back II Da Basics (2005). Released as the second and final single from the album, it reached number 69 on the US Hot R&B/Hip-Hop Songs chart.

== Credits and personnel ==
Credits lifted from the liner notes of Back II Da Basics.

- Jimmy Douglass – mixing engineer
- Ginuwine – vocals, writer
- Troy Oliver – producer, writer
- Jonathan Shorten – keyboards

== Charts ==
Chart (2006)	Peak position
US Hot R&B/Hip-Hop Songs (Billboard)	69
