= Last Chance (song) =

Single by Ginuwine

from the album A Man's Thoughts
- Released: March 31, 2009
- Length: 4:05
- Label: Notifi; Warner
- Songwriters: Adonis Shropshire; Bryan-Michael Cox; Wayne Wells
- Producer: Bryan-Michael Cox

Ginuwine singles chronology
| "Pressure" (2006) | "Last Chance" (2009) | "Trouble" (2009) |

"Last Chance" is a song by American singer Ginuwine. It was written by Wayne Wells, Adonis Shropshire, and Bryan-Michael Cox for his sixth studio album A Man's Thoughts (2009), with production helmed by the latter. Ginuwine commented that the song "reflects the maturity of my personal growth over the past few years." "Last Chance" was digitally released as the album's lead single on March 31, 2009. It debuted at number 84 on the US Billboard Hot 100, becoming his first entry on this chart since "Love You More" in 2003, and eventually peaked at number 63, while also reaching number three on the Hot R&B/Hip-Hop Songs.

== Background ==
"Last Chance" was written by Wayne Wells, Adonis Shropshire, and Bryan-Michael Cox, while production was helmed by the latter. In an interview with Blogcritics, Ginuwine explained: "When I come up with names of songs on a CD, it might actually mean more than what it's actually talking about. In this one, it really signified how I feel about the game and how I feel about myself in the game: If I don't do it right this time, this is my last chance. Another reason was because it was to me a hit [...] When I did it the first day, I knew that there was something special about that song. I still feel that regardless of how much success it has. In my heart I just felt that it was a special song."

== Music video ==
A music video for "Last Chance" was directed by Juwan Lee and filmed in Los Angeles, California. Singers Ray J and Tyrese Gibson, comedian Alex Thomas and fashion designer and actress LisaRaye all make appearances in the clip.

== Track listings ==
Digital single
| No. | Title | Writer(s) | Producer(s) | Length |
|---|---|---|---|---|
| 1. | "Last Chance" (Album Version) | Adonis Shropshire; Bryan-Michael Cox; Wayne Wells | Cox | 4:30 |
| 2. | "Last Chance" (Remix) | Shropshire; Cox; Wells | Cox | 4:01 |
| 3. | "Last Chance" (South Remix) | R. Vincent; Elgin Lumpkin; T. White | Dante Jackson | 4:49 |
| 4. | "Last Chance" (STL Remix) | Vincent; Lumpkin; White | Jackson | 7:30 |

== Charts ==
=== Weekly charts ===
| Chart (2009) | Peak position |
|---|---|
| US Billboard Hot 100 | 63 |
| US Hot R&B/Hip-Hop Songs (Billboard) | 3 |

=== Year-end charts ===
| Chart (2009) | Position |
|---|---|
| US Hot R&B/Hip-Hop Songs (Billboard) | 10 |
