= There It Is (Ginuwine song) =

Single by Ginuwine

from the album The Life
- Released: January 9, 2001
- Genre: R&B
- Length: 4:12
- Label: Epic
- Songwriter(s): Harold Garvin; Cliff Jones; Elgin Lumpkin; Bobby Terry; Jerry Vines; Curtis Williams
- Producer(s): Big Dog Productions

Ginuwine singles chronology
"You Owe Me" (2000)	"There It Is" (2001)	"Differences" (2001)

"There It Is" is a song by American singer Ginuwine. It was co-written by Harold Garvin, Cliff Jones, Bobby Terry, Jerry Vines, and Curtis Williams for his third studio album The Life (2001), while production was helmed by Jones and Vines for Big Dog Productions, with Ginuwine credited as a co-producer. The song was released as the album's lead single in January 2001 and peaked inside the Top 20 on the US Hot R&B/Hip-Hop Songs chart. The narrator describes how he works hard and pays the bills to provide a lifestyle for his live-in lover who does not have a job, but she does not show appreciation for what he does. Due to the content of the song (the use of the word "shit" in the bridge and chorus), a clean version tailor-made for radio play although only the original content was released on the album.

== Track listing ==
CD single
No.	Title	Length
1.	"There It Is" (Shit 4 Nothin)	4:12
2.	"There It Is" (Clean)	4:11
3.	"There It Is" (Rhythm Radio Mix)	4:01
4.	"There It Is" (Instrumental)	3:57
5.	"There It Is" (A Cappella)	4:10

== Credits and personnel ==
Credits lifted from the liner notes of The Life.

- Harold Garvin – writer
- Cliff Jones – producer, writer
- Ginuwine – co-production, vocals, writer
- Bobby Terry – writer
- Jerry Vines – producer, writer
- Curtis Williams – writer

== Charts ==
=== Weekly charts ===
Chart (2001)	Peak position
US Billboard Hot 100	66
US Hot R&B/Hip-Hop Songs (Billboard)	18

=== Year-end charts ===
Chart (2001)	Position
US Hot R&B/Hip-Hop Songs (Billboard)	79
