= A Ginuwine Christmas =

Studio album by Ginuwine
- Released: October 11, 2011
- Recorded: 2011
- Genres: Christmas, R&B
- Length: 32:01
- Labels: Notifi, Fontana

Ginuwine chronology
Elgin (2011)	A Ginuwine Christmas (2011)

A Ginuwine Christmas is the eighth studio album and first Christmas album by American R&B recording artist Ginuwine. It was released exclusively to digital media stores on October 10, 2011, via Notifi Records, comprising soulful interpretations of traditional holiday songs such as "Silent Night" and "Joy to the World ", along with love songs and sensual slow jams.

== Critical reception ==
A Ginuwine Christmas received generally mixed reviews from music critics. USA Today wrote that "perversely, Ginuwine slides [...] right into "Silent Night", and then veers back to more mainstream offerings, most of them original and romance-themed", while adding that "'All I Want' is particularly tasty, featuring his smooth, high tenor and harpsichord-inflected electronic keyboards." Critical with album, Mark Edward Nero from About.com rated it two out five stars. He found "the lack of focus would be easier to handle if the songs themselves were tight, but unfortunately Ginuwine's knack for making hits, which was at its height during the mid-to-late 1990s, has pretty much abandoned him in recent years. And this release makes that painfully obvious."

== Track listing ==
No.	Title	Writer(s)	Length
1.	"Mistletoe"	Michael Naylor	4:01
2.	"Silent Night"	Marlon Smith	1:18
3.	"Without You"	Elgin Lumpkin	3:33
4.	"All I Want"	Gregory Bowman	3:29
5.	"12 Days"	Smith	2:22
6.	"I Love Christmas"	Lumpkin	3:33
7.	"Christmas Letter"	Seneca Cayson	2:39
8.	"Joy to the World"	Cayson	3:00
9.	"Merry Christmas"	Melvin Rogers, Ted V. Clinkscale	4:05
10.	"Switch It Up"	Greg "G Ball" Meijors	4:01
