= Pressure (Belly song) =

Single by Belly featuring Ginuwine

from the album The Revolution
- Released: September 18, 2006
- Recorded: 2006
- Genre: Hip hop
- Length: 4:32
- Label: Capital Prophets (CP) Records Inc.
- Songwriters: Ahmad Balshe, Elgin Lumpkin
- Producer: Beat Merchant

Belly singles chronology
| "Rush the Floor" (2006) | "Pressure" (2006) | "Don't Be Shy" (2007) |

Ginuwine singles chronology
| "I'm in Love" (2006) | "Pressure" (2006) | "Last Chance" (2009) |

"Pressure" is the first single from Canadian rapper Belly's debut album, The Revolution. The song features established R&B artist Ginuwine, and it received heavy rotation on MuchMusic.

== Music video ==
The video, which features a cameo appearance by Hulk Hogan and his daughter Brooke Hogan, takes place at a nightclub where Belly and Ginuwine are surrounded by women. The video was directed by RT!.

== Chart positions ==
| Chart (2006–2007) | Peak position |
|---|---|
| Canada CHR/Top 40 (Billboard) | 11 |

== Awards and nominations ==
2007 MuchMusic Video Awards

- MuchVibe Best Rap Video (Won)
- Video of the Year (Nominated)
- Best Director - RT! (Nominated)
- Best Cinematography - Adam Marsden (Nominated)
