= Just Because (Ginuwine song) =

Single by Ginuwine

from the album The Life
- Released: August 17, 2001
- Length: 3:42
- Label: Epic
- Songwriters: Greg Lawson; Elgin Lumpkin; Damon Sharpe
- Producer: Ric Wake

Ginuwine singles chronology
"Differences" (2001)	"Just Because" (2001)	"Take Away" (2001)

"Just Because" is a song by American R&B singer Ginuwine. It was co-written by Greg Lawson and Damon Sharpe and recorded for his third studio album The Life (2001). Production on the track was helmed by Ric Wake, with additional production by Richie Jones. The song was released as the album's second international single in August 2001. "Just Because" reached the top 20 of the New Zealand Singles Chart.

== Background ==
"Just Because" was written by Ginuwine along with Greg Lawson and Damon Sharpe, while production was overseen by Ric Wake. Lawson and Richie Jones were also credited as additional producers. In a 2016 interview, Ginuwine commented on the song: "I hate that song. My label made me do that. There were deals made and I was like 'I’ll do it.' I had to do a video for it too. Have you seen the video? They were trying to make me pop. Now I see what they were trying to do. Back in the day, I was like 'I want to do this!.' It’s alright though."

== Music video ==
A music video for "Just Because" was directed by Francis Lawrence.

== Track listing ==
CD single
No.	Title	Producer(s)	Length
1.	"Just Because" (Album Version)	Ric Wake	3:41
2.	"Just Because" (Urban Radio Remix)	Wake; Andre Betts^{[a]}; Lock^{[a]}	3:36
3.	"Just Because" (After Hours Remix)	Wake; Betts^{[a]}; Lock^{[a]}	3:58
4.	"Just Because" (Bryan Michael Remix)	Wake; Bryan Michael Cox^{[a]}	3:53

Notes

- ^{^a} denotes additional producer

== Credits and personnel ==
Credits lifted from the liner notes of The Life.

- Ginuwine – vocals, writer
- Richie Jones – additional production
- Greg Lawson – additional production, writer
- Damon Sharpe – writer
- Ric Wake – producer

== Charts ==
Weekly chart performance for "Just Because"
Chart (2001)	Peak position
France (SNEP)	78
Germany (GfK)	74
New Zealand (Recorded Music NZ)	20
