= The Revolution (Belly album) =

Studio album by Belly
- Released: June 5, 2007 (Canada)
- Recorded: 2006–07
- Genre: Hip hop
- Length: 110:59
- Label: Capital Prophets (CP)
- Producers: Belly (exec.); Beat Merchant, Jason "DaHeala" Quenneville, Whosane?, Goggs, Bacardy

Belly chronology
The Revolution (2007)	Up for Days (2015)

Singles from The Revolution
- 1. "Pressure" Released: September 18, 2006; 2. "Don't Be Shy" Released: 2007; 3. "I'm the Man" Released: 2007; 4. "Ridin'" Released: 2007

The Revolution is the debut studio album by Canadian rapper, Belly which was released on June 5, 2007 in Canada on Capital Prophets Records Inc. The album became a commercial success a month after its release, when it was certified gold by the CRIA for shipping over 50,000 copies. The lead single "Pressure" won Best MuchVibe video at the 2007 MuchMusic Video Awards and also peaked at #10 on the Canadian Singles Chart. Also the album won the Rap Recording of the Year at the 2008 Juno Awards. All videos for the singles received heavy rotation on Much Music. In April 2008 for the 2008 MuchMusic Video Awards, "Ridin'" was nominated for 4 MMVAs and won 1 of them for best rap video. "I'm the Man" was also nominated for 1 MMVA making Belly the only artist that year to be nominated in 5 categories.

== Track listing ==
=== The People (disc one) ===
#	Title	Featuring Guest(s)	Time	Producer(s)
1	Hi Haters		2:19	Beat Merchant
2	Revolutionary		4:49	
3	Obsessions		5:00	
4	I Swear	Scarface	4:11	
5	If I Don't		4:55	
6	Ya Dunya	Massari	3:49	
7	People Change		3:23	Whosane?
8	I'm the Man	Kurupt	4:59	Bacardy
9	I Ain't No Pimp		3:31	DaHeala
10	B Variable		3:21	Whosane?
11	History Of Violence		5:13	Whosane?
12	Goodbye	Monique	4:40	
13	Leave Me Alone		4:25	
14	Follow Me		4:10	

=== The System (disc two) ===
#	Title	Featuring Guest(s)	Time	Producer(s)
1	So Cold		4:12	
2	The Freshest	Fabolous	4:10	
3	Ridin'	Mario Winans	4:30	
4	Kill for You		4:13	
5	Don't Be Shy	Nina Sky	3:51	Scott Storch
6	Good Evening	Kurupt	4:18	DaHeala
7	The Chronic Break		0:44	
8	For the Love		3:53	DaHeala
9	How You		3:39	
10	Magic	Dru	3:28	
11	Pressure	Ginuwine	4:34	Scott Storch
12	Stomp On 'Em		4:39	
13	Welcome to the Jungle	Monique	2:45	
14	On the Low		3:18	

== Charts ==
Chart (2007)	Peak position
Canadian Albums (Billboard)	27
