= Elgin (album) =

Studio album by Ginuwine
- Released: February 15, 2011
- Length: 51:14
- Label: Notifi; E1
- Producer: Melvin "Saint Nick" Coleman; Bryan-Michael Cox; Ginuwine; MaddScientist; Tank; Tapping Warren; WyldCard; Young Yonny

Ginuwine chronology
A Man's Thoughts (2009)	Elgin (2011)	A Ginuwine Christmas (2011)

Singles from Elgin
- 1. "What Could Have Been" Released: October 25, 2010; 2. "Heaven" Released: January 17, 2011

Elgin is the seventh studio album by American R&B singer Ginuwine. It was released by Notifi Music Group and E1 Music on February 15, 2011. His second album with Notifi, the album takes its title from Ginuwine's first name, the singer worked with producers Bryan-Michael Cox, Tapping Warren, Kendrick Dean, Melvin "Saint Nick" Coleman, MaddScientist, and Tank on the album. Songwriter and rapper Trina appears as a guest vocalist on the album track "Batteries."

The album received a mixed reception by music critics, many of whom praised Ginuwine's vocal performances and the album's trend-detaching nature but found its lyrics unsuitable and cliché-addled. Upon its release, Elgin debuted at number 30 on the US Billboard 200, and at number seven on Billboard's Top R&B/Hip-Hop Albums chart with first week sales of 19,100 copies. The album produced two singles, "What Could Have Been" and "Heaven".

== Singles ==
The album was preceded by lead single "What Could Have Been", released on October 25, 2010. The song peaked at number 61 on the US Hot R&B/Hip-Hop Songs chart and reached top 20 on the Adult R&B Songs, peaking at number 15. A second single, "Heaven," was released in January 2011, but failed to chart. Ginuwine also filmed and released two promo music videos for "Break" and "Drink of Choice".

== Critical reception ==
Professional ratings
Review scores
Source	Rating
About.com	3/5 stars
AllMusic	3/5 stars

Allison Stewart, writing for The Washington Post, called the album "a solid if slightly anonymous disc that makes plain the problems facing veteran balladeers. Ginuwine got older, got married and gradually began to emphasize the crooner side of his persona, just as electro-centric R&B began to gain traction. And now he's stuck, his limber, velvet ribbon of a voice forced to resort to making unctuous Diane Warren ballads seem sincere and interesting and mostly not succeeding, while Ne-Yo has all the fun." Lauren Carter from The Boston Herald remarked that "the majority of the 40-year-old’s seventh album is smoothed-out adult contemporary fare that ranges from steamy to snoozy." She found that "despite the lapses in songwriting, Ginuwine's voice retains an emotive, almost haunting, quality and frequently shines."

AllMusic editor Andy Kellman rated the album three out of five stars and found that while a handful of "tracks would be better suited for younger singers, roughly half the album has Ginuwine acting his age, dealing with adult situations [...] Best of all is "Frozen"; audible shivering sounds overstate the mood projected by a scorned object of affection, but frost-coated synthesizers provide great contrast to Ginuwine's sympathetic pleading." Mark Edward Nero from About.com called the album "stylish [and] sophisticated," but found that "unfortunately some of the albums songs lack the passion of his earlier releases [...] It's actually the more uptempo tracks on Elgin that please the most [...] Ginuwine could have tried to hop on the latest trends with this album in an effort to attract more young listeners, but to his credit, he acts his age throughout Elgin and shows that he's still got the power as a vocalist to charm the masses, even if his songs lack some of the creativity of his youth."

== Chart performance ==
Elgin debuted at number 30 on the US Billboard 200 and number seven on the Top R&B/Hip-Hop Albums chart, with 19,100 copies sold in the first week. It marked Ginuwine's lowest opening sales up to then and was a considerable decline from his previous effort A Man's Thoughts, which had opened to sales of 38,000 units in 2009.

== Track listing ==
Elgin track listing
No.	Title	Writer(s)	Producer(s)	Length
1.	"Heaven"	Durrell Babbs	Tank	3:53
2.	"Break"	Diane Warren	Tapping Warren	4:03
3.	"What Could Have Been"	Elgin Lumpkin	Melvin "Saint Nick" Coleman; Ginuwine; Attozio	3:32
4.	"Drink of Choice"	Adonis Shropshire; Bryan-Michael Cox	Cox; Kendrick "WyldCard" Dean	4:46
5.	"Why We're Fighting"	Lumpkin	Coleman	3:54
6.	"Body"	Lumpkin	Coleman	3:32
7.	"Batteries" (featuring Trina)	Lumpkin	Young Yonny	3:32
8.	"Kidnapped"	Lumpkin; A. Wright; J. Smith	Coleman	3:07
9.	"How Does Your Heart Forget"	D. Warren	MaddScientist; T. Warren	3:37
10.	"First Time"	Lumpkin	Ginuwine	3:53
11.	"Frozen"	Sir Darryl Farris; Davion Farris; Daniel Farris; Myles Sims	Cox; WyldCard	4:48

iTunes bonus tracks
No.	Title	Writer(s)	Producer(s)	Length
12.	"Busy"	Lumpkin	Cox; WyldCard	3:33
13.	"Batteries" (remix; feat. Ms. Bee, Trina, & Jose)	Lumpkin	Yonny	3:30
14.	"First Time" (piano mix)	Dean; Lumpkin	Dean	4:14

== Personnel ==
Credits lifted from the liner notes of Elgin.

- Rebecca Alexis – Stylist
- Durrell Babbs – Composer
- Joseph "Lonny" Bereal – Composer
- Jayshawn Champion – Composer, Vocals (Background)
- Ted Clinkscale – Composer
- Melvin Coleman – Composer, Programming
- Melvin "Saint Nick" Coleman – Composer, Producer
- Bryan-Michael Cox – Arranger, Executive Producer, Producer
- Kendrick Dean – Composer
- Ira Dewitt – Executive Producer
- Earnest "Bishop Young Don" Dixon – Composer
- Daniel Farris – Composer
- Darryl Farris – Composer
- Davion Farris – Composer
- Sean Fenton – Composer
- Jerry "Texx" Franklin – Composer
- Brian Gardner – Mastering
- Stephen Garnett – Photography
- Ginuwine – Primary Artist, Vocals (Background)
- Roz Harell – A&R
- R.L. Huggar – Composer, Vocals (Background)
- Olivier "Oli" Jean Joseph – Composer
- Keith Ketcham – Art Direction, Design
- Elgin Lumpkin – Composer
- Riley Mackin – Engineer, Mixing
- John McGee – Composer, Producer
- Michael Naylor – Composer, Producer
- Robert Newt – Composer
- Saint Nick – Composer, Vocal Producer, Vocals (Background)
- Reginald Saunders – Composer
- Adonis Shropshire – Composer
- Myles Sims – Composer
- James "J-Doe" Smith – Composer
- James "Jayshawn" Smith – Composer
- Ced Solo – Producer
- Cedric Solomon – Composer
- Kristina Stephens – Composer
- Tank – Vocals (Background)
- Katrina Taylor – Composer
- Sam Thomas – Engineer, Mixing
- Atozzio Towns – Composer, Vocals (Background)
- J. Valentine – Composer
- Diane Warren – Composer, Lyricist
- Wayne Wells – Composer
- Tyler Widman – Mixing
- Young Yonny – Producer

== Charts ==
Chart performance for Elgin
Chart (2011)	Peak position
US Billboard 200	30
US Top R&B/Hip-Hop Albums (Billboard)	7

== Release history ==
Release history for Elgin
Region	Date	Format(s)	Label	Ref.
Various	February 15, 2011	CD; digital download	Notifi; E1	
