= Differences (song) =

2001 single by Ginuwine

Single by Ginuwine

from the album The Life
- Released: June 12, 2001
- Genre: R&B
- Length: 4:25 (album version); 4:08 (radio edit)
- Label: Epic
- Songwriters: Elgin Lumpkin; Troy Oliver
- Producer: Troy Oliver

Ginuwine singles chronology
"There It Is" (2001)	"Differences" (2001)	"Just Because" (2001)

Music video
- "Differences" on YouTube

"Differences" is an R&B song by American singer Ginuwine. It was written by him alongside producer Troy Oliver and recorded for Ginuwine's third studio album, The Life (2001). Released as the album's second single in June 2001, the song spent four weeks at number one on the US Billboard Hot R&B/Hip-Hop Singles & Tracks chart and peaked at number four on the Billboard Hot 100. It was ranked at numbers 50 and 68 in the 2001 and 2002 on the Billboard year-end rankings, respectively, and was certified gold by the Recording Industry Association of America (RIAA). American rapper Pop Smoke sampled "Differences" for his 2020 song "What You Know Bout Love".

== Background ==
"Differences" was written by Ginuwine along with Troy Oliver, while production was helmed by the latter. In an interview with Blogcritics, Ginuwine commented on the background to the track: "That song was really during a time when I was going through a depressed state because of my dad and my mom had passed. We're writing a whole bunch of songs [...] I said, 'I'm going to write a song about [my wife]', and it happened to be a song that a lot of people wanted to sing to their wives when they were getting married. It's just one of those songs that will always be here. I'm just happy I'm the one that did it."

== Chart performance ==
Released as the second single from The Life, "Differences" peaked at number one on the US Billboard Hot R&B/Hip-Hop Singles & Tracks chart on the week of October 6, 2001, becoming his second single to do so. A precedent on the chart, it became the first track to reach the summit without a physical single being available at retail. In New Zealand, "Differences" was released as a double A-side with previous single "Just Because", reaching number 20 on the RIANZ Singles Chart.

== Music video ==
A music video for "Differences" was directed by Hype Williams. A special effects-heavy clip, Ginuwine elaborated on the video shooting in an interview with MTV News: "Actually, the game plan going into [the shoot] was [to] talk to God. Williams was like, 'Look man this gotta be heartfelt. People gotta know you mean this.' He was saying, 'The only way they're gonna know you're meaning it is if you close your eyes and you just talk to God.' I was very skeptical about it 'cause I was just [in front of] a green screen all day. I just had to imagine – he was just telling me what is gonna be where."

== Track listing ==
CD single
No.	Title	Producer(s)	Length
1.	"Differences" (album version)	Troy Oliver	4:26
2.	"Differences" (Kenny Diaz mix)	Oliver; Kenny Diaz^{[a]}	3:59
3.	"Differences" (Mike Rizzo radio mix)	Oliver; Mike Rizzo^{[a]}	3:29
4.	"Differences" (video)

Notes

- ^{^a} denotes additional producer

== Charts ==
=== Weekly charts ===
Chart (2001–2002)	Peak position
Netherlands (Dutch Top 40 Tipparade)	2
Netherlands (Single Top 100)	43
New Zealand (Recorded Music NZ) with "Just Because"	20
US Billboard Hot 100	4
US Hot R&B/Hip-Hop Songs (Billboard)	1
US Pop Airplay (Billboard)	14
US Rhythmic Airplay (Billboard)	2

=== Year-end charts ===
Chart (2001)	Position
US Billboard Hot 100	50
US Hot R&B/Hip-Hop Singles & Tracks (Billboard)	13
US Rhythmic Top 40 (Billboard)	37

Chart (2002)	Position
US Billboard Hot 100	68
US Hot R&B/Hip-Hop Singles & Tracks (Billboard)	54
US Mainstream Top 40 (Billboard)	66
US Rhythmic Top 40 (Billboard)	37

== Certifications ==
Region	Certification	Certified units/sales
New Zealand (RMNZ)	Platinum	30,000^{‡}
United Kingdom (BPI)	Silver	200,000^{‡}
United States (RIAA)	Gold	500,000^{^}
^{^} Shipments figures based on certification alone.^{‡} Sales+streaming figures based on certification alone.
