= When We Make Love (Ginuwine song) =

Single by Ginuwine

from the album Back II Da Basics
- Released: August 30, 2005
- Length: 3:55
- Label: Epic
- Songwriters: Ernest Dixon; Cedric Solomon
- Producer: Cedric Solomon

Ginuwine singles chronology
"Love You More" (2003)	"When We Make Love" (2005)	"I'm in Love" (2006)

"When We Make Love" is a song by American recording artist Ginuwine, taken from his fifth studio album Back II Da Basics (2005). It was written by Ernest Dixon and Cedric Solomon, while production was helmed by the latter. Released as the album's first single, it peaked at number 51 on the US Hot R&B/Hip-Hop Songs, becoming his lowest-charting leading single up to then.

== Track listing ==
CD single
No.	Title	Length
1.	"When We Make Love" (Radio Edit)	3:22
2.	"When We Make Love" (Album Version)	3:59
3.	"When We Make Love" (Instrumental)	3:59
4.	"When We Make Love" (Callout Hook)	0:14

== Credits and personnel ==
Credits lifted from the liner notes of Back II Da Basics.

- Ivan Corraliza – recording engineer
- Ernest Dixon – writer
- Ginuwine – vocals
- Jason Goldstein – mixing engineer
- Dave Kutch – mastering engineer
- Cerdric Solomon – writer

== Charts ==
Chart (2005)	Peak position
US Hot R&B/Hip-Hop Songs (Billboard)	51
