= Pony (Ginuwine song) =

1996 single by Ginuwine

Single by Ginuwine

from the album Ginuwine... the Bachelor
- B-side: "Hello"
- Written: 1989, 1994
- Released: July 30, 1996
- Recorded: 1994
- Genre: R&B
- Length: 5:25 (album version); 4:13 (radio edit)
- Label: 550; Epic
- Songwriters: Elgin Lumpkin; Timothy Mosley; Stephen Garrett
- Producer: Timbaland

Ginuwine singles chronology
"Pony" (1996)	"Tell Me Do U Wanna" (1997)

Music video
- "Pony" on YouTube

"Pony" is a song by American singer and songwriter Ginuwine, released in July 1996, by 550 and Epic Records, as the debut single from his first album, Ginuwine... the Bachelor (1996). Ginuwine co-wrote the song with Swing Mob associates Static Major and Timbaland; the latter made his breakthrough as a producer with the song. Upon its release, the song was met with acclaim from music critics, and it peaked at numbers six and eight on the US Billboard Hot 100 and Cash Box Top 100 charts, and number one on the Billboard Hot R&B Singles chart. The accompanying music video was directed by Michael Lucero and depicts Ginuwine in a Californian Western bar.

== Production ==
Timbaland, the song's producer, revealed in a MasterClass lecture that the song's instrumental was created in 1989, and that the song was written and recorded in 1994, two years prior to its release.

== Critical reception ==
"Pony" was met with critical acclaim. Larry Flick from Billboard magazine wrote, "This sex jam, played out through horse-riding metaphors, is an even-metered gallop through lovely backing vocals and machine-generated music." He added, "While lead vocal elements are indistinguishable from several similar jams receiving heavy play, 'Ginuwine' makes up for it with endearing style and funk. Added vocals run though a synthesizer provide a unique supplemental element to the bassline and act as an interesting refrain." The song received an A− from Matt Diehl for Entertainment Weekly, who said that its "irresistible funk grooves lope at an easy gait, seducing the listener with a velvety tenor and belching synthesizer hook". Tony Farsides from Music Week's RM Dance Update gave it a full score of five out of five and named it Tune of the Week. He noted that "given the downtempo mania that's dominated R&B in recent years, it's refreshing to hear a solid uptempo track instead. [...] All in all, a great track and hopefully a deserving hit as well."

== Commercial performance ==
The song peaked at number one on the US Billboard Hot R&B Singles chart for two weeks from November 16, 1996, to November 30, 1996, and reached number six on Billboard's Hot 100 on November 23, 1996. Internationally, the song reached number three in Australia, peaked at number five in New Zealand, and charted within the top 40 in several European countries.

== Music video ==
The official music video for the album version of the song, directed by American director Michael Lucero and filmed at the Cowboy Palace saloon in Chatsworth, California, depicts Ginuwine and his crew entering a Western bar as strangers and gradually gaining the favor of the cowboy-patrons. The music video for the remix version of the song (the "Ride It" mix) was directed by Christopher Erskin and shot in a factory.

== Live performances ==
Ginuwine performed the song live on Soul Train on November 23, 1996.

== Legacy ==
Along with his concurrent work for Aaliyah's One in a Million album, "Pony" and Ginuwine...the Bachelor marked the emergence of Timbaland as a successful R&B producer. The song experienced a resurgence in popularity after being featured in the 2012 film Magic Mike, its 2015 sequel Magic Mike XXL, and its 2023 sequel Magic Mike's Last Dance. On November 2, 2019, the song was featured in the sketch "Hungry Jury" on Saturday Night Live.

In 2021, the duo Altégo posted a snippet of a mashup of "Pony" and Britney Spears's "Toxic" on TikTok, which quickly went viral. In January 2022, the mashup was completed and officially released through Sony Music Entertainment under the title "Toxic Pony", being credited to Altégo, Spears and Ginuwine. The mashup reached number 40 on the Billboard Pop Airplay chart.

In 2023, the alternative rock band Slothrust released a cover of the song on their album “I Promise”. This included an extended version, an a cappella version, and an instrumental version.

The song was briefly featured in a sneak peek of the 2025 Marvel Studios film Thunderbolts*.

== Track listings ==
- US and Australian single
1. "Pony" (album version) – 4:13
2. "Pony" (extended mix) – 5:20
3. "Pony" (instrumental) – 5:18
4. "Pony" (a cappella) – 3:48
- European CD single
1. "Pony" (album version) – 5:25
2. "Hello" – 4:06
- UK CD single
1. "Pony" (album version) – 4:13
2. "Pony" (extended mix) – 5:20
3. "Pony" (Ride It mix) – 5:05
4. "Pony" (Mad Love club mix) – 4:32
5. "Pony" (Mad Love beat mix) – 4:29
6. "Pony" (Black Market Slowride mix) – 4:31
- UK cassette single
1. "Pony" (album version edit) – 4:13
2. "Pony" (extended mix) – 5:20
3. "Pony" (Mad Love mix) – 4:32
- UK 12-inch single

A1. "Pony" (extended mix) – 5:20
A2. "Pony" (Ride It mix) – 5:05
A3. "Pony" (Mad Love club mix) – 4:32
B1. "Pony" (Ronin mix) – 4:14
B2. "Pony" (Mad Love beat mix) – 4:29
B3. "Pony" (Black Market Slowride mix) – 4:31

== Charts ==
=== Weekly charts ===
Chart (1996–1997)	Peak position
Australia (ARIA)	3
Belgium (Ultratip Bubbling Under Flanders)	4
Belgium (Ultratop 50 Wallonia)	30
Canada (Nielsen SoundScan)	20
Canada Dance/Urban (RPM)	4
Europe (Eurochart Hot 100)	28
France Airplay (SNEP)	52
Germany (GfK)	22
Iceland (Íslenski Listinn Topp 40)	28
Netherlands (Dutch Top 40)	7
Netherlands (Single Top 100)	8
New Zealand (Recorded Music NZ)	5
Poland Airplay (Music & Media)	10
Scottish Singles Sales (Official Charts)	57
Sweden (Sverigetopplistan)	16
Switzerland (Schweizer Hitparade)	29
UK Singles (Official Charts)	16
UK Dance (Official Charts)	10
UK Hip Hop/R&B (Official Charts)	3
US Billboard Hot 100	6
US Dance Singles Sales (Billboard)	17
US Hot R&B/Hip-Hop Songs (Billboard)	1
US Pop Airplay (Billboard)	28
US Rhythmic Airplay (Billboard)	4
US Cash Box Top 100	8

Chart (2015)	Peak position
Australia (ARIA)	31
France (SNEP)	171
Germany (GfK)	92
UK Singles (Official Charts)	62

=== Year-end charts ===
Chart (1996)	Position
US Billboard Hot 100	72
US Hot R&B Singles (Billboard)	32
US Top 40/Rhythm-Crossover (Billboard)	34

Chart (1997)	Position
Australia (ARIA)	22
Germany (Media Control)	85
Netherlands (Dutch Top 40)	70
US Billboard Hot 100	62
US Hot R&B Singles (Billboard)	30
US Rhythmic Top 40 (Billboard)	26
US Top 40/Mainstream (Billboard)	81

== Certifications ==
Region	Certification	Certified units/sales
Australia (ARIA)	Platinum	70,000^{^}
Denmark (IFPI Danmark)	Platinum	90,000^{‡}
Germany (BVMI)	Gold	250,000^{‡}
New Zealand (RMNZ)	4× Platinum	120,000^{‡}
United Kingdom (BPI)	2× Platinum	1,200,000^{‡}
United States (RIAA) Physical	Platinum	1,000,000^{^}
United States Digital	—	1,301,019
^{^} Shipments figures based on certification alone.^{‡} Sales+streaming figures based on certification alone.

== Release history ==
Region	Version	Date	Format(s)	Label(s)	Ref(s).
United States	Original	July 30, 1996	Rhythmic contemporary radio	550 Music	
United States	Original	August 20, 1996	12-inch vinyl; cassette	550 Music	
Japan	Original	October 21, 1996	CD	Epic Japan	
United Kingdom	Original	January 13, 1997	12-inch vinyl; CD; cassette	550 Music; Epic	
Various	"Toxic Pony"	January 21, 2022	Digital download; streaming	Sony Music	

== "Pony (Jump on It)" ==
"Pony (Jump on It)"

Single by Tough Love featuring Ginuwine

from the album Past Present Future (Unreleased)
- Released: August 7, 2015
- Recorded: 2015
- Genre: House
- Length: 3:03
- Label: Island
- Songwriters: Elgin Lumpkin; Timothy Mosley; Stephen Garrett
- Producer: Tough Love

Tough Love singles chronology
"So Freakin' Tight" (2015)	"Pony (Jump on It)" (2015)	"Touch" (2016)

Ginuwine singles chronology
"I Need" (2013)	"Pony (Jump on It)" (2015)

Music video
- "Pony (Jump on It)" on YouTube

British house music duo Tough Love collaborated with Ginuwine and revamped the song, which was released on August 7, 2015, as their second single.

=== Track listings ===
Digital download – single
No.	Title	Length
1.	"Pony (Jump on It)" (featuring Ginuwine) (Radio Mix))	3:03

Digital download – EP
No.	Title	Length
1.	"Pony (Jump on It)" (Extended Mix)	4:10
2.	"Pony (Jump on It)" (Cause & Affect Remix)	4:39
3.	"Pony (Jump on It)" (VIP Mix)	5:17
4.	"Pony (Jump on It)" (Kove Remix)	4:13
5.	"Pony (Jump on It)" (Sick Individuals Remix)	5:06
6.	"Pony (Jump on It)" (DJ Q Remix)	5:09

=== Charts ===
Chart (2015)	Peak position
Scottish Singles Sales (Official Charts)	36
UK Singles (Official Charts)	39
UK Dance (Official Charts)	12

=== Certifications ===
Region	Certification	Certified units/sales
United Kingdom (BPI)	Silver	200,000^{‡}
^{‡} Sales+streaming figures based on certification alone.

=== Release history ===
Country	Date	Format	Label
Ireland	August 7, 2015	Digital download	Island
United Kingdom	August 7, 2015	Digital download	Island

== See also ==
- R&B number-one hits of 1996 (USA)
