= Stingy (song) =

Single by Ginuwine

from the album Barbershop (Music From the Motion Picture) and The Senior
- Released: June 25, 2002
- Length: 4:23
- Label: Epic
- Songwriters: Johnta Austin; Bryan-Michael Cox; Jason Perry
- Producer: Bryan-Michael Cox

Ginuwine singles chronology
"I Need a Girl (Part Two)" (2002)	"Stingy" (2002)	"Crush Tonight" (2002)

"Stingy" is a song by American R&B singer Ginuwine. It was written by Johnta Austin, Bryan-Michael Cox, and Jason Perry and recorded by the singer for soundtrack of the American comedy-drama film Barbershop (2002), then included on his fourth album The Senior the following year. Production on the song was helmed by Cox, with co-production from Perry. Released as the lead single from the Barbershop soundtrack, "Stingy" peaked at number 33 on the US Billboard Hot 100 and reached the top ten of the Hot R&B/Hip-Hop Songs chart.

== Track listing ==
CD single
No.	Title	Writer(s)	Producer(s)	Length
1.	"Stingy" (Radio Edit)	Bryan Michael Cox; Jason Perry; Johnta Austin	Cox; Perry^{[a]}	3:56
2.	"Stingy" (Album Version)	Cox; Perry; Austin	Cox; Perry^{[a]}	4:20
3.	"Stingy" (Call Out Hook)	Cox; Perry; Austin	Cox; Perry^{[a]}	0:30

2-track single
No.	Title	Writer(s)	Producer(s)	Length
1.	"Stingy" (Radio Edit)	Cox; Perry; Austin	Cox; Perry^{[a]}	4:20
2.	"Stingy" (featuring Baby)	R. Kelly; Bryan Williams	Kelly; Ginuwine^{[b]}	3:59

Notes

- ^{^a} denotes additional producer
- ^{^b} denotes co-producer

== Credits and personnel ==
Credits lifted from the liner notes of The Senior.

- Algebra – background vocals
- Johnta Austin – background vocals, writer
- Bubble – recording engineer
- Bryan-Michael Cox – instruments, producer, writer
- Ginuwine – background vocals, lead vocals
- Jason Perry – co-producer, guitar, writer
- Sean Thomas – pro-tools editor

== Charts ==
=== Weekly charts ===
Weekly chart performance for "Stingy"
Chart (2002)	Peak position
US Billboard Hot 100	33
US Hot R&B/Hip-Hop Songs (Billboard)	7
US Adult R&B Songs (Billboard)	19

=== Year-end charts ===
Year-end chart performance for "Stingy"
Chart (2002)	Position
US Hot R&B/Hip-Hop Songs (Billboard)	36
