= Troy Oliver =

American singer-songwriter

Troy Oliver is an American multi-instrumentalist, record producer and songwriter born in New Haven, Connecticut, United States. He wrote and produced "Jenny from the Block" and "I’m Real" for Jennifer Lopez, and "Differences" for Ginuwine.
