= Ginuwine =

American singer (born 1970)

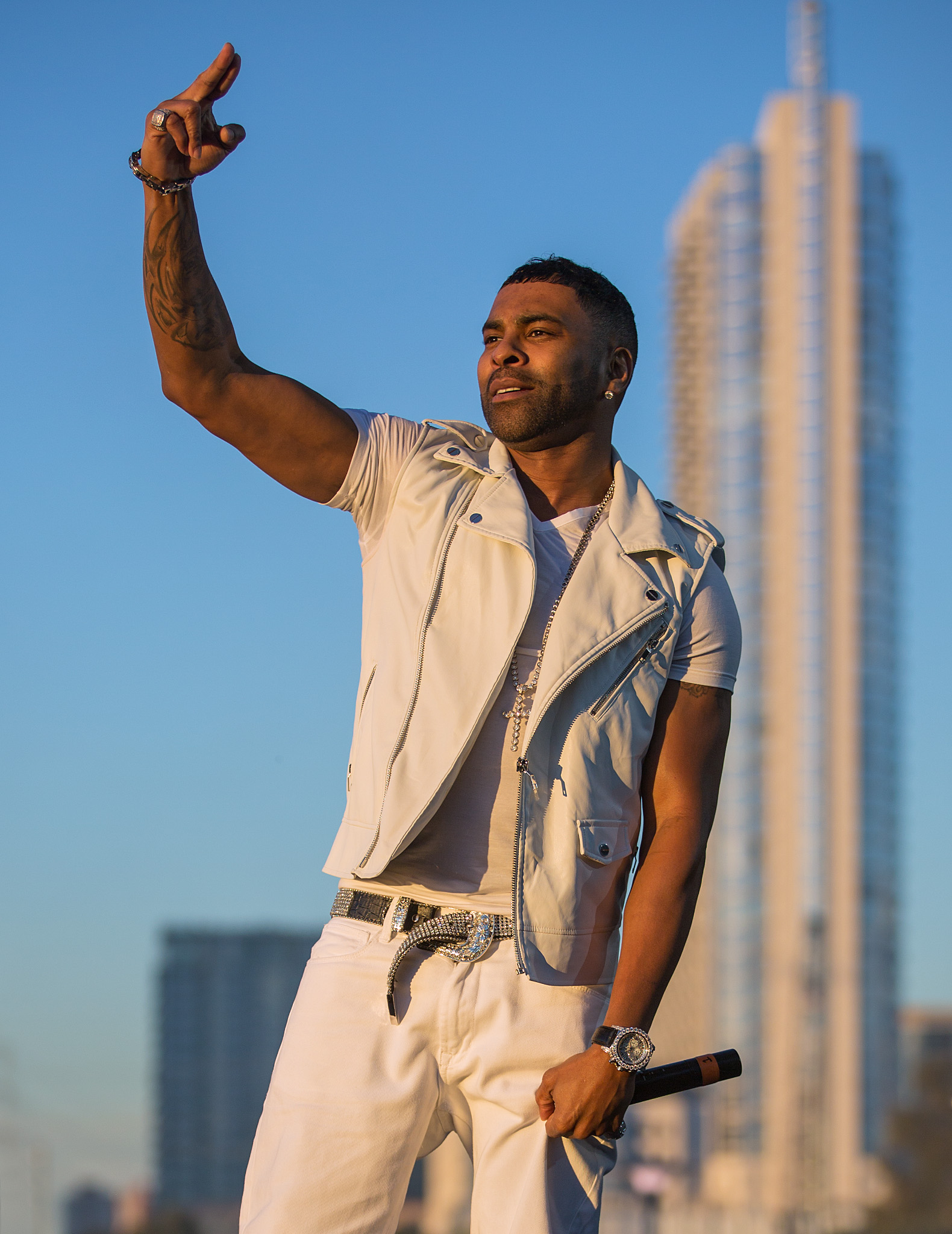
- Ginuwine performing in 2014

Background information
- Also known as: Tornado
- Born: Elgin Baylor Lumpkin; October 15, 1970 (age 56); Washington, D.C., U.S.
- Origin: Forestville, Maryland, U.S.
- Genre: R&B
- Occupations: Singer; songwriter
- Works: Ginuwine discography
- Years active: 1991–present
- Labels: Atlantic; Notifi; Fontana; E1; Warner Bros.; Asylum; Sony; 550; Epic
- Formerly of: TGT; Swing Mob
- Children: 7

Elgin Baylor Lumpkin (born October 15, 1970), better known by his stage name Ginuwine (/ˈdʒɪnjuwaɪn/ JIN-yoo-wyn), is an American R&B singer. He began his career as a member of the musical collective Swing Mob in the early 1990s. As a solo act, he signed with Epic Records to release his 1996 debut single, "Pony". The song peaked at number six on the Billboard Hot 100 and preceded the release of his debut studio album, Ginuwine...the Bachelor (1996), which received double platinum certification by the Recording Industry Association of America (RIAA). His second and third albums, 100% Ginuwine (1999) and The Life (2001), both peaked within the top five of the Billboard 200, while the latter spawned the single "Differences", which peaked at number four on the Billboard Hot 100 and remains his highest-charting song.

His fourth album, The Senior (2003), spawned the top ten single "In Those Jeans", as well as the top 40 singles "Hell Yeah" (featuring Birdman) and "Stingy". His fifth, Back II da Basics (2005) peaked within the top ten of the Billboard 200 and served as his final release with Epic; he signed with Warner Records to release his sixth album A Man's Thoughts (2009), which performed similarly despite mixed critical reception. His albums Elgin (2011) and A Ginuwine Christmas (2011) followed thereafter.

According to Billboard, as of 2013, Ginuwine has sold an estimated 6.98 million albums in the US. Aside from his solo career, he formed the R&B trio TGT alongside contemporaries Tyrese Gibson and Tank in 2007, with whom he has released one studio album.

== Early life ==
Elgin Baylor Lumpkin was born on October 15, 1970, in Washington, D.C. He is named after NBA legend Elgin Baylor, a fellow D.C. native. In 1988, he graduated from Forestville High School (later known as Forestville Military Academy) in Forestville, Maryland, and later graduated from Prince George's Community College in Largo, Maryland, with a paralegal associate's degree.

== Career ==
=== Music ===
Lumpkin began his career as a member of Swing Mob, a Rochester, New York-based record label and music compound founded by Donald "DeVante Swing" DeGrate, Jodeci, Chad Elliott, and Darryl Pearson. There, he met rapper Melissa "Missy" Elliott, rapper Melvin "Magoo" Barcliff, producer Steven "Stevie J" Jordan, singer-songwriter and rapper Stephen "Static Major" Garrett, Benjamin Digital Black Bush, producer-singer Jawaan Smoke E. Digglera Peacock, singers Leshawn Shellman, Radiah Scott, Chonita Coleman, Rolita White, Susan Weems, Charlene "Tweet" Keys, Baazar Boogieman Royale, and producer Timothy "Timbaland" Mosley, who became his main collaborators through the 1990s. After Swing Mob folded, they continued working together on different projects, one of which was Ginuwine's 1996 debut album, titled Ginuwine...the Bachelor. The first single, "Pony", peaked at number 6 on the Billboard Hot 100.

His second album, 100% Ginuwine, was released in 1999 and featured the hit single "So Anxious". After 100% Ginuwine, Ginuwine and Timbaland grew apart. Producers such as R. Kelly and Troy Oliver have crafted hits for him since then. In 2001, Ginuwine had a number-four hit on the Billboard Hot 100 with the single "Differences", which also peaked at number one on the Billboard Hot R&B/Hip-Hop Songs chart.

Within a year, Ginuwine lost both of his parents. He later wrote and recorded a song that is featured on his third album, The Life, entitled "Two Reasons I Cry". In 2002, he was a featured artist on P. Diddy's number-one hit "I Need a Girl (Part II)". Later that year, Ginuwine started his own label, Bag Entertainment. Ginuwine's third album, The Senior, was released in 2003. It featured the hit singles "Stingy", "Hell Yeah" and "In Those Jeans".

Ginuwine's fifth album, Back II Da Basics, was released on November 15, 2005. The album debuted at number 12 on the Billboard 200, selling close to 100,000 copies. Ginuwine stated on BET's Top 100 countdown that the album went Gold with sales of 500,000 copies.

In May 2007, an album entitled I Apologize was released in stores. Although attributed to Ginuwine, the release was an unauthorized album and included only three Ginuwine songs – apparently from stolen masters – and ten songs by other artists. Ginuwine spoke against the unofficial release on both his Myspace page and through YouTube. In 2007, Ginuwine collaborated with Canadian hip-hop artist Belly in the latter's debut solo song "Pressure", which was featured in Belly's debut album the Revolution, released in June 2007.

Ginuwine's sixth album, entitled A Man's Thoughts, was released on June 23, 2009. The album was produced by The Underdogs, B Cox, Timbaland, The Runners, Johnta Austin, Oak and Polow Da Don. The album includes guests appearances from Brandy, Missy Elliott, Bun B and Timbaland. Ginuwine formed a group with Tank and Tyrese named TGT. Their first single was a remix of Tank's "Please Don't Go". They were supposed to tour but plans fell apart due to conflicting schedules.

Ginuwine announced on his Myspace blog on August 21, 2008, that due to label and legal issues, they will not be able to release an official TGT album. Ginuwine is the founder and CEO of LoveSong Incorporated, after completing his contract with 550 Music/Epic. Ginuwine announced on his Myspace blog on August 21, 2008, that he signed a major label deal with Notifi Records/Warner Brothers.

Ginuwine introduced producer MELROG and rapper Young Knight a.k.a. Knightron on the Back 2 Da Basics album. Currently Knightron is working on his own album under Ginuwine's label BAG ENT. Ginuwine's seventh studio album, Elgin, was released on Valentine's Day in 2011.

In 2014 Ginuwine was working on a studio album called Same Ol' G...the Bachelor and confirmed that Timbaland and Missy Elliott were executive producing the project. The album was never released.

In 2021, the duo Altégo posted a snippet of a mashup of "Pony" and Britney Spears's "Toxic" on TikTok, that quickly went viral. In January 2022, the mashup was completed and officially released through Sony Music Entertainment under the title "Toxic Pony", being credited to Altégo, Spears and Ginuwine. The mashup reached number 40 on the Billboard Pop Airplay chart.

==== TGT ====
In 2007, Ginuwine, Tyrese, and Tank formed an R&B group called TGT and were signed to Atlantic Records in 2012. Their Grammy-nominated debut album Three Kings was released in 2013. The first single of the album "Sex Never Felt Better" was released on iTunes on February 14, 2013, for Valentine's Day.

On July 6, 2026, Ginuwine appeared in a Missy Elliott-curated Aaliyah tribute, speaking via a video montage, for the finale at that year's Essence Festival of Culture.

=== Film ===
Ginuwine was originally cast in the 2004 film You Got Served. Ultimately R&B artist Marques Houston was cast in his place. The writer of the movie kept Ginuwine's real name "Elgin" as the name for one of the lead characters. He also was cast as R&B singer "Romeo" in the film Juwanna Mann. He also appeared in three episodes of Moesha as Khalib, called "All This and Turkey, Too", "You Say He's Just A Friend", and "On the Rebound"

Ginuwine appeared on Half & Half as R.J. Jackson in the episode "The Big Don't Go Chasing Waterfalls Episode" that aired in 2004.

In February 2011, Ginuwine co-starred in the Gospel Music Channel's debut of John Ruffin's stage play The Ideal Husband, which also stars Darrin Dewitt Henson, Jackée Harry, Clifton Powell, Shirley Murdock, Shanti Lowry and Erica Hubbard.

=== Endorsements ===
Ginuwine is a spokesman for the beverage Adult Chocolate Milk, a 40-proof vodka-based version of chocolate milk.

=== Television ===
Ginuwine appeared in the CBS show Martial Law starring Sammo Hung and Arsenio Hall. In the episode "How Sammo Got His Groove Back" airing November 21, 1998, Ginuwine plays Hall's nephew, Zeke Meadows, a singer who is a target for murder by a ruthless CD bootlegger.

Ginuwine appeared on the UPN television sitcom Half & Half where he played R.J. Jackson, the friend of Spencer's (Chico Benymon) which aired in November 2004.

In the NBC series Parks and Recreation, character Donna Meagle is Ginuwine's cousin. He appeared on the show as himself twice: the season six finale "Moving Up," (performing at the Unity Concert) and the seventh-season episode "Donna & Joe."

On January 5, 2018, Ginuwine entered the UK reality show Celebrity Big Brother 21. He was evicted on January 23, 2018, and came in 11th place.

In 2023, Ginuwine competed in season ten of The Masked Singer as "Husky". He was eliminated in "I Wanna Rock" alongside Sebastian Bach as "Tiki".

== Personal life ==
Both of Ginuwine's parents died; his father by suicide, and his mother from cancer less than a year later. He suffered grief and depression; he also thought of killing himself. He received counseling from his pastor, which turned him to a more positive path. He recorded the song "Two Reasons I Cry" about the death of his parents on his 2001 album The Life.

Ginuwine was married to the rapper Tonya M. Johnston, better known by her stage name Solé. Ginuwine met Solé in June 1999 and they began dating in October 1999. They were married on September 8, 2003, in the Cayman Islands. They lived in Maryland. They have two daughters together: Story (b. March 29, 2001) and Dream Sarae Lumpkin (b. November 1, 2002). He has a son, Elgin Jr. (b. January 30, 1991), from a previous relationship, as well as four other children with three different women. In February 2009, Ginuwine announced he has seven children: Ramonda, Tiffany, Elgin, Ginel, Tahjair, Story and Dream, plus two step-children through his now-ex-wife Sole: Dejan and Cypress. In November 2014, he announced he and Solé had separated. Their divorce was finalized July 22, 2015.

In the 2023 memoir The Woman in Me, Britney Spears stated that Justin Timberlake had acted inappropriately and put on a blaccent when meeting Ginuwine. However, in December 2023, Ginuwine stated: "I can tell you I don't remember that happening. I truly don't remember that happening [...] If Justin would've did something like that, I probably would've looked at him like, 'Why are you acting like that?' If he did that, that would be something that I would remember. That would've definitely stuck out."

== Public image and artistry ==
Ginuwine's musical style blends traditional R&B with elements of hip-hop and soul. His early collaborations with producer Timbaland, particularly on his debut album Ginuwine... the Bachelor (1996), introduced a fresh sound characterized by unconventional beats and sensual themes. Subsequent albums like 100% Ginuwine (1999) and The Life (2001) continued to explore themes of love, intimacy, and personal growth, with hits such as "So Anxious" and "Differences" solidifying his reputation as a leading R&B artist. Critics have noted his ability to convey vulnerability and emotion, distinguishing his work in the genre.

He also has cultivated an image as a suave and romantic artist, earning him the nickname "Ladies' Man" in the R&B world. He also has been considered a sex symbol in the media.

== Discography ==
Studio albums

- Ginuwine... the Bachelor (1996)
- 100% Ginuwine (1999)
- The Life (2001)
- The Senior (2003)
- Back II da Basics (2005)
- A Man's Thoughts (2009)
- Elgin (2011)
- A Ginuwine Christmas (2011)

Collaborative albums

- Three Kings (with Tank and Tyrese, as TGT) (2013)

== Filmography ==
=== Film ===
Year	Title	Role	Notes
2002	Juwanna Mann	Romeo	
2003	Honey	Himself	
2006	Da Jammies	G (voice)	Video short
2008	Baby Dil Deewana		Short
2011	The Ideal Husband	Reggie	TV movie
2011	The Bachelor Party	Trey	Video
2014	Chocolate City	Pharaoh	
2016	Paid in Full	Brad	
2017	Chocolate City: Vegas Strip	Pharaoh	

=== Television ===
Year	Title	Role	Notes
1998	Martial Law	Zeke Meadows	Episode: "How Sammo Got His Groove Back"
2000	Moesha	Khalib	Recurring cast: season 6
2003	Platinum	Hoody Rob	Episode: "Loyalty"
2004	Half & Half	R.J. Jackson	Episode: "The Big Don't Go Chasing Waterfalls Episode"
2014–15	Parks and Recreation	Himself	Episode: "Moving Up: Part 1 & 2" & "Donna and Joe"
2018	Celebrity Big Brother	Himself/Contestant	Evicted 5th; made 11th place
2018	Your Husband Is Cheating on Us	Himself	Main cast
2023	The Masked Singer	Himself/Husky	Season 10 contestant

== Awards and nominations ==
- Grammy Awards
  - 2014, Best R&B Album: "Three Kings" (Nominated)
- BET Awards
  - 2003: Best Male R&B Artist, Nominated
- American Music Awards
  - 2003: Favorite Male R&B Artist, Nominated
  - 2002: Favorite Male R&B Artist, Nominated
  - 2000: Favorite Male R&B Artist, Nominated
- Billboard Music Awards
  - 2002: Top Rap Song ("I Need a Girl (Part Two)"), Nominated
- Blockbuster Entertainment Awards
  - 2000: Favorite Male Artist - R&B, Nominated
- iHeartRadio MMVAs
  - 2007: Video of the Year ("Pressure" (with Belly)), Nominated
  - 2007: Director of the Year ("Pressure" (with Belly)), Nominated
  - 2007: Best Cinematography ("Pressure" (with Belly)), Nominated
  - 2007: MuchVibe Best Rap Video ("Pressure" (with Belly)), Winners
- MTV Europe Music Awards
  - 1997: Best R&B, Nominated
- Soul Train Music Awards
  - 2000: Best R&B/Soul Male Single ("So Anxious"), Nominated
  - 2000: Best R&B/Soul Male Album (100% Ginuwine), Winner
- Teen Choice Awards
  - 1999: Choice Male Artist, Nominated
  - 1999: Choice Love Song ("So Anxious"), Nominated
