= Come Back in One Piece =

2000 single by Aaliyah featuring DMX

Single by Aaliyah featuring DMX

from the album Romeo Must Die: The Album
- A-side: "I Don't Wanna"
- Released: June 6, 2000
- Recorded: Fall 1999
- Genre: R&B; funk; hip-hop
- Length: 4:20
- Label: Blackground; Virgin
- Songwriters: Stephen Garrett; Earl Simmons; Irving Lorenzo; Rob Meys; George Clinton; Bernie Worrell; William Collins
- Producers: Irv Gotti; Lil Rob

Aaliyah singles chronology
"Try Again" (2000)	"Come Back in One Piece" (2000)	"We Need a Resolution" (2001)

DMX singles chronology
"Don't You Ever" (2000)	"Come Back in One Piece" (2000)	"No Sunshine" (2001)

Music video
- "Come Back in One Piece" on YouTube

"Come Back in One Piece" is a song recorded by American singer Aaliyah, featuring a guest appearance by American rapper DMX, for the soundtrack to the 2000 film Romeo Must Die. It was written by DMX, Stephen Garrett, Irv Gotti, Rob Meys, George Clinton, Bernie Worrell and William Collins, while the production was handled by Gotti and Lil Rob. The song was released as the second single from Romeo Must Die on June 6, 2000, by Blackground Records and Virgin Records.

Upon its release, "Come Back in One Piece" received generally favorable reviews from music critics, with many critics praising the chemistry between Aaliyah and DMX. However, it failed to enter the US Billboard Hot 100, peaking at number 17 on its extension chart Bubbling Under Hot 100 Singles. Internationally, the song was released as a double A-side single with "I Don't Wanna". The accompanying music video for "Come Back in One Piece" was directed by Little X in DMX's hometown of Yonkers as well as Mt. Vernon and featured an "authentic" street theme, mixed with scenes from Romeo Must Die.

== Background ==
In 1999, Aaliyah landed her first film role in Romeo Must Die (2000), a loose adaptation of William Shakespeare's Romeo and Juliet. Aaliyah starred opposite martial artist Jet Li, playing a couple who fall in love amid their warring families. It grossed US$18.6 million in its first weekend, reaching number two at the box office. In addition to acting, Aaliyah served as an executive producer of the film soundtrack, to which she contributed four songs, including "Come Back in One Piece". Aaliyah revealed that the production team "actually talked about the soundtrack before we even shot the movie".

In a 2011 interview with Billboard, DMX stated that Aaliyah and Romeo Must Die's producer Joel Silver personally asked him to be a part of the film, stating: "When I was on tour, her and Joel Silver came to my dressing room to see if I wanted to be a part of the movie", adding: "Most people would have their people call, but she came herself. I'm like, 'Is this a trick question? You have to ask me if I want to be in a movie with Aaliyah? Hell yeah.' We [then] met up in Vancouver to [do] Romeo Must Die."

== Music and lyrics ==
Musically, "Come Back in One Piece" is an "effective blend of R&B and Hip hop". In their book Listen to Hip Hop!: Exploring a Musical Genre (2021), authors Anthony J. Fonesca and Melissa Ursula Dawn Goldsmith described the song as a "funk infused hip-hop love song". Billboard explained that, the song, "has a definite funk feel, complete with wailing bass kicks". While, MTV.com stated a similar sentiment saying the record has a "propulsive funk backing track". Production wise it incorporates a sample from the song "Sir Nose D'Voidoffunk" by Parliament, from their album Funkentelechy vs. the Placebo Syndrome (1977). It also uses "repetitive harmonic motion to reaffirm the home key by starting on G major and resolving to F-sharp major (or II-I in F-sharp major). On the record, Aaliyah's vocals "are not multi-tracked or processed much but rather kept thin and dry, which gives the overall impression that she is girlish". She is sometimes backed by harmonizing female vocalists and her verse "prefigures the refrain melody".

Chuck Taylor from Billboard, noted that on the song Aaliyah is "playing the role of the concerned girlfriend who worries about the actions of her lover, but she understands what he has to do". While, analyzing the lyrics, Quentin B. Huff from PopMatters mentioned: "In "Back in One Piece", Aaliyah's role is the devoted worrier. She's afraid for her man's safety when he goes out at night. "I barely sleep," she sings, almost breathless. Wishing he would just call her to let her know he's not "in some heat", Aaliyah's verse and refrain are pleas that he'll check in with her and "make it back in one piece." Huff also stated, "They are also prayers, I think, because she knows he won't check in and any promises he makes to come home safely are far from guarantees. DMX's rap is short on reassurances. With lines like, "Let me go, I'll be back, I ain't got time to convince", he sounds as if he's in too much of a rush to console her".

== Release and promotion ==
"Come Back in One Piece" was serviced to rhythmic contemporary and urban contemporary radio stations in the United States on June 6, 2000, by Blackground Records and Virgin Records. It was later released internationally as a double A-side single with "I Don't Wanna". To promote Romeo Must Die, Aaliyah and DMX performed "Come Back in One Piece" together on Romeo Must Die: The Kickoff Special, which aired on MTV in March 2000. Rap-Up ranked her kickoff special performance as one of her 10 greatest live performances saying, "Who knew that the 2000 film was so anticipated it warranted a kickoff special? That’s just the kind of effect Aaliyah had on people. This was confirmed in her ability to make DMX crack a smile and momentarily turn from street to sweet, which is pretty much what Aaliyah was always the perfect combination of."

In August 2021, it was reported that Aaliyah's recorded work for Blackground (since rebranded as Blackground Records 2.0) would be re-released on physical, digital, and, for the first time ever, streaming services in a deal between the label and Empire Distribution. Romeo Must Die: The Album, including "Come Back in One Piece", was re-released on September 3.

== Critical reception ==
Derrick Mathis from AllMusic felt that DMX "takes control of things in his duet with Aaliyah on Come Back in One Piece." In his review of "Come Back in One Piece", Chuck Taylor from Billboard stated: "Although the two stars couldn't be any more opposite – Aaliyah with her velvet tones and smooth moves, and DMX, who is known for his gruff, grimy flow – the contrast works in conveying the theme of the song". BET stated that the song "shows that Aaliyah was an "around the way girl," just as comfortable in the 'hood with the toughest of rappers as she was gracing lavish red carpets".

In 2016, Complex compiled a list of Aaliyah's best songs and included "Come Back in One Piece". Writer Jacob Moore stated: "What made the song work so well wasn’t just DMX using dog metaphors to proclaim loyalty for his girl—it was Aaliyah meeting him somewhere in the middle", adding: "When she sang "Come Back in One Piece," she did it like she really understood that all things, even DMX, are more complicated than they seem".

Bianca Gracie from Fuse felt that the song's sample of Parliament's "Sir Nose D'Voidoffunk" balanced out DMX's "thuggish flow" with Aaliyah's "honey-sweet melody" While reviewing Romeo Must Die: The Album, The Ledger felt that Aaliyah "gets bonus points for taming a usually barking (now charmingly hoarse) DMX on the near-romantic Come Back in One Piece". Christopher O'Conner from MTV News said that Aaliyah, "takes a hardcore Irv Gotti beat tailored for DMX (he opens the song with a guest verse) and drives it without a hitch". Quentin B. Huff from PopMatters praised the song by saying: "I like that the song doesn't try to wrap things up neatly with a meeting of the minds. Instead, both sides are entrenched in their positions, forcing them to agree to disagree. I suspect the two personalities in this song would argue a lot, and there's quite a bit of realism in that". Mya Singleton from YardBarker stated, "DMX's signature bark and grit were perfect alongside Aaliyah's smooth vocal tone".

== Music video ==
=== Background ===
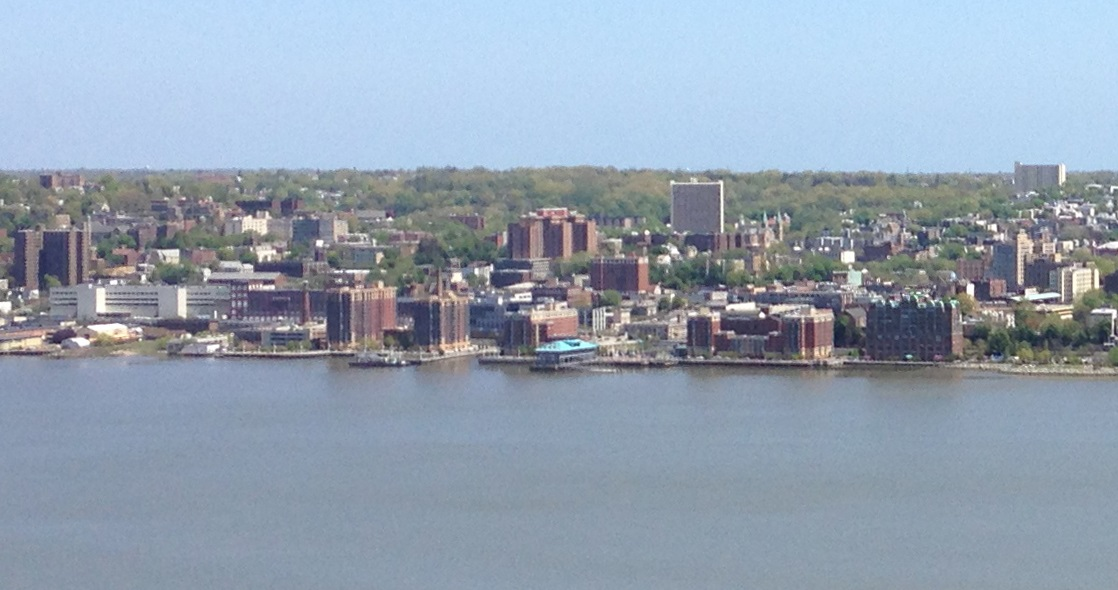
One of the videos filming locations took place in DMX's Hometown Yonkers.

The accompanying music video for "Come Back in One Piece" was directed by Little X. It was filmed in March 2000 in Yonkers, DMX's hometown, and Mount Vernon, New York. While speaking with MTV about the video's theme, Little X stated: "I'm just trying to shoot DMX's hood, an area that he's from, because when you do a street joint, it has to be authentic". In a 2011 interview with Billboard, DMX discussed filming the video with Aaliyah, stating: "We did the video in Mount Vernon and Yonkers. I got to bring Aaliyah to the hood. Not many people can say that".

According to MTV News, during the video shoot security guards restrained "Mount Vernon junior and senior high school girls as they yelled, I love ya DMX!". A few fans shared their experience from being at the video shoot with MTV. After getting his autograph, one fan recalled, "DMX is the realest rapper out there, "I'm so glad I got to see him in my neighborhood. Most rappers wouldn't come here to shoot a video in front of their fans like that. I just love him." Another fan, "who wore a Ruff Ryders bandana around his head" stated, "I'm so amped that they shot the video down the street from my house, That's what makes the dog [DMX] so real."

=== Fashion ===
For the music video, Aaliyah wore a variety of different looks including a Python print outfit, Roberto Cavalli jeans, and a sweatsuit. While speaking about the Python print outfit, Aaliyah's former stylist Derek Lee stated "it was pricey". Lee continued speaking on the outfit saying, "I can’t remember the Black designer who made it but I told him what I needed and he made it". The embellished Roberto Cavalli jeans were purchased by Lee just one day before the video shoot. In the video Aaliyah wanted to look "Hood", says lee. "She was like, I’m with DMX, we are in the Bronx, I need to look like I belong.” The sweatsuit is my favorite honestly. It was a very New York thing to wear jeans underneath the sweatsuit. She is wearing jeans, but she has a name belt. And the whole point of wearing the jeans is so she can wear her name belt and have the sweats swag. So she has on jeans with a name belt that's unbuckled slightly to give that I don't give a f kind of attitude. And then she has the baggy sweatpants over the jeans with Timbs. That's classic New York Bronx style".

=== Synopsis and reception ===
The video begins with a clip from Romeo Must Die on a small television screen, which then leads to the opening shot of the video with Aaliyah and DMX standing in front of a brick wall. In the next scene, DMX and his crew of friends get into a street fight in front of a liquor store. The video follows with Aaliyah singing in various locations, such as a dingy hallway and outside with DMX. Aaliyah is also shown walking and hanging out with a group of thugs while carrying her dog. She is also shown with her friends, getting into a street fight with a group of girls similar to DMX's street fight scene, as well as playing with her dog as she is lying in bed. During the final scene of the video, various residents from DMX's old neighborhood are taking pictures in front of murals of Aaliyah and DMX. The video ends with another scene from Romeo Must Die.

The music video for "Come Back in One Piece" made its television debut on BET during the week ending April 17, 2000. During the week ending May 1, the video became the 15th most-played video on BET. It debuted on The Box during the week of May 13. During the week ending June 26, the video became the 27th most-played on MTV.

== Track listings and formats ==
- European maxi CD single
1. "Come Back in One Piece" (album version) (featuring DMX) – 4:18
2. "Come Back in One Piece" (instrumental) (featuring DMX) – 4:18
3. "Come Back in One Piece" (music video) – 3:36
- UK maxi CD single
1. "I Don't Wanna" – 4:14
2. "Come Back in One Piece" (solo version) – 3:41
3. "Come Back in One Piece" (album version) (featuring DMX) – 4:18
4. "Come Back in One Piece" (music video) – 3:36

== Charts ==
Weekly chart performance for "Come Back in One Piece"
Chart (2000)	Peak position
Netherlands (Dutch Top 40 Tipparade)	4
Netherlands (Single Top 100)	59
US Bubbling Under Hot 100 (Billboard)	17
US Hot R&B/Hip-Hop Songs (Billboard)	36
US Rap Airplay (Billboard)	11
US Rhythmic Airplay (Billboard)	39

== Release history ==
Release dates and formats for "Come Back in One Piece"
Region	Date	Format(s)	Label(s)	Ref.
United States	June 6, 2000	Rhythmic contemporary radio; urban contemporary radio	Blackground; Virgin	
Germany	October 30, 2000	Maxi CD	EMI	

== Bibliography ==
- Farley, Christopher John (2002). Aaliyah: More Than a Woman. Simon & Schuster. ISBN 0-7434-5566-5.
- Fonseca, Anthony J.; Goldsmith, Melissa Ursula Dawn (2021). Listen to Hip Hop!: Exploring a Musical Genre. Bloomsbury Publishing. ISBN 9781440874888.
