= List of awards and nominations received by Aaliyah =

List of Aaliyah awards and nominations
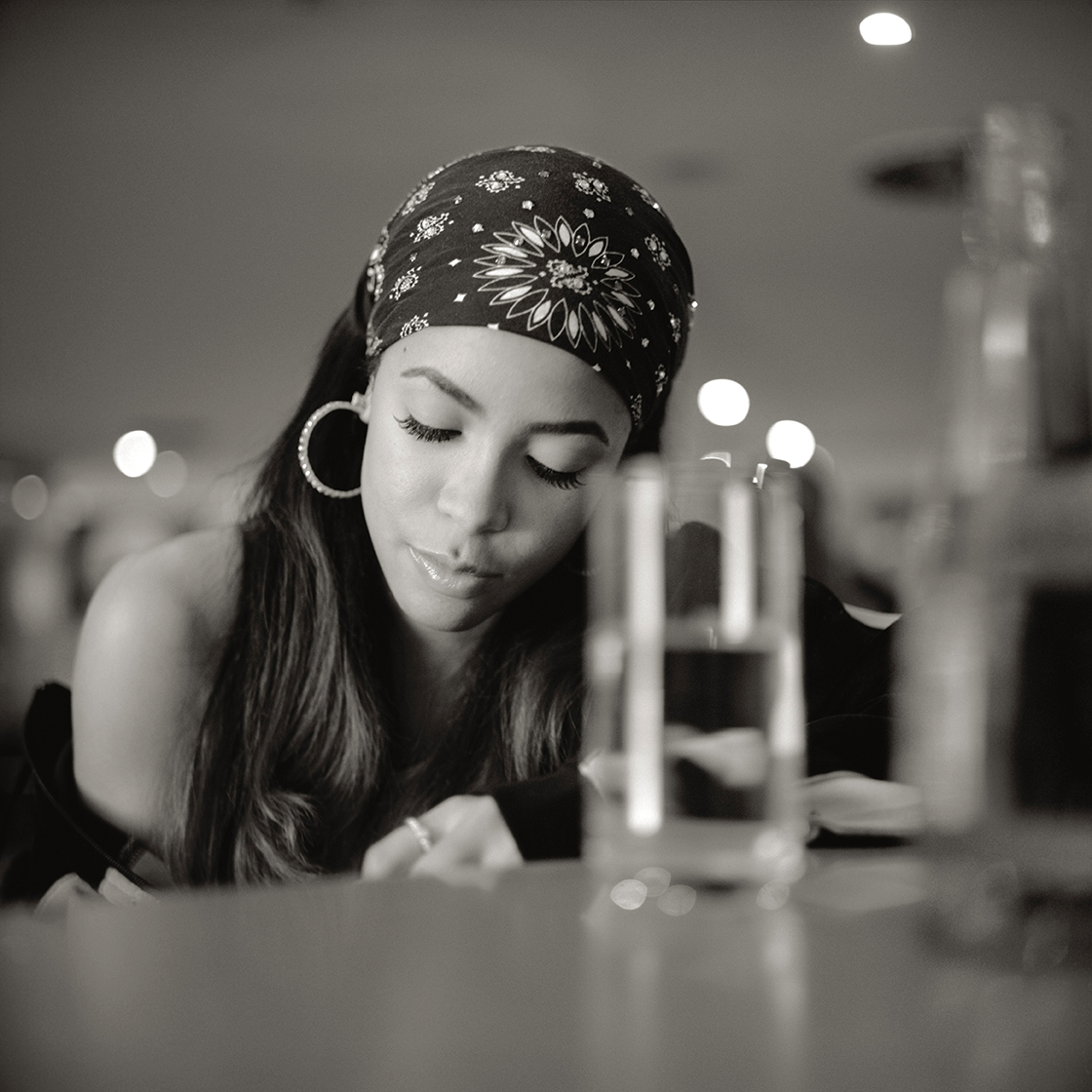
- Aaliyah in 2000
Awards and nominations
Award	Wins	Nominations
American Music Awards	3	5
BET	0	6
Billboard	0	8
Grammy	0	5
MOBO	1	1
MTV VMA	2	7
Soul Train	1	7

Totals (Note: Certain award groups do not simply award one winner. They acknowledge several different recipients, have runners-up, and have third place. Since this is a specific recognition and is different from losing an award, runner-up mentions are considered wins in this award tally. For simplification and to avoid errors, each award in this list has been presumed to have had a prior nomination.)
- Wins: 22
- Nominations: 74

Aaliyah Dana Haughton, (January 16, 1979 – August 25, 2001) was an American singer and actress. She is widely recognized for her contributions to music and received credit for helping redefine contemporary R&B, pop, and hip-hop in the 1990s, thus earning the Honorific nicknames of "Princess of R&B" and "Queen of Urban Pop".

During her musical career, Aaliyah has won three American Music Awards, two MTV Video Music Awards , two Soul Train Lady of Soul Awards and a Soul Train Music Award. Aside from her career winnings, she has also received five Grammy Award nominations. In 2021 she was inducted into the Michigan Rock and Roll Legends Hall of Fame. In September 2023, Aaliyah was inducted into the National Rhythm & Blues Hall of Fame.

Although music is her primary source of accomplishment, she has received several nominations for her work in film. Her film-based nominations include 4 MTV Movie Awards noms across various film categories and two BET Awards noms in the Best Actress category. In 2003, she received a nomination for Best Actress for her role in Queen of the Damned at the Fangoria Chainsaw Awards.

== American Music Awards ==
Year	Nominee / work	Award	Result	Ref.
1995	Aaliyah	Favorite Soul/R&B New Artist	Nominated	
1999	Aaliyah	Favorite Soul/R&B Female Artist	Nominated	
2002	Aaliyah	Favorite Soul/R&B Female Artist	Won	
2002	Aaliyah	Favorite Soul/R&B Album	Won	
2003 (November)	Aaliyah	Favorite Soul/R&B Female Artist	Won	

== ARTISTdirect Online Music Awards ==
Year	Nominee / work	Award	Result	Ref.
2000	Aaliyah	Favorite Urban/Hip-Hop Female Artist	Won	

== BDS Certified Spin Awards ==
Year	Nominee / work	Award	Result	Ref.
2002	"More Than a Woman"	100,000 Spins	Won	
2004	"I Care 4 U"	100,000 Spins	Won	
2005	"We Need a Resolution"	50,000 Spins	Won	
2006	"Rock the Boat"	200,000 Spins	Won	
2007	"Miss You"	300,000 Spins	Won	

== BET Awards ==
Year	Nominee / work	Award	Result	Ref.
2001	"Romeo Must Die"	Best Actress	Nominated	
2001	Aaliyah	Best Female R&B Artist	Nominated	
2002	"Queen of the Damned"	Best Actress	Nominated	
2002	Aaliyah	Best Female R&B Artist	Nominated	
2002	"Rock the Boat"	Video of the Year	Nominated	
2002	"Rock the Boat"	Viewer's Choice	Nominated	

== Billboard Music Awards ==
Year	Nominee / work	Award	Result	Ref.
2000	Aaliyah	Female R&B/Hip-Hop Artist of the Year	Nominated	
2002	Aaliyah	Female R&B/Hip-Hop Artist of the Year	Nominated	
2003	Aaliyah	R&B/Hip-Hop Artist of the Year	Nominated	
2003	Aaliyah	Hot 100 Female Artist of the Year	Nominated	

== Billboard Music Video Awards ==
Year	Nominee / work	Award	Result	Ref.
1994	"Back & Forth"	Best New R&B/Urban Artist Clip of the Year	Nominated	
2000	"Try Again"	Maximum Vision Video	Nominated	
2000	"Try Again"	Best R&B Clip	Nominated	

== Billboard R&B/Hip-Hop Awards ==
Year	Nominee / work	Award	Result	Ref.
2002	Aaliyah	Top R&B/Hip-Hop Artist	Nominated	
2002	Aaliyah	Top R&B/Hip-Hop Artist, Female	Nominated	
2002	Aaliyah	Top R&B/Hip-Hop Singles Artist	Nominated	
2002	"Rock The Boat"	Top R&B/Hip-Hop Single	Nominated	
2002	"Rock The Boat"	Top R&B/Hip-Hop Single - Airplay	Nominated	
2003	Aaliyah	Top R&B/Hip-Hop Artist	Nominated	
2003	Aaliyah	Top R&B/Hip-Hop Artist, Female	Won	
2003	Aaliyah	Top R&B/Hip-Hop Singles Artist	Nominated	
2003	"Miss You"	Top R&B/Hip-Hop Single - Airplay	Nominated	

== Billboard Year-End List ==
Year	Nominee / work	Award	Result	Ref.
1994	Aaliyah	Top New R&B Artists	2nd Place	
1994	Aaliyah	Top R&B Artists – Female	4th Place	
2000	Aaliyah	Top R&B/Hip-Hop Artists – Female	4th place	
2002	Aaliyah	Top R&B/Hip Hop Artists – Female	2nd Place	
2002	Aaliyah	R&B/Hip-Hop Singles & Tracks Artist	4th Place	

== Blockbuster Entertainment Awards ==
Year	Nominee / work	Award	Result	Ref.
1995	Aaliyah	Favorite New Artist - Female	Nominated	
1997	"One In A Million"	Favorite Female Artist - R&B	Nominated	

== CosmoGIRL! of the Year Awards ==
Year	Nominee / work	Award	Result	Ref.
2000	Aaliyah	CosmoGirl of the Year	Nominated	

== Echo ==
Year	Nominee / work	Award	Result	Ref.
2003	Aaliyah	Best Hip-Hop/R&B International	Nominated	

== Fangoria Chainsaw Awards ==
Year	Nominee / work	Award	Result	Ref.
2003	"Queen of the Damned"	Best Actress	Nominated	

== Grammy Awards ==
Year	Nominee / work	Award	Result	Ref.
1999	"Are You That Somebody?"	Best Female R&B Vocal Performance	Nominated	
2001	"Try Again"	Best Female R&B Vocal Performance	Nominated	
2002	Aaliyah	Best R&B Album	Nominated	
2002	"Rock the Boat"	Best Female R&B Vocal Performance	Nominated	
2003	"More Than a Woman"	Best Female R&B Vocal Performance	Nominated	

== Groovevolt Music & Fashion Awards ==
Year	Nominee / work	Award	Result	Ref.
2004	"Miss You"	Best Song Performance - Female	Nominated	

== Hollywood Black Film Festival ==
Year	Nominee / work	Award	Result	Ref.
2002	Aaliyah	Inspirational Spirit Award	Won	

== MOBO Awards ==
Year	Nominee / work	Award	Result	Ref.
2002	"More Than a Woman"	Best Video	Won	

== Michigan Rock & Roll Legends Hall of Fame ==
Year	Nominee / work	Award	Result	Ref.
2021	Aaliyah	Michigan Rock & Roll Legends Hall of Fame	Inducted	

== MTV Europe Music Awards ==
Year	Nominee / work	Award	Result	Ref.
2000	Aaliyah	Best R&B	Nominated	

== MTV Movie Awards ==
Year	Nominee / work	Award	Result	Ref.
1999	"Are You That Somebody?"	Best Song from a Movie	Nominated	
2001	"Romeo Must Die"	Best Female Performance	Nominated	
2001	"Romeo Must Die"	Best Breakthrough Female Performance	Nominated	
2002	"Queen of the Damned"	Best Villain	Nominated	

== MTV Video Music Awards ==
Year	Nominee / work	Award	Result	Ref.
1999	"Are You That Somebody?"	Best R&B Video	Nominated	
1999	"Are You That Somebody?"	Best Video from a Film	Nominated	
2000	"Try Again"	Best Female Video	Won	
2000	"Try Again"	Best Video From a Film	Won	
2000	"Try Again"	Best Choreography	Nominated	
2002	"Rock the Boat"	Best R&B Video	Nominated	
2003	"Miss You"	Best R&B Video	Nominated	

== My VH1 Music Awards ==
Year	Nominee / work	Award	Result	Ref.
2000	Aaliyah	Double Threat (Musician/Actors)	Nominated	
2001	Aaliyah	My Favorite Female	Nominated	

== NAACP Image Awards ==
Year	Nominee / work	Award	Result	Ref.
1999	"Are You That Somebody?"	Outstanding Music Video	Nominated	
2001	"Try Again"	Outstanding Music Video	Nominated	
2002	Aaliyah	Outstanding Album	Nominated	
2002	Aaliyah	Outstanding Female Artist	Won	
2002	"Rock the Boat"	Outstanding Music Video	Nominated	

== Nickelodeon Kids Choice Awards ==
Year	Nominee / work	Award	Result	Ref.
1999	"Are You That Somebody?"	Favorite Song	Nominated	
1999	Aaliyah	Favorite Singer	Nominated	

== NME Awards ==
Year	Nominee / work	Award	Result	Ref.
2002	Aaliyah	Best R&B/ Soul Act	Won	

== Prestige Awards ==
Year	Nominee / work	Award	Result	Ref.
2002	Aaliyah	Entertainer of the Year	Won	

== Rhythm & Blues Hall of Fame ==
Year	Nominee / work	Award	Result	Ref.
2023	Aaliyah	Rhythm & Blues Hall of Fame	Inducted	

== Soul Train Music Awards ==
Year	Nominee / work	Award	Result	Ref.
1995	Aaliyah	Best R&B/Soul or Rap New Artist	Nominated	
1995	Age Ain't Nothing but a Number	Best R&B/Soul Album, Female	Nominated	
1997	One in a Million	Best R&B/Soul Album, Female	Nominated	
1998	"One in a Million"	Best R&B/Soul Single, Female	Nominated	
2002	Aaliyah	Best R&B/Soul Album, Female	Nominated	
2002	Aaliyah	Best R&B/Soul or Rap Album of the Year	Nominated	
2002	"Rock the Boat"	Best R&B/Soul Single, Female	Won	

== Soul Train Lady of Soul Awards ==
Year	Nominee / work	Award	Result	Ref.
1995	"Back & Forth"	Best R&B/Soul New Artist	Nominated	
1999	"Are You That Somebody?"	Best R&B/Soul Song of The Year	Nominated	
1999	"Are You That Somebody?"	Best R&B/Soul or Rap Music Video	Nominated	
2000	"Try Again"	Best R&B/Soul Single - Solo	Nominated	
2000	"Try Again"	Best R&B/Soul or Rap Music Video	Nominated	
2001	"Try Again"	Best R&B/Soul or Rap Song of the Year	Nominated	
2002	Aaliyah	Best R&B/Soul Album of the Year	Nominated	
2002	"Rock the Boat"	Best R&B/Soul Single- Solo	Won	
2002	"Rock the Boat"	Best R&B/Soul or Rap Song of the Year	Won	
2002	"Rock the Boat"	Best R&B/Soul or Rap Music Video	Nominated	

== Source Awards ==
Year	Nominee / work	Award	Result	Ref.
2003	Aaliyah	R&B Artist of the Year, Female	Nominated	

== Stinkers Bad Movie Awards ==
Year	Nominee / work	Award	Result	Ref.
2002	"Queen of the Damned"	Worst Supporting Actress	Nominated	

== Teen Choice Awards ==
Year	Nominee / work	Award	Result	Ref.
2000	"Try Again"	Choice Summer Song	Nominated	
2001	Aaliyah	Choice Music: Female Artist	Nominated	
2001	Aaliyah	Choice Female Hottie	Nominated	
2002	"More Than A Woman"	Choice Music: R&B/Hip-Hop Track	Nominated	

== VH1 Big Awards ==
Year	Nominee / work	Award	Result	Ref.
2003	"Miss You"	Big Song of '03	Nominated	

== World Music Awards ==
Year	Nominee / work	Award	Result
2001	Aaliyah	World's Best Selling R&B Artist	Nominated

== Young Hollywood Hall of Fame ==
Year	Nominee / work	Award	Result	Ref.
1999	Herself	Young Hollywood Hall of Fame – Musical Artist	Inducted	
