= I Don't Wanna (Aaliyah song) =

Single by Aaliyah

from the album Next Friday and Romeo Must Die: The Album
- Released: January 11, 2000
- Recorded: 1999
- Genre: R&B
- Length: 4:15
- Label: Blackground; Priority; Virgin
- Songwriters: Johntá Austin; Jazze Pha; Donnie Scantz; Kevin Hicks
- Producers: Scantz; Hicks

Aaliyah singles chronology
"Are You That Somebody?" (1998)	"I Don't Wanna" (2000)	"Try Again" (2000)

Visualizer video
- "I Don't Wanna" on YouTube

"I Don't Wanna" is a song recorded by American singer Aaliyah. Written and composed by Johntá Austin, Jazze Pha, Donnie Scantz, and Kevin Hicks, it appears on both the Next Friday (1999) and Romeo Must Die (2000) soundtracks.

The song was released in January 2000 as an airplay-only single in the United States, where it reached number 35 on the Billboard Hot 100 and number five on the Hot R&B/Hip-Hop Songs. Internationally, "I Don't Wanna" was released as a double A-side with "Come Back in One Piece".

== Background ==
"I Don't Wanna" was written and composed by Jazze Pha, Johntá Austin, Donnie Scantz and Kevin Hicks, with the latter producing the song. Austin wrote the song's first verse, while Pha wrote the second verse. In her biography Baby Girl: Better Known as Aaliyah (2021), author-journalist Kathy Iandoli explained that "when the opportunity to work with Aaliyah presented itself, a company called Noontime Music jumped into the race and met with Blackground in New York." During the meeting, Noontime Music associates presented several songs to the label, including "Miss You" and "I Don't Wanna", which Scantz put together "before the NYC Trip". Out of all of the songs presented to the executives from Blackground, "I Don't Wanna" was the one they loved the most. Scantz who was in Atlanta at the time of the meeting recalled "Nobody knew who did the track" but nonetheless he got a call saying they loved the track. However, Aaliyah herself loved "Miss You" and wanted to record that song instead. Austin's Manager made a deal with her and convinced her to record "I Don't Wanna" as well. According to Austin, "My manager at the time was like, ‘You have to cut ‘I Don’t Wanna’ to get (‘Miss You’)".

== Release and promotion ==
"I Don't Wanna" was released as the fourth single from Next Friday by Blackground Records and Priority Records. It was serviced to rhythmic contemporary and urban contemporary radio stations in the United States in January 2000. The song was later released as a double A-side single with "Come Back in One Piece" as the second single from Romeo Must Die by Virgin Records. While speaking with Billboard Blackground Records VP Jomo Hankerson mentioned that "I Don't Wanna" was cross-promoted on two movie soundtracks intentionally. He stated, "The intent was to have it as a setup record for Aaliyah, and it is working for everyone". To promote Romeo Must Die, Aaliyah performed "I Don't Wanna" on the April 26, 2000 episode of Total Request Live. She also performed the song on Romeo Must Die: The Kickoff Special, which aired on MTV in March 2000.

In August 2021, it was reported that Aaliyah's recorded work for Blackground (since rebranded as Blackground Records 2.0) would be re-released on physical, digital, and, for the first time, streaming services in a deal between the label and Empire Distribution. Romeo Must Die: The Album, including "I Don't Wanna", was re-released on September 3.

== Reception ==
=== Critical reception ===
Derrick Mathis from AllMusic felt that Aaliyah "pillow-talks her way through the new jack ballad as if she were snuggled in the soothing splendors of a hot bubble bath. Declaring her unwillingness to live without her man, she croons the words of the song, alternating between a breathless daddy's-girl naïveté and the throaty vibrato of a grown woman's heartache". Damien Scott from Complex felt that the song could've blended in well on Aaliyah's second studio album One in a Million (1996). According to Scott, "I Don't Wanna" was "a sullen record that would have fit perfectly on One in a Million, thanks to its somber keys, halted delivery, and abrasive honesty." He also felt that it made for a perfect song for someone going through a break-up. HotNewHipHop writer Keenan Higgins considers "I Don’t Wanna" to be Aaliyah's most overlooked song and that it fits in her discography "in a weird way". While reviewing Romeo Must Die: The Album, Christopher O'Conner from MTV News said that on "Are You Feelin' Me" and "I Don't Wanna" Aaliyah makes the tracks "sizzle". Quentin B. Huff from PopMatters praised the song, saying it showcases "an ode to rekindling love, often in a near-double time delivery", while comparing it to Usher's "Confessions Part II" (2004) and Mariah Carey's "We Belong Together" (2005). Dewayne Gage from Rolling Stone included the song in the publications playlist series, "Music at Home". Gage said the song "is a glimpse into a musical genius gone too soon".

=== Commercial performance ===
Upon its release "I Don't Wanna" didn't have "the aforementioned tools that artists typically use to help a single rise up the charts". According to Keenan Higgins from HotNewHipHop, "With no official music video to amplify the song's success and no live performances aside from a non-televised rendition on TRL and a Romeo Must Die Kickoff Special, both aired on MTV, the song should've flopped if we're being honest". Nonetheless the song debuted on the Billboard Hot 100 during the week of January 29, 2000. Six weeks after its debut, it peaked at number 35 on March 4. In total, it spent 20 consecutive weeks on the chart. It also peaked at number 5 and 22, respectively, on the Hot R&B/Hip-Hop Songs and Rhythmic charts. On the year-end Billboard Hot 100 chart, it placed at number 96. While on the Hot R&B/Hip-Hop Songs year-end chart, the song landed at number 25. Higgins attributes the songs commercial success to people rocking with it, "simply for its melodic beat and Aaliyah's rap-like flow on the first and second verses".

=== Samples and covers ===
In 2009 rapper Lil Wayne sampled "I Don't Wanna"'s entire first verse on Pleasure P's mixtape song "Rock Bottom". Singer Tory Lanez sampled the song for his Chixtape 4 mixtape (2017). In 2019 Rapper Kanye West covered the song live with a choir. Rapper Blxst sampled the record for his song "Be Alone" from his EP "No Love Lost" (2020). Kodak Black sampled the song for his song "Dirty K" from his mixtape "Haitian Boy Kodak" (2021). Singer-songwriter SZA interpolated "I Don't Wanna" in her song "Love Language" from her second studio album SOS (2022).

== Track listing ==
"I Don't Wanna"/"Come Back in One Piece"

1. "I Don't Wanna" (Album Version) – 4:14
2. "Come Back in One Piece" (Edit W/O Rap) (featuring DMX) – 3:41
3. "Come Back in One Piece" (featuring DMX) – 4:18
4. "Come Back in One Piece" (Music Video) – 3:36

== Charts ==
=== Weekly charts ===
Weekly chart performance for "I Don't Wanna"
Chart (2000)	Peak position
US Billboard Hot 100	35
US Hot R&B/Hip-Hop Songs (Billboard)	5
US Rhythmic Airplay (Billboard)	22

=== Year-end charts ===
Year-end chart performance for "I Don't Wanna"
Chart (2000)	Position
US Billboard Hot 100	96
US Hot R&B/Hip-Hop Songs (Billboard)	25
US Hot Soundtrack Singles (Billboard)	7

== Bibliography ==
- Iandoli, Kathy (2021). Baby Girl: Better Known as Aaliyah. Atria Books. ISBN 1982156864.
- Jackman, Ian (2000). Total Request Live: The Ultimate Fan Guide. Simon & Schuster. p. 131. ISBN 9780743418508.
