= Romeo Must Die (soundtrack) =

Romeo Must Die: The Album

Soundtrack album by various artists
- Released: March 14, 2000
- Recorded: 1999–2000
- Genres: Hip hop; R&B
- Length: 74:25
- Labels: Blackground; Virgin; Warner Bros.
- Producers: Timbaland; Ant Banks; B-12; D-Moet; Donnie Scantz; Eric Seats; Irv Gotti; J Dub; Joe; Joshua Thompson; Kevin Hicks; Lil' Rob; Mannie Fresh; Rapture Stewart; Stanley Clarke; Jet Li

Singles from Romeo Must Die: The Album
- 1. "Try Again" Released: March 21, 2000; 2. "Come Back in One Piece" Released: June 6, 2000; 3. "We at It Again" Released: June 20, 2000

Professional ratings
Review scores
Source	Rating
AllMusic	3/5 stars
Entertainment Weekly	A−
Mixmag	4/5 stars
Q	4/5 stars
RapReviews	3/10
Soundtrack.Net	2/5
The Village Voice	A−

Romeo Must Die: The Album is the soundtrack to Andrzej Bartkowiak's 2000 action film Romeo Must Die, composed of hip hop and R&B music. It was released on March 14, 2000 through Blackground Records and Virgin Records in association with Warner Bros. Records (who helped co-finance the soundtrack). Recording sessions took place between May 1999 and January 2000.

Production was handled by several record producers, including Irv Gotti, Rapture Stewart, Ant Banks, Eric Seats, Mannie Fresh, J Dub, and Timbaland, who also served as executive producer along with Barry and Jomo Hankerson, and the film star Aaliyah.

It features contributions from Aaliyah, who appears on four songs, as well as B.G., Chanté Moore, Dave Hollister, Destiny's Child, Ginuwine, Joe, Lil' Mo, Mack 10, Stanley Clarke, The Comrads and more.

Three singles and music videos were released from the album: Aaliyah's number one pop hit "Try Again" (directed by Wayne Isham), Aaliyah and her co-star DMX duet "Come Back in One Piece" (directed by Little X), and Timbaland & Magoo's "We At It Again" (directed by Chris Robinson), which introduced Timbaland's younger brother, rapper Sebastian, to audiences. Q magazine included the soundtrack album in their list of the '5 Best Compilations of 2000'.

In August 2021, it was reported that Aaliyah's recorded work for Blackground (since rebranded as Blackground Records 2.0) would be re-released on physical, digital, and, for the first time ever, streaming services in a deal between the label and Empire Distribution. Romeo Must Die: The Album was re-released on September 3, 2021.

== Commercial performance ==
In the United States, the soundtrack debuted at number 3 on the Billboard 200 and topped the Top R&B/Hip-Hop Albums chart selling 203,000 in its first week. It was certified Platinum by the Recording Industry Association of America on May 2, 2000 for selling a million copies. The album sold 1.3 million copies by the end of 2000. By 2001 the album sold 1.5 million copies domestically and over 2 million copies internationally.

In Canada, the soundtrack peaked at number 4 and was certified Platinum by Music Canada. The album reached number 6 in Germany and lasted at number 76 in the year-ending. In 2013, it also was certified Silver by the British Phonographic Industry.

== Track listing ==
No.	Title	Writer(s)	Producer(s)	Length
1.	"Try Again" (performed by Aaliyah)	Stephen Garrett; Timothy Mosley	Timbaland	4:45
2.	"Come Back in One Piece" (performed by Aaliyah and DMX)	Static Major; Earl Simmons; Irving Lorenzo; Robert Mays; Bernard Worrell; George Clinton; William Collins	Irv Gotti; Lil' Rob	4:19
3.	"Rose in a Concrete World (J Dub Remix)" (performed by Joe)	Joseph Thomas; Joshua Paul Thompson	Joe; Joshua Thompson	4:50
4.	"Rollin' Raw" (performed by B.G.)	Christopher Dorsey; Byron Thomas	Mannie Fresh	4:00
5.	"We at It Again" (performed by Timbaland & Magoo)	T. Mosley; Melvin Barcliff; Garrett; Garland Mosley	Timbaland	4:45
6.	"Are You Feelin' Me?" (performed by Aaliyah)	Melissa Elliott; T. Mosley	Timbaland	3:11
7.	"Perfect Man" (performed by Destiny's Child)	Beyoncé Knowles; Eric Seats; Rapture Stewart	Eric Seats; Rapture Stewart	3:47
8.	"Simply Irresistible" (performed by Ginuwine)	Garrett; T. Mosley; Brian Kidd	Timbaland; Brian Kidd (co.)	4:01
9.	"It Really Don't Matter" (performed by Confidential)	Edward Ruiz; Franchesco Ferraro; Juan Enrique Figueroa; Louis M. Vizzo; Robert Scalere Jr.; Jeffery Walker	J Dub	4:08
10.	"Thugz" (performed by Mack 10 and Tha Comrads)	Dedrick D'Mon Rolison; Kelly Garmon; Terrell Anderson; Anthony Banks	Ant Banks	4:13
11.	"I Don't Wanna" (performed by Aaliyah)	Johntá Austin; Phalon Alexander; Donnie Scantz; Kevin Hicks	Donnie Scantz; Kevin Hicks	4:16
12.	"Somebody Gonna Die Tonight" (performed by Dave Bing and Lil' Mo)	Dave Bing; Cynthia Loving; Lorenzo; Mays	Irv Gotti; Lil' Rob	4:36
13.	"Woozy" (performed by Playa)	Garrett; Benjamin Bush; Jawaan Peacock; Matthew Brown	Playa; B-12	4:10
14.	"Pump the Brakes" (performed by Dave Hollister)	Bush; Seats; Stewart	Eric Seats; Rapture Stewart	4:27
15.	"This Is a Test" (performed by Chanté Moore)	Chanté Moore; Seats; Stewart; Garrett	Eric Seats; Rapture Stewart	3:20
16.	"Revival" (performed by Non-A-Miss)	K. Dang; M. Calaguas; Walker	J Dub	4:57
17.	"Come On" (performed by Sonja Blade)	Sonja Holder; Anthony Moody	D-Moet	3:50
18.	"Swung On" (performed by Stanley Clarke and Politix)	Stanley Clarke; Myron McKinley	Stanley Clarke	3:16
Total length:				1:14:25

Notes

- Tracks 8, 13, 14, 16, 17 and 18 did not appear in the film

=== Other songs ===
- These songs did appear in the film but were not released on the soundtrack:
  - "First I'm Gonna Crawl" performed by DMX (appears on Nutty Professor II: The Klumps (soundtrack))
  - "You're Not From Brighton" performed by Fatboy Slim
  - "I See You Baby (Full Frontal Mix)" performed by Groove Armada and Gramma Funk
  - "Inside My Mind/Blue Skies" performed by Groove Armada
  - "High Roller" and "Keep Hope Alive" performed by The Crystal Method
  - "Going Home" performed by DJ Frane

== Charts ==
=== Weekly charts ===
Chart (2000)	Peak position
Australian Albums (ARIA)	15
Austrian Albums (Ö3 Austria)	18
Belgian Albums (Ultratop Flanders)	15
Belgian Albums (Ultratop Wallonia)	14
Canadian Albums (Nielsen SoundScan)	5
Canadian R&B Albums (Nielsen SoundScan)	7
Canada Top Albums/CDs (RPM)	4
Dutch Albums (Album Top 100)	59
European Top 100 Albums (Music & Media)	22
French Albums (SNEP)	60
German Albums (Offizielle Top 100)	6
New Zealand Albums (RMNZ)	17
Swiss Albums (Schweizer Hitparade)	18
UK Compilation Albums (Official Charts)	25
UK R&B Albums (Official Charts)	14
US Billboard 200	3
US Top R&B/Hip-Hop Albums (Billboard)	1

Chart (2002)	Peak position
UK Soundtrack Albums (Official Charts)	13

=== Year-end charts ===
Chart (2000)	Position
Canadian Albums (Nielsen SoundScan)	80
German Albums (Offizielle Top 100)	76
US Billboard 200	60
US Top R&B/Hip-Hop Albums (Billboard)	19

Chart (2001)	Position
Canadian R&B Albums (Nielsen SoundScan)	178
Canadian Rap Albums (Nielsen SoundScan)	92

=== Decade-end charts ===
Decade-end chart performance for Romeo Must Die: The Album
Chart (2000–2009)	Position
US Top R&B/Hip-Hop Albums (Billboard)	96

== Certifications ==
Region	Certification	Certified units/sales
Canada (Music Canada)	Platinum	100,000^{^}
United Kingdom (BPI)	Silver	60,000^{*}
United States (RIAA)	Platinum	1,000,000^{^}
^{*} Sales figures based on certification alone.^{^} Shipments figures based on certification alone.

== Release history ==
Release history and formats for Romeo Must Die: The Album
Region	Date	Edition(s)	Format(s)	Label(s)	Ref.
Canada	March 14, 2000	Standard	CD	Virgin	
United States	March 21, 2000	Standard	CD	Virgin	
Japan	May 10, 2000	Standard	CD	EMI Music Japan	

== See also ==
- List of Billboard number-one R&B albums of 2000
