= Try Again (Aaliyah song) =

2000 single by Aaliyah

- North American editions cover

Single by Aaliyah

from the album Romeo Must Die: The Album
- B-side: "Come Back in One Piece"
- Released: March 21, 2000
- Recorded: 1999
- Studio: Manhattan Center (New York City)
- Genre: R&B; electro; dance-pop; trip hop
- Length: 4:45 (album version); 4:05 (radio edit)
- Label: Blackground; Virgin
- Songwriters: Timothy Mosley; Stephen Garrett
- Producer: Timbaland

Aaliyah singles chronology
"I Don't Wanna" (2000)	"Try Again" (2000)	"Come Back in One Piece" (2000)

Music video
- "Try Again" on YouTube

Alternative cover
- International editions cover

"Try Again" is a song recorded by American singer Aaliyah for the soundtrack to Romeo Must Die (2000). After its initial release, it appeared as a bonus track on international editions of Aaliyah's eponymous third and final studio album (2001). The song was written by Static Major and Timbaland, while production was handled by the latter. "Try Again" was released to Rhythmic contemporary radio stations by Blackground and Virgin Records on March 21, 2000. Musically, it is an R&B, electro, dance-pop, and trip hop song. It also includes influences from hip hop, EDM, and acid house. The intro contains an interpolation from Eric B. & Rakim's song "I Know You Got Soul" (1987). Lyrically, the narrator (Aaliyah) encourages a potential partner not to give up when she initially rejects his advances.

The song received critical acclaim from music critics for its innovative futuristic production. In retrospective reviews, critics have credited the song for helping "smuggle the innovative techniques of electronic dance music onto the American pop charts". In 2001, Aaliyah earned a Grammy Award nomination for Best Female R&B Vocal Performance for the song at the 43rd Annual Grammy Awards. Aside from its critical success, the song enjoyed commercial success as well. In the United States, it peaked atop the Billboard Hot 100, becoming the first single to reach number one based solely on airplay. Internationally, "Try Again" peaked within the top ten in Australia, Belgium, Canada, Denmark, Germany, Iceland, the Netherlands, Norway, Portugal, Switzerland, and the United Kingdom.

An accompanying music video for "Try Again" was directed by Wayne Isham. It is a dance-heavy video that combines futuristic elements with re-created stunt scenes from Aaliyah's film Romeo Must Die. In addition, Aaliyah's co-star Jet Li and producer Timbaland appear in the video. After its release, the video received acclaim from the music industry, winning Best Female Video and Best Video from a Film at the 2000 MTV Video Music Awards. The video also was nominated for Best R&B Clip and Maximum Vision Video at the 2000 Billboard Music Video Awards. In 2001, the video earned a nomination for Outstanding Music Video at the NAACP Image Awards. Throughout the years, critics have praised the video for its fashion and choreography, with many deeming Aaliyah's look iconic.

== Background and production ==
In 1999, Aaliyah landed her first movie role in Romeo Must Die (2000), a loose adaptation of William Shakespeare's Romeo and Juliet. Aaliyah starred opposite martial artist Jet Li, playing Trish O'Day and Han Sing, a couple who fall in love amid their warring families. It grossed US$18.6 million in its first weekend, reaching number two at the box office. In addition to acting, Aaliyah served as an executive producer of the film soundtrack, to which she contributed four songs, including "Try Again". Aaliyah revealed that the production team "actually talked about the soundtrack before we even shot the movie".

"Try Again" was recorded at Sound on Sound Studios in New York City and was originally written as an inspirational song. According to engineer Jimmy Douglass, it was "written to inspire young people, but Barry [Hankerson] heard it and told them, 'It's got to be about love'." After all the changes were made to the song, the melody and hook remained the same but the lyrics became love-themed. It was written by Stephen "Static Major" Garrett and Timothy "Timbaland" Mosley, and produced by the latter.

Timbaland created the beat by accident while playing around with a keyboard. In an interview he stated, "I was playing with this keyboard," he began. "And it was a mistake, and my engineer Jimmy Douglass caught it. I said, 'Jimmy did you catch that lil rhythm?, [and] he said, 'I sure did. So [after] he caught it and played it back, I put the beat on it. I said, 'Ooo, chop it right there,' and he chopped it right there." During the production stages of the song, rapper Jay-Z was one of the few people to hear it and he declared that it was going to be a hit. "When Jay-Z came in the studio, he was like, 'Oh my God,' and that's when I was like, 'Yeah, we got one,'" said Timbaland.

== Music and lyrics ==
"Try Again"
A 24-second sample of the song's chorus, which features Aaliyah singing over an electro background.

Musically, "Try Again" is an R&B, electro, and dance-pop song. It was also described as being "classic Aaliyah trip hop". James Poletti from Dotmusic, stated that the song's sound is associated with Detroit techno. Other genres that are utilized within the songs instrumental is hip hop, early EDM of the 2000s, and acid house. MusicNotes published this song in the key of C♯ minor in common time with a tempo of 92 beats per minute. Aaliyah's vocals range from G♯_{3} to G♯_{4}. Katie Atkinson from Billboard said its production "skews more toward the fuzzy electronic sounds of the future than the thumping hip-hop beats of the past". The Guardian writer Alexis Petridis further explained that the production features "disembodied backing vocals, electronically treated string and flute samples, speaker-rumbling bass, and the sort of grinding synthesiser riff more usually found on late-1980s acid-house records". While, Craig Jenkins from Complex mentioned that it incorporates, "programmed snares, kicks and shakers for drums" while also implementing "a wide array of synth sounds, sitars, horns, guitars, and a snaky, distorted bass line underneath it all". The Buffalo News writer Craig Seymour felt that "the song announces itself with horn blasts straight out of a Renaissance processional and then it thrusts you onto a ripping electro-bass roller coaster with Aaliyah's airy voice serving as the wind blowing through your hair". Vocally throughout the record, "Aaliyah's voice is as nimble as ever, slinkily sliding over the synth line and icing the techno-inspired beat with her R&B finesse". As "the song nears the end, a haunting growling noise stalks the edges of the mix like a monster on the prowl".

Lyrically, Aaliyah encourages "a potential partner not to give up on her". Gil Kaufman from Billboard interpreted the lyrics as, "her step-by-step instructions on how to win your way into her shy heart despite what seems like a hard "no" on going forward.... until she crucially lets her guard down in the bridge and is like, "c'mon, man! you know how this game is played! Hang in there!." In his analyses of the lyrics, Tom Brehian from Stereogum said, "Maybe she's stringing this other person along. Maybe she just hasn't made up her mind yet. Either way, it seems totally plausible that this other person would want to keep trying". During the song's intro, Timbaland pays homage to Eric B. & Rakim by interpolating the duo's opening verse from "I Know You Got Soul". The song "doesn't really have a bridge, and it repeats its chorus a whole lot of times". The chorus line "If at first you don't succeed, then dust yourself off and try again" is hypnotically repeated in a fashion similar to the sampling and vocal manipulation found in house music.

== Release and promotion ==
On February 18, 2000, it was announced that "Try Again" would be released as the lead single from the Romeo Must Die: The Album soundtrack, while an accompanying music video would be directed by Wayne Isham. Blackground Records and Virgin Records officially serviced it to rhythmic contemporary radio in the United States on March 21, and to contemporary hit radio on April 4. On May 22, a maxi CD single was issued in Europe. In Australia, "Try Again" was released as a CD single on July 3, 2000, while in the United Kingdom, the single was released on July 10, 2000, via three formats: CD, cassette, and 12-inch vinyl.

In August 2021, it was reported that Aaliyah's recorded work for Blackground (since rebranded as Blackground Records 2.0) would be re-released on physical, digital, and, for the first time ever, streaming services in a deal between the label and Empire Distribution. Romeo Must Die was re-released on September 3, 2021, including "Try Again".

=== Live performances ===
To promote "Try Again" and Romeo Must Die, Aaliyah performed the song during numerous televised appearances. It was first performed alongside "Come Back in One Piece" (featuring DMX) on Romeo Must Die: The Kickoff Special, which aired on MTV in March 2000. Aaliyah performed it again on The Rosie O'Donnell Show on April 17. On April 26, she performed the song on both Total Request Live and The Tonight Show with Jay Leno. Rap-Up ranked her at TRL performance as one of her 10 greatest live performances saying, "As her only song to top the Billboard Hot 100 chart, there was no shortage of Aaliyah performing 'Try Again,' but it was her 2000 live performance on MTV's TRL—with her sign-of-the-times bedazzled belt and signature belly dance (amidst that always seamless, almost liquid-like choreography)—that stayed in heavy rotation, and for good reason." Yardbarker ranked the performance at number 1 on its "15 iconic TRL performances" list saying, "just one year before her tragic death in a 2001 plane crash, R&B sensation Aaliyah pulled off an engaging performance of her song "Try Again" in front of a spring break crowd that couldn't get enough".

To promote "Try Again" in the United Kingdom, Aaliyah performed it via satellite on the July 21, 2000 episode of Top of the Pops. Siân Pattenden from Mixmag said "she looked sultry, perhaps a little sulky", on her Top Of The Pops performance, and that even her "dancing was low-key".

== Critical reception ==
Oliver VanDervoort from AXS said the song has a "kind of futuristic beat" and that it has a "rather memorable line, having to do with hitting on a girl that goes, If at first you don't succeed, dust it off and try again". Ed Masley from AZCentral called the song "Another avant-garde gem from the Timbaland school of future funk". Chuck Taylor from Billboard felt that Aaliyah had another smash hit on her hands and praised her vocal styling by saying: "Aaliyah's sultry vocals slide all over the futuristic beat". However, he had a mixed response to the production, although he thought the synth sample and snare alternate lived up to his expectations, he ultimately felt that the synth sample "becomes grating as the song progresses." Amy Mackelden from Bustle thinks that "Try Again", is Aaliyah's best song "because of its inspirational lyrics and flawless sound". She also mentioned that the song has "an unforgettable music video and an empowering message". James Poletti from Dotmusic said the chorus "refuses to leave your brain after a couple of listens" and that it was a "class Timbaland product" which would be equally successful in Europe.

Robert Hilburn from the Los Angeles Times gave a mixed review of the song saying, Toni Braxton "would have brought more vocal presence to this smash from the Romeo Must Die soundtrack, but Aaliyah does express the youthful optimism of co-writer-producer Timbaland's gently taunting ode to romantic resilience". In his review of Romeo Must Die: The Album, Christopher O'Conner from MTV News said "It's been a long time/ We shouldn't have left you/ Without a dope beat to step to, Timbaland proclaims in his murky voice as the electronica fuzz bass of "Try Again" kicks off the album. He's not bold. He's not out of line. He's just honest. And he's right". Music Week labeled the song as a "funky uptempo workout" and highlighted its early on radio support. Stephen Dalton from NME mentioned that the songs production was "veering increasingly close to the far fringes of left-field electronica", and that it wouldn't "sound out of place in an underground German techno club".

Renee Bell from Radio & Records said "Try Again" "shows a more mature Aaliyah", and explained that its "positive and encouraging lyrics move the single up the chart, and it continues to receive much love from radio. Who says sex sells? Not all the time". Bell's colleague Rob Neal felt that Aaliyah "hasn't missed a beat" and that her "smooth vocals, along with Timbaland's trade-mark production, are a hit for the urban audience. Neal also praised the song's lyrical content saying, "An encouraging message with clean lyrics and an uptempo beat make this song a winner in three different areas". While reviewing Romeo Must Die: The Album, The Ledger said that Aaliyah steals the show on the soundtrack and that she "makes 'Try Again' and 'Are You Feelin' Me?' soft and sexy" Writers from Variety concluded that Aaliyah "demonstrates her confidence in love" on the song.

== Accolades ==
Awards and nominations for "Try Again"
Year	Award	Category	Result	Ref.
2000	Teen Choice Award	Choice Music – Summer Song	Nominated	
2000	Soul Train Lady of Soul Award	Best R&B/Soul Single – Solo	Nominated	
2000	Soul Train Lady of Soul Award	Best R&B/Soul or Rap Music Video	Nominated	
2000	MTV Video Music Award	Best Female Video	Won	
2000	MTV Video Music Award	Best Video from a Film	Won	
2000	MTV Video Music Award	Best Choreography	Nominated	
2000	Billboard Music Video Award	Best R&B Clip	Nominated	
2000	Billboard Music Video Award	Maximum Vision Video	Nominated	
2000	Billboard Music Award	Top Airplay Single of the Year	Nominated	
2001	Grammy Award	Best Female R&B Vocal Performance	Nominated	
2001	NAACP Image Award	Outstanding Music Video	Nominated	
2001	Soul Train Lady of Soul Award	Best R&B/Soul or Rap Song of the Year	Nominated	

Rankings for "Try Again"
Year	Publication	Accolade	Rank	Ref.
2000	NME	The Top 50 Tracks of 2000	36	
2001	The Village Voice	Pazz & Jop 2000	10	
2005	Pitchfork	The Top 100 Singles of 2000–04	37	
2009	The Daily Telegraph	100 Pop Songs That Defined the Noughties	42	
2009	Pitchfork	The 200 Best Songs of the 2000s	75	
2010	Slant Magazine	The 100 Best Singles of the Aughts	60	
2011	Rolling Stone	100 Best Songs of the 2000s	86	
2011	VH1	100 Greatest Songs of the '00s	65	
2016	Yahoo!	15 Chart Toppers That Didn't Suck (2000s Edition)	–	
2017	Complex	The 100 Best Songs of the 2000s	43	
2018	Liveabout.com	The 100 Best Pop Songs of the 2000s	4	
2019	Rolling Stone	20 Biggest Songs of the Summer: The 2000s	18	
2020	Billboard	The 100 Greatest Songs of 2000: Staff Picks	14	
2020	Spin	The 50 Best Songs of the Year 2000	6	
2021	Cleveland.com	Every No. 1 song of the 2000s ranked from worst to best	9	

== Commercial performance ==
"Try Again" debuted on the US Billboard Hot 100 the week of March 18, 2000, at number 59. During the week of June 17 the song jumped 6-1, becoming the first song ever to peak atop the chart based solely on airplay, as it was not commercially released in the United States. At the time of "Try Again" reaching the top spot, it gained 5.5 million listeners, in total reaching 92 million audience impressions. On the Hot R&B/Hip-Hop Singles & Tracks listing, the song entered the chart at 47 during the week of March 11, 2000. 12 weeks later on May 27, the song reached its peak of number two; it remained on the charts for 27 weeks. The song also peaked at numbers three and one on the Mainstream Top 40 and Rhythmic Top 40 charts, respectively. On the year-end Billboard Hot 100 chart for 2000, the song placed 12th. It placed 98th on the 2000s decade-end Billboard Hot 100. Following its 2021 digital release, the song debuted and peaked at number 19 on the US Digital Song Sales chart for the week of September 25, 2021. In Canada "Try Again" entered the RPM 100 Hit Tracks chart at number 24 on May 1, 2000. 13 weeks later it reached its peak of number five and remained on the charts for 28 consecutive weeks.

In Europe, "Try Again" achieved great success. In Belgium, the song peaked at number five and six respectively in Flanders and Wallonia. It also peaked within the top 10 in Denmark, Germany, Iceland, the Netherlands, Norway, Portugal and Switzerland. In the United Kingdom, it debuted and peaked at number five on the UK Singles Chart, selling 38,000 copies on the week ending July 15, 2000―July 21, 2000. The song spent 15 consecutive weeks on the singles chart and has sold over 209,000 copies, as of 2018; as of 2025, remains Aaliyah's best-selling single in the country. In Australia, the song reached number eight on the ARIA Singles Chart. It became the country's 51st best-selling single of 2000.

== Music video ==
=== Theme and synopsis ===
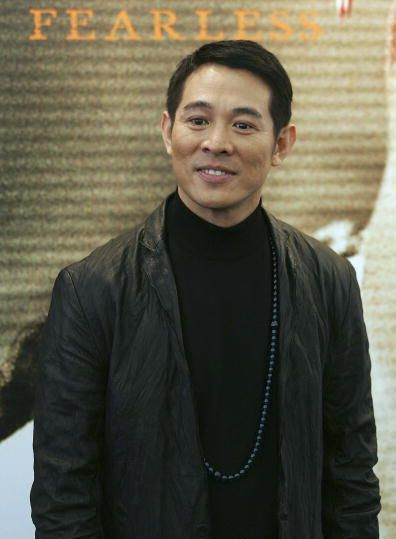
Aaliyah's Romeo Must Die (2000) co-star, Jet Li (pictured) appeared in the video.

The accompanying music video for "Try Again" was directed by Wayne Isham, while choreography was orchestrated by Fatima Robinson. The theme for the video is "a combination of the futuristic vibes of the song mixed with re-created scenes from the movie, along with clips of some actual scenes". Certain scenes includes Jet Li "shadowboxing through a hall of mirrors, with Timbaland in the cut mouthing lines and beatboxing against those same mirrors. According to author-journalist Kathy Iandoli, "There are moments throughout the video where Aaliyah is dancing but also a part where she mimics a fight scene." Iandoli also mentioned that, "since she was already a master of wirework during the filming of the movie, she even climbs the side of the wall while guided by Jet Li".

The video begins with Jet Li entering a hall of mirrors and Aaliyah stepping in, wearing a revealing low-cut bra and tight low-rise leather pants, Timbaland is also shown. The room is dim with a shallow pool and circle light in the center to resemble the moon shining over the ocean represented by said pool. Throughout the video Aaliyah and her backup dancers perform a routine in the dimly lit room. In between the dance scenes, individual scenes of Aaliyah, Jet li and Timabland are shown simultaneously. It ends with Aaliyah "dancing with a black cane, a visual reference to the step shows held by black fraternities".

=== Fashion ===
In an interview with Nylon, Aaliyah's former stylist Derek Lee mentioned that he knew "Try Again" was going to be a dance video and that she was going to "wear one outfit for the entire thing". For the music video Aaliyah wore a crystal bra top with a matching choker by Dolce & Gabbana. Prior to the video Lee had a working relationship with Dolce & Gabbana, and saw an ad for the top, in Vogue. At that time it was "for something that was coming out for pre-order", says Lee. After seeing the ad he knew that outfit would be the look for the video "Because if we needed to level up on her little bra tops with the baggy pants, maybe we should go this route". Dolce & Gabbana had multiple colors and variations of the bra but Lee opted for the plain crystal one because it came with a matching belt and choker. According to Lee, "the crystal bra top offered so little coverage that stylist Joe LeGrand had to add some extra rows of rhinestones so Aaliyah felt more comfortable".

=== Release and reception ===
The music video for "Try Again" made its official television debut on MTV during the week of March 5, 2000. On the week of March 12, the video debuted on the cable network channel VH1. Meanwhile, during the week of April 1, the video debuted on The Box, and for the week of April 3 on BET. During its chart run, the video received heavy television airplay on multiple music oriented network channels. For the week ending May 8, the video was the most played video on BET. On MTV, the video was the third most-played video during the week ending on May 22. In the UK the video debuted on MTV UK during the week of July 21, 2000 at number 3

Time writer Christopher John Farley praised the choreography saying, "As with a woman in her boyfriend's dress shirt, there's something sexy about it." Randall Roberts from the Los Angeles Times said of the choreography, that "Aaliyah moves gracefully and with such natural ease, her arms floating along with the synthesizer lines, her legs stepping to the Roland 303 beat". According to Steffanee Wang from Nylon, "Not only is Aaliyah slaying choreography in a diamond-encrusted bra and choker combo, she also manages to nail some insane gravity-defying stunts with help from none other than martial arts legend Jet Li. Talk about a collab!." Zoë Kendall from i-D said the outfit from the video "is widely considered to be the most iconic of Aaliyah's career". Shama Nasinde from Teen Vogue wrote, "Aaliyah's iconic look from her "Try Again" music video still has a hold on pop culture today". Over the years Several celebrities have recreated the "Try Again" look for halloween including Keke Palmer in 2015 and Kim Kardashian in 2017. While briefly highlighting the video Tom Breihan from Stereogum mentioned Aaliyah's change in style, saying, "But Aaliyah, rocking an extremely sparkly bra/choker situation, brings her strange angular star power to every frame she's in. She'd come a long way from the baggy leather jeans and skullies that she'd been rocking a few years earlier. Here, her swagger comes across as pure glamor".

== Legacy ==
"Try Again" helped smuggle the innovative techniques of electronic dance music onto the American pop charts, and it established Aaliyah as pop music's most futuristic star.

— Kelefa Sanneh, The New York Times

"Try Again" became the first airplay track to reach No. 1 on the Billboard Hot 100 without the benefit of a retail single. Alexis Petridis from The Guardian felt that the song was "one of the most remarkable and forward-thinking pop singles of 2000". While, Jonathan Keefe from Slant Magazine, stated that it has "influenced hip-hop, dance, and pop over the nine years that followed". He also felt that after "Try Again", much of the decade's rhythmic music rested on the shoulders of thin-voiced, icily detached singers like Rihanna, Alison Goldfrapp, Ciara, and Annie, none of whom have been able to match the presence or the lived-in soulfulness Aaliyah conveyed with her ethereal wisp of a voice".

George Michael sampled "Try Again" in his 2002 song "Freeek!" from his album Patience. German NDH band Knorkator covered the song on their album Ich hasse Musik. In "Christmas Party Sex Trip", a 2013 episode of The Mindy Project, Dr. Danny Castellano (portrayed by Chris Messina) showed Dr. Mindy Lahiri (portrayed by Mindy Kaling) the choreography from the song's music video. The song was also featured in the coming-of-age drama film Boyhood (2014). Billboard ranked the song at number 225 on their Greatest of All Time Songs of the Summer chart. On August 21, 2019, the Madame Tussauds Las Vegas revealed a wax figure of Aaliyah. The life-sized figure was modelled on Aaliyah's appearance in the music video for "Try Again". It was unveiled by Aaliyah's brother Rashad Haughton to an invited audience. Rapper Bia recalled that "rap was introduced to her with some R&B flavor" through "Try Again". According to her, "I remember during childhood that the song really stuck out to me, I knew every dance move. I emulated that song. ... I was like 'This is me.'"

In November 2025, singer Kehlani released the official music video to single "Out the Window", in which she visually referenced the "Try Again" music video. On May 15, 2026, American singer Brooke Hogan released a cover version of "Try Again".

== Track listings ==
- US 7-inch jukebox vinyl

A. "Try Again" – 4:05
B. "Come Back in One Piece" (featuring DMX) – 4:18

- US 12-inch vinyl single and UK CD single
1. "Try Again" (album version) – 4:44
2. "Try Again" (Timbaland remix) – 4:59
3. "Try Again" (D'Jam Hassan remix) – 4:50
4. "Try Again" (instrumental) – 4:38
- UK 12-inch vinyl single

A1. "Try Again" (Timbaland remix) – 4:59
A2. "Try Again" (D'Jam Hassan remix) – 4:50
B1. "Try Again" (album version) – 4:44
B2. "Try Again" (instrumental) – 4:38

- European CD single
1. "Try Again" – 4:04
2. "Try Again" (Timbaland remix) – 4:59
- French 12-inch vinyl single

A1. "Try Again" (radio edit) – 4:04
A2. "Try Again" (instrumental) – 4:43
B1. "Try Again" (Timbaland remix) – 4:59

- Australian CD single
1. "Try Again" – 4:04
2. "Try Again" (Timbaland remix) – 4:59
3. "Try Again" (D'Jam Hassan remix) – 5:28
4. "Try Again" (instrumental) – 4:43

== Charts ==
=== Weekly charts ===
Weekly chart performance for "Try Again"
Chart (2000)	Peak position
Australia (ARIA)	8
Australian Urban (ARIA)	2
Austria (Ö3 Austria Top 40)	19
Belgium (Ultratop 50 Flanders)	6
Belgium (Ultratop 50 Wallonia)	5
Canada Top Singles (RPM)	5
Canada Dance/Urban (RPM)	2
Denmark (IFPI)	5
Europe (European Hot 100 Singles)	6
Europe (European Radio Top 50)	17
France (SNEP)	26
Germany (GfK)	5
Iceland (Íslenski Listinn Topp 40)	5
Ireland (IRMA)	34
Italy (FIMI)	19
Netherlands (Dutch Top 40)	3
Netherlands (Single Top 100)	3
New Zealand (Recorded Music NZ)	13
Norway (VG-lista)	5
Portugal (AFP)	5
Quebec (ADISQ)	39
Scottish Singles Sales (Official Charts)	26
Sweden (Sverigetopplistan)	15
Switzerland (Schweizer Hitparade)	8
UK Singles (Official Charts)	5
UK Dance (Official Charts)	4
UK Hip Hop/R&B (Official Charts)	2
US Billboard Hot 100	1
US Dance Singles Sales (Billboard)	13
US Hot R&B/Hip-Hop Songs (Billboard)	4
US Pop Airplay (Billboard)	3
US Rhythmic Airplay (Billboard)	1
US Top 40 Tracks (Billboard)	1

Chart (2021)	Peak position
US R&B Digital Song Sales	3

Chart (2026)	Peak position
Nigeria Bubbling Under Top 100 (TurnTable)	22

=== Year-end charts ===
Year-end chart performance for "Try Again"
Chart (2000)	Position
Australia (ARIA)	51
Belgium (Ultratop 50 Flanders)	39
Belgium (Ultratop 50 Wallonia)	18
Denmark (IFPI)	34
Europe (European Hot 100 Singles)	39
Europe (European Radio Top 100)	46
France (SNEP)	73
Germany (Media Control)	40
Iceland (Íslenski Listinn Topp 40)	23
Italy (Musica e dischi)	92
Netherlands (Dutch Top 40)	22
Netherlands (Single Top 100)	33
New Zealand (RIANZ)	46
Norway Summer Period (VG-lista)	17
Sweden (Hitlistan)	83
Switzerland (Schweizer Hitparade)	37
UK Singles (OCC)	108
UK Urban (Music Week)	6
US Billboard Hot 100	12
US Hot R&B/Hip-Hop Singles & Tracks (Billboard)	18
US Hot Soundtrack Singles (Billboard)	2
US Mainstream Top 40 (Billboard)	14
US Rhythmic Top 40 (Billboard)	3
US Top 40 Tracks (Billboard)	13

=== Decade-end charts ===
Decade-end chart performance for "Try Again"
Chart (2000–2009)	Position
US Billboard Hot 100	98

== Certifications ==
Certifications and sales for "Try Again"
Region	Certification	Certified units/sales
Australia (ARIA)	Platinum	70,000^{^}
Belgium (BRMA)	Gold	25,000^{*}
Denmark	—	4,598
Germany (BVMI)	Gold	250,000^{^}
New Zealand (RMNZ)	Platinum	30,000^{‡}
United Kingdom (BPI)	Gold	400,000^{‡}
^{*} Sales figures based on certification alone.^{^} Shipments figures based on certification alone.^{‡} Sales+streaming figures based on certification alone.

== Release history ==
Release dates and formats for "Try Again"
Region	Date	Format(s)	Label(s)	Ref.
United States	March 21, 2000	Rhythmic contemporary radio	Blackground; Virgin	
United States	April 4, 2000	Contemporary hit radio	Blackground; Virgin	
Germany	May 22, 2000	Maxi CD	EMI	
Australia	July 3, 2000	CD	EMI	
United Kingdom	July 10, 2000	12-inch vinyl; cassette; maxi CD	Virgin	
France	July 11, 2000	CD	Hostile	

== See also ==
- List of Billboard Hot 100 number-one singles of 2000
- List of Billboard Rhythmic number-one songs of the 2000s

== Bibliography ==
- Farley, Christopher John (2002). Aaliyah: More Than a Woman. Simon & Schuster. p. 106. ISBN 0-7434-5566-5.
- Iandoli, Kathy (2021). Baby Girl: Better Known as Aaliyah. Atria Books. ISBN 978-1982156862.
- Jackman, Ian (2000). Total Request Live: The Ultimate Fan Guide. Simon & Schuster. p. 131.
