= Yardbarker =

American digital media property

- Website type: Sports news and information
- Available in: English
- Founded: Emeryville, California, U.S. (March, 2006)
- Headquarters: Burlingame, California, U.S.
- Website: yardbarker.com
- Launched: August 2006
- Current status: Active

Yardbarker is a website for sports and entertainment news and information that has been owned by Fox Sports Interactive since 2010. Founded in 2006, the site also distributes its content on social media platforms and via third-party syndication partners. Yardbarker also curates and distributes The Morning Bark and Quiz of the Day newsletters.

== History ==
Yardbarker was founded in March 2006 by Jack and Jeff Kloster, Pete Vlastelica and Mark Johns as a site for sports fans to write and discuss sports with other fans, bloggers, and professional athletes. Yardbarker.com used a system similar to Digg, but was more sports-oriented than Digg. Additionally Yardbarker provided access to more traditional sports information similar to ESPN or Yahoo!, such as real-time sports scores, standings, and news.

The company was funded by venture capitalists from in and around the San Francisco Bay Area including former NFL player for the San Francisco 49ers and Los Angeles Raiders, Ronnie Lott.

The company provided a platform for bloggers and sports fans to gain additional exposure for their sites by joining the "Yardbarker Network", which provided targeted advertising and promotion. The website was launched in August 2006 and has had over 70 professional athletes blogging on the site daily. The company and its site have been cited as the primary source of material on players in many sports-related stories in their history by sources such as ESPN.

The company had internet exclusivity agreements with some athletes and was used by those athletes to engage in public discourse on a number of issues via blogs run by Yardbarker. One of the more controversial such listings occurred on April 15, 2008. NBA star Carmelo Anthony was arrested and charged with DUI on Interstate 25. The next day Anthony issued his first apology for the arrest through his Yardbarker blog expressing remorse to his teammates and his fans for his behavior.

Another notable example would be in January 2008, Philadelphia Eagles quarterback Donovan McNabb used his blog on Yardbarker to lay out his vision for the coming season after the Eagles poor showing in the 2007 NFL season.

Atlanta Falcons FB Ovie Mughelli leveraged the Yardbarker community for his nickname via a contest in 2008.

Yardbarker's primary product was the Yardbarker Network. As of April 2011 over 900 blogs were part of the YBN, making it one of the largest sports blog networks on the web. Yardbarker was the exclusive blogging website of many high-profile athletes including NBA stars Greg Oden and Baron Davis, MLB player Phil Hughes, former UFC star Frank Shamrock and NFL quarterback Donovan McNabb. John Ryan of the San Jose Mercury News praised Yardbarker in November 2007 for its collection of blogs after reading a posting by Buffalo Bills running back Marshawn Lynch, as being one of the most extensive on the internet.

In October 2008, Yardbarker announced a partnership with Widgetbox. to offer Yardbarker Network members widgets displaying dynamic content around the Yardbarker Network. To date over 600 installs of these widgets have occurred.

In October 2010, Yardbarker was acquired by Fox Sports Interactive. In July 2015, the Yardbarker Network was re-branded as the FOX Sports Engage Network. On January 27, 2016, the FOX Sports Engage Network began terminating affiliate and advertising agreements with written notices sent via UPS.
