= Aaliyah =

American singer (1979–2001)

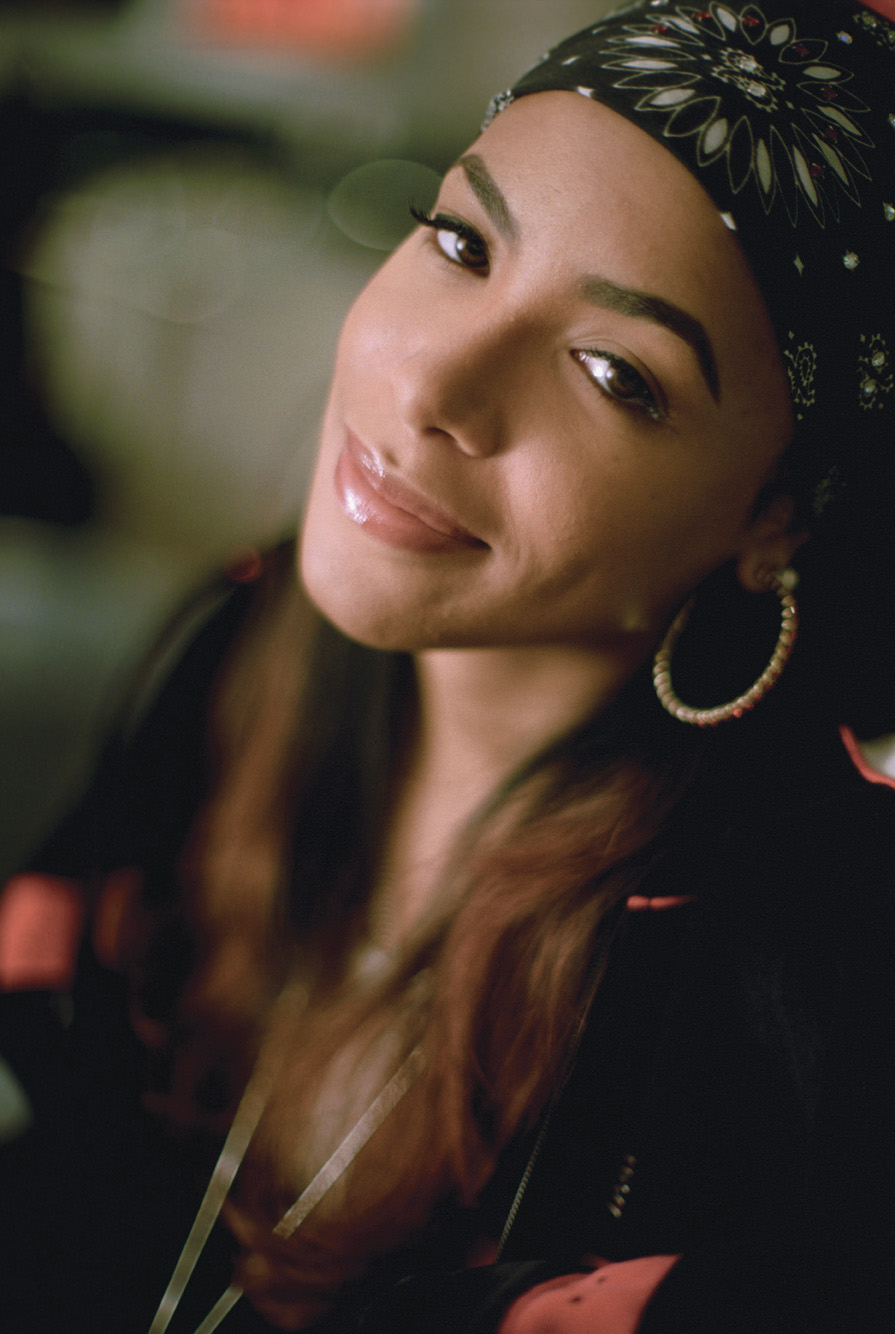
- Aaliyah in 2000
- Born: Aaliyah Dana Haughton; January 16, 1979; New York City, US
- Died: August 25, 2001 (aged 22); Marsh Harbour, Abaco Islands, Bahamas
- Cause of death: Airplane crash
- Burial place: Ferncliff Cemetery
- Other name: Baby Girl
- Occupations: Singer; actress; dancer; model
- Years active: 1989–2001
- Spouse: R. Kelly (m. 1994; ann. 1995)
- Relatives: Rashad Haughton (brother); Barry Hankerson (uncle); Tek (cousin)
- Awards: Full list
- Musical career
- Origin: Detroit, Michigan, US
- Genres: R&B; pop; hip-hop; funk; soul; dance-pop
- Instruments: Vocals
- Labels: Blackground; Jive; Atlantic; Virgin; Universal Records
- Website: aaliyah.com

Aaliyah Dana Haughton (/ɑːˈliːə/ ah-LEE-ə; January 16, 1979 – August 25, 2001) was an American singer, actress, dancer, and model. Known as the "Princess of R&B" and "Queen of Urban Pop", she is credited with helping to redefine contemporary R&B, pop, and hip-hop. Her accolades include three American Music Awards and two MTV VMAs, along with five Grammy Award nominations.

Born in Brooklyn but raised in Detroit, Aaliyah first gained recognition at the age of 10, when she appeared on the television show Star Search and performed in concert alongside Gladys Knight. At the age of 12, she signed with Jive Records and her uncle Barry Hankerson's Blackground Records. Hankerson introduced her to R. Kelly, who became her mentor, as well as lead songwriter and producer of her debut album, Age Ain't Nothing but a Number (1994). The album sold three million copies in the US and was certified double Platinum by the Recording Industry Association of America (RIAA). Her first single, "Back & Forth", rose to number five on the Billboard Hot 100. After allegations of an illegal marriage with Kelly, she ended her contract with Jive and signed with Atlantic Records.

Aaliyah worked with record producers Timbaland and Missy Elliott for her second album, One in a Million (1996), which sold three million copies in the US and more than eight million copies worldwide. She made her acting debut in the action film Romeo Must Die. Its soundtrack was supported by her single "Try Again", the first song to top the Billboard Hot 100 solely through airplay. She subsequently filmed her starring role in Queen of the Damned (2002; released posthumously) and released her third album, Aaliyah (2001), which topped the Billboard 200. The album spawned the singles "We Need a Resolution", "Rock the Boat", and "More Than a Woman".

On August 25, 2001, at the age of 22, Aaliyah was killed in a plane crash along with eight other people on board, when the overloaded aircraft she was traveling in crashed shortly after takeoff. The pilot was later found to have traces of cocaine and alcohol in his body and was not qualified to fly the aircraft designated for the flight. Her family filed a wrongful death lawsuit against the aircraft's operator, which was settled out of court. After her death, her music has continued to achieve commercial success, aided by several posthumous releases, including the compilation albums I Care 4 U (2002) and Ultimate Aaliyah (2005). She has sold 8.1 million albums in the US and an estimated 24 to 32 million albums worldwide.

== Early life ==
Aaliyah Dana Haughton was born on January 16, 1979, in Brooklyn, New York, the younger child of Diane (née Hankerson) and Michael "Miguel" Haughton, a warehouse worker. She was of African-American, Jamaican, and Native American descent. Her name is the feminine form of the Arabic "Ali", meaning "highest, most exalted one, the best." She was fond of her name, calling it "beautiful" and saying she was "very proud of it" and strove to live up to her name every day. When she was five years old, her family moved to Detroit, Michigan, where she was raised along with her older brother, Rashad. In Detroit, her father began working in the warehouse business, one of his brother-in-law Barry Hankerson's widening interests. Her mother stayed home and raised her and her brother. Her mother enrolled her in voice lessons at an early age. Eventually, she started performing at weddings, church choir, and charity events. She attended a Catholic school, Gesu Elementary, where in first grade she was cast in the stage play Annie, which inspired her to become an entertainer.

Aaliyah's mother was a vocalist, and her uncle Hankerson was an entertainment lawyer who had been married to Gladys Knight. As a child, she traveled with Knight and worked with an agent in New York City to audition for commercials and television programs, including Family Matters. After failing to land a role on the show, she continued her acting through the Gesu Players. In 1989, at age ten, she appeared on Star Search, where she performed "My Funny Valentine". She chose to begin auditioning, while her mother made the decision to drop her surname. She auditioned for several record labels and at age 11 appeared in concerts alongside Knight. After attending a Gladys Knight concert with music executive Suge Knight, and seeing Aaliyah perform on stage, rapper Tupac Shakur wanted to sign her to a record deal.

Aaliyah attended Detroit schools and believed she was well-liked, but she was teased for her short stature. By age 15, however, she came to love her height. Her mother told her to be happy she was small and complimented her. Although some children disliked her, she determined that "you always have to deal with people who are jealous, but there were so few it didn't even matter. The majority of kids supported me, which was wonderful." Even in her adult life, she considered herself small. She "learned to accept and love" herself and added that "the most important thing is to think highly of yourself because if you don't, no one else will."

During Aaliyah's audition for acceptance to the Detroit High School for the Fine and Performing Arts, she sang "Ave Maria" in Latin. She held a 4.0 grade-point average when graduating from high school, stating that "I wanted to keep that 4.0. Being in the industry, you know, I don't want kids to think, 'I can just sing and forget about school.' I think it's very important to have an education, and even more important to have something to fall back on." She considered a future career teaching music, music history or drama if she did not make a living as a recording artist because "when you pick a career it has to be something you love."

== Career ==
=== 1991–1995: Age Ain't Nothing but a Number ===
After Hankerson signed a distribution deal with Jive Records, he signed Aaliyah to his Blackground Records label at the age of 12. Hankerson later introduced her to recording artist and producer R. Kelly, who became her mentor, as well as lead songwriter and producer of her first album, recorded when she was 14. Her debut album, Age Ain't Nothing but a Number, was released under her mononym "Aaliyah", by Jive and Blackground Records on May 24, 1994; it debuted at number 24 on the Billboard 200 chart, selling 38,000 copies in its first week. It peaked at number 18 on the Billboard 200 and it was certified two times Platinum by the RIAA. To date, the album has sold over 3 million copies in the US. In Canada, the album was certified gold by Music Canada for 50,000 copies in shipments. In 2014, Vibe magazine estimated that the album had sold six million copies globally.

Upon its release, Age Ain't Nothing But a Number received generally favorable reviews from music critics. Some writers noted that Aaliyah's "silky vocals" and "sultry voice" blended with Kelly's new jack swing helped define R&B in the 1990s. Her sound was also compared to that of female quartet En Vogue. Christopher John Farley of Time magazine called the album a "beautifully restrained work", noting that her "girlish, breathy vocals rode calmly on R. Kelly's rough beats." Stephen Thomas Erlewine of AllMusic felt that the album had its "share of filler", but described the singles as "slyly seductive." He also wrote that the songs on the album were "frequently better" than that of Kelly's second studio album, 12 Play. Billboard criticized the single "At Your Best (You Are Love)" for being out of place on the album and for its length.

Aaliyah's debut single, "Back & Forth", peaked at number 5 on the Hot 100 and topped the Hot R&B/Hip-Hop Songs chart for three weeks. Two more singles charted: a cover of the Isley Brothers' "At Your Best (You Are Love)" peaked at number 6 on the Billboard Hot 100, and the album's title track, "Age Ain't Nothing but a Number", peaked at number 75. Additionally, she released "The Thing I Like" as part of the soundtrack to the 1994 film A Low Down Dirty Shame. In August 1995, she was featured on the single remix to Junior M.A.F.I.A.'s song "I Need You Tonight."

=== 1996–2000: One in a Million and Romeo Must Die ===
"If Your Girl Only Knew" (1996)
The first single released from her second studio album, "If Your Girl Only Knew" was described as a sassy, organ-infused song. Aaliyah was noted for having "smoother, more seductive, and stronger" singing.

In February 1996, Aaliyah was featured on the Kris Kross single "Live and Die for Hip Hop", which also featured Jermaine Dupri (the song's producer) and rapper Da Brat. That year, she left Jive Records and signed with Atlantic Records. She worked with record producers Timbaland and Missy Elliott, who contributed to her second studio album, One in a Million. Elliott recalled Timbaland and herself being nervous to work with Aaliyah, since the latter had already released her successful debut album while Elliott and Timbaland were just starting out. Elliott also feared that Aaliyah would be a diva, but reflected that she "came in and was so warming; she made us immediately feel like family." The album yielded the lead single "If Your Girl Only Knew", which peaked at number 11 on the Billboard Hot 100 and topped the Billboard Hot R&B/Hip-Hop Songs for two weeks. It also generated the singles "Hot Like Fire" and "4 Page Letter". One in a Million peaked at number 18 on the Billboard 200, and was certified double platinum by the RIAA on June 16, 1997, denoting shipments of two million copies. The album went on to sell 3 million copies in the US and over eight million copies worldwide. The year after her album was released, she was featured on Timbaland & Magoo's debut single, "Up Jumps da Boogie".

In 1997, Aaliyah graduated with a 4.0 GPA from the Detroit High School for the Fine and Performing Arts, where she majored in drama. The same year, she began her acting career, playing herself in the police drama television series New York Undercover. During this time, she participated in the Children's Benefit Concert, a charity concert at the Beacon Theatre in New York. She also became the spokesperson for the Tommy Hilfiger Corporation. During her campaign with Tommy Hilfiger, the company sold over 2,400 pairs of the red, white and blue baggy jeans she wore in their advertisements. In December 1997, she performed the Christmas carol "What Child Is This?" at the annual Christmas in Washington television special. She also contributed to the soundtrack album for the animated film Anastasia, performing a cover version of "Journey to the Past" that earned songwriters Lynn Ahrens and Stephen Flaherty a nomination for the Academy Award for Best Original Song. She performed the song at the 70th Academy Awards, becoming the youngest singer to perform at the event. Also in 1998, she released the song "Are You That Somebody?", which was featured on the Dr. Dolittle soundtrack. The song peaked at number 21 on the Billboard Hot 100 and earned her her first Grammy Award nomination.

In 1999, Aaliyah landed her first big-screen acting role in Romeo Must Die. She starred opposite martial artist Jet Li, playing a couple who fall in love amid their warring families. Released on March 24, 2000, the movie grossed US$18.6 million in its first weekend, ranking number two at the box office. She purposely stayed away from reviews of the film to "make it easier on" herself, but heard "that people were able to get into me, which is what I wanted." In contrast, some critics felt there was no chemistry between her and Li, as well as viewing the film as too simplistic. This was echoed by Elvis Mitchell of The New York Times, who wrote that while she was "a natural" and the film was conceived as a spotlight for both her and Li, "they have so little chemistry together you'd think they're putting out a fire instead of shooting off sparks. In addition to acting, she served as an executive producer of the film's soundtrack, for which she contributed four songs. "Try Again" was released as a single from the soundtrack; the song topped the Billboard Hot 100, making her the first artist to top the chart based solely on airplay; this led the song to be released in a 12-inch vinyl and 7-inch single. The music video won the Best Female Video and Best Video from a Film awards at the 2000 MTV Video Music Awards. It also earned her a Grammy Award nomination for Best Female R&B Vocalist. The soundtrack went on to sell 1.5 million copies in the United States.

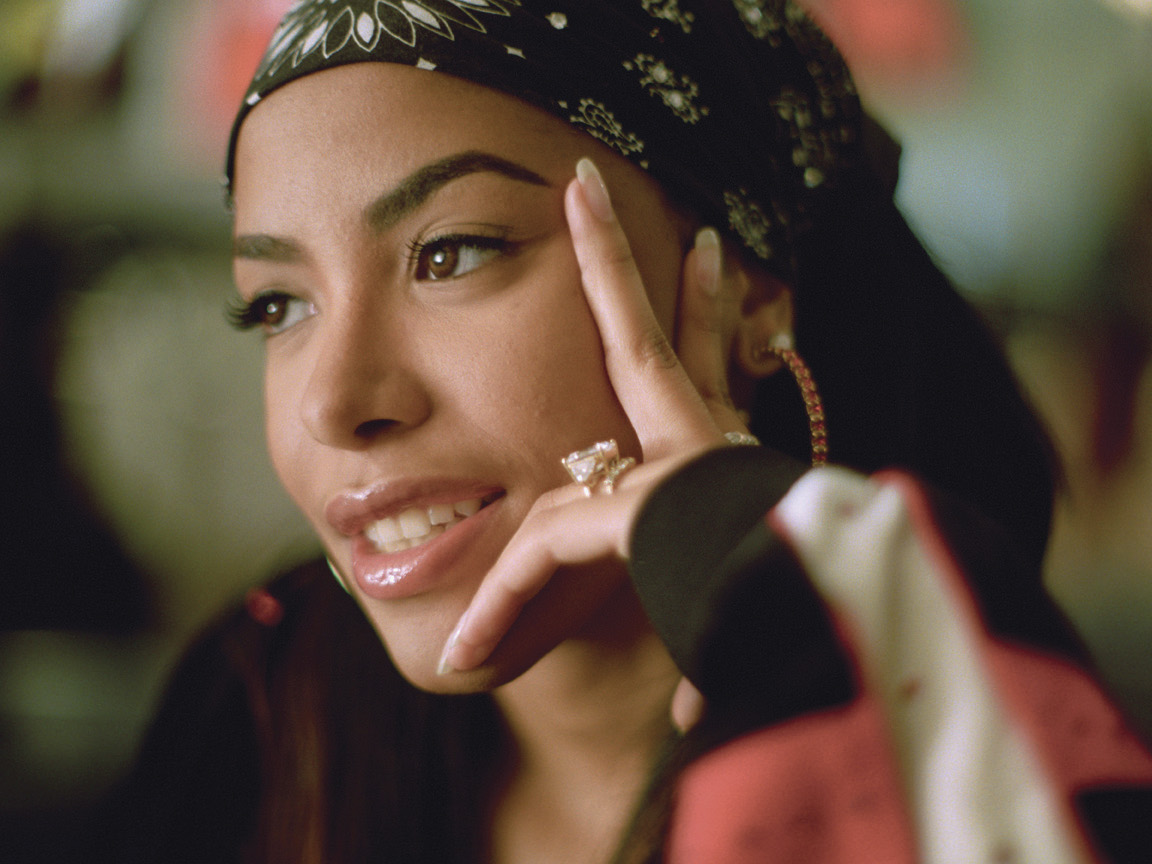
Aaliyah in 2000

=== 2001: Aaliyah and Queen of the Damned ===
After completing Romeo Must Die, Aaliyah began to work on her second film, Queen of the Damned. She played the role of an ancient vampire, Queen Akasha, which she described as a "manipulative, crazy, sexual being". Filming both Romeo Must Die and Queen of the Damned delayed the release of her next album. She had not intended for her albums to have such a gap between them: "I wanted to take a break after One in a Million to just relax, think about how I wanted to approach the next album. Then, when I was ready to start back up, Romeo happened, and so I had to take another break and do that film and then do the soundtrack, then promote it. The break turned into a longer break than I anticipated." Ultimately, she filmed Queen of the Damned and recorded her third album at the same time, so that the album could be released in 2001. She enjoyed balancing her singing and acting careers. Though she called music a "first" for her, she also had been acting since she was young and had wanted to begin acting "at some point in my career", but "wanted it to be the right time and the right vehicle" and felt Romeo Must Die "was it". Connie Johnson of the Los Angeles Times argued that Aaliyah's focus on her film career may have caused her to not give the album "the attention it merited."

During the recording stages for the album, Aaliyah's publicist disclosed that the album's release date would most likely be October 2000. Aaliyah finished recording the album in March 2001 after a year of recording tracks that began in March 2000. Aaliyah was released five years after One in a Million on July 17, 2001, and debuted at number two on the Billboard 200, selling 187,000 copies in its first week. The first single from the album, "We Need a Resolution", peaked at number 59 on the Billboard Hot 100. The week after her death, the album rose from number 19 to number 1 on the Billboard 200. "Rock the Boat" was released as a posthumous single. The music video premiered on BET's Access Granted, and it became the most viewed and highest rated episode in the history of the show. The song peaked at number 14 on the Billboard Hot 100. Promotional posters for Aaliyah that had been put up in major cities such as New York and Los Angeles became makeshift memorials for grieving fans. In February 2002, the album was certified double Platinum by the RIAA.

Aaliyah's songs "More than a Woman" and "I Care 4 U" were released as posthumous singles and peaked within the top 25 of the Billboard Hot 100. "More than a Woman" reached number one on the UK singles chart, making her the first female deceased artist to reach number one on the UK singles chart. "More than a Woman" was replaced by George Harrison's "My Sweet Lord", which is the only time in the UK singles chart's history that a dead artist has replaced another dead artist at number one.

Aaliyah was signed to appear in several future films, including a romantic film titled Some Kind of Blue and a Whitney Houston-produced remake of the 1976 film Sparkle. Houston recalled Aaliyah being "so enthusiastic" about the film; the project was shelved after she died. Before her death, Aaliyah filmed some scenes for the sequels of The Matrix as the character Zee. A portion of her role in The Matrix Reloaded was filmed; these unused scenes were included in the tribute section of the Matrix Ultimate Collection series.

== Artistry ==
=== Voice ===
"Are You That Somebody?" (1998)
Timbaland's stuttering, idiosyncratic productions challenged Aaliyah to reveal her artistic personality more than she had on R. Kelly's smoother musical settings.

Aaliyah had a soprano vocal range. With the release of her debut album Age Ain't Nothing but a Number, writer Dimitri Ehrlich of Entertainment Weekly compared her style and sound to R&B group En Vogue. Ehrlich also stated that her "silky vocals are more agile than those of self-proclaimed queen of hip-hop soul Mary J. Blige." In her review for her second studio album One in a Million in Vibe magazine, music critic Dream Hampton said that her "deliciously feline" voice had the same "pop appeal" as Janet Jackson's. According to Rolling Stone, "the most remarkable thing about Aaliyah's voice, besides its flexibility and crisp range, was its almost preternatural poise — she always seemed to be holding her power in reserve, to know every side of the scenarios she described". Siân Pattenden from Mixmag stated that "she doesn't try to toss the caber with vocal athleticism. There's no shouting, screeching, wailing or jazz-style noodling. Everything is underplayed: Ms Haughton's range is displayed by the slightest high-octave backing and tiniest harmonies".

Aaliyah said that her vocal styling consisted of singing softly while utilizing her falsetto. She further explained that "my signature style is breathy, tone-y, airy. It's simple but I can ride a crazy track." Although she frequently sang in a softer tone, there were moments when she utilized other facets of her voice. Daryl Simmons, the producer of her song "The One I Gave My Heart To", recalled her doing opera vocal warm-up exercises in preparation for recording, stating that "it was the furthest thing I would have ever thought that she could do. It just blew my mind." The song's writer, Diane Warren, praised Aaliyah's vocals on the song, saying that "it showed her vocal range, and I know a couple of people thought she wouldn't be able to do that song. I thought, 'No, she'll be able to do that.'" Variety expressed a similar sentiment as Warren, saying that "The One I Gave My Heart To" "showcased Aaliyah's ability to hit higher notes." Discussing her approach on "Never Givin' Up", producer Craig King said that "lyrically and vocally she just took you to places that you didn't know she could go".

=== Musical style ===
From the very beginning, Aaliyah opted "for an edgier, more mature sound", and her songs were often both uptempo and dark, revolving around "matters of the heart". She "easily straddled the hip-hop and pop worlds, never projecting the frilliness of her ingénue peers". After her R. Kelly-produced debut album, she worked with Timbaland and Missy Elliott, whose productions were more electronic. The duo "mixed choppy, nervous rhythms over loops of computer-generated backing tracks, and incorporating harmonies which – within the genre's limited horizons – seemed daring". They also created the "freeze-and-stop style of singing on top of bass-heavy instrumentals" that became Aaliyah's signature style. In 2001, she called her sound "street but sweet", pairing feminine vocals with a gritty urban rhythm track. In another interview, she further spoke about her artistry, saying, "I love to fuse other types of music with my own". She explored a wide range of genres such as R&B, pop, hip-hop, funk, soul, and dance-pop. Time music critic Christopher John Farley described her music as alternative R&B, progressive soul, and neo soul.

Aaliyah released "musically risky singles into a notoriously fickle pop market", without being "concerned about conforming to the stereotypes of the marketplace". Her songs "gracefully walk a line between commerciality and experimentation". Her records tended to have a "crisp production" and "staccato arrangements" that "extend genre boundaries" while containing "old-school" soul music. Kelefa Sanneh of The New York Times called her "a digital diva who wove a spell with ones and zeroes", and writes that her songs comprised "simple vocal riffs, repeated and refracted to echo the manipulated loops that create digital rhythm", as Timbaland's "computer-programmed beats fitted perfectly with her cool, breathy voice to create a new kind of electronic music."

In The New Rolling Stone Album Guide (2004), Keith Harris said of Aaliyah's lyrical content that "when it came to sexual availability, she was between En Vogue maliciously taunting 'You're never gonna get it' and Tweet blankly cooing 'Oops, there goes my shirt.'" Lyrically, "her first two albums carefully toed the line between adolescence and adulthood, displaying a woman exploring the terrain of love, trust, and lust; one who exuded a playful innocence while hinting at a more sultry side." She did not usually write her own lyrics. The only time she had a hand in writing was on the song "Death of a Playa" from the 1997 single "Hot Like Fire". She co-wrote that song, which "reflects Aaliyah's dark perspective on romance", with her brother Rashad Haughton. She said of her role in crafting her music that "I like to have the final say but I was trained as a singer, actress and dancer, the interpreter, bringing other people's words to life. I need the songs to reflect me in one way or another".

As Aaliyah's albums progressed, writers felt that she matured, calling her progress a "near-flawless declaration of strength and independence". ABC News noted that her music was "evolving from the punchy pop-influenced hip hop and R&B to a more mature, introspective sound" on her third album. NME called her third album "radical" and said that it was "intended to consolidate her position as [US] R&B's most experimental artist". Stephen Thomas Erlewine of AllMusic described her album Aaliyah as "a statement of maturity and a stunning artistic leap forward", and called it one of the strongest urban soul records of its time. It was described as portraying "unfamiliar sounds, styles and emotions", but managed to please critics with the contemporary sound it contained. Ernest Hardy of Rolling Stone felt that she was displaying stronger technique and giving her best vocal performances on the album.

=== Influences ===
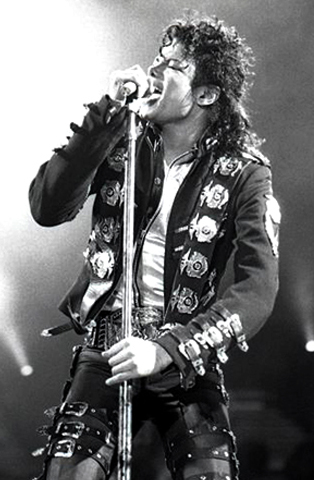
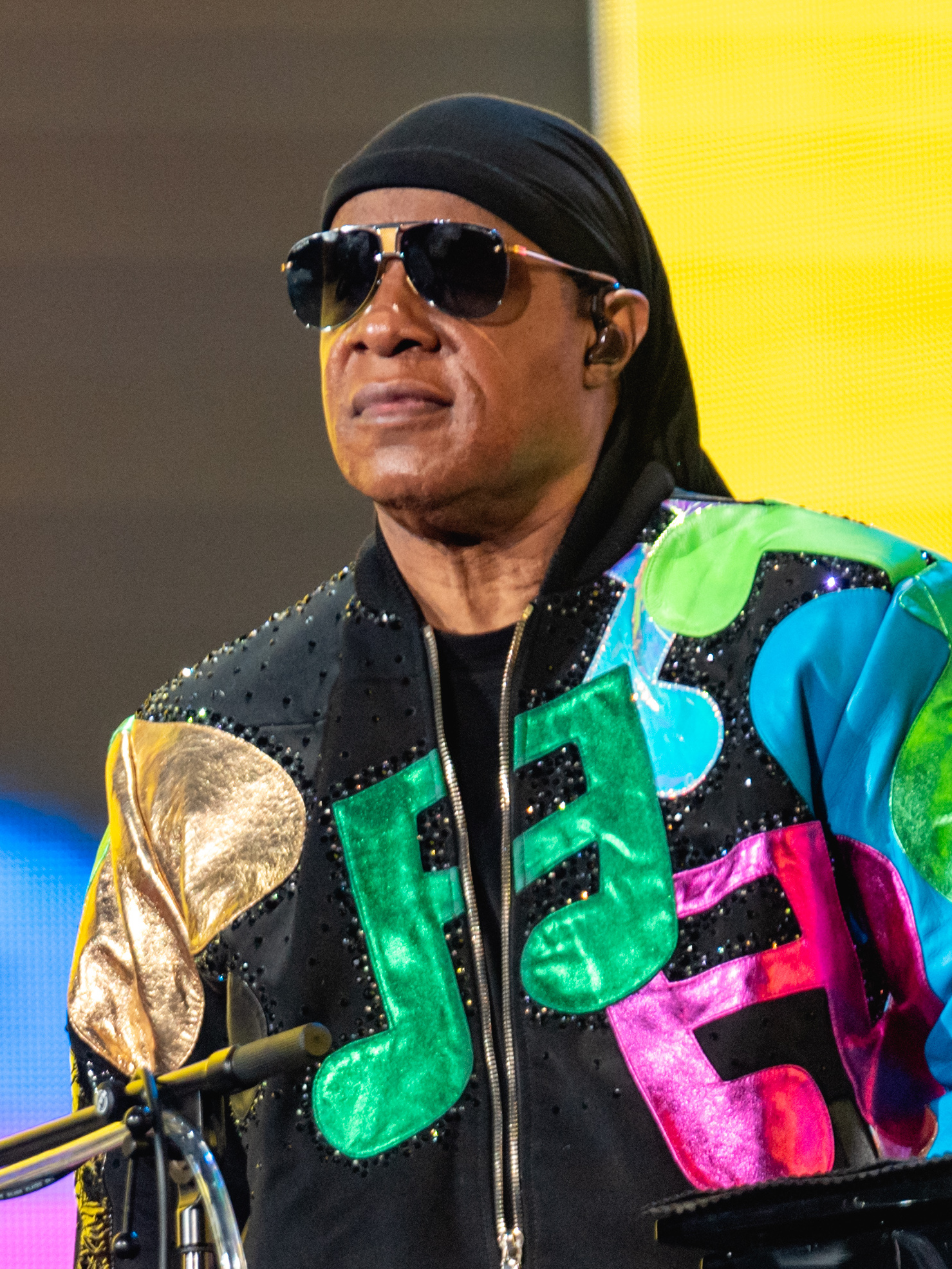
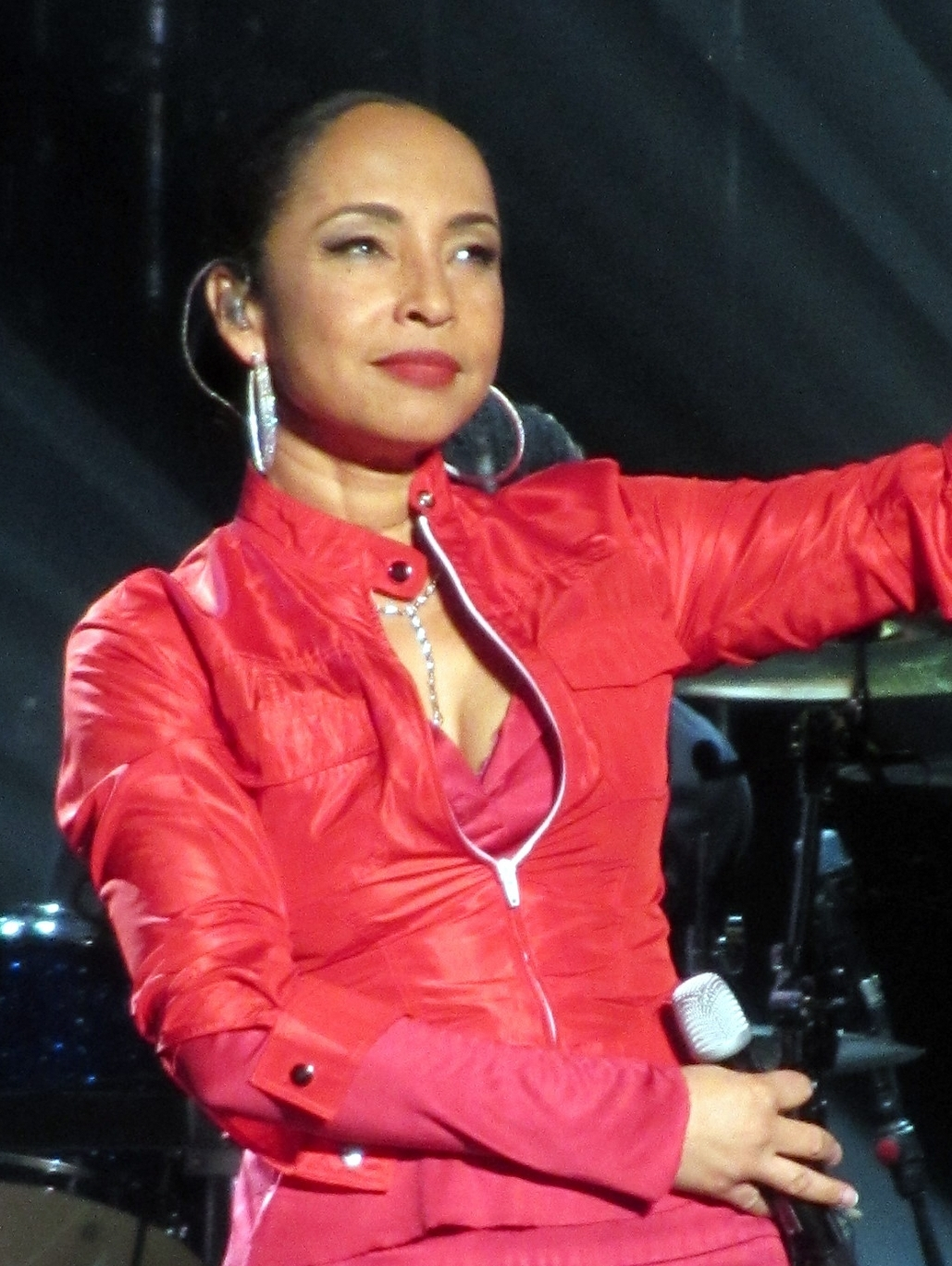
Michael Jackson (left), Stevie Wonder (center), and Sade (right) all influenced Aaliyah and her music.

As an artist, Aaliyah said that she was inspired by a number of performers. These included Michael Jackson, Stevie Wonder, Sade, Trent Reznor of Nine Inch Nails, Korn, Donnie Hathaway, Johnny Mathis, Janet Jackson, Whitney Houston, and Barbra Streisand. She said that Michael Jackson's Thriller was her "favorite album" and that "nothing will ever top Thriller." She said that she had always wanted to work with Janet Jackson, to whom she had often been compared, saying, "I admire her a great deal. She's a total performer ... I'd love to do a duet with Janet Jackson." Jackson reciprocated Aaliyah's affection, saying that "I've loved her from the beginning because she always comes out and does something different, musically." Jackson said that she would have enjoyed collaborating with Aaliyah.

=== Music videos ===
According to director Paul Hunter, "from day one, Aaliyah wanted her videos to stand out from clips by other R&B singers." He stated that "you can watch programming all day and see a certain type of video by female artists, then when one of hers comes on it's something special, something different to look at. That's what she was about." Christopher John Farley from Time magazine stated that her "videos, for the most part, are about mood, not about storylines... Her videos are usually lushly shot and infused with sexual tension, though not in overt and obvious ways".

Alisha Acquaye from Teen Vogue wrote that "there's much to gather while watching an Aaliyah music video", and that terming it "watching" them was "actually an understatement". She explained that "there's a state of hypnosis you submit to as she envelops you through sight and sound, tugging at your heartstrings. Between a sequence of sensual, strong movements, infectious instrumentals, and intuitive lyrics that spark emotions of desire, sex, and empowerment, you are enraptured in Aaliyah's physical presence".

Most of Aaliyah's videos included dance routines. While discussing her video choreography, Billboard mentioned that she "coined the smooth choreography and tomboyish style that would inspire [R&B]'s future generations for years to come". Vibe praised several videos, saying that "looking back on her videos like "Try Again" and "Are You That Somebody", Aaliyah's talent in all of those techniques of dancing are apparent, as she's able to hit every syncopated word and beat with ease as if she's moving on air". Kyann-Sian Williams from NME named "Are You That Somebody?" as a video that "pushed the boundaries when it came to dance breaks in music videos". Williams stated that "until that time, dance breaks were usually reserved for boybands like *NSync and the Backstreet Boys, but Aaliyah claimed it for R&B stars too".

== Public image ==
Aaliyah focused on her public image while protecting her private life. She felt that it was "important ... to differentiate yourself from the rest of the pack". USA Today said that "her slinky vocal style and eye-popping videos made her a crossover star, while her persistent protection of her privacy added an air of intrigue about her". She said that "I put a lot of pressure on myself to be true to myself and not let anything else influence me to do what someone else is doing. Being a little edgy and sexy is me. My image isn't a put-on. I'm happy to put over that dark edge in my videos, because it's always been there. I used to wear my sunglasses or have my hair over one eye a lot more when I was younger. [Now] I'm happy with all aspects of myself."

Aaliyah often wore baggy clothes and sunglasses, stating that she wanted to be herself. She also wore black clothing, starting a trend for similar fashion among women in United States and Japan. In 1998, she hired a personal trainer to keep in shape, exercised five days a week, and ate diet foods. As her career progressed, she went through "many fashion revamps". For example, when she changed her hairstyle, she took her mother's advice and covered her left eye, much like Veronica Lake. The look has become known as her signature and been referred to as a fusion of "unnerving emotional honesty" and "a sense of mystique". In regards to her fashion choices, writer Jeff Lorez described her as a "model of understatement". According to Lorez, "she's beautiful, but hardly in a high-gloss, supermodel way—more like a really good-looking girl next door. And rather than bling-blinging her ice in a ghetto-fabulous manner befitting her Trumped-up surroundings, she blings on the down-low: A subtle bracelet here, a winking pendant there, offset by her simple black jeans and matching sweater. Trés cool". Former Total Request Live host Carson Daly said that she was "cutting edge, always one step ahead of the curve and that the TRL audience looks to her to figure out what's hot and what's new".

Aaliyah was often praised for her "clean-cut image" and "moral values". Robert Christgau of The Village Voice wrote of her artistry and image that "she was lithe and dulcet in a way that signified neither jailbait nor hottie—an ingenue whose selling point was sincerity, not innocence and the obverse it implies." Emil Wilbekin, told CNN that "Aaliyah is an excellent role model because she started her career in the public eye at age 15 with a gold album, Age Ain't Nothing but a Number. And then her second album, One in a Million went double platinum. She had the leading role in Romeo Must Die, which was a box office success. She's won numerous awards, several MTV music video awards, and aside from her professional successes, many of her lyrics are very inspirational and uplifting. She also carried herself in a very professional manner. She was well-spoken. She was beautiful, but she didn't use her beauty to sell her music. She used her talent. Many young hip-hop fans greatly admire her."

Aaliyah was also seen as a sex symbol and did not have a problem with being considered one. "I know that people think I'm sexy and I am looked at as that, and it is cool with me", she stated. "It's wonderful to have sex appeal. If you embrace it, it can be a very beautiful thing. I am totally cool with that. Definitely. I see myself as sexy. If you are comfortable with it, it can be very classy and it can be very appealing." She also felt that though her image was "risque and sexy", it was important to remain respectable because she wanted to make songs that everyone could relate to without it being vulgar. When she participated in fashion designer Tommy Hilfiger's All America Tour Tommy Jean ads, she wore boxer shorts, baggy jeans, and a tube top. Hilfiger's brother, Andy, called it "a whole new look" that was "classy but sexy". The single "We Need a Resolution" was argued to have transformed "the once tomboy into a sexy grown woman".

== Personal life ==
In a 1995 interview with Honey, Aaliyah stated that she was Catholic and attended church whenever she was at home. In 2001, she told Vibe magazine that she was mostly a homebody and liked "the simple things in life."

=== Family ===
Aaliyah's family played a major role in the course of her career. Beginning in 1995, her father served as her personal manager and her mother assisted him. Her brother Rashad Haughton and her cousin Jomo Hankerson were "consistently" with her while she worked. After her father became ill, Rashad became her manager.

Aaliyah was known to have usually been accompanied by members of her family. Rashad stated that the filming of "Rock the Boat" was the only time her family was not present during a video shoot. In October 2001, Rashad said that "it really boggles everyone [that] from Day One, every single video she ever shot there's always been myself or my mother or my father there. The circumstances surrounding this last video were really strange because my mother had eye surgery and couldn't fly. That really bothered her because she always traveled. My dad had to take care of my mom at that time. And I went to Australia to visit some friends. We really couldn't understand why we weren't there. You ask yourself maybe we could have stopped it. But you can't really answer the question. There's always gonna be that question of why." Her friend Kidada Jones said that, in the last year of Aaliyah's life, her parents had given her more freedom and she had spoken about wanting a family.

=== Relationship with R. Kelly ===
Aaliyah reportedly developed an intimate relationship with R. Kelly during the recording of her debut album. She told Vibe magazine in 1994 that she and Kelly would "go watch a movie" and "go eat" when she got tired and would then "come back and work". She described the relationship between her and Kelly as "rather close." In December 1994, she told the Chicago Sun-Times that whenever she was asked about being married to Kelly, she urged them not to believe "all that mess" and that she and Kelly were "close" but that "people took it the wrong way".

With the release of Age Ain't Nothing but a Number, rumors circulated about a relationship between Aaliyah and Kelly, including the allegation that they had secretly married without her parents' knowledge. Vibe magazine later revealed a marriage certificate that listed the couple married on August 31, 1994, in Sheraton Gateway Suites in Rosemont, Illinois. Aaliyah, who was 15 at the time, was listed as 18 on the certificate; R. Kelly was 27. The marriage was annulled by her parents in February 1995, but the pair denied the allegations, saying that neither was married and that the certificate was a forgery.

Jamie Foster Brown wrote in the 1994 issue of Sister 2 Sister that "R. Kelly told me that he and Aaliyah got together, and it was just magic." Brown also reported hearing about a sexual relationship between them: "I've been hearing about Robert and Aaliyah for a while—that she was pregnant. Or that she was coming and going in and out of his house. People would see her walking his dog, 12 Play, with her basketball cap and sunglasses on. Every time I asked the label, they said it was platonic. But I kept hearing complaints from people about her being in the studio with all those men." Brown later added that "at 15, you have all those hormones and no brains attached to them".

In his 2011 book The Man Behind the Man: Looking from the Inside Out, Kelly's former tour manager Demetrius Smith Sr. revealed that Kelly married Aaliyah after she told him that she was pregnant. In the 2019 documentary Surviving R. Kelly, Smith described how he helped her forge documents claiming that she was 18 in order to marry Kelly. Smith also said he was "not proud" of his role in facilitating their marriage. Additionally, the documentary revealed that Jovante Cunningham, a former backup dancer, claimed to have witnessed Kelly having sex with Aaliyah on his tour bus.

Aaliyah admitted in court documents that she had lied about her age. In May 1997, she filed suit in Cook County seeking to have all records of the marriage expunged because she was not old enough under state law to get married without her parents' consent. It was reported that she cut off all professional and personal ties with Kelly after the marriage was annulled and ceased contact with him. In a 2014 interview, her cousin Jomo Hankerson said that she "got villainized" for her relationship with Kelly and the scandal over the marriage made it difficult to find producers for her second album: "we were coming off of a multi-platinum debut album and except for a couple of relationships with Jermaine Dupri and Puffy, it was hard for us to get producers on the album." He also expressed confusion over why "they were upset" with her, given her age at the time.

Aaliyah was known to avoid answering questions about Kelly after the professional split. During an interview with Time's Christopher John Farley, she was asked whether she was still in contact with him and would ever work with him again. Farley said that she responded with a "firm, frosty 'no'" to both questions. Vibe magazine said that she changed the subject any time someone "bring[s] up the marriage with her". A spokeswoman for her said in 2000 that when "R. Kelly comes up, she doesn't even speak his name, and nobody's allowed to ask about it at all." Kelly later said that she had had opportunities to address their relationship after they separated professionally, but chose not to pursue them. In 2019, Damon Dash revealed to Hip Hop Motivation that she did not even speak of her relationship with Kelly in private; that he tried multiple times to discuss it with her, but she would only say that Kelly was a "bad man". Dash said that he was unable to watch Surviving R. Kelly because its interviews with visibly traumatized girls struggling to discuss their encounters with Kelly reminded him of how Aaliyah had behaved when trying to recount her relationship with Kelly. Dash later appeared in Surviving R. Kelly, Part II in 2020.

Other allegations were made about Kelly regarding underage girls in the years after Aaliyah's death, and their marriage was used as an example of his involvement with them. He has refused to discuss his relationship with her, citing her death. "Out of respect for her, and her mom and her dad, I will not discuss Aaliyah. That was a whole other situation, a whole other time, it was a whole other thing, and I'm sure that people also know that." In 2016, Kelly said that he was as in love with her as he was with "anybody else." Her mother, Diane Haughton, claimed that everything "that went wrong in her life" began with her relationship with Kelly.

After Surviving R. Kelly aired in January 2019, pressure from the public using the Mute R. Kelly hashtag escalated, and RCA Records dropped Kelly from the label. In February 2019, Kelly was indicted on ten counts of aggravated criminal sexual abuse. In July 2019, he was arrested on federal charges of sex crimes, human trafficking, child pornography, racketeering, and obstruction of justice. When his trial began in August 2021, Kelly faced 22 federal criminal charges that involved allegedly abusing 11 girls and women between 1994 and 2018. Aaliyah's illegal marriage to Kelly was heavily featured in the court case. On September 27, 2021, a federal court jury found Kelly guilty of nine counts including racketeering, sexual exploitation of a child, kidnapping, bribery, sex trafficking, and a violation of the Mann Act. The judge ordered that Kelly remain in custody pending sentencing, which was set for May 4, 2022. On June 29, 2022, Kelly was sentenced to 30 years in prison.

=== Relationship with Damon Dash ===
Aaliyah was dating Damon Dash, the co-founder of Roc-A-Fella Records, at the time of her death. Although they were not formally engaged, Dash claimed that the couple had planned to marry in interviews given after her death. In the summer of 2000, she was introduced to Dash by his accountant and they formed a friendship. She never publicly addressed their relationship as anything but platonic. Due to their hectic work schedules, she and Dash were separated for long periods of time. Jay-Z mentioned Aaliyah and Dash in a remix of her song "Miss You", released in 2003. In August 2021, Dash told Entertainment Tonight's Kevin Frazier that "I was reflecting [that] there hasn't been one day since she's passed, not one in the 20 years, that I haven't either heard her name, heard her record, or seen a picture of her ... Every single day she's present in my life and I feel lucky for that."

== Death ==
On August 25, 2001, at 6:50 pm (EDT), Aaliyah and some employees of her record company boarded a twin-engine Cessna 402 light aircraft at the Marsh Harbour Airport in Abaco Islands, the Bahamas, to travel to Opa-Locka Airport in Florida after they completed filming the video for "Rock the Boat". They had a flight scheduled the next day, but with filming finishing early, she and her entourage were eager to return to the US and decided to leave immediately. The designated airplane was smaller than the Cessna 404 on which they had originally arrived, but the whole party and all the equipment were accommodated on board. The plane crashed and caught fire shortly after takeoff, about 200 feet (60 m) from the end of the runway. Aaliyah and the eight others on board—pilot Luis Morales III, hair stylist Eric Forman, Anthony Dodd, security guard Scott Gallin, family friend Keith Wallace, make-up stylist Christopher Maldonado, and Blackground Records employees Douglas Kratz and Gina Smith—were killed.

The passengers had grown impatient because the Cessna was supposed to arrive at 4:30 pm. EDT, but did not arrive until 6:15 pm. Another charter pilot, Lewis Key, said that he overheard passengers arguing with pilot Morales before takeoff, adding that Morales had warned them that there was too much weight for a "safe flight". Key added that "he tried to convince them the plane was overloaded, but they insisted they had chartered the plane and they had to be in Miami Saturday night." Key indicated that Morales gave in to the passengers and had trouble starting one of the engines.

According to findings from an inquest conducted by the coroner's office in the Bahamas, Aaliyah suffered "severe burns and a blow to the head" in addition to severe shock and a weak heart. The coroner theorized that she had gone into such a state of shock that even if she had survived the crash, her recovery would have been nearly impossible given the severity of her injuries. The bodies were taken to the morgue at Princess Margaret Hospital in Nassau, where they were kept for relatives to help identify them. Some of them were badly burned.

The subsequent investigation determined that the aircraft was overloaded by more than 900 pounds (410 kg) when it attempted to take off and was carrying one more passenger than it was certified for. The National Transportation Safety Board reported that "the airplane was seen lifting off the runway, and then nose down, impacting in a marsh on the south side of the departure end of runway 27." The report indicated that the pilot was not approved to fly the plane. Morales falsely obtained his FAA license by showing hundreds of hours never flown, and may also have falsified how many hours he had flown to get a job with his employer, Blackhawk International Airways. Additionally, toxicology tests performed on Morales revealed traces of cocaine and alcohol in his system.

=== Funeral ===
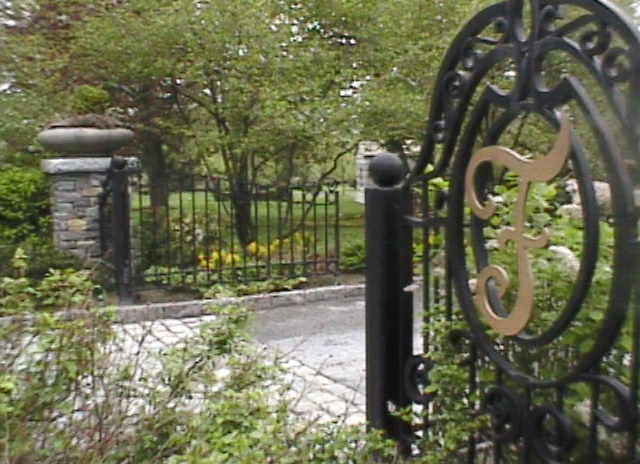
The main entrance to Ferncliff Cemetery, where Aaliyah is interred

Aaliyah's private funeral Mass was held on August 31, 2001, at the Church of St. Ignatius Loyola in Manhattan, following a procession from the Frank E. Campbell Funeral Chapel. Her body was set in a silver-plated copper-deposit casket, which was carried in a horse-drawn, glass hearse. An estimated 800 mourners attended the procession. Among those in attendance at the private ceremony were Missy Elliott, Timbaland, Gladys Knight, Lil' Kim, and Sean Combs. After the service, 22 white doves were released to symbolize each year of her life.

Aaliyah's brother Rashad delivered the eulogy and described her as giving him strength: "Aaliyah, you left, but I'll see you always next to me and I can see you smiling through the sunshine. When our life is over, our book is done. I hope God keeps me strong until I see her again." He read the names of the other victims of the crash and concluded by asking mourners to pray for them as well. As her mother Diane Haughton and the other mourners left, they sang her song "One in a Million".

=== Lawsuit ===
In August 2026, Barry Hankerson's son, Jomo, sued his father, for breaching a settlement over music rights. Specifically, he cites Aaliyah’s recording masters and music publishing copyrights. The documents also show that Barry blamed Jomo for Aaliyah's death, stating that Jomo "failed in his responsibility” to make adequate travel plans, which resulted in a plane crash that “may have been avoided had [Jomo] followed through on his compensated task of travel coordination.”

== Posthumous releases ==
=== 2001–2014: Queen of the Damned, compilations, and single releases ===
Immediately after Aaliyah's death, there was uncertainty over whether the music video for "Rock the Boat" would ever air. It made its world premiere on BET's Access Granted on October 9, 2001. She won two posthumous awards at the American Music Awards of 2002; Favorite Female R&B Artist and Favorite R&B/Soul Album for Aaliyah. Her second and final film, Queen of the Damned, was released in February 2002. Before its release, Aaliyah's brother Rashad re-dubbed some of her lines during post-production. It grossed US$15.2 million in its first weekend, ranking number one at the box office. On the first anniversary of her death, a candlelight vigil was held in Times Square, millions of fans observed a moment of silence, and radio stations throughout the United States played her music in remembrance. In December 2002, a collection of both previously unreleased and released material was issued as her first posthumous album, I Care 4 U. A portion of the proceeds was donated to the Aaliyah Memorial Fund, a program that benefits the Revlon UCLA Women's Cancer Research Program and Harlem's Sloan Kettering Cancer Center. It debuted at number three on the US Billboard 200, selling 280,000 copies in its first week. The album's lead single, "Miss You", peaked at number three on the Billboard Hot 100 and topped the Hot R&B/Hip-Hop Songs chart for three weeks. In August of the following year, luxury fashion house Dior donated profits from sales in her honor.

In April 2005, Aaliyah's second posthumous album, a double CD+DVD box set titled Ultimate Aaliyah, was released in the United Kingdom by Blackground Records. A documentary movie Aaliyah Live in Amsterdam was released in 2011, shortly before the tenth anniversary of her death. The documentary by Pogus Caesar contained previously unseen footage shot of her career beginnings in 1995, when she was appearing in the Netherlands.

In March 2012, music producer Jeffrey "J-Dub" Walker stated that the song "Steady Ground", which he produced for Aaliyah's third album, would be included in a posthumous Aaliyah album. Rashad denied Walker's claim. On August 5, 2012, Blackground Records released the track "Enough Said", which featured vocals by Aaliyah and Canadian rapper Drake and was produced by Noah "40" Shebib. Four days later, Aaliyah's cousin Jomo Hankerson claimed a posthumous album was being produced that would feature new production by Timbaland and Missy Elliott, who both later denied involvement with the project. The album was scheduled to be released by the end of 2012 by Blackground Records, but its release was shelved. In June 2013, Aaliyah's vocals were featured on the track "Don't Think They Know" by Chris Brown, which appears on Brown's sixth studio album, X. Timbaland voiced his disapproval of "Enough Said" and "Don't Think They Know" in July 2013, but later apologized to Chris Brown, explaining that Aaliyah and her death were a "very sensitive subject" for him.

=== 2015–present: Merchandise, catalog rerelease, and Unstoppable ===
In May 2015, Aaliyah was featured on the Tink track "Million", which contained samples from her song "One in a Million". In September 2015, Aaliyah by Xyrena, an official tribute fragrance, was announced. On December 25, 2015, Timbaland released the mixtape Kings Stay Kings, which includes the unreleased Aaliyah song "Shakin" featuring rapper Strado. In June 2018, MAC Cosmetics released the Aaliyah for Mac collection, which was priced at $250 and sold out within minutes. MAC and i-D Magazine partnered up to release a short film titled "A-Z of Aaliyah" that coincided with the launch. On August 21, 2019, the Las Vegas Madame Tussauds museum location unveiled a wax figure of Aaliyah, modeled on her appearance in the "Try Again" music video. Four days later, her family announced that they were in talks with record companies to discuss the future of her discography.

In March 2021, Funko Pop! released an Aaliyah figurine. In August 2021, Blackground Records announced that her recorded works would be re-released on physical, digital, and streaming services in a deal between the label and Empire Distribution. Her estate issued a statement in response to the announcement, denouncing the "unscrupulous endeavor to release Aaliyah's music without any transparency or full accounting to the estate". One in a Million was reissued on August 20. After the album's re-release, One in a Million re-entered the UK Official Hip Hop and R&B Albums Chart Top 40 at number eight. In the US, the album reached the top ten on the Billboard 200 for the first time at number ten, selling 26,000 album-equivalent units in the week ending of August 26. Aaliyah was reissued on September 10. After the album's re-release, Aaliyah re-entered the UK Official Hip Hop and R&B Albums Chart Top 40 at number seven and re-entered the US Billboard 200 chart at number 13. In celebration of the reissue, Blackground released an animated commercial titled "It's Been A Long Time" (in a similar style to the album's original 2001 commercial), directed by Takahiro Tanaka, showing Aaliyah resurrecting her music from out of a large underground vault. The compilation albums I Care 4 U and Ultimate Aaliyah were reissued October 8, 2021. Ultimate Aaliyah peaked at number 8 on the UK R&B Albums Chart Top 40 and charted for the first time in the US at number 41 on the Billboard 200.

On August 25, 2021, Barry Hankerson revealed in an interview with Big Tigger for WVEE that a posthumous album titled Unstoppable would be released in "a matter of weeks". The album was said to feature Drake, Snoop Dogg, Ne-Yo, Chris Brown, and Future, and use previously unreleased vocals from before her death. On December 17, 2021, Background Records released the posthumous Aaliyah single "Poison" featuring The Weeknd. On January 4, 2022, Hankerson claimed that Unstoppable would be released later that month; however, it did not see a release and there was no related announcement from the label. In January 2024, Blackground Records hinted in an Instagram post that the release was "coming".

On January 16, 2025, Mattel released an Aaliyah Barbie doll modeled on her appearance in the "One in a Million" music video. On May 2, 2025, Blackground Records 2.0 released the single "Gone" by Aaliyah, with former collaborator Tank. The single was released exclusively to the record label's streaming app, BLKStream, but saw a wider release to streaming and digital download sites on August 1, 2025. "Gone" peaked at number one on the Adult R&B Airplay Chart, becoming Aaliyah's first number one on that chart; "Gone" also peaked at number 13 on the R&B/Hip Hop Airplay chart. A 2D music video was released on August 1, 2025, along with the announcement of a "3D holographic experience" provided by the Meta Quest app Soapbox.

== Legacy ==
Aaliyah has been credited for helping to redefine R&B, pop, and hip-hop in the 1990s, "leaving an indelible imprint on the music industry as a whole." According to Billboard, she revolutionized R&B with her sultry mix of pop, soul and hip-hop. Peter Piatkowski from PopMatters stated that "much like Janet Jackson's Control set a template of sorts for dance-pop divas in the 1980s, Aaliyah's patented brand of Black pop, which was a mélange of hip-hop, electropop, and soul, set a standard against which other young urban-pop singers were judged". In a 2001 review of her third album, Ernest Hardy from Rolling Stone claimed that her impact on R&B and pop had been "enormous." Steve Huey of AllMusic wrote that she ranks among the "elite" artists of the R&B genre, as she "played a major role in popularizing the stuttering, futuristic production style that consumed hip-hop and urban soul in the late 1990s." Critic Bruce Britt stated that by combining "schoolgirl charm with urban grit, Aaliyah helped define the teen-oriented sound that has resulted in contemporary pop phenom's like Brandy, Christina Aguilera and Destiny's Child".

Described as one of "R&B's most important artists" during the 1990s, Aaliyah's second studio album, One in a Million, became one of the most influential R&B albums of the decade. Music critic Simon Reynolds cited "Are You That Somebody?" as "the most radical pop single" of 1998. Kelefa Sanneh of The New York Times wrote that rather than being the song's focal point, Aaliyah "knew how to disappear into the music, how to match her voice to the bass line", and consequently "helped change the way popular music sounds; the twitchy, beat-driven songs of Destiny's Child owe a clear debt to 'Are You That Somebody'." Sanneh asserted that by the time of her death in 2001, Aaliyah "had recorded some of the most innovative and influential pop songs of the last five years." Music publication Popdust called her an unlikely queen of the underground for her influence on the underground alternative music scene. The publication also mentioned that the forward-thinking music she made with Timbaland and the experimental music later made by many underground alternative artists were "somewhat cut from the same cloth". While compiling a list of artists that take cues from her, MTV Hive stated that its easy to spot her influence on underground movements like dubstep, strains of indie pop, and lo-fi R&B movements. Erika Ramirez, an associate editor of Billboard, said at the time of Aaliyah's career "there weren't many artists using the kind of soft vocals the ways she was using it, and now you see a lot of artists doing that and finding success". Ramirez argued that her second album One in a Million was "very much ahead of its time, with the bass and electro kind of R&B sounds that they produced", and that the sound, which "really stood out" at the time, was being replicated.

There is a common belief that Aaliyah would have achieved greater career success had it not been for her death. Emil Wilbekin mentioned the deaths of The Notorious B.I.G. and Tupac Shakur in conjunction with hers and added: "Her just-released third album and scheduled role in a sequel to The Matrix could have made her another Janet Jackson or Whitney Houston". Director of Queen of the Damned Michael Rymer said of Aaliyah, "god, that girl could have gone so far" and spoke of her having "such a clarity about what she wanted. Nothing was gonna step in her way. No ego, no nervousness, no manipulation. There was nothing to stop her."

On July 18, 2014, it was announced that Alexandra Shipp would replace Zendaya for the role of Aaliyah for the Lifetime TV biopic movie Aaliyah: The Princess of R&B, which premiered on November 15, 2014. Zendaya drew criticism because people felt that she was too light-skinned and did not greatly resemble Aaliyah. She voiced her strong respect for Aaliyah before dropping out of the project. She explained her choice to withdraw from the film in videos on Instagram. Aaliyah's family has been vocal in their disapproval of the film. Her cousin Jomo Hankerson stated that the family would prefer a "major studio release along the lines" of What's Love Got to Do with It, a biopic based on the life of Tina Turner. Aaliyah's family consulted a lawyer to stop Lifetime from using "any of the music, or any of the photographs and videos" they own, and Hankerson claimed that the TV network "didn't reach out." On August 9, 2014, it was announced that Chattrisse Dolabaille and Izaak Smith had been cast as Aaliyah's collaborators Missy Elliott and Timbaland. Dolabaille and Smith both received criticism for their appearances in comparison with that of Missy Elliott and Timbaland. Despite negative reviews, the film's premiere drew 3.2 million viewers, becoming the second highest rated television movie of 2014.

On August 17, 2021, Atria Books (an imprint of Simon & Schuster) published Kathy Iandoli's Baby Girl: Better Known as Aaliyah, a biography that draws on interviews with Aaliyah's friends, mentors and family, and documents how her career influenced a new generation of artists. It was not authorized by the Haughton family. On August 5, 2022, Beyoncé released "The Queens Remix" to her single "Break My Soul", in which she name-drops Aaliyah, along with other cultural icons. On June 14, 2023, Aaliyah was the subject of the documentary Superstar: Aaliyah, which was broadcast on ABC. The documentary included interviews with Damon Dash, Barry Hankerson, Sevyn Streeter, Will.i.am, Justine Skye, and author Kathy Iandoli, and discussed Aaliyah's life, career and legacy.

In July 2026, an Aaliyah tribute was showcased at the finale of that year's Essence Festival of Culture. Curated by Missy Elliott, the tribute included performances of Aaliyah's best known songs, by Mya, Ryan Destiny, Normani, Chloe Bailey, and Sevyn Streeter. Video tribute messages were also relayed, featuring Ciara, Janet Jackson, Timbaland, Ginuwine, T-Boz, and Monica.

== Achievements ==
Aaliyah sold 8.1 million albums in the United States and an estimated 24 to 32 million albums worldwide. Throughout the years, she has earned several honorific nicknames, including "Princess of R&B", "Pop Princess", and "Queen of Urban Pop", as she "proved she was a muse in her own right". Ernest Hardy of Rolling Stone dubbed her the "undisputed queen of the midtempo come-on". She also has been referred to as a pop and R&B icon for her impact on those genres.

At the 2001 MTV Video Music Awards, Aaliyah was honored by Janet Jackson, Missy Elliott, Timbaland, Ginuwine, and her brother Rashad, all of whom paid tribute to her. Also during 2001, the United States Social Security Administration ranked the name Aaliyah as one of the 100 most popular names for newborn girls. In 2003, she was ranked as one of "The Top 40 Women of the Video Era" in VH1's The Greatest series. Also in 2003, the Entertainment Industry Foundation created the Aaliyah Memorial Fund in her memory to donate money raised to charities she supported. In 2008, she was ranked at number 18 on BET's "Top 25 Dancers of All Time". In December 2009, Billboard ranked her at number 70 on its Top Artists of the Decade, while her album Aaliyah was ranked at number 181 on the magazine's Top 200 Albums of the Decade. In 2010, Billboard listed her as the tenth most successful female R&B artist of the past 25 years, and 27th most successful R&B artist overall. In 2011, Essence ranked her at number 14 on its 50 Most Influential R&B Starts list. In 2012, VH1 ranked her number 48 on their "Greatest Women in Music". In 2014, NME ranked her at number 18 on its 100 most influential artist list. In August 2018, Billboard ranked Aaliyah at number 47 on their Top 60 Female Artists of All-Time list. In 2020, the publication included her on its list of the 100 Greatest Music Video Artists of All Time. Rolling Stone ranked her at number 40 on their 200 Best Singers of All Time list. In September 2023, she was inducted into the National Rhythm & Blues Hall of Fame. In March 2025, Billboard ranked her at number 47 on its Top 100 Women Artists of the 21st Century list. In June 2025, the publication ranked her at number 40 on its the "75 Best R&B Artists of All Time" list.

== Discography ==
=== Studio albums ===
- Age Ain't Nothing but a Number (1994)
- One in a Million (1996)
- Aaliyah (2001)

=== Compilation albums ===
- I Care 4 U (2002)
- Ultimate Aaliyah (2005)

== Filmography ==
List of film and television roles
Year	Title	Medium	Role	Notes
1989	Star Search	TV show	Herself	1 episode
1995; 1997	All That	TV series	Herself (Musical guest)	2 episodes
1997	New York Undercover	TV series	Herself (Musical guest)	Season 3, episode 65: "Fade Out"
2000	Romeo Must Die	Feature film	Trish O'Day	Film debut
2000	The Mim Rose	Short film	Melissa	Written and directed by Rashad Haughton
2002	Queen of the Damned	Feature film	Queen Akasha	Posthumous release

== See also ==
- List of artists who reached number one in the United States
- List of awards and nominations received by Aaliyah
- List of fatalities from aviation accidents

== Bibliography ==
- Brackett, Nathan; Hoard, Christian David (2004). The New Rolling Stone Album Guide: Completely Revised and Updated 4th Edition. Simon & Schuster. ISBN 0-7432-0169-8.
- Farley, John (2002). Aaliyah: More Than a Woman. Simon & Schuster. ISBN 0-7434-5566-5.
- Footman, Tim (2021). Aaliyah. Plexus Publishing Limited. ISBN 9780859657136.
- Iandoli, Kathy (2021). Baby Girl: Better Known as Aaliyah. Atria Books. ISBN 978-1982156862.
- Kenyatta, Kelly (2002). An R&B Princess in Words and Pictures. Amber Books Publishing. ISBN 0-9702224-3-2.
- Simmonds, Jeremy (2008). The Encyclopedia of Dead Rock Stars. Chicago Review Press. ISBN 978-1-55652-754-8.
- Sutherland, William (2005). Aaliyah remembered: her life & the person behind the mystique. Victoria, B.C.: Trafford Publishing. ISBN 1-4120-5062-6. OCLC 59337110.
