= Romeo Must Die =

2000 film by Andrzej Bartkowiak

- Theatrical release poster
- Directed by: Andrzej Bartkowiak
- Screenplay by: Eric Bernt; John Jarrell
- Story by: Mitchell Kapner
- Produced by: Joel Silver; Jim Van Wyck
- Starring: Jet Li; Aaliyah; Isaiah Washington; Russell Wong; DMX; Delroy Lindo
- Cinematography: Glen MacPherson
- Edited by: Derek G. Brechin
- Music by: Stanley Clarke; Timbaland
- Production company: Silver Pictures
- Distributed by: Warner Bros.
- Release date: March 24, 2000
- Running time: 115 minutes
- Country: United States
- Language: English
- Budget: $25 million
- Box office: $91 million

Romeo Must Die is a 2000 American action film directed by Andrzej Bartkowiak in his directorial debut, and features fight choreography by Corey Yuen. The film stars Jet Li, Aaliyah (in her film debut), Isaiah Washington, Russell Wong, DMX, and Delroy Lindo. The plot is loosely related to William Shakespeare's Romeo and Juliet, transplanted to contemporary Oakland with African American and Chinese-American gangs representing the feuding families.

Frustrated by the lack of originality in Hollywood action films, producer Joel Silver built the film around Hong Kong action films. He cast established Hong Kong actor Jet Li following his role in Lethal Weapon 4. R&B singer Aaliyah was cast and performed the soundtrack's lead single "Try Again", which topped the US Billboard Hot 100.

Romeo Must Die was released by Warner Bros. Pictures in the United States on March 24, 2000, where it received mixed reviews from critics, but was a box office success, grossing $91 million against a production budget of $25 million. The film was considered Li and Aaliyah's breakthrough in Hollywood.

== Plot ==
Po Sing is the youngest son of Chinese Triad boss Ch'u Sing, who is accosted by African-Americans in a nightclub owned by Silk in Oakland, California. Po is rescued and admonished by Kai, Ch'u's chief lieutenant. Po leaves the club, but is found murdered the next day. Po's older brother and former police officer, Han Sing, is imprisoned in Hong Kong, and learns of his brother's death and escapes to Oakland to investigate, where Ch'u is engaged in a joint business venture with Isaak O'Day, a real estate developer and gang leader. The two have been acquiring deeds to properties along the waterfront to sell to Vincent Roth, a business magnate who plans to buy a new NFL franchise and build a stadium.

Despite assurances from Ch'u that their partnership remains intact, Isaak fears retribution following Po's death and has his chief lieutenant Mac place security details on his son Colin and his daughter Trish, who refuses to be involved in her father's illegal enterprises. In a chance encounter, Han befriends Trish by helping her ditch her assigned security Maurice and then discovers Po called Trish's clothing store the day before he was killed. At his brother's funeral, Han confronts his estranged father and blames him for failing to protect Po after Han helped them both flee to America to escape Chinese authorities, which resulted in Han's imprisonment. Kai informs Han that Po's death has been the result of the escalating gang war between the Chinese and African-Americans.

Meanwhile, Colin tells his father that he was supposed to have met Po at the club on the night of his murder to discuss information that could end the war. That night, Colin and his girlfriend are murdered by an unseen assailant. Trish and Han work together and realize that Po wanted to show Colin a list of businesses that were either destroyed or being threatened for failing to sell their properties. The two visit one of the remaining businesses on Po's list, but the Chinese owner and his employees have been murdered. After killing the Chinese hitmen responsible, Han questions his father, who deflects suspicion by suggesting Isaak may have used outside contractors. Later, Ch'u is shown ordering the death of several other Triad bosses to acquire their territories. Trish and Han visit the last holdout on Po's list: Silk's nightclub where Po was last seen.

Han and Trish meet with Silk, but Mac kills him for his deed and abducts the two. At a remote location, Han defeats Mac's henchmen led by Maurice and goes to rescue Trish. Ch'u and Isaak meet with Roth to sell him the deeds for the properties they now control. After Ch'u takes a multi-million dollar payment and departs, Isaak refuses his payment, stating that "his compensation" will be in the form of an ownership share of the new franchise. An enraged Mac threatens Isaak to take the deal using Trish as a hostage, revealing that the "gang war" was a ruse he and Ch'u concocted to cover their murder and extortion of businessmen who refused to sign away their properties and admits to killing Colin. In the ensuing shootout, Isaak is wounded while Roth escapes via helicopter. However, Mac shoots Roth's briefcase out of his hand and the deeds scatter into the wind. Han arrives and confronts Mac about Po who reveals that it was the Chinese who killed him, and is about to shoot Han when Trish kills Mac first. Trish waits with her father for an ambulance while Han leaves to find Ch'u.

At the Sing compound, Kai admits he personally killed Po for interfering with Ch'u's dealings with Roth. Han engages Kai in a fist fight, and eventually kills him. Han berates his father for killing Po out of greed and declares that he will leave him to be punished by either the police or the other Triad families. As Han walks away, Ch'u commits suicide. As the police arrive, Han finds Trish waiting for him outside and they embrace, with the two walking away together.

== Cast ==
- Jet Li as Han Sing
  - Jonross Fong as Young Han Sing
- Aaliyah as Trish O'Day
- Isaiah Washington as Mac
- Russell Wong as Kai
- DMX as "Silk"
- Delroy Lindo as Isaak O'Day
- DB Woodside as Colin O'Day
- Henry O as Ch'u Sing
- Anthony Anderson as Maurice
- Edoardo Ballerini as Vince Roth
- Françoise Yip as Meriana Sing, Motorcycle Fighter
- Terry Chen as Kung
- Tseng Chang as Victor Ho
- Jon Kit Lee as Po Sing
  - Ryan Jefferson Lowe as Young Po Sing
- Matthew Harrison as Dave
- Alvin Sanders as Calvin
- Manoj Sood as Akbar

== Production ==
During the late 1990s, the producer Joel Silver became annoyed that he did not see anything fresh or original in American action films. For inspiration, he turned to Hong Kong action cinema, where Jet Li was an established movie star. In addition to the influence of Hong Kong martial arts films, the production team also introduced a new visual effect technique: the presentation of martial arts fighting in X-ray vision. They initially experimented with it for a single fight scene with Jet Li and tested it in front of an American audience, which gave an overwhelmingly positive response, before using it in more action scenes throughout the film.

The film's setting is Oakland, California, but other than a few establishing shots, film production was entirely in Vancouver, British Columbia. Principal photography began on May 3, 1999, and ended on July 23, 1999. Filming locations included Gastown, Grandview–Woodland, Vanier Park, Chinatown, Versatile Pacific Shipyards, and the Dr. Sun Yat-Sen Classical Chinese Garden.

According to the documentary The Slanted Screen, Han and Trish were supposed to have a kissing scene, which explains the title of Romeo, but this did not test well with an urban audience. Jet Li stated on his personal website that they had filmed both versions of the scene (with kiss and without), and decided to use the latter because it would be "somewhat strange and awkward" for Han to have witnessed his father's suicide and then to come out and kiss someone.

== Release ==
Romeo Must Die debuted at #2 at the U.S. box office behind Erin Brockovich, which had come out a week earlier. The film was produced with a budget of US$25 million. In North America, Romeo Must Die earned $18,014,503 (2,641 theaters, $6,821 per screen average) in its opening weekend. Romeo Must Die's total North American gross is $55,973,336. The film's worldwide box office gross is $91,036,760.

It was released in the United States on DVD on August 1, 2000, and on Blu-ray on August 14, 2012. Warner shipped more than 500,000 units of the title on DVD.

== Critical reception ==
The film has a 32% approval rating from 94 reviews on Rotten Tomatoes, a review aggregator; the critical consensus reads: "In his second Hollywood movie, Jet Li impresses. Unfortunately, when he's not on screen, the movie slows to a crawl. Though there's some spark between Jet and Aaliyah, there isn't any threat of a fire. And as impressive as the action sequences are, some critics feel they are over-edited." Metacritic, which uses a weighted average, assigned the film a score of 52 out of 100, based on 27 critics, indicating "mixed or average" reviews.

Elvis Mitchell of The New York Times called the movie "dreary" but said it was bound to be a hit due to its combination of martial arts action and hip hop. Writing for the San Francisco Chronicle, Bob Graham likened it to The Matrix, describing it as a "cross-cultural kung fu extravaganza" that shines during Li's stunts. In his review for the Chicago Tribune, Rene Rodriguez said the film is "needlessly convoluted" and should not have added special effects on top of Li's stunts, which he said makes them seem less impressive because of the artificiality. Roger Ebert rated the film 1.5/4 stars and also criticized the use of computer-generated special effects in a martial arts film, saying that it "misses the point" of having audiences be impressed by realistic stunts. Aaliyah received praise for her role.

== Soundtrack ==
Romeo Must Die: The Album was released on March 28, 2000, through Blackground/Virgin Records in association with Warner Bros. (who helped co-financed the soundtrack). Composed of hip hop and R&B music, it features contributions from film star Aaliyah, who appears on four songs and served as one of executive producers on the soundtrack album. Three singles were released from the album: "Try Again", "Come Back in One Piece" and "We At It Again".

== See also ==
- Jet Li filmography
- Aaliyah filmography
