= Soundbombing II =

1999 compilation album by Rawkus Records

Compilation album by Rawkus Records
- Released: May 18, 1999
- Recorded: 1998–1999
- Genre: Hip-hop
- Length: 71:33
- Label: Rawkus
- Producers: Beat Junkies; Da Beatminerz; DJ Mighty Mi; Lee Stone; Capital the Crimelord; Pos Plug Won; DJ Spinna; Hi-Tek; Thirstin Howl III; Smitty Steve Bosston; El-P; Diamond D; Nick Wiz

Rawkus Records chronology
| Lyricist Lounge, Volume One (1998) | Soundbombing II (1999) | Lyricist Lounge 2 (2000) |

Soundbombing II is the second installment in Rawkus Records' Soundbombing compilation series. It was released by the label on May 18, 1999, following the 1997 original album. Mixed by DJ Babu and J Rocc of Beat Junkies, the album included tracks from a variety of artists, both Rawkus' signees and popular artists from other labels, including Mos Def, Talib Kweli, Eminem, Common, Pharoahe Monch, the High & Mighty, Cocoa Brovaz, R.A. the Rugged Man, Sadat X, Grand Puba, Diamond D, and Company Flow.

In the late 1990s, Rawkus Records established itself as a prominent label in underground hip-hop, with successful releases including Company Flow's Funcrusher Plus (1997), Mos Def & Talib Kweli Are Black Star (1998), and the original Soundbombing album. DJ Babu and J Rocc of Beat Junkies were approached by Rawkus' founders Brian Brater and Jarret Myer to help mix the sequel album, which was recorded throughout 1998 to 1999.

Supported by a strong promotional campaign, Soundbombing II performed significantly better commercially than other underground hip-hop albums, peaking at number 30 on the US Billboard 200 and number six on the US Top R&B/Hip-Hop Albums chart. The album's lead single, "One-Nine-Nine-Nine", performed on the US Bubbling Under Hot 100 Singles, Hot R&B/Hip-Hop Songs, and Hot Rap Songs charts.

Upon its release, Soundbombing II received widespread acclaim from music critics. In the years since its release, the album achieved classic status, with music critics claiming that it perfectly captured the late 1990s era in underground hip-hop. Soundbombing II was named by several publications as one of the best hip-hop albums of all time.

== Background and development ==
By the late 1990s, Rawkus Records had established itself in the underground hip-hop community, with releases such as Company Flow's Funcrusher Plus (1997), Mos Def & Talib Kweli Are Black Star (1998), and the first Soundbombing (1997) compilation album. Following the success of the label's albums, Rawkus signed a few more artists and planned to release several albums in 1999. Soundbombing II was meant to be the foundation for the future releases.

In 1998, DJ Babu and J Rocc of Beat Junkies worked in a record store in Los Angeles. Rawkus artists Mos Def and Talib Kweli frequently visited the store. Eventually, Rawkus' founders Brian Brater and Jarret Myer approached Babu and J Rocc, asking them to help with the mixing of Soundbombing II. The album was recorded throughout 1998 to 1999.

== Music and lyrics ==
=== Overview ===
Soundbombing II is generally considered a hip-hop compilation album with an estimated length of 77 minutes and a half. The album features many hip-hop artists, including Mos Def, Talib Kweli, Eminem, Common, Pharoahe Monch, the High & Mighty, Cocoa Brovaz, R.A. the Rugged Man, Sadat X, Grand Puba, Diamond D, and Company Flow. The project features multiple producers, with Hi-Tek making the most appearances on four tracks. The majority of the album was recorded and mixed at various music studios in New York, excluding one credited from New Jersey. Soundbombing II was sequenced by Babu and J Rocc create a cohesive progression in pacing and rhythm, with the album gradually shifting from the more intense tone of its opening tracks toward more eccentric interpretations of the same musical styles. Most of the intros were produced by the Beat Junkies.

=== Tracks 1–11 ===
The album opens with "Any Man", which features Eminem rapping cartoon-like verses mixed with chaos and an "elastic rhyming style". The track previously circulated as a demo and some of the lyrics were included in Eminem's radio freestyles before its official release. He would later reference his appearance on "Stan" (2000), where the titular fan's obsession includes knowing about "the shit you did with Rawkus." On "B-Boy Document 99", Mighty Mi "whips himself into a frenzy", rapping a verse that serves as a "de facto mission" statement for Rawkus Records and the independent hip-hop movement it sought to represent, with him declaring "I'm I-N-D-E-P-E-N-D-E-N-T". The track also features additional appearances from Mos Def and Skillz. Not "always righteous", the compilation would lean into self-parody with "WWII" as Pharoahe Monch opens the track with "Cleverly beginnin’ ‘em with synonyms when I went in with homonyms", with an appearance by Shabaam Sahdeeq.

"Stanley Kubrick" is built on a "punishing slink" provided by Capital the Crime Lord, with the track sounding like "what might have happened if Ghostface Killah had graduated from Harvard". Following an interlude featuring J-Live and Prince Paul, "Crosstown Beef" features uncredited appearances from Mos Def and his younger brother DCQ telling a story about a shooting outside a nightclub "full of uncommon texture", including the description of the parking garage and hue of the tints on a car’s windows. "7XL" emphasizes DJ Spinna's "glitchy fugue" and the use of a "laid-back head knocker for a beat that makes good on the promise." In addition, Sir Menelik, Sadat X, and Grand Puba appear on the track.

=== Tracks 12–27 ===
"Chaos" slides with a textured beat consisting of muted horns that overlap with Hi-Tek's drum beat. On the track, Bahamadia flexes her lyrical ability with a "whispery monotone" style, while Talib Kweli of Reflection Eternal highlights his tension with lyrics including "take that bass out your voice, you speak to me in treble". "Soundbombing", featuring Tash and Dilated Peoples, is described by RapReviews as an interlude "longer than the track that follows it", considering that the following track "Brooklyn Hard Rock" lasts almost a minute and a half. Thirstin Howl III's rapping on the latter track is described by Pitchfork's Paul A. Thompson as if each line concludes with an exclamation point.

Pharoahe Monch highlights the album with "Mayor", where he raps with his "breathless yarn" from the perspective of a cop who is close to a mayor before assassinating him. The track features a Lamont Dozier sample that is later used by RZA for Ghostface Killah's "Saturday Nite" (2000). Company Flow member El-P's verse on "Patriotism", which criticizes NATO and puppet governments, is described by Thompson as something that "gets passed around high schools like a sort of dial-up Rosetta Stone". Following an intro from Q-Tip, the lead single "One-Nine-Nine-Nine" features a collaboration between Common and Sadat X on a restrained midtempo beat, where the former uses introspective imagery as a reflection on artistic identity. The chorus of the track repeats through a scratched Chuck D sample.

On "When It Pours It Rains", Diamond D transforms a melancholic excerpt from the Rocky score into a "wonderfully, typically understated bounce." "Next Universe" marks Mos Def's third appearance. Mos Def's flow on the track emphasizes a "tight blend of old school feel with new school skills that shines." "Every Rhyme I Write" features the Cocoa Brovaz and another appearance from Shabaam Sahdeeq on a "razor sharp beat" by Nick Wiz, with a sample of "Shook Ones Pt. II" (1995) by Mobb Deep. Reflection Eternal's "On Mission" closes the album in "respectable fashion."

== Promotion and release ==
Funded by James Murdoch, the son of billionaire Rupert Murdoch and a university friend of the label's founders, Rawkus was able to afford more promotion for the album than other underground hip-hop labels. The label installed full-page ads in music publications and released the single "One-Nine-Nine-Nine" featuring Common, Sadat X, and Talib Kweli. Its music video was in rotation on BET and MTV, and the single itself performed commercially well for an independent single, peaking at number ten on Bubbling Under Hot 100 Singles, number 41 on Hot R&B/Hip-Hop Songs chart, and number four on Hot Rap Songs. The label later distributed a promotional snippet mixtape credited to the Beat Junkies, yielding beyond what underground hip-hop labels did in promotion.

Soundbombing II was released on May 18, 1999, by Rawkus Records, highlighted by the popularity of "One-Nine-Nine-Nine", "Any Man" by Eminem, "B-Boy Document 99" by the High & Mighty, and "Patriotism" by Company Flow. Around its release, BET's Rap City aired a special episode dedicated on the album. With all the promotion, Soundbombing II sold far greater than the label expected. On June 5, the album debuted and peaked at number 30 on the Billboard 200 and number six on the US Top R&B/Hip-Hop Albums chart. The album's commercial success boosted Rawkus Records' popularity, releasing Company Flow's Little Johnny from the Hospitul, the High & Mighty's Home Field Advantage, Mos Def's Black on Both Sides, and Pharoahe Monch's Internal Affairs that year, helping raise the label's budget to create The Lyricist Lounge Show, a sketch comedy show debuted by MTV in early 2000.

== Critical reception ==
Professional ratings
Review scores
| Source | Rating |
|---|---|
| AllMusic | 4/5 stars |
| Entertainment Weekly | A− |
| The Independent | 4/5 stars |
| Pitchfork | 8.6/10 |
| RapReviews | 9/10 |
| Rolling Stone | 4/5 stars |
| Spin | 7/10 |
| The Village Voice | A− |

Soundbombing II was praised by music critics. Matt Conaway of AllMusic called the album a "quintessential Rawkus project", commending the album's accessibility for both underground and mainstream listeners, while simultaneously criticizing Beat Junkies' mixing. The A.V. Club's Nathan Rabin applauded the album for being an "exceptional project", recognizing the mid-album intros as a minor flaw. Writing for Entertainment Weekly, Will Hermes praised DJ Babu and J Rocc, calling them "[t]urntable surgeons", and described Soundbombing II as forward-looking.

Tim Perry of The Independent called the album an improvement over the original Soundbombing and proclaimed it the soundtrack of 1999's summer. RapReviews also described it as an improvement over the original, claiming that the album's lyrics are some of the best lyrics of the year, and that "every other compilation out there pales in comparison". Matt Diehl of Rolling Stone named Soundbombing II the year's most vital hip-hop compilation and compared it to a rocket that will take underground hip-hop to "overground".

In a review for Spin magazine, Neil Drumming complimented the album for its "high concepts", while criticizing the "go-nowhere battle hymns". The Wire magazine praised Soundbombing II, calling it an "invaluable [snapshot] of an area of music currently overflowing with ideas", highlighting the album's transformation into "one long funk-flow". Vibe magazine's author Noah Callahan-Bever applauded the album, noting the evolution of the label's artists, who went "from raw and unpolished to solid, skilled artists poised to give chart-topping rappers a serious run for their money".

== Legacy ==
Since its release, Soundbombing II has continued to rise in popularity. Matt Welty of Complex magazine called it an "early 2000s essential", while Pitchfork's Jeff Weiss said that the album "banged incessantly in dorm rooms across America and England". Over the years, the album attained a classic status. Tom Breihan of Stereogum said that Soundbombing II "codified the underground rap universe". HipHopDX named it "possibly the best full-bodied encapsulation of the era".

Several publications placed Soundbombing II on their lists of the best albums. Rolling Stone placed it at number 181 on their list of the 200 greatest hip-hop albums of all time, naming it "the greatest hip-hop compilation ever". Fact magazine placed Soundbombing II at number eight on its list of "the 100 best indie hip-hop records ever made", stating that it was a "lesson in the art and science of putting together mixtapes" and "the best and most definitive compilation of the era".

Rapper Danny Brown named Soundbombing II as one of his favorite albums, saying it had a major influence on him, as he wanted to rap just as skillfully as the rappers on the album and that it was the first time he saw that "the better rappers could be guys [he] didn't see on MTV all the time". Among others who have praised the album are actor Jonah Hill and comedian Eric André.

== Track listing ==
| No. | Title | Writer(s) | Producer(s) | Length |
|---|---|---|---|---|
| 1. | "Intro" | | | 1:58 |
| 2. | "Any Man" (Intro) | | Beat Junkies | 1:03 |
| 3. | "Any Man" (Eminem) | Marshall Mathers, Walter Dewgarde | Da Beatminerz | 2:53 |
| 4. | "B-Boy Document '99" (The High & Mighty, Mos Def and Skillz) | Dante Smith, Donnie Lewis, Eric Meltzer, Milo Berger | DJ Mighty Mi | 4:07 |
| 5. | "WWIII" (Intro) | | Beat Junkies | 1:01 |
| 6. | "WWIII" (Shabaam Sahdeeq and Pharoahe Monch) | Lee Stone, Marcus Vialva, Troy Jamerson | Lee Stone | 3:29 |
| 7. | "Stanley Kubrick" (R.A. the Rugged Man) | Ryan Thorburn | Capital the Crime Lord | 3:32 |
| 8. | "A Message from J-Live & Prince Paul" (Interlude) | | | 0:49 |
| 9. | "Crosstown Beef" (Intro) | | Beat Junkies, Kid Capri | 0:48 |
| 10. | "Crosstown Beef" (Medina Green) | Denard Smith, K. M. Allah, W. Johnson, Andre Williams, Dante Smith, Kelvin Mercer | Pos Plug Won | 4:30 |
| 11. | "7XL" (Intro) | | Beat Junkies, Pete Rock, Marley Marl | 0:57 |
| 12. | "7XL" (Sir Menelik, Sadat X and Grand Puba) | Derek Murphy, Maxwell Dixon, Phillip Collington, Vince Williams | DJ Spinna | 3:50 |
| 13. | "Chaos" (Reflection Eternal and Bahamadia) | Antonia Reed, Talib Greene, Tony Cottrell | Hi-Tek | 4:12 |
| 14. | "Soundbombing" (Tash and Dilated Peoples) | | | 3:04 |
| 15. | "Brooklyn Hard Rock" (Thirstin Howl III) | L. Smith, Victor DeJesus | Thirstin Howl III, Smitty Steve Bosston | 1:25 |
| 16. | "Mayor" (Pharoahe Monch) | Stone, Jamerson | Lee Stone | 3:28 |
| 17. | "Patriotism" (Intro) | | Beat Junkies | 0:38 |
| 18. | "Patriotism" (Company Flow) | Jaime Meline, Leonard Smythe | El-P | 5:08 |
| 19. | "1-9-9-9" (Intro) | | Beat Junkies, Q-Tip | 1:22 |
| 20. | "1-9-9-9" (Common and Sadat X) | Murphy, Lonnie Lynn, Cottrell | Hi-Tek | 4:10 |
| 21. | "When It Pours It Rains" (Diamond D) | Joseph Kirkland, John Dough | Diamond D | 2:03 |
| 22. | "A Message from the Beat Junkies" (Interlude) | | Beat Junkies | 1:07 |
| 23. | "Next Universe" (Mos Def) | Dante Smith, Cottrell | Hi-Tek | 3:06 |
| 24. | "Every Rhyme I Write" (Intro) | | Beat Junkies | 0:43 |
| 25. | "Every Rhyme I Write" (Shabaam Sahdeeq and Cocoa Brovaz) | Darrell Yates, Vialva, Nick Loizides, Tekomin Williams | Nick Wiz | 3:56 |
| 26. | "On Mission" (Reflection Eternal) | Greene, Cottrell | Hi-Tek | 4:16 |
| 27. | "Outro" | | | 3:58 |
| Total length: | | | | 71:33 |

== Credits and personnel ==
Credits are adapted from the album's liner notes.

Samples

- "B-Boy Document 99" features a sample from "Polarized" as performed by Joe Thomas.
- "Every Rhyme I Write" features a sample from "Shook Ones, Pt. II" as performed by Mobb Deep.

Studios

- Recorded at D&D Studios, New York City, NY (3–4, 20)
- Mixed at the Cutting Room, New York City (4)
- Recorded at Grandma Hands Studio, Jamaica, NY (6, 16)
- Mixed (6, 12, 23) and recorded (23) at Sony Studios, New York City, NY
- Recorded and mixed at Rock N Reel Studios, Northport, NY (7)
- Recorded at Firehouse Studios, New York City, NY (12)
- Recorded at Dollar Cab Lab, Flatbush, NY (15)
- Recorded and mixed at Ozone Studios, New York City, NY (18)
- Recorded at Mirror Image Studios, New York City NY (20)
- Recorded at The Cella, Teaneck, NJ (25)
- Recorded and mixed at Platinum Island, New York City, NY (26)

Musicians

- Victor DeJesus – scratches (15)
- Leonard Smythe – scratches (18)
- Tony Cottrell – scratches (20, 26)
- Etch A Sketch – scratches (23)
- DJ Massey – scratches (25)

Technicians

- Kieran Walsh – engineer (4)
- Ken – mixing engineer (4)
- Tony Sinolis – mixing engineer (6, 16)
- Lee Stone – recording engineer (6, 16)
- David Greenberg – recording, mixing engineer (7)
- Phillip Collington – mixing engineer (12)
- Victor DeJesus – mixing engineer (15)
- Law – recording engineer (15)
- James Meline – mixing engineer (18)
- Troy Hightower – mixing engineer (20)
- Dave Kennedy – recording, mixing engineer (23)
- Nick Loizides – recording, mixing engineer (25)
- Jeff Davidson – engineering (Pro Tools) (25)
- Carlisle Young – recording, mixing engineer (26)

Designers

- Van Shun Brown – cover illustrations
- John Semprit – digital coloring
- Franck Khalfoun – photography
- Nobody – art direction, design, layout
- Phase2 – artist
- One9 – artist
- East – artist
- Dome – artist
- Vulcan – artist
- Case2 – artist
- Sento – artist

== Charts ==
=== Album ===
Chart performance for Soundbombing II
| Chart (1999) | Peak position |
|---|---|
| US Billboard 200 | 30 |
| US Top R&B/Hip-Hop Albums (Billboard) | 6 |

=== Singles ===
Chart performance for "One-Nine-Nine-Nine"
| Chart (1999) | Peak position |
|---|---|
| US Bubbling Under Hot 100 (Billboard) | 10 |
| US Hot R&B/Hip-Hop Songs (Billboard) | 41 |
| US Hot Rap Songs (Billboard) | 4 |
