= Best of Decade I: 1995–2005 =

Best of Decade I: 1995-2005

Greatest hits album by Rawkus Records
- Released: December 13, 2005
- Genre: Hip-hop
- Label: Geffen/Rawkus Records
- Producer: Kanye West; Ayatollah; Hi-Tek; Rockwilder; Minnesota; Mike Heron; Shawn J. Period; David Kennedy; DJ Mighty Mi

Rawkus Records chronology
Soundbombing III (2002)	Best of Decade I: 1995-2005 (2005)

Professional ratings
Review scores
Source	Rating
Allmusic	link
RapReviews.com	9/10 link

Best of Decade I: 1995–2005 is a compilation album, featuring singles released on Rawkus Records during their first ten years. The compilation revolves around the label's star Mos Def, who appears on eight of the fifteen tracks. There is one previously unreleased track featured on the album, which is the Mos Def song "Beef".

The album features one track from the Soundbombing compilation, one track from the Lyricist Lounge, Volume One compilation, two tracks from the Soundbombing 2 compilation, one track from the Lyricist Lounge 2 compilation, one track from the Soundbombing III compilation, two tracks from Mos Def & Talib Kweli's Black Star album, two tracks from Mos Def's Black on Both Sides album, one track from Big L's The Big Picture album, one track from Reflection Eternal's Train of Thought album, one track from Hi-Tek's Hi-Teknology album, and one track from Talib Kweli's Quality album.

== Track listing ==
#	Title	Producer(s)	Performer (s)	Original Album
1	"Get By"	Kanye West	Talib Kweli	Quality
2	"Ms. Fat Booty"	Ayatollah	Mos Def	Black on Both Sides
3	"Respiration"	Hi-Tek	Mos Def & Talib Kweli, Common	Mos Def and Talib Kweli are Black Star
4	"The Life"	Ayatollah	Styles P, Pharoahe Monch	Soundbombing III
5	"Oh No"	Rockwilder	Mos Def, Pharoahe Monch, Nate Dogg	Lyricist Lounge 2
6	"The Blast"	Hi-Tek	Talib Kweli & Hi-Tek, Vinia Mojica	Train of Thought
7	"Definition"	Hi-Tek	Mos Def & Talib Kweli	Mos Def and Talib Kweli are Black Star
8	"Beef"	Minnesota	Mos Def	Previously Unreleased
9	"Flamboyant"	Mike Heron	Big L	The Big Picture
10	"Universal Magnetic"	Shawn J. Period	Mos Def	Soundbombing
11	"Umi Says"	Mos Def, David Kennedy	Mos Def	Black on Both Sides
12	"1-9-9-9"	Hi-Tek	Common, Sadat X	Soundbombing 2
13	"The Sun God"	Hi-Tek	Hi-Tek, Common, Vinia Mojica	Hi-Teknology
14	"Body Rock"	Shawn J. Period	Mos Def, Q-Tip, Tash	Lyricist Lounge, Volume One
15	"B-Boy Document '99"	DJ Mighty Mi	High & Mighty, Mos Def, Skillz	Soundbombing 2

== Singles Chart Positions ==
Year	Song	Chart positions			
Year	Song	Billboard Hot 100	Hot R&B/Hip-Hop Singles & Tracks	Hot Rap Singles	Hot Dance Music/Maxi-Singles Sales
1998	"Body Rock"	-	#65	#29	#11
1998	"Definition"	#60	#31	#3	-
1999	"Respiration"	-	#54	#6	-
1999	"Ms. Fat Booty"	-	#54	#20	-
1999	"1-9-9-9"	-	#41	#4	-
1999	"B-Boy Document '99"	-	#63	#7	-
2000	"Flamboyant"	-	#39	#1	-
2000	"Oh No"	#83	#22	#1	#38
2001	"The Blast"	-	#48	#2	-
2001	"The Sun God"	-	#77	-	-
2002	"The Life"	-	#66	-	-
2002	"Get By"	#77	#29	#16	-
