= Lyricist Lounge, Volume One =

Compilation album by various artists
- Released: May 5, 1998
- Recorded: 1997−1998
- Studio: Various: Temple of Soul (New York City); Firehouse (New York City); The Chop Shop (New Jersey); Animation Sound (New York City); Ozone (New York City); Soundtrack (New York City); Poke's Crib (Staten Island); Animal Tracks (Brooklyn); D's House (Brooklyn); Platinum Island (New York City); Unique (New York City); Mark Dann (New York City); Rawkus (New York City); The Red October Chemical Storage Facility (Los Angeles); Circus (Brooklyn); Westlake Audio (Los Angeles)
- Genre: Hip-hop
- Length: 2:13:47
- Label: Rawkus Records
- Producer: Anthony Marshall (exec.); Danny Castro (exec.); Perry Landesberg (exec.); 88-Keys; Charlemagne; Curt Gowdy; Cut Chemist; Derrick Trotman; DJ Nu-Mark; DJ Scratch; El-P; Ge-Ology; G.M.; Hi-Tek; Keith Horne; Kenny Diaz; Megahertz; Native Sun; Nottz; Shawn J. Period; Saul Williams; Stix Bones; V.I.C.; Will Tell

Various artists chronology
| Soundbombing (1997) | Lyricist Lounge, Volume One (1998) | Soundbombing II (1999) |

Singles from Lyricist Lounge, Volume One
- 1. "Body Rock" Released: March 3, 1998; 2. "C.I.A. (Criminals In Action)" Released: November 10, 1998

Professional ratings
Review scores
| Source | Rating |
|---|---|
| AllMusic | 4/5 stars |
| Robert Christgau | (1-star Honorable Mention) |
| The Source | 3.5/5 stars |

Lyricist Lounge, Volume One is the second hip-hop compilation album by American record label Rawkus Records. The double-disc was released on May 5, 1998, as the first installment of the Lyricist Lounge album series, based on New York's Lyricist Lounge showcases.

Recording sessions took place at Temple of Soul, Firehouse Studios, at Animation Sound, at Ozone Studios, at Soundtrack Studios, at Poke's Crib, at Animal Tracks Studios, at D's House, at Platinum Island Studios, at Unique Studios, at Mark Dann Recording Studios, at Rawkus Studios and at Circus Studios in New York City, at The Chop Shop in New Jersey, at the Red October Chemical Storage Facility in Los Angeles with additional recording at Westlake Audio.

Production was handled by Shawn J Period, 88-Keys, Kenny Diaz, Will Tell, Charlemagne, Curt Cowdy, Cut Chemist, Derrick Trotman, DJ Nu-Mark, DJ Scratch, El-P, Ge-Ology, G.M., Hi-Tek, Keith Horne, Megahertz, Native Sun, Nottz, Saul Williams, Stix Bones and V.I.C., with Danny Castro, Ant Marshall and Perry Landsberg serving as executive producers.

It features contributions from Bahamadia, Black Thought, Common, Company Flow, De La Soul, Jurassic 5, Kool Keith, KRS-One, Mos Def, Natural Elements, O.C., Pharoahe Monch, Punchline, Q-Tip, Rah Digga, Ras Kass, Saul Williams, Shabaam Sahdeeq, Talib Kweli, Tash, The Last Emperor, Thirstin Howl III, Wordsworth and Zack de la Rocha among others.

The album peaked at number 167 on the Billboard 200 and 52 on the Top R&B Albums chart in the United States. It was preceded by two singles: "Body Rock" and "C.I.A. (Criminals In Action)". "Body Rock" peaked at #15 on the Bubbling Under Hot 100 chart, #65 on the Hot R&B/Hip-Hop Songs chart, #29 on the Hot Rap Songs chart, and #11 on the Dance Singles Sales chart. "C.I.A. (Criminals In Action)" peaked at #33 on the Hot Rap Songs chart.

== Track listing ==
Disc 1: De La Soul Hosts the Lyricist Lounge at Tramps
| No. | Title | Writer(s) | Producer(s) | Length |
|---|---|---|---|---|
| 1. | "Street Promoters (Skit)" (performed by WiseGuy) | G. Thomas; Anthony Marshall; Danny Castro | | 0:44 |
| 2. | "Intro" (performed by De La Soul) | Kelvin Mercer; David Jude Jolicoeur; Charles Njapa | 88-Keys | 1:41 |
| 3. | "Bring Hip Hop Back" (performed by Cipher Complete) | Fred Neal Jr.; Rodney Wood; Dorsey Wesley | Megahertz | 3:55 |
| 4. | "Keep Pouring" (performed by Diaz Brothers, Matrix and A-Butta) | Kenny Diaz; C. Marshall; Anthony Cruz | Kenny Diaz | 5:29 |
| 5. | "Blood" (performed by Sarah Jones) | Sarah Jones; Franklin Brown; M. Jengkens | Stix Bones; Native Sun | 5:13 |
| 6. | "Body Rock" (performed by Mos Def, Q-Tip and Tash) | Dante Smith; Kamaal Fareed; Rico Smith; Shawn M. Jones | Shawn J Period | 5:11 |
| 7. | "Bathroom Cipher" (performed by Hazadus, J-Treds, Thirstin Howl III, Kwest tha Madd Ladd and I.G. Off) | F. Swinton; Jason Hill; Victor DeJesus; Thomas St. John; Christopher McKenzie; Njapa | 88-Keys | 4:24 |
| 8. | "Da Cipher" (performed by Punchline and Wordsworth) | Rashaan Truell; Vinson Johnson; Richard Pimentel | Curt Gowdy | 4:09 |
| 9. | "Famous Last Words" (performed by Word A' Mouth) | Ismael Diaz; Miguel Herstein; William Tell | Will Tell | 5:05 |
| 10. | "No Matter" (performed by Prime) | E. Louis; Derrick Trotman | Derrick Trotman | 5:20 |
| 11. | "Action Guaranteed" (performed by O.C. and Ras Kass) | Omar Credle; John Austin; S. Jones | Shawn J Period | 5:24 |
| 12. | "All in My Own" (performed by Mike Zoot) | Michael Whyte; S. Jones | Shawn J Period | 7:33 |
| 13. | "The Phone Call (Skit)" (performed by WiseGuy and Wordsmith) | G. Thomas; V. Johnson | | 1:03 |
| 14. | "Live from the D.J. Stretch Armstrong Show with Your Host Bobbito 'The Barber'" (performed by Black Thought, Common, Pharoahe Monch and Absolute) | Tarik Collins; Lonnie Lynn; Troy Jamerson; A. Flores; Victor Padilla; S. Jones | V.I.C.; Shawn J Period | 10:09 |

Disc 2: Kool Keith and Sir Menelik Host the Lyricist Lounge "Live" at Shea Stadium
| No. | Title | Writer(s) | Producer(s) | Length |
|---|---|---|---|---|
| 15. | "Ohm" (performed by Saul Williams) | Saul Williams; M. Jengkens | Saul Williams; Native Sun (co.) | 3:28 |
| 16. | "Intro" (performed by Kool Keith, Sir Menelik and Survival Soundz) | Keith Thornton; Phillip Collington; James Knight; Mario Moorehead; Tesfa Zawdie; Andrew Joseph | | 1:35 |
| 17. | "Mayday" (performed by Natural Elements) | Cruz; Agu Obiakor; Len Lesmond; Henri Charlemagne | Charlemagne | 5:38 |
| 18. | "The Manifesto" (performed by Reflection Eternal) | Talib Greene; Tony Cottrell | Hi-Tek | 5:44 |
| 19. | "Be OK" (performed by Bahamadia and Rah Digga) | Antonia Reed; Rashia Fisher; George Spivey | DJ Scratch | 5:44 |
| 20. | "Lyrics" (performed by A.L.) | Alex Mosquera; K. Diaz | Kenny Diaz | 3:47 |
| 21. | "Outside the Lounge" (performed by Talib Kweli, Shabaam Sahdeeq, WiseGuy, Word A' Mouth and Lil' Sci) | Greene; Marcus Vialva; G. Thomas; Herstein; I. Diaz; John Robinson; Tell | Will Tell | 7:07 |
| 22. | "Holy Water" (performed by Lord Have Mercy and D.V. Alias Khrist) | Wayne Notise; Kenneth Scranton; Dominick Lamb | Nottz | 6:23 |
| 23. | "Jayou" (performed by Jurassic 5) | Dante Givens; Marc Stuart; Charles Stewart; Courtenay Henderson; Mark Potsic; Lucas Macfadden | DJ Nu-Mark; Cut Chemist | 4:04 |
| 24. | "C.I.A. (Criminals in Action)" (performed by Zack de la Rocha, KRS-One and The Last Emperor) | Zacharias de la Rocha; Lawrence Parker; Jamal Gray; Keith Horne | Keith Horne | 5:20 |
| 25. | "Society" (performed by Problemz) | C. Bullock; S. Pile; Roy Ayers; Donna Hathaway | G.M. | 5:16 |
| 26. | "Weight" (performed by Indelible MC's: Company Flow, The Juggaknots and J-Treds) | Justin Ingleton; Paul Anthony Smith; Peridot A.C. Smith; Hill; Jaime Meline; Leonard Smythe | El-P; Mr. Len (co.) | 6:13 |
| 27. | "After the Show" (performed by Wordsmith, Rise, Punchline, Jedi and A.L.) | V. Johnson; Jean Myrthil; Truell; M. Duffoo; Mosquera; Gerard Young | Ge-Ology | 8:08 |
| Total length: | | | | 2:13:47 |

Notes

- Track 11 features additional vocals by Kimberly Diamonds
- Track 12 features additional vocals by Shawn J Period
- Track 17 features additional vocals by Ka
- Track 24 features scratches by DJ Spinbad and DJ Daze
- Track 25 features additional vocals by Nicole Willis

Sample credits

- Track 3 contains a sample of "One Day" written by Jeru the Damaja and DJ Premier
- Track 24 contains excerpts from "La Murga Pana Mena" written by Perez and Willie Colón as performed by Cal Tjader
- Track 25 contains an interpolation of "Our Ages Our Hearts"

== Charts ==
| Chart (1998) | Peak position |
|---|---|
| US Billboard 200 | 167 |
| US Top R&B Albums (Billboard) | 52 |

=== Singles chart positions ===
| Year | Song | Chart positions | | | |
| Year | Song | US Hot 100 | US R&B | US Rap | US Dance |
|---|---|---|---|---|---|
| 1998 | "Body Rock" | 115 | 65 | 29 | 11 |
| 1998 | "C.I.A. (Criminals In Action)" | — | — | 33 | — |
