= Hip Hop for Respect =

EP by various artists
- Released: April 25, 2000
- Recorded: April 23, 1999
- Studio: Sony Music Studios (New York, NY); Master Cutting Room (New York, NY)
- Genre: Hip hop
- Length: 36:55
- Label: Rawkus
- Producer: 88-Keys; Mr. Khaliyl; Organized Noize

Professional ratings
Review scores
Source	Rating
AllMusic	4/5 stars

Hip Hop for Respect is a benefit maxi-single brought together by American hip hop duo Black Star to speak out against police brutality after four New York City Police Department officers murdered West African immigrant Amadou Diallo by firing 41 shots at the unarmed man. The project was released on April 25, 2000, through Rawkus Records.

Recording sessions took place at Sony Music Studios and Master Cutting Room in New York City. Production was handled by Organized Noize, Mr. Khaliyl and 88-Keys, with Devin Roberson, Mos Def and Talib Kweli serving as executive producers.

Beside Mos Def and Talib Kweli, it features an ensemble of musicians, including Kool G Rap, Rah Digga, Sporty Thievz, Shabaam Sahdeeq, Common, Pharoahe Monch, Posdnuos, Donte and Main Flow of Mood, Nine, Tiye Phoenix, Breezly Brewin, Punchline, Imani Uzuri, Company Flow, Jah-Born, Jean Grae, John Forté, Mr. Khaliyl, Fre, J-Live, Rubix, Invincible, Wordsworth, A.L., Kofi Taha, Tame One, Jane Doe, Grafh, Shyheim, Channel Live, Wise Intelligent, Cappadonna, Crunch Lo, Rock, with cameo appearances from dead prez, Nonchalant, PMD, Ras Kass, and contributions from Doug E. Fresh and Najee, among others.

This was the last project that Company Flow contributed to for Rawkus, as they would depart from the label in early 2000, before the project released.

== Track listing ==
No.	Title	Writer(s)	Producer(s)	Length
1.	"Intro" (featuring Owen Brown and Evil Dee)			0:38
2.	"One Four Love (Part 1)" (featuring Talib Kweli, Kool G Rap, Rah Digga, Sporty Thievz, Mos Def, Shabaam Sahdeeq, Common, Pharoahe Monch and Posdnuos)	Talib Greene; Nathaniel Wilson; Rashia Fisher; Kirk Howell; Marlon Bryan; Shaarod Ford; Dante Smith; Marcus Vialva; Lonnie Lynn; Troy Jamerson; Kelvin Mercer; Douglas Davis; Najee Rasheed; Owen Brown, Jr.; Patrick Brown; Ray Murray; Rico Wade	Organized Noize	4:02
3.	"Protective Custody" (featuring Donte, Main Flow, Nine, Tiye Phoenix, Breezly Brewin, Talib Kweli, Punchline, Imani Uzuri, Company Flow, Jah-Born, What? What?, John Forté and Mr. Khaliyl)	Donte Fleming; Jermaine Manley; Derrick Keyes; J. Thomas; Paul Smith; Greene; Rashaan Truell; L. McGee; Jaime Meline; Leonard Smythe; W. Johnson; Tsidi Ibrahim; John Forté; Acklins Dillon	Mr. Khaliyl	5:48
4.	"A Tree Never Grown" (featuring Fre, J-Live, Rubix, Mos Def, Invincible, Wordsworth, A.L., Kofi Taha, Tame One, Jane Doe and Grafh)	J. Cozier; Jean-Jacques Cadet; Rubix Chung; D. Smith; Ilana Weaver; Vinson Johnson; Alex Mosquera; Kofi Taha; Rahem Brown; Latania Morris-Rossell; Phillip Bernard; Charles Njapa	88-Keys	6:39
5.	"One Four Love (Part 2)" (featuring Shyheim, Channel Live, Wise Intelligent, Mos Def, Cappadonna, Crunch Lo and Rock)	Shyheim Franklin; Hakim Green; Vincent Morgan; Timothy Grimes; D. Smith; Darryl Hill; Kareem Reed; Jahmal Bush; Clayton Gavin; Lavonne Alford; Tonya Pointer; Parrish Smith; John Austin; Davis; Rasheed; Brown, Jr.; Brown; Murray; Wade	Organized Noize	3:15
6.	"One Four Love" (Instrumental)		Organized Noize	4:03
7.	"Protective Custody" (Instrumental)		Mr. Khaliyl	5:49
8.	"A Tree Never Grown" (Instrumental)		88-Keys	6:41
Total length:				36:55

== Personnel ==
- Dante "Mos Def" Smith – vocals (tracks: 2, 4, 5), executive producer, sleeve notes
- Talib Kweli Greene – vocals (tracks: 2, 3), executive producer, sleeve notes
- Nathaniel "Kool G Rap" Wilson – vocals (track 2)
- Rashia "Rah Digga" Fisher – vocals (track 2)
- Kirk "King Kirk" Howell – vocals (track 2)
- Marlon "Brando" Bryan – vocals (track 2)
- Shaarod "Big Dubez" Ford – vocals (track 2)
- Marcus "Shabaam Sahdeeq" Vialva – vocals (track 2)
- Lonnie "Common" Lynn – vocals (track 2)
- Troy "Pharoahe Monch" Jamerson – vocals (track 2)
- Kelvin "Posdnuos" Mercer – vocals (track 2)
- Donte Fleming – vocals (track 3)
- Jermaine "Main Flow" Manley – vocals (track 3)
- J. "Tiye Phoenix" Thomas – vocals (track 3)
- Paul "Breezly Brewin" Smith – vocals (track 3)
- Rashaan "Punchline" Truell – vocals (track 3)
- Imani Uzuri – vocals (track 3)
- Jaime "El-P" Meline – vocals (track 3)
- Leonard "Mr. Len" Smythe – vocals & scratches (track 3)
- W. "Jah-Born" Johnson – vocals (track 3)
- Tsidi "Jean Grae" Ibrahim – vocals (track 3)
- John Forté – vocals (track 3)
- Acklins Khaliyl Dillon – vocals (track 3), producer (tracks: 3, 7)
- Fre – vocals (track 4)
- Jean-Jacques "J-Live" Cadet – vocals (track 4)
- Rubix Chung – vocals (track 4)
- Ilana "Invincible" Weaver – vocals (track 4)
- Vinson "Wordsworth" Johnson – vocals (track 4)
- Alex "A.L." Mosquera – vocals (track 4)
- Kofi Taha – vocals (track 4), painting
- Rahem "Tame One" Brown – vocals (track 4)
- Latania "Jane Doe" Morris-Rossell – vocals (track 4)
- Phillip "Grafh" Bernard – vocals (track 4)
- Shyheim Franklin – vocals (track 5)
- Hakim Green – vocals (track 5)
- Vincent "Tuffy" Morgan – vocals (track 5)
- Timothy "Wise Intelligent" Grimes – vocals (track 5)
- Darryl "Cappadonna" Hill – vocals (track 5)
- Kareem "Crunch Lo" Reed – vocals (track 5)
- Jahmal "Rock" Bush – vocals (track 5)
- Clayton "stic.man" Gavin – chorus vocals (track 5)
- Lavonne "M-1" Alford – chorus vocals (track 5)
- Tonya "Nonchalant" Pointer – chorus vocals (track 5)
- Parrish "PMD" Smith – chorus vocals (track 5)
- John "Ras Kass" Austin – chorus vocals (track 5)
- Ewart "Evil Dee" Dewgarde – drums (track 1)
- Owen "The Fiddler" Brown Jr. – fiddle (tracks: 1, 2, 5)
- Douglas "Doug E. Fresh" Davis – human beatbox (tracks: 2, 5)
- Jerome "Najee" Rasheed – flute (tracks: 2, 5)
- David Whild – guitar (tracks: 2, 5)
- Preston Crump – bass (tracks: 2, 5)
- Jeff Davidson – bass & recording (tracks: 3, 4), Moog synthesizer (track 3), guitar (track 4)
- Katie Neilson – Rhodes electric piano (track 3)
- Patrick "Sleepy" Brown – producer (tracks: 2, 5, 6), mixing (tracks: 2, 5)
- Ray Murray – producer (tracks: 2, 5, 6), mixing (tracks: 2, 5)
- Rico Wade – producer (tracks: 2, 5, 6), mixing (tracks: 2, 5)
- Charles "88-Keys" Njapa – producer (tracks: 4, 8)
- Nolan 'Dr. No' Moffitte – recording (tracks: 2, 5)
- Dave Raythatha – recording assistant (tracks: 2, 5)
- Bernasky Wall – mixing (tracks: 2, 5)
- Thomas Christopher Uzzo – mixing (track 3)
- David Kennedy – mixing (track 4)
- Won B – mixing (track 4)
- Duncan Stanbury – mastering
- Devin Roberson – executive producer, art direction
- Helen Simmons – associate executive producer
- Rene John-Sandy II – associate executive producer
- Arnold Steiner – design, artwork
- Michael Lawrence Marrow – design
- Gerard Young – design
- Evan Bishop – painting
- Greg Lewis – A&R coordinator
- Shawn "Blak Shawn" Glenn – A&R coordinator

== Charts ==
Chart (2000)	Peak position
UK Dance (OCC)	24
UK Hip Hop/R&B (OCC)	26
UK Indie (OCC)	36
