= Uproxx =

Pop culture news website

- Website type: Music and culture
- Available in: English
- Founded: 2008; 18 years ago
- Headquarters: Los Angeles, California, {{{location_country}}}
- Owner: Uproxx Studios
- Founders: Jarret Myer; Brian Brater
- Key people: Jarret Myer (CEO); Kristopher Maske (COO); Rich Antoniello (executive chairman); will.i.am (CVO)
- Website: uproxx.com

Uproxx (stylized in all caps) is an American music, entertainment, and popular culture website and content studio. It was founded in 2008 by Jarret Myer and Brian Brater. The website was acquired in 2014 by Woven Digital (which later changed its name to Uproxx Media Group). In August 2018, Uproxx Media Group was acquired by Warner Music Group, with Myer remaining in control of the company's operations as publisher.

In April 2024, Myer partnered with Rich Antoniello and will.i.am to form an independent company, Uproxx Studios, after acquiring Uproxx along with HipHopDX and Dime Magazine from Warner Music Group.

== History ==
Uproxx was founded in 2008 by Jarret Myer and Brian Brater, who previously co-founded the hip hop label Rawkus Records in 1996.

In April 2014, Uproxx was acquired by Woven Digital, an ad network company. In December 2014, Woven raised US$18 million in Series A funding with a portion of the capital allocated to growing Uproxx through staff hires and video development.

Myer joined Woven Digital as general manager of publishing. Uproxx was Woven Digital's largest brand, with a viewership of 40 million per month. Then Headquartered in Culver City, the company also had production facilities in New York City and Chicago. The Culver City offices housed a full production studio staffed by writers, illustrators, presenters and video editing staff; the company produced all of its own sponsored videos.

In January 2015, Uproxx acquired Dime Magazine to expand its sports division. Uproxx's coverage of film and TV was expanded with the acquisitions of HitFix in 2016. Following these acquisitions, the company had 110 employees as of March 2017. Benjamin Blank, who served as the chief creative officer, was also named CEO of the company in November 2016.

In August 2018, Warner Music Group announced that it had acquired Uproxx and its properties. While the acquisition was for an undisclosed sum, Uproxx had raised around $43 million (£33 million) from previous investment, possibly indicating the firm's valuation.

In February 2024, Warner indicated its plan to sell its owned media assets, including Uproxx and HipHopDX, as part of a shift to focus on its music business. Following this announcement, Myer partnered with Rich Antoniello and will.i.am to acquire Uproxx, HipHopDX, and Dime Magazine, bringing all three publications under an independent company named Uproxx Studios in April 2024. The new independent studio also reached a deal to represent Warner Music for all YouTube media sales in the United States. Myer was named CEO, Antoniello served as partner and executive chairman, and will.i.am joined as partner, investor, and chief visionary officer. Elliott Wilson was also appointed editorial director of hip-hop journalism overseeing Uproxx, HipHopDX and Dime Magazine.

== Content ==
Uproxx covers entertainment and popular culture, including fashion, music, and sports. Video makes up a significant portion of the site's content and Uproxx produces both original and sponsored video. After its acquisition by Woven, Uproxx placed more emphasis on video content and released several web series. It develops web originals, long- and short-form series and films.

Luminaries, a show that profiled young scientists and inventors, was Uproxx’s first original series in January 2015. The first two episodes of the series generated 18.5 million views within the first four months. Luminaries was nominated for a Webby Award in 2015. Also in 2015, Uproxx launched several sponsored video series. Among these were Human, a video series about artisans and others who preserve traditional work, sponsored by Coors Banquet, and Uncharted: Power of Dreams, a show that profiles rising musicians, with Honda, Uncharted won a Clio Award in 2016. In 2017, Uproxx created a piece of branded content for fast food chain Checkers featuring rapper Rick Ross.

In June 2021, Uproxx and Pilot Boy Productions produced the podcast People's Party with Talib Kweli, which was co-created by rapper Talib Kweli and Myer. The podcast was a weekly interview series featuring celebrity guests that aired on the podcast network Luminary. In 2022, Uproxx released a new web series titled Fresh Pair hosted by hip-hop producer Just Blaze and sneaker designer Katty Customs. The series returned in 2023 for a second season.

=== Uproxx Music Critics Poll ===
Since 2018, Uproxx has held the Uproxx Music Critics Poll, a poll which tabulates the submitted lists of invited music critics, similar to the discontinued Village Voice Pazz & Jop poll. The following albums and songs have topped the poll since its introduction:

Albums

Year	Artist	Album	Ref.
2018	Kacey Musgraves	Golden Hour	
2019	Lana Del Rey	Norman Fucking Rockwell!	
2020	Fiona Apple	Fetch the Bolt Cutters	
2021	Japanese Breakfast	Jubilee	
2022	Beyoncé	Renaissance	
2023	Boygenius	The Record	
2024	Charli XCX	Brat	

Songs

Year	Artist	Album	Ref.
2018	Ariana Grande	"Thank U, Next"	
2019	N/A	N/A	N/A
2020	Phoebe Bridgers	"I Know the End"	
2021	Olivia Rodrigo	"Good 4 U"	
2022	Beyoncé	"Break My Soul"	
2023	Boygenius	"Not Strong Enough"	
2024	Kendrick Lamar	"Not Like Us"	
