= Poor People's Day =

Studio album by Bigg Jus
- Released: November 8, 2005
- Genre: Alternative hip hop
- Length: 44:42
- Label: Mush Records
- Producer: DJ Gman

Bigg Jus chronology
Black Mamba Serums v2.0 (2004)	Poor People's Day (2005)	Machines That Make Civilization Fun (2012)

Poor People's Day is a solo studio album by American hip hop musician Bigg Jus, a former member of Company Flow. It was released on Mush Records in 2005. The album is entirely produced by DJ Gman.

== Critical reception ==
Professional ratings
Review scores
Source	Rating
AllHipHop	3/5
AllMusic	4.5/5 stars
CMJ New Music Monthly	favorable
IGN	9.3/10
NPR	favorable
RapReviews.com	7.5/10

Stewart Mason of AllMusic gave the album 4.5 stars out of 5, calling it "the rapper's most immediately accessible album, with less fractured, smoother beats and fewer outlandish arrangements underneath his lyrics." He added, "Those lyrics are as uncompromising as ever, but the friendlier settings make Bigg Jus' position statements and character studies sound easier to get into than ever before, which increases their strength considerably."

Owen Strock of CMJ New Music Monthly described it as "an anti-globalization opus of dusty beats and multi-syllabic rhymes that sound like Ghostface, RZA and Noam Chomsky having a threeway."

== Track listing ==
No.	Title	Length
1.	"Everything Must Coincide"	1:18
2.	"Supa Nigga"	3:32
3.	"Energy Harvester (Swallow the Sun)"	4:23
4.	"This Is Poor People's Day"	4:34
5.	"Orbital Mechanics"	4:34
6.	"Halogen Lanterns"	6:24
7.	"Illustrations of Hieronymus Bosch... That 1467 Shit"	3:34
8.	"Night Before"	3:43
9.	"Eerie Silence"	1:27
10.	"When They Start... 1997 Uptop Shit"	3:57
11.	"Memories of You"	1:59
12.	"Anything You See Fit (Change by Design)"	4:01
13.	"Been Here Forever"	1:16
Total length:		44:42
