= The Last Emperor (rapper) =

American rapper

- Born: Jamal Gray; 1 May 1972 (age 53)
- Origin: Philadelphia, Pennsylvania, U.S.
- Genres: Alternative hip-hop
- Labels: Aftermath; Rawkus; Raptivism; Red Planet
- Website: www.TheLastEmp.com

The Last Emperor is the recording name of Jamal Gray, Philadelphia-born hip-hop artist. Gray took his stage name from the Bernardo Bertolucci film epic of the same name (The Last Emperor). He attended and graduated Overbrook High School (Philadelphia) then went on to obtain a Bachelor of Science degree in Political Science/International Relations from Lincoln University.

He moved to New York and began performing at open mic nights. The Last Emperor was featured in a verse on KRS-One's "C.I.A. (Criminals in Action)" with Zack de la Rocha. Two years after moving to New York he was signed to Aftermath Entertainment, and became a protégé of Dr. Dre. In 2003 it was announced that The Last Emperor had signed to Rawkus Records. A few singles were released in a period of 6 months, but the label unexpectedly stopped releasing any music. The Last Emperor then formed Red Planet Music to release his debut album, Music, Magic, Myth. Red Planet's releases are distributed by Raptivism.

He has opened for such acts as the former Def Squad (Redman, EPMD, Das EFX and K-Solo), Common, The Roots, and KRS-One. He has performed at the Lyricist Lounge. He's traveled around the world performing in places like Denmark (Roskilde Festival), London (Jam in the Park), and Norway (Quart Festival). He also appeared as the guest MC for Gorillaz.

The Last Emperor released his debut album Music, Magic, Myth (Palace of the Pretender in Europe) in 2003. A single, "Black Apache", was released on Red Planet in September 2006.

The Last Emperor's album titled Wizards Wardrobe was slated for a release date 27 June 2010 but never materialized, though a music video for the first single "Fine Art" was released.

== Discography ==
Albums

- 2000: The Legend of Bigfoot (Unofficial, internet leak of early demos)
- 2003: Music, Magic, Myth
- 2003: Palace of the Pretender (European release of Music, Magic, Myth)
- 2018: "Jungle Jim" Season 1 (with Haak Filmore)
- 2019: Lord of the Fly (with Haak Filmore)
- 2022: The Wizard, The Witch, and The Wolfman (with Haak Filmore)

Mixtapes

- 2006: Hidden Treasures
- 2009: Science Team...Go!

Singles

- 1997: Bums / Monumental / Secret Wars Part 1
- 1999: Echo Leader / Charlie / Rap Tyranny
- 2000: Fo'rel / Heavyweight Invincible / The Dozen
- 2001: The Banger / The Umph
- 2003: Who’s That / Prisoner
- 2003: Secret Wars Part 2 / Some Love, Some Hate
- 2003: Here We Are
- 2006: Black Apache / Gangsta Groove
- 2010: Fine Art
- 2011: Pots and Pans
