= Last hit =

Last Hit may refer to:

- "Last Hit", a song by The High & Mighty, later released as "The Last Hit (feat. Eminem)" from the album Home Field Advantage
- Last Hit, an upcoming film starring UFC fighter Elias Theodorou
- Last hitting, the common act of delivering the killing blow in MOBA video games
- The Last Producer, also known as The Last Hit, a 2001 film
