= Decepticons (gang) =

Defunct Brooklyn street gang

- Named after: Decepticons from the Transformers franchise
- Founding location: Brooklyn, New York, USA
- Years active: Late 1980s – early 1990s
- Activities: Robberies
- Notable members: Sticky Fingaz, Fredro Starr, Rock, Sean Price

The Decepticons, or Decepts, were a Brooklyn street gang active from the mid-1980s into the early 1990s. Originating as a bond of "brotherhood" and naming themselves after the main antagonists of the Transformers franchise, the gang soon escalated into one of the most notable gangs of their era, noted for their flash-mob style attacks and muggings.

== History ==
The Decepticons were a street gang or street organization that thrived from the mid-80s through the early 90s. Their members were teenagers and young adults ranging from the age of 15 to early 20s. The gang was most prominent in Brooklyn, but at their peak the group consisted of multiple branches all across New York City. The original group of Decepticons started in Brooklyn, with three boys from two different schools; this original group was named Megatron, while members from Bushwick had the names Rumble and Cyclonus. One of the schools is believed to be Brooklyn Tech High School. From there, the gang quickly expanded and multiplied in different ways independently of the original group: lacking a formal structure, many of the divisions formed would claim membership without any connection to, or formal approval from, the original group. Such divisions expanded at first through the various neighborhoods of Brooklyn (in particular Clinton Hill, Flatbush, East Flatbush, and Bed-Stuy, Brooklyn), and later into Queens and The Bronx; these offshoots, in contrast to the ones in Brooklyn, consisted primarily of Latinos.

Female members were referred to as Deceptinettes. According to former member Isis Sapp-Grant, membership was earned through violent hazing rituals that varied by gender: male initiates were subjected to the "jump in", where they would be beaten by several chapter members at once, while the women were subjected to being "sex[ed] in" by multiple male members in one night.

== Notable members and musical legacy ==
As their presence began to fade in the early 1990s, a few members transitioned into music: former Decepticons and associates include Sticky Fingaz, Fredro Starr, Rock, Dallas Penn and Sean Price. Artists such as Necro and Jay-Z have made reference to the Decepticons in their music, the latter referring in particular to their flash-mob style muggings: "Wasn't safe on the A-Train, D, G or the F / Decepticons, Lo Life niggas snatch the Polos off your chest."

The song "P.N.C" by Smif-n-Wessun was dedicated to Sean Grady (a.k.a Rambo), a member and former leader of the gang. The song also makes references to the duo being involved with the Decepticons.

== Methods ==
Acts of violence would most frequently come in the form of robberies. The gang would converge on the subways and from there hang out on the corners of streets by neighboring schools. If a physically weak looking target approached them, the gang would surround them and swiftly mug them, defining themselves by the particular speed and swiftness of their muggings. The subways themselves, being cramped, crowded and noisy, were a particularly popular target: in a typical Subway mugging the Decepticons would rush into a train car, robbing people of whatever they could before making a swift getaway.

Besides muggings, Decepticon members (primarily the Deceptinettes) would play games such as "One Punch Knockout": seeing if they could knock out a random, unsuspecting person with one punch.
