= Rack-Lo =

American author and rapper

- Born: George Billips; Brooklyn
- Occupations: Rapper and Author

George Billips, better known by his stage name Rack-Lo, is an American author and rapper from Brooklyn, and a founding member of the Lo Lifes.

== Lo Lifes ==
In 1988, Rack-Lo co-founded the Lo Lifes, a Ralph Lauren Polo "racking" or "boosting" (shoplifting) crew that formed from the union of two smaller crews from Brownsville and Crown Heights neighborhoods in Brooklyn. His nickname combines "rack" with "lo", short for Polo. In an interview with Fader, Rack-Lo recalls the appeal of Polo:

"By seeing the clothing it inspired us to know that there was more to life than being in Brooklyn and being stuck here, living at this limited pace. It inspired us to pursue those things: to go yachting, to be on Fifth Avenue, to be a part of the rich and the elite, and to try and acquire the American Dream the way we know how to do it. And that was through fashion and boosting."

In 2016, powerHouse Books published Rack-Lo and Jackson Blount's book about the Lo-Lifes entitled Lo-Life: An American Classic. A book review in the F-Stop Magazine called it a "remarkable story of a small group of teenagers fighting to make a name for themselves", and one in the New York Journal of Books considered it "somewhat of a revelation as it is not a varnished and glorified telling of fashion but much more of a down and dirty gritty tale of the sociological, visual, and material value."

In a 2018 interview, Rack-Lo stated "Yes, I have been caught on many occasions. As a result I was locked up in juvenile detention and I was an inmate on the infamous ‘Riker’s Island’. But in my case I was still fortunate because I never spent time in prison — only in city jails for very short time periods. The longest I spent incarcerated was four months."

== Discography ==
Rack-Lo has released several albums and songs, often in collaboration with or production by fellow Lo-Life Thirstin Howl the 3rd.

Albums:

- (2000) Thou Shalt Not Steal. Skillionaire.
- (2002) Aracknofoebia: The Art Of Webslinging, with Lo Wife. Skillionaire.
- (2002) Rack Lauren. Skillionaire.
- (2002) Prince Of Thieves, with Lo-Kid. Spit Factory.
- (2004) Golden Era Terror. Skillionaire, Spit Factory.
- (2006) Lo Down & Dirty, with Thirstin Howl III. Class A Records.
- (2006) Rack$ 2 Riche$, with Richie Balance. Skillionaire, Spit Factory.
- (2006) Polo Kings volume 1. Spit Factory.
- (2008) Golden Era Terror volume 2
- (2009) Famous Chain Snatcher / Criminals
- (2009) Rap or Robbery
- (2010) Polo Kings volume 2
- (2012) Polo Kings volume 3
- (2013) Polo Classics
- (2013) Tarantula
- (2014) Lo-Life Gentlemens Club
- (2021) Lo Life: An American Classic Soundtrack
- (2021) Rac Man

Singles and EPs:

- (2000) Spit In Ya Face. Skillionaire, Concrete Productions
- (2003) Rackamatics. Get A Life Entertainment.
- (2005) 5 Finger Discount, with T. Howl III. Class A Records.
- (2005) Gifted. Rap Star Records.
- (2008) Talking to the Dead
- (2009) Famous Chain Snatcher / Criminals
- (2014) Lo-Life Gentlemens Club

Some songs:

- (2000) Skillosopher
- (2001) Serial Skiller
- (2001) Underground Airplay Version 1.0
- (2002) Skilligan's Island
- (2007) Egoclapper
- (2009) Gode Ord Dør Sist
- (2010) FACT 122
- (2017) Skillmatic
- (2020) Polo Palace - Palace Polo
