= Black Mamba Serums v2.0 =

Studio album by Bigg Jus
- Released: June 28, 2004
- Genre: Alternative hip hop
- Length: 50:15
- Label: Big Dada
- Producer: Bigg Jus; DJ Gman

Bigg Jus chronology
Black Mamba Serums v2.0 (2004)	Poor People's Day (2005)

Black Mamba Serums v2.0 is a solo studio album by American hip hop musician Bigg Jus, a former member of Company Flow. It was released on Big Dada in 2004.

== Critical reception ==
Professional ratings
Review scores
Source	Rating
BBC Music	favorable
Drowned in Sound	favorable
Dusted Magazine	favorable
Prefix	7/10

Mike Krolak of Prefix gave the album a 7 out of 10, saying, "Still shunning the money-cash-hoes routine for abstract, brain-twisting beats and rhymes, Jus clearly hash't let his skills atrophy." Jack Smith of BBC Music wrote, "This is an engaging effort that can only build on the legacy of Company Flow."

In 2015, Fact placed it at number 16 on the "100 Best Indie Hip-Hop Records of All Time" list.

== Track listing ==
No.	Title	Length
1.	"NYC Color Designer"	1:40
2.	"Kingspitter"	2:13
3.	"Plantation Rhymes (Southern Hospitality Mix)"	4:11
4.	"The Fr8s"	3:00
5.	"Silver Back Mountain King"	5:28
6.	"I Triceratops"	4:23
7.	"The Story Entangles (The Under Flippage)"	4:48
8.	"You Must Be Sniffin"	3:31
9.	"Moss Pink Coats '99"	3:38
10.	"No Dessert till You Finish Your Vegetables" (featuring Marq Spekt)	4:34
11.	"Dedication to Peo '97"	4:40
12.	"Suburbian Nightmare Texas Size New World Order"	4:09
13.	"Say Goodbye"	6:39
Total length:		50:15
