= Soundbombing =

Compilation album by Rawkus Records
- Released: October 14, 1997
- Genre: Hip-hop
- Length: 69:54
- Label: Rawkus
- Producer: Ghetto Professionals; Dirtman; El-P; Bigg Jus; Nick Wiz; Hi-Tek; Rich Boogie; Sir Menelik; Chuckie Madness; Shawn J. Period; DJ Spinna

Rawkus Records chronology
Soundbombing (1997)	Lyricist Lounge, Volume One (1998)

Soundbombing is a hip-hop compilation album by Rawkus Records, released on October 14, 1997. The album helped launch the careers of Mos Def and Reflection Eternal (Talib Kweli and Hi-Tek), who later became Rawkus's most popular artists. Soundbombing is regarded as a "scene-defining" underground hip-hop album.

== Background ==
After the critical success of Company Flow's Funcrusher Plus album, released a few months prior, Rawkus returned with a compilation that showcased their growing roster. Mixed by DJ Evil Dee of Da Beatminerz, the album is sequenced like a mixtape, staying true to the label's underground roots. The album is mainly composed of 12" singles previously released by the label in 1997. It is subtitled "The Ultimate Guide to Underground Hip-Hop Mixed by Evil Dee".

== Critical reception ==
Professional ratings
Review scores
Source	Rating
AllMusic	4/5 stars
Christgau's Consumer Guide	A−
NME	8/10

Soundbombing received mostly positive reviews from music critics. Charles Aaron of Spin noted that "you can hear the hints of a Native Tongues-like posse feeding off of one another's smarts and enthusiasm, unworried about recreating 1988's magic or being welcomed into rap's gated fantasyland." In his consumer guide for The Village Voice, Robert Christgau gave the album an A− rating and stated, "this singles-plus showcase is 'underground' hip hop's most convincing advertisement for itself", also praising the performances of Mos Def, Talib Kweli and R.A. the Rugged Man.

Writing for AllMusic, Nathan Rabin believed that the album "arrived at a crucial juncture for rap music, just as the deaths of 2Pac and Notorious B.I.G. forced hip-hop to re-examine its priorities, and the commercial dominance of Bad Boy necessitated a smart, socially conscious alternative to P. Diddy's blatantly commercial brand of karaoke hip-pop." Dana Scott of Ambrosia for Heads wrote that the album "was Hip-Hop seeking refuge to return to the culture's days of innocence. It worked, signaling a rebirth that spawned a new breed of MC legends—and a subsequent series that Heads could trust." In the 5th edition of his Encyclopedia of Popular Music, Colin Larkin hailed it as a "scene-defining" underground hip-hop album.

== Track listing ==
No.	Title	Producer(s)	Length
1.	"Intro" (Brick City Kids & Evil Dee)	Ghetto Professionals	1:17
2.	"Flipside" (R.A. the Rugged Man)	Dirtman	2:13
3.	"Fire in Which You Burn" (Indelible MC's)	El-P	4:52
4.	"Lune TNS" (Company Flow)	Bigg Jus	3:13
5.	"Nightwork" (Sir Menelik)	El-P	4:04
6.	"Arabian Nights" (Shabaam Sahdeeq)	Nick Wiz	4:13
7.	"Fortified Live" (Reflection Eternal featuring Mos Def and Mr. Man)	Hi-Tek	5:11
8.	"Show Me Your Gratitude" (L-Fudge)	Rich Boogie	3:55
9.	"'Till My Heart Stops" (R.A. the Rugged Man featuring 8-Off the Assassin)	Dirtman	4:10
10.	"Freestyle" (Mos Def and Talib Kweli)		4:38
11.	"So Intelligent" (Sir Menelik featuring Kool Keith)	Sir Menelik	4:10
12.	"Empire Staters" (B-1)	Chuckie Madness	4:06
13.	"If You Can Huh..." (Mos Def)	Shawn J. Period	3:44
14.	"Universal Magnetic" (Mos Def)	Shawn J. Period	4:07
15.	"What If?" (L-Fudge featuring Mike Zoot, Shabaam Sahdeeq, Skam and Talib Kweli)	DJ Spinna	5:27
16.	"My Crown" (Black Attack)	Ghetto Professionals	3:40
17.	"2000 Seasons" (Reflection Eternal)	Hi-Tek	6:54
Total length:			69:54
