= Machines That Make Civilization Fun =

Studio album by Bigg Jus
- Released: June 5, 2012
- Genre: Alternative hip hop
- Length: 37:27
- Label: Mush Records
- Producer: Bigg Jus

Bigg Jus chronology
| Poor People's Day (2005) | Machines That Make Civilization Fun (2012) |

Singles from Machines That Make Civilization Fun
- 1. "Black Roses" Released: April 17, 2012

Machines That Make Civilization Fun is a solo studio album by American hip hop musician Bigg Jus, a former member of Company Flow. It was released on Mush Records in 2012. "Black Roses" was released as a single from the album.

== Critical reception ==
Professional ratings
Aggregate scores
| Source | Rating |
|---|---|
| Metacritic | 65/100 |
Review scores
| Source | Rating |
| BBC Music | favorable |
| Exclaim! | favorable |
| Fact | 4/5 stars |
| PopMatters | 7/10 stars |
| The Skinny | 4/5 stars |

At Metacritic, which assigns a weighted average score out of 100 to reviews from mainstream critics, the album received an average score of 65, based on 7 reviews, indicating "generally favorable reviews".

Thomas Quinlan of Exclaim! wrote, "Machines That Make Civilization Fun is Bigg Jus's best, most well-rounded solo album so far, but it's still a difficult listen that will likely limit the album's appeal to advanced listeners only." Emma H. Sundstrom of PopMatters gave the album 7 stars out of 10, stating, "It's hard to gauge now how dated it will sound in five or ten years, but at this moment, it's the neurotic and deafening sound of a civilization whose machines are beginning to break down, and it sounds terrifyingly familiar." Bram E. Gieben of The Skinny gave the album 4 stars out of 5, commenting that "Far from instant gratification, what this album offers is a puzzle-box of rhymes and beats to decode; at times cryptic, at others feral and intense."

Fact placed it at number 50 on the "50 Best Albums of 2012" list.

== Track listing ==
| No. | Title | Length |
|---|---|---|
| 1. | "Crossing the Line" | 1:10 |
| 2. | "Game Boy Predator" | 3:44 |
| 3. | "Black Roses" | 2:57 |
| 4. | "Advanced Lightbody Activation" | 2:59 |
| 5. | "Empire Is a Bitch (Fake Arab Spring Mix)" | 3:05 |
| 6. | "Food for Thought (Shit Sandwiches)" | 2:16 |
| 7. | "Hard Times for New Lovers" | 2:56 |
| 8. | "Machines That Make Civilization Fun" | 5:07 |
| 9. | "Polymathmatics (Restore Balance Out Think a Savage Trick)" | 1:50 |
| 10. | "Redemption Sound Dub" | 2:07 |
| 11. | "Samson Op-Ed" | 3:21 |
| 12. | "Kush Star Catalog" | 2:09 |
| 13. | "Respective of F1 Dub" | 3:46 |
| Total length: | | 37:27 |
