= 7 Notas 7 Colores =

Spanish hip-hop group

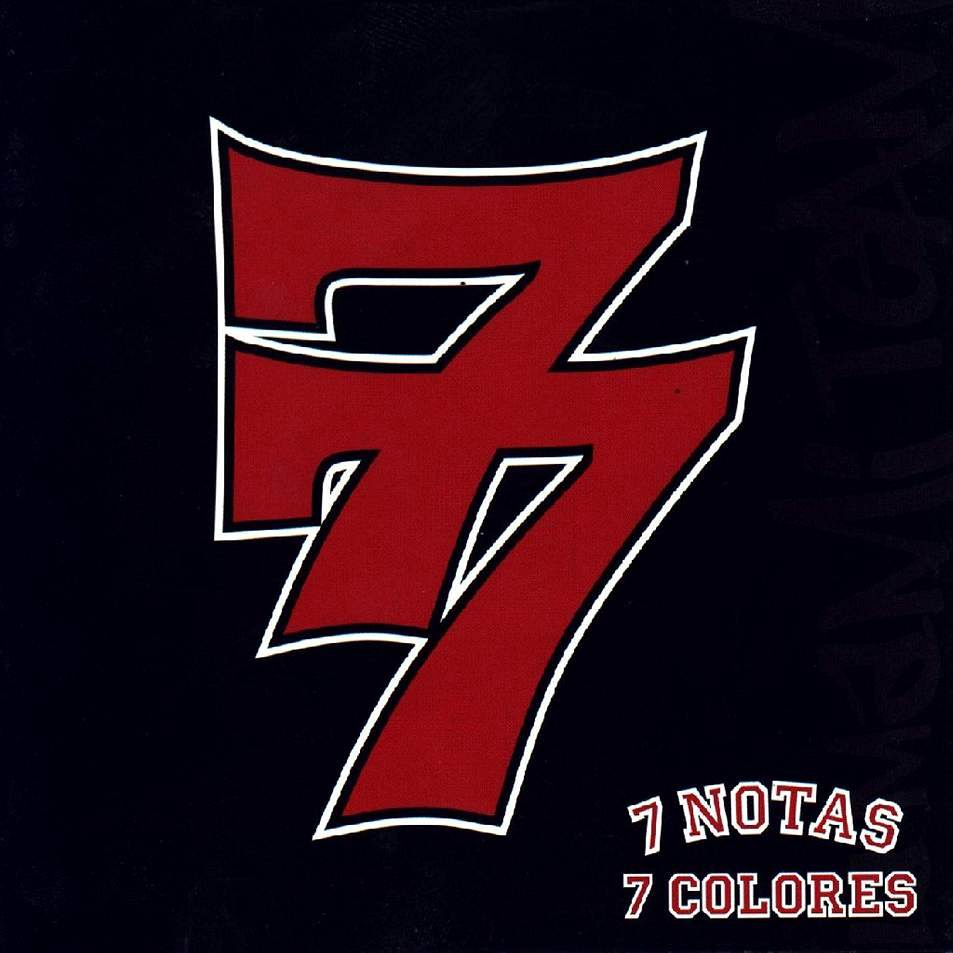

Background information
- Origin: Barcelona, Spain
- Genres: Hip-hop
- Members: Mucho Muchacho, Dive Dibosso, Eddy la Sombra

7 Notas 7 Colores is a Spanish hip-hop group of the 90's hailing from Barcelona.

== Biography ==
7 Notas 7 Colores emerged in Barcelona in 1993, when there were few rap groups in Spain. Its members were from different towns and neighborhoods around the city: Mucho Muchacho from El Prat, Dive Dibosso from San Andrés/Sant Andreu and later member Eddy la Sombra from Sabadell.

In the beginning, only Mucho Muchacho (aka Mucho Mu) was at the mic, and Dive Dibosso dealt with the production. They were accompanied by DJ Neas on live performances, but left after the first album was released.

Later, Eddy Drammeh (aka Eddy La Sombra) joined them as a rapper; and they took Russian DJ Vadim behind the turntable. They made a song with Company Flow. After that, they started to record their albums in the United States. They were introduced to the U.S. market by Juan Brujo, from Brujeria.

They had many problems with their label, so they started their own, La Mami Internacional, releasing an album with the same title. After that, they disappeared from the rap scene, although Mucho Muchacho made a solo album, under his own label C.R.E.A.M., called Chulería, a Spanish word for "cockiness". Ray Roll, Tony Touch and Griffi also collaborated in the LP.

Nowadays, Mucho Mu works at a disco in Ibiza as a DJ.

In 2007, they announced the return of 7 Notas 7 Colores, with a new formation. DJ Vadim will be the producer, along with Mucho Muchacho and Principante, an MC from Valencia, who has a solo LP.

== Discography ==
- Con esos ojitos/Puercos (1997) (Maxi)
- Hecho, es simple (1997) (LP)
- La medicina (1998) (Maxi)
- 77 (1999) (LP)
- Gorilas y bananas (1999) (Maxi)
- Yo vivo (2000) (Maxi)
- La Mami Internacional (2000) (LP)
