= Nephlim Modulation Systems =

- Also known as: NMS
- Origin: United States
- Genres: Alternative hip hop
- Years active: 2003–present
- Label: Big Dada
- Members: Bigg Jus; Orko Eloheim

Nephlim Modulation Systems (abbreviated NMS) is an American hip hop duo, consisting of Bigg Jus and Orko Eloheim.

In 2003, the group released the first album, Woe to Thee O Land Whose King Is a Child, on Big Dada. AllMusic gave the album 4 out of 5 stars. Imperial Letters of Protection was released on Big Dada in 2005. As of 2023, a third album is in the works, titled Liberation Is the Only Thing Left.

== Discography ==
Albums

- Woe to Thee O Land Whose King Is a Child (2003)
- Imperial Letters of Protection (2005)
- Liberation Is the Only Thing Left (TBA)
