= Lyricist Lounge =

Hip hop showcase of rappers, emcees, DJs, and graffiti artists

- Genre: Hip Hop music
- Dates: year-round
- Location: United States
- Years active: 1991 - present
- Founders: Danny Castro, Ant Marshall

The Lyricist Lounge is a hip hop showcase of rappers, emcees, DJs, and Graffiti artists.

It has spawned the album Lyricist Lounge, Volume One, Lyricist Lounge 2 and Lyricist Lounge & Ecko Unlimited presents: Underground Airplay, as well as a television show, The Lyricist Lounge Show.

The Lyricist Lounge was founded in 1991 by hip hop aficionados Danny Castro and Anthony Marshall. It was a series of open mic events hosted in a small studio apartment on the Lower East Side of Manhattan in New York City.

== West Coast events ==
Date	City	Venue	Lineup
May 30, 2009	San Francisco, California	MIGHTY, 119 Utah St.	Featuring Pacific Division, U-N-I, and Mickey Factz. Also HOPE, Tiron, Ayomari & J Billion with DJ Ant Marshall, DJ Haylow (D2S) - with a video DJ set, DJ Strategy

== East Coast events ==
Date	City	Venue	Lineup	Attendance
October 2007	New York City	Southpaw	Lyricist Lounge & Afro Punk Presents: Kings Of Rock showcase. Performances by M.O.P., Game Rebellion & Lordz Of Brooklyn	500
August 2007	Brooklyn, New York	Prospect Park	Celebrate Brooklyn event with Performances By KRS-One, Lady Bug Mecca, DJ Scratch and others	8000 (sold out)
May 2007	New York City	Southpaw	CCarte Blanche Tour with Performances by Slum Village, Phat Cat, Illa J (Jay Dilla's brother) & Blitz the Ambassador	350
February 17, 1998	Las Vegas, Nevada	Club Rio Hotel & Casino	Hosted by Guru of Gang starr. Sponsored by Rap Pages, Willie Esco, Spiewak and U.B. Tuff Clothing. Notable performances by The Roots, Whoriders, M.O.P., Medusa & Bushwick Bill	1200
February 12, 1998	Atlanta, Georgia	Club Kaya	Hosted by Cocoa Brovas. Sponsored by Loud Records, ASCAP. Notable performances by Dead Prez & Cocoa Brovas.	750
January 27, 1998	New York City	Latin Quarter	Hosted by Fat Joe. Sponsored by Mecca Clothing, Stress Magazine, and Relativity Records. Notable Performances by M.O.P, Big Punisher, Hussein Fatal, Eminem, Tony Stanz.	2000
December 16, 1997	New York City	Latin Quarter	Hosted by Lost Boyz. Sponsored by ASCAP, Stress Magazine. Notable performances by Word of Mouth, P-Dap, Jesse West & Nine, Large Professor, Dead Prez, Destruct & Icon.	1500
December 10, 1997	Atlanta, Georgia	Club Kaya	Hosted by Goodie Mob. Sponsored by Rawkus Records. Notable performances by Eternal Reflections, Company Flow, BHA Enterprize, Mass-Influence, Micronaughts, Ghetto All-Stars.	700
August 22, 1997	New York City	El Flamingo	Hosted by Common. Sponsored by URB, BMI, and Relativity Records. Notable performances by The Beatnuts, Mos Def, Cipher Complete, Royal Flush, and Rah Digga.	875
May 26, 1997	New York City	Tramps	Hosted by Buckshot of the Boot Camp Click. Sponsored by Rawkus Entertainment, Rudeboy Clothing, and Urb Magazine. Notable performances by Survival Sounds, Company Flow, Teflon, Natural Elements, Building Block, Supernatural, Cru, & Mr. Complex.	750
Winter 1991	New York City	45 Orchard St.	Educated Rapper, Da Bush Babees, Moptops, Doug E. Fresh, Jamal Ski	25

== September 2000 tour ==
City	Venue	Sponsors	Lineup
16 U.S. cities		Sohh.com, Truth.com, Rawkus Records, and ClickRadio.com	Rotating line up of headlining performers include Mos Def, Bernie Worrell (of Parliament/Funkadelic), Slum Village, Bahamadia, Wordsworth, Piakhan, Will Calhoun (of Living Colour) and Dr. Know (of Bad Brains).

== November 1999 tour ==
City	Venue	Sponsors	Lineup
13 U.S. Cities		MP3.COM, Tommy Boy Records, Priority Records, and Famous Artist Booking Agency	Rotating line up of headlining performers include Slick Rick, EPMD, Outsidaz, Royce da 5'9", Planet Asia and others

== September 1998 tour ==
City	Venue	Sponsors	Lineup
11 U.S. cities	House of Blues (LA/Chicago), The Tunnel (NY), Cameo Theater (Miami), Maritime Hall (SF), Avalon (Boston) and Electric Factory (PA).	EXSTO XXIV VII clothing, Blaze Magazine, 550 Music/Sony, Relativity Records, Loud Records, Rawkus Records, Tommy Boy/Black Label Records, and Open Mic Records.	Rotating line up of headlining performers include Slick Rick, Black Star, Big Pun, KRS-One, De La Soul, Kid Capri, The Roots, Common, The Last Emperor, Defari, Da Matrix, Dead Prez and future superstars Eminem and Royce da 5'9

== See also ==
- List of hip hop music festivals
- Hip hop culture
