= Orko Eloheim =

- Birth name: David Wali Rahmaan Ebn Hassan Bullard
- Also known as: Orko the Sycotik Alien
- Born: July 16, 1976
- Genres: Alternative hip hop Underground hip hop Drum and bass
- Occupation(s): Rapper, producer
- Years active: 1994-present
- Labels: 777 Beats; Big Dada; Plague Language; Fuk Da Industry; Addictive Sound; Filtered Souls; Mark of the Beats; Anti-Party Music; Walkman Terrorist; GPAC; 2012 Dynasty; Neurocore
- Website: Orko Eloheim on Bandcamp

David Wali Rahmaan Ebn Hassan Bullard, better known by his stage name Orko Eloheim (formerly Orko the Sycotik Alien) (born July 16, 1976) is an American alternative hip hop artist from San Diego, California. He is also one half of the duo Nephlim Modulation Systems with Bigg Jus.

== Early life ==
Orko grew up in Encanto, San Diego, where he first started recording his own music in the mid-1980s.

== Discography ==
Albums

- Microcrusifiction (1994) (Masters of the Universe)
- Bak 2 tha Future (1995) (Masters of the Universe)
- Avantgarde Talk (1996)
- Doomsday Prophet (1996)
- Phlowtation Devices (1997) (Global Phlowtations Artist Committee)
- Orko tha Sycotik Alien (1997)
- Crop Formations (1997)
- Neuro-Symphony in C Minor (1998) (Masters of the Universe)
- 98' Unheard (1998) (Global Phlowtations Artist Committee)
- The Fucked Up Planet (1998)
- Dreadlocks, Incense and Oils (2000)
- Eyemagedon (2002)
- Nucleus (2002) (Global Phlowtations Artist Committee)
- Woe to Thee O Land Whose King Is a Child (2003) (Nephlim Modulation Systems)
- Elohim Soundwave Scientist (2003)
- Atoms of Eden (2003)
- 777 Beats (2004)
- The King of Hell (2004)
- Imperial Letters of Protection (2005) (Nephlim Modulation Systems)
- Chaos Is My Friend (2006)
- Post War Technology (2007) (with Odessa Kane)
- 777 Beats Acid Bible (2007)
- Forbidden Physics (2007)
- Kill Your Computer (2008) (Left Handed Scientists)
- Mechanical Habitat (2008) (Left Handed Scientists, & Anti Citiz3ns)
- 8-Bit+Basquiot (2011)
- Kill Your Present Future (2012) (Left Handed Scientists)
- Audio+Achetech+Android+Autistic (2012)
- African Technology (2014)
- TBA (2016) (Nephlim Modulation Systems)
- Ultranet with FSTZ (2016) RogueDubs
- Ancient Future: Conversations with God (2017) (with Aceyalone)

EPs

- Walkman Terrorist EP (1998)
- Rules of Thumb (1999) (with Isosceles)
- Walk to the Edge of the Earth (2005)

Compilations

- Starsystem Blacktica (2005)
- Wardrum Machine Dub (2007)
- Drum Warz (2007)

Guest appearances

- Noah23 - "Trilateral Damage" from Mitochondrial Blues (2004)
- Unklefesta AKA FSTZ "IGF" from "Forbidden Physics" (2007)
- StapleMouth - "Trilateral Damage", "Outbreak" & "10 Kingz (Mega Tuff)" from Un-Everything Except Three (2009)
- Kaigen - "Give My All" from "In the Clutch / Give My All" (2011)
- Divine Styler - "Invalid Stratum Don't Compute" from "Def Mask" (2015)
