= Skilligan's Island =

Studio album by Thirstin Howl III
- Released: July 23, 2002
- Genre: Hip hop
- Length: 54:03
- Label: LandSpeed Records
- Producer: Thirstin Howl III (also exec.); Steve Boston; P.F. Cuttin'; DJ Spinna; Will Tell

Thirstin Howl III chronology
Serial Skiller (2001)	Skilligan's Island (2002)	Skillitary (2004)

Professional ratings
Review scores
Source	Rating
Allmusic	3/5 stars

Skilligan's Island is the fourth studio album by American rapper Thirstin Howl III, who also served as producer and executive producer for the album. It was released on July 23, 2002, through Landspeed Records.

== History ==
Skilligan's Island was also produced by Steve Boston, P.F. Cuttin' (who also mixed the album), DJ Spinna (who also mixed the album along with P.F. Cuttin'), and Will Tell. Guest appearances on this album include Disco, Unique London, Big Boo, Rack-Lo, Master Fool, Cita, Eminem, Father Time, and God Forbid, among others.

This album was composed by Thirstin Howl III, L. Michael Smith, Angel Cruz, and Eminem, as credited for the album on AllMusic.

== Track listing ==
No.	Title	Producer(s)	Length
1.	"Thirstyman" (featuring Disco & Unique London)	Thirstin Howl III	3:05
2.	"Stole" (featuring Big Boo, Rack-Lo & Shillz da Realz)	Thirstin Howl III	2:52
3.	"Walk the Walk, Spit the Spit (Pt. 2)" (featuring Master Fool & Unique London)	Thirstin Howl III	4:21
4.	"Thirsty Greed" (featuring Master Fool)	Thirstin Howl III	1:54
5.	"Brooklyn Hard Rock (Pt. 1)" (featuring Unique London)	Steve Boston	5:07
6.	"The Polorican"	P.F. Cuttin'	3:50
7.	"Babee Farra" (Interlude)	–	1:04
8.	"How Many Babee Movas" (featuring Cita & Dutches New York)	Thirstin Howl III	2:59
9.	"Spit Boxers" (featuring Master Fool)	Steve Boston	3:30
10.	"Dreams of Fucking a Cartoon Bitch"	P.F. Cuttin'	3:25
11.	"Even" (Interlude)	–	1:06
12.	"Watch Deez" (featuring Eminem)	DJ Spinna	3:35
13.	"Brooklyn Hard Rock (Pt. 2)" (featuring Unique London)	Steve Boston	3:41
14.	"I Still Live With My Moms" (featuring Master Fool)	Thirstin Howl III	4:05
15.	"I Wanna Watch" (featuring Unique London)	Will Tell	2:31
16.	"John They're Stealing" (featuring Rack-Lo)	Thirstin Howl III	4:21
17.	"Keep On Cluckin'" (featuring Master Fool)	Thirstin Howl III	2:40
18.	"The Alaskan Fisherman" (featuring Father Time & God Forbid)	Thirstin Howl III	3:17

== Personnel ==
Contributors
Producers
Producers	Thirstin Howl III, Steve Boston, Will Tell, P.F. Cuttin', DJ Spinna
Executive Producers	Thirstin Howl III
Performers
Lead vocals and rapping	Thirstin Howl III, Disco, Unique London, Big Boo, Rack-Lo, Shillz Da Realz, Master Fool, Cita, Dutches New York, Eminem, Father Time, God Forbid
Technicians
Mixing	P.F. Cuttin', DJ Spinna, Will Tell

== Chart positions ==
Billboard Music Charts - "I Still Live With My Moms"
Year	Chart Name	Peak Position
2000	Hot Rap Singles	No. 42

Billboard Music Charts - "The Polorican"
Year	Chart Name	Peak Position
2000	Hot Rap Singles	No. 46
