= Funcrusher =

EP by Company Flow

EP by Company Flow
- Released: 1995
- Genre: Hip-hop
- Label: Official
- Producers: El-P; Mr. Len

Company Flow chronology
| Funcrusher (1995) | Funcrusher Plus (1997) |

Singles from Funcrusher
- 1. "8 Steps to Perfection" Released: 1996

Funcrusher is the debut EP by the New York underground hip-hop group Company Flow. It was released in 1995 on the group's own label Official Recordings. It sold well for an independently released record, with more than 30,000 copies sold despite only being available on vinyl. It was ranked sixth by album sales of its distributor Big Daddy Music by April 1996. Following the release, the group signed a deal with upstart label Rawkus Records for the release of their acclaimed album Funcrusher Plus, released in 1997, which includes all the tracks from Funcrusher (the CD edition omits "Corners '94").

== Track listing ==
| # | Title | Producer(s) | Performer (s) |
|---|---|---|---|
| 1 | "Bad Touch Example" | El-P | Bigg Jus, El-P |
| 2 | "8 Steps to Perfection" | El-P | Bigg Jus, El-P |
| 3 | "Vital Nerve" | El-P | El-P, BMS |
| 4 | "Silence" | El-P | Bigg Jus |
| 5 | "Corners '94" | El-P | El-P |
| 6 | "Definitive" | El-P | El-P, Bigg Jus |
| 7 | "Krazy Kings" | El-P | Bigg Jus |
| 8 | "Lencorcism" | Mr. Len | *Interlude* |
