= Little Johnny from the Hospitul: Breaks & Instrumentals Vol.1 =

Little Johnny from the Hospitul: Breaks & Instrumentuls Vol.1

Studio album by Company Flow
- Released: June 15, 1999
- Recorded: 1998–99
- Genre: Instrumental hip-hop
- Length: 60:36
- Label: Rawkus
- Producer: El-P; Mr. Len

Company Flow chronology
Funcrusher Plus (1997)	Little Johnny from the Hospitul: Breaks & Instrumentuls Vol.1 (1999)	DPA (As Seen On TV) (2000)

Little Johnny from the Hospitul: Breaks & Instrumentuls Vol.1 is the second and final studio album by American hip-hop group Company Flow, released in 1999. The record itself is an instrumental album which differs from the group's previous work. It peaked at number 29 on the UK R&B Albums Chart.

== Background ==
Member Bigg Jus left the group before the album's creation, leaving Company Flow back down to its original core two members, El-P and Mr. Len.

Despite not being officially released as singles, the songs "Workers Needed" and "Blackout" originally appeared on the CD version of the group's single "End To End Burners," released the previous year, with vast differences to the album versions of both songs. "Workers Needed" was originally 4:59 and featured a spoken word intro from El-P and BMS that lasted for a minute and seven seconds. El-P and BMS's vocals were removed and the intro was cut down on the final version, cutting the track down by over 40 seconds. "Blackout" was originally a minute longer than the album version and featured scratching by Mr. Len, but it was cut down in length and the scratching was removed on the final version.

== Critical reception ==
Professional ratings
Review scores
Source	Rating
AllMusic	4/5 stars
Robert Christgau	(dud)
City Pages	favorable
The Independent	HHHH
NME	6/10
The New Rolling Stone Album Guide	3/5 stars

Chris Smith of Stylus Magazine gave the album a favorable review, saying, "this is a fine record, and an absolute must for fans of oddball, rule-breaking hip-hop production." Ron Hart of CMJ New Music Report said, "El Producto and DJ Mr. Len — now the group's sole members — twist up a series of instrumental tracks while maintaining breaks steady enough for rhyming and b-boy poppin' and lockin'." Charles Aaron of Spin called it "the group's most skilled production work yet, layering meticulously warped electro passages and sinister guitar riffs amid vivid, gritty beats."

In 2015, Fact placed it at number 48 on the "100 Best Indie Hip-Hop Records of All Time" list.

== Track listing ==
No.	Title	Length
1.	"Comp"	1:43
2.	"Suzy Pulled a Pistol on Henry"	5:17
3.	"Friend vs. Friend"	5:14
4.	"Linoleum"	4:16
5.	"Bee Aware"	5:56
6.	"Workers Needed"	4:16
7.	"# Nine"	2:01
8.	"Gigapet Epiphany"	4:21
9.	"BMS Digital"	4:05
10.	"No Lock"	0:39
11.	"Shadows Drown"	4:51
12.	"Worker Ant Uprise"	5:44
13.	"Indelible Hybrid"	0:40
14.	"World of Garbage"	4:40
15.	"Blackout"	2:08
16.	"Happy Happy Joy Kill"	4:45

Note: On the physical editions of the album, track 12 is spelled "Wurker Ant Uprise".

== Charts ==
Chart	Peak position
UK R&B Albums (OCC)	29
