= Pity the Fool =

Studio album by Mr. Len
- Released: 2001
- Genre: Hip-hop
- Label: Matador

Mr. Len chronology
What the Fuck/Straight (2000)	Pity the Fool (2001)	Class X, A Tribute to Company Flow (2003)

Pity the Fool: Experiments in Therapy Behind the Mask of Music While Handing Out Dummy Smacks is an album by the American musician Mr. Len, released in 2001.

== Production ==
Mr. Len wanted to create serious, dark tracks as well as light-hearted, goofy ones. The album contains the first solo contributions from Jean Grae. "Taco Day", one of Grae's tracks, is about a high school shooting; the first version contained samples from Philip Glass's soundtrack to Mishima: A Life in Four Chapters, which Matador Records was unable to license. Mr. Len acknowledged that he did not attempt to clear the samples, stating that he most often risks it due to financial concerns. Matador was forced to recall the album. The album title refers to the smacks one would inflict on a childhood friend for saying something stupid.

== Critical reception ==
Professional ratings
Review scores
Source	Rating
AllMusic	3/5 stars
Pitchfork	8.2/10
RapReviews	7/10
Spin	7/10

Pitchfork said, "The interludes cut up the beat nicely, keeping the horns sounding persistent and fresh. Len is clearly in touch with his ass, and makes it known with his mastery of beat-dynamics, modulating them by adding choruses, bridges, or just letting a bassline drop out of the mix, to leave only a breakbeat." The Star-Ledger noted the "scrambled, old-school party tunes, distorted and deeply funky, harrowing confessions and rage-filled feminist battle rhymes". Spin stated that the album "sounds like an exuberant, rum-soaked Irish wake." The Times praised the "X-rated wordplay" of "Girl (Got to Give It to Me)".

Amy Phillips, in The Village Voice, called "Taco Day" "the closest to a female version of Eminem I've ever heard." AllMusic concluded that "Pity the Fool is incredibly ambitious; it almost seems as if Mr. Len is trying to condense any and everything a DJ can do into one not-so-tidy package." Chuck Eddy listed Pity the Fool among the best albums of 2001.

== Track listing ==
No.	Title	Artist	Length
1.	"This Morning"	The Juggaknots
2.	"Get Loose"	MassInfluence
3.	"The Hurt"	Jean Grae featuring Murs
4.	"Untitled"
5.	"Straight"	Q-Unique of the Arsonists
6.	"Girl (Got to Give It to Me)"	Lord Sear
7.	"Taco Day"	Jean Grae featuring the Melon Bayside High Drama Club
8.	"Force Fed"	Agents of Man featuring Amplifire
9.	"Untitled"
10.	"Bring It to Me"	D-Stroy
11.	"What the F@$k?!? (Gritty Version)"	Mr Live
12.	"Untitled"
13.	"Love Venom"	The Brewin & Jean Grae
14.	"Dummy Snacks"	Mr Live & Chubb Rock
15.	"Untitled"
16.	"Family Matters"	Kice of Course & Steady Roc
17.	"Untitled"	Jean Grae
