= Dallas Penn =

American fashion designer and musician (1970–2024)

- Born: 28 September 1969; Queens, New York, U.S.
- Died: April 30, 2024 (aged 53)
- Education: Brooklyn Technical High School (did not complete); City-As-School High School
- Occupations: Fashion designer, sneaker head, musician, internet personality
- Years active: 1984–2024
- Spouse: Susan DeCarava Penn

Dallas Penn (September 28, 1969 – April 30, 2024) was an American fashion designer, sneaker head, musician and internet personality.

== Early life and education ==
Penn, a native of Queens, New York, was born on September 28, 1969. Penn attended the Brooklyn Technical High School before being transferred to City-As-School High School. At City-As, he got an internship as an interior designer. Penn, according to Complex, was stealing cars at the time and would sometimes drive stolen vehicles to school.

== Career ==
Penn started his career in 1984. He gave up his hobby of collecting comic books to focus on fashion. He was said to have been a member of the Decepticons gang. He was also a member of the Lo Lifes Crew, a Brooklyn subculture who wore a considerable amount of Polo apparel. In fact, Penn's fashion sense was the subject of a New York Times feature story entitled "Are You a Sneakerhead?" in May 2021.

Penn was a co-host on the Combat Jack show. He was known for his early work in Hip Hop fashion and internet streaming.

Penn was also a longtime project manager for New York City Department of Design and Construction, and according to a proclamation honoring Penn issued by Mayor Eric Adams, he "was among those who toiled tirelessly to clear the World Trade Center site" after the 9/11 attacks. Penn was also "a stalwart union activist," serving as executive chair and delegate of Chapter 4 Local 375 District Council 37."

== Personal life and death ==
Penn suffered from type 2 diabetes. He was married to Susan DeCarava Penn. He died on May 1, 2024, at age 53. Rob Swift paid tribute to Penn, saying "Some ... won’t realize how much of a trailblazer you were in Hip Hop... ...It was you who introduced me and many of my peers to internet streaming in the ‘90s. Thank you for your contributions to our culture. I’ll always remember your smile."

== Discography ==
- 63/19 Album - "Rap Genius" (ft. Lakutis, Dallas Penn, DVS, and Meyhem Lauren) (prod. Amaze 88)
