= Jarret Myer =

American media entrepreneur (born 1973)

- Born: February 6, 1973 (age 53)
- Occupation: Media entrepreneur
- Known for: Rawkus Records, Uproxx

Jarret Myer (born February 6, 1973) is an American media entrepreneur who co-founded the record label Rawkus Records, the YouTube talent company Big Frame, and the digital media brand Uproxx. Since the sale of Uproxx to Woven Digital in 2014, Myer has served as Woven Digital's general manager of publishing.

== Rawkus Records ==
Myer founded independent hip hop label Rawkus Records with partners Brian Brater and James Murdoch in 1996. Myer met his cofounders while attending Horace Mann School. The label's high-volume model of 12-inch releases was based on the strategy of punk rock music labels like SST and Victory. The label became known for producing up-and-coming hip hop artists. Myer and Brater scouted and signed all of the label's acts themselves, including Mos Def and Talib Kweli. The label received financial support first from News Corp and then MCA from 2002 until MCA was absorbed by Interscope Geffen A&M Records in 2004.

Myer was named on New York magazine's "35 Under 35" list in 2000 for his work with Rawkus Records.

== Uproxx ==
Myer co-founded Uproxx Media in 2008 and served as its CEO until its sale to Woven Digital in 2014.

== Big Frame ==
Myer founded Big Frame with partners Steve Raymond, Brian Brater and Sarah Evershed in 2011.
