= Shabaam Sahdeeq =

American rapper

- Also known as: S Double, S-Dub
- Born: Marcus Vialva; January 13, 1974 (age 52)
- Origin: Brooklyn, New York, U.S.
- Genres: Underground Rap
- Years active: 1996–present
- Label: Marvial Entertainment
- Website: http://www.shabaam-sahdeeq.com

Marcus Vialva (born January 13, 1974), better known by his stage name Shabaam Sahdeeq, is an American alternative hip hop artist from Brooklyn, New York City. He appeared with Rawkus Records and was featured alongside artists including Busta Rhymes, Redman, Method Man, Kool G Rap, Common, Mos Def and Eminem. He worked on the Soundbombing and Lyricist Lounge series in the late 1990s and the early 2000s. In 1998, Sahdeeq collaborated with DJ Spinna, Mr. Complex and Apani B to form the hip-hop collective Polyrhythm Addicts, a supergroup.

== Career ==
In 1999, Sahdeeq collaborated with DJ Spinna, Mr. Complex and Apani B to form the hip-hop collective Polyrhythm Addicts. A supergroup renowned for its role in the rise of late '90s indie hip-hop. The single "Not Your Ordinary" paved the way for their first album, Rhyme Related, which was released on June 9, 1999, was referred to as "saturated with quality from top to bottom". After this success, the group disbanded to focus on their individual careers.

In Sahdeeq's solo career, he featured alongside rappers Busta Rhymes, Redman, Method Man, Kool G Rap, Common, Mos Def and Eminem. His distinct voice and delivery led to mainstream success on the "Simon Says" Remix alongside label mate Pharoahe Monch. Sahdeeq is also recognized for his work on the Sound Bombing and Lyricist Lounge series. At this point he was in position to launch his solo album on Rawkus Records. Unfortunately, due to the label's loss of distribution, his solo project was never released and he would ask for a release from the label to solidify a new situation with the up and coming label Raptivism. In 2001 the artist re-emerged with the single "Bubbling" on Raptivism Records which received radio airplay. This track featured on his first solo LP Never Say Never. Four years later he released the "solid but not earth-shattering" Strategize: The Mixtape Album.

Seven years after their first album, Sahdeeq re-united with Spinna and Complex, with Tiye Phoenix replacing Apani B. Fly Emcee, to bring out Breaking Glass. The Polyrhythm Addicts' long awaited second album was released on April 24, 2007 under Babygrande Records.

== Discography ==
Polyrhythm Addicts	Released
Rhyme Related	June 9, 1999
Break Glass	April 24, 2007

Shabaam Sahdeeq	Released
3D bw Eat This Year	2000
Arabian Nights bw Side 2 Side	1997
Sound Clash bw 5 star Generals	1998
R you Ready bw Concrete	1999

Raptivism Records	Year
Never Say Never	2001

Comp/Mixtapes	Date
Soundbombing	1997
Soundbombing 2	1999
Lyricist Lounge Volume One	1998
Hip Hop Independents Day Vol. 1	1998
Dub Sessions Vol. 01	1999
The Beyond Real Experience	1999
Hip Hop Soul Party Episode IV	2000
City of God mix tape	2005
Recognize now or realize later	2006
Strategize The Mixtape Album	2006
Lord of War Mixtape	2006/7
Relentless 1	2009
Relentless 2	2012
Off Parole	2010
Degrees of Separation	2012
