= Thirstin Howl III =

American rapper

Thirstin Howl the 3rd
- Born: Victor DeJesus
- Origin: Brownsville, Brooklyn, New York, New York, U.S.
- Genre: Hip hop
- Occupations: Rapper; Music Producer; Author; Fashion Entrepreneur/Designer
- Years active: 1997–present
- Labels: Skillionaire Enterprises; LandSpeed Records
- Website: Thirstin Howl The 3rd

Victor DeJesus, better known by his stage name Thirstin Howl the 3rd, is an American rapper, producer, author and entrepreneur from Brownsville, Brooklyn. Howl owns and operates his own label, Skillionaire Enterprises. He is also a founding member of the Lo Lifes.

== Lo Lifes ==
In 1988, Thirstin Howl the 3rd and Rack-Lo co-founded the Lo Lifes, a Ralph Lauren Polo "boosting" (shoplifting) crew that formed from the union of two smaller crews: Ralphie's Kids from Crown Heights and Polo USA (United Shoplifters Association) from Brownsville. In the original 2016 edition of Howl's book Bury Me With the Lo On (a second edition was released in 2017), Howl writes:

"Every day was a fashion show and a shoplifting spree throughout upstate malls and Manhattan stores."

Howl has also stated of the Lo Lifes:

“We were like fight club meets the runway. It feels accomplished to us, we feel like we did something instead of being looked at as hoodlums and thieves in the past. Through that, we see something we created live longer than we’re actually gonna live or live beyond our time and passed down for generations and it’s become traditional."

Bury Me With the Lo On takes its name from the lyrics of Howl's song, "The Polo Rican" ("When I die, bury me with the Lo on / Official to the death, all eternity and so on"), as well as a photo that appears in the book of a Lo Life member wearing a Polo ski sweater in his coffin.

In August 2015 Howl launched a Lo Life clothing line inspired by vintage Ralph Lauren, in partnership with Willie Esco of Coogi.

== Music career ==
Howl was first recognized by music publications in 1997, when he was profiled in The Source's Unsigned Hype column, but continued to exercise creative control by producing his own music and videos. His music has been featured on Lyricist Lounge, Volume One (“Bathroom Cipher”) and Soundbombing II (“Brooklyn Hardrock”).

Of Puerto Rican descent, Howl is bilingual and is known for rapping in both Spanish and English. With his catalogue including tracks about topics as various as living with his mom, Hanna-Barbera character Penelope Pitstop, and Ralph Lauren Polo, he has been described by Nate Patrin of Stereogum as "one of the least-precedented, never-imitated voices in underground hip-hop."

== Discography ==
=== Studio albums ===
- Skillionaire (1999)
- Skillosopher (2000)
- Serial Skiller (2001)
- Skilligan's Island (2002)
- Fire & Ice (2003) with Father Time & Godforbid as Alaskan Fishermen
- Skillitary (2004)
- La Cura (2006)
- Lo Down & Dirty with Rack-Lo (2006)
- Natural Born Skiller (2011)
- Mami & Papi (2013) with Hurricane G
- Survival of the Skillest (2013)
- Skillmatic (2017)
- Thoughts Skillustrated (2023)

=== Mixtapes ===
- Skilluminaty (2005)
- The Lo-Life General (2006)
- Chuletas Con Tostones (2009)
- Skill Recognize Skill with J-Love (2010)
- Brother Lo The 37th Chamber (200?)

=== Compilations ===
- Love And Loyalty - The Sound Track (2000)
- Licensed to Skill (2003)

=== Singles ===
- "Brooklyn Hard Rock" (12") (1999)
- "The Polorican" (12") (1999)

=== Featured guest appearances ===
- Statik Selektah - "Ralph Lauren’s Closet” (from the album The Balancing Act) (2020)
- “New York Gangsters” (Necro featuring Tragedy Khadafi, Hec Teck, Capone, Dom Pachino, Thirstin Howl III, Raze The Ratchet, Willie Stubz, Chris Rivers, and Kurious Jorge) from Sadist Hitz, Vol. 2
- The Nicewun JM - “Underground Livin’” (from the album Celebratin’ Hip Hop... Over Here) (2021)
- The Mighty Rhino - “We Gon’ Stomp Shit” (also featuring Tragedy Khadafi, Guilty Simpson, Bonshah, Fraction and Ultra Magnus, from the album To Relieve The Sorrow-Laden Heart) (2022)
- Noyz Narcos - "Rvssian Bag" (also featuring Gast and Click Head, from the album Virus) (2022)
