= Lyricist Lounge 2 =

2000 hip-hop compilation album

Compilation album by Rawkus Records
- Released: November 28, 2000
- Studio: Chung King Studios; Battery Studios; Mirror Image Recorders; Right Track Recording; Rezonant Productions; D-Lo Studio; Ablosute Audio; Electric Lady Studios; Cutting Room; Studio A; Sound on Sound Studios; Soundcastle; Rick N' Reel; D&D Studios; Base Line; Tree Sound Studios; Lyricist Lounge Studios
- Genre: Hip-hop
- Length: 1:10:36
- Label: Rawkus Records
- Producer: Anthony Marshall (exec.); Danny Castro (exec.); Jacob Septimus (exec.); Perry Landesberg (exec.); Alchemist; Ayatollah; DJ Mighty Mi; DJ Premier; DJ Roddy Rod; Erick Sermon; Hi-Tek; Jay Dee; Madlib; Rockwilder; Scott Storch

Rawkus Records chronology
Soundbombing 2 (1999)	Lyricist Lounge 2 (2000)	Soundbombing III (2002)

Professional ratings
Review scores
Source	Rating
AllMusic	4/5 stars
HipHopDX	4.5/5
RapReviews	7/10
Robert Christgau	A−
The Guardian	4/5 stars

Lyricist Lounge 2 is the fourth hip-hop compilation album by American record label Rawkus Records. It was released on November 28, 2000, as the second installment of Lyricist Lounge album series, based on New York's Lyricist Lounge showcases.

Recording sessions took place at Chung King Studios, Battery Studios, Mirror Image Recorders, Right Track Recording, Rezonant Productions, D-Lo Studio, Ablosute Audio, Electric Lady Studios, Cutting Room, Studio A, Sound on Sound Studios, Sound Castle, Rick N' Reel, D&D Studios, Base Line, Tree Sound Studios and Lyricist Lounge Studios.

Production was handled by Hi-Tek, Erick Sermon, The Alchemist, Ayatollah, DJ Mighty Mi, DJ Premier, DJ Roddy Rod, J Dilla, Madlib, Rockwilder and Scott Storch, with Danny Castro, Ant Marshall, Perry Landsberg and Jacob Septimus serving as executive producers.

It features contributions from Mos Def, Q-Tip, Beanie Sigel, the late Big L, Big Noyd, Cobra Red, C-Town, dead prez, Dilated Peoples, Erick Sermon, Ghostface Killah, Guilty (Consequence and Menace), JT Money, Kool G Rap, Macy Gray, Master Fuol, M.O.P., Nate Dogg, the late Notorious B.I.G., Pastor Troy, Pharoahe Monch, Phil Da Agony, Planet Asia, Prodigy, Punchline, Redman, Royce da 5'9", Saukrates, Smif-N-Wessun, Sy Scott, Talib Kweli and Wordsworth among others.

The album debuted at number 33 on the Billboard 200 and number 7 on the Top R&B/Hip-Hop Albums in the United States. It was preceded by three singles: "Oh No", "Ms. Fat Booty 2" and "Get Up". "Oh No" peaked at #83 on the Billboard Hot 100, #22 on the Hot R&B/Hip-Hop Songs and topped the Hot Rap Songs. "Ms. Fat Booty 2" reached #15 on the Hot Rap Songs, and "Get Up" made it to #90 on the hot R&B/Hip-Hop Songs and #9 on the Hot Rap Songs in the US.

Despite its being one of Rawkus' most commercially successful releases, Lyricist Lounge 2 drew criticisms from underground fans, mainly due to the album's more commercial sound, and also because of its focus on established artists, unlike the first installment, which largely featured up-and-coming MC's.

== Track listing ==
No.	Title	Writer(s)	Producer(s)	Length
1.	"16 Bars (Live at the Lyricist Lounge 1993)" (performed by Notorious B.I.G.)	Christopher Wallace		1:03
2.	"Oh No" (performed by Mos Def, Pharoahe Monch and Nate Dogg)	Dante Smith; Troy Jamerson; Nathaniel Hale; Dana Stinson	Rockwilder	3:59
3.	"Makin' It Blend" (performed by Q-Tip and Wordsworth)	Jonathan Davis; Vinson Johnson; Rodrick Bridges	DJ Roddy Rod	3:54
4.	"Get Up" (performed by Cocoa Brovaz)	Darrell Yates; Tekomin Williams; Tony Cottrell	Hi-Tek	3:52
5.	"Get That Dough" (performed by Beanie Sigel)	Dwight Grant; Cottrell	Hi-Tek	4:03
6.	"Let's Grow" (performed by Royce da 5'9")	Ryan Montgomery; James Yancey	Jay Dee	3:46
7.	"Ms. Fat Booty 2" (performed by Mos Def and Ghostface Killah)	Smith; Dennis Coles; Lamont Dorrell	Ayatollah	3:28
8.	"W.K.Y.A." (performed by Saukrates and Redman)	Karl Wailoo; Reggie Noble; Erick Sermon	Erick Sermon	4:30
9.	"Sharp Shooters" (performed by Talib Kweli and dead prez)	Talib Greene; Clayton Gavin; Lavonne Alford; Cottrell	Hi-Tek	4:17
10.	"Legendary Street Team" (performed by Kool G Rap and M.O.P.)	Nathaniel Wilson; Eric Murray; Jamal Grinnage; Milo Berger	DJ Mighty Mi	4:03
11.	"The Grimy Way" (performed by Big Noyd and Prodigy)	Tajuan Perry; Albert Johnson; Alan Maman	Alchemist	4:10
12.	"Battle" (performed by Erick Sermon and Sy Scott)	Sermon; Syheed Scott	Erick Sermon	3:57
13.	"Da Cipha Interlude" (performed by Punchline, Cobra Red, Planet Asia, Guilty (Consequence & Menace) and Phil Da Agony)		Madlib	2:05
14.	"Still Here" (performed by Big L and C-Town)	Lamont Coleman; Cottrell	Hi-Tek	3:52
15.	"Right and Exact" (performed by Dilated Peoples)	Michael Perretta; Rakaa Taylor; Chris Oroc; Maman	Alchemist	3:46
16.	"Watcha" (performed by Master Fúol, JT Money and Pastor Troy)	T. Matthews; Jeffrey Thompkins; Micah Troy; Scott Storch	Scott Storch	4:33
17.	"I've Committed Murder (Gang Starr Remix)" (performed by Macy Gray and Mos Def)	Natalie McIntyre; Smith; Chris Martin; Keith Elam	DJ Premier; GuRu (co.)	4:13
18.	"Live at the Lounge (Outro)" (performed by Q-Tip)	Davis		0:53
38.	"Legendary Street Team 2" (performed by Kool G Rap and M.O.P.)	Wilson; Murray; Grinnage; Dominick Lamb	Nottz	4:27
Total length:				1:10:36

Notes

- Track 38 is a hidden track with tracks 19 to 37 being blank tracks of silence.

== Personnel ==
- Alon Cohen – engineering
- Chris Conway – engineering
- Chris Soul – engineering
- Dante "Mos Def" Smith – engineering
- Dave Dar – engineering
- Dexter Thibou – engineering
- Doug Wilson – engineering
- Eddie Sancho – engineering
- Erick Sermon – engineering
- Franky "Nitty" Pimental – engineering
- Jochris – engineering, photography
- Ken "Duro" Ifill – engineering
- Mike Koch – engineering
- Nastee – engineering
- Reza Safinia – engineering
- Scott Weatherwax – engineering
- Steve Sola – engineering
- Tim Nitz – engineering
- Tom Brick – engineering
- Tony "Hi-Tek" Cottrell – engineering
- Troy Hightower – engineering
- Chris Athens – mastering
- Anthony Marshall – executive producer
- Danny Castro – executive producer
- Jacob Septimus – executive producer, photography
- Perry Landesberg – executive producer
- Shawn "Blak Shawn" Glenn – co-executive producer
- Willo Perron – art direction, design, graphics, photography
- Michael Schreiber – photography
- Ray Janos – lacquer cut

== Charts ==
Chart (2000−2001)	Peak position
UK R&B Albums (OCC)	15
US Billboard 200	33
US Top R&B/Hip-Hop Albums (Billboard)	7
