= Home Field Advantage (album) =

Studio album by the High & Mighty
- Released: August 24, 1999
- Recorded: 1997–1999
- Studio: The Muthafuckin' Spot on Lexington
- Genre: Hip hop
- Length: 62:15
- Label: Rawkus
- Producer: Mr. Eon (exec.); DJ Mighty Mi (also exec.); Alchemist; Reef

The High & Mighty chronology
Home Field Advantage (1999)	Porn Again (2001)

Singles from Home Field Advantage
- 1. "Open Mic Night/The Meaning" Released: December 22, 1997; 2. "B-Boy Document 1999" Released: July 27, 1999; 3. "Dirty Decibels" Released: November 22, 1999; 4. "The Dick Starbuck" Released: July 24, 2000

Professional ratings
Review scores
Source	Rating
AllMusic	4/5 stars
Robert Christgau	(1-star Honorable Mention)
Muzik	4/5 stars
RapReviews	8.5/10
The Source	3/5 stars
Spin	7/10

Home Field Advantage is the debut studio album by American hip hop group the High & Mighty. It was released on August 24, 1999, via Rawkus Records. The recording sessions took place at the Muthafuckin' Spot on Lexington. The album was produced mostly by member DJ Mighty Mi, but also featured production from Alchemist and Reef. It features guest appearances from Bobbito García, Cage, Defari, Eminem, Evidence, Kool Keith, Mad Skillz, Mos Def, Pharoahe Monch, Thirstin Howl III, What? What? and Wordsworth. The album peaked at number 193 on the Billboard 200, number 45 on the Top R&B/Hip-Hop Albums, and number 11 on the Heatseekers Albums in the United States. The single "B-Boy Document '99" reached number 63 on the Hot R&B/Hip-Hop Songs, number 7 on the Hot Rap Songs. The single "Dick Starbuck "Porno Detective"" made it to number 37 on the Hot Rap Songs.

== Track listing ==
No.	Title	Writer(s)	Producer(s)	Length
1.	"Tip Off Time" (Intro)	Eric Meltzer; Milo Berger	DJ Mighty Mi	1:30
2.	"Dirty Decibels" (featuring Pharoahe Monch)	Meltzer; Troy Jamerson; Berger	DJ Mighty Mi	3:53
3.	"Top Prospects" (featuring Evidence and Defari)	Meltzer; Michael Perretta; Duane Johnson; Alan Maman	The Alchemist	3:45
4.	"Dick Starbuck "Porno Detective""	Meltzer; Berger; Michael Vernon; DeLisle Harper; Glen LeFleur; Joe Jammer; Pete Wingfield; Greg Mays; Darryl Barnes	DJ Mighty Mi	3:44
5.	"B-Boy Document '99" (featuring Mos Def and Mad Skillz)	Meltzer; Dante Smith; Donnie Lewis; Berger; Brad Baker; Lance Quinn; Joe Thomas	DJ Mighty Mi	3:54
6.	"The Last Hit" (featuring Eminem)	Meltzer; Marshall Mathers; Berger	DJ Mighty Mi	4:19
7.	"Ay Yo (skit)" (featuring Lord Sear and Paul Rosenberg)			0:26
8.	"Hot Spittable"	Meltzer; Berger	DJ Mighty Mi	4:05
9.	"The Meaning"	Meltzer; Berger	DJ Mighty Mi	4:07
10.	"In-Outs" (featuring Cage)	Meltzer; Chris Palko; Berger	DJ Mighty Mi	3:41
11.	"Papers Please (skit)" (skit)			0:45
12.	"Shaquan & Eon" (featuring Mad Skillz)	Meltzer; Lewis; Berger	DJ Mighty Mi	3:58
13.	"The Half"	Meltzer; Robert F. Tewlow	Reef	3:56
14.	"Hands On Experience, Pt. II" (featuring Kool Keith, What? What? and Bobbito García)	Meltzer; Keith Thornton; Tsidi Ibrahim; Bobbito García; Berger	DJ Mighty Mi	5:01
15.	"Weed"	Meltzer; Tewlow; Andrew Marks; London McDaniels	Reef	3:30
16.	"Newman (skit)"			1:12
17.	"Open Mic Night (Remix)" (featuring Wordsworth and Thirstin Howl III)	Meltzer; Vinson Johnson; Victor DeJesus; Maman; Eric Barrier; William Griffin; Charles Bobbit; James Brown; Bobby Byrd	The Alchemist	3:41
18.	"Mind, Soul & Body"	Meltzer; Berger	DJ Mighty Mi	3:40
19.	"Friendly Game of Football"	Meltzer; Berger	DJ Mighty Mi	3:08
Total length:				1:02:15

Notes

- Track 4 contains a sample of "Get This Thing Down" written by Michael Vernon, DeLisle Harper, Glen LeFleur, Joe Jammer and Pete Wingfield and performed by Olympic Runners, and a sample of "No Delayin'" written by Gregory Mays and Darryl Barnes and performed by Nice & Smooth.
- Track 5 contains a sample of "Polarizer" written by Brad Baker, Lance Quinn and Joe Thomas and performed by Joe Thomas.
- Track 15 contains a sample of "Chanting" written by Andrew Marks and London McDaniels and performed by Rasa.
- Track 17 contains a sample of "Been A Long Time" written by Eric Barrier, William Griffin, Charles Bobbit, James Brown and Bobby Byrd and performed by Rakim.

== Personnel ==
Credits adapted from liner notes, AllMusic, ASCAP and Discogs.

- Eric "Mr. Eon" Meltzer — vocals, executive producer, sleeve notes
- Milo "DJ Mighty Mi" Berger — scratches (track 18), producer (tracks: 1, 2, 4–6, 8–10, 12, 14, 18, 19), recording, mixing (tracks: 1, 2, 4, 6, 8–10, 12, 14, 18, 19), executive producer, sleeve notes
- Troy "Pharoahe Monch" Jamerson — vocals (track 2)
- Michael "Evidence" Perretta — vocals (track 3)
- Duane "Defari" Johnson — vocals (track 3)
- Rashida Jones — additional vocals (track 4)
- She Speaks — additional vocals (tracks: 4, 8)
- Dante "Mos Def" Smith — vocals (track 5)
- Donnie "Mad Skillz" Lewis — vocals (tracks: 5, 12)
- Marshall "Eminem" Mathers — vocals (track 6)
- Steve "Lord Sear" Watson — vocals (track 7), beatboxing (track 19)
- Paul Rosenberg — vocals (track 7)
- Chris "Cage" Palko — vocals (track 10)
- Keith Matthew "Kool Keith" Thornton — vocals (track 14)
- Tsidi "Jean Grae" Ibrahim — vocals (track 14)
- Bobbito Garcia — vocals (track 14)
- Vinson "Wordsworth" Johnson — vocals (track 17)
- Victor "Thirstin Howl III" DeJesus — vocals (track 17)
- Jonathan Miles "Shecky Green" Shecter — voice (track 19)
- Evan "DJ EV" Hitch — scratches (track 4)
- Rob "Reef" Tewlow — additional programming (track 4), drum programming (track 14), producer & mixing (tracks: 13, 15)
- Mark Ronson — additional programming (track 4)
- Vere Isaacs — bass (tracks: 5, 6)
- Sébastien "DJ Sebb" Vuignier — scratches (track 5)
- DJ Daze — scratches (tracks: 6, 9, 12, 13, 18)
- Daniel Alan "The Alchemist" Maman — producer & mixing (tracks: 3, 17)
- Kieran Walsh — engineering (tracks: 1, 2, 5, 6, 10)
- Miles "DJ Nastee" Balochian — engineering (tracks: 4, 14)
- Ken "Duro" Ifill — mixing (track 5)
- Bob Brown — engineering (track 8)
- Elliott Thomas — engineering (tracks: 9, 13, 17–19)
- Chris Theis — engineering (track 15)
- Tim Ronan — art direction, graphic design
- Arnold Steiner — graphic design
- Franck Khalfoun — photography

== Charts ==
Chart (1998)	Peak position
US Billboard 200	193
US Top R&B Albums (Billboard)	45
US Heatseekers Albums (Billboard)	11
