= Funcrusher Plus =

Studio album by Company Flow
- Released: July 22, 1997
- Recorded: 1994–97
- Studio: Ozone; No Mystery (New York)
- Genre: East Coast hip-hop; underground hip-hop; progressive rap
- Length: 73:52
- Label: Rawkus
- Producer: Company Flow

Company Flow chronology
Funcrusher (1995)	Funcrusher Plus (1997)	Little Johnny from the Hospitul: Breaks & Instrumentals Vol.1 (1999)

Singles from Funcrusher Plus
- 1. "8 Steps to Perfection" Released: 1996; 2. "Blind" Released: 1997

Funcrusher Plus is the debut studio album by American hip-hop group Company Flow. It was released by Rawkus Records in 1997. In 2009, it was re-released on Definitive Jux. The album has been recognized as "a landmark independent hip-hop release".

== Critical reception ==
Professional ratings
Review scores
Source	Rating
AllMusic	5/5 stars
The Encyclopedia of Popular Music	4/5 stars
Los Angeles Times	4/4 stars
Muzik	10/10
NME	7/10
Pitchfork	9.0/10
PopMatters	9/10
The Rolling Stone Album Guide	3.5/5 stars
Spectrum Culture	4.5/5 stars
Spin	8/10

Jon Dolan of City Pages noted "[Company Flow's] evincing a confrontational critique of 'those signed, big-budget muthafuckas' like none hip-hop has attempted since EPMD's Strictly Business." Andrew Hultkrans of Spin gave the album 8 stars out of 10, commenting that "[the album] deconstructed hip-hop conventions and rebuilt them into a spare, murky, sputtering soundscape." Jeff Weiss of the Los Angeles Times felt that "El-P conjured an apocalyptic minimalism -- the sublimated sound of clanging and cluttered train cars, city grime buried beneath cuticles, and the ghostly smoke of burning blunts." Brian Coleman of CMJ New Music Monthly called it "the most important release of 1997 thus far." The New York Times wrote that Company Flow "rap fast, rude, free-associative boasts and dystopian visions over tracks that mesh raunchy old funk snippets with electronic noise, making hip-hop that's simultaneously propulsive and disorienting."

Nate Patrin of Pitchfork said: "With the exception of the nocturnal crystalline funk of the Bigg Jus-produced 'Lune TNS' and the frequent scratch contributions from secret weapon DJ Mr. Len, Funcrusher Plus' beats bear the mark of El-P's dusty-but-digital aesthetic, which even back then had the same sort of beautiful-dystopia Blade Runner feel that informed Cannibal Ox's The Cold Vein and his own Fantastic Damage a few years later." AllMusic gave the album a perfect 5 star rating, and writer Steve Huey stated: "[Funcrusher Plus] demands intense concentration, but also rewards it, and its advancement of hip-hop as an art form is still being felt. It's difficult, challenging music, to be sure, and it's equally far ahead of its time."

Joseph Schafer of Stereogum said, "Funcrusher Plus made for a hell of an opening salvo, and most emcee/producers would envy having such a record in their discography, but El mostly improved upon his work here later."

On October 4, 2011, "Lune TNS" was chosen by NJ.com as the Song of the Day.

In 2003, Funcrusher Plus ranked at number 84 on Pitchfork's Top 100 Albums of the 1990s list. In 2014, Complex listed the album at number 86 on the 90 Best Rap Albums of the 90s. In 2015, it was chosen by Fact as number 4 on the 100 Best Indie Hip-Hop Records of All Time.

== Track listing ==
No.	Title	Lyrics	Music	Length
1.	"Bad Touch Example"	Justin Ingleton; Jaime Meline	El-P	3:26
2.	"8 Steps to Perfection"	Ingleton; Meline	El-P	4:43
3.	"Collude/Intrude" (featuring J-Treds)	Meline; J-Treds	El-P	5:25
4.	"Blind"	Ingleton; Meline	El-P	3:42
5.	"Silence"	Ingleton	El-P	3:33
6.	"Legends"	Meline	El-P	4:02
7.	"Help Wanted"		El-P	2:13
8.	"Population Control"	Ingleton; Meline; R.A. Thorburn	El-P	4:26
9.	"Lune TNS"	Ingleton	Bigg Jus	3:39
10.	"Definitive"	Meline	El-P	5:47
11.	"Lencorcism"		Mr. Len	0:36
12.	"89.9 Detrimental"	Meline	El-P	1:03
13.	"Vital Nerve" (featuring BMS)	Meline; BMS	El-P	5:01
14.	"Tragedy of War (in III Parts)"	Ingleton; Meline	El-P	3:49
15.	"The Fire in Which You Burn" (featuring The Brewin from the Juggaknots & J-Treds)	Ingleton; Meline; Breezly Brewin; J-Treds	El-P	5:02
16.	"Krazy Kings"	Ingleton	El-P	4:52
17.	"Last Good Sleep"	Meline	Mr. Len, El-P	5:59
18.	"Info Kill II"	Ingleton; Meline	El-P	3:48
19.	"Funcrush Scratch"		Mr. Len	2:48
Total length:				73:52

Notes

- "Population Control" features uncredited vocals from R.A. the Rugged Man
- The vinyl version contains a track originally featured on the Funcrusher EP, titled "Corners '94".

== Personnel ==
- El-P – producer, lead vocals, mixing
- Bigg Jus – producer, lead vocals
- Mr. Len – producer, scratching
- R.A. the Rugged Man – vocals
- J-Treds – vocals
- BMS – vocals
- Breezly Brewin – vocals
- Vassos – recording, engineering, mixing
- Jeff Cordero – recording, engineering, mixing
- Walker Bernard – recording, engineering
- Chris Athens – mastering

== Singles chart positions ==
Year	Song	Hot Dance Music/Maxi-Singles Sales
1997	"Blind"	44
