= Mr. Len =

American DJ

- Born: Leonard Smythe; Bronx, New York, U.S.
- Genres: Hip-hop
- Years active: 1990s–present

Mr. Len (Leonard "Lenny" Smythe) is a hip-hop DJ born in the Bronx, New York. He moved to Hillside, NJ when he was 12 years old. He was a member, with Bigg Jus and El-P, of the underground hip-hop trio Company Flow, which disbanded in the late 1990s. His debut full-length, released on Matador Records in 2001, included guest spots by Jean Grae, Chubb Rock, and Mr. Live. Later he formed a group with Kimani Rogers from The Masterminds named Roosevelt Franklin. He also collaborated with Handsome Boy Modeling School member Prince Paul to produce the faux-doo wop group The Dix. Mr. Len was also a voice actor in the American action comedy television series, Kung Faux.

== Discography ==
=== Mr. Len ===
==== Albums ====
- Pity the Fool: Experiments in Therapy Behind the Mask of Music While Handing Out Dummy Smacks (Matador Records, 2001)
- Class X, A Tribute to Company Flow (Smacks Records, 2004)
- Beats and Things, Vol. 1 (Smacks Records, 2004)
- The Marvels of Yestermorrow (W.A.R. Media, 2013)

==== EPs/singles ====
- This Morning (Matador Records, 1999)
- What the Fuck/Straight (Matador, 2000)

=== Company Flow ===
- Funcrusher (Official Recordings, 1995)
- Funcrusher Plus (Rawkus Records, 1997)
- Little Johnny from the Hospitul: Breaks & Instrumentals Vol.1 (Rawkus Records, 1999)

=== Roosevelt Franklin ===
- Something's Got to Give (Third Earth Music, 2003)

=== The Dix ===
- The Art of Picking Up Women (Smacks Records, 2005)

=== Production/album appearances ===
- Armand Van Helden, “Rock Da Spot”, 2 Future 4 U, Armed Records - 1999
- Roger Sanchez, “Buffalo Gals Stampede [S-Man's Spicy Buffalo Wings Dub]” Maximum House & Garage, EMI Int’l - 1999
- Bill Laswell/Material, "This Morning" feat. Juggaknots, Intonarumori, Palm Pictures Audio - 1999
- The Masterminds, “The Fast Way”, Live From Area 51: The Extraterrestrial Project, Exodus Entertainment - 1999
- Twigy, Seven Dimensions Remix LP (Japanese Release), 2000
- MC Paul Barman, "School Anthem", It's Very Stimulating, Wordsound - 2000
- DJ Krush "Vision Of Art" feat. Company Flow/Scratches by Mr. Len, Zen, Red Int / Red Ink - 2001
- Princess Superstar, "Trouble", Is, Rapster - 2002
- Jean Grae, "What Would I Do" and "Knock", Attack of the Attacking Things, Third Earth Music - 2002
- Prince Paul, “Ralph Nader” skit, Politics of the Business, Razor & Tie - 2003
- Indelible MCs (El-P, J-Treds, Juggaknots), "Weight", Lyricist Lounge Vol. 1, Priority Records - 1999, Re-released 2004
- Jedi Mind Tricks, "Words from Mr. Len 1 & 2", Violent By Design, Landspeed - 2000, Re-released 2004
- Mass Influence, "Analyze" (Single), Boulevard/Nonstop - 2000
- Various Artists, “Hip Hop for Respect” (Single), Rawkus Records - 2000
- Murs, "Take Yo Ass to the Store" (Single), Smacks Records - 2003
- Mr. Dead feat. Sayyid (Anti-Pop), "Dynamic Tension" (Single) 2005
