= Bigg Jus =

American alternative hip hop artist

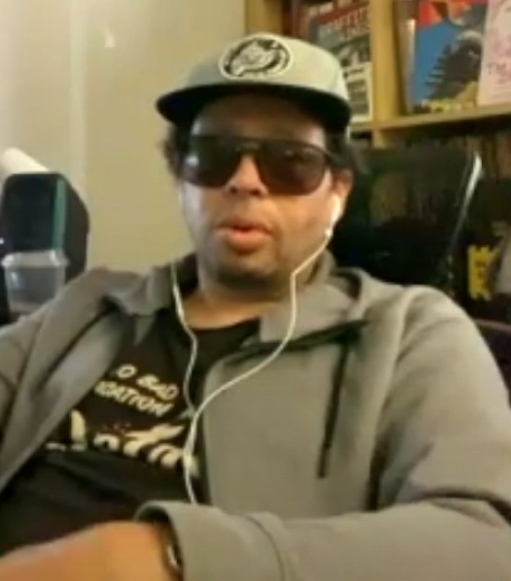
- Bigg Jus in 2024

Background information
- Also known as: Bigg Justoleum, Lune TNS
- Origin: Jamaica, Queens, New York, US
- Genres: Alternative hip hop
- Occupations: Rapper, producer
- Years active: 1993-present
- Labels: Definitive Jux, Sub Verse Music, Big Dada, Mush Records
- Website: www.mushrecords.com/artist/BiggJus

Justin Ingleton, better known by his stage name Bigg Jus, is an American rapper and record producer. He was a member of the critically acclaimed rap group Company Flow along with El-P and Mr. Len. He is also one half of the duo Nephlim Modulation Systems with Orko Eloheim.

== History ==
After the breakup of Company Flow in 2001, Bigg Jus formed the now defunct Sub Verse Music and began to pursue his solo career. He moved to Atlanta, Georgia, where he continued his musical career with his self-produced EP Plantation Rhymes. Moving on to the creation of his first solo album, he put together an album known as Black Mamba Serums. However, in the wake of the September 11 incidents in 2001, he pulled the album just before its release unsatisfied with its content. He went back to the studio and recreated the album to better suit his artistic vision. Nearly 3 years later, in 2004, he released the revised version under the name of Black Mamba Serums v2.0 on Big Dada. Just to prove a point to his listeners, he included the original album mp3s as bonus content.

In a 2006 interview, Bigg Jus said that he and El-P were working on a new Company Flow album to be released later in the year.

Bigg Jus released the solo album, Machines That Make Civilization Fun, on Mush Records in 2012.

== Discography ==
Albums

- Funcrusher Plus (1997) (with El-P & Mr. Len, as Company Flow)
- Black Mamba Serums (Japanese Edition) (2002)
- Woe to Thee O Land Whose King Is a Child (2003) (with Orko Eloheim, as Nephlim Modulation Systems)
- Black Mamba Serums v2.0 (2004)
- Imperial Letters of Protection (2005) (with Orko Eloheim, as Nephlim Modulation Systems)
- Poor People's Day (2005)
- Machines That Make Civilization Fun (2012)

EPs

- Funcrusher (1995) (with El-P & Mr. Len, as Company Flow)
- Plantation Rhymes (2001)
- Insomniac Missile Launcher (2023) (with Fatboi Sharif)

Singles

- "Juvenile Technique" (1994) (with El-P & Mr. Len, as Company Flow)
- "8 Steps to Perfection" (1996) (with El-P & Mr. Len, as Company Flow)
- "Infokill" (1996) (with El-P & Mr. Len, as Company Flow)
- "Blind" (1997) (with El-P & Mr. Len, as Company Flow)
- "End to End Burners... Episode 1" (1998) (with El-P & Mr. Len, as Company Flow)
- "Patriotism" (1999) (with El-P & Mr. Len, as Company Flow)
- "D.P.A. (As Seen on TV)" (2000) (with El-P & Mr. Len, as Company Flow)
- "Black Roses" (2012)

Guest appearances

- Mike Ladd - "Bladerunners" from Welcome to the Afterfuture (1999)
- Neila - "Mercy Refused" from Better Late Than Never (2009)
- Super Chron Flight Brothers - "Emmanuel Goldstein" from Cape Verde (2010)
- Lee Scott - "Beanio" from Gate Clicks Shut (2021)
