= Lo Lifes =

Subculture in Brooklyn, New York

Lo Lifes is a Brooklyn-based movement and street gang founded by a few young street Kids, devoted to the shoplifting and wearing of Polo Ralph Lauren apparel and other fashion brands.

The movement was most prominent in the late 1980s and early 1990s. The group's motto is the "2LLs," which are "love and loyalty".

== History ==
The Lo Lifes were founded in 1988 from two different groups of shoplifters in Brooklyn: Polo U.S.A. (from Brownsville) and Ralphie's Kids (from Crown Heights). The "Lo" in the group's name comes from the word "Polo" in Polo Ralph Lauren, and the group's signature style of dress, called "lo down", meant wearing Ralph Lauren from head to toe. The appeal of Ralph Lauren in particular to members of the group was the brand's preppy reputation. According to rapper Thirstin Howl III, "the clothes were made for the upper-class preppy kids from Yale and Harvard, and you know some kids from the ghetto just took it, remixed it, and we made it our own".

In the late 2000s, Rack-Lo started hosting "Lo Goose on the Deuce" meetups for Lo Lifes on 42nd Street ("The Deuce"). These events involved socializing, street fashion photography, attending movies, and rap music.

Early on, much of the group's designer attire was "boosted", or shoplifted, using tactics such as "million-man rushes" to procure garments from department stores. In a 2015 interview, Rack-Lo estimated that seventy-five percent of early Lo Lifes participated in shoplifting while the remainder could afford the clothing from their more regular jobs. Sometimes clothing was "boosted" for resale, and sometimes members "racked", or shoplifted for personal use. Because of these practices, the group in its early history has been described as a gang. Over the years, the emphasis on shoplifting within the subculture has decreased, creating what has been described as a generational divide among members. Many new members can't relate to members who are now at the age of retirement, explaining to them their glory days of shoplifting. The disconnect has led many members to walk away.

Although no longer as active, the Lo Life subculture has spread across the globe, with a presence in Europe, Australia, Brazil, and Japan. The current incarnation of "Lo Goose on the Deuce" and the annual Lo-Life barbecue both draw this international crowd.

The original Lo-Life symbol was created by Rudy Lo, which is featured and used in much of Lo Life imagery.

Many Lo Lifes claim that they built Ralph Lauren's street credibility; this is usually refuted by showing the timeline of Ralph's success since 1967, and the formation of the Lo Life group in 1988. Lo Lifes were able to adopt Ralph's iconic clothing and designs, but only after over 2 decades of commercial success. Rack Lo himself has sold Ralph's designs as a part of his jewelry line.

== Influence ==
The role of Ralph Lauren in contemporary hip hop fashion is attributed to the Lo Lifes. In 1994, inspired by Lo Life culture, Raekwon wore a Ralph Lauren windbreaker with the words "SNOW BEACH" on the front in the Wu Tang Clan video for "Can It All Be So Simple". The windbreaker became an iconic part of hip hop culture; notably, Chris Brown wore a version in tribute on The Today Show in 2012.

Writing for The New York Times, critic Jon Caramanica credited Lo Lifes with cementing the broader relationship between hip hop and fashion, saying "[t]oday, the genre’s stars collaborate with high-fashion houses or create their own clothing lines. None of that would have been possible without the Lo Life blueprint".

== In media ==
Because many original Lo Lifes were rappers, aspects of the subculture were reflected in their music. For example, Thirstin Howl the 3rd's 1999 album Skillionaire included a track titled "Bury Me With the Lo On". In 2012, Lo Life and rapper Solace and his group Timeless Truth released a video for their song "Wherever We Go" featuring members of the international Lo Life community.

In 2016, Jackson Blount released a book titled Lo Life: An American Classic featuring archival photos. Also that year, photographer Tom Gould and Thirstin Howl the 3rd released Bury Me With the Lo On, a coffee table book documenting multiple generations of Lo Life culture. Vintage photos were sourced from the Thirstin Howl archive and photos from the present day were taken by Gould over the course of three years. A companion documentary was released through Dazed Digital in 2017.

In July 2020, Kevin Garnett's Content Cartel announced a partnership with Village Roadshow Television, Happy Madison Productions and Blowback Productions to develop a scripted series based on the Lo Lifes entitled Lo Lifes: Stealing The American Dream.

The Lo Lifes were featured in the Vice 2021 documentary series Black Market with Michael K. Williams.

== See also ==
- Dallas Penn
