= Company Flow =

American hip hop group

- Company Flow in 1997. (left to right) El-P, Bigg Jus and Mr. Len

Background information
- Origin: Brooklyn, New York City, U.S.
- Genres: Underground hip hop; alternative hip hop
- Years active: 1992–2001; 2007; 2011; 2012
- Label: Rawkus
- Past members: El-P; Bigg Jus; Mr. Len

Company Flow was an American hip hop trio from Brooklyn, New York City, consisting of Bigg Jus, El-P and Mr. Len.

The group was at one time associated with the independent record label Rawkus Records. Rapper/producer El-P and DJ/producer Mr. Len founded the group in 1992 in Queens, New York where rapper/producer Bigg Jus later joined.

== History ==
Founding members El-P and Mr. Len met when the latter was hired to perform as a DJ at the former's 18th birthday party. The two quickly became friends and formed Company Flow in 1993. They released their first single, "Juvenile Techniques" later the same year. After El-P was introduced to Bigg Jus by underground rapper and indie label owner ANTTEX, the trio then released their debut EP, Funcrusher, on their own label Official Recordings in 1995. A follow-up single, "8 Steps to Perfection" was put out in 1996. Subject to a major label bidding war on Libra Records, Company Flow waited until they could get a contract on their own terms. They eventually signed to Rawkus, and helped revitalize underground rap with labelmates like Mos Def. Their full-length debut album Funcrusher Plus was released in 1997 on Rawkus. After two years of pushing the album and touring, group member Bigg Jus decided to strike out on his own and the group amicably dissolved. El-P and Mr. Len followed up their debut with the instrumental album Little Johnny from the Hospitul: Breaks & Instrumentals Vol.1 (Rawkus).

By 2000, the relationship with Rawkus had disintegrated. The label was accused of neglecting the group's talent and being financially dishonest. The staff was fired shortly before Christmas, and Company Flow announced their departure from Rawkus shortly thereafter. Separately, El-P and Mr. Len ended their own deals with Rawkus, effectively severing the relationship between the three and Rawkus. El-P then established Definitive Jux afterward. In late 2000, the group released the single "DPA (As Seen On TV)," which featured three new songs from the group: the title track, "Simian D," and "Simple". It also featured the debut of Cannibal Ox with the songs "Iron Galaxy" "Straight Off the D.I.C." In the single's liner notes, a new Company Flow album was announced. It was titled "Paincave" and was set to release in 2001. However, when the Def Jux Presents compilation released in March 2001, Paincave was then marketed as an El-P solo album in the liner notes. Company Flow would then dissolve later that month after reuniting with Bigg Jus to perform a farewell show at the Bowery Ballroom, and Paincave was scrapped, with some tracks being used on El-P's first solo album Fantastic Damage. El-P continued work with his own record label (Definitive Jux) and pursued a solo career before eventually forming Run the Jewels with Killer Mike. Mr. Len has done the same with his (Dummy Smacks Records). Bigg Jus has released work on Big Dada and Mush Records.

Bigg Jus stated in 2006 that he was working on material for a new Company Flow album, suggesting the possibility of the group re-forming. Company Flow reunited for a show on October 19, 2007 in Brooklyn, New York City as well as a show on July 16, 2011, and supported Portishead at the I'll Be Your Mirror festival at Alexandra Palace, London, on July 23, 2011.

Company Flow performed their final show as a group at Coachella in 2012.

== Discography ==
=== Albums and EPs ===
Album information
Funcrusher
- Released: 1995
- Label: Official Recordings
- Singles: "8 Steps to Perfection"/"Vital Nerve"
Funcrusher Plus
- Released: July 22, 1997
- Label: Rawkus Records
- Singles: "8 Steps to Perfection"/"Vital Nerve", "Population Control", "Blind"/"Tragedy of War (In III Parts)"
Little Johnny from the Hospitul: Breaks & Instrumentals Vol.1
- Released: June 15, 1999
- Label: Rawkus Records
- Singles:

=== Singles ===
- "Juvenile Technique" (1993)
- "8 Steps to Perfection" (1996)
- "Infokill" (1996)
- "Blind" (1997)
- "End to End Burners...Episode 1" (1998)
- "End to End Burners...Episode 2" (1998)
- "D.P.A. (As Seen on TV)" (2000)

=== Guest appearances ===
- "Lune TNS" | Soundbombing (1997)
- Boulevard Connection - "Jonny Rookie Card" | Sut Min Pik (1998)
- Indelible MCs - "Weight" | Lyricist Lounge, Volume One (1998)
- 7 Notas 7 Colores - "NYC-BCN" | 77 (1999)
- "Patriotism" | Soundbombing 2 (1999)
- Mike Ladd - "Bladerunners" | Welcome to the Afterfuture (1999)
- The Infesticons - "Night Time Theme" | Gun Hill Road (2000)
- DPA (As Seen on T.V.); Simian D AKA Feeling Ignorant; Simple | Def Jux Presents (2001)
- DJ Krush - "Vision of Art" | Zen (2001)
- "Low Key" | Tags of the Times 3 (2001)
