= Rawkus Records =

American record label

- Founded: 1995
- Founder: Brian Brater; Jarret Myer
- Status: Inactive
- Distributors: Priority Records (1999–2002); MCA Records (2002–2003); Geffen Records (2004); RED Distribution (2006–2007)
- Genre: Hip-hop
- Country of origin: U.S.
- Location: New York City

Rawkus Records (or Rawkus Entertainment) is an American hip-hop record label, owned by James Murdoch, known for starting the careers of many rappers. Rawkus started in 1995 with releases in hip-hop, drum and bass and fun-dustrial (Dystopia One).

Label heads Brian Brater and Jarret Myer then signed some of the top underground talent from the New York area, notably Mos Def, Talib Kweli, Hi-Tek and Company Flow, who went on to define the label's sound. The string of 12" releases and full-length albums that followed helped initiate a resurgence in the New York/East Coast sound. Many of these are considered classics among hip-hop aficionados. During the mid to late 1990s, Rawkus became a dominant label in the underground hip-hop scene, producing a string of gold albums.

== History ==
Rawkus Records was established in 1995 by Brian Brater and Jarret Myer, with financial backing from their high school friend James Murdoch, son of Rupert Murdoch. In 1996, Rupert Murdoch bought a majority of Rawkus. In 1999 the label entered into a distribution deal with Priority Records.

Over the years, Rawkus recorded several notable independent hip-hop artists, including Reflection Eternal, Company Flow, the High and Mighty, Mos Def and Talib Kweli (as Blackstar), Eminem, Common, Pharoahe Monch and Skillz.

In 2000, Rawkus released New York City rapper Big L's second and final studio album, The Big Picture. Released posthumously after Big L's 1999 murder, the album debuted and peaked in the top 15 on the Billboard 200. Anchored by the success of the single, Flamboyant, the album was certified Gold by the RIAA for selling over 500,000 copies in America.

In 2002, Rawkus signed a joint venture deal with MCA. Soon after, MCA folded and Interscope/Geffen bought Rawkus. After the sale of its catalog in 2004, Rawkus split from Geffen.

In 2006, Rawkus signed with RED (a Sony Music distribution company) and reemerged with a new lineup of notable independent hip-hop artists: The Procussions, Mr. J. Medeiros, Kidz in the Hall, Marco Polo, and Panacea.

In early 2007, Rawkus Records accepted album submissions from hip-hop artists, known or unknown, to be considered for their new campaign. The 50 artists chosen to wear the Rawkus 50 badge were signed to a digital distribution deal through IODA's (Independent Online Distribution Alliance) digital distribution network and had their albums released under the banner "Rawkus 50 presents". Since 2007, Rawkus has not released a new project.

== Discography ==
- 1997: Company Flow - Funcrusher Plus
- 1997: Soundbombing
- 1998: Lyricist Lounge, Volume One
- 1998: Black Star - Mos Def & Talib Kweli Are Black Star
- 1999: Company Flow - Little Johnny from the Hospitul: Breaks & Instrumentals Vol.1
- 1999: High & Mighty - Home Field Advantage
- 1999: Mos Def - Black on Both Sides
- 1999: Pharoahe Monch - Internal Affairs
- 1999: DJ Spinna - Heavy Beats Volume 1
- 1999: Soundbombing II
- 2000: Lyricist Lounge 2
- 2000: Hip Hop for Respect
- 2000: Ego Trip's The Big Playback - The Soundtrack to Ego Trip's Book of Rap Lists
- 2000: Big L - The Big Picture
- 2000: Talib Kweli & Hi-Tek - Train of Thought
- 2001: Smut Peddlers - Porn Again
- 2001: Hi-Tek - Hi-Teknology
- 2001: Da Beatminerz - Brace 4 Impak
- 2001: Various Artists - Scratch Vol 1
- 2002: Mad Skillz - I Ain't Mad No More (unreleased)
- 2002: Talib Kweli - Quality
- 2002: Kool G Rap - The Giancana Story
- 2002: Soundbombing III
- 2004: Talib Kweli - The Beautiful Struggle
- 2005: Best of Decade I: 1995-2005
- 2006: The Procussions - 5 Sparrows for 2 Cents
- 2006: Kidz in the Hall - School Was My Hustle
- 2006: Panacea - Ink Is My Drink
- 2007: Mr. J. Medeiros - Of gods and girls
- 2007: Blue Scholars - Bayani
- 2007: Marco Polo - Port Authority
- 2007: Panacea - The Scenic Route
- 2007: Sev Statik and DJ Dust - Back to Dust
- 2007: Point Blank - Don't Get Carried Away
- 2007: Hezekiah - I Predict A Riot

== Rawkus 50 ==
The "Rawkus 50" marketing campaign saw the release of fifty digital hip-hop albums. They were all made available on 27 November 2007.

1. 12Bit - "Rawkus 50 Presents..."
2. 3rd Brillyance - "Grass Roots"
3. Aarophat - "Aarodynamix"
4. Attlas - "Rawkus 50 Presents..."
5. Bekay - "The Horror Flick"
6. Barak Yalad - "A Loss For Words"
7. Chuck Taylor - "Black Hop"
8. Clan Destined - "And For Our Next Trick"
9. Custom Made - "Truth Be Told"
10. Cymarshall Law - "Hip Hop in the Flesh"
11. Cy Young - "Exactly"
12. Doujah Raze - "Where You Are"
13. Dutchmassive - "Crush Your System"
14. Dynas - "Me, Myself and Rhymes"
15. East - "The Right Direction"
16. Finale - "Develop"
17. Grand Agent - "Peak Oil"
18. Hassaan Mackey - "Soul For Sale"
19. Intricate Minds - "Self Hypnosis"
20. Kaimbr - "Why Be Somebody Else"
21. Kaze - "Block 2 the Basement"
22. Kojoe - "Rawnin'"
23. Krukid - "African"
24. Laws - "Super Thug Killa Rap"
25. LEGACY - "Rawkus 50 Presents..."
26. Mookie Jones - "Catch Me If You Can"
27. Mr. Metaphor - "The Evolution of Marc Bars"
28. Phenetiks - "Revolutionary Non Pollutionary"
29. Pizon - "I Am Hip Hop"
30. Prime - "From the Ground Up"
31. Protoman - "Grey Area"
32. Red Clay - "The Red Dawn"
33. Roddy Rod - "Blunt Park Sessions"
34. Scanz - "Prelude to a Legacy"
35. Scavone - "The Rehab Record"
36. Sev Statik & Dust - "Back to Dust"
37. Silent Knight - "Hunger Strike 2"
38. Brooklyn Shanti - "The1Shanti"
39. 6th Sense - "It's Coming Soon"
40. The Smile Rays - "Smilin' on You"
41. Span Phly - "Two Weeks Notice"
42. Spit Supreme - "Whole Life For This"
43. Spokinn Movement - "60 Min. Spin Cycle"
44. SunN.Y. - "Rawkus 50 Presents..."
45. The Breax - "Rawkus 50 Presents..."
46. The Foundation - "Forever Behind the Music"
47. The Regiment - "The Come Up"
48. Together Brothers - "Rawkus 50 Presents..."
49. Wildabeast - "Many Levels"
50. Willie Evans Jr. - "Communication"
