= Pharoahe Monch discography =

- Studio albums: 4
- Singles: 11
- Mixtapes: 2

The discography of Pharoahe Monch, an American hip hop artist, consists of four studio albums, eleven singles and two mixtapes.

== Albums ==
=== Studio albums ===
List of studio albums, with selected chart positions and certifications
| Title | Album details | Peak chart positions | | |
| Title | Album details | US | US R&B | US Rap |
|---|---|---|---|---|
| Internal Affairs | Released: October 19, 1999 (US); Label: Rawkus/Priority/EMI Records; Formats: CD, digital download | 41 | 6 | — |
| Desire | Released: June 26, 2007 (US); Label: SRC/Universal Motown; Formats: CD, digital download | 58 | 13 | 5 |
| W.A.R. (We Are Renegades) | Released: March 22, 2011 (US); Label: W.A.R. Media/Duck Down Records; Formats: CD, digital download | 54 | 14 | 7 |
| PTSD: Post Traumatic Stress Disorder | Released: April 15, 2014 (US); Label: W.A.R. Media/INgrooves; Formats: CD, digital download | 102 | 19 | 11 |

=== Collaborations ===
| Title | Album details | Peak chart positions | | |
| Title | Album details | US | US R&B | US Rap |
|---|---|---|---|---|
| Organized Konfusion (with Prince Po as Organized Konfusion) | Released: October 29, 1991 (US); Label: Hollywood/Elektra Records; Formats: CD, digital download | — | — | — |
| Stress: The Extinction Agenda (with Prince Po as Organized Konfusion) | Released: August 16, 1994 (US); Label: Hollywood/Elektra Records; Formats: CD, digital download | 187 | 28 | — |
| The Equinox (with Prince Po as Organized Konfusion) | Released: September 16, 1997 (US); Label: Priority/EMI Records; Formats: CD, digital download | 141 | 29 | — |
| A Magnificent Day for an Exorcism (with th1rt3en) | Released: January 22, 2021 (US); Label: Fat Beats Records; Formats: CD, digital download | — | — | — |
"—" denotes a recording that did not chart or was not released in that territory.

=== Mixtapes ===
| Title | Album details | Peak chart positions | | |
| Title | Album details | US | US R&B | US Rap |
|---|---|---|---|---|
| The Awakening | Released: December 19, 2006 (US); Label: Street Records Corporation; Formats: CD, digital download | — | — | — |
| Lost In Translation | Released: February 14, 2015 (US); Formats: CD, digital download | — | — | — |
"—" denotes a recording that did not chart or was not released in that territory.

== Singles ==
=== As lead artist ===
| Title | Year | Peak chart positions | | | Album |
| Title | Year | US | US R&B | US Rap | Album |
|---|---|---|---|---|---|
| Simon Says | 1999 | 97 | 29 | 3 | Internal Affairs |
| The Light | 2000 | — | — | — | Internal Affairs |
| Oh No (with Mos Def & Nate Dogg) | 2000 | 83 | 22 | 1 | Lyricist Lounge 2 |
| The Life (with Styles P) | 2002 | | | | Soundbombing III / A Gangster and a Gentleman |
| Push | 2006 | — | — | — | Desire |
| Desire | 2007 | — | — | — | Desire |
| Body Baby | 2007 | — | — | — | Desire |
| Shine | 2010 | — | — | — | W.A.R. (We Are Renegades) |
| Clap (One Day) | 2011 | — | — | — | W.A.R. (We Are Renegades) |
| Black Hand Side | 2011 | — | — | — | W.A.R. (We Are Renegades) |
| Assassins | 2011 | — | — | — | W.A.R. (We Are Renegades) |
| Damage | 2012 | — | — | — | PTSD: Post Traumatic Stress Disorder |
| Bad M.F. | 2014 | — | — | — | PTSD: Post Traumatic Stress Disorder |
| 24 Hours | 2018 | — | — | — | single |
| Yayo | 2019 | | | | single |
"—" denotes a recording that did not chart or was not released in that territory.

== Guest appearances ==
List of non-single guest appearances as a solo rapper collaborating with other performing artists, showing year released and album name. Does not include guest appearances as one half of the duo Organized Konfusion.
| Title | Year | Other artist(s) | Album |
|---|---|---|---|
| Live from the D.J. Stretch Armstrong Show with Your Friendly Host Bobbito | 1998 | Black Thought, Absolute, Common | Lyricist Lounge, Volume One |
| Take Me Home | 1999 | Polyrhythm Addicts | Rhyme Related |
| Innovations | 1999 | Saukrates | The Underground Tapes |
| The Anthem | 1999 | Sway & King Tech, RZA, Tech N9ne, Eminem, Xzibit, Kool G Rap, Jayo Felony, Chino XL, KRS-One | This or That |
| Dirty Decibels | 1999 | The High & Mighty | Home Field Advantage |
| Turntablist Anthem | 1999 | Rob Swift | The Ablist |
| WWIII | 1999 | Shabaam Sahdeeq | Soundbombing II |
| Mayor | 1999 | —N/a | Soundbombing II |
| Livin It Up | 1999 | —N/a | Next Friday (soundtrack) |
| What Am I? | 2000 | Anti Pop Consortium | - |
| One Four Love (Part 1) | 2000 | Various | Hip Hop for Sprect |
| Lyrical Fluctuation | 2000 | Jigmastas, Shabaam, Mr. Complex, Talib Kweli | Grassroots: the Prologue |
| Horsemen Interlude | 2000 | Canibus | 2000 B.C. (Before Can-I-Bus) |
| Tight Remix | 2000 | Rah Digga, Lord Have Mercy | - |
| Connect | 2000 | DJ Hurricane, Xzibit, Big Gipp | Don't Sleep |
| Kenny Rogers - Pharoahe Monch Dub Plate | 2000 | Wyclef Jean, Kenny Rogers | The Ecleftic: 2 Sides II a Book |
| I Pledge Allegiance | 2001 | Nate Dogg | Music and Me |
| Fuck You | 2001 | —N/a | Training Day: The Soundtrack |
| What Is the Law? | 2001 | —N/a | Oz: soundtrack |
| Last Dayz | 2001 | Adam F | Kaos: The Anti-Acoustic Warfare |
| ESPN Theme The Life | 2001 | Tribeca | —N/a |
| The X (Y'all Know the Name) | 2002 | The X-Ecutioners, Xzibit, Inspectah Deck, Skillz | Built from Scratch |
| Murda 1 Case | 2002 | DJ Quik, KK | Under tha Influence |
| H! Vltg3 | 2002 | Linkin Park, Evidence, DJ Babu | Reanimation |
| Guerrilla Monsoon Rap | 2002 | Black Thought, Talib Kweli | Quality |
| It Ain't the Money | 2003 | Macy Gray | The Trouble with Being Myself |
| Oblivion | 2003 | Aimee Allen | I'd Start a Revolution If I Could Get Up in the Morning |
| Just Do It | 2004 | Pete Rock | Soul Survivor II |
| New World Symphony | 2005 | Miri Ben-Ari | The Hip-Hop Violinist |
| Evaridae | 2005 | O.C. | Starchild |
| Love | 2006 | J Dilla | The Shining |
| Loose Ends | 2006 | Sérgio Mendes, Justin Timberlake, will.i.am | Timeless |
| Rehab (Remix) | 2006 | Amy Winehouse | - |
| Fish Fillet | 2007 | Sa-Ra | The Hollywood Recordings |
| The Matrix | 2008 | Black Milk, Sean Price | Tronic |
| Apocalypse (Remix) | 2008 | Immortal Technique, Akir | The 3rd World |
| Hurt U | 2008 | Jake One | White Van Music |
| One Shot | 2009 | KRS-One, Buckshot | Survival Skills |
| Salute | 2009 | Slaughterhouse | Slaughterhouse |
| Classic Example | 2009 | Hilltop Hoods | State of the Art |
| Dollaz & Sense | 2009 | The Black Keys, RZA | BlakRoc |
| Let U Live | 2010 | Consequence | Movies on Demand |
| Children | 2011 | Styles P | Master of Ceremonies |
| We Go Off | 2011 | Phonte | Charity Starts at Home |
| Epic Dreamers Remix | 2012 | Rizzle Kicks, Hines, Professor Green, Ed Sheeran, Foreign Beggars, Chali 2na | - |
| This Is Our Thing | 2012 | Sadat X | Love Hell or Right |
| BBQ Sauce | 2012 | Sean Price | Mic Tyson |
| Black Out | 2012 | Ghostface Killah, M.O.P. | The Man with the Iron Fists: Original Motion Picture Soundtrack |
| Rap Life | 2014 | Diamond D | The Diam Piece |
| The Cycle | 2014 | Eric Roberson | The Box |
| Calls (Mr. Porter Remix) | 2014 | Robert Glasper, Mr Porter | Porter Chops Glasper |
| Intimidation (So Fine) | 2014 | Brandon Williams, deNaun | XII |
| Down Like This | 2014 | Statik Selektah, Sheek Louch, Crooked I | What Goes Around |
| H20 | 2014 | Apollo Brown and Ras Kass | Blasphemy |
| Emergency Procedure | 2014 | Ghostface Killah | 36 Seasons |
| Cooking | 2015 | Mr. Porter, Royce da 5'9" | - |
| Invisible | 2015 | Black Violoin | Stereotypes |
| What's Love | 2016 | Torae | Entitled |
| Night Rider | 2016 | O.C. | DITC Studios |
| Who Shot Ya (Remix) | 2016 | Living Colour, Black Thought, Chuck D | - |
| Swarm | 2016 | A-F-R-O, Marco Polo | A-F-R-O Polo |
| Pearl Harbor (Remix) | 2018 | Wu-Tang Clan | - |
| I Keep On | 2018 | Apathy, Pete Rock | The Widow's Son |
| The Fight Song | 2018 | Masta Ace and Marco Polo | A Breukelen Story |
| Crazy | 2018 | - | Jamla Is the Squad II |
| Situated | 2019 | Brother Ali | Secrets & Escapes |
| Monte Carlo | 2019 | Brady Watt, Caye | - |
| Drone Warfare | 2019 | DJ Shadow, Nas | Our Pathetic Age |
| OMG | 2019 | Diamond D | The Diam Piece 2 |
| Metal Thangz (Remixed) | 2019 | O.C., Street Smartz | (unreleased, recorded 96) |
| Masterpiece Remix | 2019 | Mickey Factz | The Achievement Deluxe |
| Remove 45 | 2020 | De La Soul, Chuck D, Styles P, Talib Kweli, Mysonne | - |
| The Complex | 2020 | Reks | T.H.I.N.G.S. |
| Be Afraid | 2020 | Ill Bill, Conway the Machine | LA BELLA MEDUSA |
| Worldwide Street Legends | 2021 | Large Pro & Neek the Exotic | Xtraexotic |
| Slam Dunk Contest | 2021 | YOD & TGF | Tha YOD Fahim |
| Get with This One | 2021 | Eric Bobo & Stu Bangas, B-Real | Empires |
| Negro Spiritual | 2021 | Khyrsis, Busta Rhymes | The Hour of Khyrsis |
| Malediction | 2022 | Apathy | King of Gods |
| We Outside | 2023 | 38 Spesh & Conway the Machine | Speshal Machinery |
| Go Time | 2023 | AZ | Truth BE Told |
| My Year | 2024 | Da Beatminerz, De La Soul | Stifled Creativity |
| Medina | 2025 | Smif-n-Wessun | Infinity |

=== Music Videos ===
| Year | Song | Album |
|---|---|---|
| 1999 | The Anthem (Sway & Tech featuring RZA, Tech N9ne, Eminem, Xzibit, Pharoahe, Kool G Rap, Chino XL, KRS-One) | This or That |
| 1999 | Simon Says | Internal Affairs |
| 1999 | The Light | Internal Affairs |
| 1999 | Innovations (Saukrates featuring Pharoahe) | The Underground Tapes |
| 2000 | One Four Love Pt. 1 (with Various) | Hip Hop for Respect |
| 2000 | Oh No (with Nate Dogg & Mos Def) | Lyricist Lounge Vol. 2 |
| 2000 | Connect (DJ Hurricane featuring Xzibit, Big Gipp & Pharoahe) | Don't Sleep |
| 2001 | Fuck You | Training Day soundtrack |
| 2002 | The Life (with Styles P) | Soundbombing III |
| 2007 | Push | Desire |
| 2007 | Let's Go | Desire |
| 2007 | Desire | Desire |
| 2008 | Body Baby | Desire |
| 2008 | When the Gun Draws | Desire |
| 2011 | Clap | W.A.R. |
| 2011 | Black Hand Side | W.A.R. |
| 2012 | Still Standing | W.A.R. |
| 2014 | Broken | P.T.S.D. |
| 2018 | 24 Hours | Non-album single |
