= Rockwilder production discography =

This is the production discography of hip-hop producer Rockwilder. Credits are courtesy of Tidal, Spotify, Apple Music, Discogs, and AllMusic.

== 1994 ==
=== Flatlinerz - U.S.A. {co-produced by Tempest} ===
- 04. "Flatline"
- 05. "Sonic Boom"
- 06. "Brooklyn/Queens"
- 07. "718"
- 10. "Whydyadoit"
- 11. "Takin' Em Underground"
- 12. "Graveyard Nightmare"
- 14. "Rivaz of Red"

=== Quo - Quo ===
- 02. "Huh What" {co-produced by Redman}

=== Organized Konfusion - Stress: The Extinction Agenda ===
- 13. "Maintain"

=== Artifacts - Between a Rock and a Hard Place ===
- 09. "Cummin' Thru Ya Fuckin' Block" (feat. Redman) {co-produced by Redman}

=== Redman - Dare Iz a Darkside ===
- 02. "Bobyahed2dis" (co-produced by Redman)
- 06. "Noorotic" (co-produced by Redman)

=== Shazzy - Pass Anotha Bag single ===
- B1. "Pump My Brother (Ruff Stuff)"

== 1995 ==
=== Erick Sermon - Double or Nothing ===
- 07. "Boy Meets World" (co-produced by Erick Sermon)
- 08. "Welcome" (feat. Keith Murray) (co-produced by Erick Sermon)

=== Jamal - Last Chance, No Breaks ===
- 03. "Situation" (co-produced by Erick Sermon)
- 05. "Fades Em All" (co-produced by Redman)
- 10. "Genetic for Terror" (feat. Keith Murray & L.O.D.) (co-produced by Redman)

=== Shortie No Mass - Like This single ===
- A1. Like This

== 1996 ==
=== Jodeci - Get on Up single ===
- 03. Get on Up (Def Squad Remix) {co-produced by Erick Sermon}

=== Various Artists - Insomnia ===
- 05. Jamal & Calif - Beez Like That (Sometimes) {co-produced by Erick Sermon}

=== Redman - Muddy Waters ===
- 05. "Case Closed" (feat. Napalm & Rockwilder)
- 19. "What U Lookin' 4" (co-produced by Redman)

== 1997 ==
=== EPMD - Back in Business ===
- 03. The Joint {co-produced by Erick Sermon}

=== Busta Rhymes - When Disaster Strikes... ===
- 15. "One" (feat. Erykah Badu)

=== Organized Konfusion - The Equinox ===
- 18. "Somehow, Someway"

=== Derelict Camp - Move It in, Move It Out single ===
- A1. Move It In, Move It Out

== 1998 ==
=== All City - Metropolis Gold ===
- 02. "Stay Awake"
- 11. "Get Paid"
- 16. "Move on You (Remix)"

=== Rough House Survivors - You Got It single ===
- A1. You Got It

=== Big Punisher - Capital Punishment ===
- 03. "Super Lyrical" (feat. Black Thought)
- 20. "You Came Up" (feat. N.O.R.E.)

=== Jay-Z - Vol. 2... Hard Knock Life ===
- 11. "Reservoir Dogs" (feat. The Lox, Sauce Money & Beanie Sigel) {co-produced by Erick Sermon}

=== Busta Rhymes - Extinction Level Event: The Final World Front ===
- 08. "Do It to Death"
- B1. "Do It Like Never Before"

=== Redman - Doc's da Name 2000 ===
- 03. "I'll Bee Dat!"

=== Flipmode Squad - The Imperial ===
- 14. "Hit Em wit da Heat"

== 1999 ==
=== Jay-Z - Vol. 3... Life and Times of S. Carter ===
- 03. "Do It Again (Put Ya Hands Up)" [feat. Amil & Beanie Sigel]
- 14. "NYMP"

=== Method Man & Redman - Blackout! ===
- 07. "Da Rockwilder"

=== Black Moon - War Zone ===
- 18. "Throw Your Hands in the Air" {co-produced by Da Beatminerz}

=== Brixx - Everything Happens for a Reason ===
- 02. "Rockin' and Wildin'"

=== Funkmaster Flex & Big Kap - The Tunnel ===
- 04. "If I Get Locked Up Tonight" --- Dr. Dre & Eminem
- 06. "True" --- Method Man
- 12. "For My Thugs" --- Jay-Z, Memphis Bleek, Beanie Sigel

=== Tash - Rap Life ===
- 13. "Fallin' On"
- 14. "Tash Rules"

=== Humanreck - Deadly and Dangerous ===
- 07. "Straight Like That"
- 09. "Abuse Crews"

=== Various Artists - The PJs (soundtrack) ===
- 07. "Giant Size" --- Raekwon & American Cream Team

== 2000 ==
=== Amil - All Money Is Legal ===
- 04. "Y'all Dead Wrong"
- 07. "Girlfriend"

=== Beenie Man - Love Me Now single ===
- B1. "Love Me Now (Rockwilder Remix)"

=== Beanie Sigel - The Truth ===
- 08. "Stop, Chill"

=== Busta Rhymes - Anarchy ===
- 18. "Make Noise" (feat. Lenny Kravitz)

=== D.I.T.C. - D.I.T.C. ===
- 13. "Thick (Rockwilder Mix)"

=== De La Soul - Art Official Intelligence: Mosaic Thump ===
- 06. "I.C. Y'All" (feat. Busta Rhymes)

=== The Dwellas - The Last Shall Be First ===
- 13. "Ill Collabo" (feat. Organized Konfusion)

=== Jay-Z - The Dynasty: Roc La Familia ===
- 09. "Guilty Until Proven Innocent" (feat. R. Kelly)

=== Lil' Kim - The Notorious K.I.M. ===
- 08. "Notorious K.I.M." (feat. Biggie)

=== LL Cool J - G.O.A.T. ===
- 02. "Imagine That" (feat. LeShaun)

=== Various Artists - WWF Aggression ===
- 03. "Know Your Role" --- Method Man

=== Various Artists - Lyricist Lounge 2 ===
- 02. "Oh No" --- Mos Def, Pharoahe Monch and Nate Dogg

=== Prodigy - H.N.I.C. ===
- 16. "Do It" (feat. Mike Delorean)
- 20. "Gun Play" (feat. Big Noyd)

=== QSR - Washed Out single ===
- A1. "Washed Out

=== Rah Digga - Dirty Harriet ===
- 10. "Break Fool"

=== Xzibit - Restless ===
- 02. "Front 2 Back" (feat. Nate Dogg)

== 2001 ==
=== Angie Martinez - Up Close and Personal ===
- 15. "Mi Amor" (feat. Jay-Z)

=== Bell Biv DeVoe - BBD ===
- 02. "Da Hot Shit"

=== DJ Clue - The Professional 2 ===
- 07. "Getting It" --- Busta Rhymes & Rah Digga

=== Erick Sermon - Music ===
- 02. "It's Nuttin'" (feat. Khari & Daytona)

=== Fabolous - Ghetto Fabolous ===
- 04. "Get Right"

=== Fat Joe - Jealous Ones Still Envy (J.O.S.E.) ===
- 15. "Murder Rap" (feat. Armageddon)

=== Ice Cube - Greatest Hits ===
- 17. "$100 Dollar Bill Y'all"

=== Janet Jackson - All for You ===
- 02. "You Ain't Right"
- 05. "Come On Get Up"
- 09. "Would You Mind"
- 11. "Trust a Try"
- 17. "Feels So Right"
- 18. "Doesn't Really Matter" (Incorporates part of Rockwilder Remix)
- 21. "Who"

==== Janet Jackson - Doesn't Really Matter (Remixes) ====
- "Doesn't Really Matter" (Rockwilder Mix/Dance All Day Extended Mix)

==== Janet Jackson - All for You (Remixes) ====
- "All for You" (Rockwilder Main Mix)

==== Janet Jackson - Son of a Gun (Remixes) ====
- "Son of a Gun (I Betcha Think this Song is About You) [feat. Missy Elliott] {Rock Remix}

=== Left Eye - Supernova ===
- 02. "Hot!" {co-produced by DJ Twinz}

=== Mary J. Blige - No More Drama ===
- 07. "Keep It Moving"

=== Mystikal - Tarantula ===
- 06. "Ooooh Yeah"
- 10. "I Get It Started" (feat. Method Man & Redman) {co-produced by DJ Twinz}

=== Outsidaz - The Bricks ===
- 02. "Keep On"

=== Ras Kass - Van Gogh ===
- 10. "NBA"

=== Redman - Malpractice ===
- 04. "Let's Get Dirty (I Can't Get in da Club)" [feat. DJ Kool]
- 15. "What I'ma Do Now"

=== Sticky Fingaz - Black Trash: The Autobiography of Kirk Jones ===
- 06. "Money Talks" (feat. Raekwon)
- 12. "Cheatin'"

=== Tha Alkaholiks - X.O. Experience ===
- 03. "Run Wild" (feat. Shae Fiol)
- 11. "Sickness" (feat. Butch Cassidy)

=== Various Artists - How High (soundtrack) ===
- 04. "Cisco Kid" --- Method Man, Redman, Cypress Hill & WAR

=== Various Artists - Legally Blonde (soundtrack) ===
- 11. "Sex Machine" --- Mya

=== Various Artists - Moulin Rouge! Music from Baz Luhrmann's Film ===
- 01. "Lady Marmalade" --- Christina Aguilera, Lil Kim, Mya & P!nk {co-produced by Missy Elliott}

=== Various Artists - Rush Hour 2 (soundtrack) ===
- 06. "He's Back" --- Keith Murray

=== Various Artists - Training Day (soundtrack) ===
- 09. "Crooked Cop" --- Roscoe

== 2002 ==
=== Christina Aguilera - Stripped ===
- 16. "Dirrty" (feat. Redman)

=== Destiny's Child - This Is the Remix ===
- 03. "Bootylicious (Rockwilder Remix)" {co-produced by Beyonce & Missy Elliott}

=== Solange Knowles - Solo Star ===
- 09. "Wonderland" {co-produced by Linda Perry}

=== Xzibit - Man vs. Machine ===
- 01. "Release Date"
- 19. “(Hit U) Where It Hurts”

=== Meshell Ndegeocello - Cookie: The Anthropological Mixtape ===
- 16. "Pocketbook (Rockwilder/Missy Elliott Remix)" [feat. Redman]

=== Kool G Rap - The Giancana Story ===
- 07. "Blaze wit Y'all"

=== Styles P - A Gangster and a Gentleman ===
- 06. "Daddy Get That Cash" (feat. Lil Mo) {co-produced by DJ Twinz}

=== Various Artists - Soundbombing III ===
- 03. "Freak Daddy" --- Mos Def

=== Nas - The Lost Tapes ===
- 07. "Everybody's Crazy"

== 2003 ==
=== 50 Cent - Get Rich or Die Tryin' ===
- 12. "Like My Style" (feat. Tony Yayo)

=== DJ Envy - The Desert Storm Mixtape: Blok Party, Vol. 1 ===
- 10. "Throw Your Shit Up" --- Busta Rhymes & Rah Digga

=== Craig G - This Is Now!!! ===
- 06. "Stomped"

=== Various Artists - Honey (soundtrack) ===
- 05. "Leave Her Alone" --- Nate Dogg, Young Chris, Freeway & Memphis Bleek

=== DMX - Grand Champ ===
- 14. "Rob All Night (If I'm Gonna Rob)"

=== Mýa - Moodring ===
- 3. "Why You Gotta Look So Good?" (feat. Lloyd Banks) {co-produced by Mya}

=== Kelis - Tasty ===
- 05. "In Public" (feat. Nas)

=== Beyonce - Crazy in Love single ===
- 04. "Krazy in Love" (Rockwilder Remix) [feat. Jay-Z]

=== Brian McKnight - U-Turn ===
- 11. "U-Turn" (feat. Fabolous & Sir John)

=== Nate Dogg - Nate Dogg ===
- 02. "Bad Girls"
- 04. "Keep It Real"
- 07. "Round and Round"
- 12. "I Got Game"

== 2004 ==
=== Various Artists - Scooby-Doo 2: Monsters Unleashed (soundtrack) ===
- 07. "Shining Star" (Ruben Studdard) {co-produced by She'kspere}

=== Cassidy - Split Personality ===
- 14. "I'm Hungry"

=== Janet Jackson - Damita Jo ===
- 15. "Warmth"

=== Destiny's Child - Destiny Fulfilled ===
- 08. "If"
- 09. "Free"

=== Drag-On - Hell and Back ===
- 09. "Let's Get Crazy" (feat. DMX)

=== Xzibit - Hey Now (Mean Muggin) single ===
- 03. "What U Can't See"

=== Method Man - Tical 0: The Prequel ===
- 14. "Act Right"

== 2005 ==
=== Funkmaster Flex - Car Show Tour ===
- 16. "6 Minutes" [O-Solo]

=== Bossman - Hand Clap single ===
- A1. "Hand Clap"

=== Sheek Louch - After Taxes ===
- 04. "Pain" (feat. Jadakiss)
- 06. "One Name" (feat. Carl Thomas)

=== Streetlife - Street Education ===
- 04. "Street Education"

=== Yummy Bingham - Is It Good to You single ===
- A1. "Is It Good to You" +/- (Remix) [feat. Fabolous & Red Cafe]

== 2006 ==
=== Prince Po - Prettyblack ===
- 08. "Breaknight"

=== Ray Cash - Cash on Delivery ===
- 11. "Livin' My Life"
- 13. "The Bomb"

== 2007 ==
=== Beanie Sigel - The Solution ===
- 06. "Shake It for Me" (feat. Diddy, Ghostface Killah & Peedi Peedi)

=== Lil Wayne - The Drought Is Over 2 (The Carter 3 Sessions) ===
- 11. "Zoo (feat. Mack Maine)"

=== Redman - Red Gone Wild: Thee Album ===
- 07. "How U Like Dat" (feat. Gov Matic)
- 16. "Hold Dis Blaow!"
- 18. "Merry Jane" (feat. Nate & Snoop Dogg)

== 2008 ==
=== Kelly Rowland - Ms. Kelly ===
- 06. "Every Thought Is You"

== 2009 ==
=== 50 Cent - Before I Self Destruct ===
- 14. "Do You Think About Me" (feat. Governor)

=== Method Man & Redman - Blackout! 2 ===
- 06. "Hey Zulu"
- 17. "A Lil Bit" (feat. Melanie Rutherford) {co-produced by Chris N Teeb}

== 2010 ==
=== Redman - Reggie ===
- 08. "Mic, Lights, Camera, Action"

== 2011 ==
=== Musiq Soulchild - MusiqInTheMagiq ===
- 03. "Sayido"

== 2013 ==
=== The Capitol D, Level, & Desert Eagle - Bullfight Records: More Than A Mixtape ===
- "Wild"

== 2015 ==
=== Tyrese - Black Rose ===
- 03 "Picture Perfect" {produced with Eric Hudson}

== 2016 ==
=== Snoop Dogg - Coolaid ===
- "Feel About Snoop"

== 2017 ==
=== Busta Rhymes - TBA ===
- "Girlfriend"

== 2020 ==
=== Busta Rhymes - Extinction Level Event 2: The Wrath of God ===
- "Czar"
- "Satanic"

== 2023 ==
=== Da YoungFellaz & Rockwilder - Call The Dogs - EP ===
- "SYRUP (1964)"
- "Feel the Way I Do"
- "Deja Vu"
- "Tear It Up"
- "See Us Together"
- "ATM"
