= PTSD (Pharoahe Monch album) =

PTSD: Post Traumatic Stress Disorder

Studio album by Pharoahe Monch
- Released: April 15, 2014
- Recorded: 2012–2014
- Genre: Hip hop
- Length: 44:45
- Label: W.A.R. Media; INgrooves
- Producer: Pharoahe Monch; Lee Stone; Marco Polo; The Stepkids; B.A.M.; The Lion Share; Boogie Blind; Jesse West; Quelle Chris

Pharoahe Monch chronology
W.A.R. (We Are Renegades) (2011)	PTSD: Post Traumatic Stress Disorder (2014)

Singles from PTSD: Post Traumatic Stress Disorder
- 1. "Damage" Released: September 27, 2012; 2. "Bad M.F." Released: January 29, 2014

PTSD: Post Traumatic Stress Disorder is the fourth studio album by American hip hop artist Pharoahe Monch, released on April 15, 2014 under his independent label, W.A.R. Media, in partnership with INgrooves. The album features guest appearances from Black Thought, Talib Kweli, Denaun, The Stepkids and Vernon Reid, as well as production from Lee Stone, Marco Polo, Jesse West and Quelle Chris amongst others. The album was promoted by two Lee Stone-produced singles: "Damage" and "Bad M.F.".

== Background ==
In PTSD: Post Traumatic Stress Disorder, Pharoahe Monch continues the story he began telling in his previous LP, W.A.R. (We Are Renegades) (2011) — his third studio album and first independent release. The Queens emcee narrates, in both literal and metaphoric ways, about the trials and tribulations of an independent artist who is at war with the music industry and the struggle of the black male experience in America. In 2012, during an interview with Shawn Setaro, host of the podcast The Cipher, the rapper explained the connections between the two projects, beyond their titles. "The W.A.R. album was like, I'm going to battle against the machine, I'm doing this independently. I'm putting some things out that I learned and I'm going to expose about the music industry. PTSD is the result of me doing that, where I am emotionally now. It's similar to how someone comes back, from war and is stricken by re-adjusting to a regular situation."

Monch told MTV Hive that PTSD is "more mental, emotional and personal" because it came out of the depths of a period of depression. He also gave the internal and external factors that helped him create the album. "I was working on the title track, which took me to a point in between Internal Affairs and Desire, where I was heavily depressed. Through the waiting period, the industry period, and going through a lot emotionally. Then there was the physical [problem] with the asthma. It was the worst. So I started off with that title track and my manager was like, 'Yo, let's really dive into that state and how you got to where you are now, and how this follows what people go through to get back to a so-called 'normal' situation'."

The concept album follows a veteran through combat experience, his return home, relationship dissolution, drug addiction, painful depression, and, finally, a triumphant but realistically rendered decision to keep living and struggling.

Some of the lyrics to "The Jungle" date to at least 2001, when Monch performed the first verse of the song live on Tim Westwood's BBC Radio 1 show.

== Singles and promotion ==
On September 27, 2012, the lead single entitled "Damage", produced by Lee Stone, was released. It represents the final chapter of his anti-gun violence trilogy of songs he has written from a bullet's perspective, starting with "Stray Bullet," which appeared on Organized Konfusion's 1994 album, Stress: The Extinction Agenda, which was followed by "When the Gun Draws" from his second solo album, Desire (2007).

Originally intended to be an EP, PTSD was later changed to a full-length studio album. It was reported that Pharoahe Monch would be doing an Album Release Tour for PTSD in April 2013 with dates in Australia, and New Zealand.

The album was intended to be released in Fall 2012, but no official release date was given until January 2014. In an interview for Crazy Al Cayne TV, at the A3C HipHop Festival in November 2013, Pharoahe said that he was putting the finishing touches on his new album and had the intention to release it in January 2014. On January 29, 2014, it was reported that the project was set to be released on April 15, 2014. On that same date, Pharoahe released the album's second single entitled "Bad MF", which is produced by Lee Stone. On March 18, 2014, the rapper unveiled the cover art for his forthcoming album. He also released a trailer in support of his project, which includes footage from his recent United Kingdom tour.

== Critical reception ==
Professional ratings
Aggregate scores
Source	Rating
Metacritic	78/100
Review scores
Source	Rating
AllMusic	4/5 stars
Exclaim!	8/10
HipHopDX	4/5 stars
Pitchfork Media	6.6/10
PopMatters	6/10
RapReviews	9/10
XXL	(XL)

PTSD was met with critical acclaim. At Metacritic, which assigns a normalized rating out of 100 to reviews from critics, the album received an average score of 78, based on 9 critics, indicating "generally favorable reviews". In a positive review, Del F. Cowie of Exclaim! wrote "Monch's cavernous vocabulary, internal rhymes, precise delivery and thought-provoking metaphors; they remain undiminished 20 years after Organized Konfusion's landmark Stress: The Extinction Agenda." Roman Cooper of HipHopDX wrote "Much like with W.A.R. and Desire, P.T.S.D. seeks to accomplish more than just keep Pharoahe's spot on the criminally-underrated lists warm; instead, it makes a case for placing him among the Chuck Ds and Ice Cubes as one of Hip Hop's sharpest social voices." XXL reviewer Barry Ward noted "Rhyming at a skillful pace with lyrics that get straight to the point has never been an issue for Monch, and he shows no signs of rust on the album." Kyle Kramer of Pitchfork Media wrote "for the most part, Pharoahe [is] creating some of the more emotionally incisive and grounded music of his career." Zach 'Goose' Gase, writing for RapReviews, observed that "Pharoahe Monch has always been among the most talented rappers in the game, and now with 'PTSD,' he has an album that showcases not only his lyrical prowess, but also his ability to craft a fully focused and theme driven album." In a mixed review, Nathan Stevens of PopMatters wrote "The album's structure collapses under its own weight thanks to questionable production and a plot that never becomes cohesive. Still, Monch's bars are among the best in the game. Put his words over shoestring production and your jaw would still drop."

== Track listing ==
No.	Title	Writer(s)	Producer(s)	Length
1.	"The Recollection Facility"		Pharoahe Monch	0:27
2.	"Time²"	M. Bruno; T. Jamerson	Marco Polo	3:14
3.	"Losing My Mind" (featuring Denaun)	T. Jamerson	Jesse West	3:17
4.	"Heroin Addict"	T. Jamerson; L. Stone	Pharoahe Monch	1:05
5.	"Damage"	T. Jamerson; L. Stone	Lee Stone	3:38
6.	"Bad M.F."	T. Jamerson; L. Stone	Lee Stone	3:07
7.	"The Recollection Facility Pt. 2"		Pharoahe Monch	0:21
8.	"Rapid Eye Movement" (featuring Black Thought)	M. Bruno; T. Jamerson; T. Trotter	Marco Polo	4:22
9.	"Scream"	Q. Chris; T. Jamerson	Quelle Chris	2:28
10.	"SideFX" (featuring Dr. Pete)		Pharoahe Monch	0:59
11.	"The Jungle"	M. Bruno; T. Jamerson	Marco Polo	4:13
12.	"Broken Again"	N. Banns; T. Jamerson; J. Singer; C. Soper	The Lion Share Music Group	4:17
13.	"Post Traumatic Stress Disorder"	T. Jamerson	DJ Boogie Blind; B.A.M.	3:43
14.	"D.R.E.A.M." (featuring Talib Kweli)	T. Green; T. Jamerson; L. Stone	Lee Stone	4:24
15.	"The Recollection Facility Pt. 3"		Pharoahe Monch	0:28
16.	"Eht Dnarg Noisulli" (featuring The Stepkids)	T. Ibrahim; T. Jamerson	The Stepkids; Pharoahe Monch	4:42
Total length:				44:45

Digital bonus track
No.	Title	Writer(s)	Producer(s)	Length
17.	"Stand Your Ground" (featuring Vernon Reid)	T. Jamerson; L. Stone	Lee Stone	2:50
Total length:				47:35

Notes

- "Damage" borrows, in the hook, a line from "Mama Said Knock You Out" as performed by LL Cool J.

== Personnel ==
Credits for PTSD: Post Traumatic Stress Disorder adapted from AllMusic.

- B.A.M. – producer
- Nick Banns – engineer, mixing, producer, string arrangements, strings
- Boogie Blind – producer
- Cullen Brooks – vocal engineer
- Marco "Marco Polo" Bruno – mixing, producer
- Brian Cid – engineer, mixing engineer
- Michael Ciro – drums, engineer, guitar
- Alby Cohen – engineer
- Denaun – featured artist
- Dr. Pete – featured artist
- Dan Edinberg – engineer, mixing, primary artist, producer
- Ashley Grier – vocals
- Tsidi Ibrahim – composer
- Troy "Pharoahe Monch" Jamerson – executive producer, primary artist, producer
- Jeff Gitelman – engineer, mixing, primary artist, producer
- King of Chill – engineer
- Ola Kudu – artwork, cover design
- Dave Kutch – mastering
- Talib "Talib Kweli" Greene – featured artist
- Alex Merzin – editing, mixing
- Joe Nardone – mixing
- Quelle Chris – producer
- Guy Routte – executive producer
- Clara Inés Schuhmacher – vocals
- Jesse Singer – engineer, mixing, producer
- Chris Soper – engineer, mixing, producer
- The Stepkids – featured artist
- Lee Stone – mixing, producer
- Tariq "Black Thought" Trotter – featured artist
- Tim Walsh – engineer, mixing, primary artist, producer
- Jesse West – producer
- Christopher Willcocks – cover photo

== Charts ==
Chart (2014)	Peak position
US Billboard 200	102
US Top R&B/Hip-Hop Albums (Billboard)	19
