= Rape (song) =

Song by Pharoahe Monch

from the album Internal Affairs
- Released: October 19, 1999
- Recorded: 1999
- Genre: East Coast hip hop
- Length: 2:37
- Label: Rawkus Records
- Songwriter(s): Pharoahe Monch
- Producer(s): Pharoahe Monch

"Rape" is the fourth track on Internal Affairs, the debut album of Queens rapper Pharoahe Monch. Allmusic critic Steve Huey says in his review "Monch lives up to his reputation as one of hip-hop's most technically skilled MCs. Nowhere is this balancing act more evident than on "Rape," a rather disquieting extended metaphor for his mastery of hip-hop (other MCs just "ain't fuckin' it right")."

Primarily, the song is a satirical response to rapper Common's classic "I Used to Love H.E.R.," a nostalgic song that features a feminized personification of hip-hop as a lost love that has fallen to vice. Pharoahe Monch's more graphic and violent rendition is accordingly a critique of the vapid state of contemporary mainstream hip-hop, conveyed from the perspective of a variously passionate or obsessed rapist, equally infatuated by hip-hop as a woman. As Huey points out, "Rape" equally is an extended metaphor for Pharoahe's technical mastery of hip-hop.

I'm obsessed with multiple nude photographs of the beat in my room on the wall

Pondering the verses, fondling my balls
Witness a nigga who will take rap and chase it
Through unoccupied dimly lit staircases and rape it
Grab the drums by the waistline
I snatch the kick, kick the snares and sodomize the bassline

— Pharoahe Monch, "Rape"

Personification and extended metaphor are techniques widely employed by hip-hop lyricists. In fact this very song is developed from a theme that is found in a Pharoahe Monch verse five years earlier. "Thirteen", a song from the 1994 Organized Konfusion album Stress: The Extinction Agenda, contains the following excerpt from Pharoahe's verse:

Pharoahe, I'm no slave to a rhythm I whip it

Then I take its name and change its religion
Then I chop the foot off the fuckin beat
For trying to escape the track, now its obsolete
That's just the state of mind that I'm in when i...

— Pharoahe Monch, "Thirteen"
