= Damage (Pharoahe Monch song) =

Single by Pharoahe Monch

from the album P.T.S.D. (Post Traumatic Stress Disorder)
- Released: September 27, 2012
- Recorded: 2012
- Genre: Hip Hop
- Length: 3:59
- Label: W.A.R. Media; Duck Down Music Inc.
- Songwriter: Troy Jamerson
- Producer: Lee Stone

Pharoahe Monch singles chronology
"Assassins" (2011)	"Damage" (2012)	"Bad M.F." (2014)

Audio sample
- "Damage" was written by Pharoahe Monch from a bullet's perspective. In this 30 second sample, the rapper mentions gun slain victims. Towards the end, he makes a reference to the first two parts of his "bullet" trilogy.: file; help

"Damage" is a song by American hip hop artist Pharoahe Monch, released as the lead single from his fourth studio album, P.T.S.D. (Post Traumatic Stress Disorder). Prior to its release date, Pharoahe Monch's independent label, W.A.R. Media, published a visual trailer to YouTube on September 22, 2012. The song was officially made available for purchase worldwide on September 27, 2012, on the iTunes Music Store by W.A.R. Media in conjunction with Duck Down Music Inc. The Lee Stone-produced song is the final piece to Pharoahe's "bullet" trilogy in which he anthropomorphizes a slug fired with the intent to annihilate, and tackles the issue of gun violence. The song and its cover art provide a chilling reminder that bullets have no name.

== Background and concept ==
I don't [want to] approach the song as rhyming for the sake of riddling, but that's when I heard the chorus with a whole new meaning, coming from the perspective of a bullet like, “Listen to the way I slay your crew.” As a bullet, it doesn't [care] if you're white, black, Latino, pregnant mother, Pop, politician or whatever. I figured this was the best way to finish the trilogy.

— Pharoahe Monch, MTV Hive

The hook of the song ("Oooh, listen to the way I slaaay your crew...") is from fellow Queens rapper, LL Cool J. It's borrowed from his 1991 hit "Mama Said Knock You Out". During an interview with MTV Hive, Pharoahe expressed that he loved that record and that it contains so many quotations. For three years, he'd write lines for "Damage" and waited until he gets the right instrumental to use them.

Produced and mixed by longtime collaborator Lee Stone, it represents the final chapter of his anti-gun violence trilogy of songs he has written from the point of view of a bullet. The series started with "Stray Bullet", which appeared on Organized Konfusion's 1994 album, Stress: The Extinction Agenda. Then came "When the Gun Draws" from his second solo album, Desire (2007). In "Damage", Pharoahe Monch addresses the tragedy of inner-city killings and mass murder, and mentions well-known gun slain victims — 17-year-old Trayvon Martin, 22-year-old Oscar Grant, 7-year-old Aiyana Jones, and 23-year-old Sean Bell.

The bullet, in this chapter, is portrayed as psychotic and merrily lethal, something that gave the rapper pause for thought when the real-life shooting incident in Aurora, Colorado which occurred at The Dark Knight Rises theater made his song have a little more resonance than he intended. "The song was [penned] way before that incident, which kind of threw me for a loop," Pharoahe Monch told Rap Genius. "I like to embody different characters. And this dude, like I said in the verse, 'I'm sorta certified, fortified live.' It's not a dude actually, it's the bullet that's going crazy in this incident, just going wild and not caring what's happening. It's like a frenzy at that point. That's what threw me for a loop with the tragic incident that happened with the Dark Knight situation. So I went back and examined that character. I was looking at the dude on TV and realized the mindset I expressed in the song is what you have to be in to be that psychotic."

Pharoahe Monch wrote a treatment for the music video in which he will play the role of the bullet who is targeting the people he has mentioned in the song. No music video for the song was released.

== Track listing ==
Digital single

No.	Title	Writer(s)	Producer(s)	Length
1.	"Damage"	Troy Jamerson	Lee Stone	3:59

== Release information ==
=== Purchasable release ===
Date	Format	Label
September 27, 2012	Digital download	W.A.R. Media, Duck Down Music
