= Rape (disambiguation) =

Rape is a form of sexual assault. Its original meaning was "to take by force".

Rape may also refer to:

== Places ==
- Rape (county subdivision), a geographic unit in Sussex, England, United Kingdom

== Arts, entertainment, and media ==
=== Film and television ===
- Rape (film), a 1971 Norwegian film by Anja Breien
- "Raped" (Quantum Leap), a 1991 television episode

=== Literature ===
- "Rape" (poem), by Adrienne Rich
- "Rape", a poem by Patti Smith in the book Witt
- Rape: The First Sourcebook for Women, a 1971 book by New York Radical Feminists

=== Music ===
- "Rape" (song), by Pharoahe Monch
- "Rape Me", a 1993 song by Nirvana from the album In Utero
- Raped a.k.a. The Raped, a punk band later better known as Cuddly Toys

== Biology ==
- Rape (/ˌrɑːˈpeɪ/), a culinary name for members of the genus Lophius (monkfish), deriving from Spanish
- Rapé, a group of smokeless tobacco products containing Nicotiana rustica, used in shamanic medicine in South America
- Rapeseed, or rape, a cultivated plant and oil source
