= The Life (Styles P song) =

2002 single by Styles featuring Pharoahe Monch

Single by Styles featuring Pharoahe Monch

from the album A Gangster and a Gentleman and Soundbombing III
- Released: 2002
- Genre: Hip hop
- Length: 3:09
- Label: Rawkus
- Songwriters: David Styles; Troy Jamerson
- Producer: Ayatollah

Styles singles chronology
"Good Times" (2002)	"The Life" (2002)	"Jenny from the Block" (2002)

Pharoahe Monch singles chronology
"Oh No" (2000)	"The Life" (2002)	"Agent Orange" (2003)

Music video
- "The Life" on YouTube

"The Life" (also known as "My Life") is a song by American rapper Styles featuring fellow American rapper Pharoahe Monch. It is the second single from the former's debut studio album A Gangster and a Gentleman (2002) and previously appeared on Rawkus Records' compilation album Soundbombing III (2002). The song was produced by Ayatollah.

"The Life" was interpolated in the song "My Life" (2021) by rappers J. Cole, 21 Savage and Morray.

== Composition ==
M.F. DiBella of AllMusic described the song as a "soulful memoir". The production contains a vocal sample. The chorus is performed by Pharoahe Monch.

== Critical reception ==
The song was well received by music critics. Steve 'Flash' Juon of RapReviews called it a "welcome inclusion" to A Gangster and a Gentleman. Brett Berliner of Stylus Magazine wrote, "Easily the best track overall album, Ayatollah's soulful beat, laced with a mesmerizing vocal sample similar to that on his earlier work, Ms. Fat Booty, brings out the best in Styles, and has the hook of the year. The song is also backed with deep rhymes like 'My life is a blunt to the head, a prayer for the dead / Run around hustlin', scared of the feds / They said death is eternal sleep, but the only thing is you ain't really sure if you prepared for the bed', which is infinitely more than could be expected out of Styles even a year ago." Uproxx ranked it as Styles P's best song.

== Legacy ==
The song was interpolated in the song "My Life" by J. Cole, 21 Savage and Morray, released in May 2021; Morray performed a rendition of the hook in the song. Both Styles P and Pharoahe Monch reacted favorably to it on social media.

== Charts ==
Chart (2002)	Peak position
UK Singles (Official Charts)	50
US Hot R&B/Hip-Hop Songs (Billboard)	66
