= Th1rt3en (band) =

American band

Th1rt3en is an American rap/rock trio consisting of rapper Pharoahe Monch, drummer Daru Jones, and guitarist Marcus Machado. They released their first song, Fight, featuring Cypress Hill as guest artists, in 2020. Their first album, A Magnificent Day For An Exorcism, was released in 2021.
