= Daru Jones =

American Drummer, producer and artist

- Origin: Michigan
- Genres: Hip hop, Rock
- Instrument: Drums

Daru Jones is an American drummer from Michigan. He has played for Jack White and Pete Rock. He is a two time Grammy Award winner.

== Life and career ==
Jones was born in Michigan to two professional musicians and began playing the drums at the age of four. As a child he practiced drums at his local church, where his mom was a janitor.

Jones started out with touring gigs. In 2005, his first break came with Detroit hip-hop group Slum Village. Eventually, he moved to New York, where he began sharing the studio and stage with musicians like Talib Kweli, Pharoahe Monch and Detroit rapper Black Milk. In 2010, at a show in Nashville, on a drum solo on a Black Milk song called "Losing Out" caught the attention of Jack White. A few months later, White was recording a song with RZA from the Wu-Tang Clan and called Jones to play for him. RZA cancelled and could not make it, but White asked Jones to play for him on some solo tracks. Jones ended up playing on 2 albums for White and has been on tour with him.

He also has served as drummer and musical director for producer Pete Rock and his band called Pete Rock and the Soul Brothers. He has also performed and toured with Nas, Talib Kweli, Black Milk, Salaam Remi, Lorenzo Jovanotti, Sturgill Simpson, Kim Burrell, Rance Allen, Esperanza Spalding, Black Violin, Ski Beatz & The Sensei's, Project Logic, and Jon B.

He is a member of Vienna-based hip hop/jazz trio, THE RUFF PACK,, and the rap/rock trio Thi1rt3en, featuring Pharoahe Monch.

Jones has produced and released tracks in collaborations with vocalists and rappers: Rena, Kissey Asplund, AB, Jasiri X, Reggie B, and Eagle Nebula, and others. Jones has produced original and remixed tracks for recording artists: Muhsinah, Jessie Boykins III, iSHE, Kendra Ross, Clipse, and De La Soul.

Jones also runs a record label called RUSIC RECORDS, LLC.

Jones has won two Grammy Awards.
