= Good Times (Styles P song) =

2002 single by Styles

Single by Styles P

from the album A Gangster and a Gentleman and Swizz Beatz Presents G.H.E.T.T.O. Stories
- Released: 2002
- Recorded: 2001
- Studio: Powerhouse Studios
- Genre: East Coast hip hop
- Length: 3:31
- Label: Ruff Ryders; Interscope
- Songwriters: David Styles, Marilyn McCleod, Pamela Joan Sawyer, Robert Hackerson
- Producers: Saint Denson, Swizz Beatz

Styles P singles chronology
"We Gonna Make It" (2001)	"Good Times" (2002)	"The Life" (2002)

Music video
- "Good Times" on YouTube

"Good Times" is a song by American hip-hop recording artist Styles P, of East Coast hip-hop group the LOX. It was released as his solo debut single and served as the lead single from his debut album, A Gangster and a Gentleman (2002). The song, produced by Swizz Beatz and Saint Denson, samples "I Get High (On Your Memory)", as performed by Freda Payne.

The song, which is dedicated to his marijuana use, peaked at number 22 on the US Billboard Hot 100 chart and received massive nationwide airplay in 2002. The song was also featured on the 2002 compilation Swizz Beatz Presents G.H.E.T.T.O. Stories, as well as Music Inspired by Scarface (2003) and on the soundtrack to the 2004 stoner film, Soul Plane.

== Remixes ==
The song was officially remixed twice. The first remix features a guest appearance from American hip hop duo Method Man & Redman; this remix was featured on the Def Jam compilation album Red Star Sounds Volume 2: B-Sides. There is another well-known version of this remix, released on mixtapes and online, that features an additional verse from Style P's then-Ruff Ryders label-mate, Jin. The second remix features Style P's D-Block cohorts Jadakiss and Sheek Louch, along with fellow American rappers Birdman, Drag-On and J-Hood. Both maintain the original production, however both remixes begin with a sample of Rick James' 1978 single "Mary Jane", while an excerpt from the 1995 stoner film Friday plays, as Chris Tucker's character Smokey claims: "Man ain't nothing wrong with smoking weed. Weed is from the Earth. God put this here for me and you...take advantage man."

== Track listing ==
Promo CD Single

1. "Good Times" (Clean) - 3:43
2. "Good Times" (Dirty) - 3:43
3. "Good Times" (Instrumental) - 3:31

12" Vinyl

1. "Good Times" (Clean) - 3:43
2. "Good Times" (Dirty) - 3:43
3. "Good Times" (Instrumental) - 3:31

Promo CD Single - Remix

1. "Good Times" (Remix featuring Redman and Method Man) (Clean) - 3:46
2. "Good Times" (Remix featuring Baby, Drag-On, Jadakiss, Sheek and J-Hood) (Clean) - 4:30

12" Vinyl - Remix

A-Side

1. "Good Times" (Remix featuring Redman and Method Man) (Clean) - 3:46
2. "Good Times" (Remix featuring Redman and Method Man) (Dirty) - 3:46
3. "Good Times" (Remix featuring Redman and Method Man) (Instrumental) - 3:46

B-Side

1. "Good Times" (Remix featuring Baby, Drag-On, Jadakiss, Sheek and J-Hood) (Clean) - 4:30
2. "Good Times" (Remix featuring Baby, Drag-On, Jadakiss, Sheek and J-Hood) (Dirty Street Mix) - 4:30

== Chart ==
=== Weekly charts ===
Chart (2002)	Peak position
US Billboard Hot 100	22
US Hot R&B/Hip-Hop Songs (Billboard)	6
US Hot Rap Songs (Billboard)	8
US Rhythmic Airplay (Billboard)	20

=== Year-end charts ===
Chart (2002)	Position
US Hot R&B/Hip-Hop Songs (Billboard)	42
