= Push (Pharoahe Monch song) =

Single by Pharoahe Monch

from the album Desire
- Released: September 11, 2006
- Recorded: Mirror Image Studios; New York, NY
- Genre: Funk; hip hop
- Length: 2:52
- Label: SRC; Universal Motown
- Songwriter(s): Pharoahe Monch; Joe Zawinul
- Producer(s): Pharoahe Monch

Pharoahe Monch singles chronology
| "Agent Orange" (2003) | "Push" (2006) | "Let's Go" (2006) |

"Push" is the first single from Pharoahe Monch's 2007 album Desire. The single was released September 11, 2006 as a 12" vinyl, but was later released as a CD single and a digital download. Produced by Pharoahe Monch, the song features an upbeat sound and a prominent use of horns played by Tower of Power. It features encouraging raps provided by Pharoahe Monch as well as background vocals sung by MeLa Machinko and Showtyme. The song contains an interpolation from Joe Zawinul's "Country Preacher." Its music video, directed by Paul Minor, features Monch rapping during the New York City blackout of 1977. The song is also featured in the NBA series 2007 video game NBA Street Homecourt.

The song failed to chart, yet it received generally positive critical attention. According to Dave Maher of Pitchfork Media, "the song is an effective throwback to 70s funk". John Murphy of musicOMH.com labels "Push" a "typically articulate and intense number," while hailing its overlooked "dark, dramatic" lyrics. Spin also hails "Push" citing Monch's powerful vocals and lyrics.

== Track listing ==
=== CD single/Digital download ===
1. "Push" (2:54)
2. "Let's Go" (3:08)

=== 12" vinyl ===
==== A-Side ====
1. "Push" (2:54)

==== B-Side ====
1. "Let's Go" (3:08)
2. "Push (Instrumental)" (2:54)
