= W.A.R. (We Are Renegades) =

Studio album by Pharoahe Monch
- Released: March 22, 2011
- Recorded: 2008–2010
- Genre: Hip hop
- Length: 45:03
- Label: W.A.R. Media; Duck Down
- Producer: Pharoahe Monch (exec.); Guy Routte (exec.); Lion's Share Music Group; Exile; Marco Polo; M-Phazes; Mike Loe; Fatin "10" Horton; Diamond D; Samiyam; Adam Deitch & Eric Krasno

Pharoahe Monch chronology
Desire (2007)	W.A.R. (We Are Renegades) (2011)	PTSD: Post Traumatic Stress Disorder (2014)

Singles from W.A.R. (We Are Renegades)
- 1. "Shine" Released: July 27, 2010; 2. "Clap (One Day)" Released: January 18, 2011; 3. "Black Hand Side" Released: March 3, 2011; 4. "Assassins" Released: March 15, 2011

W.A.R. (We Are Renegades) is the third studio album of American hip hop artist Pharoahe Monch released on March 22, 2011, under Duck Down Records. Producers include Lion's Share Music Group, Exile, Marco Polo, M-Phazes, Mike Loe, Fatin "10" Horton, Diamond D, Samiyam, and Fyre Dept.'s Adam Deitch and Eric Krasno, while vocal features are contributed by Idris Elba, Immortal Technique, Vernon Reid of Living Colour, Showtyme, Styles P of The LOX, Phonte (formerly of Little Brother), Mela Machinko, Mr. Porter, Jean Grae, Royce da 5'9", Citizen Cope and Jill Scott. Scratches are provided by DJ Boogie Blind of The X-Ecutioners.

== Background ==
The album's release date was announced during Pharoahe Monch's tour alongside supergroup Slaughterhouse, during early 2010. Featured guests were confirmed in July 2010 along with the track listing of the album. The original release date was October 26, 2010. Since then, track listing and features have been slightly changed.

== Singles ==
Thus far, the album has four singles: the first one, "Shine", a collaboration with Mela Machinko, was released on July 27, 2010. The song was produced by Diamond D.

The second promotional single, "Clap (One Day)", was released on January 18, 2011. Produced by M-Phazes, the song features Showtyme & DJ Boogie Blind, who have collaborated with Pharoahe Monch on various occasions. A ten-minute extended music video was released on March 8, 2011, depicting "a police raid gone dramatically wrong". It was directed by Terence Nance, with a score by Lion's Share Music Group, and appearances from Gbenga Akinnagbe (known for his portrayal of Chris Partlow in HBO's award-winning drama series The Wire), Kim Howard and Josiah Small.

A third promotional single, "Black Hand Side", has been released on March 3, 2011. It was produced by Mike Loe and features Phonte (formerly of Little Brother) and Styles P of The LOX. Pharoahe Monch and Styles P have collaborated before, on Styles P's 2002 Ayatollah produced single "My Life"

On March 15, 2011, the fourth promotional single, "Assassins", was released. Australian producer M-Phazes crafted the beat, while featured guest verses were provided by Jean Grae and Royce da 5'9".

== Reception ==
=== Commercial performance ===
The album debuted at number 54 on the US Billboard 200 chart, with first-week sales of 9,600 copies in the United States. In its second week, it sold 4,600 copies and dropped to number 149 on the Billboard 200.

=== Critical response ===
Professional ratings
Review scores
Source	Rating
Allmusic	4/5 stars
Spin	7/10 stars
HipHopDX	4/5 stars
DJBooth	4/5 stars
RapReviews	8.5/10 stars
HipHopGame	5/5 stars
CMJ	(80/100)
Okayplayer	(92/100)
Clash (magazine)	(7/10)

We Are Renegades received a perfect 5 star rating from HipHopGame.com and an average score of 77 out of 100, on the review site Metacritic, based on 18 reviews, indicating "Generally favorable reviews" Nathan S. of DJBooth.net awarded the album four out of five stars, hailing it as "...nothing but quality."

== Track list ==
The track listing has been confirmed by iTunes US, featurings and producers were confirmed via HipHopDX, and writing credits per Allmusic.

No.	Title	Writer(s)	Producer(s)	Length
1.	"The Warning" (featuring Idris Elba)	Troy Jamerson	Pharoahe Monch	0:52
2.	"Calculated Amalgamation"	Jamerson; Neil Singh	Lion's Share Music Group	2:48
3.	"Evolve"	Aleksander Manfredi; Jamerson	Exile	2:40
4.	"W.A.R." (featuring Immortal Technique and Vernon Reid)	Jamerson; Marco Bruno	Marco Polo	4:25
5.	"Clap (One Day)" (featuring Showtyme and DJ Boogie Blind)	Jamerson; Mark Landon	M-Phazes	3:30
6.	"Black Hand Side" (featuring Styles P and Phonte)	David Styles; Jamerson; Michael Warren	Mike Loe	4:31
7.	"Let My People Go"	Fatin Horton; Jamerson	Fatin "10" Horton	3:55
8.	"Shine" (featuring Mela Machinko)	Jamerson; Joseph Kirkland	Diamond D	4:08
9.	"Haile Selassie Karate" (featuring Mr. Porter)	Larissa Conner; Jamerson; Sam Baker	Samiyam	2:23
10.	"The Hitman"	Jamerson; Landon	M-Phazes	3:25
11.	"Assassins" (featuring Jean Grae and Royce da 5'9')	Jamerson; Landon; Tsidi Ibrahim; Ryan Montgomery	M-Phazes	4:32
12.	"The Grand Illusion (Circa 1973)" (featuring Citizen Cope)	Ibrahim; Jamerson; Adam Deitch; Eric Krasno	Fyre Dept.	5:16
13.	"Still Standing" (featuring Jill Scott)	Conner; Jamerson; Landon	M-Phazes	5:18

iTunes bonus video
No.	Title	Writer(s)	Director(s)	Length
1.	"Clap (One Day)" (Short Film)	Kevin P. Nelson; Terence Nance	Terence Nance	10:15

== Charts ==
Chart (2011)	Peak position
US Billboard 200	55
US Top R&B/Hip-Hop Albums (Billboard)	14
