= A Gangster and a Gentleman =

2002 debut album by Styles P

Studio album by Styles P
- Released: June 25, 2002
- Recorded: 2001–2002
- Genre: Hip-hop
- Length: 1:19:43
- Label: Ruff Ryders; Interscope
- Producer: Alchemist; DJ Clue; DJ Shok; DJ Twinz; Jay "Icepick" Jackson; Ken "Duro" Ifill; Mr. Devine; P. Killer Trackz; Saint Denson; Styles P; Swizz Beatz; Tank; Tuneheadz

Styles P chronology
A Gangster and a Gentleman (2002)	Time Is Money (2006)

Singles from A Gangster and a Gentleman
- 1. "Good Times" Released: August 11, 2002; 2. "The Life" Released: 2002

Professional ratings
Review scores
Source	Rating
AllMusic	3/5 stars
HipHopDX	4/5
RapReviews	6/10
The Source	4/5 stars
Stylus	B
XXL	XL (4/5)

A Gangster and a Gentleman is the debut studio album by American rapper Styles P. The album was released on July 9, 2002, through Ruff Ryders Entertainment and Interscope Records. Styles P was the second member of the Lox trio to record a solo album, after Kiss tha Game Goodbye by Jadakiss, which was released in August 2001.

The album was produced by Swizz Beatz, P. Killer Trackz, DJ Shok, Mr. Devine, Alchemist, DJ Clue, DJ Twinz, Jay "Icepick" Jackson, Ken "Duro" Ifill, Saint Denson, Tank, Tuneheadz, and Styles P himself. It features guest appearances from Jadakiss, Sheek Louch, J-Hood, Angie Stone, Cross, Eve, Garf, Lil' Mo, M.O.P., P. Killer Trackz, Swizz Beatz and Pharoahe Monch.

In the United States, the album peaked at number 6 on the Billboard 200 and number 2 on the Top R&B/Hip-Hop Albums charts. October 11, 2002, the album was certified Gold by Recording Industry Association of America for selling 500,000 copies in the US alone.

== Singles ==
The lead single "Good Times" peaked at number 22 on the US Billboard Hot 100 chart and received massive nationwide airplay in 2002. The Ayatollah-produced bonus track "The Life" featuring Pharoahe Monch was also released as a single in 2002 through Rawkus Records.

== Track listing ==
No.	Title	Writer(s)	Producer(s)	Length
1.	"Intro"	David Styles	Styles P	0:33
2.	"Good Times (I Get High)"	Styles; Robert Hankerson; Kasseem Dean; Marilyn McLeod; Pam Sawyer	Saint Denson; Swizz Beatz	3:31
3.	"Y'all Know We in Here" (featuring Swizz Beatz and P. Killer Trackz)	Styles; Anthony Fields	P. Killer Trackz	3:48
4.	"A Gangster and a Gentleman"	Styles; Daniel Alan Maman	The Alchemist	4:32
5.	"Black Magic" (featuring Angie Stone)	Styles; Maman; A. Smith	The Alchemist	4:28
6.	"Daddy Get That Cash" (featuring Lil' Mo)	Styles; Dana Stinson; Raymond Grant; Richard Grant; Jean Johnson; Doris McNeil	Rockwilder; DJ Twinz	3:40
7.	"Lick Shots" (performed by the L.O.X. and J-Hood)	Styles; Sean Jacobs; Jason Phillips; Joshua Hood; Dean	Swizz Beatz	4:24
8.	"And I Came To..." (featuring Eve and Sheek Louch)	Styles; Eve Jeffers; Jacobs; Dean	Swizz Beatz	4:43
9.	"Get Paid" (featuring the Brodhead Kids)	Styles; Loren Lunnon	Mr. Devine	3:43
10.	"Ass Bag" (Skit)			2:00
11.	"I'm a Ruff Ryder" (featuring Jadakiss)	Styles; Fields	P. Killer Trackz	3:45
12.	"Soul Clap"	Styles; Michael Gomez; Robert Mickens; Claydes Smith; Dennis Thomas; Richard Westfield; Robert Bell; Ronald Bell; George Brown	DJ Shok	3:18
13.	"We Thugs (My Niggas)" (performed by the L.O.X.)	Styles; Ernesto Shaw; Kenneth Ifill; Robert T. Kimball; Steve Lukather	DJ Clue; DURO	4:04
14.	"Styles" (featuring Jadakiss)	Styles; Fields	P. Killer Trackz	3:54
15.	"Barbershop" (Skit)			3:42
16.	"Listen"	Styles; Derryck Thornton; Mabon Hodges; Al Green	Tank	2:58
17.	"Niggas Flippin'" (Skit)			1:12
18.	"Y'all Don't Wanna Fuck" (featuring M.O.P.)	Styles; Jamal Grinnage; Eric Murray; Franklin Crum	Tuneheadz	4:34
19.	"Shit Done Changed (Skit)" (featuring Garf)			2:07
20.	"Nobody Believes Me" (featuring Sheek Louch, Cross and J-Hood)	Styles; Gomez	DJ Shok	3:49
21.	"Dedication" (Skit)			0:42
22.	"My Brother"	Styles; Lunnon; D. Grusin	Mr. Devine	4:34
23.	"Outro"	Styles	Styles P; Jay "Icepick" Jackson	2:33
24.	"The Life" (featuring Pharoahe Monch)	Styles; Troy Jamerson	Ayatollah	3:09
Total length:				1:19:43

Leftover tracks

- "Good Times (Remix)" (featuring Method Man & Redman)
- "Good Times (Street Remix)" (performed by The LOX, J-Hood, Drag-On and Baby)

== Charts ==
=== Weekly charts ===
Chart (2002)	Peak position
US Billboard 200	6
US Top R&B/Hip-Hop Albums (Billboard)	2

=== Year-end charts ===
Chart (2002)	Position
Canadian R&B Albums (Nielsen SoundScan)	108
US Billboard 200	152
US Top R&B/Hip-Hop Albums (Billboard)	43

== Certifications ==
Region	Certification	Certified units/sales
United States (RIAA)	Gold	500,000^{^}
^{^} Shipments figures based on certification alone.
