= Organized Konfusion (album) =

Studio album by Organized Konfusion
- Released: 1991
- Genre: East Coast hip hop
- Length: 56:40
- Label: Hollywood; Elektra
- Producer: Organized Konfusion; Snap & the Foolish Mortals; Kid Nyce & So Unique

Organized Konfusion chronology
Organized Konfusion (1991)	Stress: The Extinction Agenda (1994)

Organized Konfusion is the debut album by Queens hip hop duo Organized Konfusion. The album was released in 1991 under Hollywood Basic. The album and the group have received a large cult following throughout the years. Group members Pharoahe Monch and Prince Po were praised for their highly skilled lyrical ability, making use of intelligent vocabulary and metaphors. The content on the album ranges from light-hearted tales ("Who Stole My Last Piece of Chicken?" "Audience Pleaser"), to extreme, politically influenced songs ("Releasing Hypnotical Gases," "Prisoners of War"), to religious influence ("Open Your Eyes"). "Walk into the Sun" peaked at No. 15 on Billboard's Hot Rap Singles chart.

== Critical reception ==
Professional ratings
Review scores
Source	Rating
AllMusic	5/5 stars
RapReviews	10/10
(The New) Rolling Stone Album Guide	4.5/5 stars
The Source	4/5 stars

The record was given a rating of 4 out of 5 in The Source in January 1992. Trouser Press noted that "Releasing Hypnotical Gases" "worked as an extended scatological joke, a comic-book fanatic's trivia test and one of most complex set of battle rhymes ever written [that] shows how weird, funny and virtuosic Organized Konfusion could be." The effort has received perfect ratings from many sources, including AllMusic and RapReviews. AllMusic's Stanton Swihart wrote:

The inspired debut album from the duo of Prince Poetry and Pharoahe Monch was arguably the best underground rap album of the 1990s...Organized Konfusion may be, alongside Main Source's Breaking Atoms, the quintessential cult hip-hop album from a decade full of forward-looking efforts.

== Track listing ==
- All tracks produced by Organized Konfusion

No.	Title	Writer(s)	Length
1.	"Fudge Funk"		1:04
2.	"Fudge Pudge" (featuring O.C.)	L. Baskerville, T. Jamerson, O. Credle	5:31
3.	"Walk into the Sun"	L. Baskerville, T. Jamerson	5:05
4.	"Releasing Hypnotical Gases"	L. Baskerville, T. Jamerson	5:15
5.	"Audience Pleasers"	L. Baskerville, T. Jamerson	3:33
6.	"Jiminez Criqueta"	L. Baskerville, T. Jamerson	1:25
7.	"Prisoners of War"	L. Baskerville, T. Jamerson	4:36
8.	"The Rough Side of Town"	L. Baskerville, T. Jamerson	4:47
9.	"Organized Konfusion"	L. Baskerville, T. Jamerson	4:48
10.	"P.S. 48"		1:43
11.	"Roosevelt Franklin"	L. Baskerville, T. Jamerson	3:58
12.	"Who Stole My Last Piece of Chicken? (Remix)"	L. Baskerville, T. Jamerson	3:31
13.	"Open Your Eyes"	L. Baskerville, T. Jamerson	4:57
14.	"Intro"	L. Baskerville, T. Jamerson	2:17
15.	"Who Stole My Last Piece of Chicken?"	L. Baskerville, T. Jamerson	4:05
