= List of awards and nominations received by The Wire =

Awards and nominations received by The Wire
Awards and nominations
Award	Wins	Nominations
American Black Film Festival Awards	1	1
American Cinema Editors Awards	1	2
American Film Institute Awards	3	3
Artios Awards	1	1
ASCAP Awards	1	1
Banff Rockie Awards	0	1
British Academy Television Awards	0	1
Crime Thriller Awards	3	4
Directors Guild of America Awards	1	1
Edgar Awards	1	2
GLAAD Media Awards	0	2
Golden Reel Awards	0	1
Humanitas Prizes	0	1
Irish Film and Television Awards	1	1
NAACP Image Awards	0	16
NAMIC Vision Awards	0	5
Peabody Awards	1	1
Primetime Emmy Awards	0	2
Satellite Awards	0	1
Television Critics Association Awards	1	10
Writers Guild of America Awards	1	3

Totals (Note: Certain award groups do not simply award one winner. They acknowledge several different recipients, have runners-up, and have third place. Since this is a specific recognition and is different from losing an award, runner-up mentions are considered wins in this award tally. For simplification and to avoid errors, each award in this list has been presumed to have had a prior nomination.)
- Wins: 16
- Nominations: 60

The Wire is an American crime drama television series created by David Simon and broadcast by the cable network HBO. It premiered on June 2, 2002, and ended on March 9, 2008, comprising sixty episodes over five seasons. Set in Baltimore, Maryland, The Wire follows different institutions within the city, such as the illegal drug trade, the education system, and the media, and their relationships to law enforcement. The series features a diverse ensemble cast of both veteran and novice actors; the large number of black actors was considered groundbreaking for the time.

The Wire has been widely hailed as one of the greatest television series of all time. Despite the critical acclaim, however, the show received relatively few awards during its run. It was nominated for only two Primetime Emmy Awards – both for Outstanding Writing for a Drama Series – and did not win any. Many have called its lack of recognition, especially in the Outstanding Drama Series category, one of the biggest Emmys snubs ever. Some have argued the lack of recognition was due to the show's dense plots and a disconnect between the setting and Los Angeles–based voters.

Outside of the Emmys, The Wire won a Writers Guild of America Award for Television: Dramatic Series in 2008, as well as a Directors Guild of America Award for the episode "Transitions" in 2009. It was thrice named one of the top television programs of the year by the American Film Institute and received a Peabody Award in 2004. The series was nominated for sixteen NAACP Image Awards but never won one. It was also nominated for ten Television Critics Association Awards, with its only win coming in 2008 for the group's Heritage Award.

== Awards and nominations ==
Awards and nominations received by The Wire
Award	Year (Note: The listed year refers to the date of the ceremony, not necessarily the year in which the corresponding season or episode aired.)	Category	Nominee(s)	Result	Ref.
American Black Film Festival Awards	2020	Classic Television Award	The Wire	Won	
American Cinema Editors Awards	2007	Best Edited One-Hour Series for Non-Commercial Television	Kate Sanford (for "Boys of Summer")	Won	
American Cinema Editors Awards	2009	Best Edited One-Hour Series for Non-Commercial Television	Kate Sanford (for "More With Less")	Nominated	
American Film Institute Awards	2003	Television Programs of the Year	The Wire	Won (Note: One of ten official selections)	
American Film Institute Awards	2006	Television Programs of the Year	The Wire	Won	
American Film Institute Awards	2008	Television Programs of the Year	The Wire	Won	
Artios Awards	2003	Outstanding Achievement in Dramatic Pilot Casting	Alexa L. Fogel and Pat Moran (for "The Target")	Won	
ASCAP Awards	2004	Top Television Series	Tom Waits	Won	
Banff Rockie Awards	2007	Best Continuing Series	The Wire (for "Boys of Summer")	Nominated	
British Academy Television Awards	2009	Best International Show	The Wire (Note: Nominees: David Simon, Ed Burns, Nina Kostroff Noble, and Joe Chappelle)	Nominated	
Crime Thriller Awards	2008	International TV Crime Drama	The Wire	Won	
Crime Thriller Awards	2008	Best Actor	Dominic West	Nominated	
Crime Thriller Awards	2009	International TV Dagger	The Wire	Won	
Crime Thriller Awards	2009	Best Actor	Dominic West	Won	
Directors Guild of America Awards	2009	Outstanding Directorial Achievement in Dramatic Series – Night	Dan Attias (for "Transitions") (Note: Additional nominees: Nina Noble (unit production manager); Eric Henriquez (first assistant director); Xanthus Valan (second assistant director); Tim Blockburger (second second assistant director))	Won	
Edgar Awards	2003	Best Television Episode Teleplay	David Simon and Ed Burns (for "The Target")	Nominated	
Edgar Awards	2007	Best Television Feature/Mini-Series Teleplay	The Wire (Note: Nominees: Ed Burns, Kia Corthron, Dennis Lehane, David Mills, Eric Overmyer, George Pelecanos, Richard Price, David Simon, and William F. Zorzi)	Won	
GLAAD Media Awards	2003	Outstanding Drama Series	The Wire	Nominated	
GLAAD Media Awards	2005	Outstanding Drama Series	The Wire	Nominated	
Golden Reel Awards	2007	Best Sound Editing in Television: Short Form – Dialogue and Automated Dialogue Replacement	Will Ralston, (Note: Credited as Jennifer Ralston) Igor Nikolic, and Matthew Haasch (for "Misgivings") (Note: Additional crew: Bruce Litecky (production sound mixer); Fran Boyd (loop group supervisor); Bobby Johnson, Dave Boulton, and Robert Bragg (ADR mixers); Andrew Kris (dialogue re-recording mixer))	Nominated	
Humanitas Prizes	2008	60 Minute Category	George Pelecanos and David Simon (for "Late Editions")	Nominated	
Irish Film and Television Awards	2009	Best Actor in a Lead Role – Television	Aidan Gillen	Won	
NAACP Image Awards	2003	Outstanding Drama Series	The Wire	Nominated	
NAACP Image Awards	2004	Outstanding Drama Series	The Wire	Nominated	
NAACP Image Awards	2004	Outstanding Actor in a Drama Series	Wendell Pierce	Nominated	
NAACP Image Awards	2005	Outstanding Drama Series	The Wire	Nominated	
NAACP Image Awards	2005	Outstanding Supporting Actor in a Drama Series	Idris Elba	Nominated	
NAACP Image Awards	2005	Outstanding Supporting Actress in a Drama Series	Sonja Sohn	Nominated	
NAACP Image Awards	2007	Outstanding Drama Series	The Wire	Nominated	
NAACP Image Awards	2007	Outstanding Actor in a Drama Series	Michael K. Williams	Nominated	
NAACP Image Awards	2007	Outstanding Supporting Actor in a Drama Series	Wendell Pierce	Nominated	
NAACP Image Awards	2007	Outstanding Supporting Actor in a Drama Series	Glynn Turman	Nominated	
NAACP Image Awards	2007	Outstanding Directing in a Drama Series	Seith Mann (for "Home Rooms")	Nominated	
NAACP Image Awards	2009	Outstanding Drama Series	The Wire	Nominated	
NAACP Image Awards	2009	Outstanding Supporting Actor in a Drama Series	Wendell Pierce	Nominated	
NAACP Image Awards	2009	Outstanding Supporting Actor in a Drama Series	Michael K. Williams	Nominated	
NAACP Image Awards	2009	Outstanding Supporting Actress in a Drama Series	Sonja Sohn	Nominated	
NAACP Image Awards	2009	Outstanding Directing in a Drama Series	Seith Mann (for "The Dickensian Aspect")	Nominated	
NAMIC Vision Awards	2003	Best Drama	The Wire (for "Cleaning Up")	Nominated	
NAMIC Vision Awards	2003	Best Dramatic Performance	Sonja Sohn (for "The Cost")	Nominated	
NAMIC Vision Awards	2005	Best Drama	The Wire (for "Time After Time")	Nominated	
NAMIC Vision Awards	2005	Best Dramatic Performance	Idris Elba (for "Time After Time")	Nominated	
NAMIC Vision Awards	2007	Best Drama	The Wire (for "Boys of Summer")	Nominated	
Peabody Awards	2004	—	The Wire	Won	
Primetime Emmy Awards	2005	Outstanding Writing for a Drama Series	George Pelecanos and David Simon (for "Middle Ground")	Nominated	
Primetime Emmy Awards	2008	Outstanding Writing for a Drama Series	David Simon and Ed Burns (for "-30-")	Nominated	
Satellite Awards	2006	Best Television Series, Drama	The Wire	Nominated	
Television Critics Association Awards	2003	Program of the Year	The Wire	Nominated	
Television Critics Association Awards	2003	Outstanding Achievement in Drama	The Wire	Nominated	
Television Critics Association Awards	2003	Outstanding New Program of the Year	The Wire	Nominated	
Television Critics Association Awards	2004	Outstanding Achievement in Drama	The Wire	Nominated	
Television Critics Association Awards	2007	Program of the Year	The Wire	Nominated	
Television Critics Association Awards	2007	Outstanding Achievement in Drama	The Wire	Nominated	
Television Critics Association Awards	2008	Program of the Year	The Wire	Nominated	
Television Critics Association Awards	2008	Outstanding Achievement in Drama	The Wire	Nominated	
Television Critics Association Awards	2008	Individual Achievement in Drama	David Simon	Nominated	
Television Critics Association Awards	2008	Heritage Award	The Wire	Won	
Writers Guild of America Awards	2008	Television: Dramatic Series	The Wire (Note: Nominees: Ed Burns, Chris Collins, Dennis Lehane, David Mills, George Pelecanos, Richard Price, David Simon, and William F. Zorzi)	Won	
Writers Guild of America Awards	2008	Television: Episodic Drama	David Simon and Ed Burns (for "Final Grades")	Nominated	
Writers Guild of America Awards	2009	Television: Dramatic Series	The Wire	Nominated	
