= Simon Says (Pharoahe Monch song) =

1999 single by Pharoahe Monch

Single by Pharoahe Monch

from the album Internal Affairs
- Released: 1999
- Genre: Hardcore hip hop
- Length: 2:53
- Label: Rawkus
- Songwriter: Troy Jamerson
- Producers: Lee Stone; Pharoahe Monch

Pharoahe Monch singles chronology
"Simon Says" (1999)	"The Light" (2000)

Music video
- "Simon Says" on YouTube

"Simon Says" is the debut single by American rapper Pharoahe Monch. It was released in 1999, as the lead single from his debut studio album Internal Affairs (1999). "Simon Says" is Monch's most popular song, and it samples the theme song of the 1992 film Godzilla vs. Mothra.

== Background ==
The song was released by Rawkus Records in 1999, and peaked at #97 on the Billboard Hot 100. It was also featured in the 2000 films Charlie's Angels and Boiler Room.

In 2001, Pharoahe Monch was sued by Toho for the song's uncleared use of a sample from Akira Ifukube's Gojira Tai Mosura (the theme to Godzilla vs. Mothra) in the hook. As a result, the distribution of Internal Affairs was halted.

== Remixes ==
An official remix of the song appears on Internal Affairs, and features American rappers Lady Luck, Method Man, Redman, Shabaam Sahdeeq and Busta Rhymes.

== Charts ==
Chart (1999)	Peak position
US Billboard Hot 100	97
US Hot R&B/Hip-Hop Songs (Billboard)	29
US Hot Rap Songs (Billboard)	3
