= Internal Affairs (Pharoahe Monch album) =

Studio album by Pharoahe Monch
- Released: October 19, 1999
- Recorded: 1998−1999
- Genre: Hip hop
- Length: 53:22
- Label: Rawkus; Priority
- Producer: Rene John-Sandy II (exec.); Pharoahe Monch (also exec.); Lee Stone (also exec.); DJ Scratch; The Alchemist; Diamond D

Pharoahe Monch chronology
Internal Affairs (1999)	Desire (2007)

Singles from Internal Affairs
- 1. "Simon Says" Released: August 17, 1999; 2. "Right Here (Remix)" Released: 2000; 3. "The Light" Released: 2000

Professional ratings
Review scores
Source	Rating
AllMusic	4.5/5 stars
RapReviews	9/10
Rolling Stone	4/5 stars
The Source	4/5 stars

Internal Affairs is the solo debut from former Organized Konfusion member Pharoahe Monch, released on October 19, 1999, by Rawkus Records and Priority Records. Monch creates a harder sound than heard on the previous Organized Konfusion records. The album spawned the Hot 100 hit "Simon Says".

The album is out of print because of Pharoahe Monch's refusal to record for the Geffen Records label after Universal Music Group acquired Rawkus Records from Priority. Rawkus, as well as its then-parent label MCA Records, were later folded by the Universal Music Group into Geffen Records.

To commemorate the album's 20th anniversary, it was reissued on October 19, 2019, becoming available digitally and on streaming services for the first time. A limited edition vinyl release was also released on June 5, 2020.

== Track listing ==
No.	Title	Writer(s)	Producer(s)	Length
1.	"Intro"	George Spivey; Troy Jamerson	DJ Scratch	3:04
2.	"Behind Closed Doors"	Jamerson	Pharoahe Monch	3:12
3.	"Queens"	Hod David; Jamerson; Maxwell Rivera	Lee Stone; Pharoahe Monch	3:31
4.	"Rape"	Jamerson	Pharoahe Monch	2:37
5.	"Simon Says"	Jamerson	Lee Stone; Pharoahe Monch	2:55
6.	"Official"	Jamerson; Lee Stone	Lee Stone	3:48
7.	"Hell" (featuring Canibus)	Germaine Williams; Jamerson; Stone	Lee Stone	3:10
8.	"No Mercy" (featuring M.O.P.)	Alan Maman; Eric Murray; Jamal Grinnage; Jamerson	The Alchemist	4:30
9.	"Right Here"	Jamerson; Spivey	DJ Scratch	2:57
10.	"The Next Shit" (featuring Busta Rhymes)	Jamerson; Stone; Trevor Smith, Jr.	Lee Stone; Pharoahe Monch	3:21
11.	"The Ass" (featuring Apani B. Fly)	Apani Smith; Jamerson; Joseph Kirkland	Diamond D	3:28
12.	"The Light"	Kirkland; Jamerson	Diamond D	3:39
13.	"God Send" (performed by Organized Konfusion)	Jamerson; Lawrence Baskerville; Stone	Lee Stone; Pharoahe Monch	3:17
14.	"The Truth" (featuring Common & Talib Kweli)	Kirkland; Jamerson; Lonnie Lynn, Jr.; Talib Greene	Diamond D	3:57
15.	"Simon Says" (Remix) (featuring Lady Luck, Method Man & Redman, Shabaam Sahdeeq & Busta Rhymes)	Clifford Smith; Jamerson; Marcus Vialva; Reginald Noble; Shanel Jones; Smith	Lee Stone; Pharoahe Monch	6:16

Sample credits

- "Intro" contains samples of "Blues and The Abstract Truth" by Oliver Nelson.
- "Behind Closed Doors" contains samples of "Aftermath" by Quincy Jones.
- "Queens" contains samples of "Til the Cops Come Knockin" by Maxwell.
- "Rape" contains samples of "Candy Man" by Quincy Jones.
- "Simon Says" and "Simon Says (remix)" contains samples of "Godzilla vs. Mothra - Main Title" by Akira Ifukube.
- "No Mercy" contains samples of "The Trap" by Jerry Goldsmith.
- "The Next Shit" contains samples of "Espani Cani" by Sid Bass.
- "The Light" contains samples of "Mi Cosa" by Wes Montgomery, and "Summer Wishes, Winter Dreams" by George Benson.
- "God Send" contains samples of "Iggin Me" by Chico DeBarge, and "Excentrifugal Forz" by Frank Zappa .
- "The Truth" contains samples of "Cristo Redentor" by Harvey Mandel.

=== Music videos ===
- "Simon Says" (1999, director: Busta Rhymes)
- "The Light" (2000, director: Jeff Richter)

== Chart positions ==
=== Album ===
Chart (1999)	Peak position
US Billboard 200	41
US Top R&B/Hip-Hop Albums (Billboard)	6

=== Singles ===
Year	Song	Chart positions		
Year	Song	Billboard Hot 100	Hot R&B/Hip-Hop Singles & Tracks	Hot Rap Singles
1999	"Simon Says"	97	29	3
2000	"The Light"	—	—	30
