= Oh No (Mos Def and Pharoahe Monch song) =

Single by Mos Def and Pharoahe Monch featuring Nate Dogg

Single by Mos Def and Pharoahe Monch featuring Nate Dogg

from the album Lyricist Lounge 2
- B-side: "Get Up"
- Released: November 4, 2000
- Genre: Hip hop
- Length: 3:59
- Label: Rawkus
- Songwriter(s): Dante Smith, Troy Jamerson, Nathaniel Hale, Dana Stinson
- Producer(s): Rockwilder

Mos Def singles chronology
"Blak Iz Blak" (2000)	"Oh No" (2000)	"Ms. Fat Booty 2" (2000)

Pharoahe Monch singles chronology
"Ill Collabo" (2000)	"Oh No" (2000)	"The Life" (2002)

Nate Dogg singles chronology
"Where I Wanna Be" (2000)	"Oh No" (2000)	"Lay Low" (2001)

Music video
- "Oh No" on YouTube

"Oh No" is a song by American rappers Mos Def and Pharoahe Monch featuring American singer Nate Dogg. It was released in November 2000 by Rawkus Records, as a single from the compilation album Lyricist Lounge 2 (2000). The song was produced by Rockwilder.

== Background ==
Pharoahe Monch has stated that he never thought about collaborating with Nate Dogg on the track until Mos Def proposed it in a phone call. After hearing Nate sing in the chorus, Monch praised the idea.

== Track listing ==
Track listing acquired from Discogs:

A1: Oh No (Explicit) (3:59)

A2: Oh No (Instrumental) (3:38)

B1: Get Up (Explicit) (3:53)

-Performed by Cocoa Brovaz

B2: Get Up (Instrumental) (3:53)

== Charts ==
Chart (2000–01)	Peak position
UK Singles (OCC)	24
US Billboard Hot 100	83
US Hot R&B/Hip-Hop Songs (Billboard)	22
US Hot Rap Songs (Billboard)	1
