= Training Day (soundtrack) =

Soundtrack album by various artists
- Released: September 11, 2001
- Recorded: 2001
- Studio: Various: Chung King Studios (New York, NY); Encore Studios (Los Angeles, CA); Record One (Sherman Oaks, CA); Stankonia Recording (Atlanta, GA); Studio 56 (Los Angeles, CA); Village Recorders (Los Angeles, CA); Sony Studios (New York, NY); Mirror Image Studios (New York, NY); Daddy's House Recording Studio (New York, NY); Ameraycan Studios (Los Angeles, CA); Windmark (Virginia Beach, VA); D&D Studios (New York, NY); View Park Sound Lab (View Park, CA)
- Genre: Hip hop
- Length: 1:05:24
- Label: Priority
- Producer: David M. Ehrlich (exec.); Doug Frank (exec.); Gary LeMel (exec.); John Houlihan (exec.); DJ Battlecat; DJ Muggs; DJ Premier; DJ Shok; Donald "XL" Robertson; Dr. Dre; Floss P; Jason "Jay E" Epperson; Mario Winans; Nottz; Pharoahe Monch; P. Diddy; Rockwilder; The Neptunes; Waiel "Wally" Yaghnam

Singles from Training Day
- 1. "#1" Released: August 29, 2001; 2. "Put It On Me" Released: 2001

Professional ratings
Review scores
Source	Rating
AllMusic	3/5 stars
RapReviews	4/10

Training Day: The Soundtrack is the soundtrack album to Antoine Fuqua's 2001 crime film Training Day. It was released on September 11, 2001, through Priority Records and contains mostly hip hop music.

Recording sessions took place at Chung King Studios, at Sony Studios, at Mirror Image Studios, at Daddy's House Recording Studio and at D&D Studios in New York, at Encore Studios, at Record One, at Studio 56, at Village Recorders, at Ameraycan Studios and at View Park Sound Lab in Los Angeles, at Stankonia Recording in Atlanta, and at Windmark Recording in Virginia Beach.

Production was handled by DJ Muggs, DJ Battlecat, DJ Premier, DJ Shok, Donald "XL" Robertson, Dr. Dre, Floss P, Jason "Jay E" Epperson, Mario Winans, Nottz, Pharoahe Monch, Sean "Puffy" Combs, Rockwilder, The Neptunes and Waiel "Wally" Yaghnam, with David M. Ehrlich, Doug Frank, Gary Lemel and John Houlihan serving as executive producers.

It features contributions from Big Azz Ko, Black Rob, C-Murder, Cypress Hill, DJ Quik, Dr. Dre, Gang Starr, Kain, King Jacob, Kokane, Krumbsnatcha, Mark Curry, Mark Mancina, Mimi, M.O.P., Napalm, Nelly, P. Diddy, Pharoahe Monch, Professor, Ras Kass, Roscoe, Saafir, (rapper) |Soldier B], changed his name to (King Joe ), the Clipse, The Lox, Trick Daddy, Xzibit and David Bowie.

The album did fairly well on the Billboard charts, peaking at number 35 on the Billboard 200, number 19 on the Top R&B/Hip-Hop Albums chart and number 3 on the Top Soundtracks chart, and spawning two hit singles, "#1" by Nelly and "Put It on Me" by Dr. Dre, DJ Quik and Mimi. "The Squeeze" was originally released as a 12" single, but was quickly pulled off shelves because of sample clearance issue. The single also has a special back cover, which says in big white letters, "In Stores September 11, 2001".

== Track listing ==
No.	Title	Writer(s)	Producer(s)	Length
1.	"Keep Your Eyes Open" (Film dialogue)	David Ayer		0:06
2.	"W.O.L.V.E.S." (performed by Krumbsnatcha and M.O.P.)	Demetrius Gibbs; Jamal Grinnage; Eric Murray; Dominick Lamb; Wolfgang Käfer	Nottz	3:57
3.	"Bounce, Rock, Golden State" (performed by Ras Kass, Saafir and Xzibit)	John Austin; Reggie Gibson; Alvin Joiner; Kevin Gilliam	DJ Battlecat	4:05
4.	"Put It on Me" (performed by Dr. Dre, DJ Quik and Mimi)	Andre Young; David Blake; Royal Harbor; Scott Storch; Mike Elizondo	Dr. Dre	5:04
5.	"#1" (performed by Nelly)	Cornell Haynes; Waiel Yaghnam	Waiel "Wally" Yaghnam	4:23
6.	"Fuck You" (performed by Pharoahe Monch)	Troy Jamerson	Pharoahe Monch	3:54
7.	"Watch the Police" (performed by C-Murder and Trick Daddy)	Corey Miller; Maurice Young; Donald Robertson; O'Shea Jackson; Lorenzo Patterson; A. Young	Donald "XL" Robertson	2:49
8.	"Dirty Ryders" (performed by The Lox)	David Styles; Jason Phillips; Sean Jacobs; Michael Gomez	DJ Shok	4:20
9.	"Crooked Cop" (performed by Napalm)	A. Stanton; Dana Stinson	Rockwilder	3:57
10.	"American Dream" (performed by P. Diddy, Big Azz Ko, Black Rob, Kain, Mark Curry and David Bowie)	Sean Combs; Tommie Gibson; Robert Ross; Gylan Kain Cioffie; Mark Curry; David Robert Jones; Mario Winans; Lyle Mays; Pat Metheny	Mario Winans; P. Diddy	5:21
11.	"Greed" (performed by Cypress Hill and Kokane)	Louis Freese; Senen Reyes; Jerry B. Long Jr.; Lawrence Muggerud	DJ Muggs	3:42
12.	"Guns N' Roses" (performed by the Clipse)	Gene Thornton; Terrence Thornton; Chad Hugo; Pharrell Williams	The Neptunes	3:38
13.	"Tha Squeeze" (performed by Gang Starr)	Keith Elam; Chris Martin	DJ Premier; GuRu (co.)	3:28
14.	"Let Us Go" (performed by King Jacob and Professor)	Jacob Thomas; Prentiss Church	Jason "Jay E" Epperson; Nelly (exec.)	4:38
15.	"Training Day (In My Hood)" (performed by Roscoe)	David Williams; Muggerud	DJ Muggs	4:21
16.	"Protect Your Head" (performed by Soldier B (Kevin Duane Lewis) Aka King Joe)	Soldier B; Floss P.	Floss P	4:18
17.	"Wolf or Sheep (Film Score)" (performed by Mark Mancina)	Mark Mancina		3:41
Total length:				1:05:24

Notes

- Track 2 features backing vocals from Jason and Jonathan Soto also known as the Soto Twinz

Sample credits

- Track 2 contains elements from "Exaltation" written and performed by Wolfgang Käfer
- Tracks 4 and 17 contains film dialogue from the Warner Bros. motion picture Training Day
- Track 7 contains an interpolation of "Fuck tha Police" written by O'Shea Jackson, Lorenzo Patterson and Andre Young and performed by N.W.A
- Track 10 contains an interpolation of "This Is Not America" written by David R. Jones, Pat Metheny and Lyle Mays and performed by David Bowie

=== Other songs ===
The following songs are featured in the film but are not present on the soundtrack album:

- "Still D.R.E." by Dr. Dre featuring Snoop Dogg
- "(Rock) Superstar" by Cypress Hill
- "Last Resort" by Papa Roach
- "Letter to the President" by 2Pac and the Outlawz
- "Rize" by Outlawz featuring Big Syke

== Personnel ==
- Demetrius "Krumbsnatcha" Gibbs – performer (track 2)
- Jamal "Lil' Fame" Grinnage – performer (track 2)
- Eric "Billy Danze" Murray – performer (track 2)
- Jason Soto – backing vocals (track 2)
- Jonathan Soto – backing vocals (track 2)
- Dominick "Nottz" Lamb – producer (track 2)
- Michael Conrader – recording & mixing (track 2)
- Rock Logic – additional mixing (track 2)
- Halsey Quemere – assistant recording & mixing (track 2)
- Eddy Schreyer – mastering (tracks: 2, 3, 6–8, 10–17)
- Alvin "Xzibit" Joiner – performer (track 3)
- John "Ras Kass" Austin – performer (track 3)
- Reggie "Saafir" Gibson – performer (track 3)
- Kevin "Battlecat" Gilliam – producer & mixing (track 3)
- Michelle Lynn Forbes – recording (track 3)
- Richard "Segal" Huredia – engineering (track 3)
- Andre "Dr. Dre" Young – performer, producer & mixing (track 4)
- David "DJ Quik" Blake – performer (track 4)
- Mimi – performer (track 4)
- Brian Gardner – mastering (track 4)
- Cornell "Nelly" Haynes – performer (track 5), executive producer (track 14)
- Waiel "Wally" Yaghnam – producer (track 5)
- Matt Still – recording (track 5)
- Russell Giraud – recording (track 5)
- Rich Travali – mixing (track 5)
- Peter Vassos – mastering (track 5)
- Troy "Pharoahe Monch" Jamerson – performer & producer (track 6)
- Ben Briggs – recording (track 6)
- Booker T. Jones III – mixing (track 6)
- Jeffrey Phurrough – assistant engineering (track 6)
- Corey "C-Murder" Miller – performer (track 7)
- Maurice "Trick Daddy" Young – performer (track 7)
- Donald "XL" Robertson – producer (track 7)
- Claude Achille – recording & mixing (track 7)
- David "Styles P" Styles – performer (track 8)
- Jason "Jadakiss" Phillips – performer (track 8)
- Sean "Sheek Louch" Jacobs – performer (track 8)
- Michael "DJ Shok" Gomez – producer (track 8)
- Chris Theis – recording & mixing (track 8)
- Steve Conover – recording (track 8)
- A. "Napalm" Stanton – performer (track 9)
- Dana "Rockwilder" Stinson – producer (track 9)
- Tommy Uzzo – recording (track 9)
- Michael Hogan – mixing (track 9)
- Emily Lazar – mastering (track 9)
- Sean Combs – performer & producer (track 10)
- Tommie "Big Azz Ko" Gibson – performer (track 10)
- Robert "Black Rob" Ross – performer (track 10)
- Gylan "Kain" Cioffie – performer (track 10)
- Mark Curry – performer (track 10)
- David Robert "David Bowie" Jones – performer (track 10)
- Mario "Yellow Man" Winans – producer (track 10)
- Jim Janik – recording (track 10)
- Lynn Montrose – assistant recording (track 10)
- Paul Logus – mixing (track 10)
- Louis "B-Real" Freese – performer (track 11)
- Senen "Sen Dog" Reyes – performer (track 11)
- Jerry "Kokane" Long – performer (track 11)
- Lawrence "DJ Muggs" Muggerud – producer (tracks: 11, 15), mixing (track 11)
- Troy Staton – recording & engineering (track 11)
- Gene "Malice" Thornton – performer (track 12)
- Terrence "Pusha T" Thornton – performer (track 12)
- Chad Hugo – producer & recording (track 12)
- Pharrell Williams – producer (track 12)
- Serban Ghenea – mixing (track 12)
- Keith "GuRu" Elam – performer & co-producer (track 13)
- Christopher "DJ Premier" Martin – producer (track 13)
- Eddie Sancho – mixing (track 13)
- Dexter Thibou – assistant engineering (track 13)
- "King Jacob" Thomas – performer (track 14)
- Prentiss "Professor" Church – performer (track 14)
- Jason "Jay E" Epperson – producer (track 14)
- Prince Charles Alexander – mixing (track 14)
- David "Roscoe" Williams – performer (track 15)
- Brandon Abeln – recording & mixing (track 15)
- Soldier B – performer (track 16)
- Floss P – producer (track 16)
- Janine Moret – recording (track 16)
- Steve Harvey – mixing (track 16)
- Mark Mancina – performer & composer (track 17)
- Don L. Harper – conductor (track 17)
- Johnny Whieldon – coordinator (track 17)
- Dave Metzger – orchestra (track 17)
- Adrian Lee – programming (track 17)
- Greg Dennen – recording (track 17)
- Steve Kempster – engineering & mixing (track 17)
- Charles Choi – additional engineering (track 17)
- Brian Dixon – assistant engineering (track 17)
- David M. Ehrlich – executive producer, A&R
- John Houlihan – executive producer, supervision
- Douglas Paul Frank – executive producer
- Gary LeMel – executive producer
- Maggie Schmidt – art direction
- Will Ragland – illustration, design
- Robert Zuckeman – photography
- Ted Reed – coordinator
- Jesse Stone – A&R coordinator
- Mike Baiardi – A&R administrator
- Chuck Wilson – additional A&R
- Sheila Bowers – management

== Charts ==
Chart (2001)	Peak position
Canadian Albums (Billboard)	49
US Billboard 200	35
US Top R&B/Hip-Hop Albums (Billboard)	19
US Soundtrack Albums (Billboard)	3

=== Year-end charts ===
Chart (2002)	Position
Canadian R&B Albums (Nielsen SoundScan)	160
Canadian Rap Albums (Nielsen SoundScan)	81
