= The Equinox (album) =

Studio album by Organized Konfusion
- Released: September 23, 1997
- Recorded: October 1996 – August 1997
- Genre: Hip hop
- Length: 62:27
- Labels: Priority; EMI
- Producers: Organized Konfusion; Rockwilder; Diamond D; Buckwild

Organized Konfusion chronology
Stress: The Extinction Agenda (1994)	The Equinox (1997)

The Equinox is the third and final album by heralded Queens hip hop duo Organized Konfusion. It was released in 1997 on Priority Records.

== Background ==
The group branched out to work with a number of outside producers, including Diamond D, Showbiz, Buckwild and Rockwilder. The effort is a concept album about the lives of two Black teens. Included on the album are two ambitious tracks: "Invetro" and "Hate." The former gives voice to the unborn, with Pharoahe Monch and Prince Po rhyming as unborn twins, one hoping for their mother to get an abortion, the other praying for a chance to live, respectively, while the latter features Monch and Po rhyming as white supremacists. "Invetro" follows in the same steps as "Stray Bullet" from the group's previous album, giving voices to things that can not speak.

== Critical reception ==
Professional ratings
Review scores
Source	Rating
AllMusic	4/5 stars
Chicago Tribune	3/4 stars
The Encyclopedia of Popular Music	3/5 stars
NME	7/10
The New Rolling Stone Album Guide	2.5/5 stars
The Source	3.5/5 stars
Spin	7/10

AllMusic called The Equinox "an album full of stimulating lyrics and well arranged instrumentation." Spin wrote that "the production is rhythmically and melodically expressive." The Chicago Tribune wrote: "Devoid of pop hooks, the album is a gem of underground economy: crisp drum tracks, thunderous bass lines and simple keyboard, horn or guitar loops."

== Track listing ==
#	Title	Songwriters	Producer(s)	Performer (s)
1	"Interior Assassin's Car, 3:35 AM [Skit]"			*Interlude*
2	"They Don't Want It!"	L. Baskerville, T. Jamerson	Organized Konfusion	Prince Po
3	"March 21, 3:45 AM [Skit]"			*Interlude*
4	"9x Out of 10"	L. Baskerville, T. Jamerson	Organized Konfusion	Prince Po, Pharoahe Monch
5	"Questions"	L. Baskerville, T. Jamerson, J. Kirkland	Diamond D	Prince Po, Pharoahe Monch
6	"Soundman"	L. Baskerville, T. Jamerson, J. Watson	Rasheed	Pharoahe Monch, Prince Po
7	"Move"	L. Baskerville, T. Jamerson	Organized Konfusion	Pharoahe Monch, Prince Po
8	"Confrontations"	L. Baskerville, T. Jamerson, R. Lemay	Showbiz	Prince Po, Pharoahe Monch
9	"Life & Malice Exterior, Club, Night [Skit]"			*Interlude*
10	"Numbers"	L. Baskerville, T. Jamerson, T. Hogan	Casper	Prince Po, Pharoahe Monch
11	"Shugah Shorty"	L. Baskerville, T. Jamerson, A. Best, Palmieri, Clash, Palmieri	Buckwild	Prince Po, Pharoahe Monch, Hurricane G
12	"Interior Car, Night [Skit]"			*Interlude*
13	"Invetro"	L. Baskerville, T. Jamerson, A. Best	Buckwild	Prince Po, Pharoahe Monch
14	"Chuck Cheese"	L. Baskerville	Organized Konfusion	Prince Po, Rude One, Tha Ill Rahlos
15	"Interior, Marisol's Apartment [Skit]"			*Interlude*
16	"Sin"	T. Jamerson, T. Hogan	Casper	Pharoahe Monch
17	"Hate"	L. Baskerville, T. Jamerson	Organized Konfusion	Pharoahe Monch, Mike, Prince Po
18	"March 21, 3:47 AM [Skit]"			*Interlude*
19	"Somehow, Someway"	L. Baskerville, T. Jamerson, D. Stinson, A. Young, C. Broadus, Webster, Adams, Arrington, Waddington, Turner, Casey	Rockwilder	Prince Po, Pharoahe Monch
20	"Epilogue"			*Interlude*
21	"United as One"	L. Baskerville, T. Jamerson		Pharoahe Monch, Prince Po, Tha Ill Rahlos

== Charts ==
Chart (1997)	Peak position
US Billboard 200	141
US Top R&B/Hip-Hop Albums (Billboard)	29
