= Desire (Pharoahe Monch album) =

Studio album by Pharoahe Monch
- Released: June 26, 2007
- Recorded: 2006–2007
- Genre: Hip hop
- Length: 51:14
- Labels: SRC; Universal Motown
- Producers: Lee Stone; The Alchemist; Denaun Porter; Black Milk; Sean C & LV (Grind Music); Bo McKensie

Pharoahe Monch chronology
Internal Affairs (1999)	Desire (2007)	W.A.R. (We Are Renegades) (2011)

Singles from Desire
- 1. "Push" Released: September 11, 2006; 2. "Let's Go" Released: September 15, 2006; 3. "Body Baby" Released: June 18, 2007; 4. "Desire" Released: 2007

Desire is the second solo album from hip hop artist Pharoahe Monch, released on June 26, 2007. The album comes eight years after the rapper's critically acclaimed solo debut, Internal Affairs, which followed the break-up of Monch's former group Organized Konfusion. After a short stint on Geffen Records, a number of labels began a bidding war for the rapper, including Eminem's Shady Records, Denaun Porter's Runyon Ave. Records, Bad Boy Records and Sony Records. In early 2006, it was announced that Pharoahe had signed a deal with Steve Rifkind's Street Records Corporation for the release of his second album.

== Release ==
"Push" is the first single taken from Desire. It was released on 11 September 2006, with the B-side single "Let's Go". A music video for "Push" was also released in late September 2006, and has received play on MTV Base. The video is set in the New York City blackout of 1977. A ten-minute internet-only video for the track "When the Gun Draws" was released exclusively to AllHipHop.com on January 3, 2007. Desire features production from Monch, longtime collaborator Lee Stone, The Alchemist, Denaun Porter, Black Milk and Sean C. Album guests include Erykah Badu and Denaun Porter. The single Desire is featured in the video game Madden 08.

The second single, "Let's Go", was released on 15 September and produced by Black Milk. It features singing by MeLa Machinko, a fast-paced guitar-led beat produced by Black Milk, scratches provided by Boogie Blind, and two verses rapped by Pharoahe Monch.

== Reception ==
Professional ratings
Review scores
Source	Rating
About.com	4.5/5 stars
Allmusic	4/5 stars
Entertainment Weekly	A
HipHopDX.com	4.5/5 stars
PopMatters	8/10 stars
RapReviews.com	9/10 stars
Pitchfork Media	(7.9/10)
USA Today	4/4 stars
XXL Magazine	4/5 stars
DJBooth.net	4/5 stars

The album received critical acclaim, just like Internal Affairs. As of July 11, 2007, the album has sold 17,026 copies in the US.

== Track listing ==
No.	Title	Producer(s)	Length
1.	"Intro"	Pharoahe Monch	0:32
2.	"Free"	Bo McKensie	3:34
3.	"Desire" (featuring Showtyme & MeLa Machinko)	The Alchemist	3:32
4.	"Push" (featuring Showtyme, MeLa Machinko & Tower of Power)	Pharoahe Monch	2:52
5.	"Welcome to the Terrordome"	Sean C & LV	3:31
6.	"What It Is"	Pharoahe Monch; Lee Stone	2:56
7.	"When the Gun Draws" (featuring Mr. Porter)	Mr. Porter	3:16
8.	"Let's Go" (featuring MeLa Machinko)	Black Milk	4:16
9.	"Body Baby"	Pharoahe Monch; Mr. Porter	3:18
10.	"Bar Tap" (featuring MeLa Machinko)	Black Milk	3:08
11.	"Hold On" (featuring Erykah Badu)	Lee Stone	3:49
12.	"So Good"	Pharoahe Monch	3:15
13.	"Trilogy; Act I: Cops Coming (featuring Mr. Porter); Act II: Revenge (featuring Dwele); Act III: Evil Eyes (featuring Tone Trezure)"	Mr. Porter	9:22

UK bonus track
No.	Title	Producer(s)	Length
14.	"Agent Orange"	Sa-Ra	3:44

Best Buy bonus track
No.	Title	Length
15.	"Book of Judges"	3:33

Soundtrack version additional track
No.	Title	Producer(s)	Length
16.	"Fuck You"	Pharoahe Monch	4:14

Notes

- On the song "Fuck You" the explicit version is 12 seconds longer than the edited version.

Samples

- "Free" contains elements from the composition "I'm Free" performed by Millie Jackson.
- "Desire" contains elements from the composition "The Picture Never Changes" written by Holland-Dozier-Holland. The track also samples "Ante Up" performed by M.O.P.
- "Push" contains interpolations from the composition "Country Preacher" written by Josef Zawinul.
- "Welcome To The Terrordome" contains elements from the compositions "Welcome to the Terrordome" written by Public Enemy and "Come On and Get It" written by H.D. Rogers.
- "Hold On" contains elements from the composition "I'll Get By Without You" performed by Wah Wah Watson.
- "So Good" contains elements from the composition "My Place" written by Tweet.
- "Bar Tap" contains elements from the composition "Deliver the Word" performed by War (U.S. band).

== Album singles ==
Single information
"Push" (featuring Showtyme, MeLa Machinko, and Tower of Power)
- Released: September 26, 2006
- B-side: "Let's Go" (featuring MeLa Machinko)
"Desire" (featuring Showtyme and MeLa Machinko)
- Released: January, 2007
- B-side: "When The Gun Draws" (featuring Denaun Porter)
"Body Baby"
- Released: May, 2007
- B-side: "Body Baby (Remix)"

== Charts ==
Chart (2007)	Peak position
US Billboard 200	58
US Top R&B/Hip-Hop Albums (Billboard)	13
