= Organized Konfusion =

American hip hop duo

- Prince Po (left) and Pharoahe Monch

Background information
- Also known as: Simply II Positive MCs
- Origin: Queens, New York City, U.S.
- Genres: Alternative hip hop; hardcore hip hop
- Years active: 1987–1997; 2004; 2009–present
- Labels: Hollywood BASIC; Elektra; Priority; EMI
- Members: Prince Po; Pharoahe Monch

Organized Konfusion (OK) is an alternative hip hop duo from Queens, New York, composed of Prince Po and Pharoahe Monch. They have released the albums Organized Konfusion (1991), Stress: The Extinction Agenda (1994), and The Equinox (1997).

== History ==
=== Recording career ===
Group members Prince Po and Pharoahe Monch began their career under the name Simply II Positive MCs. Originally, Po was the rapper and Pharoahe was a beatboxer, but after realizing his rhyming skill, Monch joined Po as MC. The duo caught the attention of hip hop producer Paul C, who produced a demo for the group in the late 1980s. They signed a record deal with a small record company in Queens named Solid Sound Records. Two producers named Kevin Osborne and Neal Kelley produced two singles for the group. The first was "Memories of Love" in 1987 and the second was "South Side in Effect". In 1987, they released "Memories of Love"; however, it did not receive any radio play. During that time, Def Jam was considering signing the duo, which led to the group changing its name. In an interview with Halftimeonline.net, Monch stated:

We had shopped the demo to Russell Simmons at Def Jam through Bobbito García and we were hype on the name. We had a couple of offers but of course we wanted to sign with Def Jam. He turned us down but he turned Nas down too so I didn't feel that bad. About two weeks later we see Russell in the club and he revisits the idea and we exchange numbers. We call him one time and he was like I’m considering signing the group but first and foremost y'all gotta change that wack ass fucking name! What the fuck is that?! So we went at it hard with names to come up with some new shit because if Russell said the shit is wack it's wack. We were tossing names around and my man Carlos called me. He had pulled out the Organized Con Funk Shun record and he was like what y'all think about Organized Konfusion? That’s how the name came about.

Paul C was murdered in 1989, but the duo went on and signed a record deal with Hollywood BASIC. In 1991, the group released its critically acclaimed self-titled debut album, Organized Konfusion. The album was produced entirely by the duo, and featured only one guest appearance, provided by the group's childhood friend, future D.I.T.C. member O.C., who appeared on the single "Fudge Pudge". The album's single, "Walk Into The Sun", became a minor hit for the group, peaking at No. 15 on the Hot Rap Singles chart. The album itself did not make any Billboard chart, despite high praise from numerous sources, including AllMusic, which granted the album a perfect five-star rating, with reviewer Stanton Swihart stating that it is "arguably the underground [hip-hop] album of the 1990s."

The duo returned in 1994 with their second album, Stress: The Extinction Agenda. This album was once more low on guests, featuring another appearance by O.C., and A Tribe Called Quest's Q-Tip, who both appeared on the song "Let's Organize". The album's lead single "Stress" charted on the Hot Rap Singles chart, but the most famous song from the album is arguably "Stray Bullet", a concept track which sees the MCs describing the travels of a stray bullet in first-person narrative.

In 1996, they appeared on the Red Hot Organization's compilation CD, America is Dying Slowly, alongside Biz Markie, Wu-Tang Clan, and Fat Joe, among many other hip hop artists. The CD, meant to raise awareness of the AIDS epidemic among African American men, was heralded as "a masterpiece" by The Source magazine.

Following the release of Stress, Organized Konfusion moved from Hollywood BASIC to Priority Records. The group's third album, The Equinox, was released in 1997. The album featured a concept, complete with numerous storytelling skits. Many saw the concept as a failure, which led to the album receiving less critical acclaim when compared to the group's previous efforts. Led by the single "Somehow, Someway", the album managed to reach higher on the Billboard charts than its last two albums.

=== Separation ===
After this release, Prince Po and Pharoahe Monch split to pursue solo careers. In a 2005 interview with MVRemix.com, Prince Po discussed the break-up:

Well we broke up because we didn’t want to hear the fans say the same thing like, ‘You’re dope but you are not getting the right promotion’. That gets tiring. We had three albums and fans thought we were dope but didn’t have the right promotion. We didn’t want that shit to run us into the ground. People kept saying that. It was a hopeless situation, but would we always be dope? We wanted to preserve the name. I don’t think the records would have been the classics that they are if we kept on throwing records out there like it was nothing. Right now, we are trying to make some moves and put out an Organized Konfusion remix album. We are just trying to make moves on another side. After we came off the road, I was tired. Besides writing, I was doing most of the business. I would say that I was doing 90% of the business. I would always sit down with Monch and discuss it with him. We did do 50/50 on everything. I was burnt out. I was writing rhymes, making beats, doing the business, talking to the labels, and building with the managers. I made sure the job got done while Monch was able to be an artist. That was cool. Monch is my brother, but I wanted to get to a point where I could be creative, make songs, and worry about being an emcee or producer. Even now, that won’t happen because I have a company and artists who I’m working with. The job will never get easier. It will always get more tedious. The difference is that I’m ready for it now. I had to take that break. On the road, we did a lot of shows and a lot of traveling. I was mentally and physically burnt out. Monch was like, ‘Do I have your blessings to go into the studio and work on some material to get a deal?’ I was for it. His anger wasn’t like he wanted to go and shoot somebody at the label. His anger came out in a way that he had to show the world that he was not done yet.

—Prince Po

=== Solo careers ===
Pharoahe Monch signed a deal with Rawkus Records after the duo's break up, and released a highly acclaimed solo album, Internal Affairs, in 1999. The album just missed a debut in the Top 40 on the Billboard 200 chart, and spawned the Hot 100 hit single "Simon Says". Pharoahe and Rawkus were met with a lawsuit over a Godzilla sample used in the track, which forced Rawkus to pull the album off the shelves, to be re-released without the single. The album was not re-released and remains out of print. OK partner Prince Po joined Pharoahe for an appearance on the track "God Send". Other album guests included Canibus, M.O.P., Busta Rhymes, Apani B, Common, Talib Kweli, Redman, Method Man, Lady Luck and Shabaam Sahdeeq.

Prince Po released his solo debut The Slickness in 2004 on Lex Records. The album almost completely missed the radar, but received fair reviews. Guests included Jemini, Rell, MF Doom and Raekwon.

Between 2004 and 2005, Pharoahe recorded an album while he was signed to MCA/Geffen Records, which was never released. After a bidding war between prominent labels such as Bad Boy Records, Shady Records and Sony Records, Pharoahe Monch signed a deal with Steve Rifkind's SRC Records in February 2006. He released his second album, Desire, on June 26, 2007. Prince Po released his second solo album Prettyblack on August 8, 2006. Around this time he was also featured on Adverse's album David. Another Po solo LP, Saga of the Simian Samurai, was released in November 2007 and was produced entirely by TOMC3. The two had worked together previously on Kool Keith's Project Polaroid.

=== Reunion ===
In 2004, it was announced that the group would be reuniting with a new third member, O.C. who made his debut on Organized Konfusion. But the reunion was called off due to tensions between O.C. and Prince Po.

In interviews conducted during the promotion of Monch's album Desire, questions have repeatedly come up in question to whether or not a reunion would take place. Monch likes to answer the questions with a vague, but optimistic, "Who knows what the future holds". Monch, now signed to a major label, still insists that, if a reunion were to take place, the record would be released on an independent label, citing that the high-end concepts Organized Konfusion deals with and tackles are not heavily supported by major labels.

On March 30, 2009, it was announced that Organized Konfusion would reunite at the 2009 All Points West Festival in Jersey City, New Jersey.

== Discography ==
=== Albums ===
Album information
Organized Konfusion
- Released: October 29, 1991
- Certification: None
- Label: Hollywood Basic
- Singles: "Who Stole My Last Piece of Chicken?"/"The Rough Side of Town", "Fudge Pudge"/"Walk Into the Sun"
Stress: The Extinction Agenda
- Released: August 16, 1994

Charts: No. 187 Billboard 200; No. 28 R&B/ Hip Hop

- Certification: None
- Label: Hollywood Basic
- Singles: "Stress"/"Keep It Koming", "Bring It On"
The Equinox
- Released: September 23, 1997

Charts: No. 141 Billboard 200; No. 29 R&B/ Hip Hop

- Certification: None
- Label: Priority
- Singles: "Somehow, Someway"/"Soundman"/"Numbers"/"9x's out of 10"

=== Appearances ===
- 1992: "The Rough Side of Town (South Side)" and "Open Your Eyes" (from BASIC Beats Sampler)
- ~~~~: "Fat Bottomed Girls (Organized Konfusion Remix)" (from BASIC Queen Bootlegs)
- 1993: "Short Life of a Gangsta" (from Lifers Group album Living Proof)
- 1994: "Bring It On" (Buckwild Remix)" (from Buckwild: Diggin' in the Crates)
- 1995: "4 My Peeps" (from Red Hot Lover Tone album #1 Playa)
- ~~~~: "You Won't Go Far" (from New Jersey Drive, Vol. 2)
- 1996: "Decisions" (from America Is Dying Slowly)
- 1997: "War Games" (from O.C. album Jewelz)
- ~~~~: "Metal Thangz" (from Street Smartz 12")
- ~~~~: "Tender (Remix)" [from Attica Blues 12"]
- ~~~~: "Late Night Action" (from Soul in the Hole (soundtrack))
- 1998: "Rekonstruction" (from DJ Spooky album Riddim Warfare)
- ~~~~: "Murder by Syntax" (from Deep Concentration, Vol. 2: Deeper Concentration)
- 1999: "God Send" (from Pharoahe Monch album Internal Affairs)
- 2000: "Ill Collabo" (from Cella Dwellas album The Last Shall Be First)
- 2002: "Frontline" (from El Da Sensei album Relax, Relate, Release)
- 2009: "Then And Now" (from Prince Po EP X Files EP)
- 2013: "3-O-Clock" (from Marco Polo album PA2: The Director's Cut)
- 2014: "Smash" (from Prince Po & Oh No album Animal Serum)
