= Stress: The Extinction Agenda =

Studio album by Organized Konfusion
- Released: August 16, 1994
- Recorded: 1993–1994
- Studios: Battery, Unique, and Power Play, New York
- Genre: Hip hop
- Length: 45:34
- Label: Hollywood BASIC / Elektra
- Producers: Organized Konfusion; Buckwild; Rockwilder

Organized Konfusion chronology
Organized Konfusion (1991)	Stress: The Extinction Agenda (1994)	The Equinox (1997)

Singles from Stress: The Extinction Agenda
- 1. "Stress" Released: March 14, 1994

Stress: The Extinction Agenda is the second full-length album by Queens hip hop duo Organized Konfusion, released on August 16, 1994, on Hollywood BASIC.

== Album information ==
The group went outside its past self-production and got help from future star producers Buckwild and Rockwilder. The album features O.C. and A Tribe Called Quest's Q-Tip. The album's tone is generally darker than that of its predecessor, with subject matter falling under the album's title. The album is now out of print.

The cover was painted by the late Matt Reid AKA Matt Doo of Dooable Arts, who later committed suicide. Prince Po would later write "Be Easy", a song dedicated to him from his album The Slickness. He also designed the cover for Company Flow's seminal Funcrusher Plus.

== Reception ==
Professional ratings
Review scores
Source	Rating
AllMusic	4.5/5 stars
Chicago Tribune	2.5/4 stars
RapReviews	9/10
The Rolling Stone Album Guide	3.5/5 stars
The Source	4/5 stars

Stress: The Extinction Agenda was well received and is considered to be an underground hip hop classic. Spin magazine included it on Spin's list of the "10 Best Albums You Didn't Hear In '95".

The Source said that, "The essence of Organized Konfusion is pure lyricism. More so than any other artists out now, Monch and Prince are masters of words and phrases... they become verbal contortionists, creating moving molecules of syllables and sounds." In 1998, the album was included as one of The Source's 100 Best Rap Albums.

Rap Pages said, "This is a must-have LP for any aspiring lyricist, as well as for avid fans who are tired of the saturated, unexceptional, untalented, crime-related, or sexual, close-minded MCs." Urban Latino said, "[Organized Konfusion] create a sophisticated hip-hop style that is often as innovative as it is infectious... there's enough head-bobbing and bounce-type material here to keep the attention of even the most jaded listener."

== Track listing ==
All tracks are written by Lawrence Baskerville and Troy Jamerson and produced by Organized Konfusion except where noted.

No.	Title	Writer(s)	Producer(s)	Length
1.	"Intro"			2:03
2.	"Stress"	Baskerville; Jamerson; Charles Mingus	Buckwild	4:03
3.	"The Extinction Agenda"	Baskerville; Jamerson; Herbie Hancock		3:59
4.	"Thirteen"		Buckwild	3:54
5.	"Black Sunday"			3:13
6.	"Drop Bombs"			1:35
7.	"Bring It On"			3:16
8.	"Why"		Buckwild; Organized Konfusion	4:10
9.	"Let's Organize" (featuring O.C. and Q-Tip)	Baskerville; Lawrence; Patrice Rushen		4:21
10.	"3-2-1"			3:26
11.	"Keep It Koming"	Baskerville; Lawrence; Julian Adderley		3:58
12.	"Stray Bullet"			3:44
13.	"Maintain"		Rockwilder	4:19
Total length:				45:35

== Charts ==
Chart (1994)	Peak position
US Billboard 200	187
US Top R&B/Hip-Hop Albums (Billboard)	28

=== Singles ===
Year	Song	Hot Rap Singles
1994	"Stress"	50
