= Present (Timbaland & Magoo album) =

Timbaland and Magoo: Present

Compilation album by Timbaland & Magoo
- Released: March 14, 2005
- Recorded: 1994–2003
- Genre: Hip hop
- Length: 1:16:17
- Label: Interscope
- Producer: Timbaland

Timbaland & Magoo chronology
| Under Construction, Part II (2003) | Timbaland and Magoo: Present (2005) |

Timbaland and Magoo: Present is a compilation album released by American hip-hop duo Timbaland & Magoo on March 14, 2005. The collection includes a seventeen-track album, containing a selection of the duo's singles and favourite tracks, as well material from Timbaland's solo album Tim's Bio: Life from da Bassment, packaged with a bonus DVD featuring eleven music videos, including six of the duo's own video clips, plus additional videos by Aaliyah and Justin Timberlake. Six months before the album was released, a promotional taster extended play was released on 12" vinyl. It includes four tracks.

== Track listing ==
| No. | Title | Writer(s) | Producer(s) | Length |
|---|---|---|---|---|
| 1. | "Clock Strikes" (featuring Mad Skillz) | Timothy Mosley, Melvin Barcliff | Timbaland, Barry Hankerson, Jomo Hankerson | 4:51 |
| 2. | "15 After Da Hour" | Timothy Mosley, Melvin Barcliff | Timbaland | 4:08 |
| 3. | "Man Undercover" (featuring Aaliyah) | Timothy Mosley, Melvin Barcliff, Missy Elliott | Timbaland | 4:41 |
| 4. | "Joy" (featuring Ginuwine and Playa) | Timothy Mosley, Melvin Barcliff, Juwan Peacock, Stephen Garrett | Timbland, Smokey | 4:55 |
| 5. | "Here We Come" (featuring Missy Elliott) | Timothy Mosley, Melvin Barcliff, Missy Elliott, Paul Webster, Robert Harris | Timbaland | 4:21 |
| 6. | "Who Am I" (featuring Twista) | Timothy Mosley, Carl Mitchell | Timbaland | 4:16 |
| 7. | "John Blaze" (featuring Aaliyah and Missy Elliott) | Timothy Mosley, Missy Elliott | Timbaland | 4:00 |
| 8. | "3:30 in the Morning" (featuring Virginia Williams) | Timothy Mosley, Missy Elliott | | 3:29 |
| 9. | "Drop" (featuring Fatman Scoop) | Timothy Mosley, Isaac Freeman III, Melvin Barcliff | Timbaland | 6:00 |
| 10. | "All Y'all" (featuring Sebastian and Tweet) | Timothy Mosley, Melvin Barcliff, Charlene Keys, Garland Mosley | Timbaland | 3:57 |
| 11. | "Party People" (featuring Jay-Z and Twista) | Timothy Mosley, Melvin Barcliff, Shawn Carter, Carl Mitchell | Timbaland | 5:18 |
| 12. | "I Am Music" (featuring Aaliyah and Static Major) | Timothy Mosley, Stephen Garrett | Timbaland | 3:59 |
| 13. | "Cop That Shit" (featuring Missy Elliott) | Timothy Mosley, Melvin Barcliff, Dennis Taylor, Edward Archer, Eric Barrier, Freddie Byrd, Howie Thompson, Jack Hill, Jackey Beavers, Lael Williams, Lana Moorer, Missy Elliott, Preston Joyner, William Griffin | Timbaland | 3:33 |
| 14. | "Shenanigans" (featuring Bubba Sparxxx) | Timothy Mosley, Melvin Barcliff, Lael Williams, Warren Mathis | Timbaland | 3:46 |
| 15. | "N 2 Da Music" (featuring Brandy) | Timothy Mosley, Melvin Barcliff, Timothy Clayton | Timbaland | 3:57 |
| 16. | "Hold On" (featuring Wyclef Jean) | Timothy Mosley, Melvin Barcliff, Timothy Clayton, Wyclef Jean | Timbaland | 5:04 |
| 17. | "Indian Flute" (featuring Sebastian and Raje Shwari) | Timothy Mosley, Melvin Barcliff, Garland Mosley, Raje Shwari | Timbaland | 3:21 |

Deluxe Edition Bonus DVD
| No. | Title | Length |
|---|---|---|
| 1. | "We At It Again" (featuring Sebastian and Static Major) |
| 2. | "Lobster & Scrimp" (featuring Jay-Z) |
| 3. | "Drop" (featuring Fatman Scoop) |
| 4. | "All Y'all" (featuring Tweet and Sebastian) |
| 5. | "Cop That Shit" (featuring Missy Elliott) |
| 6. | "Indian Flute" (featuring Sebastian and Raje Shwari) |
| 7. | "Try Again" (Aaliyah featuring Timbaland) |
| 8. | "More Than A Woman" (Aaliyah featuring Timbaland) |
| 9. | "Cry Me A River" (Justin Timberlake featuring Timbaland) |
| 10. | "Cop That Shit" (Behind The Scenes) |

Promotional 12" vinyl EP
| No. | Title | Writer(s) | Producer(s) | Length |
|---|---|---|---|---|
| 1. | "Cop That Shit" (featuring Missy Elliott) | Timothy Mosley, Melvin Barcliff, Dennis Taylor, Edward Archer, Eric Barrier, Freddie Byrd, Howie Thompson, Jack Hill, Jackey Beavers, Lael Williams, Lana Moorer, Missy Elliott, Preston Joyner, William Griffin | Timbaland | 3:33 |
| 2. | "Party People" (featuring Jay-Z and Twista) | Timothy Mosley, Melvin Barcliff, Shawn Carter, Carl Mitchell | Timbaland | 5:18 |
| 3. | "Indian Flute" (featuring Sebastian and Raje Shwari) | Timothy Mosley, Melvin Barcliff, Garland Mosley, Raje Shwari | Timbaland | 3:21 |
| 4. | "Drop" (featuring Fatman Scoop) | Timothy Mosley, Isaac Freeman III, Melvin Barcliff | Timbaland | 6:00 |
