= Clock Strikes =

Single by Timbaland & Magoo

from the album Welcome to Our World
- Released: April 14, 1998
- Recorded: 1997
- Genre: Hip-hop
- Length: 3:43
- Label: Blackground; Atlantic
- Songwriters: Timothy Mosley; Melvin Barcliff
- Producer: Timbaland

Timbaland & Magoo singles chronology
"Luv 2 Luv U" (1997)	"Clock Strikes" (1998)	"Drop" (2001)

"Clock Strikes" is a song by hip-hop duo Timbaland & Magoo, released as the third single from their debut studio album, Welcome to Our World, on April 14, 1998. The track features rapper Mad Skillz. The song peaked at #37 on the Billboard Hot 100 singles chart, making it their second top 40 hit on the chart after their debut single "Up Jumps da Boogie". It also peaked at on the Hot R&B/Hip-Hop Singles & Tracks chart.

The music video featured a remake of the famous scene from the movie “From Dusk till Dawn” featuring actress Natashia Williams and choreographed by Fatima Robinson.

== Track listing ==
- CD single
1. "Clock Strikes" (Remix - Radio Edit) - 3:43
2. "Clock Strikes" (Album Version) - 4:41
- Maxi CD single
1. "Clock Strikes" (Remix - Radio Edit) - 3:43
2. "Clock Strikes" (Remix - Extended Radio Edit) - 5:18
3. "Clock Strikes" (Remix - Extended Instrumental) - 5:18
4. "Clock Strikes" (Remix - Extended Acapella) - 5:18

== Chart positions ==
Chart (1998)	Peak position
U.S. Billboard Hot 100	37
U.S. Billboard Hot R&B/Hip-Hop Singles & Tracks	24
