= Welcome to Our World =

Studio album by Timbaland & Magoo
- Released: November 11, 1997
- Recorded: 1994–1997
- Genre: Hip hop
- Length: 1:14:20
- Labels: Blackground; Atlantic
- Producers: Timbaland; Smoke E. Digglera

Timbaland & Magoo chronology
Welcome to Our World (1997)	Indecent Proposal (2001)

Timbaland chronology
Welcome to Our World (1997)	Tim's Bio: Life from da Bassment (1998)

Singles from Welcome to Our World
- 1. "Up Jumps da Boogie" Released: July 11, 1997; 2. "Luv 2 Luv U" Released: 1997; 3. "Clock Strikes" Released: April 14, 1998

Welcome to Our World is the debut studio album by American hip hop duo Timbaland & Magoo. It was released on November 11, 1997, through Blackground Entertainment and Atlantic Records. The album was produced by Timbaland, except for the song "Joy", which was produced with Smoke E. Digglera. It features guest appearances from Missy "Misdemeanor" Elliott, Aaliyah, Ginuwine, Shaunta Montgomery, and Mad Skillz.

The album peaked at number 33 on the US Billboard 200 albums chart. It was certified Platinum by the Recording Industry Association of America on May 12, 1998, for selling over a million copies. It spawned three singles: the official singles "Up Jumps da Boogie" and "Clock Strikes", and the promotional single "Luv 2 Luv Ya". Its lead single, "Up Jumps da Boogie", was certified Gold by the RIAA on August 26, 1997.

In August 2021, Blackground rebranded as Blackground 2.0, with Barry Hankerson remaining as founder. Blackground 2.0 signed a distribution deal with Empire Distribution, which will re-release the label's catalogue onto digital download sites and streaming services. Welcome to Our World was re-released on August 27, 2021.

== Critical reception ==
Professional ratings
Review scores
Source	Rating
AllMusic	4/5 stars
Robert Christgau	A−
Entertainment Weekly	B
Spin	8/10

The Village Voice wrote that Timbaland & Magoo "bring hiphop back to its party-arty roots, creating something fun and fabulous in the hotel-motel-Holiday Inn tradition... These jesters aren't interested in keeping it real: They know much more creativity goes into making it surreal."

== Track listing ==
No.	Title	Writer(s)	Producer(s)	Length
1.	"Beep Beep"	Timothy Mosley; Melissa Elliott	Timbaland	4:17
2.	"Feel It"	Mosley	Timbaland	5:07
3.	"Up Jumps da Boogie" (featuring Missy "Misdemeanor" Elliott and Aaliyah)	Mosley; Melvin Barcliff; Elliott; Smith; Rod Temperton	Timbaland	5:00
4.	"Clock Strikes"	Mosley; Barcliff	Timbaland	4:51
5.	"15 After Da Hour"	Mosley; Barcliff	Timbaland	4:08
6.	"Ms. Parker (Interlude)" (featuring Love Jon)	Mosley	Timbaland	0:44
7.	"Luv 2 Luv U (Remix)" (featuring Shaunta Montgomery and Playa)	Mosley; Barcliff; Stephen Garrett	Timbaland	6:41
8.	"Luv 2 Luv U" (featuring St. Nick and Playa)	Mosley; Barcliff; Garrett	Timbaland	4:27
9.	"Smoke In Da Air" (featuring Playa)	Mosley; Barcliff; Garrett	Timbaland	4:17
10.	"Intro Buddha (Interlude)" (featuring Buddha Brother, Big B and DJ Law)	Mosley	Timbaland	1:49
11.	"Peepin' My Style"	Mosley; Barcliff	Timbaland	4:54
12.	"Writtin' Rhymes"	Mosley; Barcliff; Troy Mitchell	Timbaland	4:33
13.	"Deep in Your Memory"	Mosley; Barcliff	Timbaland	3:35
14.	"Clock Strikes" (Remix)	Mosley; Barcliff; Glen Larson; Stu Phillips	Timbaland	3:43
15.	"Sex Beat (Interlude)"	Mosley	Timbaland	1:45
16.	"Man Undercover" (featuring Aaliyah)	Mosley; Barcliff; Elliott	Timbaland	4:41
17.	"Joy" (featuring Ginuwine and Playa)	Mosley; Barcliff; Jawaan Peacock; Garrett	Timbaland; Smokey	4:55
18.	"Up Jumps da Boogie (Remix)" (featuring Missy "Misdemeanor" Elliott)	Mosley; Elliott; Smith; Temperton	Timbaland	5:01
Total length:				1:14:20

Sample credits

- Track 1 contains a sample of "The Rain (Supa Dupa Fly)" by Melissa "Missy" Elliott
- Track 14 contains a sample of the Knight Rider theme by Glen A. Larson and Stu Phillips

== Charts ==
Chart performance for Welcome to Our World
Chart (1997)	Peak position
US Billboard 200	33
US Top R&B/Hip-Hop Albums (Billboard)	9

== Certifications ==
Region	Certification	Certified units/sales
United States (RIAA)	Platinum	1,000,000^{^}
^{^} Shipments figures based on certification alone.
