= Soundbombing III =

2002 hip hop compilation album

Compilation album by Rawkus Records
- Released: June 4, 2002
- Genre: Hip-hop
- Label: Rawkus
- Producer: Ayatollah; Rockwilder; Hi-Tek; V.I.C.; Anthony Tidd; Zap Mama; Q-Tip; The Beatnuts; DJ Quik; Novel; The Roots; Curt Gowdy; Jocko

Rawkus Records chronology
Lyricist Lounge 2 (2000)	Soundbombing III (2002)	Best of Decade I: 1995–2005 (2005)

Singles from Soundbombing III
- 1. "The Life" Released: 2002; 2. "Crew Deep" Released: 2002; 3. "Put It in the Air" Released: 2002

Professional ratings
Review scores
Source	Rating
Allmusic	3/5 stars
Entertainment Weekly	B−
HipHopDX	3/5 stars
Pitchfork	2.2/10
RapReviews	3.5/5 stars

Soundbombing III is a compilation album by Rawkus Records, the third installment of their Soundbombing series. It was released on June 4, 2002, and was the first album released after Rawkus signed a distribution deal with MCA. The compilation was mixed by Cipha Sounds and Mr. Choc. Three songs from the album were released as singles: "The Life", "Crew Deep", and "Put It in the Air".

== Track listing ==
#	Title	Producer(s)	Performer (s)	Other album appearance(s)
1	"Intro"		Cipha Sounds, Mr. Choc	
2	"The Life"	Ayatollah	Styles P, Pharoahe Monch	A Gangster and a Gentleman
3	"Freak Daddy"	Rockwilder	Mos Def	Previously unreleased
4	"Skit"		*Interlude*	
5	"Crew Deep"	Hi-Tek	Skillz, Kandi, Missy Elliott	I Ain't Mad No More
6	"My Life"	V.I.C.	Kool G Rap, Capone-N-Noreaga	The Giancana Story
7	"Round & Round (Remix)"	Hi-Tek	Hi-Tek, Jonell, Pharoahe Monch, Kool G Rap, Method Man	Hi-Teknology
8	"Yelling Away"	Anthony Tidd, Zap Mama	Zap Mama, Talib Kweli, Common	Ancestry in Progress
9	"Skit"		*Interlude*	
10	"What Lies Beneath"	Q-Tip	Q-Tip	
11	"The Trouble Is..."	The Beatnuts	The Beatnuts	
12	"Put It In The Air"	DJ Quik	Talib Kweli, DJ Quik	Quality
13	"They Don't Flow"	Novel	Novel, Skillz	
14	"Rhymes & Ammo"	The Roots	The Roots, Talib Kweli	Phrenology (as a hidden track)
15	"Spit Again"	Curt Gowdy	Cocoa Brovaz, Dawn Penn	
16	"On The Block"	Jocko	R.A. the Rugged Man, L. Dionne and Human Beatbox Bub	Die, Rugged Man, Die
17	"Outro"		Cipha Sounds, Mr. Choc	

== Charts ==
=== Album ===
Chart (2002)	Peak position
US Billboard 200	23
US Top R&B/Hip-Hop Albums (Billboard)	8

=== Singles ===
"The Life"

Chart (2002)	Peak position
US Hot R&B/Hip-Hop Songs (Billboard)	66
US R&B/Hip-Hop Airplay (Billboard)	65
UK Singles (OCC)	50

"Crew Deep"

Chart (2002)	Peak position
US Hot R&B/Hip-Hop Songs (Billboard)	83
US Hot R&B/Hip-Hop Singles Sales (Billboard)	15
US Hot 100 Singles Sales (Billboard)	41
