= Cheers 2 U =

Studio album by Playa
- Released: March 24, 1998
- Recorded: July 1997 – February 1998
- Studio: Manhattan Center Studios (New York, NY); Mastersound Studios (Virginia Beach, VA); Soundtrack Studios (New York, NY); Axis Studios (New York, NY); Scream Studios (California)
- Genre: Contemporary R&B
- Length: 1:05:42
- Label: Blackground; Def Soul; Def Jam
- Producer: James Earl Jones III; Smoke E. Digglera; Timbaland

Singles from Cheers 2 U
- 1. "Don't Stop the Music" Released: September 9, 1997; 2. "Cheers 2 U" Released: March 10, 1998; 3. "I Gotta Know" Released: 1998

Professional ratings
Review scores
Source	Rating
AllMusic	4/5 stars

Cheers 2 U is the only studio album by American R&B group Playa. It was released on March 24, 1998, through Blackground Records, Def Soul and Def Jam Recordings. Recording sessions took place at Manhattan Center Studios, Soundtrack Studios and Axis Studios in New York City, at Master Sound Studios in Virginia Beach and at Scream Studios in California. Production was handled by member Smoke E. Digglera, Timbaland and James Earl Jones, with Derrick "D-Man" McElveen and Static Major serving as co-producers. It features guest appearances from Magoo, Aaliyah, Foxy Brown and Missy Elliott.

== Commercial performance ==
In the United States, the album debuted at number 86 on the Billboard 200 and number 19 on the Top R&B/Hip-Hop Albums charts. The album was supported with three singles: "Don't Stop the Music", "Cheers 2 U" and "I Gotta Know". Its lead single made it to number 73 on the Billboard Hot 100 and number 26 on the Hot R&B/Hip-Hop Songs charts. The second single off of the album reached number 38 on the Billboard Hot 100 and number 10 on the Hot R&B/Hip-Hop Songs charts. The album's third and final single previously appeared on Def Jam's How to Be a Player soundtrack.

== Track listing ==
No.	Title	Writer(s)	Producer(s)	Length
1.	"Intro (Interlude)" (featuring Magoo)	Stephen Garrett; Benjamin Bush; Melvin Barcliff; Jawaan Peacock; Norman Gimbel; Antônio Carlos Jobim; Vinícius De Moraes	Smokey	1:39
2.	"Don't Stop the Music"	Garrett; Bush; Timothy Mosley; Sylvester Stewart; Cavin Yarbrough; Alisa Peoples	Timbaland	4:45
3.	"All the Way"	Garrett; Bush; Mosley	Timbaland	4:56
4.	"Everybody Wanna Luv Somebody"	Garrett; Bush; Peacock; Mosley	Smokey; Timbaland (co.)	5:18
5.	"Together"	Garrett; Bush; Peacock	Smokey	3:55
6.	"Derby City (Interlude)" (featuring Magoo)	Garrett; Bush; Barcliff; Peacock	Smokey	2:24
7.	"I-65"	Garrett; Bush; Peacock	Smokey	4:36
8.	"Cheers 2 U"	Garrett; Mosley	Timbaland	5:11
9.	"Ms. Parker" (featuring Missy "Misdemeanor" Elliott)	Melissa Elliott; Mosley	Timbaland	5:02
10.	"Top of the World"	Garrett; Peacock; Mosley	Timbaland	4:58
11.	"One Man Woman" (featuring Aaliyah)	Garrett; Peacock	Smokey	4:30
12.	"I'll B 2 C U"	Garrett; Bush; Peacock; Mosley; Keith Crouch; Rahsaan Patterson; Kevin Todd Jones	Timbaland	4:25
13.	"Push"	Garrett; Bush; Peacock	Smokey	4:01
14.	"Buggin' Over You"	Garrett; Bush; Peacock	Smokey; Static (co.)	3:51
15.	"Gospel Interlude"	Garrett; Bush; Peacock		2:12
16.	"I Gotta Know" (featuring Foxy Brown)	Bush; Inga Marchand; James Earl Jones; Derrick McElveen; Lorenzo Patterson; Andre Young	James E. Jones; Derick "D Man" McElveen (co.)	3:59
Total length:				1:05:42

Sample credits

- Track 1 contains a sample from "The Girl from Ipanema" written by Norman Gimbel, Antônio Carlos Jobim and Vinícius De Moraes as recorded by Stan Getz and Astrud Gilberto.
- Track 2 contains interpolations of "Thank You" written by Sylvester Stewart and "Don't Stop The Music" written and performed by Yarbrough and Peoples.
- Track 12 contains interpolations from "Baby" written by Keith Crouch, Rahsaan Patterson and Kipper Jones and "Bad Girls" written by Joe Esposito, Edward Hokenson, Bruce Sudano and performed by Donna Summer.
- Track 16 contains an interpolation of "Message to B.A." written by Lorenzo Patterson and Andre Young and performed by N.W.A.

== Personnel ==
- Jawaan "Smoke E. Digglera" Peacock – vocals, vocal arrangement (tracks: 10, 13, 14, 16), arrangement (track 15), producer (tracks: 1, 4–7, 11, 13, 14), A&R
- Stephen "Static Major" Garrett – vocals, vocal arrangement (tracks: 8, 10, 13, 14, 16), arrangement (track 15), co-producer (track 14), A&R
- Benjamin "Digital Black" Bush – vocals, vocal arrangement (tracks: 10, 13, 14, 16), arrangement (track 15), A&R
- Melvin "Magoo" Barcliff – vocals (tracks: 1, 6)
- Melissa "Missy" Elliott – vocals (track 9)
- Aaliyah Dana Haughton – vocals (track 11)
- Inga "Foxy Brown" Marchand – vocals (track 16)
- Bill Pettaway – additional guitar (track 3), guitar (track 10)
- Kerie Cooper – keyboards (track 16)
- Timothy "Timbaland" Mosley – producer (tracks: 2, 3, 8–10, 12), co-producer (track 4), recording (track 3), mixing (tracks: 2, 3, 8, 10, 12)
- James Earl Jones III – producer & vocal arrangement (track 16)
- Derrick "D-Man" McElveen – co-producer (track 16), additional programming (tracks: 13, 14)
- Jimmy Douglass – recording (tracks: 1–3, 6, 9, 15), mixing (tracks: 1–6, 8–10, 12, 15)
- Steve Sola – recording (tracks: 4, 5)
- Wayne Allison – recording (track 7), engineering assistant (track 13)
- Rob Paustian – recording (tracks: 13, 16)
- Conley Abrams – recording (track 14), mixing (tracks: 7, 13, 14, 16)
- Todd Wachsmuth – engineering assistant (tracks: 1, 4, 5, 9, 11)
- James Rosenthal – engineering assistant (tracks: 7, 13)
- Victor Bruno – engineering assistant (track 13)
- James Cruz – mastering
- Barry Hankerson – executive producer
- Jomo Hankerson – executive producer
- Jonathan Mannion – photography
- The Drawing Board – art direction, design

== Charts ==
Chart (1998)	Peak position
US Billboard 200	86
US Top R&B/Hip-Hop Albums (Billboard)	19
