= Undrafted (album) =

Studio album by Troy Hudson
- Released: May 22, 2007
- Recorded: 2006–2007
- Genre: Rap
- Label: Hudson Records
- Producer: Troy Hudson

Undrafted is the debut studio album by National Basketball Association (NBA) player, Troy Hudson under his nickname, T-Hud. It featured guests such as Ray J, Three 6 Mafia, and UGK. The album's title alludes to Hudson being undrafted by the NBA coming out of college.

== Track listing ==
1. Intro – 1:22
2. "Real Shit" – 3:49
3. "True Love" feat. Ray J – 4:33
4. "So Here" – 3:16
5. "I'm a Gangsta" feat. Three 6 Mafia – 4:24
6. "Go Getta" – 4:06
7. "Everyday All Day" – 4:34
8. "White 550's" – 3:19
9. "Good Weather Music (Never Thought)" feat. Static Major & UGK – 4:06
10. "Back to the Block" feat. Mo-Unique – 5:17
11. "Rich as a Bitch" – 3:13
12. "Good Life" feat. Darius Harrison – 3:56
13. "The Hoods Only" – 4:20
14. "Pussy Whipped" feat. Mo-Unique – 4:39
15. "No No No" – 3:38
16. "How I Get By" feat. TQ – 3:43
17. "Roll with Me" – 3:59
18. "Chief of the Midwest" – 8:28
