= 2001–02 Orlando Magic season =

NBA professional basketball team season

- Head coach: Doc Rivers
- General manager: John Gabriel
- Owners: RDV Sports, Inc.
- Arena: TD Waterhouse Centre

Results
- Record: 44–38 (.537)
- Place: Division: 3rd (Atlantic); Conference: 5th (Eastern)
- Playoff finish: First round (lost to Hornets 1–3)
- Stats at Basketball Reference

Local media
- Television: Sunshine Network; WBRW

The 2001–02 Orlando Magic season was the 13th season for the Orlando Magic in the National Basketball Association.

== Season summary ==
=== Off-season ===
During the off-season, the Magic signed free agent All-Star center Patrick Ewing to their roster, and re-signed former Magic forward Horace Grant to further strengthen the team's depth.

=== Regular season ===
Early into the regular season in November, the Magic traded Bo Outlaw to the Phoenix Suns in exchange for Jud Buechler in a three-team trade. With the addition of Grant and Ewing, the Magic played around .500 in winning percentage with a 25–24 record at the All-Star break. However, Grant Hill only played just 14 games this season, averaging 16.8 points, 8.9 rebounds and 4.6 assists per game, as he had to get more surgery on his bad ankle. Despite Hill's injury, the Magic posted a six-game winning streak in March, and finished in third place in the Atlantic Division with a 44–38 record, which earned them the fifth seed in the Eastern Conference.

Tracy McGrady had another stellar season, averaging 25.6 points, 7.9 rebounds, 5.3 assists and 1.6 steals per game, along with 103 three-point field goals, and was named to the All-NBA First Team. In addition, second-year star Mike Miller averaged 15.2 points per game and contributed 116 three-point field goals, while Darrell Armstrong provided the team with 12.4 points, 5.5 assists and 1.9 steals per game, along with 139 three-point field goals, Troy Hudson contributed 11.7 points and 3.1 assists per game, and Pat Garrity provided with 11.1 points and 4.2 rebounds per game, and led the Magic with 169 three-point field goals. Meanwhile, Grant averaged 8.0 points and 6.3 rebounds per game, Monty Williams contributed 7.1 points and 3.5 rebounds per game, and Ewing provided with 6.0 points and 4.0 rebounds per game.

During the NBA All-Star weekend at the First Union Center in Philadelphia, Pennsylvania, McGrady was selected for the 2002 NBA All-Star Game, as a member of the Eastern Conference All-Star team. Meanwhile, Miller participated in the NBA Three-Point Shootout, and was also selected for the NBA Rookie Challenge Game, as a member of the Sophomores team. McGrady finished in fourth place in Most Valuable Player voting with 7 first-place votes; Hudson finished tied in fifth place in Sixth Man of the Year voting, and also finished tied in seventh place in Most Improved Player voting.

The Magic finished 22nd in the NBA in home-game attendance, with an attendance of 621,121 at the TD Waterhouse Centre during the regular season.

=== NBA playoffs ===
In the Eastern Conference First Round of the 2002 NBA playoffs, the Magic faced off against the 4th–seeded Charlotte Hornets, who were led by the trio of Jamal Mashburn, David Wesley, and All-Star guard Baron Davis. Despite both teams finishing with the same regular-season record, the Hornets had home-court advantage in the series. The Magic lost Game 1 to the Hornets on the road, 80–79 at the Charlotte Coliseum, but managed to win Game 2 on the road in overtime, 111–103 to even the series. However, the Magic lost the next two games at home, which included a Game 4 loss to the Hornets at the TD Waterhouse Centre, 102–85, thus losing the series in four games.

=== Aftermath ===
Following the season, Ewing retired after seventeen seasons in the NBA, and would take a job as an assistant coach for the Washington Wizards. Meanwhile, Hudson signed as a free agent with the Minnesota Timberwolves, Williams signed with the Philadelphia 76ers, and Buechler and Dee Brown both retired.

== Draft picks ==
Round	Pick	Player	Position	Nationality	College
1	15	Steven Hunter	C	United States	DePaul
1	22	Jeryl Sasser	SG	United States	SMU
2	31	Omar Cook	PG	United States	St. John's

== Roster ==
2001–02 Orlando Magic roster
Players

Pos.	No.	Player	Height	Weight	DOB	From
G	10	Darrell Armstrong	6 ft 0 in (1.83 m)	170 lb (77 kg)	1968–06–22	Fayetteville State
F	30	Jud Buechler	6 ft 6 in (1.98 m)	220 lb (100 kg)	1968–06–19	Arizona
C	55	Andrew DeClercq	6 ft 10 in (2.08 m)	230 lb (104 kg)	1973–02–01	Florida
C	6	Patrick Ewing	7 ft 0 in (2.13 m)	240 lb (109 kg)	1962–08–05	Georgetown
F	8	Pat Garrity	6 ft 9 in (2.06 m)	238 lb (108 kg)	1976–08–23	Notre Dame
F/C	54	Horace Grant	6 ft 10 in (2.08 m)	215 lb (98 kg)	1965–07–04	Clemson
F	33	Grant Hill	6 ft 8 in (2.03 m)	225 lb (102 kg)	1972–10–05	Duke
G	11	Troy Hudson	6 ft 1 in (1.85 m)	170 lb (77 kg)	1976–03–13	Southern Illinois
C	34	Steven Hunter	7 ft 0 in (2.13 m)	220 lb (100 kg)	1981–10–31	DePaul
G	2	Jaren Jackson	6 ft 4 in (1.93 m)	190 lb (86 kg)	1967–10–27	Georgetown
G	1	Tracy McGrady	6 ft 8 in (2.03 m)	210 lb (95 kg)	1979–05–24	Mt. Zion HS (NC)
F	50	Mike Miller	6 ft 8 in (2.03 m)	210 lb (95 kg)	1980–02–19	Florida
F	52	Don Reid	6 ft 8 in (2.03 m)	250 lb (113 kg)	1973–12–30	Georgetown
G	5	Jeryl Sasser	6 ft 6 in (1.98 m)	200 lb (91 kg)	1979–02–13	SMU
F	3	Monty Williams	6 ft 8 in (2.03 m)	225 lb (102 kg)	1971–10–08	Notre Dame

Coaches
Head coach
- Doc Rivers
Assistant(s)
- Johnny Davis
- Paul Pressey
- Tom Sterner
- Dave Wohl

Legend
- (DP) Unsigned draft pick
- (FA) Free agent
- (S) Suspended
- Injured

Roster
Updated: April 2, 2002

=== Roster Notes ===
- Small forward Grant Hill played 14 games (his last game being on November 26, 2001), but missed the rest of the season and the playoffs after undergoing season-ending surgery on December 19, 2001, to remove bone spurs from his left ankle, and it was the second surgery he had in a year and the third operation on his left ankle.

== Regular season ==
=== Season standings ===
Atlantic Division	W	L	PCT	GB	Home	Road	Div
y-New Jersey Nets	52	30	.634	–	33–8	19–22	16–8
x-Boston Celtics	49	33	.598	3	27–14	22–19	17–7
x-Orlando Magic	44	38	.537	8	27–14	17–24	12–12
x-Philadelphia 76ers	43	39	.524	9	22–19	21–20	14–11
e-Washington Wizards	37	45	.451	15	22–19	15–26	12–13
e-Miami Heat	36	46	.439	16	18–23	18–23	10–14
e-New York Knicks	30	52	.366	22	19–22	11–30	4–20

#	Eastern Conference				
#	Team	W	L	PCT	GB
1	c-New Jersey Nets	52	30	.634	–
2	y-Detroit Pistons	50	32	.610	2
3	x-Boston Celtics	49	33	.598	3
4	x-Charlotte Hornets	44	38	.537	8
5	x-Orlando Magic	44	38	.537	8
6	x-Philadelphia 76ers	43	39	.524	9
7	x-Toronto Raptors	42	40	.512	10
8	x-Indiana Pacers	42	40	.512	10
9	e-Milwaukee Bucks	41	41	.500	11
10	e-Washington Wizards	37	45	.451	15
11	e-Miami Heat	36	46	.439	16
12	e-Atlanta Hawks	33	49	.402	19
13	e-New York Knicks	30	52	.366	22
14	e-Cleveland Cavaliers	29	53	.354	23
15	e-Chicago Bulls	21	61	.256	31

z – clinched division title
y – clinched division title
x – clinched playoff spot

== Playoffs ==
2002 playoff game log
First round: 1–3 (home: 0–2; road: 1–1)

Game	Date	Team	Score	High points	High rebounds	High assists	Location Attendance	Series
1	April 20	@ Charlotte	L 79–80	Tracy McGrady (20)	Horace Grant (10)	Tracy McGrady (6)	Charlotte Coliseum; 9,505	0–1
2	April 23	@ Charlotte	W 111–103 (OT)	Tracy McGrady (31)	Tracy McGrady (11)	Tracy McGrady (7)	Charlotte Coliseum; 10,323	1–1
3	April 27	Charlotte	L 100–110 (OT)	Tracy McGrady (37)	Garrity, Grant (10)	Darrell Armstrong (8)	TD Waterhouse Centre; 16,754	1–2
4	April 30	Charlotte	L 85–102	Tracy McGrady (35)	Patrick Ewing (10)	Tracy McGrady (6)	TD Waterhouse Centre; 16,254	1–3

2002 schedule

== Player statistics ==
=== Regular season ===
Player	POS	GP	GS	MP	REB	AST	STL	BLK	PTS	MPG	RPG	APG	SPG	BPG	PPG
Darrell Armstrong	PG	82	79	2,730	319	453	157	10	1,015	33.3	3.9	5.5	1.9	.1	12.4
Troy Hudson	PG	81	4	1,854	145	255	57	6	950	22.9	1.8	3.1	.7	.1	11.7
Pat Garrity	PF	80	43	2,406	338	99	61	28	884	30.1	4.2	1.2	.8	.4	11.1
Tracy McGrady	SG	76	76	2,912	597	400	119	73	1,948	38.3	7.9	5.3	1.6	1.0	25.6
Horace Grant	C	76	76	2,210	481	104	57	49	608	29.1	6.3	1.4	.8	.6	8.0
Monty Williams	SF	68	19	1,284	235	96	49	17	484	18.9	3.5	1.4	.7	.3	7.1
Don Reid	PF	68	5	714	176	27	20	44	224	10.5	2.6	.4	.3	.6	3.3
Patrick Ewing	C	65	4	901	263	35	22	45	390	13.9	4.0	.5	.3	.7	6.0
Mike Miller	SF	63	53	2,123	273	198	47	23	956	33.7	4.3	3.1	.7	.4	15.2
Andrew DeClercq	C	61	14	633	163	22	23	24	162	10.4	2.7	.4	.4	.4	2.7
Jud Buechler^{†}	SF	60	2	630	108	29	20	8	105	10.5	1.8	.5	.3	.1	1.8
Steven Hunter	C	53	21	516	97	5	5	43	189	9.7	1.8	.1	.1	.8	3.6
Grant Hill	SF	14	14	512	125	64	8	4	235	36.6	8.9	4.6	.6	.3	16.8
Bo Outlaw^{†}	PF	10	0	160	29	5	9	9	34	16.0	2.9	.5	.9	.9	3.4
Jaren Jackson	SG	9	0	144	17	8	5	0	39	16.0	1.9	.9	.6	.0	4.3
Dee Brown	PG	7	0	65	9	2	3	1	7	9.3	1.3	.3	.4	.1	1.0
Jeryl Sasser	SG	7	0	36	7	2	3	0	10	5.1	1.0	.3	.4	.0	1.4

- ^{†} Denotes player spent time with another team in the season. Stats reflect time with the Magic only.

=== Playoffs ===
Player	POS	GP	GS	MP	REB	AST	STL	BLK	PTS	MPG	RPG	APG	SPG	BPG	PPG
Tracy McGrady	SG	4	4	178	25	22	2	7	123	44.5	6.3	5.5	.5	1.8	30.8
Darrell Armstrong	PG	4	4	158	11	13	5	0	61	39.5	2.8	3.3	1.3	.0	15.3
Pat Garrity	PF	4	4	147	30	9	2	1	34	36.8	7.5	2.3	.5	.3	8.5
Horace Grant	C	4	4	127	31	9	3	1	18	31.8	7.8	2.3	.8	.3	4.5
Monty Williams	SF	4	3	93	22	9	3	0	34	23.3	5.5	2.3	.8	.0	8.5
Mike Miller	SF	4	1	72	5	5	4	0	19	18.0	1.3	1.3	1.0	.0	4.8
Troy Hudson	PG	4	0	106	4	6	0	0	51	26.5	1.0	1.5	.0	.0	12.8
Patrick Ewing	C	4	0	67	22	4	1	4	26	16.8	5.5	1.0	.3	1.0	6.5
Don Reid	PF	4	0	38	6	0	1	2	9	9.5	1.5	.0	.3	.5	2.3
Jaren Jackson	SG	3	0	5	1	0	0	0	0	1.7	.3	.0	.0	.0	.0
Jud Buechler	SF	2	0	10	1	1	1	0	0	5.0	.5	.5	.5	.0	.0
Andrew DeClercq	C	2	0	9	0	0	0	0	0	4.5	.0	.0	.0	.0	.0

== Awards and honors ==
- Tracy McGrady – All-NBA 1st Team, All-Star

== Transactions ==
Players Added

Via draft

- Steven Hunter
- Jeryl Sasser
- Omar Cook

Via free agency

- Patrick Ewing
- Horace Grant
- Todd Fuller
- Jaren Jackson

Via trade

- Brendan Haywood
- Laron Profit
- Jud Buechler
Players Lost

Via trade

- Omar Cook
- Michael Doleac
- Brendan Haywood
- Bo Outlaw

Waived

- Todd Fuller

Released

- Dee Brown

=== Trades ===
June 27, 2001	To Orlando Magic Future first round draft pick	To Denver Nuggets Omar Cook
June 27, 2001	To Orlando Magic Brendan Haywood	To Cleveland Cavaliers Michael Doleac
August 1, 2001	To Orlando Magic Laron Profit; 2005 first round draft pick (Julius Hodge)	To Washington Wizards Brendan Haywood
November 16, 2001	To Orlando Magic Jud Buechler	To Phoenix Suns Bo Outlaw; 2002 first round draft pick (Amar'e Stoudemire)

=== Free agents ===
Additions
Player	Date signed	Former team
Patrick Ewing	July 18	Seattle SuperSonics
Horace Grant	July 19	Los Angeles Lakers
Todd Fuller	October 19	Miami Heat
Jaren Jackson	April 2	San Antonio Spurs

Player Transactions Citation:
