= 1 Life 2 Live =

American hip hop group

- Genres: Rap, hip hop
- Years active: 1997–2000
- Labels: ByStorm Entertainment, LaFace
- Members: Red Handed; Babe Blue; Rambo

1 Life 2 Live was an American hip hop group, which comprised musicians Red Handed, Babe Blue and Rambo, that became well noted in the late 1990s for their debut single "Can't Nobody" with Timbaland.

== Career beginnings ==
In 1995, in Bronx, NY, Juan "Red Handed" Cordova produced Doug E. Fresh's "Take 'Em Uptown", which caught the attention of Kid Capri. Capri's affiliates went on to feature Red Handed in various DJing gigs, and later accumulated the attention of next-door neighbor John "Rambo" Arias, who had aspirations of becoming a rapper. The pair formed a friendship and later befriended neighbor Tanya "Babe Blue" Garcia, who also happened to be an aspiring rapper. In 1997, the trio formed as a musical group and recorded two tracks for DJ LS One's mixtape, Shut Em Down. The same year, the group was picked up by Foxy Brown to tour with her in various concert venues both in the United States and Japan. Around this time, the trio performed on Showtime at the Apollo.

== Can't Nobody and debut album (1998–2000) ==
In 1998, the group signed to LaFace Records and made their debut appearance on Timbaland's Tim's Bio: Life from da Bassment on the track "Can't Nobody". The same year, the group began recording material for their self-titled debut album; however, complications stemming from features to production, resulted in multiple delays and eventual shelving. One of the complications included the trio not wanting guest appearances on the project; former manager Mark Pitts suggested a stand-out feature that the group admired. Eminem was initially penned as the sole feature, however after complaints of "expensive label fees", the group instead enlisted Ja Rule, Black Rob and Nature as features on their track "Sacrifice". Additional reports later surfaced and revealed that other guest appearances for the album were slated to include Too Short, CeeLo Green and Khujo of Goodie Mob.

More conflicts later developed over the trio's pick for a lead single. The group's label felt their choice for the Timbaland-produced "Keep Movin'" as a single would underperform since the group were already known in mainstream markets for their debut single ("Can't Nobody") with Timbaland, and urged the group to follow with a different sound. Another single, "Never Fall in Love with Hoes", was issued as an accompanying release, however neither single managed to chart. In the midst of the conflicts, 1 Life 2 Live was featured on the soundtrack to the Will Smith film Wild Wild West (1999), on the Teddy Riley-produced "The Best". Despite the soundtrack appearance, 1 Life 2 Live's debut album was eventually shelved after further complications stemming from L.A. Reid's departure from LaFace to succeed Clive Davis as chairman of Arista Records. In 2000, the group made their final appearance on Madd Rapper's debut album, Tell 'Em Why U Madd, on the tracks "Esta Loca" and "Shysty Broads".

== Dissolution ==
Shortly after the group disbanded, Red Handed was shuffled back to Foxy Brown's camp and joined the short-lived collective Fox-5 with fellow rappers Curtains, Young Mouse, Gavin & Foxy herself. Red Handed would go on to co-write the bulk of Foxy Brown's Broken Silence (2001), and the unreleased effort, Ill Na Na 2: The Fever (2003). Thereafter, Red Handed went on to reside in Oklahoma City and returned to his previous profession, deejaying. Babe Blue went on to sign to Lil' Kim's label Queen Bee Entertainment in 2000; however after her 2-year contract expired, she left the music business after broken promises of recording new material and a failed reunion with former collaborator Timbaland. Rambo quietly resides in Boston, Massachusetts and still creates music. His most recent single "Bring It" has been generating a buzz.

== Discography ==
=== Singles ===
Title	Year	Peak chart positions		Album
Title	Year	US 100	US R&B	Album
"Can't Nobody" (featuring Timbaland)	1998	—	81	Tim's Bio: Life from da Bassment
"Keep Movin'" (featuring Timbaland)	1999	—	—	1 Life 2 Live
"Never Fall in Love with Hoes"	1999	—	—	1 Life 2 Live
