= Cheers 2 U (song) =

Single by Playa

from the album Cheers 2 U
- Released: March 10, 1998
- Recorded: January 1998 (New York City)
- Genre: R&B
- Length: 5:11 (original); 4:06 (radio version)
- Label: Def Jam
- Songwriters: Benjamin Bush; Stephen Garrett; Timothy Mosley
- Producer: Timbaland

Playa singles chronology
"I Gotta Know" (1997)	"Cheers 2 U" (1998)	"All the Way" (1998)

"Cheers 2 U" is a song by American R&B group Playa, that was recorded for their debut studio album of the same name (1998). The song was released as the album's second single in March 1998.

== Track listing ==
CD

1. "Cheers 2 U" (LP Version)
2. "Cheers 2 U" (Instrumental)

== Personnel ==
Information taken from Discogs.

- mixing – Jimmy Douglas, Timbaland
- production – Timbaland
- writing – Stephen "Static" Garrett, Tim Mosley

== Chart performance ==
Chart (1998)	Peak position
U.S. Billboard Hot 100	38
U.S. Hot R&B/Hip-Hop Singles & Tracks	10
