= The World Needs More Skillz =

Studio album by Skillz
- Released: October 25, 2010
- Recorded: The Hampton Studios, K1 Laboratories, Mercy Sound Studios, Evolution Music Group Studios, Harley's House Of Hits, Big Kidz Studios, Sound H Studios
- Genre: Hip Hop
- Length: 49:33
- Label: Big Kidz Entertainment, E1 Music
- Producer: Carvin & Ivan, Kwamé, Sound H, Damien "Des" DeSandies, Joseph "Knoq Harda" Wright, Harley, Veterano, Fusion Unlimited, Rik Marvel, Skillz

Skillz chronology
The Million Dollar Backpack (2008)	The World Needs More Skillz (2010)	Thoughts Become Things (2012)

The World Needs More Skillz is a 2010 album by rapper Skillz. The track "Adam" is a dedication song to DJ AM that was recorded shortly after his death.

== Track listing ==
1. Celebrate Life (feat. Travis Barker) (D. Lewis, I. Barias) (3:28)
2. Regular Guy (D. Lewis, K. Holland) (4:01)
3. Wants and Needs (feat. Bilal) (D. Lewis, I. Barias, C. Haggins, B. Oliver) (3:22)
4. Call Me Crazy (feat. Raheem DeVaughn) (D. Lewis, J. Scott) (3:59)
5. Superbad (D. Lewis, D. DeSandies, M. Youssef) (3:42)
6. Enjoying the View (feat. Joe Tann) (D. Lewis, J. Wright, J. McMinn) (3:22)
7. The World Needs More Skillz (I Gotchu) (D. Lewis, Q. Johnson) (3:11)
8. Flash of Genius (D. Lewis, E. Osborne, T.S. Myrie, D. Grant) (3:36)
9. Going Up (D. Lewis, R. Baker) (4:52)
10. R.N.I.T.R. (D. Lewis, T. Tellington) (3:42)
11. Good Money (D. Lewis, R. Baker) (3:52)
12. Adam (D. Lewis, R. Moore) (4:23)
13. Still Standing (D. Lewis, J. Bibbs, R. Baker, D. Scott) (4:25)

== Personnel ==
- Johnnie "Smurf" Smith: additional piano
- Curt Broadie: bass
- Shaliek, Coco Sarai, Be Bop, Bear Witnez, Daisy Grant, Sean Faylon, Jon Bibbs: additional vocals
- Ivan "Orthodox" Barias, Kwame, A Kid Named Cus, Dustin Baker, Skillz, Ray Baker: recording engineers
- A Kid Named Cus: mixing

Professional ratings
Review scores
Source	Rating
The Smoking Section	3/5 stars
