= I Like Control =

Single by DJ Clue featuring Missy Elliott, Nicole Wray and Mocha

from the album The Professional
- Released: February 13, 1999
- Recorded: 1998
- Genre: Hip-hop; R&B
- Length: 3:48
- Label: Roc-A-Fella; Def Jam
- Songwriters: Ernesto Shaw; Melissa Elliott; Aleesha Richards; Kenneth Ifill; El DeBarge; Bunny DeBarge; Randy DeBarge; Howard Thompson
- Producers: DJ Clue; Ken "Duro" Ifill

DJ Clue singles chronology
"It's On" (1998)	"I Like Control" (1999)	"Ruff Ryders' Anthem" (remix) (1999)

Missy Elliott singles chronology
"Here We Come" (1998)	"I Like Control" (1999)	"She's a Bitch" (1999)

Nicole Wray singles chronology
"I Can't See" (1998)	"I Like Control" (1999)	"Eyes Better Not Wander" (1999)

Mocha singles chronology
"I Can't See" (1998)	"I Like Control" (1999)	"Even Cheaper" (Cheapskate remix) (1999)

Audio video
- "I Like Control" on YouTube

"I Like Control" is a song by DJ Clue? featuring Missy "Misdemeanor" Elliott and her former protégées Nicole Wray and Mocha. The song was released to radio airplay on February 13, 1999, as the second single from Clue's solo debut studio album, The Professional (1998). The song peaked at No. 81 on the Billboard Hot R&B/Hip-Hop Songs chart.

== Charts ==
Chart (1999)	Peak position
US Hot R&B/Hip-Hop Songs (Billboard)	81
US Hot R&B/Hip-Hop Airplay (Billboard)	69
