= Here We Come (song) =

Single by Timbaland featuring Missy Elliott and Magoo

from the album Tim's Bio: Life from da Bassment
- Released: November 17, 1998
- Genre: Hip-hop
- Length: 4:21 (album version)
- Label: Blackground; Atlantic; Virgin
- Songwriters: Timothy Mosley; Melvin Barcliff; Melissa Elliott; Robert Harris; Paul Francis Webster
- Producer: Timbaland

Timbaland singles chronology
"Get on the Bus" (1998)	"Here We Come" (1998)	"Lobster & Scrimp" (1999)

Missy Elliott singles chronology
"Trippin'" (1998)	"Here We Come" (1998)	"I Like Control" (1999)

Magoo singles chronology
"Beep Me 911" (1998)	"Here We Come" (1998)

Visualizer video
- "Here We Come" on YouTube

"Here We Come" is a song by American producer and rapper Timbaland. It features frequent collaborators Missy Elliott and Magoo and serves as the lead single for Timbaland's solo debut album, Tim's Bio: Life from da Bassment (1998). The song also features background vocals by Playa and Darryl Pearson. While the song charted and was released via radio airplay on November 17, 1998, it was not granted a physical release in the United States until March 2, 1999; and on October 5, 1999, for Germany.

Here We Come interpolates the melody from the theme song of the 1967 Spider-Man TV series, written by Paul Francis Webster, with music composed by J. Robert Harris.

== Music video ==
The music video premiered on MTV2 in mid-October 1998. Like the song's concept and interpolation, the video follows a synopsis loosely based on the early Spider-Man comic series. The latter of the video features cameo appearances by Missy Elliott's close friends Ginuwine and Aaliyah. The video was directed by Francis Lawrence.

== Track listings and formats ==
European CD single

1. "Here We Come" (featuring Playa, Magoo & Missy "Misdemeanor" Elliott) — 4:36
2. "Talking Trash" (featuring Bassey) — 4:37

UK 12" vinyl

1. "Here We Come" (featuring Playa, Magoo & Missy "Misdemeanor" Elliott) — 4:36
2. "Talking Trash" (featuring Bassey) — 4:37
3. "I Get It On" (featuring Bassey & Lil' Man) — 4:45

UK CD single

1. "Here We Come" (featuring Playa, Magoo & Missy "Misdemeanor" Elliott) — 4:36

US 12" vinyl

1. "Here We Come" (Album Version) — 4:38
2. "Here We Come" (Instrumental) — 4:38
3. "Here We Come" (Acapella) — 4:06
4. "DJ Timmy Tim's BC Mix" — 9:46
5. "Here We Come" (Radio Version) — 4:37

== Charts ==
Chart (1998)	Peak position
Netherlands (Mega Single Top 100)	33
UK Singles Chart	43
US Billboard Hot 100	92
US Billboard Hot R&B/Hip-Hop Singles & Tracks	54
US Billboard Rhythmic Top 40	32

== Release history ==
Region	Date	Format
United States	November 17, 1998	Radio airplay
United Kingdom	February 15, 1999	CD single
United States	March 2, 1999	CD single
Germany	October 5, 1999	CD single
