= Thoughts Become Things =

Studio album by Skillz
- Released: December 24, 2012
- Recorded: 2011–2012
- Genre: Hip hop
- Length: 46:56
- Label: Big Kidz Entertainment, Empire
- Producer: PC, Veterano, Andrew Hypes, Rik Marvel, Skillz, Sound H, District 9, G Mo Beats

Skillz chronology
The World Needs More Skillz (2010)	Thoughts Become Things (2012)	Made in Virginia (2014)

Thoughts Become Things is the sixth studio album by American rapper Skillz. It was released on December 24, 2012. The album features guest appearances from Joe Tann, Cam Wallace, E. Penn, Carmael, Planet 6 and Ayah.

== Track listing ==
No.	Title	Producer(s)	Length
1.	"(Intro) Hard to Be Me"	PC	3:56
2.	"So High"	Veterano	3:16
3.	"Bring the Sparklers Out"	Andrew Hypes	2:51
4.	"Love n Hip Hop" (featuring Joe Tann)		3:47
5.	"Ignorant Levels"	Rik Marvel	3:28
6.	"Maybe I Dont Know Her at All"		3:06
7.	"Y.A.R.D.T.S" (featuring Cam Wallace)	Veterano	3:25
8.	"With You" (featuring E. Penn)	Skillz, Sound H	3:47
9.	"Tryin' to Get by" (featuring Carmael)	District 9	3:37
10.	"Zero F's" (featuring Planet 6)	Rik Marvel	3:07
11.	"I'm Outchea"		3:57
12.	"Thoughts Become Things" (featuring Ayah)	G Mo Beats	3:56
13.	"2012 Rap up"	District 9	4:43
