= From Where??? =

Studio album by Mad Skillz
- Released: February 13, 1996
- Recorded: 1994–95
- Studios: Battery Studios; Unique Recording Studios; Quad Studios; Soundtrack Studios (New York City)
- Genre: Hip hop
- Length: 1:01:48
- Labels: Big Beat; Atlantic
- Producers: Buckwild; DJ Clark Kent; EZ Elpee; Jay Dee; Large Professor; Mad Skillz; Nick Wiz; Shawn J Period; The Beatnuts

Mad Skillz chronology
From Where??? (1996)	I Ain't Mad No More (2002)

Singles from From Where???
- 1. "The Nod Factor" Released: 1995; 2. "Move Ya Body" Released: 1996; 3. "Extra Abstract Skillz" Released: 1996

Professional ratings
Review scores
Source	Rating
AllMusic	4/5 stars
Los Angeles Times	3/4 stars
Muzik	4/5 stars
RapReviews	7/10
The Source	3.5/5 stars

From Where??? is the debut studio album by American hip hop artist Mad Skillz. It was released on February 13, 1996, via Big Beat/Atlantic Records. Originally scheduled for a September 5, 1995 release. Recording sessions took place at Battery Studios, Unique Recording Studios, Quad Studios and Soundtrack Studios in New York City. Production was handled by Mad Skillz, Buckwild, Shawn J. Period, J Dilla, DJ Clark Kent, EZ Elpee, Large Professor, Nick Wiz, and the Beatnuts, with Rob "Reef" Tewlow serving as executive producer. It features guest appearances from Kalonji the Immortal, Dr. Mindbenda, Javon the Medieval, Large Professor, Lil' Roc, Lonnie B and Q-Tip. The album peaked at number 154 on the Billboard 200, number 18 on the Top R&B/Hip-Hop Albums and number 5 on the Heatseekers Albums chart in the United States.

The album was praised for its strong lyrical content and production, however, suffered from low sales, possibly due to being released the same day as 2Pac's All Eyez on Me and the Fugees's The Score. The singles "The Nod Factor" and "Move Ya Body" received moderate radio and video airplay.

== Track listing ==
No.	Title	Writer(s)	Producer(s)	Length
1.	"From Where??? (Intro)"		Mad Skillz	1:21
2.	"It's Goin' Down"	Donnie Lewis; James Yancey	Jay Dee	4:02
3.	"The Nod Factor"	Lewis; Lester Fernandez; John Watson; Harry Reynolds	The Beatnuts	3:58
4.	"VA. In the House"	Lewis; Anthony Best	Buckwild	4:33
5.	"Tongues of the Next Shit" (featuring Kalonji The Immortal)	Lewis; Kalonji Coleman	Mad Skillz	4:22
6.	"Doin' Time In the Cypha"	Lewis; Best; William Allen; Roy Ayers; Philip Woo	Buckwild	4:15
7.	"Tip of the Tongue"	Lewis; Nick Loizides	Nick Wiz	3:51
8.	"Extra Abstract Skillz" (featuring Large Professor and Q-Tip)	Lewis; William Paul Mitchell; Jonathan Davis	Large Professor	3:14
9.	"WMAD (Interlude)"			1:08
10.	"Get Your Groove On"	Lewis; Best	Buckwild	4:42
11.	"The Jam"	Lewis; Yancey	Jay Dee	4:18
12.	"Move Ya Body"	Lewis; Rodolfo Franklin; Jeffrey Osborne; Barry Eastmond	DJ Clark Kent	3:58
13.	"Street Rules"	Lewis; Shawn M. Jones	Shawn J Period	4:28
14.	"All In It"	Lewis; Jones	Shawn J Period	4:26
15.	"Unseen World" (featuring Lonnie B, Kalonji The Immortal, Dr. Mindbenda, Lil' Roc and Javon The Medieval)	Lewis; Lonnie Battle; Coleman; D. Barbour; Ahmed Rahman; J. West; Lamont Porter	EZ Elpee	4:51
16.	"Inherit the World"	Lewis; Jones	Shawn J Period	4:21
Total length:				1:01:48

Sample credits

- Track 3 contains elements from "Superman Lover" performed by Johnny "Guitar" Watson
- Track 12 contains elements from "Only Human" performed by Jeffrey Osborne

== Personnel ==
- Donnie "Mad Skillz" Lewis – vocals (tracks: 2–16), producer (tracks: 1, 5), mixing (tracks: 1–11, 13–16)
- Kalonji Coleman – vocals (tracks: 5, 15)
- Jonathan "Q-Tip" Davis – vocals (track 8)
- Lonnie Battle – vocals (track 15)
- Dr. Mindbenda – vocals (track 15)
- Ahmed "Lil' Roc" Rahman – vocals (track 15)
- Javon The Medieval – vocals (track 15)
- Anthony "Roc Raida" Williams – scratches (track 2)
- Lester "Psycho Les" Fernandez – scratches & producer (track 3)
- Diallo Malbrough Moss – horns programming (track 5)
- Andrew Smith – keyboard bass (track 7)
- Joseph "DJ Riz" Rizzo – scratches (tracks: 14, 16)
- James "J Dilla" Yancey – producer & mixing (tracks: 2, 11)
- Anthony "Buckwild" Best – producer & mixing (tracks: 4, 6, 10)
- Nicholas "Nick Wiz" Loizides – producer & mixing (track 7)
- William "Large Professor" Mitchell – producer & mixing (track 8)
- Rodolfo "DJ Clark Kent" Franklin – producer & mixing (track 12)
- Shawn M. Jones – producer & mixing (tracks: 13, 14, 16)
- Lamont "Ez Elpee" Porter – producer & mixing (track 15)
- Rob "Reef" Tewlow – executive producer, A&R
- Tony Smalios – recording (tracks: 1, 2, 5, 10, 11, 13, 15), mixing (tracks: 1–3, 5, 7, 11, 13, 15)
- George Karras – recording (tracks: 3, 4, 7)
- Rich July – recording (tracks: 6, 14, 16), mixing (tracks: 14, 16)
- Troy Hightower – recording & mixing (track 8)
- Kenny Ortiz – recording & mixing (track 12)
- Tim Latham – mixing (tracks: 4, 6, 10)
- Tom Coyne – mastering
- Daniel Hastings – design, photography
- Miguel Rivera – design, photography
- Christian Cortes – design
- Glenn Orenstein – production coordinator

== Charts ==
Chart (1996)	Peak position
US Billboard 200	154
US Top R&B/Hip-Hop Albums (Billboard)	18
US Top Heatseekers (Billboard)	5

Singles chart positions

Year	Song	Chart positions			
Year	Song	Billboard Hot 100	Hot R&B/Hip-Hop Singles & Tracks	Hot Rap Singles	Hot Dance Music/Maxi-Singles Sales
1995	"The Nod Factor"	—	#76	#26	#16
1996	"Move Ya Body"	—	#85	#27	#8
