= The Million Dollar Backpack =

Studio album by Skillz
- Released: July 22, 2008
- Recorded: 2006–08
- Studio: Homecookin Studios (Philadelphia, PA); Portside Sound; Donland Studios; Chung King Studios (New York, NY); K1 Laboratories; The House That Quest Built; Larry Gold's The Studio (Philadelphia, PA); The Boom Room (Philadelphia, PA)
- Genre: Hip hop
- Length: 52:53
- Label: Big Kidz Music; Koch Records
- Producer: Bink!; Carvin & Ivan; DJ Jazzy Jeff; Fusion Unlimited; Jake One; James Poyser; Jimmy "Slim" Rose; Khari Ferrari; Kwamé; Questlove; Skillz; Usef Dinero

Skillz chronology
Confessions of a Ghostwriter (2005)	The Million Dollar Backpack (2008)	The World Needs More Skillz (2010)

Professional ratings
Review scores
Source	Rating
HipHopDX	3.5/5
PopMatters	7/10
RapReviews	8.5/10

The Million Dollar Backpack is the fourth solo studio album by American rapper and record producer Skillz. It was released on July 22, 2008, via Big Kidz Music and Koch Records. Recording sessions took place at Homecookin Studios, Larry Gold's The Studio and The Boom Room in Philadelphia, at Portside Sound, at Donland Studios, at Chung King Studios in New York, at K1 Laboratories, at The House That Quest Built. Production was handled by Bink!, Fusion Unlimited, Khari Ferrari, Carvin & Ivan, DJ Jazzy Jeff, Jake One, James Poyser, Jimmy "Slim" Rose, Kwamé, ?uestlove, Usef Dinero, and Skillz himself. It features guest appearances from Black Thought, Common and Freeway.

The first single off the album was "So Far So Good" featuring Common on the album version and Talib Kweli on the video version. It is the follow-up to Skillz 2005 album Confessions of a Ghostwriter.

== Track listing ==
No.	Title	Writer(s)	Producer(s)	Length
1.	"The Million Dollar Backpack (Intro)"	Donnie Lewis; Jeff Townes; Johnnie Smith	DJ Jazzy Jeff; Johnnie 'Smurf' Smith (co.)	2:38
2.	"Where I Been"	Lewis; Duane Fowlkes; Jacob Dutton	Jake One	3:39
3.	"Don't Act Like You Don't Know" (featuring Freeway)	Lewis; Leslie Pridgen; Carvin Haggins; Ivan Barias	Carvin & Ivan	3:38
4.	"So Far So Good" (featuring Common)	Lewis; Lonnie Lynn; Joseph Pritchard	Usef Dinero	4:06
5.	"Sick"	Lewis; Kwamé Holland	Kwamé	3:05
6.	"(For Real) He Don't Owe Me"	Lewis; Kristal Oliver; Roosevelt Harrell III	Bink!	3:21
7.	"My Phone"	Lewis; Tyrone Tellington; Leonard Stephens	Fusion Unlimited; E-Flat (co.)	4:37
8.	"Yeah Ya Know It"	Lewis; Khari Mateen; Karl Jenkins	Khari Ferrari; Skillz (co.)	3:50
9.	"Hold Tight" (featuring Black Thought)	Lewis; Tariq Trotter; Ahmir Thompson	?uestlove; James Poyser	4:05
10.	"Crazy World"	Lewis; Mateen; Jenkins	Khari Ferrari; Skillz	3:25
11.	"I'm Gon Make It"	Lewis; Durrell Scott; Harrell III	Bink!	3:31
12.	"Be Alright"	Lewis; Tellington; Stephens	Fusion Unlimited; E-Flat (co.)	4:10
13.	"Hip Hop Died"	Lewis; Mateen; Jenkins	Khari Ferrari; Skillz (co.); Dice Raw (voc.)	4:51
14.	"Preachin to the Choir"	Lewis; Jimmy Rose	Jimmy "Slim" Rose	3:57
Total length:				52:53

== Personnel ==
- Donnie "Mad Skillz" Lewis – vocals, producer & recording (track 10), co-producer (tracks: 8, 13), executive producer
- Duane Fowlkes – additional vocals (track 2)
- Leslie "Freeway" Pridgen – rap vocals (track 3)
- Lonnie "Common" Lynn – rap vocals (track 4)
- Kwamé "K1 Mil" Holland – additional vocals & producer (track 5)
- Jamal "Truck North" Miller – additional vocals (track 8)
- Tariq "Black Thought" Trotter – rap vocals (track 9)
- Maimouna Youssef – additional vocals (track 10)
- Durrell "Bishop" Scott – vocals (track 11)
- Kenny Wray – vocals (track 11)
- Aaries – vocals (track 12)
- Cornbread – vocals (track 12)
- Maurice "DJ Aktive" Deloach – scratches (track 4)
- Leonard "E-Flat" Stephens – guitar (track 7), co-producer (tracks: 7, 12)
- James Poyser – keyboards (track 13), producer (track 9)
- Jeffrey "DJ Jazzy Jeff" Townes – producer & recording (track 1)
- Jacob "Jake One" Dutton – producer (track 2)
- Carvin "Ransum" Haggins – producer (track 3), recording (track 4), co-executive producer
- Ivan "Orthodox" Barias – producer (track 3), mixing (tracks: 1–4, 6, 7, 12), recording (tracks: 2–4, ), co-executive producer
- Joseph "Usef Dinero"/"Joe Money" Pritchard – producer (track 4)
- Roosevelt "Bink!" Harrell III – producer (tracks: 6, 11)
- Tyrone D. Tellington – producer (tracks: 7, 12)
- Khari Abdul Mateen – producer & recording (tracks: 8, 10, 13)
- Ahmir "?uestlove" Thompson – producer (track 9)
- Jimmy "Slim" Rose – producer & recording (track 14)
- Johnnie "Smurf" Smith – co-producer (track 1)
- Karl "Dice Raw" Jenkins – vocal producer (track 13), co-executive producer
- Andre Dandridge – recording (tracks: 1, 7, 12)
- Gary Herd – recording (tracks: 2, 6, 9, 11)
- Chris "Tek" O'Ryan – mixing (track 4), recording (track 11)
- A Kid Called Cus – recording & mixing (track 5)
- Kristal Oliver – recording (track 6)
- Jon Smeltz – mixing (tracks: 8–10, 13, 14)
- Steven Mandel – recording (track 9)
- Montez Roberts – recording (track 9)
- Jerome Hipps – executive producer
- Michael McArthur – executive producer
- Mahfuzur "Shomi" Patwary – design, layout
- Paul Grosso – design
- Laurel Dann – A&R
