= Crew Deep =

Single by Skillz featuring Missy Elliott and Kandi

from the album I Ain't Mad No More and Soundbombing III
- Released: August 20, 2002
- Genre: Hip hop
- Label: MCA; Rawkus
- Songwriters: B. Collins; B. H. Edwards; D. Richard Lewis; G. Clinton; T. Mosley; M. Elliott; K. Burruss
- Producer: Hi-Tek

Skillz singles chronology
"Y'all Don't Wanna" (2001)	"Crew Deep" (2002)	"Off the Wall" (2003)

Missy Elliott singles chronology
"4 My People" (2002)	"Crew Deep" (2002)	"Work It" (2002)

Kandi singles chronology
"Cheatin' on Me" (2001)	"Crew Deep" (2002)	"U and Dat" (2006)

Alternative cover

"Crew Deep" is a single by American rapper Skillz. The song features guest vocals by rapper–singer Missy Elliott and former Xscape member Kandi. It was released as the lead single from Skillz's unreleased album, I Ain't Mad No More (2002).

Two versions of the single saw conflicting releases. One version was released as the music video and single version with the chorus being performed entirely by Kandi while sampled additional vocals were performed by Missy Elliott in the latter. An alternate version was released promotionally with the exclusion of Kandi's vocals and the extension of Missy Elliott performing the chorus entirely by herself; this version was also incorporated into "The V.A. Remix" featuring Elliott, Clipse and Pharrell Williams.

== Release ==
Physical copies of the single were released on August 20, 2002. As the song obtained buzz, it was later featured on various compilations among the likes of Tony Touch's Hip Hop #71: True Gangsta and Soundbombing, Vol. 3 to further strengthen the song's charting performance.

== Music video ==
A music video for the single was directed by The Malloys and premiered on BET in early July 2002. The video takes place at Skillz's neighborhood house party. Inside the house, there are talking taxidermies of various types of rappers (white rappers, male rappers, female rappers, etc.) that all sing along to the chorus of the song. Although Kandi and Missy Elliott were not featured in the video, the various women and talking taxidermies in the video are seen lip-syncing their parts.

== Track listings and formats ==
CD single

1. "Crew Deep" (Clean) — 3:25
2. "Crew Deep" (Instrumental) — 3:25
3. "Crew Deep" (Dirty) — 3:25

"The V.A. Remix" (Vinyl)

1. "Crew Deep" (featuring Clipse, Missy Elliott & Pharrell)
2. "Crew Deep" (featuring Missy Elliott & Pharrell)

12" Vinyl

1. "Crew Deep" (Dirty) — 3:25
2. "Crew Deep" (Clean) — 3:25
3. "Crew Deep" (Instrumental) — 3:25
4. "Imagine" (Dirty) — 3:38
5. "Imagine" (Clean) — 3:38
6. "Imagine" (Instrumental) — 3:36
7. "Imagine" (Acappella) — 3:36

== Chart performance ==
Chart (2002)	Peak position
US Billboard Hot 100 Singles Sales	41
US Billboard Hot R&B/Hip-Hop Singles Sales	15
US Billboard Hot R&B/Hip-Hop Songs	83
