= Under Construction, Part II =

Under Construction Part II

Studio album by Timbaland & Magoo
- Released: November 18, 2003
- Length: 62:49
- Labels: Blackground; Universal
- Producers: Heavy D; J Nitti; Timbaland

Timbaland & Magoo chronology
Indecent Proposal (2001)	Under Construction Part II (2003)

Timbaland chronology
Indecent Proposal (2001)	Under Construction Part II (2003)	Shock Value (2007)

Under Construction, Part II is the third and final studio album released by hip hop duo Timbaland & Magoo. It was released by Blackground and Universal on November 18, 2003, in the United States. The group's third album and Timbaland's fourth overall LP, as he issued Tim's Bio: Life from da Bassment, a solo album, in 1998, Under Construction Part II is nominally a sequel to Missy Elliott's fourth studio album Under Construction, which was also chiefly produced by Timbaland. The album was dedicated to R&B singer and regular Timbaland collaborator Aaliyah, who had died on August 25, 2001.

Elliott appears on the album's lead single, "Cop That Shit. Many other guest stars, from Brandy to Sebastian, Bubba Sparxxx, Wyclef Jean and Beenie Man, also appear on the album. Three singles were released from Under Construction, Part II: "Cop That Shit", "Indian Flute", and the promotional single "Naughty Eye". In August 2021, Blackground rebranded as Blackground 2.0, with Barry Hankerson remaining as founder. Blackground 2.0 signed a distribution deal with Empire Distribution, which will re-release the label's catalogue onto digital download sites and streaming services. Under Construction, Part II was rereleased on August 27, 2021. This was the last album by Magoo before his death in August 2023.

== Critical reception ==
Professional ratings
Review scores
Source	Rating
AllMusic	3/5 stars
Blender	4/5 stars
Robert Christgau	A−
The Independent	2/4 stars
New York Post	2.5/4 stars
Rolling Stone	2/5 stars

AllMusic editor John Bush found that "there aren't quite enough guest features or catchy hooks to make this a must-purchase for most rap fans, but Timbaland always has a few tricks up his sleeve." He remarked that "aside from Missy and Bubba Sparxxx, Timba's actually the best rapper on display, much improved from his previous solo shots or his infrequent rhymes on other artists' records. Magoo is still an unimaginative, pint-sized Snoop Dogg." Ben Sisario from Blender felt that "for the most part, the grooves ride low and easy, like a next-generation G-funk transplanted to the Virginia coastline: Call it V-funk [...] But Timbaland can't rest that easy, and just beneath the languid surface is effortlessly brilliant innovation in every direction."

Robert Christgau wrote: "Good thing the two rappers have less personality combined than any of their 10-cameo-artists-in-16-tracks, because personality would distract from the beats, which with Timbo means what it says – no mainstream DJ relies so heavily on rhythm instruments per se. His sweetener of choice is chants." Dan Aquilante of the New York Post found the album listenable, highlighting Timbaland's production and guest appearances from Missy Elliott, Bubba Sparxxx and Wyclef Jean, though he criticized the album's repetitive 19-track length. In a negative review, Rolling Stone's Jon Caramanica called Under Construction, Part II the "duo's third and weakest collaborative album." He remarked that "Tim's normally dazzling beats dodder along harmlessly, proof that he's looking over his shoulder when he should be hunching over his studio equipment."

== Track listing ==
No.	Title	Writer(s)	Producer(s)	Length
1.	"Straight Outta Virginia (Intro)"	Timothy Mosley	Timbaland	2:03
2.	"Cop That Shit" (featuring Missy Elliott)	T. Mosley; Melvin Barcliff; Elliott; Dennis Taylor; Edward Archer; Eric Barrier; Freddie Byrd; Howie Thompson; Jack Hill; Jackey Beavers; Lael Williams; Lana Moorer; Preston Joyner; William Griffin	Timbaland	3:33
3.	"Shenanigans" (featuring Bubba Sparxxx)	T. Mosley; Barcliff; Williams; Warren Mathis	Timbaland	3:46
4.	"Leavin'" (featuring Attitude)	T. Mosley; Barcliff; Timothy Clayton	Timbaland	3:35
5.	"That Shit Ain't Gonna Work"	T. Mosley; Barcliff; Clayton	Timbaland	3:58
6.	"Don't Make Me Take It There" (featuring Frank Lee White)	T. Mosley; Williams; Jason Nitti; Brandon McMichael	J Nitti	4:26
7.	"Indian Flute" (featuring Sebastian and Rajé Shwari)	T. Mosley; Barcliff; Garland Mosley; Shwari	Timbaland	3:21
8.	"Can We Do It Again"	T. Mosley; Barcliff; Clayton	Timbaland	3:52
9.	"Naughty Eye" (featuring Sebastian and Rajé Shwari)	T. Mosley; Barcliff; G. Mosley; Shwari	Timbaland	4:55
10.	"N 2 Da Music" (featuring Brandy)	T. Mosley; Barcliff; Clayton	Timbaland	3:57
11.	"Hold On" (featuring Wyclef Jean)	T. Mosley; Barcliff; Clayton; Jean	Timbaland	5:04
12.	"Insane" (featuring Candice "Gg" Nelson)	T. Mosley; Barcliff; G. Mosley; Walter Millsap III	Timbaland	4:31
13.	"Throwback"	T. Mosley; Barcliff; G. Mosley; Dennis Coffey; Dwayne Simon; James Smith; Williams	Timbaland	3:45
14.	"Kold Kutz"	T. Mosley; Barcliff; G. Mosley	Timbaland	4:23
15.	"I Got Luv 4 Ya"	T. Mosley; Barcliff; G. Mosley; Dwight Myers	Heavy D	4:07
16.	"Naughty Eye II (Hips)" (featuring Beenie Man)	T. Mosley; Barcliff; Moses Davis; Shwari	Timbaland	3:32
Total length:				62:49

Sample credits

- "Cop That Shit" contains re-sung elements from "I Know You Got Soul," written by E. Barrier and W. Griffin, and "Paper Thin," as written by L. Moorer and F. Byrd.
- "Indian Flute" contains an uncredited sample of "Curura" by Toto la Momposina.
- "Hold On" contains an uncredited sample of "Breaking Glass" by Geri Halliwell.

== Charts ==
Chart (2003–2004)	Peak position
Canadian R&B Albums (Nielsen SoundScan)	26
French Albums (SNEP)	108
German Albums (Offizielle Top 100)	75
UK Independent Albums (Official Charts)	22
US Billboard 200	50
US Top R&B/Hip-Hop Albums (Billboard)	16
