= Troy Hudson =

American basketball player (born 1976)

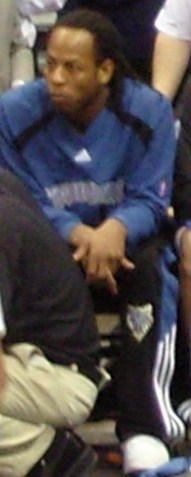
- Hudson with the Minnesota Timberwolves in 2007

Personal information
- Born: March 13, 1976 (age 50) Carbondale, Illinois, U.S.
- Listed height: 6 ft 1 in (1.85 m)
- Listed weight: 170 lb (77 kg)

Career information
- High school: Carbondale Community (Carbondale, Illinois)
- College: Missouri (1994–1995); Southern Illinois (1995–1997)
- NBA draft: 1997: undrafted
- Playing career: 1997–2013
- Position: Point guard
- Number: 25, 6, 11, 16

Career history
- 1997: Utah Jazz
- 1997–1998: Yakima Sun Kings
- 1998–1999: Sioux Falls Skyforce
- 1999–2000: Los Angeles Clippers
- 2000–2002: Orlando Magic
- 2002–2007: Minnesota Timberwolves
- 2007–2008: Golden State Warriors
- 2012–2013: Sioux Falls Skyforce

Career highlights
- Second-team All-MVC (1997); MVC All-Freshman team (1996)
- Stats at NBA.com
- Stats at Basketball Reference

Troy Elderon Hudson (born March 13, 1976) is an American former professional basketball point guard. He played 11 years in the National Basketball Association (NBA) after going undrafted in 1997. He averaged a career-high 14.2 points per game with the Minnesota Timberwolves in the 2002–03 season.

== College career ==
Hudson played basketball at the University of Missouri and Southern Illinois University, but his college career finished in his junior year.

== Professional career ==
=== Utah Jazz (1997) ===
Hudson was not selected in the 1997 NBA draft. Hudson earned a hard-fought spot on the Utah Jazz in 1997, which only lasted two months.

=== Yakima SunKings (1997–1998) ===
Hudson played in the Continental Basketball Association for the Yakima SunKings.

=== Los Angeles Clippers, Sioux Falls Skyforce, and Orlando Magic (1998–2002) ===
Hudson played for the Los Angeles Clippers (also playing during the short-lived 1999 season in the CBA for the Sioux Falls Skyforce) and the Orlando Magic, where he first developed into an important player, averaging 12 points and 3 assists per game during 2001–02, while appearing in 81 games.

=== Minnesota Timberwolves (2002–2007) ===
However, Hudson's most productive seasons came with the Minnesota Timberwolves, where he averaged a career-best 14.2 points and 5.7 assists in 2002–03, also receiving the nickname "Laker Killer" for his outstanding postseason play against the Los Angeles Lakers, where he increased his numbers to 23.5 points in a 2–4 first-round loss.

After landing a lucrative six-year, $36 million contract extension in 2003, Hudson was plagued by nagging injuries that subsequently hurt his production, as he only appeared in 70 games from 2005–06 to 2006–07 combined. His contract with the Timberwolves was bought out on August 3, 2007.

=== Golden State Warriors (2007–2008) ===
Originally signed to the Golden State Warriors on September 24, 2007, Hudson appeared in only nine games in the 2007–08 season. Following hip surgery on January 10, 2008, he was waived by the Warriors on January 29, to make room for Chris Webber, averaging 9.0 points per game throughout his NBA career.

=== Return to Sioux Falls (2012–2013) ===
On October 31, 2012, Hudson signed with the Sioux Falls Skyforce of the NBA D-League. After struggling with injuries, he decided to retire at the end of January 2013.

== Music career ==
Hudson released one major album, Undrafted, also having recorded around 800 songs. A drum machine usually accompanies him on road trips. "I have my own label—Nutty Boyz Entertainment—and I have three artists (that I manage)", he said in an interview. However, the albums were not big sellers, with Hudson only selling 78 copies of his own in its first week of sales.

== NBA career statistics ==
Legend
GP	Games played	GS	Games started	MPG	Minutes per game
FG%	Field goal percentage	3P%	3-point field goal percentage	FT%	Free throw percentage
RPG	Rebounds per game	APG	Assists per game	SPG	Steals per game
BPG	Blocks per game	PPG	Points per game	**Bold**	Career high

=== Regular season ===
Year	Team	GP	GS	MPG	FG%	3P%	FT%	RPG	APG	SPG	BPG	PPG
1997–98	Utah	8	0	2.9	.429	.000	.000	.3	.5	.2	.0	1.5
1998–99	L.A. Clippers	25	6	21.0	.400	.319	.895	2.2	3.7	.4	**.1**	6.8
1999–00	L.A. Clippers	62	38	25.7	.377	.311	.811	**2.4**	3.9	.7	.0	8.8
2000–01	Orlando	75	7	13.4	.336	.202	.817	1.4	2.2	.5	.0	4.8
2001–02	Orlando	**81**	4	22.9	**.434**	.353	.876	1.8	3.1	.7	**.1**	11.7
2002–03	Minnesota	79	**74**	**32.9**	.428	.365	.900	2.3	**5.7**	**.8**	**.1**	**14.2**
2003–04	Minnesota	29	1	17.3	.386	**.403**	.818	1.2	2.4	.2	.0	7.5
2004–05	Minnesota	79	32	21.9	.401	.345	.778	1.3	3.6	.3	**.1**	8.7
2005–06	Minnesota	36	0	22.2	.381	.396	.923	1.2	2.9	.3	**.1**	9.5
2006–07	Minnesota	34	6	16.3	.379	.350	.813	1.4	2.1	.4	**.1**	5.9
2007–08	Golden State	9	0	10.3	.290	.333	**1.000**	.8	1.0	.3	.0	3.1
Career		517	168	21.8	.401	.339	.858	1.7	3.4	.5	.0	9.0

=== Playoffs ===
Year	Team	GP	GS	MPG	FG%	3P%	FT%	RPG	APG	SPG	BPG	PPG
2001	Orlando	4	0	14.0	.286	.000	.833	**2.3**	2.3	.2	.0	4.3
2002	Orlando	4	0	26.5	.375	.000	.938	1.0	1.5	.0	.0	12.8
2003	Minnesota	**6**	**6**	**36.8**	**.415**	**.436**	**.947**	2.0	**5.5**	**1.3**	.0	**23.5**
Career		14	6	27.4	.389	.362	.933	1.8	3.4	.6	.0	14.9
