= All Y'all (song) =

Single by Timbaland & Magoo featuring Tweet and Sebastian

from the album Indecent Proposal
- Released: October 1, 2001
- Recorded: 2000–2001
- Genre: Hip hop, R&B
- Length: 3:57
- Label: Blackground Records/Atlantic Records/Virgin
- Songwriter(s): Melvin "Magoo" Barcliff, Timothy "Timbaland" Mosley, Charlene "Tweet" Keys, Ciro Sebastinelli, Garland "Sebastian" Mosley
- Producer(s): Timbaland

Timbaland & Magoo singles chronology
"Drop" (2001)	"All Y'all" (2001)	"Cop That Disc" (2003)

Tweet singles chronology
"Take Away" (2001)	"All Y'all" (2001)	"Oops (Oh My)" (2002)

Sebastian singles chronology
"We At It Again" (2000)	"All Y'all" (2001)	"Indian Flute" (2003)

"All Y'all" is a song by the American recording duo Timbaland & Magoo. It has accompanying vocals by the R&B singer Tweet and Timbaland's brother Sebastian. The song was the second single released from Timbaland & Magoo's second album, Indecent Proposal (2001).

== Music video ==
A music video for the single was directed by Nick Quested and was released in the week of December 10, 2001. The video follows the song's lyrical concept in a continuous shot, where Timbaland, Magoo, Sebastian and Tweet take turns performing in differing settings while following the camera.

== Track listings and formats ==
European 12" vinyl

1. "All Y'all" (Clean Edit) (featuring Tweet) – 3:57
2. "Drop" (featuring Fatman Scoop) – 6:05
3. "All Y'all" (Instrumental) – 3:57

US 12" vinyl

1. "All Y'all" (Album Version) (featuring Tweet) – 3:57
2. "All Y'all" (Radio Edit) (featuring Tweet) – 3:57
3. "All Y'all" (Instrumental) (featuring Tweet) – 3:57
4. "All Y'all" (Acapella) (featuring Tweet) – 3:57

US CD single

1. "All Y'all" (Album Version) (fedaturing Tweet) – 4:02
2. "All Y'all" (Radio Edit) (featuring Tweet) – 4:02
3. "All Y'all" (Instrumental) – 3:58
4. "All Y'all" (Acapella) (featuring Tweet) – 4:01
5. "All Y'all" (Call Out Hook) – 0:11

== Charts ==
The song debuted on the Billboard Hot R&B/Hip-Hop Singles & Tracks chart at number 77 in the week of November 10, 2001. It peaked at 58 less than three weeks later.

Chart (2001)	Peak position
US Billboard Hot R&B/Hip-Hop Singles & Tracks	58
US Billboard Hot R&B/Hip-Hop Airplay	57

== See also ==
- Timbaland production discography
