= Cop That Shit =

Single by Timbaland & Magoo featuring Missy Elliott

from the album Under Construction, Part II
- Released: September 29, 2003
- Recorded: 2002
- Genre: Hip hop
- Length: 3:36
- Label: Blackground; Atlantic
- Songwriters: Timothy Mosley; Melvin Barcliff; Dennis Taylor; Edward Archer; Eric Barrier; Freddie Byrd; Howie Thompson; Jack Hill; Jackey Beavers; Lael Williams; Lana Moorer; Missy Elliott; Preston Joyner; William Griffin
- Producer: Timbaland

Timbaland & Magoo singles chronology
"All Y'all" (2001)	"Cop That Shit" (2003)	"Indian Flute" (2003)

Missy Elliott singles chronology
"Fighting Temptation" (2003)	"Cop That Shit" (2003)	"Pass That Dutch" (2003)

Music video
- "Cop That Shit" on YouTube

"Cop That Shit", also known in its censored form as "Cop That Disc", is the lead single taken from hip-hop duo Timbaland & Magoo's third studio album, Under Construction, Part II. The track features vocals from Missy Elliott. The single was released on September 29, 2003 in Europe, but was not released in the United Kingdom until March 8, 2004. The hip hop track itself refers to people downloading and burning music instead of buying it. All of the tracks' verses are resung verses from classic rap songs, however some of the lyrics are changed. Timbaland's verse is a rewrite of "I Know You Got Soul" by Eric B. & Rakim, Missy's verse is a rewrite of Paper Thin by MC Lyte, and Magoo's verse is a rewrite of "I Got It Made" by Special Ed.

== Music video ==
The music video for the track shows Timbaland, Missy and Magoo in various city scenes: subway station, neighborhood basketball court, taxi cab and in front of a spraypainted image of themselves. MC Lyte, Rakim and Special Ed appear through the verses that were borrowed from them, also rapper Flavor Flav made a cameo appearance. The video also features a rap interlude by rapper Sebastian from the song "Do Your Thang", and a dance choreography from Mari Koda, who would later star in the dance movie Step Up 3D. A mural of late singer Aaliyah depicted as an angel appears through the whole video.

== Track listing ==
- UK CD1
1. "Cop That Shit" (Clean Radio Edit)
2. "Cop That Shit" (Mentor Remix featuring Juggy D. Dirty)
3. "Drop" (featuring Fatman Scoop)
- UK CD2 - Limited Edition Remix EP
1. "Cop That Shit" (Clean Radio Edit)
2. "Cop That Shit" (Mentor Remix)
3. "Cop That Shit" (Motivo Hi-Lectro Remix)
4. "Cop That Shit" (Limrak Remix)
5. "Cop That Shit" (Finest Remix)
- German CD single
1. "Cop That Shit" (Clean Radio Edit)
2. "Cop That Shit" (Dirty Edit)
3. "Cop That Shit" (Instrumental)
4. "Cop That Shit" (Acappella)
5. "Cop That Shit" (Callout Hook)
6. "Cop That Shit" (Music Video)

== Charts ==
Chart (2003)	Peak position
Australia (ARIA)	34
Netherlands (Single Top 100)	98
New Zealand (Recorded Music NZ)	33
Switzerland (Schweizer Hitparade)	82
UK Singles (Official Charts Company)	22
UK Indie (OCC)	1
UK Hip Hop/R&B (OCC)	4
US Billboard Hot 100	95
US Hot R&B/Hip-Hop Songs (Billboard)	49
