= Static Major =

American singer and rapper (1974–2008)

- Also known as: Static; Static/Major
- Born: Stephen Ellis Garrett, Jr. November 11, 1974; Louisville, Kentucky, U.S.
- Died: February 25, 2008 (aged 33) Louisville, Kentucky, U.S.
- Genres: R&B; Southern hip-hop
- Occupations: Record producer; singer; rapper; songwriter
- Years active: 1990−2008
- Labels: Def Jam; Universal; Blackground
- Formerly of: Playa; Swing Mob
- Spouse: Avonti Garrett (m. 1998)

Stephen Ellis Garrett Jr. (November 11, 1974 – February 25, 2008), known professionally as Static Major (and previously as Static), was an American record producer, singer, and songwriter from Louisville, Kentucky. He is best known for his posthumous guest appearance on Lil Wayne's 2008 single "Lollipop", which peaked atop the Billboard Hot 100 and received diamond certification by the Recording Industry Association of America (RIAA). The song and its music video were both released in memory of his death in February of that year.

Prior, he formed the R&B trio Playa in 1990, which were part of the Virginia-based musical collective Swing Mob, led by DeVanté Swing. The former group signed with Def Jam Recordings and became best known for their 1998 single "Cheers 2 U", which entered the top 40 of the Billboard Hot 100 and preceded the release of their sole studio album (1998). Garrett also worked in tandem with Swing Mob cohort Timbaland to co-write Ginuwine's 1996 single "Pony" and Aaliyah's 1998 single "Are You That Somebody?", both of which saw further success at numbers six and 21 on the chart, respectively. This served as a catalyst for Garrett to continue songwriting for other artists, most extensively for the latter; this resulted in credits for her 2000 single "Try Again" and the near-entirety of her self-titled third album (2001); the releases peaked atop the Billboard Hot 100 and Billboard 200, respectively.

== Career ==
Garrett started his producing career when he joined DeVante Swing's Swing Mob. He made a breakthrough working with R&B singer Ginuwine, writing and co-producing the 1996 song "Pony" which became a major hit and a milestone in both Garrett and Timbaland's careers. Garrett later became a member of the Def Jam group Playa, who were most known for their hit single "Cheers 2 U". Playa released an album of the same name in 1998.

After working with Ginuwine, Garrett assisted in producing songs for Nicole Wray for her 1998 debut album, Make It Hot. He would eventually become the lead songwriter for Aaliyah. His songwriting collaborations with Aaliyah include: "Are You That Somebody?", which was featured on the Dr. Dolittle soundtrack, and the Romeo Must Die soundtrack singles "Come Back in One Piece" and "Try Again" (her only Billboard Hot 100 number-one single). The songs "More than a Woman", "We Need a Resolution", "Rock the Boat", "Loose Rap" (which he was also featured on), "Extra Smooth", "I Refuse", "Read Between the Lines", "Those Were the Days", and "Never No More" were all featured on her third and final studio album Aaliyah.

In 2005, Garrett collaborated with R&B group Pretty Ricky on their song "Juicy". He was featured on Lil Wayne's chart-topping 2008 song "Lollipop", which he co-wrote. The music video for "Lollipop" was dedicated to his memory.

Garrett once reflected on where his inspiration came from, saying "I stay in the streets, that's where I draw my inspiration [...] If it can't be played in the hood, then it just doesn't work for me. And nobody can hold me in harmony. My whole aura is not your typical R&B aura."

== Death ==
Garrett died at age 33 at the Baptist Hospital East in Louisville, Kentucky, on February 25, 2008, from complications of a medical procedure. Earlier that day, Garrett had felt extremely sick and went back to his hometown to seek medical attention. According to the Jefferson County Coroner's Office, he went into respiratory arrest and bled to death after the removal of a catheter that was improperly inserted into his neck. After his sudden death, Garrett's wife alleged medical negligence.

== Posthumous releases ==
Garrett was featured posthumously on Drake's 2018 song "After Dark", which peaked at number 41 on the Hot 100.

In 2020, Garrett was featured alongside Bryson Tiller on Jack Harlow's "Luv Is Dro", from his debut album Thats What They All Say.The track is largely a reworking of Static's own song "Love Is Dro", which had been previously released in 2018.

On December 17, 2021, a new posthumous single from Aaliyah was released, titled "Poison". The song featured The Weeknd, who was credited as a co-writer alongside Garrett and Belly. "Poison" contains vocals recorded by Aaliyah shortly before her death in 2001. Garrett can be heard delivering background vocals.

== Discography ==
=== Singles ===
==== As a lead artist ====
Title	Year	Peak chart positions	Album
Title	Year	US R&B	Album
"Bus Stop Breezy"	2006	—	Suppertime
"Your Valentine"	2007	—	Suppertime
"I Got My" (featuring Lil Wayne)	2007	98	Suppertime
"Till the Wheels Fall Off" (featuring Pretty Ricky)	2007	—	Suppertime

==== As a featured artist ====
List of singles, with selected chart positions and certifications, showing year released and album name
Title	Year	Peak chart positions										Certifications	Album
Title	Year	US	US R&B/HH	US Rap	AUS	CAN	GER	IRE	NZ	SWI	UK	Certifications	Album
"Crank It Up" (David Banner featuring Static Major)	2004	—	87	—	—	—	—	—	—	—	—		MTA2: Baptized in Dirty Water
"Lollipop" (Lil Wayne featuring Static Major)	2008	1	1	1	32	10	22	28	3	39	26	RIAA: Diamond; RMNZ: 2× Platinum	Tha Carter III
"After Dark" (Drake featuring Ty Dolla Sign and Static Major)	2018	41	28	—	63	40	—	—	—	—	— (Note: "After Dark" did not enter the UK Singles Chart, as chart rules only allow three songs per artist to chart within the top 100 at a time, but peaked at number 37 on the UK Streaming Chart.)	ARIA: Gold	Scorpion
"Luv Is Dro" (Jack Harlow featuring Bryson Tiller and Static Major)	2020	—	—	—	—	—	—	—	—	—	—	RMNZ: Gold	Thats What They All Say
"—" denotes a recording that did not chart or was not released in that territory.

==== Guest appearances ====
- 1995 "Gin & Juice" (with Da Bassment Crew)
- 1998 "What Cha Talkin' Bout"; "Put 'Em On" (with Timbaland & Magoo) on Tim's Bio: Life from da Bassment
- 1999 "Say My Name (Timbaland Remix)" (with Destiny's Child) on Turn It Up: The Remix Collection
- 2000 "Change the Game" (with Jay-Z) on The Dynasty: Roc La Familia
- 2001 "Loose Rap" (with Aaliyah) on Aaliyah
- 2001 "Indian Carpet"; "People Like Myself"; "I Am Music" (with Timbaland & Magoo) on Indecent Proposal
- 2004 "I Came to Bring the Pain" (with Lil' Flip) on U Gotta Feel Me
- 2005 "Juicy" (with Pretty Ricky) on Bluestars
- 2007 "Good Weather Music (Never Thought)" (with T-Hud) on Undrafted
- 2009 "Gotta Get Me One" (with Twista) on Category F5
- 2021 "Body Rock" (with 5AM) on You're Going To Be Fine
- 2023 "Nobody Else" (with EST Gee) on El Toro 2
