= Rajé Shwari =

American hip hop artist (born 1977)

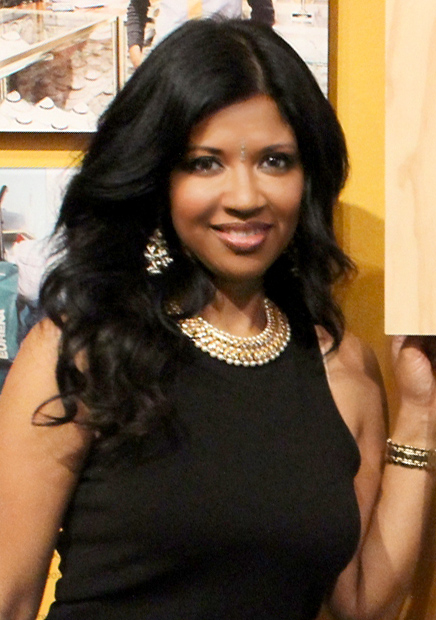

Background information
- Born: August 4, 1977 (age 49); United States
- Genres: Hip Hop, Urban, Pop, Bollywood
- Occupations: Musician, Songwriter, Producer, Entrepreneur
- Years active: 1997–present
- Labels: Sony UK, Beat Club, Interscope, BollyHood Records
- Website: www.rajeshwari.com

Rajé Shwari (born August 4, 1977) is an American hip hop artist, best known for her feature on Timbaland & Magoo's "Indian Flute". Shwari has also worked with Jay-Z, Nas, Kanye West, Missy Elliott and Pharrell.

== Early years ==
Shwari grew up outside Philadelphia, Pennsylvania, in a traditional Indian household. During her school years, she began identifying with hip-hop. She described her parents as "very strict and old fashioned", but said they allowed her the freedom of "buying records and going to rock concerts" as long as she got good grades.

Shwari's father continued this reward system by booking studio time whenever she came home with a favorable report card. During her college years, Shwari got her first record deal offer overseas, and dropped her studies to pursue music professionally.

== Music career ==
By 2005, Shwari had been dubbed "Timbaland's Protege" and was featured on his single "Indian Flute". She also worked with Jay-Z on his single "The Bounce", a tribute to the September 11 attacks, later included on the soundtrack for NBA 2K13,

In 2012, Shwari started her own production company, BollyHood.

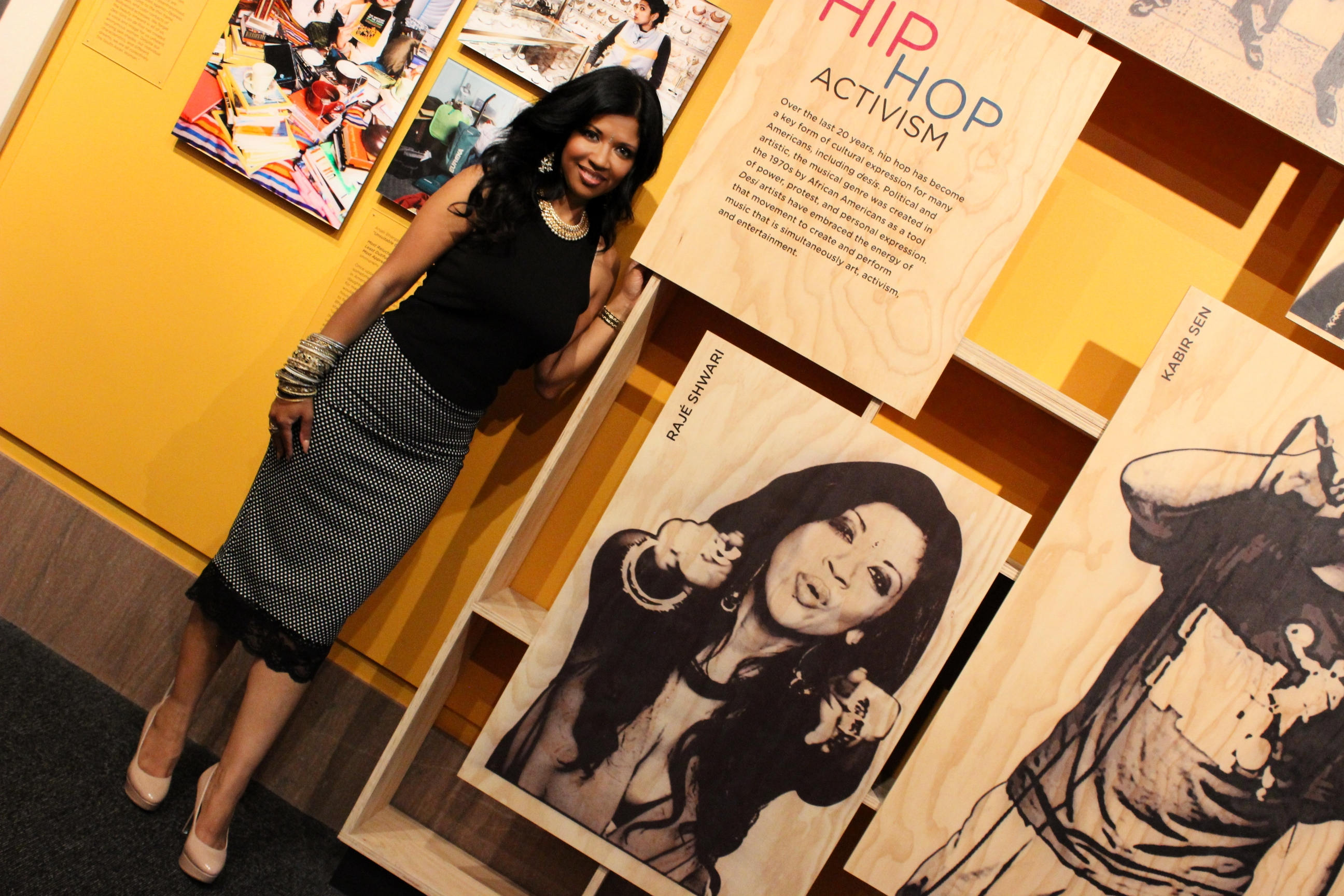
Rajé Shwari at the Beyond Bollywood Exhibit at the Smithsonian

In February 2014, Shwari was included in a permanent exhibition in the Smithsonian Institution's Natural History Museum in Washington D.C., entitled "Beyond Bollywood", which presented the contributions of prominent South Asians in the United States. Shwari was included as an example of South Asian hip-hop.

In 2015, Shwari was included in Anokhi magazine's list of the Most Prominent South Asians.

== Discography ==
Year	Title	Label
2001	Worship You	Sound Design, ZYX Music
2002	Disco (Remix)	Capitol Records
2003	Indian Flute	Blackground Records
2003	Indian Flute/Naughty Eye	Blackground Records, Universal
2003	The Bounce	Rocafella Records
2004	The Flyest	Star Trak/Sony
2005	Candyshop	Shady/Aftermath
2010	Keep A Secret	BollyHood Records
2013	Get Your Life	BollyHood Records
2014	I'm Famous in BollyHood	BollyHood Records
2016	Kitty Kat	BollyHood Records
2023	Outcaste	BollyHood Records
