= I Ain't Mad No More =

Studio album by Skillz
- Released: December 30, 2002
- Recorded: 2001–2002
- Genre: Hip hop
- Label: Rawkus/Mama's Boys
- Producer: Hi-Tek, The Neptunes, Timbaland, Naki The Beatman

Skillz chronology
From Where??? (1996)	I Ain't Mad No More (2002)	Confessions of a Ghostwriter (2005)

I Ain't Mad No More is the second album by Virginia–native rapper Skillz. The album featured guest appearances by Missy "Misdemeanor" Elliott, Danja Mowf, Kandi, Pretty Ugly, Big Swells, Musiq Soulchild, AAries, Cee-Lo Green, Pretty Willie, Jazze Pha and Nicole Wray's brother Kenny Wray.

The album generated one charting single, "Crew Deep", which peaked at #83 on Billboard Hot R&B/Hip-Hop Songs. Two other promo singles, "Your Favorite Joints" and "Ghostwriter," were excluded from the album but were added to its sampler release. The lack of success from the album's lead single ("Crew Deep") resulted in a cancellation of the album's U.S. release and a granted promotional release in Canada was made instead. However, Skillz would feature most of the album's tracks on his U.S. independent release, Confessions of a Ghostwriter (2005).

== Track listing ==
No.	Title	Length
1.	"On the Good Foot (Intro)"
2.	"S.K.I.L.L.Z." (feat. Kenny Wray)
3.	"Show Love"
4.	"Crew Deep" (feat. Missy "Misdemeanor" Elliott & Kandi)
5.	"It's Like That (K.T.N.O.)" (feat. Danja Mowf)
6.	"Wave Ya Hands!" (feat. Musiq)
7.	"Imagine"
8.	"Suzie Q" (feat. Cee-Lo Green & Jazze Pha)
9.	"Skillz vs. Shaqwan" (Skit)
10.	"PA 2 VA" (feat. Pretty Ugly & Big Swells)
11.	"Blow"
12.	"Y'all See Me" (feat. Pretty Willie)
13.	"Irma Lewis" (Interlude)
14.	"You Only Get One" (feat. AAries)

=== Leftover tracks ===
- "Your Favorite Joints"
- "Full Cooperation"
- "Off the Wall" (produced by Timbaland)
- "Ghostwriter"
