= Tim's Bio: Life from da Bassment =

Tim's Bio: From the Motion Picture – Life from da Bassment

Studio album by Timbaland
- Released: November 24, 1998
- Genre: Hip hop; R&B
- Length: 76:18
- Label: Blackground; Atlantic
- Producer: Timbaland

Timbaland chronology
Welcome to Our World (1997)	Tim's Bio: From the Motion Picture – Life from da Bassment (1998)	Indecent Proposal (2001)

Singles from Tim's Bio: Life from da Bassment
- 1. "Here We Come" Released: November 17, 1998; 2. "Keep It Real" Released: 1999; 3. "Lobster & Scrimp" Released: 1999; 4. "Can't Nobody" Released: 1999

Professional ratings
Review scores
Source	Rating
AllMusic	4/5 stars
Rolling Stone	4/5 stars
The Source	3.5/5 stars

Tim's Bio: From the Motion Picture – Life from da Bassment is a 1998 album released by Blackground Records. Though nominally the debut solo album by hip-hop/R&B producer Timbaland, the LP is technically a compilation of tracks produced by Timbaland and often – though not strictly – featuring his vocals. A litany of guest stars appear on Tim's Bio, from Timbaland's "Swing Mob" partners Magoo, Missy "Misdemeanor" Elliott, Aaliyah, Ginuwine, and Skillz, to outside performers Nas, Jay-Z, Twista and others. Tim's Bio notably marks the on-record debut of Ludacris on "Phat Rabbit", later included on his major-label debut LP Back for the First Time (2000).

The music video for "Lobster & Scrimp" featuring Jay-Z premiered on January 4, 1999. It was shot in Las Vegas, Nevada, and directed by Timbaland (credited under his real name, Tim Mosley).

In August 2021, Blackground rebranded as Blackground 2.0, with Barry Hankerson remaining as founder. Blackground 2.0 signed a distribution deal with Empire Distribution, which will re-release the label's catalogue onto digital download sites and streaming services. Tim's Bio: Life from da Bassment was rereleased on August 27, 2021.

== Track listing ==
All tracks produced by Timbaland with the help of Barry and Jomo Hankerson.

No.	Title	Writer(s)	Producer(s)	Length
1.	"Intro" (featuring T.K. Kirkland)	Tim Mosley; T.K. Kirkland	Timbaland	1:08
2.	"I Get It On" (featuring Bassey)	T. Mosley; Bassey; S. Carter	Timbaland	4:41
3.	"To My" (featuring Nas and Skillz)	T. Mosley; N. Jones; D. Lewis	Timbaland	3:44
4.	"Here We Come" (featuring Magoo and Missy "Misdemeanor" Elliott)	T. Mosley; M. Elliott; M. Barcliff; P. Webster; J. R. Harris	Timbaland	4:21
5.	"Wit' Yo' Bad Self" (featuring Skillz)	T. Mosley; D. Lewis	Timbaland	4:09
6.	"Lobster & Scrimp" (featuring Jay-Z)	T. Mosley; S. Carter	Timbaland	4:53
7.	"What Cha Know About This" (featuring Mocha and Babe Blue)	T. Mosley; Mocha; Babe Blue	Timbaland	4:31
8.	"Can't Nobody" (featuring 1 Life 2 Live and Lil' Man)	T. Mosley; Babe Blue; DJ Redhanded; Rammbo	Timbaland	4:25
9.	"What Cha Talkin' Bout" (featuring Lil' Man, Static, and Magoo)	T. Mosley; S. Garrett; M. Barcliff	Timbaland	4:33
10.	"Put 'Em On" (featuring Static and Yaushameen Michael)	T. Mosley; S. Garrett; Y. Michael	Timbaland	4:39
11.	"Fat Rabbit" (featuring Ludacris)	T. Mosley; C. Bridges	Timbaland	4:57
12.	"Who Am I" (featuring Twista)	T. Mosley; C. Mitchell	Timbaland	4:16
13.	"Talking on the Phone" (featuring Kelly Price)	T. Mosley; M. Elliott	Timbaland	5:04
14.	"Keep It Real" (featuring Ginuwine)	T. Mosley; D. Babbs; E. Lumpkin	Timbaland	3:45
15.	"John Blaze" (featuring Aaliyah and Missy Elliott)	T. Mosley; M. Elliott	Timbaland	4:00
16.	"Birthday" (featuring Playa)	T. Mosley; S. Garrett	Timbaland	4:40
17.	"3:30 in the Morning" (featuring Virginia Williams)	T. Mosley; M. Elliott	Timbaland	3:29
18.	"Outro"	T. Mosley	Timbaland	1:47
19.	"Bringin' It" (featuring Troy Mitchell)	T. Mosley; T. Mitchell	Timbaland	3:15
Total length:				76:18

Sample credits

- "Here We Come" interpolates the melody from the theme song of the 1967 Spider-Man TV series, written by Paul Francis Webster, with music composed by J. Robert Harris.

== Charts ==
=== Weekly charts ===
Chart (1998–99)	Peak position
Dutch Albums (Album Top 100)	85
US Billboard 200	41
US Top R&B/Hip-Hop Albums (Billboard)	11

=== Year-end charts ===
Chart (1999)	Position
US Top R&B/Hip-Hop Albums (Billboard)	94
