= Up Jumps da Boogie =

Single by Timbaland & Magoo

from the album Welcome to Our World
- Released: July 11, 1997
- Recorded: 1996
- Genre: Hip-hop
- Length: 4:55
- Label: Blackground; Atlantic
- Songwriters: Timothy Mosley; Melvin Barcliff; Melissa Elliott; Brian Elliott Smith Rod Temperton
- Producer: Timbaland

Timbaland & Magoo singles chronology
"Up Jumps da Boogie" (1997)	"Luv 2 Luv U" (1997)

Missy Elliott singles chronology
"Not Tonight" (Ladies Night remix) (1997)	"Up Jumps da Boogie" (1997)	"What About Us" (1997)

Aaliyah singles chronology
"4 Page Letter" (1997)	"Up Jumps da Boogie" (1997)	"The One I Gave My Heart To" (1997)

"Up Jumps da Boogie" is the debut single by hip-hop duo Timbaland & Magoo (then known as Magoo and Timbaland) featuring rapper Missy "Misdemeanor" Elliott and R&B singer Aaliyah, released on July 11, 1997, as the first single from their debut studio album, Welcome to Our World. The song peaked at No. 12 on the Billboard Hot 100 Singles chart, No. 1 on the Hot Rap Singles chart, and No. 4 on the Hot R&B/Hip-Hop Singles & Tracks chart. The song's chorus interpolates Heatwave's 1977 single "Boogie Nights".

== Track listing ==
- CD single
1. "Up Jumps da Boogie" (Radio Version) — 4:56
2. "Up Jumps da Boogie" (Short Version) — 4:11

== Charts and certifications ==
=== Weekly charts ===
Chart (1997)	Peak position
US Billboard Hot 100	12
US Hot R&B/Hip-Hop Songs (Billboard)	4
US Hot Rap Songs (Billboard)	1

=== Year-end charts ===
Chart (1997)	Position
US Billboard Hot 100	58
US Hot R&B/Hip-Hop Songs (Billboard)	28

=== Certifications ===
Region	Certification	Certified units/sales
United States (RIAA)	Gold	800,000
