= Timbaland & Magoo =

American hip-hop duo

Background information
- Origin: Norfolk, Virginia, U.S.
- Genres: Hip-hop
- Years active: 1989–2007
- Labels: Blackground; Atlantic
- Spinoff of: Swing Mob
- Past members: Timbaland; Magoo (deceased)

Timbaland & Magoo were an American hip-hop duo composed of Virginia natives Timothy "Timbaland" Mosley (born 1972) and Melvin "Magoo" Barcliff (1973–2023). Formed in 1989, the duo signed with Blackground Records, an imprint of Atlantic Records to release three albums: Welcome to Our World (1997), Indecent Proposal (2001), and Under Construction, Part II (2003). Magoo died of a heart attack in 2023.

== Later releases ==
In August 2021, Blackground Records signed a distribution deal with Empire Distribution to re-release Timbaland & Magoo's catalog on CD, cassette and vinyl, onto digital download sites and, for the first time ever, streaming services. As a result, Timbaland's 1998 LP Tim's Bio: Life from da Bassment and Timbaland & Magoo albums Welcome to Our World, Indecent Proposal and Under Construction, Part II were re-released August 27, 2021.

Magoo died on August 13, 2023, at the age of 50. His funeral service took place on September 6, 2023, in Portsmouth, Virginia.

== Discography ==
=== Albums ===
Year	Album	Chart positions		Sales and certifications
Year	Album	U.S.	GER	Sales and certifications
1997	Welcome to Our World: First studio album; Released: November 11, 1997; Format: CD, Cassette	33	–	RIAA certification: Platinum
2001	Indecent Proposal: Second studio album; Released: November 20, 2001; Format: CD, Cassette	29	–	US: 356,000
2003	Under Construction, Part II: Third studio album; Released: November 18, 2003; Format: CD, Cassette	50	75	

=== Singles ===
Year	Title	Peak chart positions					Album
Year	Title	US	US R&B	AUS	IRL	UK	Album
1997	"Up Jumps da Boogie" (featuring Missy Elliott and Aaliyah)	12	4	—	—	—	Welcome to Our World
1998	"Luv 2 Luv Ya (Remix)" (featuring Shaunta and Playa)	—	—	—	—	—	Welcome to Our World
1998	"Clock Strikes" (featuring Mad Skillz)	37	24	—	—	—	Welcome to Our World
2000	"We At It Again" (featuring Sebastian and Static)	—	79	—	—	—	Romeo Must Die (soundtrack)
2001	"Drop" (featuring Fatman Scoop)	—	105	—	—	—	Indecent Proposal
2001	"All Y'all" (featuring Tweet and Sebastian)	—	58	—	—	—	Indecent Proposal
2003	"Cop That Shit" (featuring Missy Elliott)	95	49	34	39	22	Under Construction, Part II
2003	"Indian Flute" (featuring Sebastian and Raje Shwari)	—	73	—	—	—	Under Construction, Part II
"—" denotes releases that did not chart.

=== Guest appearances ===
- S.B.I. - UH UH AH (1990); It's Like That Yaw (1991); SkullCaps (1991); If Ur Freaky (1991); Can U Get Wit It (1993); Big White Spaceship (1995)
- Jodeci - In the Meanwhile (1994); "What About Us (Swing Mob Mix)" (1994)
- Swing Mob - Plenty of Styles 1994; - "Ain't Nothing But a B Party" 1994; "Nothing but a B-Party Remix" (1995); "Dat Funk"(1995)
- DeVante Swing - Gin & Juice (Remix) [featuring Da Boogie Man, Mr. Brendal, Timbaland & Magoo, Black, Static & C-Dub] (1995)
- Ginuwine – "G. Thang" (1996)
- Missy Elliott – "Beep Me 911" (1997); "Beep Me 911 (Timbaland Remix)" (1998)
- Timbaland – "Here We Come" (1998); "What 'Cha Talkin' About" (1998)
- Playa - "Intro (Interlude)" (1998); "Derby City (Interlude)" (1998)
- The Black Russians – "Back Up out My Way" (2003)
- Timbaland – "Boardmeeting" (2007); "Magoo Verse (Timbaland Thursday)" (2011)
- Missy Elliott – "Warped" (2013)
