= Playa (group) =

American contemporary R&B group

- Origin: Louisville, Kentucky, U.S.
- Genres: R&B, hip hop
- Years active: 1990–2003, 2007–2018
- Label: Def Jam
- Past members: Smoke E. Digglera; Digital Black; Static Major

Playa was an American R&B/hip hop group, formed in 1990. The original lineup consisted of Jawaan "Smoke E. Digglera" Peacock, Benjamin "Digital Black" Bush and Stephen "Static Major" Garrett. Playa is best known for their 1998 hit song, "Cheers 2 U", produced by longtime collaborator Timbaland.

In 1995, Playa contributed to Jodeci's album The Show, the After Party, the Hotel

Static Major died in 2008, leaving Playa a duo. Since 2018, Playa has joined the R&B group Dru Hill as an additional member.

== Discography ==
=== Albums ===
- 1998: Cheers 2 U

=== Singles ===
- 1994: "Ain't Nothing But a B-Party" (feat.Timbaland & Magoo)
- 1995: "Gotta Feel Tha Vibe" (feat. Timbaland & Sista)
- 1995: "Gin & Juice (Remix Version) (feat. Da' Boogie Man, Mr. Brendal, Playa, Timbaland & Magoo)
- 1997: "Don't Stop the Music"
- 1997: "I Gotta Know" (featuring Foxy Brown, from the How to Be a Player soundtrack)
- 1998: "Cheers 2 U"
- 2000: "Love Sets You Free" (Kelly Price single)
- 2001: "Incense Burning"
- 2002: "Wrong Side of tha Bed"
- 2002: "Lust"
- 2003: "Island Girl" (feat. Timbaland)
- 2003: "I'm Available"
- 2003: "Never Too Late"
- 2003: "Weekend" (feat. Lil' Flip)
- 2009: "On the Downside" (Smoke E. Digglera feat. Static Major)
- 2009: "The Luv That I Bring" (feat. BlackFace)

=== Soundtrack and compilation contributions ===
- 1997: "Joy"; "Love 2 Luv U"; "Smoke in 'Da Air" from Welcome to Our World by Timbaland & Magoo & Ginuwine
- 1998: "Love Jones", from Still in the Game by Keith Sweat
- 1998: "Your Dress", from the Dr. Dolittle soundtrack
- 1998: "Birthday", from Tim's Bio, from the Motion Picture: Life from da Bassment by Timbaland
- 1999: "Playboy Like Me", from the Blue Streak soundtrack
- 2001: "Woozy" from the Romeo Must Die soundtrack
- 2001: "Incense Burning" from the Exit Wounds soundtrack
