= Skillz (rapper) =

American rapper

Mad Skillz
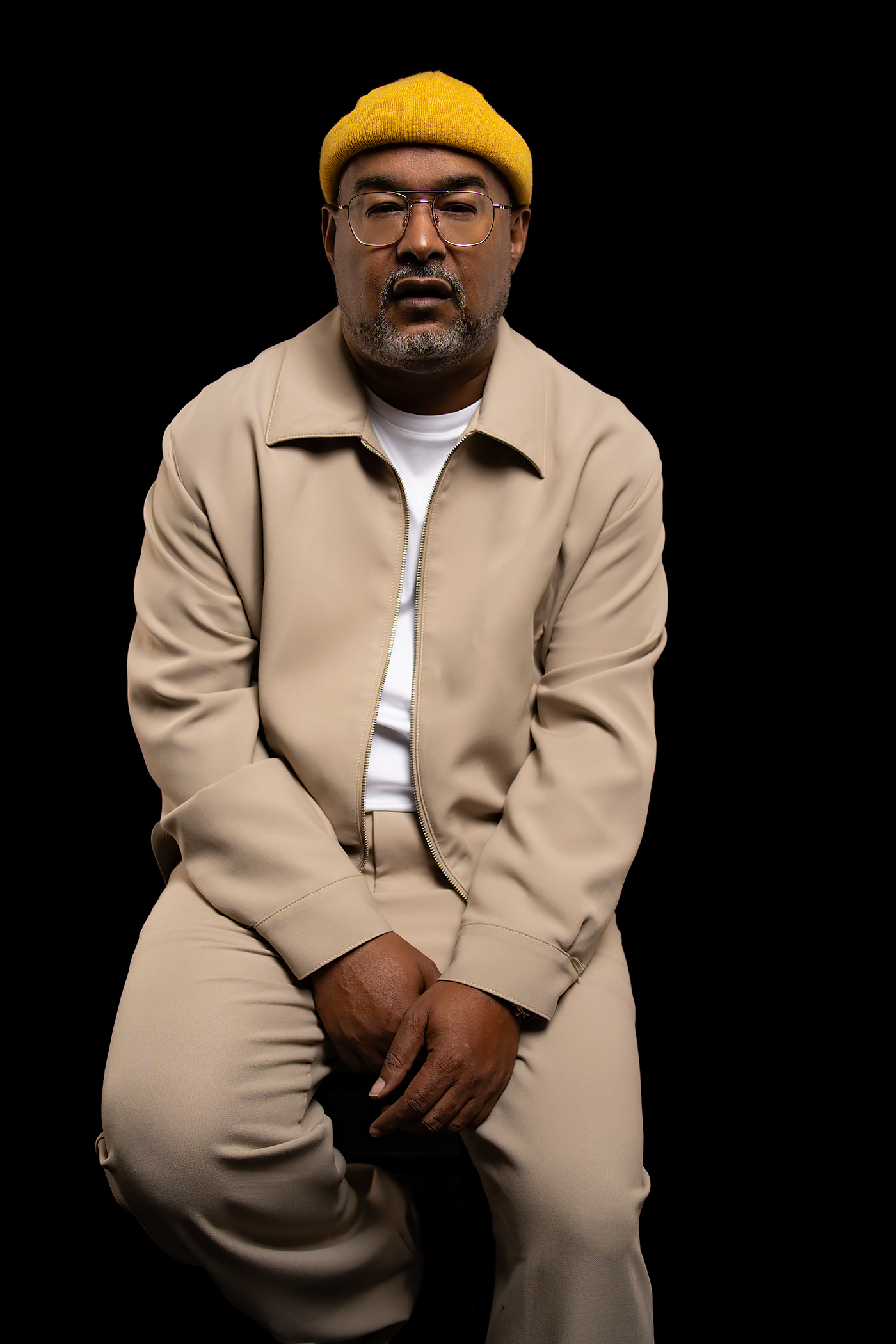
- Mad Skillz in Los Angeles, CA 2026

Background information
- Also known as: Skillz
- Born: June 2, 1974 (age 52); Detroit, Michigan, U.S.
- Origin: Richmond, Virginia, U.S.
- Genre: Hip hop
- Occupations: Rapper; Songwriter; Filmmaker; Educator; DJ
- Years active: 1992–present
- Labels: Atlantic; Big Beat; Rawkus; Sure Shot; Big Kidz; E1 Music

Donnie Shaquan Lewis (born June 2, 1974), better known by his stage name Mad Skillz (formerly Skillz), is an American rapper. He first became known for his debut album From Where??? (1996), titularly in reference to his origins in Virginia, contrary of the prototypical New York City- or Los Angeles-based rapper at the time. He is also known for his yearly "Rap Ups," which he has done annually since 2002 (except in 2013).

Skillz is also the creator of the web series "Hip Hop Confessions", a series of shows that gathers hip hop purists and hip hop lovers alike where they reveal something hip hop related that they have never told anyone. The show has featured Q-Tip, Peanut Butter Wolf, Kwamé and DJ Jazzy Jeff.

Skillz earned a 2025 Grammy Nomination for Best Spoken Word Poetry Album for the album The Seven Number Ones. For the 2026 Grammy Awards, he won a Grammy for his album Words For Days Vol. 1 in the Best Spoken Word Poetry Album category.

== Early life ==
Lewis was born June 2, 1974, in Detroit, Michigan, and after spending his early childhood in Fayetteville, North Carolina he then moved to Richmond, Virginia at a young age. He credits Run DMC for getting him involved in hip hop as a child.

== Career ==
He first made a name for himself by finishing in second place (Losing to MC Supernatural) in a national freestyle competition, which eventually resulted in a recording contract with Atlantic Records. At this time he went by the stage name Mad Skillz rather than just Skillz. Mad Skillz' Atlantic debut album, From Where???, and its single, "The Nod Factor", were released in 1996, but neither received much commercial or critical attention. The album's title was a reference to the regionalism in hip-hop, and at the time the state of Virginia did not have a large hip-hop scene. In the late-1990s more of a Virginia scene emerged, and he allied himself with fellow Virginia natives due to his new friendship with Magoo. He made appearances on Timbaland & Magoo's albums Tim's Bio in 1998, and Indecent Proposal in 2001; Timbaland made plans to sign Skillz to the Blackhand label he was developing; however, this label failed to materialize. He along with Danja Mowf, & Lonnie B, members of Skillz' Supafriendz collective, also appeared on a remix of Aaliyah's hit single "Are You That Somebody" which would go on to sell over a half a million copies in 1998.

In 2000 Skillz was known for his single "Ghostwriter". The lyrics say he has written hit singles for others.

Skillz eventually got a deal with Rawkus, where he recorded his 2002 LP I Ain't Mad No More, the title of which commemorated the official change of his MC moniker from "Mad Skillz" to just "Skillz." The aforementioned LP was never officially released in the U.S., however, during the Sprite Liquid Mix Tour in 2003 he sold some bootleg versions of this CD. The CD was re-packaged without several tracks as "Confessions Of A Ghostwriter" in 2005. A Supafriends LP, "The 804 CompilationSupavision and another solo LP.

Skillz released an album on December 30, 2014: Made In Virginia, produced enirely by Bink Dog. In 1997 Skillz became the founder of the supergroup, V.A. Playaz Supafriendz, which members consisted of Timbaland & Magoo, Ginuwine, N.E.R.D., Missy Elliott, Nicole Wray, DJ Lonnie B, Tank, Sebastian, Tweet, Aaliyah, Danja Mowf, and Clipse. In 2018 he released "I'm The DJ & The Rapper a compilation of songs that were all written by him. As of late he partnered with Gavin Williams and released an ep under a group called "The Bop Gods". He has recently gone back to his original moniker Mad Skillz and has returned to producing and deejaying and filmmaking.

In 2018 and 2020 Skillz was an artist-in-residence at the University of Richmond where he taught The Voice of Hip Hop in America. On February 13, 2019, Mayor Levar Stoney declared it to be "Mad Skillz Day" in Richmond, VA to commemorate the 23rd anniversary of Skillz's debut album From Where??? and to recognize his "positive influence on our city." On January 14, 2020, he began his second semester as an artist-in residence at the University of Richmond.

In 2021 he adapted and wrote the lyrics for Jay Z's Rock and Roll Hall Of Fame induction video which was recited by some of the biggest names in entertainment from Tyler Perry to David Letterman, Beyonce, Rihanna, Chris Martin, Jurnee Smollett, Lupita Nyongo, Johnathan Majors, Questlove, MC Lyte, Jeymes Samuel, Ed Sheeran, DJ Clark Kent, Chris Rock, Trevor Noah, Lin Manuel Miranda, Lebron James, Rick Ross, Jermaine Dupri, The Rza, Usher, Samuel Jackson, Queen Latifah, Jamie Foxx, Lena Waithe, SZA, Kevin Hart, Tracee Ellis Ross, Lenny Kravitz, Alicia Keys, H.E.R, Kerry Washington, John Legend, Common, and Jay Z's oldest daughter Blu Ivy. He was commissioned by Questlove from The Roots to craft it and wrote and recorded it in nine days.

In 2025 and 2026 Skillz earned two back to back Grammy nominations for Best Spoken Word Poetry Album for the albums The Seven Number Ones. & Words For Days Vol. 1 eventually winning a Grammy Award for "Words For Days Vol. 1

== Discography ==
=== Albums ===
- 1996: From Where???
- 2002: I Ain't Mad No More
- 2005: Confessions of a Ghostwriter
- 2008: The Million Dollar Backpack
- 2010: The World Needs More Skillz
- 2012: Thoughts Become Things
- 2014: Made in Virginia (with Bink!)
- 2018: Im The DJ..and The Rapper
- 2023: The Bop Gods
- 2024: The Seven Number Ones
- 2025 Words For Days Vol. 1

=== Compilations/Mixtapes ===
- 2002: The Neptunes Collection Vol. 1
- 2004: The James Brown Collection
- 2006: Got Skillz? - The Timbaland Collection
- 2009: Design of A Decade (J. Period & Don Cannon)
- 2011: Infamous Quotes Mixtape

=== Singles ===
==== As lead artist ====
List of singles, with selected chart positions, showing year released and album name
Title	Year	Peak chart positions			Album
Title	Year	US	US R&B	US Rap	Album
"The Nod Factor"	1995	—	76	26	From Where???
"Move Ya Body"	1996	—	85	27	From Where???
"Y'all Don't Wanna"	2001	—	92	6	Confessions of a Ghost Writer
"Crew Deep" (featuring Missy "Misdemeanor" Elliott and Kandi)	2002	—	83	—	I Ain't Mad No More
"Off the Wall"	2003	—	—	—	I Ain't Mad No More
"Suzie Q" (featuring Cee-Lo Green and Jazze Pha)	2004	—	—	—	Confessions of a Ghost Writer
"2010 Rap Up"	2011	—	92	—	—N/a

==== As featured artist ====
List of singles, with selected chart positions, showing year released and album name
Title	Year	Peak chart positions			Album
Title	Year	US	US R&B	US Rap	Album
"One for the Money" (Royce da 5'9" featuring Skillz and Diamond D)	2012	—	—	—	TBA

=== Features ===
Title	Year	Artist	Album
Dynamite Soul II	1995	Artifacts	—N/a
Clock Strikes (Remix)	1997	Timbaland & Magoo	Welcome to Our World
To My	1998	Timbaland, Nas	Tim's Bio: Life from da Bassment
Wit Yo Bad Self	1998	Timbaland	Tim's Bio: Life from da Bassment
Lick the Balls	1999	—N/a	Eastern Conference All-Stars
B-Boy Document	1999	Mos Def, The High & Mighty	Soundbombing II / Home Field Advantage
Pressure Time	2001	—N/a	East. Conf. All-Stars 2
In Time	2001	Timbaland & Magoo	Indecent Proposal
The X (Y'all Know the Name)	2002	The X-Ecutioners,Xzibit, Pharoahe Monch, Inspectah Deck	Built from Scratch
Crew Deep	2002	Missy Elliott, Kandi	Soundbombing III
They Don't Flow	2002	Novel	Soundbombing III
In Love with the Mic	2004	The Roots, Truck North	The Tipping Point
1mc 1dj	2004	Pete Rock	Soul Survivor II
2K6	2005	—N/a	2K6: The Tracks
