= Indecent Proposal (album) =

Studio album by Timbaland & Magoo
- Released: November 20, 2001
- Recorded: 1999–2000
- Studio: Manhattan Center Studios (New York City)
- Genre: Hip hop; R&B
- Length: 1:07:08
- Label: Blackground; Virgin
- Producer: Barry Hankerson (exec.); Jomo Hankerson (exec.); Timbaland (also exec.); Craig Brockman

Timbaland & Magoo chronology
Welcome to Our World (1997)	Indecent Proposal (2001)	Under Construction, Part II (2003)

Timbaland chronology
Tim's Bio: Life from da Bassment (1998)	Indecent Proposal (2001)	Under Construction, Part II (2003)

Singles from Indecent Proposal
- 1. "Drop" Released: May 2001; 2. "All Y'all" Released: October 2001

Professional ratings
Review scores
Source	Rating
AllMusic	3/5 stars
NME	3.5/5 stars
RapReviews	8.5/10
Slant Magazine	3/5 stars
Spin	7/10

Indecent Proposal is the second studio album by American hip hop duo Timbaland & Magoo. It was released on November 20, 2001, through Blackground/Virgin Records. Production was entirely handled by Timbaland himself, except for two songs, which were produced with Craig Brockman. It features guest appearances from Sebastian, Petey Pablo, Sin, Tweet, Aaliyah, DJ S&S, Fatman Scoop, Jay-Z, Ludacris, Mad Skillz, Ms. Jade, Troy Mitchell and Twista. The album is dedicated to the memory of Aaliyah, who had died in a plane crash on August 25, 2001.

The two official singles from Indecent Proposal were "Drop", and the Indian-influenced "All Y'all".

== Background ==
The LP was due to have been issued in November 2000 - "Roll Out" was issued as a promo single that fall - but was held over for an entire year after a series of distribution changes and release date postponements. Two tracks, "Hummin (Interlude)" (a Timbaland solo track) and "Drama", which features Petey Pablo, Sebastian, but were originally issued on the album, but was removed afterwards.

== Track listing ==
No.	Title	Writer(s)	Producer(s)	Length
1.	"Intro" (featuring DJ S&S)	Timothy Mosley; Stephen Everett	Timbaland	1:06
2.	"Drop" (featuring Fatman Scoop)	T. Mosley; Melvin Barcliff; Isaac Freeman III	Timbaland	6:00
3.	"All Y'all" (featuring Tweet and Sebastian)	T. Mosley; Barcliff; Charlene Keys; Garland Mosley	Timbaland	3:57
4.	"It's Your Night" (featuring Sin and Sebastian)	T. Mosley; Barcliff; Wendy Charlott; G. Mosley	Timbaland	5:55
5.	"Indian Carpet" (featuring Static Major)	T. Mosley; Barcliff; Shawn Carter	Timbaland	4:24
6.	"Party People" (featuring Jay-Z and Twista)	T. Mosley; Barcliff; Carter; Carl Mitchell	Timbaland	5:18
7.	"People Like Myself" (featuring Static Major and Sebastian)	T. Mosley; Barcliff; G. Mosley	Timbaland	4:37
8.	"Voice Mail" (Interlude) (featuring Michelle Robinson)	T. Mosley; Craig Brockman	Timbaland; Craig Brockman	1:07
9.	"Serious" (featuring Petey Pablo and Sebastian)	T. Mosley; Barcliff; Moses Barrett III; G. Mosley	Timbaland	3:47
10.	"Roll Out" (featuring Petey Pablo and Sebastian)	T. Mosley; Barcliff; Barrett III; G. Mosley	Timbaland	4:27
11.	"Love Me" (featuring Tweet and Petey Pablo)	T. Mosley; Keys; Barrett III; Brockman	Timbaland; Craig Brockman	3:58
12.	"Baby Bubba" (featuring Petey Pablo)	T. Mosley; Barcliff; Barrett III	Timbaland	4:23
13.	"In Time" (featuring Ms. Jade and Mad Skillz)	T. Mosley; Barcliff; Chevon Young	Timbaland	3:40
14.	"Mr. Richards" (Interlude) (featuring Petey Pablo)	T. Mosley; Barrett III	Timbaland	0:50
15.	"Considerate Brotha" (featuring Ludacris)	T. Mosley; Barcliff; Christopher Bridges	Timbaland	4:12
16.	"Beat Club" (featuring Sin, Troy Mitchell and Sebastian)	T. Mosley; Barcliff; Charlott; Troy Mitchell; G. Mosley	Timbaland	4:47
17.	"I Am Music" (featuring Aaliyah and Static Major)	T. Mosley; Stephen Garrett	Timbaland	3:59
Total length:				1:07:08

== Charts ==
Chart (2001)	Peak position
French Albums (SNEP)	135
US Billboard 200	29
US Top R&B/Hip-Hop Albums (Billboard)	3
