= Aaliyah: The Princess of R&B =

2014 biographical TV film directed by Bradley Walsh

- Promotional poster
- Based on: Aaliyah: More than a Woman by Christopher John Farley
- Written by: Michael Elliot
- Directed by: Bradley Walsh
- Starring: Alexandra Shipp; Clé Bennett; Elise Neal
- Country of origin: United States
- Original language: English

Production
- Producers: Debra Martin Chase; Howard Braunstein; Wendy Williams
- Cinematography: André Pienaar
- Editor: David B. Thompson
- Running time: 90 minutes

Original release
- Network: Lifetime
- Release: November 15, 2014

Aaliyah: The Princess of R&B is a 2014 American biographical television film directed by Bradley Walsh and based on the life and career of R&B music star Aaliyah, following her rise to fame and death at age 22 when she was killed in a plane crash. The film is also based on the biography Aaliyah: More than a Woman by Christopher John Farley. The film premiered on Lifetime on November 15, 2014, and was met with criticism in its early stages of production due to Aaliyah's family's disapproval of Lifetime's choice to create the film. The film drew 3.2 million viewers upon its premiere, making it the second highest-rated television film of 2014, despite overwhelmingly negative reviews.

== Plot ==
In 1989, 10-year-old Aaliyah Haughton makes her debut TV appearance on Star Search performing a rendition of "My Funny Valentine". Aaliyah's mother Diane Haughton once aspired to pursue her own career in singing, but is now willing to do anything to help her daughter's take off. Aaliyah's uncle Barry Hankerson is a record producer and the founder and owner of record label Blackground Records. After losing Star Search, Hankerson's ex-wife, Gladys Knight requests to perform with Aaliyah during a five-night stint in Las Vegas. In 1991, Aaliyah is informed by her uncle that she has been offered a record deal with Blackground Records and a signing with Jive Records.

Aaliyah's Uncle Barry approaches one of his biggest clients, R. Kelly to write and produce for his niece. Though disinterested at first, Kelly agrees to write and produce Aaliyah's album after hearing her sing "Save the Best for Last". Following the release of her debut single "Back & Forth" in May, 1994, Aaliyah becomes a teen success, with "Age Ain't Nothing But A Number" hitting number one, but speculations about her and Kelly dating begin to spread, and although Aaliyah continues to deny any status between the friendship with him. But it is later revealed that the two had illegally married, with Aaliyah lying about her age. Aaliyah's angry parents swear to have the marriage annulled by ending their relationship, and Aaliyah's father Michael threatens to have Kelly charged and arrested with statutory rape otherwise, leaving Aaliyah heartbroken and depressed. She later begins working on her second album with Timbaland and Missy Elliott, when her heart is crushed once again upon discovering through the news that Kelly is now married to his backing dancer, Andrea Lee.

Aaliyah's second album One in a Million, featuring the single "Got to Give It Up", is released in 1996, which goes double platinum in the US, making Aaliyah one of the biggest names in music, and recurring her title as The Princess of R&B. The following year, she records "Journey to the Past", the theme song to the film Anastasia, which she performs at the Oscars. She is later offered a role as Trish O'Day in the film Romeo Must Die, co-starring Jet Li. Meanwhile, Aaliyah's mother becomes concerned for her daughter's personal life, and tries to convince her to start dating, but Aaliyah is still disheartened from her separation from Kelly. Aaliyah attends the Hollywood premiere of Romeo Must Die, where she states her next aspired role lies with the upcoming film Queen of the Damned, an adaptation of one of her favorite books.

Following her movie success, Aaliyah moves to New York City where she meets Damon Dash, and the two fall in love. A year later, Aaliyah is set to travel via plane to The Bahamas to shoot a music video for "Rock the Boat", from her third (and final) album, Aaliyah. Damon sees Aaliyah to her limo, the two share a final kiss goodbye, and promise each other, that upon her return, they'll start taking their relationship more seriously, and prioritizing each other over their careers. As the limo drives away, Aaliyah waves goodbye and blows a kiss to Damon, who mouths "I love you", to which she mouths in response, "I love you too". The film ends with texts stating: "On August 25, 2001, after shooting the 'Rock the Boat' music video in the Bahamas, Aaliyah and eight others were killed when their plane crashed shortly after takeoff. She was twenty-two when she died. Her music and legacy will remain in our hearts forever".

== Cast ==
- Alexandra Shipp as Aaliyah
- Rachael Crawford as Diane Haughton
- Clé Bennett as R. Kelly
- Lyriq Bent as Barry Hankerson
- Elise Neal as Gladys Knight
- Sterling Jarvis as Michael Haughton
- Anthony Grant as Damon Dash
- Christopher Jacot as Ryan Nichols
- Dewshane Williams as Derek Lee
- Izaak Smith as Timbaland
- Chattrisse Dolabaille as Missy Elliott
- A.J. Saudin as Rashad Haughton (Older)
- Andy McQueen as Eric Ferrell
- Elena Juatco as Press Member
- Morgan Kelly as Senior Label Executive
- Sherton Sanderson as Damon's Friend
- Tiffany Davidson as Keisha

== Production ==
In June 2014 Lifetime announced their intent to film a biopic that would focus on the life of Aaliyah. This decision was met with criticism by the singer's family, who did not believe that Lifetime was the best venue for the film and that they did not approve of the production as a whole. As the record label ran by Barry and Jomo Hankerson, Aaliyah's uncle and cousin, held control over the masters to Aaliyah's recordings, they did not allow Lifetime access to that material, resulting in the company having to record covers for the songs used in the film. Four of her songs (two covers) were used in the film: the Isley Brothers' "At Your Best (You Are Love)," Marvin Gaye's "Got to Give It Up," "Journey to the Past" and "The One I Gave My Heart To."

The decision to bring on actress and singer Zendaya to perform as Aaliyah was also met with criticism, as people felt that Zendaya was too light skinned and did not greatly resemble Aaliyah. She later dropped out of the project and the role of Aaliyah was recast with Alexandra Shipp. Zendaya explained her reasons for leaving the production, stating, "The main reason is that the production value wasn't there, there were complications with the music rights, and I just felt like it wasn't being handled delicately considering the situation", also adding she tried contacting the singer's family to no avail. In order to prepare for her role, Alexandra Shipp watched archive footage of Aaliyah and listened to her songs in order to try to mimic her mannerisms and singing voice.

== Reception ==
Critical reception to Aaliyah: The Princess of R&B has been predominantly negative. Jon Caramanica of The New York Times panned the film, criticizing it as "ham-handed" and "underwhelming" and writing "Condensing the singer's life into such a short space requires a cruel knife and, in this case, a wildly imprecise one. A good film doesn't show its seams. This one — based on Aaliyah: More Than a Woman, a biography by Christopher John Farley — is mostly seams. Much of the acting has dull edges, and the screenplay is aggravatingly stilted." The Wall Street Journal also criticized the film, commenting that the "overuse of the three and four-way split screen montages only enhanced the lack of material."

Viewer reaction for the film has been extremely negative and fans mocked the film on social media websites, using the hashtags #LifetimeBiopics and #LifetimeBeLike. Viewers felt that Shipp was miscast as Aaliyah, that the late singer's controversial relationship with R. Kelly was overly romanticized, and that the music covers did not do justice to the original songs. Fans further commented on the film's casting as a whole and many created pictures that overly exaggerated what they felt was extreme miscasting of many of the celebrities depicted in the film.
