= One in a Million (Aaliyah song) =

1996 single by Aaliyah

Single by Aaliyah

from the album One in a Million
- A-side: "If Your Girl Only Knew"; "The One I Gave My Heart To"
- Released: November 12, 1996
- Recorded: 1996
- Studio: Pyramid (Ithaca, New York)
- Genre: R&B; club
- Length: 4:30
- Label: Blackground; Atlantic
- Songwriters: Melissa Elliott; Timothy Mosley
- Producer: Timbaland

Aaliyah singles chronology
"Got to Give It Up" (1996)	"One in a Million" (1996)	"4 Page Letter" (1997)

Music video
- "One in a Million" on YouTube

"One in a Million" is a song by American singer Aaliyah from her second studio album of the same title (1996). It was written by both Missy Elliott and Timbaland with the latter producing the song. It was released to Rhythmic contemporary radio as the third single from One in a Million by Blackground and Atlantic Records on November 12, 1996. Musically, the song is an R&B and club ballad with trip hop and drum and bass influences. While lyrically, it is about the narrator (Aaliyah) professing her love for a man whom she identifies as being her "one in a million".

Upon its release, it was met with generally positive reviews from critics, with many praising the song's innovative production. "One in a Million" was a moderate commercial success, peaking at number 25 on the US Hot 100 Airplay chart and number one on the Hot R&B Airplay chart. Released as a double A-side single with "If Your Girl Only Knew" in the United Kingdom, the song peaked at number 15 on the UK Singles Chart. "One in a Million" was nominated for Best R&B/Soul Single – Female at the 1998 Soul Train Music Awards.

An accompanying video for "One in a Million" was directed by Paul Hunter, and it depicts Aaliyah in various futuristic settings as she mingles with her crush. The video also featured cameo appearances from Timbaland, Missy Elliott, and singer Ginuwine, who stars as one of her leading men. The video received critical acclaim, with many critics comparing the video to various sci-fi films.

== Recording and production ==
Along with "If Your Girl Only Knew", "One in a Million" was one of the earliest songs which Aaliyah recorded with Timbaland and Missy Elliott. According to Elliott, she wrote the song in a rap-singing style because she didn't know how to write songs for singers, explaining: "Because I wasn't really a singer like that, that's why I wrote like that, because I was a rapper, but I didn't know how to do a bunch of runs, so every record that I would attack, I would attack it like I'm rap-singing it." During the earliest stages of the recording process, Elliott was scared to play the record to Aaliyah because the song's sound was very different. However, once Aaliyah heard the song, she liked it. In regards to Aaliyah enjoying the song, Elliott said that "she had an ear and she knew what that music made her feel like. She was next level to understand that this is some next level [music]. This is not just the sound that's going on right now — this is a new sound that is being created. This whole movement is new".

Once the song was completed and sent to radio, radio stations initially didn't want to play it. Many stations made excuses as to why they couldn't play the song by saying "they couldn't blend it in, they couldn't mix it in with records before it or after it because the cadence hadn't been done before". According to Blackground Records CEO Jomo Hankerson, many radio station program directors had a problem with what they called "cricket sounds" in the song. Hankerson recalled that a program director in Chicago stated that he would not play a record that had crickets in it. When trying to create a solution so that "One in a Million" could get played on the radio, Atlantic Records suggested that the song be remixed and made more radio-friendly. Hankerson refused to change the song and took the tapes out of the studio so that no one could remix it, stating: "Atlantic thought we should remix the record and take the triple-beat down to make it more radio-friendly, but we were very bullheaded about it. We heard they were trying to get remixes done, so we took the tapes out the studio! Back in those days before Pro Tools you could really control where the music went. If you had that two-inch reel, you had the record. So we grabbed the two-inch reels and all the tapes so nobody could do any unauthorized remixes and we stuck to our guns on that version of the record".

== Music and lyrics ==
"One in a Million" is an ethereal mid-tempo R&B and club ballad. The record also fuses elements of other genres such as funk, electronica, trip hop and drum and bass. In his book Bring the Noise: 20 Years of Writing About Hip Rock and Hip Hop (2011), author–journalist Simon Reynolds described the song as having a "jungle-at-ballad tempo" with "stop-start beats twisting your torso and stuttering triple-time kick drums pummeling the solar-plexus". Andrew Unterberger from Billboard said it is a "twitchy, booming slow jam that sounded both lush and minimal, expansive and intimate, alien and sexy". Its production, "bursts of rapid-fire staccato beats", while also incorporating, "shimmering" synths and crickets. Craig Jenkins from Complex, further mentioned that other sounds utilized within the instrumental includes, "sultry funk accented by hyperactive drum programming" along with "the sounds of birds, crickets and aircraft scattered around the mix". The Boombox stated it, "immediately captures your full attention with its pounding bass, quirky synths and chopped vocal samples".

Melodically, "One in a Million" "cadences are similar to those of a rapper", as "she rides the currents of the undulating groove as if she were piloting a hang glider through them". In her biography Aaliyah: A Biography (2014) author Jennifer Warner explained that, "Aaliyah's slow soulful down tempo singing is juxtaposed against Timbaland's drum-and-bass mixing that set the song apart from typical rhythm and blues offerings of the mid–1990s." Chris Richards from The Washington Post said, "Aaliyah sings in her steadiest, warmest, coolest voice, gently melting time as she stretches her syllables". Richards also thinks, "that first "on" holds the highest note in the phrase, but just barely — so she's conjuring infinity here, but with almost zero effort. It's paralyzing". Author Kirsty Fairclough noted that the record has "maximal vocalization" and that towards the end Aaliyah's voice "stops again, with a twangy guitar sound picking up the outro".

Lyrically, the song is about Aaliyah professing her love for a man whom "she views as one in a million and a love she can't resist". Bob Waliszewski from Plugged In stated a similar sentiment that, she "communicates love and commitment to her man" on the song. She expresses that notion by singing, "Baby you don't know, what you do to me/Between me and you, I feel a chemistry/Won't let no one come and take your place/Cause the love you give can't be replaced". The Washington Post writer Chris Richards felt that there is a shift during certain parts of the lyrics. According Richards, "Then the second line of the couplet turns it all upside down: "You give me a really good feeling all day long." A really good feeling? Is that all this song is about? Or is she downplaying a cosmic passion by phrasing it in casual teenage love-letter language?".

== Critical reception ==
According to Khal from Complex, "One in a Million" "showcased an unstoppable trio, with Aaliyah being a perfect muse for the futuristic vibes that Missy and Timbaland were creating, and truthfully helped change the game. No longer did your slow songs have to have slow drum beats; you could establish that vibe and throw as many fills and skittery hi-hats into the track and make it something unique instead of the flavor of the week (although being so future means that everyone was in demand)". Georgette Cline from The Boombox praised the song, saying "The instrumental itself dripped with sex appeal and Aaliyah's musical stylings only enhanced the vibe. The then 17-year-old struck lyrical gold with, Won't let no one come and take your place/ 'Cause the love you give can't be replaced/ See no one else love me like you do/ That's why I don't mind to spend my life with you." Quentin B. Huff from PopMatters felt that the song represented Aaliyah "better in the slow jam department". He also praised the production of the song, saying: "The beat for "One in a Million" is awfully hard for a romantic song, but that's the point, actually: love—or, at least the type of love portrayed in this song—is beautiful but continual and inexorable". Music publication udiscovermusic felt that Aaliyah's "ethereal vocals" was on full display on the song and that overall the song was "the perfect distillation of all the pervasive sounds of the era".

In a retrospective review, Billboard, praised Aaliyah's vocals on the track, saying that she "effortlessly dominates the beat through her inexplicably captivating swagger and tone". Overall, the publication felt that the songs sound "remained untouched" and that it stood apart from other songs from its time period - "Aaliyah was simply ahead of her time — and as always, truly one in a million". Variety writers stated that at the time of its release "there was nothing quite like it on the radio, they would go on to praise the song saying: "Missy's pen game, amalgamated with Timbaland's bird and cricket-laden production and Aaliyah's rap-singing stylings, made for a track that was true to its title".

== Commercial performance ==
"One in a Million" peaked atop the US Hot R&B Airplay chart on January 4, 1997. By February 1997 the song had accumulated 43.6 million in audience impressions at urban contemporary radio. On the Top 40/Rhythm-Crossover chart, the song peaked within the top five at number two on March 1, 1997. On March 22, 1997, the song peaked within the top 40 on the Hot 100 Airplay chart at number 25. "One in a Million" also peaked at number two on the US Dance Club Songs on May 10, 1997. Due to its radio-only release in the United States, "One in a Million" was ineligible to enter the Billboard Hot 100, as Billboard's rules at the time allowed only commercially available singles to chart. Billboard further explained that the song, along with others were withheld from a commercial release to elicit high album debuts.

"One in a Million" was released as a double A-side single with "If Your Girl Only Knew" in the United Kingdom, peaking at number 15 on the UK Singles Chart. The song peaked within the top five on the UK Dance Chart on May 25, 1997, and on the UK R&B Chart on June 29, 1997. According to the Official Charts Company (OCC), "One in a Million" is Aaliyah's sixth best-selling single in the United Kingdom. The song also peaked within the top 20 in New Zealand, at number 11, on June 15, 1997.

In August 2021, it was reported that the album and Aaliyah's other recorded work for Blackground (since rebranded as Blackground Records 2.0) would be re-released on physical, digital, and streaming services in a deal between the label and Empire Distribution. One in a Million was reissued on August 20, 2021, despite Aaliyah's estate issuing a statement in response to Blackground 2.0's announcement, denouncing the "unscrupulous endeavor to release Aaliyah's music without any transparency or full accounting to the estate". Following the album's re-release, "One in a Million" debuted at number seven on the US Digital Song Sales the week of September 4, 2021.

== Music video ==
=== Background ===
The music video for "One in a Million" was directed by Paul Hunter and was filmed in Los Angeles. Hunter first met Aaliyah through her uncle while at a meeting in a New York studio; soon after their meeting, he was chosen as the director for the video. According to Hunter, everything went well during the filming and they remained on schedule. Hunter also recalled that when they were moving to another shooting location, Aaliyah drove in the car with the production crew. He stated: "She was this young superstar and we need to go to the next location and she just rides over with the crew", adding: "She didn't call for a limo or anything. It was really cute. She was just a regular girl in that respect, y'know?".

=== Fashion ===
Aaliyah's image was widely noted as more sensual and mature in the video than in her previous appearances.

For the music video she worked with stylist Derek Lee for the first time. In an interview with Complex, Lee recalled that his agent referred him to Aaliyah due to her having issues with other stylists. "My agent said stylists were always bringing her stuff she didn't like because they always wanted to put her in a dress,". "And once I found out it was Aaliyah, I was like yeah. This is right up my alley." After meeting with Aaliyah, Lee got a call asking if he could immediately fly back to Los Angeles to style the "One In A Million" video. Due to it being short notice "he had to bring completely new pieces and only had a few hours to retrieve them". He retrieved clothes from sex shops on Christopher Street in New York's West Village because it was "the only clothing stores open late at night". He also asked his "stylist assistant in LA to request the motorcycle jumpsuit she wore to be sent from New York to Los Angeles overnight".

=== Theme and synopsis ===
While analyzing the videos theme, author Christopher John Farley, stated the "tone is both urban and urbane; it's a balance that Aaliyah would strike often throughout her career". Farley also mentioned that "the sets are futuristic in a ruined future, Blade Runner sort a way: In one sequence, it looks as if Aaliyah is inside a giant clock of some sort". In her assessment of the video Warner explained, that "the viewer is given an experience rather than a plot". In his biography Aaliyah (2021), author Tim Footman said in the video, "she moves through a series of apocalyptic, Mad max-style sets, her clothing and appearance changing with every frame." Footman also noted that "where some performers appear as just another piece of scenery in their videos, Aaliyah was part of the action, a full participant in the world Hunter created for her (even if it didn't make any coherent sense). She wasn't just performing – she was acting".

The video for "One in a Million", "helped establish Aaliyah's signature style". It begins "with her lying on a car hood, her midriff bare, it's a scene that is casually provocative." The scene also depicts several reporters and fans rushing to the car. Then, the scene switches to a dark room where Aaliyah is sitting as Ginuwine approaches her. In another scene, she is watching him in an off white-colored room via security camera. The scene shifts to a completely white room where Aaliyah is dancing with another male and then to the scene where Ginuwine is looking at the security camera. In the latter scene, Aaliyah enters the room and reveals a tattoo of her name on Ginuwine's arm. Once again, the scene goes back to the dark room, but this time Aaliyah is standing up and performing in a white bodysuit. The video ends with Aaliyah riding on the back of a motorcycle with Dealz a nephew of Michael Jackson.

=== Release and reception ===
During its chart run, the video for "One in a Million" received heavy television airplay on multiple networks. For the week ending November 10, 1996, the video made its television debut on BET and November 26 on The Box. Eventually, the video became the eighth most-played video on BET for the week ending February 16, 1997. For the week ending January 5, 1997, the video made its television debut on MTV. The video became the seventh most-played video on MTV the week ending February 23, 1997. In February 1997, the video for "One in a Million" made its television debut on the cable network channel VH1.

In a 1997 article briefly discussing the video, MTV felt that Aaliyah was getting "all grown up and steamy in the video". Jordan Simon from Idolator felt that the video for "One in a Million" displayed a striking resemblance to various futuristic science fiction films, such as Aliens, The Fifth Element and The Matrix. The video was featured on Complex's list "The Best R&B Videos of the '90s", with writer Ernest Baker saying that the plot in which Ginuwine and Aaliyah take turns and "borderline" stalk each other, "gives new meaning to the song's mantra: "Your love love is a one in a million." Steffanee Wang from Nylon wrote, "Only Aaliyah could rock a silver eye-patch and crystal bikini top simultaneously in this looks-filled visual that leans heavily into the tech-dystopia fantasy that ruled the late '90s/Y2K visual era." Entertainment Weekly writer Brandon Caldwell said, "When the video for the album's title track hit TV screens, several months after Million's debut, Aaliyah had officially entered a new phase of her career. The choreography, the outfits, and the swoop bang over her eye would soon become a popular fixture in beauty shops, as she took on a dark and mysterious persona from performance to music video."

== Live performances ==
On February 14, Aaliyah performed "One in a Million" on Live with Regis and Kathie Lee. Four days later on February 18, she performed the song on The Tonight Show with Jay Leno. On February 21, 1997 Aaliyah Performed "If Your girl Only Knew" and "One in a Million", on Showtime at the Apollo. Rap-Up included her Apollo performance as one of her 10 greatest live performances saying, "Let the fans charging towards the stage serve as your reminder that Aaliyah was the ultimate show-woman because she never skimped on the choreography. This 1996 performance mimics the music video to a tee—heavy-footed marching entrance and all—and she does it in gear that would inspire many boy banders."

In March, Aaliyah made an appearance at the annual MTV Spring Break event in Panama City, Florida. During the event, Aaliyah performed "One in a Million" and hosted a segment from The Grind, where she interviewed the Spice Girls before their performance. In August 1997 she performed "One in a Million" at KKBT 92.3 The Beat's annual Summer Jam concert at the Irvine Meadows Amphitheatre in Irvine, California. Cheo Hodari Coke from the Los Angeles Times praised her performance saying that she had "tight choreography, heartfelt vocals and enough platinum hits to delight the crowd." The Daily Bruin gave a more mixed review explaining that, "Aaliyah's vocals were right on the line with "4 Page Letter" and the rattling "One In A Million," but she might as well have sung from backstage with the uninspiring stage presence she quickly revealed. She may be a sexy video honey, but at the Jam, the attitude just wasn't there". In September 1997, Aaliyah performed the song on the Nickelodeon sketch comedy show All That.

== Impact ==
"One in a Million" was nominated for Best R&B/Soul Single – Female at the 1998 Soul Train Music Awards. According to Billboard, "One in a Million bridged often-juxtaposed worlds: The track is a gentle ballad over a tough beat, melding together rugged and smooth with ease. Across the song's 4:30 runtime, the trio joined forces to pioneer an unprecedented R&B lane, defined by its versatility". BET said, "The title track from Aaliyah's double-platinum sophomore album was more than just a successful step forward from her R. Kelly days." The publication also felt that "With its ethereal wah-wah guitars, quirky cricket samples and stuttering, drum and bass influenced drums that jumped from half-time to double-time, this was a quantum leap forward for R&B". Journalist Craig Seymour from The Buffalo News, stated that "One In a Million" "changed the sound of pop and R&B radio", and that "it's the reason that polyrhythmic smashes such as Christina Aguilera's "Genie in a Bottle" and Destiny's Child's "Say My Name" exist".

Writer Da'Shan Smith from Revolt, credits the song for creating the "Electro-Hop&B" sub-genre that was popular in the late 90s & 2000s. According to Smith, "The first to truly place her foot on the gas with the help of Virginia's finest was Aaliyah. In 1996, at Pyramid Studios in Ithaca, New York, the trio would record Aaliyah's titular track from her sophomore album, One In A Million. Unlike anything else on radio, "One In A Million" stood out for incorporating London's drum and bass electronic sound with slow-winding R&B synthesizers". Pitchfork ranked the song at number 36 on its "The 250 Best Songs of the 1990s" list.

== Track listings and formats ==
European maxi CD single and 12-inch vinyl

1. "One in a Million" (album version) – 4:31
2. "One in a Million" (remix featuring Ginuwine) – 5:07
3. "One in a Million" (instrumental) – 4:31
4. "One in a Million" (a cappella) – 4:31

Australian maxi CD single

1. "One in a Million" (album version) – 4:31
2. "One in a Million" (remix featuring Ginuwine) – 5:07
3. "One in a Million" (Dark Child Remix) – 4:42
4. "One in a Million" (Geoffrey C Edit) – 4:01
5. "One in a Million" (Nitebreed Bootleg Mix) – 7:15
6. "One in a Million" (Armand's Drum & Bass Mix) – 7:09

"If Your Girl Only Knew"/"One in a Million"

1. "If Your Girl Only Knew" (radio edit) – 3:55
2. "If Your Girl Only Knew" (The New Remix) – 4:58
3. "One in a Million" (Dark Child Remix) – 4:41
4. "One in a Million" (Armand's Drum & Bass Mix) – 7:11

"The One I Gave My Heart To"/"One in a Million"

1. "The One I Gave My Heart To" (Soul Solution club mix)
2. "The One I Gave My Heart To" (Soul Solution dub)
3. "One in a Million" (Nitebreed Mongolidic mix)
4. "One in a Million" (Geoffrey's House mix)
5. "One in a Million" (Armand's Drum & Bass mix)
6. "One in a Million" (Wolf-D Big Bass mix)
7. "One in a Million" (Nitebreed dub)

== Charts ==
=== Weekly charts ===
Chart (1996–1997)	Peak position
Australia (ARIA)	69
New Zealand (Recorded Music NZ)	11
Scottish Singles Sales (Official Charts) with "If Your Girl Only Knew"	85
UK Singles (Official Charts) with "If Your Girl Only Knew"	15
UK Dance (Official Charts) with "If Your Girl Only Knew"	5
UK Hip Hop/R&B (Official Charts) with "If Your Girl Only Knew"	4
US Radio Songs (Billboard)	25
US Dance Club Songs (Billboard)	2
US R&B/Hip-Hop Airplay (Billboard)	1
US Rhythmic Airplay (Billboard)	2

Chart (2021)	Peak position
US Digital Songs	7
US R&B Digital Song Sales	1

=== Year-end charts ===
Chart (1997)	Position
US Dance Club Play (Billboard)	35
US Hot R&B Airplay (Billboard)	10
US Rhythmic Top 40 (Billboard)	13

== Certifications ==
Region	Certification	Certified units/sales
New Zealand (RMNZ)	Gold	15,000^{‡}
United States (RIAA)	Gold	500,000^{‡}
^{‡} Sales+streaming figures based on certification alone.

== Release history ==
Release dates and formats for "One in a Million"
Region	Date	Format(s)	Label(s)	Ref.
United States	November 12, 1996	Rhythmic contemporary radio	Blackground; Atlantic	
United States	February 18, 1997	Contemporary hit radio	Blackground; Atlantic	
United Kingdom	April 28, 1997 (Note: In the United Kingdom, "One in a Million" was released as a double A-side single with "If Your Girl Only Knew".)	12-inch vinyl; cassette; maxi CD	Atlantic	
Australia	May 11, 1997	Maxi CD	Warner Music	
United States	April 14, 1998 (Note: In the United States, "One in a Million" was released as a double A-side single with "The One I Gave My Heart To".)	Maxi CD	Blackground; Atlantic	

== Bibliography ==
- Fairclough, Kristy; Halligan, Benjamin; Rambarran, Shara; Persley, Nicole Hodges (2023). Diva: Feminism and Fierceness from Pop to Hip-Hop. Bloomsbury Publishing. ISBN 9781501368257.
- Farley, Christopher John (2002). Aaliyah: More Than a Woman. Simon & Schuster. ISBN 0-7434-5566-5.
- Footman, Tim (2021). Aaliyah. Plexus Publishing Limited. ISBN 9780859657136.
- Reynolds, Simon (2011). Bring the Noise: 20 Years of Writing About Hip Rock and Hip Hop. Soft Skull Press. ISBN 9781593764609.
- Warner, Jennifer (2014). Aaliyah: A Biography. BookCap Study Guides. ISBN 9781629173597.
