= If Your Girl Only Knew =

Single by Aaliyah

from the album One in a Million
- A-side: "One in a Million"
- Released: July 15, 1996
- Recorded: 1996
- Studio: Pyramid (Ithaca, New York)
- Genre: Funk; pop; hip-hop
- Length: 4:50 (album version); 3:55 (radio edit); 8:03 (extended mix)
- Label: Blackground; Atlantic
- Songwriters: Melissa Elliott; Timothy Mosley
- Producer: Timbaland

Aaliyah singles chronology
"Live and Die for Hip Hop" (1996)	"If Your Girl Only Knew" (1996)	"Got to Give It Up" (1996)

Audio sample
- "If Your Girl Only Knew": file; help

Music video
- "If Your Girl Only Knew" on YouTube

"If Your Girl Only Knew" is a song by American singer Aaliyah. It was released to radio on July 15, 1996, by Blackground Records and Atlantic Records as the lead single for her second studio album, One in a Million (1996). It was physically released in August 1996. Written by both Missy Elliott and Timbaland, with the latter producing the song, it focuses on a guy who receives a scolding from the female narrator (Aaliyah) for hitting on her when he already has a girlfriend. Musically, "If Your Girl Only Knew" is a "bouncing" funk, pop and hip-hop song. Its production also incorporates other instruments ranging from keyboards, organs, and guitar licks.

Upon its release, the song received generally positive reviews from critics, with many praising Aaliyah's vocal performance and lyrical content. Commercially, "If Your Girl Only Knew" peaked at number 11 on the US Billboard Hot 100 chart and topped the Billboard Hot R&B Singles chart. By the end of 1996, it sold over 600,000 copies in the United States. Internationally, "If Your Girl Only Knew" was a moderate success, peaking within the top 40 in New Zealand and the United Kingdom. In 1997, the song was re-released with "One in a Million" in the UK, where it reached a new peak at number 15.

An accompanying music video for "If Your Girl Only Knew" was directed by Joseph Khan, and it depicts Aaliyah in a dark club setting. The video also featured cameo appearances from Lil' Kim, Missy Elliott, and other celebrities. Over the years, it has received critical acclaim, with many critics highlighting Aaliyah's new look in the video.

== Background and composition ==
While discussing the musical direction for One in a Million, Aaliyah stated in an interview with Billboard: "I wanted to maintain my smooth street musical image but wanted to be funky and hot yet sophisticated". "If Your Girl Only Knew" was described by Atlantic Records product development director Eddie Santiago as "a very funky mid-tempo track with lots of heavy keyboard and organ work along with live drums and a thumping bass line". The song was produced by Timbaland and was one of the earliest songs Aaliyah recorded with him for the album, alongside "One in a Million".

Musically, "If Your Girl Only Knew" is a funk and pop song, that has been described by critics as being "teasingly witchy" and "sassy". Quinn Peterson from Jet labeled it as a "bouncing" hip-hop record. The song also incorporates elements of drum and bass within its instrumental. Its production features a "slap bass melody over boom bap drums accentuated by hand claps over the snares and clattering cymbals and hi hats". In addition, it includes "retro" funk guitar licks and an organ that's prominent throughout the song.

On "If Your Girl Only Knew", Aaliyah "reveals a more assured and fully realized vocal style, as well as a more flexible note range". She utilizes her lower register more which is "stronger and full of seductive power", as she chides "a man for hitting on her when he already has a girlfriend". While analyzing the lyrics The Boombox said, "The content is raw, with melodies aplenty throughout, with key lyrics like 'She would probably leave you alone/She would probably curse you out and unplug her phone/I bet she'd be glad that you was gone/And then she wouldn't have to worry'". According to Quentin B. Huff from popmatters, "Aaliyah's narration isn't completely disinterested in his advances ("If your girl only knew / that I would want to kick it with you") but something tells me this guy is running the risk that she'll tell his girlfriend what's been going on". In their assessment, Complex considered the song "part ladies' anthem-I'm not going to help you cheat on you girl, part humble brag-I could have your man if I really wanted him".

== Release and promotion ==
Promotional single copies of "If Your Girl Only Knew" were serviced to urban contemporary radio on July 12, 1996, and the song was digitally uploaded to the stations on July 15. It was commercially released in the United States on August 13 as a 12-inch vinyl, cassette and maxi CD single by Blackground Records and Atlantic Records.

According to the Atlantic Records vice president Manny Bella, "Every component of the project – including the video, a television campaign, and other promotions – was in place before the single went to radio". In order to promote the single, Aaliyah went a promotional radio tour during which she connected with the radio audience, with Bella stating: "Aaliyah rode a tour bus through several markets and connected to radio in every one". Topics Aaliyah discussed while on radio included issues related to education; Blackground Records' president and Aaliyah's uncle Barry Hankerson stated: "While at the stations she discussed fundamental issues on air, such as getting good grades in school and how she balances school and her career".

In August 2021, it was reported that the album and Aaliyah's other recorded work for Blackground (since rebranded as Blackground Records 2.0) would be re-released on physical and digital formats in a deal between the label and Empire Distribution; it marked the first time most of Aaliyah's discography was being made available for streaming. One in a Million was reissued on August 20, 2021, despite Aaliyah's estate issuing a statement in response to Blackground 2.0's announcement, denouncing the "unscrupulous endeavor to release Aaliyah's music without any transparency or full accounting to the estate".

=== Live performances ===
In September 1996, Aaliyah made an appearance at MTV's sixth annual Rock N' Jock event, which aired on October 26. During the event, she participated in a celebrity basketball game and performed "If Your Girl Only Knew" during the half-time show. On October 11, 1996, Aaliyah performed the song on Soul Train. Rap-Up ranked her Soul Train performance as one of her 10 greatest live performances saying, "By both toying with and tempting her background dancers in this 1996 performance, Aaliyah was only further proving that she knew how to toe the line, between being provocative and playful, like a pro". On February 21, 1997, Aaliyah performed "If Your girl Only Knew" and "One in a Million", on Showtime at the Apollo.

== Critical reception ==
Oliver VanDervoort from AXS felt that "If Your Girl Only Knew" was one of Aaliyah's most sassiest songs, due to its lyrical content. In his review of the song, Larry Flick from Billboard described it as a "wickedly infectious jeep chugger" and felt that Aaliyah's break from public view in between albums was "well spent". He also praised Aaliyah's vocal styling, saying: "She reveals a more assured and fully realized vocal style as well as a more flexible note range". Peter Miro from Cash Box wrote, "Her bubble-bursting message is all the more meaningful given her soulfully rendered lyrics. Its arrangement makes effective use of pauses and refrains, making for a palatable, stand-alone ditty." Shannon Marcec from Complex felt that Aaliyah delivered her sweet but haunting vocals on one of Timbaland's best beats. Marcec also mentioned that the lyrics made the song one of Aaliyah's hottest songs. Dimitri Ehrlich of Entertainment Weekly described the song as a "low-key funk tune" and commended the overall message of the song, writing: "The message is an enduring one and the sparse, robotic rhythm is entrancing". Another writer from Entertertainment Weekly Brandon Caldwell, said "On "If Your Girl Only Knew," the singer brings a level of delight and tension; here, infidelity comes at a far greater warning than any heartbroken ballad ever could." Dave Sholin from the Gavin Report felt there's a lot of interest in any new Aaliyah project, since her fanbase has grown quickly, and that "This first single from her forthcoming album features the signature sound of a young super talent".

In a review of One in a Million, Connie Johnson of the Los Angeles Times called the song "teasingly witchy". Simon Price from Melody Maker wrote, "The coolest bit of her spookily mournful newie, when it all breaks down to voice, 808 bass and handclaps, is so glorious she chucks it in twice." A reviewer from Music Week gave it four out of five, naming it "the highlight track" from the album. Quentin B. Huff from PopMatters felt that on the song that "Aaliyah sounds amused, playful even, and if his girlfriend didn't already know about his shenanigans, I gotta believe she would have figured it out when she heard the song in heavy radio rotation (smirk). When you think about it that way, this is a nightmare for this guy, but funny for us -- he tries to "kick it" with Aaliyah and gets his attempt at being a player broadcast in one of her songs". In a retrospective review by Billboard, the publication praised Aaliyah's vocal delivery stating, "Singing in a guttural register and sounding more self-assured than ever, Aaliyah's verses should make the grown man at the other end cower, but a flirtatious streak runs through her teasing when she sings lines like If your girl only knew/ That I would want to kick it with you." Variety writers praised Aaliyah's voice saying that her "vocals, combined with Timbaland's drum-heavy production combine with guitar licks and pipe-organ interjections to provide a timeless, funkadelic touch".

== Commercial performance ==
"If Your Girl Only Knew" debuted on the US Billboard Hot 100 at number 34 during the week of August 31, 1996. The song reached its peak at number 11 eight weeks later on the chart dated October 19. On the Hot R&B Singles chart, the song debuted at number 12 the week of August 31. On September 28, it reached its peak at number one, remaining atop the chart for two consecutive weeks. According to Datu Faison from Billboard, "Key factors leading to Aaliyah's big 5–1 leap include a 20% unit increase at R&B core stores, which pushes an identical 5–1 jump on hot R&B singles sales. Audience impressions increase another 9%, moving the record 9–7 on Hot R&B airplay". The song also peaked at number six on the Top 40/Rhytym-Crossover chart during the week of November 2. Towards the end of 1996, it was reported by Billboard that the single had sold over 600,000 copies in the United States.

Internationally, "If Your Girl Only Knew" originally peaked at number 21 on the UK Singles Chart on August 24, 1996. In 1997, the single was re-released as a double A-side single with "One in a Million" and reached a new peak position at number 15 on May 24, 1997. The song also peaked at number six on the UK Dance Chart on August 18, 1996, and at number four on the UK R&B Chart on August 25, 1996. According to the Official Charts Company (OCC), the "If Your Girl Only Knew" standalone single is Aaliyah's tenth best-selling single in the United Kingdom, while the double single is her sixth. "If Your Girl Only Knew" also peaked at number 20 in New Zealand on October 20, 1996.

Following its 2021 digital release, "If Your Girl Only Knew" debuted at number 15 on the US Digital Song Sales chart for the week of September 4, 2021.

== Music video ==
=== Background ===
The music video for "If Your Girl Only Knew", directed by South Korean-American film and music video director Joseph Kahn, was sent to local and national video shows on July 8, 1996. The video featured cameos from celebrities such as Missy Elliott, Timbaland, 702, Lil' Kim and Aaliyah's brother Rashad Haughton. In an interview with Vibe, Kameelah Williams from 702 recalled that either Aaliyah or Elliott invited the group to be a part of the video. According to Williams, she and her bandmates were told they would be riding on motorcycles and that they had to wear all-black outfits. Williams also had a solo cameo in the video, in which she is shown arguing with her on-screen boyfriend in an elevator. Williams explained: "She gave me a little cameo so I was like, 'Okay, that's my home girl.' She let me do a little scene by myself with this guy fighting in the elevator so that was my little Aaliyah cameo".

=== Synopsis ===
In her biography Aaliyah: A Biography (2014) author Jennifer Warner said, "Kahn retained Aaliyah's trademark look of dark sunglasses and bandana and outfitted her in dark letter". The video begins with Aaliyah, her brother, and their clique arriving to a party on motorcycles. She wears a dark leather outfit with her trademark sunglasses and bandana. Scenes include Aaliyah sitting in a futuristic chair, at a party (the party scene is shot in black-and-white, but Aaliyah remains in color), Aaliyah and various others in an elevator, and also a close-up of Aaliyah's face. Color editing is used on her eyes here, and they change color towards the end of the video.

=== Release and reception ===
The music video for "If Your Girl Only Knew" made its television debut on BET for the week ending July 21, 1996 and August 3 on The Box. Eventually, the video was the 16th most-played video on BET for the week ending September 8, 1996. On MTV, the video made its television debut on the network for the week ending July 28, 1996. For the week ending October 6, 1996, the video was the 28th most-played video on MTV. Nylon writer Steffanee Wang said, "Aaliyah breaks it down at a grimy–looking club. and if you don't know where to look, she's made it easy for you: all irrelevant's are greyed out in black-and-white."

== Legacy ==
In 1999, rapper and beatboxer Rahzel released "If Your Mother Only Knew", a track on his album Make the Music 2000, interpolating sections of "If Your Girl Only Knew".

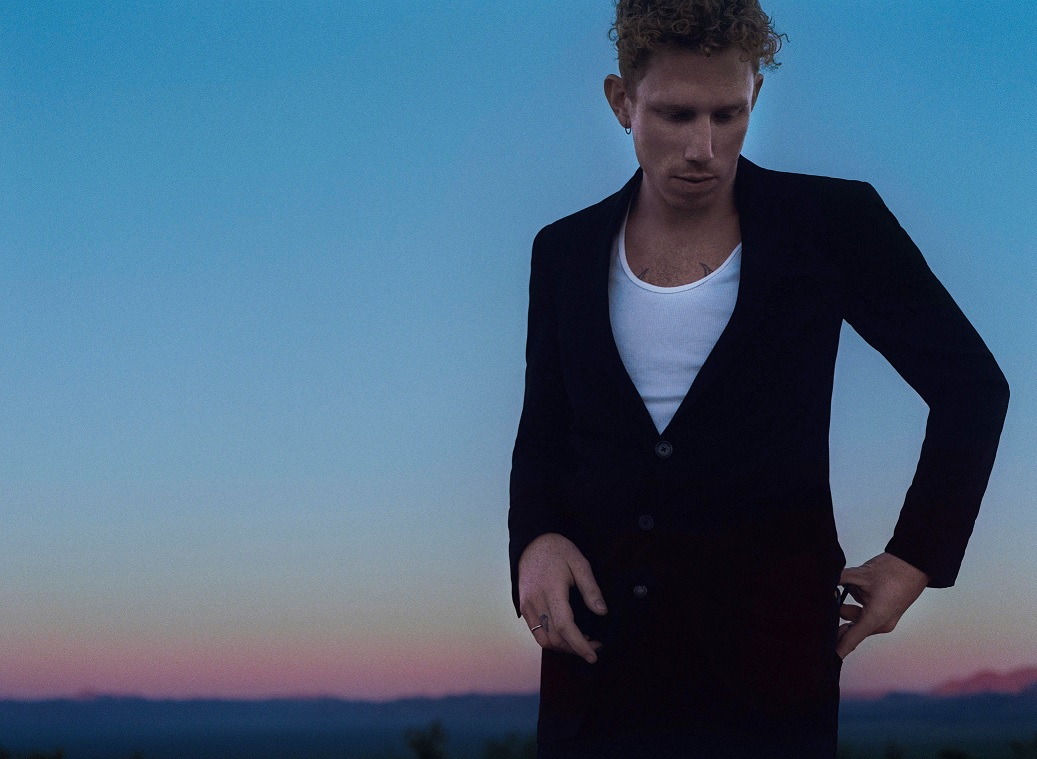
Erik Hassle (pictured) paid tribute to Aaliyah with his own version of "If Your Girl Only Knew".

"If Your Girl Only Knew" was featured in the sports comedy-drama film Varsity Blues (1999). In 2016, Swedish singer-songwriter Erik Hassle paid tribute to Aaliyah by releasing his own version of the song, entitled "If Your Man Only Knew". "If Your Man Only Knew" was written by Hassle, Daniel Ledinsky and Alexander Shuckburgh. According to Brennan Carley from Spin, "Hassle also knows his way around a solo hook too, and his new song "If Your Man Only Knew" is gorgeous proof. At ends both melancholic and resentful, the tune's a big, bold, front-and-center vocal showcase for the singer". Both Lewis Corner and Amy Davidson from Digital Spy praised the song by saying "it's a cool slice of R&B-pop" and that the song would do well in the contemporary music climate.

The University of Miami football team recorded a sexually explicit rap song, "7th Floor Crew", set to the instrumental of "If Your Girl Only Knew", which leaked in 2005 and featured future NFL players Greg Olsen and Jon Beason. This led to criticism and controversy.

In September 2025, English DJ and producer Ben Hemsley released the single "If Your Girl", a dance track that heavily interpolates the chorus and bassline from "If Your Girl Only Knew"; the single debuted at number 12 on the UK Singles Downloads Chart, and at number 20 on the Official Trending Chart Top 20.

== Track listings and formats ==
- US and Japanese maxi CD single
1. "If Your Girl Only Knew" (album version) – 4:50
2. "If Your Girl Only Knew" (extended mix) – 8:03
3. "If Your Girl Only Knew" (remix) – 4:43
4. "If Your Girl Only Knew" (Beat A Pella) – 4:50
5. "If Your Girl Only Knew" (instrumental) – 4:42
- US 12-inch vinyl
1. "If Your Girl Only Knew" (album version) – 4:50
2. "If Your Girl Only Knew" (extended mix) – 8:03
3. "If Your Girl Only Knew" (The New Remix) – 4:58
4. "If Your Girl Only Knew" (remix) – 4:43
5. "If Your Girl Only Knew" (Beat A Pella) – 4:50
6. "If Your Girl Only Knew" (instrumental) – 4:42
- European 12-inch vinyl and maxi CD single and Australian maxi CD single
1. "If Your Girl Only Knew" (radio edit) – 3:55
2. "If Your Girl Only Knew" (extended mix) – 8:03
3. "If Your Girl Only Knew" (Beat A Pella) – 4:50
4. "If Your Girl Only Knew" (instrumental) – 4:42
5. "If Your Girl Only Knew" (a cappella) – 4:27
- French CD single
1. "If Your Girl Only Knew" (radio edit) – 3:55
2. "If Your Girl Only Knew" (extended mix) – 8:03
3. "If Your Girl Only Knew" (instrumental) – 4:42
4. "If Your Girl Only Knew" (The New Remix) – 4:58
- "If Your Girl Only Knew" / "One in a Million"
1. "If Your Girl Only Knew" (radio edit) – 3:55
2. "If Your Girl Only Knew" (The New Remix) – 4:58
3. "One in a Million" (Dark Child Remix) – 4:41
4. "One in a Million" (Armand's Drum & Bass Mix) – 7:11

== Charts ==
=== Weekly charts ===
Weekly chart performance for "If Your Girl Only Knew"
Chart (1996)	Peak position
Canada (Nielsen Soundscan)	40
New Zealand (Recorded Music NZ)	20
Scottish Singles Sales (Official Charts)	93
Sweden (Sverigetopplistan)	49
UK Singles (Official Charts)	21
UK Dance (Official Charts)	6
UK Hip Hop/R&B (Official Charts)	4
US Billboard Hot 100	11
US Dance Singles Sales (Billboard)	5
US Hot R&B/Hip-Hop Songs (Billboard)	1
US Rhythmic Airplay (Billboard)	6
US Cash Box Top 100	6

Chart (2021)	Peak position
US R&B Digital Song Sales	2

Weekly chart performance for "If Your Girl Only Knew" / "One in a Million"
Chart (1997)	Peak position
Scottish Singles Sales (Official Charts)	85
UK Singles (Official Charts)	15
UK Dance (Official Charts)	5
UK Hip Hop/R&B (Official Charts)	4

=== Year-end charts ===
Chart (1996)	Position
US Billboard Hot 100	69
US Hot R&B Singles (Billboard)	36
US Maxi-Singles Sales (Billboard)	48
US Top 40/Rhythm-Crossover (Billboard)	35

== Certifications and sales ==
Region	Certification	Certified units/sales
United States	—	600,000

== Release history ==
Release dates and formats for "If Your Girl Only Knew"
Region	Date	Format(s)	Label(s)	Ref.
United States	July 15, 1996	Urban contemporary radio	Blackground; Atlantic	
United States	July 23, 1996	Rhythmic contemporary radio	Blackground; Atlantic	
United Kingdom	August 12, 1996	12-inch vinyl; cassette; maxi CD	Atlantic	
United States	August 13, 1996	12-inch vinyl; cassette; maxi CD	Blackground; Atlantic	
Germany	August 16, 1996	Maxi CD	Warner Music	
France	September 6, 1996	Maxi CD	Warner Music	
United States	September 10, 1996	Contemporary hit radio	Blackground; Atlantic	
Japan	September 10, 1996	Maxi CD	Warner Music	
France	October 11, 1996	CD	Warner Music	
United Kingdom	April 28, 1997 (Note: In the United Kingdom, "If Your Girl Only Knew" was re-released as a double A-side single with "One in a Million" in April 1997.)	12-inch vinyl; cassette; maxi CD	Atlantic	

== See also ==
- List of number-one R&B singles of 1996 (U.S.)

== Bibliography ==
- Danois, Ericka Blount (August 1, 2013). Love, Peace, and Soul: Behind the Scenes of America's Favorite Dance Show Soul Train: Classic Moments. Hal Leonard Corporation. ISBN 978-1-4803-6398-4.
- Warner, Jennifer (2014). Aaliyah: A Biography. BookCap Study Guides. ISBN 9781629173597.
