= The One I Gave My Heart To =

1997 single by Aaliyah

Single by Aaliyah

from the album One in a Million
- A-side: "Hot Like Fire"; "One in a Million"
- B-side: "Death of a Playa"
- Released: August 25, 1997
- Recorded: 1996; 1997 (Note: The original version of "The One I Gave My Heart To" was recorded in 1996, while the single and video version was recorded in 1997.)
- Genre: Pop; R&B
- Length: 4:30 (album version); 4:24 (video version); 3:53 (radio mix)
- Label: Blackground; Atlantic
- Songwriter: Diane Warren
- Producers: Daryl Simmons; Guy Roche (Note: Daryl Simmons produced the album version of "The One I Gave My Heart To", while Guy Roche produced the single version.)

Aaliyah singles chronology
"Up Jumps da Boogie" (1997)	"The One I Gave My Heart To" (1997)	"Hot Like Fire" (1997)

Music video
- "The One I Gave My Heart To" on YouTube

"The One I Gave My Heart To" is a song recorded by American singer Aaliyah for her second studio album One in a Million (1996). The song was written by Diane Warren and was produced by Daryl Simmons. Musically, it is a pop and R&B power ballad with Aaliyah utilizing her soprano tone. Lyrically, the song is about the protagonist asking how the person that she loved could break her heart. The song was released as the fifth and final single from One in a Million with "Hot Like Fire" on September 16, 1997, by Blackground Records and Atlantic Records.

Upon its release, "The One I Gave My Heart To" was met with generally positive reviews from critics, with many praising Aaliyah's vocal delivery and tone on the record. Commercially, "The One I Gave My Heart To" performed well, peaking at number nine on the US Billboard Hot 100 and at number eight on the Hot R&B/Hip-Hop Songs. It has also been certified gold by the Recording Industry Association of America (RIAA), selling over 900,000 copies in the United States.

== Background and production ==
The song came into fruition when songwriter Diane Warren expressed interest in working with Aaliyah, with Warren later saying: "I remember really liking Aaliyah and wanting to work with her." Eventually, Warren reached out to Atlantic Records chairman Craig Kallman to express her wish of working with Aaliyah and Kallman agreed to the collaboration. Her goal in working with Aaliyah was to have her do a certain song that she would not have normally done to showcase a different side of her, which included displaying her vocal range in a different way than what she was used to doing. Once Warren was on board, producer Babyface was chosen to produce the song. Due to unforeseen circumstances, however, he was unable to complete the work, so he enlisted producer Daryl Simmons to replace him instead. Simmons would go on to produce the album version of the song, while pop producer Guy Roche would go on to produce the single version.

== Music and lyrics ==
Written by Diane Warren, "The One I Gave My Heart To" is a pop and R&B power ballad. The song is composed in the key of G major and is set in time signature of common time with a tempo of 72 beats per minute. Aaliyah's vocal range on the song spans from G♯_{3} to D♯_{5}. It also follows the verse-chorus form with Aaliyah doing improvisations at the ad-libbed last verse, marking the climax of the song. In her biography Aaliyah: A Biography (2014) author Jennifer Warner mentioned, that "Aaliyah abandoned her typical falsetto to deliver the power pop ballad, to the approval of Warren". Warren spoke highly of Aaliyah's vocal performance, stating that "She could go where the Whitneys went. She wailed on that single I wrote for her. I write songs that challenge singers, and she rose to the occasion." Lyrically, Aaliyah is "highlighting a broken heart and sense of betrayal". Warner further explained the songs lyrics saying, " "The One I Gave My Heart To" is a contrasting ballad of lament as Aaliyah wonders how she could have given her heart to a man who turned out to be such a cad."

== Critical reception ==
Oliver VanDervoort from AXS said that "The One I Gave My Heart To" "was actually quite a bit more "poppy" than some of her other romantic entries but she made it work for sure." Ed Masley from AZCentral, felt "The production goes a bit too heavy on the schmaltz but the vocals are emotional enough to rise above it". In his review of "The One I Gave My Heart To", Larry Flick from Billboard felt that the song was a strong top-40 contender and that it would "rise to the top" on a variety of radio formats. He also praised both Aaliyah's vocal styling and the overall production of the song, saying: "She brings an engaging, youthful romance to a sweet Diane Warren composition which is fleshed out with a careful balance of straight ahead pop and R&B sensibilities in producer Guy Roche's instrumental arrangement". While reviewing One In a Million, Peter Miro from Cash Box praised the song for its crossover appeal saying,"The One I Gave My Heart To, is a bonus cut that adds to the R&B, pop, urban & churban playability of this deceptively oozing talent.

According to Edwin Ortiz from Complex, Aaliyah proved that she could "switch from her usual mid-tempo style and deliver an incredible vocal performance". He also felt that she "brought the song to life through her smooth soprano vocals, highlighting a broken heart and sense of betrayal, with the accompanying video perfectly depicting her emotional state". Jordan Simon from Idotaltor said, on "The One I Gave My Heart To,” the album’s final single, the teenager confirmed what others close to her already knew: she was capable of delivering a vocal performance that would make the era’s dominating divas Whitney Houston and Celine Dion proud." In his "Talking Music" column, Music Week's Alan Jones described the song as "Warren's typically stately MOR/pop ballad" and that along with "Hot Like Fire" were both "fabulous showcases for her". While briefly discussing the song, Stereogum writer Tom Breihan described the song as a "pretty-but-pedestrian Diane Warren ballad". Georgette Cline from The Boombox felt that Aaliyah allowed her "vulnerability to be exposed" on the song. Variety writers felt that "With teenage love comes teenage heartbreak, and when you combine that with songwriting ace Diane Warren, it adds up to a power ballad". They also praised the song because it showcased Aaliyah's "ability to hit higher notes and display vulnerability".

== Commercial performance ==
In the United States, "The One I Gave My Heart To" debuted on the Billboard Hot 100 issued October 4, 1997 at number 24. It reached its peak at number nine in its seventh week, making it the highest-charting single from One in a Million. The song debuted at number 18 on the Hot R&B/Hip-Hop Songs on October 4, reaching the top ten at number eight on December 6. The song also peaked within the top ten on the Rhythmic chart, at number eight, on November 15. On the Dance Club Songs, the song peaked at number 18 on February 28, 1998. "The One I Gave My Heart To" was certified gold by the Recording Industry Association of America (RIAA) for shipments of 500,000 units, on October 21, 1997. By the end of 1997, the single had sold over 900,000 copies in the US.

Internationally, the song was a moderate success, peaking at number 30 on the UK Singles Chart on November 23, 1997. In the United Kingdom, the song also peaked at number 25 on the dance chart, and at number three on the R&B chart. Elsewhere in Europe, "The One I Gave My Heart To" peaked at number 16 on the Dutch Tipparade chart on February 6, 1998. In New Zealand, the song peaked at number 28 on December 7, 1997.

== Music video ==
The accompanying music video for "The One I Gave My Heart To" was directed by Darren Grant, and uses the single version of the song, keeping the second half of the first verse, which was normally cut for radio airplay. Throughout the video, there are two main settings and another one at the end. In one setting, Aaliyah is inside a house with wooden floors and walls. In the house, there is a room with nothing but a mirror on the floor. With this mirror, Aaliyah is able to see other scenes of the video. The second shows Aaliyah sitting on wooden bench in a forest setting. In the final scene, Aaliyah performs outside during a rain shower.

=== Release and reception ===
The music video for "The One I Gave My Heart To" made its television debut on MTV during the week of September 14, 1997. During the week of September 28, the video made its debut on BET. The video became the 22nd most-played video on MTV during the week of November 2, 1997. Meanwhile, it became the 19th most-played video on BET during the week of December 14, 1997. Nylon writer Steffanee Wang praised the video saying, "Everything you could want in an R&B ballad music video are checked in this one". Author Kathy Iandoli felt in comparison to Aaliyah's previous videos, that it "was more subdued than the others but still stylish."

== Live performances ==
On October 6, 1997, Aaliyah performed "The One I Gave My Heart To", on The Keenen Ivory Wayans Show. Thirteen days later, she performed "The One I Gave My Heart To" at Nickelodeon's fourth annual The Big Help event in Santa Monica, California. On November 26, 1997, she performed "The One I Gave My Heart To" on the BET show Planet Groove. On December 10, Aaliyah performed "The One I Gave My Heart To" at the UNICEF Gift of Song benefit gala, which aired live on TNT. In 1998, Aaliyah co-headlined the B-96 B-Bash, hosted by Chicago radio station B96; during the event, she performed "The One I Gave My Heart To".

== Track listings and formats ==
US and UK maxi CD single and US 12-inch vinyl

1. "The One I Gave My Heart To" (radio mix) – 3:54
2. "Hot Like Fire" (album version) – 4:23
3. "Hot Like Fire" (Timbaland's Groove mix) (featuring Timbaland) – 4:35
4. "Hot Like Fire" (Feel My Horns mix) – 4:37
5. "Hot Like Fire" (instrumental) – 4:22
6. "Death of a Playa" (featuring Rashad Haughton) – 4:53

US cassette and CD singles

1. "The One I Gave My Heart To" (radio mix) – 3:53
2. "Hot Like Fire" (album version) – 4:23

"The One I Gave My Heart To"/"One in a Million"

1. "The One I Gave My Heart To" (Soul Solution club mix)
2. "The One I Gave My Heart To" (Soul Solution dub)
3. "One in a Million" (Nitebreed Mongolidic mix)
4. "One in a Million" (Geoffrey's House mix)
5. "One in a Million" (Armand's Drum n' Bass mix)
6. "One in a Million" (Wolf-D Big Bass mix)
7. "One in a Million" (Nitebreed dub)

== Charts ==
=== Weekly charts ===
Chart (1997–1998)	Peak position
Canada (Nielsen SoundScan)	65
Netherlands (Dutch Top 40 Tipparade)	16
Netherlands (Single Top 100)	74
New Zealand (Recorded Music NZ)	28
Scottish Singles Sales (Official Charts) with "Hot Like Fire"	88
UK Singles (Official Charts) with "Hot Like Fire"	30
UK Dance (Official Charts) with "Hot Like Fire"	25
UK Hip Hop/R&B (Official Charts) with "Hot Like Fire"	3
US Billboard Hot 100	9
US Dance Club Songs (Billboard)	18
US Dance Singles Sales (Billboard)	6
US Hot R&B/Hip-Hop Songs (Billboard)	8
US Rhythmic Airplay (Billboard)	8

Chart (2021)	Peak position
US R&B Digital Song Sales	11

=== Year-end charts ===
Chart (1997)	Position
US Billboard Hot 100	78
US Hot R&B/Hip-Hop Songs (Billboard)	73
US Rhythmic (Billboard)	59

Chart (1998)	Position
US Billboard Hot 100	86
US Hot R&B/Hip-Hop Songs (Billboard)	83
US Rhythmic (Billboard)	95

== Certifications and sales ==
Region	Certification	Certified units/sales
United States (RIAA)	Gold	900,000

== Release history ==
Release dates and formats for "The One I Gave My Heart To"
Region	Date	Format(s)	Label(s)	Ref.
United States	August 25, 1997	Urban contemporary radio	Blackground; Atlantic	
United States	August 26, 1997	Contemporary hit radio	Blackground; Atlantic	
United States	September 16, 1997 (Note: On physical formats, "The One I Gave My Heart To" was originally released as a double A-side single with "Hot Like Fire".)	12-inch vinyl; cassette; CD; maxi CD	Blackground; Atlantic	
United Kingdom	October 27, 1997	12-inch vinyl; cassette; CD	Atlantic	
United States	April 14, 1998 (Note: In the United States, "The One I Gave My Heart To" was re-released as a double A-side single with "One in a Million".)	Maxi CD	Blackground; Atlantic	

== Bibliography ==
- Iandoli, Kathy (2021). Baby Girl: Better Known as Aaliyah. Atria Books. ISBN 978-1982156862.
- Warner, Jennifer (2014). Aaliyah: A Biography. BookCap Study Guides. ISBN 9781629173597.
