= Black Barbies (song) =

Promotional single by Nicki Minaj and Mike Will Made It
- Released: November 30, 2016
- Recorded: November 2016
- Genre: Hip hop; trap
- Length: 4:14
- Label: EarDrummers; Interscope
- Songwriters: Onika Maraj; Khalif Brown; Aaquil Brown; Radric Davis; Michael Williams
- Producer: Mike Will Made It

"Black Barbies" is a song by rapper Nicki Minaj and producer Mike Will Made It. It is a remix of the song "Black Beatles", which was originally produced by Mike Will Made It and performed by Rae Sremmurd featuring Gucci Mane. An unmixed version of the song was initially released to SoundCloud by Minaj on November 15, 2016. "Black Barbies" was later mixed and released officially for digital purchase on November 30, 2016. "Black Barbies" interpolates Aaliyah's 1997 single "Hot Like Fire", with the "oh no, no, no, no" line.

Rolling Stone's Rob Sheffield ranked the single 49 on his list of the 50 best songs of 2016.

The song later would become viral on the video sharing app TikTok in June 2021, with people lip-syncing the lyrics.

== Charts ==
Chart (2016)	Peak position
Australia (ARIA)	47
Australian Urban (ARIA)	8
Canada Hot 100 (Billboard)	78
New Zealand Heatseekers (RMNZ)	1
Scotland Singles (OCC)	64
UK Hip Hop/R&B (OCC)	25
US Billboard Hot 100	65
US Hot Rap Songs (Billboard)	20

== Certifications ==
Certifications for "Black Barbies"
Region	Certification	Certified units/sales
Australia (ARIA)	Gold	35,000^{‡}
^{‡} Sales+streaming figures based on certification alone.
