= Hot Like Fire =

Single by Aaliyah featuring Timbaland

from the album One in a Million
- A-side: "The One I Gave My Heart To"
- B-side: "Death of a Playa"
- Released: September 16, 1997
- Recorded: 1996; 1997 (Note: The original version of "Hot Like Fire" was recorded in 1996, while Timbaland's Groove Mix–used for the music video and included on the single releases–was recorded in 1997.)
- Studio: Pyramid (Ithaca)
- Genre: Trip hop (album version); funk (Timbaland's Groove Mix)
- Length: 4:24 (album version); 4:35 (Timbaland's Groove Mix)
- Label: Blackground; Atlantic
- Songwriters: Missy Elliott; Tim Mosley
- Producer: Timbaland

Aaliyah singles chronology
"The One I Gave My Heart To" (1997)	"Hot Like Fire" (1997)	"Journey to the Past" (1998)

Timbaland singles chronology
"What About Us" (1997)	"Hot Like Fire" (1997)	"Are You That Somebody?" (1998)

Music video
- "Hot Like Fire" on YouTube

"Hot Like Fire" is a song recorded by American singer Aaliyah for her second studio album One in a Million (1996). The song was written by both Missy Elliott and Timbaland, with the latter producing the song. In 1997 it was re-recorded and released as the fifth and final single from One in a Million with "The One I Gave My Heart To" on September 16, 1997 by Blackground Records and Atlantic Records.

Musically, the album version is a trip hop song, while the single remix version is a "jeep-friendly" funk song with a bouncing beat and features ad-libs from Timbaland. Lyrically, the song is sexually suggestive, with the narrator (Aaliyah) promising a potential lover that she is worth the wait.

Upon its release, the song was met with generally positive reviews from critics, with many praising both Aaliyah's vocal delivery and the song's production. In the United States, "Hot Like Fire" barely charted on any of the major Billboard charts, being largely overshadowed by its A-side "The One I Gave My Heart To"; it peaked at number 31 on the US R&B/Hip-Hop Airplay chart. Internationally, the song peaked at number 30 on the UK Singles Chart.

An accompanying video for "Hot Like Fire" was directed by Lance "Un" Rivera. The video depicts Aaliyah in a red themed party setting. It features cameo appearances from Timbaland, Missy Elliott, Lil' Kim, and other celebrities. It received critical acclaim, with many critics noting that the video helped bring the song to life.

== Music and lyrics ==
"Hot like Fire" was described as "sleek" "fine trip hop" and it is a "panting minimalist controlled-blaze baby-maker" with suggestive lyrics. The production on the song's 1997 single release differs from the album version and it has a "more jeep-friendly beat". According to Emily Manning from i-D, the songs remix "features a sizzling, soulful, and bouncing beat (plus an ad-lib Tim ripped from Suzanne Vega's "Tom's Diner")". Billboard further discussed the remix saying, "Timb’s club-ready remix, which jacks up the bounce of the original track, layers on a dose of funk and essentially sets the whole thing ablaze". The songs remix also incorporates UK electronic genres such as jungle and downtempo.

On "Hot Like Fire", Aaliyah "hums and moans promises to her new bae that his patience will be rewarded". Delivering the lines "I know you've been wait, you've been waitin a long time for me/But if you wait a little while longer, this is how it'll be", Aaliyah promises to be "hot and ready for her patient lover on this enticing opening offering". According to Bob Waliszewski's review on the website Focus on the Family, the song "celebrates passionate sex-without suggesting a marital context".

In his biography Aaliyah (2021) author Tim Footman, compared the songs lyrics to the content from her debut album Age Ain't Nothing but a Number (1994). According to footman, "With the more sexually explicit tracks on the debut album, the listener was painfully aware of a young girl mouthing grown-up sentiments. But here, lyrics like 'Ya got me meltin' like a sundae' sound sexy rather than sordid." He concluded his assessment saying, "this is a young woman in love with life, feeling the first flushes of passion at its most intense."

== Critical reception ==
Shannon Marcec from Complex felt that the re-recorded remix version of "Hot Like Fire" was better than the original version, stating: "No shade to the original version of "Hot Like Fire," but the "Timbaland's Groove Mix" was 10 times better". Marcec also praised both the song's production and Aaliyah's vocals, saying: "Timbaland presents another entrancing track, beatboxing Susanne Vega's "Tom's Diner," while Aaliyah brings her melodic voice and habitually sexy style". Bianca Gracie from Fuse also felt the remix was better than the original version, also saying that Timbaland "added his magic hip-hop-infused touch to the steamy track, which was anchored by Aaliyah's laidback vocals". Dean Van Nguyen from The Independent said, on "Hot Life Fire, Aaliyah fully emerges on the horizon, her voice cutting through the atmospherics and seeping into your ears." Bob Waliszewski of Plugged In, a publication of the Christian conservative organization Focus on the Family, was less enthusiastic in his review of One in a Million, writing that the sexually suggestive lyrics of "Hot Like Fire" "spoil whatever good this disc has going for it". In his "Talking Music" column, Music Week's Alan Jones described the song as "Elliott's urban groove" and that along with "The One I Gave My Heart To" both were "fabulous showcases for her".

== Commercial performance ==
Released simultaneously with "The One I Gave My Heart To", "Hot Like Fire" didn't chart on any of the major Billboard charts–with the exception of the US R&B/Hip-Hop Airplay chart, where it peaked at number 31 on August 16, 1997. After the 2021 rerelease of One In a Million, the Timbaland's Groove Mix remix of "Hot Like Fire" charted at number 9 on the US R&B Digital Songs Sales chart.

Internationally, the song performed moderately, peaking at number 30 on the UK Singles Chart on November 22, 1997. The song also peaked at number 25 on the UK Dance Chart on November 16, 1997, and at number three on the UK R&B Chart on November 23, 1997.

== Music video ==
=== Synopsis ===
The accompanying music video for "Hot Like Fire" was directed by Lance "Un" Rivera; Fatima Robinson orchestrated the choreography. Missy Elliott, Timbaland, Magoo, Changing Faces, Lil' Kim, and Junior M.A.F.I.A. all make cameos in the video. The video begins with a large group of people in an urban neighborhood setting, sitting outside on a hot day. Also, in the scene, Aaliyah is shown driving a red car while fire trucks are soaring down the street trailing behind her. The setting quickly changes to nighttime, with Aaliyah performing the chorus on a steamy stage filled with red lights and pyrotechnics in the background. During the second verse, Aaliyah is dancing in the crowd. In the remaining scenes of the video, Aaliyah is on stage with her dancers, performing the song's chorus. Timbaland and Elliott are also on stage performing their ad-lib-filled verses.

=== Fashion ===
For the video, Aaliyah wore red camo cargo pants that were custom-made by 5001 Flavors. According to her former stylist Derek Lee "Her look was really supposed to be about the pants and her swag, so the top needed to be very, very simple". He continued saying, "She has Jamaican blood and I've always been a fan of dancehall music, so you see her rocking two different colored Clark Wallabees, because Wallabees were huge in dancehall. I always wanted to pull that into it."

=== Release and reception ===
The music video for "Hot Like Fire" made its television debut on BET during the week ending August 17, 1997. On August 24, 1997, the video debuted on MTV and September 6 on The Box. The video became the eighth most-played video on BET during the week of September 21, 1997. Emily Manning from i-D felt that the music video was "underappreciated" considering the video's star-studded cameos; she also mentioned that the video "features peak Aaliyah street style: rose-tinted shades and baggy camo cargos". Tatiana Cirisano from Billboard, felt the music video pulled the song together and that "the whole crew — Missy, Aaliyah and Timb — pull up in a firetruck, inciting a bumping block party full of both literal and metaphorical flames". Nylon writer Steffanee Wang thought that after getting "freed" from R. Kelly and joining forces with Timbaland Aaliyah's "sound and visuals got a boost of energy, which you can visually see in this choreography-heavy video.

== Live performances ==
In August 1997, Aaliyah made a televised appearance on the short-lived talk show Vibe, where she performed "Hot Like Fire" and gave the show's host a gift basket full of promotional items. Also in 1997 she performed the song at Hot 97FM's annual Summer Jam concert festival. In her biography Aaliyah: A Biography (2014), author Jennifer Warner says of the performance, "At Summer Jam, Aaliyah gave notice that she was not looking to be a singer but was a performer". Warner further explained, "she took the stage in the midst of explosions and confetti showers and confidently held the stage with more than a dozen dancers".

== Legacy ==
In 2013, American R&B singer Solange and British indie pop group The xx covered "Hot Like Fire" at the Coachella Valley Music and Arts Festival. Bassist Oliver Sim sang the first verse of the song while his fellow group member Romy Madley Croft backed him in the performance. Solange came out during the performance in a "bright white tank top and fluorescent pink skirt" to join The xx. Jeff Benjamin from Fuse praised the performance, saying: "Solange's sweet vocals sounded right at home on The xx-ified version of Aaliyah's track. And it was so clear Solange was having fun as she danced around on stage, giggling into the mic and flailed her arms about". Their cover of the song was a nod to the group's modern R&B roots that are infused in their "stripped down sound". In 2016, rapper Nicki Minaj interpolated "Hot Like Fire" in her song "Black Barbies" with the "oh no, no, no, no" line.

== Track listings and formats ==
US cassette and CD singles

1. "The One I Gave My Heart To" (radio edit) – 3:53
2. "Hot Like Fire" (album version) – 4:22

US 12-inch vinyl and maxi CD single

1. "The One I Gave My Heart To" (radio edit) – 3:53
2. "Hot Like Fire" (album version) – 4:22
3. "Hot Like Fire" (Timbaland's Groove Mix) (featuring Timbaland) – 4:35
4. "Hot Like Fire" (Feel My Horns Mix) – 4:35
5. "Hot Like Fire" (instrumental) – 4:19
6. "Death of a Playa" (featuring Rashad Haughton) – 4:53

European maxi CD single

1. "The One I Gave My Heart To" (radio edit) – 3:53
2. "Hot Like Fire" (Timbaland's Groove Mix) (featuring Timbaland) – 4:35
3. "Hot Like Fire" (Feel My Horns Mix) – 4:35

European cassette single

1. "The One I Gave My Heart To" (radio edit) – 3:53
2. "Hot Like Fire" (Timbaland's Groove Mix) (featuring Timbaland) – 4:35

UK 12-inch vinyl

1. "The One I Gave My Heart To" (radio edit) – 3:53
2. "Hot Like Fire" (Timbaland's Groove Mix) (featuring Timbaland) – 4:35
3. "Hot Like Fire" (Feel My Horns Mix) – 4:35
4. "Hot Like Fire" (instrumental) – 4:19

== Charts ==
Weekly chart performance for "Hot Like Fire"
Chart (1997–1998)	Peak position
Scottish Singles Sales (Official Charts) with "The One I Gave My Heart To"	88
UK Singles (Official Charts) with "The One I Gave My Heart To"	30
UK Dance (Official Charts) with "The One I Gave My Heart To"	25
UK Hip Hop/R&B (Official Charts) with "The One I Gave My Heart To"	3
US R&B/Hip-Hop Airplay (Billboard)	31

Weekly chart performance for "Hot Like Fire" (Timbaland's Groove Mix)
Chart (2021)	Peak position
US R&B Digital Song Sales	9

== Release history ==
Release dates and formats for "Hot Like Fire"
Region	Date	Format(s) (Note: On physical formats, "Hot Like Fire" was released as a double A-side single with "The One I Gave My Heart To".)	Label(s)	Ref.
United States	September 16, 1997	12-inch vinyl; cassette; CD; maxi CD	Blackground; Atlantic	
United Kingdom	October 27, 1997	12-inch vinyl; cassette; CD	Atlantic	

== Bibliography ==
- Footman, Tim (2021). Aaliyah. Plexus Publishing Limited. ISBN 9780859657136.
- Warner, Jennifer (2014). Aaliyah: A Biography. BookCap Study Guides. ISBN 9781629173597.
