= 4 Page Letter =

Single by Aaliyah

from the album One in a Million
- B-side: "Death of a Playa"; "One in a Million"
- Released: April 8, 1997
- Recorded: 1996
- Studio: Pyramid (Ithaca, New York)
- Genre: R&B
- Length: 4:52
- Label: Blackground; Atlantic
- Songwriters: Melissa Elliott; Timothy Mosley
- Producer: Timbaland

Aaliyah singles chronology
"One in a Million" (1996)	"4 Page Letter" (1997)	"Up Jumps da Boogie" (1997)

Music video
- "4 Page Letter" on YouTube

"4 Page Letter" is a song by American singer Aaliyah and released by Blackground Records and Atlantic Records on April 8, 1997 as the fourth single from her second studio album, One in a Million (1996). Written by both Missy Elliott and Timbaland and produced by the latter, the R&B ballad features the protagonist expressing feelings for her crush in the form of a titular four-page love letter.

Upon release, the song was met with generally positive reviews from critics, with many praising both Aaliyah's delivery and the song's production. In the United States, "4 Page Letter" peaked at number 12 on the R&B/Hip-Hop Airplay chart and at number 26 on the Rhythmic chart. Internationally, the song peaked at number 24 on the UK Singles Chart and reached number 49 in New Zealand.

An accompanying video for "4 Page Letter" was directed by Daniel Pearl, while its storyline was created by her brother Rashad Haughton. The video depicts Aaliyah in a village-like setting as she secretly watches her crush. It received critical acclaim, with many critics comparing the video to several survival films and television shows.

== Music and lyrics ==
"4 Page Letter" is an "R&B come-on" that touches "on the '60s soul trope of letter-sending romance, with a distinctly modern sensibility". Its production has a Bass drum beat that is reduced to operating as a click track. Also, the instrumental features layered harmonies within producer Timbaland's "mysterious, beguiling beat". According to Complex, "Her enunciation asks that you linger on individual words she sings, when she finally begins to, thirty-some seconds into the song. The beat plods and shakes a lonely maraca line across the space of "4 Page Letter"." Author Kirsty Fairclough said of Aaliyah's vocals on the song, "At this point, the voice barely ceases in terms of sonic constancy". "This is part voice delivery and part voice overdubs". The song's mixing "splits the voice into multiples, layered into and away from each other:calls and answers, questions and answers, harmonization, and guide vocals. (offset by backing vocals)." Overall, her vocals are clean, singular, and mixed "as apart or even 'above' the music in terms of sonic spacing".

Lyrically, Aaliyah "expresses her affection for a dude who caught her eye" by communicating her feelings for him in the form of a love letter. According to The Boombox, Aaliyah gets intimate about her "inner-yearning for the apple of her eye and decides to get her feelings off of her chest by penning a detailed letter, which we get a glimpse of in audio form". She sings, "Mama always told me to be careful who I love/And daddy always told me make sure he's right/I always had my eyes on this one particular guy/I was too shy so I decided to write". Variety writers discussed the lyrical content saying, "With lyrics like "Baby, when I get the nerve to come to you, promise me that you won't dis me," Aaliyah describes the anxious feelings that come with being a 17-year-old with a crush".

In September 2021, Elliott revealed in a tweet that the opening lines from Aaliyah only came about after a mistake: "When I was in the booth singing this my engineer had the music too low so I was telling him to turn it up but Aaliyah thought I meant to do it so she sung it like i did on the demo but it was a mistake ... because [Aaliyah] loved the mistake I told Jimmy the engineer to keep raising the music on the track everytime she say turn it up so it would make sense to the listeners so y'all wouldn't think we was crazy". Fairclough analyzed the intro saying, "'4 Page Letter' opens with spoken words: an insistent, repeated instruction from Aaliyah' as if emceeing at a spontaneous warehouse party, and that the mixer duly obeys:"Yo – turn my music up... Up some more... Up – some more...Up a little bit more'." Fairclough continued saying, "but what is turned up is a steady beat and one that then achieves amplification and space for Aaliyah to move into and occupy unimpeded".

== Critical reception ==
Ross Scarano from Complex praised the production of "4 Page Letter", saying: "Timbaland's production is like a haunted maze you walk. And the final payoff you encounter, that languid synth line at nearly five minutes in, is so sticky and fine, you can't help but hit replay to find it again". Nakita Rathod from HotNewHipHop felt that the "slow but sexy beat" fit well with Aaliyah's voice. Kenneth Partridge from Billboard felt that Aaliyah displayed a "stunning" example of maturity beyond her years on "4 Page Letter", and that she treated Timbaland's "tissuey beat like fine stationery". In a review for One in a Million, Connie Johnson from the Los Angeles Times praised the song and called it "gently poignant". British magazine Music Week rated it four out of five, describing it as "late night slink from the teen soulstress". According to Bob Waliszewski from Plugged In, the song "finds the artist recalling–and following–her parents' advice". Bianca Gracie from Fuse believed that "4 Page Letter" remained one of the best ballads in Aaliyah's discography. In an August 2021 retrospective review, Billboard praised both Aaliyah's vocal delivery and the songs production, while declaring "the result is an arresting track that is equal parts cautious and confident". Writers from Variety praised both Aaliyah's voice and the songs production saying, her "gospel-influenced intonations on the chorus paired with Timbaland's maraca sounds create a feeling of longing and infatuation, taking us back to the days of passing notes to high school sweethearts. Entertainment Weekly writer Brandon Caldwell said, on the song "Aaliyah's optimistic pleas regarding newfound love feel both approachable and disarming".

== Commercial performance ==
"4 Page Letter" peaked at number 12 on the US R&B/Hip-Hop Airplay chart on April 19, 1997. On the Rhythmic Top 40, the song peaked at number 26 on May 17. In the United Kingdom, the song peaked at number 24 on the UK Singles Chart on August 30, at number 14 on the dance chart on August 24, and at number nine on the R&B chart on August 24. In New Zealand, the song peaked at number 49 on September 14, 1997.

In August 2021, it was reported that the album and Aaliyah's other recorded work for Blackground (since rebranded as Blackground Records 2.0) would be re-released on physical, digital, and streaming services in a deal between the label and Empire Distribution. One in a Million was reissued on August 20, 2021, despite Aaliyah's estate issuing a statement in response to Blackground 2.0's announcement, denouncing the "unscrupulous endeavor to release Aaliyah's music without any transparency or full accounting to the estate". Following the album's re-release, "4 Page Letter" debuted at number 26 on the US Digital Song Sales the week of September 4, 2021, debuting at number 5 on the R&B component.

== Music video ==
=== Background ===
The music video for "4 Page Letter" was directed by Daniel Pearl, while its concept was created by Aaliyah's brother Rashad Haughton. The video was conceptualized as a short story, which was translated into a short film. Pearl elaborated on the video treatment process, saying: "I basically wrote it up as a film, described it scene by scene, some descriptions of what the shots will be, etc. We went from there". The video was filmed at the Sable Ranch near Los Angeles. While discussing the video's location in an interview, Pearl said: "I had a great production designer and we basically went into an existing forest and we dressed it with some of the vintage and some of the things to make it more interesting than it was, it took a couple of days". The video's opening scene had a big crane shoot and Pearl explained that the crane was "a 75-foot long crane arm that came out of Russia. With that crane in the forest, we started up above the trees and we smoked up the background and the sunlight was coming through the trees. We drop down and pick Aaliyah up as she crosses along a stream".

=== Fashion ===
For the music video Aaliyah's stylist Derek Lee went to North Beach Leather and got several leather and suede pieces. According to Lee, he put some fringe inside of a crop top. Lastly he revealed that the jacket that she wears in one of the scenes is actually his. "Whenever you see Aaliyah wearing a big oversized men's jacket or coat, they were always mine. I still have that coat", says Lee. In her book Baby Girl: Better Known as Aaliyah (2021) author–journalist Kathy Iandoli said the wardrobe in the video had a "mythical element".

=== Synopsis ===
The video takes place in a forest and shows Aaliyah secretly watching a man she likes dancing in a clearing near a rustic village. The next scene moves to Aaliyah doing a dance routine with two dancers in a village as the man she secretly watched before is locked in a cage. After the village scene, a group of people stand in a circle to watch the two men, one of which is Aaliyah's crush, fight one another. As the fight is happening, Aaliyah emerges out of nowhere and rescues her crush. The pair then dance together in a ring of fire for the remainder of the video. The video ends with the 4 page letter flying into the ring of fire. Jordan Simon from Idolator felt that the video for "4 Page Letter" displayed a striking resemblance to the film Lord of the Flies and the television series Lost. While, Iandoli said the video had a "fairly tale "Once upon a time"–esque theme".

=== Release and reception ===
The music video for "4 Page Letter" made its television debut on the week ending April 20, 1997 on cable network channels such as BET and MTV. On May 3 the video premiered on The Box. For the week ending June 8, 1997, the video was the 29th most-played video on MTV. Meanwhile, the video was the 20th most-played video on BET for the week ending June 15, 1997. Bianca Gracie from Fuse believed that the video "drove the romantic message home". BET said that, "The release of this video was one of the first times we really got to see what a great dancer Aaliyah was". Singer-Actress Keke Palmer's music video for her song "Yellow Lights" (2016) was inspired by "4 Page Letter". According to Palmer, "One of my favorite videos was '4 Page Letter' by Aaliyah so the vision for the video was a take on that vibe, mixed in with who I am as an artist". Steffanee Wang from Nylon stated, "Aaliyah embraces nature in this bizarre video that involves her capturing a man in the wild and keeping him in a cage before dancing with him before a raging fire fit for a sacrificial ceremony. Kinda hot, tbh." In the book Diva: Feminism and Fierceness from Pop to Hip-Hop (2023), author Kirsty Fairclough felt the video is "overloaded with storylines to the point of incomprehensibility".

== Live performances ==
In August 1997 Aaliyah performed "4 Page Letter" at KKBT 92.3 The Beat's annual Summer Jam concert at the Irvine Meadows Amphitheatre in Irvine, California. Cheo Hodari Coke from the Los Angeles Times praised Aaliyah's performance saying that she had "tight choreography, heartfelt vocals and enough platinum hits to delight the crowd". The Daily Bruin gave a more mixed review explaining that, "Aaliyah’s vocals were right on the line with "4 Page Letter" and the rattling "One In A Million," but she might as well have sung from backstage with the uninspiring stage presence she quickly revealed. She may be a sexy video honey, but at the Jam, the attitude just wasn’t there".

== Track listings and formats ==
- UK CD1 single
1. "4 Page Letter" (album version) – 3:34
2. "4 Page Letter" (Timbaland's Main Mix) – 4:37
3. "4 Page Letter" (Quiet Storm Mix) – 4:33
4. "Death of a Playa" (featuring Rashad Haughton) – 4:53
- UK CD2 single
1. "4 Page Letter" (album version) – 3:34
2. "One in a Million" (remix featuring Ginuwine) – 5:06
3. "One in a Million" (Nitebreed Monogolodic Dub) – 9:52
4. "One in a Million" (Nitebreed Bootleg Mix) – 7:13

== Charts ==
Weekly chart performance for "4 Page Letter"
Chart (1997)	Peak position
Europe (European Hot 100 Singles)	97
New Zealand (Recorded Music NZ)	49
Scottish Singles Sales (Official Charts)	94
UK Singles (Official Charts)	24
UK Dance (Official Charts)	14
UK Hip Hop/R&B (Official Charts)	9
US Radio Songs (Billboard)	59
US R&B/Hip-Hop Airplay (Billboard)	12
US Rhythmic Airplay (Billboard)	26

Chart (2021)	Peak position
US R&B Digital Song Sales	5

== Release history ==
Release dates and formats for "4 Page Letter"
Region	Date	Format(s)	Label(s)	Ref.
United States	April 8, 1997	Rhythmic contemporary radio	Blackground; Atlantic	
United States	May 20, 1997	Contemporary hit radio	Blackground; Atlantic	
United Kingdom	August 18, 1997	12-inch vinyl; two maxi CDs	Atlantic	

== Bibliography ==
- Fairclough, Kristy; Halligan, Benjamin; Rambarran, Shara; Persley, Nicole Hodges (2023). Diva: Feminism and Fierceness from Pop to Hip-Hop. Bloomsbury Publishing. ISBN 9781501368257.
- Iandoli, Kathy (2021). Baby Girl: Better Known as Aaliyah. Atria Books. ISBN 978-1982156862.
