= Got to Give It Up =

1977 single by Marvin Gaye

- Picture sleeve for one of U.S. vinyl singles

Single by Marvin Gaye

from the album Live at the London Palladium
- A-side: "Got to Give It Up" (Pt. 1)
- B-side: "Got to Give It Up" (Pt. 2)
- Released: March 15, 1977
- Recorded: December 1976
- Studio: Marvin's Room, Los Angeles, California
- Genre: Funk; disco; soul
- Length: 11:52 (full-length version); 4:12 (single version)
- Label: Tamla
- Songwriter: Marvin Gaye
- Producer: Art Stewart

Marvin Gaye singles chronology
"Since I Had You" (1976)	"Got to Give It Up" (1977)	"Pops, We Love You" (1978)

Audio video
- "Got to Give It Up" on YouTube

"Got to Give It Up" is a song by American singer-songwriter Marvin Gaye. Written by the singer and produced by Art Stewart as a response to a request from Gaye's record label that he perform disco music, it was released in March 1977.

Upon its release, it topped three different Billboard charts, including the Hot 100, and became a worldwide success. Gaye sometimes used the song to open his concerts. The song has been covered by several acts.

== Background ==
Throughout 1976, Gaye's popularity was still at a high in America and abroad, but the singer struggled throughout the year due to pending lawsuits from former bandmates. Divorce court proceedings between Gaye and first wife Anna Gordy had also put a strain on him. Financial difficulties almost led to imprisonment for the singer when Gordy accused him of failing to pay child support payments for their only child, son Marvin Pentz Gaye III.

To relieve Gaye from his debt, his European concert promoter Jeffrey Kruger booked the singer on a lengthy European tour. Gaye began the tour in the United Kingdom where he had a strong fan base dating back to his early career in the 1960s, making his first stop in the country since 1964. His performances there were given rave reviews. One of the shows, filmed at London's Palladium, was recorded for a live album, later released as Live at the London Palladium, in the spring of 1977.

Around the same time, Gaye's label Motown tried to get him to record disco music, which was popular and commercially viable at the time. Gaye criticized the genre, however, claiming it lacked substance, and refused to record a disco album. His label mate Diana Ross had recorded "Love Hangover", her first disco song. The song's producer Hal Davis debated whether to give the song to Ross or Gaye. After working over the song, he went with Ross, and it became her fourth solo number one hit. Motown struggled to get Gaye in the studio as Gaye focused on work on an album (which later was released as Here, My Dear, dedicated to Gaye's troubled first marriage). After months of holding off from recording anything resembling disco, the singer set upon writing a song parodying a disco setting.

== Production ==
The first recording session for "Got to Give It Up", originally titled "Dancing Lady", was on December 13, 1976. Influenced by Johnnie Taylor's hit "Disco Lady", Gaye was inspired to create his answer song to Taylor's hit. To help set up a "disco" atmosphere, Gaye hired Motown producer and engineer Art Stewart to oversee the song's production. Gaye and Stewart brought in several musicians and Gaye's friends, his brother Frankie, sister Zeola and girlfriend Janis Hunter to Marvin's Room, Gaye's recording studio complex. From December 14 to 17, 1976, Gaye performed the lead vocal track, instrumentation (which included Gaye, Fernando Harkness, Johnny McGhee, Frankie Beverly and Bugsy Wilcox and The Funk Brothers member Jack Ashford) and background vocals. In the song, Gaye added background vocals from his brother and his girlfriend. During the second half of the song, the song introduces vocal layered doo-wop styled scatting from Gaye and produced a funk-influenced vamp. Fernando Harkness performs a tenor saxophone solo in the second half of the song.

Gaye recorded his vocals on the first date of sessions, adding instrumentation on the following day, and then adding other effects in the latter two days, mixing it by January 1977. Influenced by the vocal chatter on his previous hit "What's Going On", Gaye decided to create a party scene outside the recording studio where different voices are heard either greeting each other or partying. Gaye is heard on the track greeting people and laughing while mingling in with the crowd. During the bridge, Gaye is heard yelling "Say Don! Hey man, I didn't know you was in here!" The "Don" later was confirmed as Soul Train host Don Cornelius, who was one of Gaye's close friends. Gaye overlapped the party sounds over and over, making a loop. In the second half of the song, Gaye sings mainly the initial title, "dancing lady" over and over while a saxophone is playing a solo. All the background vocals on the second part of the song were from Gaye. He also played percussion, bass keyboards and RMI synthesisers in the final fade of the song. In the second half, he can be heard playing on a glass bottle halfway filled with grapefruit juice. L.T.D. guitarist Johnny McGhee added guitar. McGhee and Frankie Beverly were the only non-bandmates featured on the song playing instruments. Beverly also added assorted percussion.

== Composition ==
After the start of the song, which includes vocal chatter, the song kicks off with a standard drum beat: kick, snare and hi-hat, and synthesizers are heard soon afterward. After nearly a minute, Gaye's vocals appear in a falsetto, which he sings in for most of the song. In the second half, after harmonizing in falsetto, Gaye's tenor vocals take over.

The song's story focuses on a man who is a wallflower when he comes into a nightclub nervous to perform on the dance floor. But after a minute of this, the music takes over and his body starts to lose any inhibitions. Midway, he finally cuts loose before shouting the chant "non-stop express, party y'all; feel no distress, I'm at my best — let's dance, let's shout, gettin' funky what it's all about!" proving the power of the dance can overtake any shyness. The dance is focused on Gaye and a suitable female partner he seeks. In the second half, a funkier jazz arrangement is helped in guitar, bass and a tambourine. After this, he continues chanting until the song fades.

== Release and reception ==
The record was released in March 1977 and eventually topped the U.S. Billboard charts. The song held the number one position on the US Billboard Hot 100 for one week, from June 18 to 25, 1977. It replaced "Dreams" by Fleetwood Mac, and was replaced by "Gonna Fly Now" by Bill Conti. On the R&B singles charts, it held the number one spot for five weeks from April 30 until June 17, 1977 (being interrupted twice at the number one position for one week by "Whodunit" by Tavares for the week of May 21, 1977, and Stevie Wonder's "Sir Duke" for the week of May 28, 1977, respectively). On the disco charts, the single was a number one hit. Billboard ranked it as the No. 20 song of 1977.

It reached number one on the dance charts in May. The single also found success outside the United States reaching number seven on the UK Singles Chart, his biggest charted hit as a solo artist since his version of "Abraham, Martin & John" had peaked at number nine on the chart in 1970. Previously, Gaye had modest success with two singles: "Save the Children (song)" (released as a double-A side with Gaye's 1966 recording "Little Darling (I Need You)") in 1971 and "Let's Get It On" in 1973 (which peaked at number 31 on the UK chart). The single also found modest success in some countries, peaking at number 24 on the Dutch singles chart and number 31 on the New Zealand charts. The single's success helped its parent album Live at the London Palladium find substantial success on the Billboard 200, where it stayed at the top 10 for several weeks. Sales of the album eventually reached two million.

Cash Box said that "this highly infectious tune features Gaye's vocals over throbbing drums and street jive noise that has a sound just right for the disco, and tailor made for an upbeat mood." Record World said that it's "an atmospheric party track sparked by [Gaye's] distinctive vocal." New York Times critic John Rockwell called the song "a pure dance record in the modern disco mode" but wondered if its popularity was due more to Gaye's reputation than to its own merits.

== Legacy ==
Gaye's song became an important influence and motivation for Michael Jackson, who was searching to write a potential hit after the Jacksons had struggled with previous offerings. Jackson later wrote, with brother Randy, "Shake Your Body (Down to the Ground)", adapting parts of Gaye's chant, transforming it into "let's dance, let's shout, shake your body down to the ground". The song "Don't Stop 'til You Get Enough", written solely by Jackson and recorded the same year as "Shake Your Body", took even more of Gaye's approach with "Got to Give It Up", using percussive instruments and a continued funk guitar riff. Jackson sings most of the song in falsetto. Jackson's producer Quincy Jones added in string instruments used during the instrumental intro and a synthesizer guitar during the song's bridge. Much like the party chatter in "Got to Give It Up", Jones added in vocal chatter; however, the chatter later was debated as two people having a verbal argument while the tape was recording (a woman could be heard hollering "I love your little ass anyway!"). Jones allowed the argument in the recording.

"Got to Give It Up" has been featured in the films Menace II Society (1993), Boogie Nights (1997), Practical Magic (1998), How Stella Got Her Groove Back (1998), Summer of Sam (1999), Charlie's Angels (2000), Barbershop (2002), This Christmas (2007), The Nanny Diaries (2007), Eat Pray Love (2010), Paul (2011), and Da 5 Bloods (2020).

The song was featured in the television shows The Wire, Scrubs, True Blood, Brooklyn Nine-Nine, and Scandal.

The 2013 hit single "Blurred Lines" by Robin Thicke, Pharrell Williams and song co-writer T.I. was the subject of a lawsuit for allegedly copying "Got to Give It Up". Thicke originally told the public both he and Williams were in the recording studio, and suddenly Thicke told Pharrell "Damn, we should make something like that, something with that groove" and they wrote the song in less than an hour. However, Thicke later claimed this was all a lie, and the song was written entirely by Pharrell. Thicke stated "I was high on Vicodin and alcohol when I showed up at the studio." On March 10, 2015, a federal jury found "Blurred Lines" infringed on "Got to Give It Up" and awarded nearly $7.4 million to Gaye's children. Jurors found against Williams and Thicke, but held harmless the record company and T.I. While damages were reduced to $5.3 million, the jury's decision was upheld on appeal. As an additional remedy, Gaye was credited as a songwriter for "Blurred Lines". This in turn affected "Weird Al" Yankovic's parody of "Blurred Lines", titled "Word Crimes", where Gaye has been added as a songwriter.

== Personnel ==
- Marvin Gaye: lead vocals, RMI synthesizer bass, keyboards, percussion, bottle, background vocals (Part II)
- Johnny McGhee: guitar
- Gordon Banks: guitar (Part II)
- Fernando Harkness: saxophone
- Bugsy Wilcox: drums
- Jack Ashford: tambourine, bottle, cow bell
- Frankie Gaye: background vocals (Part I)
- Janis Gaye: background vocals (Part I)
- Zeola Gaye: background vocals (Part I)
- Vocal, rhythm and synthesizer arrangement by Marvin Gaye
- Produced and engineered by Art Stewart
- Mixing by Art Stewart and Marvin Gaye

== Charts ==
Chart performance for "Got to Give It Up"
Chart (1977)	Peak position
Belgium (Ultratop 50 Flanders)	28
Belgium (Ultratop 50 Wallonia)	43
Canada RPM Top Singles	5
Netherlands (Single Top 100)	24
New Zealand (Recorded Music NZ)	31
UK Singles (Official Charts)	7
US Billboard Hot 100	1
US Hot Soul Singles	1
US National Disco Action	1

== Certifications ==
Certifications for "Got to Give It Up"
Region	Certification	Certified units/sales
New Zealand (RMNZ)	Platinum	30,000^{‡}
United Kingdom (BPI)	Gold	400,000^{‡}
^{‡} Sales+streaming figures based on certification alone.

== Aaliyah version ==
"Got to Give It Up"

Single by Aaliyah featuring Slick Rick

from the album One in a Million
- B-side: "No Days Go By"
- Released: November 4, 1996
- Studio: Spectrum (Greensboro); Larrabee (Los Angeles)
- Genre: Funk; hip hop (album version); Electro-disco (remix)
- Length: 4:41 (album version); 4:02 (radio edit)
- Label: Blackground; Atlantic
- Songwriters: Marvin Gaye; Slick Rick
- Producers: Vincent Herbert; Craig King

Aaliyah singles chronology
"If Your Girl Only Knew" (1996)	"Got to Give It Up" (1996)	"One in a Million" (1996)

Slick Rick singles chronology
"I Like" (1996)	"Got to Give It Up" (1996)	"Just Another Case" (1997)

Music video
- "Got to Give It Up" on YouTube

American singer Aaliyah recorded a cover version of the song for her second studio album One in a Million (1996). It featured a guest appearance from rapper Slick Rick, and was released as the album's second single outside North America on November 4, 1996.

=== Recording and production ===
Aaliyah decided to record "Got to Give It Up" because she wanted to have party songs on the album. In an interview Aaliyah stated: "I wanted some real party songs, so when my uncle played me that [original track], I thought of how I could make it different. Slick Rick [who had been in jail] was on work release at the time, so Vincent got him on the song". Producer Craig King recalls that when Aaliyah was recording "Got to Give It Up" she danced the entire time.

During the recording process of the song the producers sat for hours writing down the lyrics because they did not know them. King stated: "To me, the funniest part was trying to figure out the lyrics. Marvin Gaye sang in such a crazy way, a lot of words we didn't know. We had to sit there for hours making sure we were writing it down properly. We still think we might've gotten some words wrong." Also during the production process the producers changed about five words in the song so that they could fit Aaliyah. The overall goal while recording the song was to make it blend in with the current time as the producers did not want it to sound too dated. According to King, "We didn't want it to sound like it was from the '70s so we changed some lyrics because some of the words just wouldn't work in the '90s like 'suga mama.'" Aaliyah was proud to cover the song, and said: "I don't know how Marvin Gaye fans will react, but I hope they like it. I always think it's a great compliment when people remake songs. I hope one day after I'm not here that people will cover my songs".

=== Music and lyrics ===
Journalist–Author Christopher John Farley labeled "Got to Give It Up", as a "hip hop infused remake of Gaye's dance classic". The song itself features a sample from Michael Jackson's "Billie Jean" (1983). In 2002 the song was remixed for Aaliyah's first compilation album I Care 4 U and Dotmusic writer Dan Gennoe labeled the new remix as Electro-disco.

On the song, Kris Ex wrote in Vibe that she places "her falsetto toe to toe against the liquid overlapping rhyme scheme of hip hop's ultimate storyteller Slick Rick". Author Tim Footman felt that Aaliyahs vocals "takes on Marvin Gaye's own angelic qualities, as if she's floating above Rick's faintly ridiculous antics". In terms of the songs lyrical theme author Tim Footman says, Rick "plays a parody of his own gansta persona. He's trying to be a laidback playa, chugging Hennessy Brandy and Chrystal champagne, but his bubble of cool is popped when Aaliyah walks into the party". In his review of One in a Million Bob Waliszewski from Plugged In, said the song lyrically is about finding "a man in a dance club ordering alcohol".

=== Critical reception ===
While reviewing One in a Million, writer Dream Hampton from Vibe was shocked with the outcome of Aaliyah's cover version of "Got to Give It Up". According to Hampton, "The album has some surprises too. Like any self respecting Marvin Gaye fan, I cringed when I learned Aaliyah had covered his classic 1977 party jam "Got to Give It Up". But her version is agreeably accurate (even with Slick Rick's snippet of an intro)". Hampton also wrote that Aaliyah was just as convincing as Gaye when it comes to the song's theme of being a wallflower. Another Vibe writer said that Aaliyah puts a "feminine spin" on the cover, while still "magically" preserving "the soul-enriched integrity of the original". Connie Johnson from the Los Angeles Times wrote that Aaliyah's skills were being displayed on the song and that her version of "Got to Give It Up" was irresistible. Dean Van Nguyen from The Independent praised Aaliyah's voice on the song, writing that she sounded great. Larry Flick from Billboard felt that she handled the cover well by performing it with "a perfect blend of quiet sensuality and breathy shyness". Flicks Billboard colleague Joe Lynch praised Aaliyah's ability to "serve as a dancefloor siren on this one, which puts “Blurred Lines" to shame". Sal Cinquemani from Slant said it was "a funky old-school cover" of the original song. In his autobiography Aaliyah: More Than a Woman Farley said, the song "allowed Aaliyah to bridge generations", he further explained that "older listeners got to relive some of the great music of their youth, while younger listeners were introduced to a whole new world of soul". Brandon Caldwell from Entertainment Weekly said the song "is a festive twist on Marvin Gaye's classic", and that "Aaliyah molds the uptempo track to her liking, taking Gaye's flirty falsetto and making it even more playful." Stereogum writer Tom Breihan called the song "a funky, convincing cover".

=== Music video ===
The music video for "Got to Give It Up" was directed by Paul Hunter. According to Hunter, this was his first major music video that he directed. He would go on to direct two more videos for Aaliyah including, "One In a Million" (1996) and "We Need a Resolution" (2001). The video begins with Aaliyah driving and then getting out of the car. As she leaves the car, she sees a hologram of Marvin Gaye through an empty building window. Aaliyah walks towards the window, smiles, then walks into the building. Once she enters the building, she begins to perform the song by singing "into an old-school hanging dynamic microphone". In between her performance, Gaye's hologram reappears off and on, and the duo dance alongside each other. While she is performing, local bystanders loiter and dance outside the window. Eventually, Aaliyah breaks through the glass window and joins the party on the streets. During the street party, she dances on the hood of a yellow taxi. The video ends with everyone partying as the police show up.

=== Commercial performance ===
"Got to Give It Up" was a minor hit in the United Kingdom, peaking at number 37 on the UK Singles Chart on November 16, 1996. Elsewhere in the UK, it peaked within the top ten on the dance and R&B charts, at number 10 and 4 respectively. In New Zealand, the song peaked at number 34 on October 19, 1997.

=== Track listings and formats ===
Maxi CD single

1. "Got to Give It Up" (radio edit) – 4:15
2. "Got to Give It Up" (TNT's House Mix) – 6:58
3. "No Days Go By" – 4:41
4. "Got to Give It Up" (Tee's Freeze Radio) – 3:34

Cassette single

1. "Got to Give It Up" (radio edit) – 4:15
2. "No Days Go By" – 4:41

12-inch vinyl

1. "Got to Give It Up" (radio edit) – 4:15
2. "Got to Give It Up" (album version) – 4:41
3. "Got to Give It Up" (Tee's Freeze Club) – 6:42
4. "Got to Give It Up" (TNT's House Mix) – 6:58

=== Charts ===
Weekly chart performance for "Got to Give It Up"
Chart (1996–1997)	Peak position
New Zealand (Recorded Music NZ)	34
Scottish Singles Sales (Official Charts)	98
UK Singles (Official Charts)	37
UK Dance (Official Charts)	10
UK Hip Hop/R&B (Official Charts)	4

=== Release history ===
Release dates and formats for "Got to Give It Up"
Region	Date	Format(s)	Label(s)	Ref.
United Kingdom	November 4, 1996	12-inch vinyl; cassette; maxi CD	Atlantic	
Germany	November 8, 1996	Maxi CD	Warner Music	
Japan	November 11, 1996	Maxi CD	Warner Music	
France	December 6, 1996	Maxi CD	Warner Music	

== Recordings by other artists ==
The song has been featured in several films and soundtracks since its release, including the soundtracks to films such as 54, Summer of Sam and The Nanny Diaries; it was featured in the films Charlie's Angels, How Stella Got Her Groove Back, Menace II Society and Barbershop. Justin Timberlake performed the song live at the 2008 Fashion Rocks concert. Gaye's daughter Nona recorded an unreleased version with Prince's band New Power Generation. Zhané performed this song on a tribute album of various artists titled Marvin Is 60. The song was performed by Thom Yorke's band Atoms for Peace during a live concert performance.

== Bibliography ==
- Farley, Christopher John (2002). Aaliyah: More Than a Woman. Simon & Schuster. ISBN 0-7434-5566-5.
- Footman, Tim (2021). Aaliyah. Plexus Publishing Limited. ISBN 9780859657136.
- Iandoli, Kathy (2021). Baby Girl: Better Known as Aaliyah. Atria Books. ISBN 978-1982156862.
