= Rashad Haughton =

American film director (born 1977)

- Born: Rashad Hasan Haughton; August 6, 1977 (age 49); New York City, U.S.
- Education: Hofstra University
- Occupations: Writer; director
- Years active: 1994–present
- Relatives: Aaliyah (sister); Barry Hankerson (uncle); Tek (cousin)

Rashad Hasan Haughton (born August 6, 1977) is an American former writer, film director, and screenwriter. Haughton is the older brother of American singer and actress Aaliyah and nephew of Blackground Records founder Barry Hankerson.

== Early life ==
Rashad Hasan Haughton was born in Brooklyn, on August 6, 1977, to Diane (née Hankerson) and Michael Haughton. Haughton’s mother is African-American and his paternal grandparents were from Jamaica. He and his younger sister Aaliyah (1979–2001) were born 17 months apart. When he was seven years old, the family moved to Detroit. He and Aaliyah attended a Catholic school, Gesu Elementary. Haughton graduated from Aquinas High School in 1995 and Hofstra University in 2000.

== Career ==
=== 1994–2015: Acting, writing and directing ===
Haughton appeared in a number of Aaliyah's music videos, including "Age Ain't Nothing but a Number", "If Your Girl Only Knew", "4 Page Letter" and "Hot Like Fire". When production started on the "4 Page Letter" video, Haughton completed the video synopsis within two hours, fitting it in between his studies at Hofstra University. The video was directed by Daniel Pearl.

In 2000, Haughton wrote and directed The Mim Rose. It starred Aaliyah as Melissa.

In February 2002, Queen of the Damned, a film which starred Aaliyah as Queen Akasha, was released. The film debuted at number one and was dedicated to Aaliyah. Before its release, Haughton was called in to re-dub several of his sister's lines during the post-production ADR process. Rashad also stood in for Aaliyah during the tail end of her appearance in Queen of the Damned's final scene, because Aaliyah died before the film was complete.

In 2004, Haughton appeared in the film Proud, playing the role of Hank Fields.

In 2006, Haughton released the short film Chrysalis which he wrote and directed. Additionally, Haughton wrote and directed Love Like Aliens in 2011 and Muga Shozoku in 2015.

=== 1996–2004: Music ===
"Death of a Playa" appeared on the B-side of the "4 Page Letter" single, a track Haughton wrote and recorded with Aaliyah in 1996 that was released in 1997. It was produced by Timbaland. In 2004, Haughton was featured on "Fork In The Road" (with 1200 Techniques), which peaked at number 55 on Australian Charts.

== Aaliyah's legacy ==
=== 2001–2002: Awards and charity ===
Haughton appeared at the 2001 MTV Video Music Awards to pay tribute to his sister, alongside Aaliyah's role model Janet Jackson and her close friends/coworkers Ginuwine, Missy Elliott, and Timbaland. The awards were presented just 12 days after Aaliyah's death, on September 6, and originally she was booked as one of its presenters.

On October 27, 2001, Aaliyah was scheduled to perform a duet with Seal at Breathe, a benefit concert for breast cancer treatment and research. Instead, Haughton presented the $41,000 check and introduced a tribute performance to Aaliyah by Seal.

On February 10, 2002, at the Hollywood Black Film Festival's closing night, Haughton accepted the Inspirational Spirit Award given to Aaliyah posthumously for her lifetime of excellence in entertainment. On February 23, 2002, Haughton accepted the NAACP Image Award for Outstanding Female Artist on Aaliyah's behalf.

=== 2017–Present: MAC collection, Madame Tussauds and discography rerelease ===
On August 24, 2017, MAC Cosmetics announced that an Aaliyah collection would be made available in the summer of 2018. The Aaliyah for Mac collection was released on June 20 online and June 21 in stores. Along with the MAC collection, MAC and i-D Magazine partnered up to release a short film titled "A-Z of Aaliyah" which coincided with the launch. Haughton dealt with the media promotion: "We wanted to create a line where the minimalism is there. You can re-create those archive looks from videos and film, but at the same time, mix, match, experiment, and imagine what Aaliyah’s style would look and feel like in 2018 and the future [...] My sister’s fans are so lovely and respectful [...] if they see something that is not approved by [the family], they attack it. They are very protective of my sister, which is heartwarming."

On August 21, 2019, the Madame Tussauds Las Vegas revealed a wax figure of Aaliyah. The lifesize figure was modelled on Aaliyah's iconic "Try Again" outfit and makeup. It was unveiled by Haughton to an invited audience.

In August 2021, it was reported that the One in a Million album and Aaliyah's other recorded work with Blackground (since rebranded as Blackground Records 2.0) would be re-released on physical, digital, and streaming services in a deal between the record label and Empire Distribution. However, Aaliyah's estate, run in part by Haughton, issued a statement preempting Blackground 2.0's announcement, denouncing an "unscrupulous endeavor to release Aaliyah's music without any transparency or full accounting to the estate". One In A Million was reissued on August 20, 2021 and re-entered the UK Official Hip Hop and R&B Albums Chart Top 40 at number eight and reached the top ten for on the Billboard 200 in the US for the first time at number ten, selling 26,000 album-equivalent units in the week ending of August 26. After the album's re-release, Aaliyah re-entered the UK Official Hip Hop and R&B Albums Chart Top 40 at number seven and reentered the US Billboard 200 chart at number 13, charting at number four for high pure sales.

== Filmography ==
=== As writer and director ===
| Year | Title | Notes |
|---|---|---|
| 2000 | The Mim Rose | Starred Aaliyah as Melissa |
| 2006 | Chrysalis | |
| 2011 | Love Like Aliens | |
| 2015 | Muga Shozoku | |
| 2023 | Half Samurai | |

=== As actor ===
| Year | Title | Role | Notes |
|---|---|---|---|
| 2002 | Queen of the Damned | Akasha | Voice only; uncredited |
| 2004 | Proud | Hank Fields | |
