= One in a Million (Aaliyah album) =

Studio album by Aaliyah
- Released: August 13, 1996
- Recorded: August 1995–1996
- Studios: Battery (New York City); Blue Light (New York City); Brimstone (Inglewood); Full Spectrum (Greensboro); House of Sound (New York City); Krosswire (Atlanta); Larrabee (Los Angeles); Manhattan Center (New York City); Mystic (New York City); Pyramid (Ithaca); Silent Sound (Atlanta); Vanguard (Detroit)
- Genres: R&B; pop; hip-hop
- Length: 73:18
- Labels: Blackground; Atlantic
- Producers: Timbaland; Carl-So-Lowe; J. Dibbs; Jermaine Dupri; KayGee; Vincent Herbert; Rodney Jerkins; Craig King; Darren Lighty; Daryl Simmons

Aaliyah chronology
Age Ain't Nothing but a Number (1994)	One in a Million (1996)	Aaliyah (2001)

Singles from One in a Million
- 1. "If Your Girl Only Knew" Released: July 15, 1996; 2. "Got to Give It Up" Released: November 4, 1996; 3. "One in a Million" Released: November 12, 1996; 4. "4 Page Letter" Released: April 8, 1997; 5. "The One I Gave My Heart To" Released: August 25, 1997; 6. "Hot Like Fire" Released: September 16, 1997

One in a Million is the second studio album by the American singer Aaliyah. It was released on August 13, 1996, by Blackground Records and Atlantic Records. Largely a collaborative effort with Timbaland and Missy Elliott, the album is an R&B, pop, and hip-hop record experimenting with genres such as trip-hop, electronica, funk, and jungle music. Its lyrical themes predominantly address relationship circumstances, such as commitment, abstinence, and heartbreak.

After facing allegations of an illegal marriage with her mentor R. Kelly following the success of her debut studio album, Age Ain't Nothing but a Number (1994), Aaliyah severed all ties with him, while Blackground ended its partnership with Jive Records and signed a new distribution deal with Atlantic. Throughout that period of turmoil, Aaliyah began recording her second studio album with Sean Combs, who soon abandoned the project, prompting Aaliyah and her management to seek new collaborators. She subsequently began recording with producers such as Jermaine Dupri, Vincent Herbert, and Craig King, before meeting the previously unknown Timbaland and Missy Elliott, who quickly became the primary contributors for One in a Million.

On release, One in a Million garnered generally positive reviews from music critics, mostly directed towards the innovative production and Aaliyah's progressed vocal performance. It debuted at number 20 on the US Billboard 200 with first-week sales of 40,500 copies, before reaching number 18. Internationally, One in a Million peaked within the top 40 in Canada, Japan, and the UK. In June 1997, the album was certified double platinum in the US by the Recording Industry Association of America (RIAA). By 2011, it had sold over three million copies domestically and eight million worldwide.

One in a Million was heavily and extensively promoted with media appearances and live performances. It produced six singles—"If Your Girl Only Knew", "Got to Give It Up", "One in a Million", "4 Page Letter", "The One I Gave My Heart To" and "Hot Like Fire"—with "The One I Gave My Heart To" becoming the highest-peaking single on the US Billboard Hot 100 at number nine. Following its 2021 reissue, the album peaked at number 10 on the US Billboard 200. Retrospectively, it has been listed among the best albums of its era and genre by numerous publications. It has further been credited for re-establishing Aaliyah's image, elevating the careers of Timbaland and Elliott, and influencing mainstream music trends of subsequent decades.

== Background and development ==
After Aaliyah's uncle Barry Hankerson obtained a distribution deal with Jive Records, he signed her to his label Blackground Records when she was 12 years old. He introduced her to R. Kelly, who became her mentor, as well as the sole producer for her debut studio album Age Ain't Nothing but a Number (1994). A commercial success, the album was certified double platinum by the Recording Industry Association of America (RIAA), selling three million copies in the United States and six million worldwide. To promote the album, Aaliyah embarked on a 1994–1995 world tour throughout the US, Europe, Japan, and South Africa. She soon faced allegations of an illegal marriage with Kelly, consequently ending her partnership with Jive and severing ties with Kelly. According to Aaliyah's cousin and Blackground executive Jomo Hankerson, the music industry "villainized" Aaliyah for the scandal, which caused difficulty with enlisting producers for One in a Million "except for a couple of relationships with Jermaine Dupri and Puffy". Aaliyah reflected on the situation, saying she faced the adversity by refusing to give up singing as it was her passion, and that she used the support from her fans as inspiration for recording One in a Million.

Following her departure from Jive, Aaliyah transferred to Atlantic Records in June 1996, as Blackground signed a new distribution deal with the label. In a press release surrounding One in a Million, Aaliyah admitted to being "a little anxious" over transitioning from Jive to Atlantic and reformulating her musical style. However, considering the label switch and a new team of collaborators, the album was intended to re-establish Aaliyah's fanbase and broaden her mainstream appeal, as it featured contributions from a wider range of producers–unlike Age Ain't Nothing but a Number, which was produced solely by Kelly. While speaking with the Associated Press, Aaliyah claimed One in a Million showcased her growth over the prior two years, especially in her vocal range. She also noted that she took artistic risks by experimenting with different styles, and felt the record showcased divergent sides of her personality.

== Recording and production ==
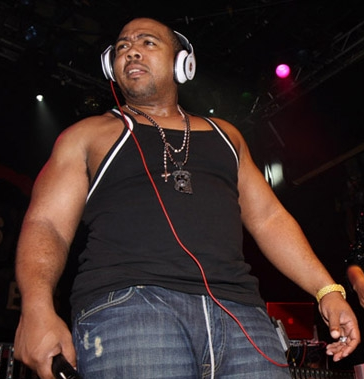
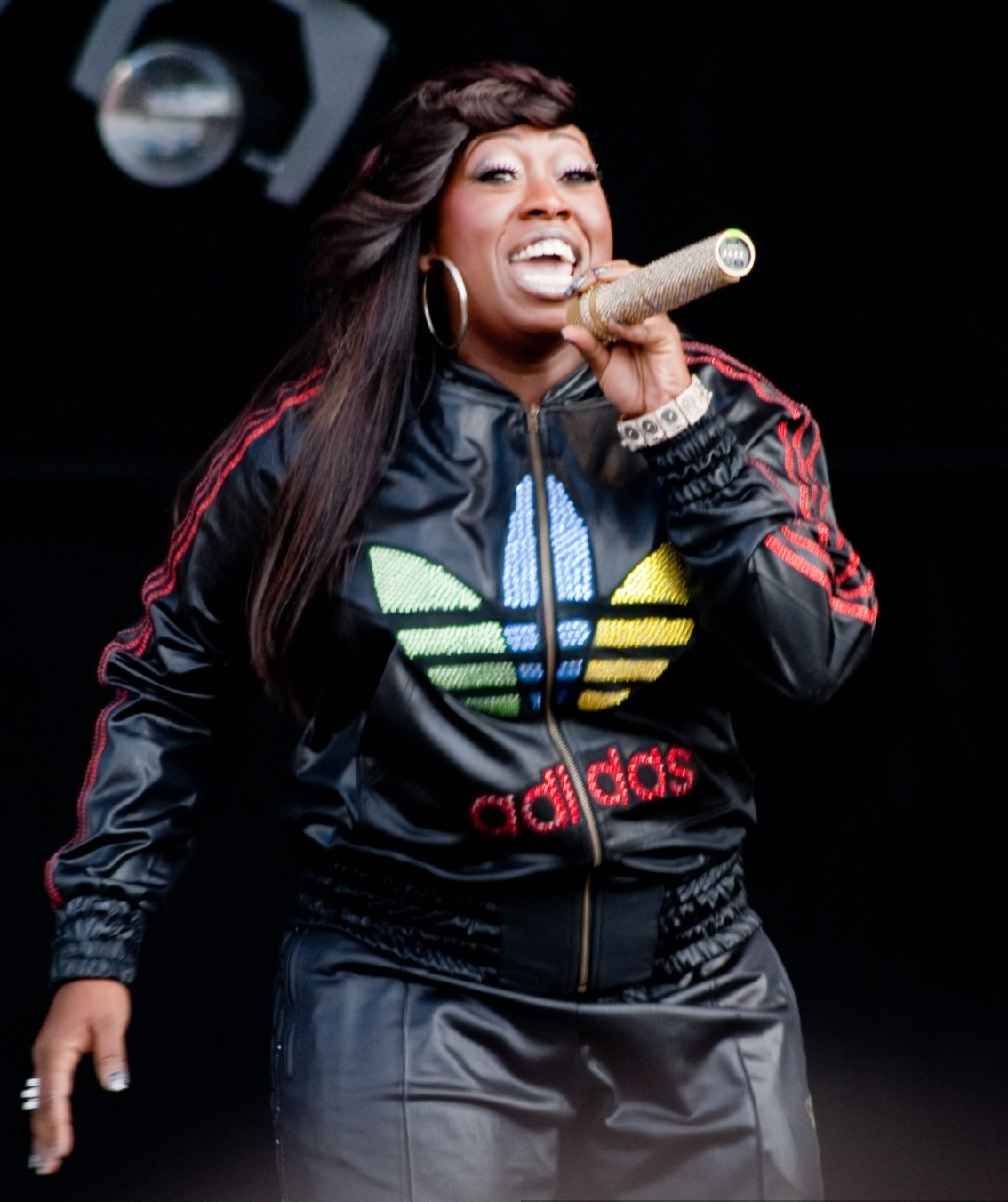
To create One in a Million, Aaliyah principally collaborated with Timbaland (left) and Missy Elliott.

Production for One in a Million dates back to August 1995, when Billboard reported Aaliyah was starting work on a new album; initially, it was slated for an early 1996 release and was to be produced by Sean Combs, J. Dibbs, and Dave Hall. The album was executive produced by Atlantic Records' then-executive vice president Craig Kallman, (Note: During the time Aaliyah was signed to Atlantic Records, Kallman was the label's executive vice president, overseeing its artists and repertoire (A&R) division. In 2005, he was named chairman and chief executive officer (CEO) of Atlantic.) Hankerson, and Aaliyah's father and manager Michael Haughton. While speaking with Billboard about its development, Atlantic Records' product development director Eddie Santiago mentioned: "We wanted Aaliyah to keep growing, so we didn't want to have the same suspects on her new project". In the same interview, Aaliyah discussed the record's direction: "I wanted to maintain my smooth street musical image but wanted to be funky and hot yet sophisticated". With One in a Million, Aaliyah became more involved with crafting the material by taking co-writing credits and assisting in the creative direction. Of the original producers enlisted for the album, Dibbs' songwriting and production effort "Giving You More" was included on the final track listing. Contributions from the likes of Hall never materialized, and she recorded songs with Combs at his studio in Trinidad for a week but their collaborative material was never finished as Aaliyah abandoned her session with Combs in favor of recording with Dupri in Atlanta. "I Gotcha' Back" was the sole track created during sessions with Dupri to be included on One in a Million; it was written and produced by Dupri and Carl-So-Lowe within "three to four days".

Vincent Herbert and Craig King were also approached to work on One in a Million; being among the earliest collaborators, they were allowed to "build a sound" for the record. Aaliyah recorded approximately eight songs with the pair at the Vanguard Studios in Detroit, two of which–"Choosey Lover (Old School/New School)" and "Never Givin' Up"–made the final track listing. "Never Givin' Up" was written by King and Monica Payne on the floor of the house he had just moved in, which inspired the first line "Sitting here in this empty room". King wrote the song to show appreciation to the Isley Brothers and the Clark Sisters. Tavarius Polk's earlier demo impressed Aaliyah and the producers so much he was kept on the track, which was originally conceived as Aaliyah's solo song. She recorded the song in a single session, with the lights completely turned off in the recording booth so her face could not be seen. The Herbert–King sessions also produced a cover of Marvin Gaye's 1977 song "Got to Give It Up" and "No Days Go By". Aaliyah elaborated on covering "Got to Give It Up" saying: "I wanted some real party songs, so when my uncle played me that [original track], I thought of how I could make it different. Slick Rick [who had been incarcerated] was on work release at the time, so Vincent "got him on the song." She co-wrote and did vocal arrangements on "No Days Go By", along with King and Rheji Burrell. The song is the album's sole track for which Aaliyah received writing credits, and was included only on the Japanese edition of One in a Million. Diane Warren became a part of the album's production as well, after reaching out to Kallman and expressing her desire to collaborate with Aaliyah. Warren's intention in working with Aaliyah was to have her perform a song she would not have usually performed, in order to showcase another side of her artistry, which included displays of a wider vocal range. She wrote "The One I Gave My Heart To", which was originally set to be produced by Babyface. However, he was unable to finalize the work due to unforeseen circumstances, so he enlisted Daryl Simmons as his replacement.

Aaliyah and Kallman promptly concluded it was important to find innovative producers who were not widely known to produce One in a Million, as the ultimate goal was to find Aaliyah her individual, artistry-defining sound. Kallman therefore started meeting with numerous obscure songwriters and producers including Timbaland. Kallman said that the point of their meeting became obvious when Timbaland first played beats: "This doesn't sound like anything that's out there and really had its own super exciting and electric, 'just dynamic properties.'" Previously, Atlantic had received a demo from him and Missy Elliott, titled "Sugar and Spice". The label felt the track was too juvenile lyrically but enjoyed its structure and melody, hence it was sent to Aaliyah, who was impressed. Consequently, Timbaland and Elliott were flown to Detroit to work with her. Prior to Aaliyah meeting Timbaland and Elliot, she spoke with them over the phone and explained the musical direction that she wanted to pursue. During her initial meeting with the duo, Aaliyah said they were skeptical about if she would like their work, ultimately she did as she thought it was "different" and "unique". Thereupon, the trio spent a week recording at the Vanguard Studios, with the first songs recorded being the title track and "If Your Girl Only Knew", before flying to Ithaca, New York to record at the Pyramid Studios. As primary collaborators on One in a Million, Timbaland and Elliott contributed to nine out of 17 tracks on the final track listing, providing ad-libs and rap vocals on their tracks in addition to songwriting and production.

== Music and lyrics ==
One in a Million is classified as predominantly an R&B, pop, and hip-hop record. According to Micha Frazer-Carroll from The Independent, it "had a bold, expansive vision, with tracks effortlessly bouncing from trip-hop to sensual slow jams to jungle beats". BET described the album as "a unique fusion of R&B, hip-hop, and electronic beats that was light-years ahead of its time". The album opens with the jungle-inspired intro "Beats 4 Da Streets", on which Elliott invites Aaliyah and the listeners into "the new world of funk", as echoing amid bells, blippy synths, and heavy bass are heard in the background. The trip hop track "Hot Like Fire" was described as a suggestive-themed "panting, minimalist controlled-blaze baby-maker". On "Hot Like Fire", Aaliyah makes a promise to her new lover "that his patience will be rewarded". The album's titular track is an ethereal club ballad with "seductive" trip hop, funk, electronica, and drum and bass influences. It incorporates "shimmering" synths and cricket noises within its instrumentation. Lyrically, the song sees Aaliyah expressing affection and devotion to her partner.

"If Your Girl Only Knew"
Against an organ-driven instrumentation, Aaliyah lambasts a man for attempting to seduce her despite already being involved in a relationship.

"A Girl Like You" has a "standard 90s boom bap beat", on which Aaliyah "holds her own" against featured rapper Treach from Naughty by Nature. During the chorus, Aaliyah and Treach engage in a "cute back-and-forth". The fifth track "If Your Girl Only Knew" is a funk, pop, and hip-hop song described by Connie Johnson from the Los Angeles Times as "teasingly witchy". On the track, Aaliyah "chide[s] a man for hitting on her when he already has a girlfriend", against heavy keyboard and organ instrumentation interspersed with live drums and a thumping bassline. The sixth and seventh tracks "Choosey Lover (Old School/New School)" and "Got to Give It Up" are both covers, of songs originally performed by the Isley Brothers and Gaye, respectively. The former "mimics the 1983 original faithfully" for the first four minutes before transitioning into a contemporary-styled remix outro. On the latter, Aaliyah places her falsetto "toe to toe against the liquid overlapping rhyme scheme of hip hop's ultimate storyteller Slick Rick". On "4 Page Letter", Aaliyah tells her "crush to keep an eye out for the mailman" because she has sent him a love letter, while recalling and following her parents' advice.

Dean Van Nguyen from The Independent described the ninth track "Everything's Gonna Be Alright" as a "carefree anthem for the summertime block party". Subsequent tracks "Giving You More" and the Tavarius Polk-assisted duet "Never Givin' Up" lyrically see Aaliyah portraying a "reassuring lover". "I Gotcha' Back" is a "jeep-friendly" mid-tempo G-funk song containing an interpolation of "Lean on Me" by Bill Withers. The track showcases Aaliyah promising devotion to her potential boyfriend: "When no one else is there / With me you can chill". The jungle-inspired ballad "Heartbroken" features drums that fill out space in between the low, shifting two-tone synth hums. Like its successor "Never Comin' Back", it depicts Aaliyah opposing a negligent lover. The latter features Timbaland "aping the sound of a live band vamping on a laid back groove" as Aaliyah performs a "call-and-response harmony routine with an imaginary concert audience over canned crowd noise". "The One I Gave My Heart To" is a pop-R&B power ballad highlighting the protagonist's vulnerability over heartbreak and betrayal.

== Marketing ==
=== Imagery ===
The cover artwork and overall packaging for One in a Million were photographed by Marc Baptiste, who had previously photographed Aaliyah's cover shoot for Seventeen. After the Seventeen shoot, the two crossed paths again, after mutual friend Kidada Jones introduced them at The Mercer Hotel. A month later, they met to discuss possible concepts for the artwork and after hearing his ideas, Aaliyah decided that she wanted to work with him. The 14-hour photo shoot for One in a Million occurred at various locations throughout New York City, with the cover itself being photographed at the Canal Street station late into the session. Baptiste wanted the concept for the artwork to have a "street-chic vibe", as he wanted Aaliyah to have realism and be "more approachable to an audience". The finished product saw Aaliyah staring down the camera, while wearing a power jacket and silver-rimmed glasses.

Numerous critics recognized Aaliyah's progressively mature image during the promotional cycle for One in a Million in the music video for its titular track.

In an effort to generate visual awareness for One in a Million, Blackground Records ran advertisements on cable channels such as BET and The Box from June 24 to August 6, 1996, while the music video for lead single "If Your Girl Only Knew" premiered on July 8. Immediately afterwards, the label launched a vigorous print advertisement campaign, featuring Aaliyah in publications such as Hits, Seventeen, The Source, Sister 2 Sister, and YSB. Due to Aaliyah's outstanding academic performance in high school, Blackground planned to run advertisements in educational teen publication React, and a series of public service announcements regarding breast cancer screenings and crusades against Alzheimer's disease.

Throughout the promotional cycle for One in a Million, Aaliyah adapted a more mature and feminine image as opposed to her previous tomboy style, a switch quickly noticed by the public. She incorporated slimmer garments, such as bra tops, into her style alongside her signature "sweeping deep-parted bang" hairstyle, which heavily contrasted the loose-fitting, baggy and masculine clothing she sported while promoting Age Ain't Nothing but a Number. Furthermore, she became the face of Tommy Hilfiger's Tommy Jeans advertising campaign upon the release of One in a Million, and frequently wore the label's clothing items while promoting the album.

Aaliyah's image progression was displayed in the accompanying music videos for singles from One in a Million, which journalist Christopher John Farley observed were thematically more based on particular moods, rather than storylines, referring to them as "lushly shot and infused with sexual tension, though not in overt and obvious ways". The videos for "If Your Girl Only Knew" and "One in a Million" have been credited for establishing Aaliyah's signature image, as they depict her wearing provocative dark leather outfits and engaging in more sensual choreography. Responding to MTV's comment on her being "all grown up and steamy" in the latter, Aaliyah stated: "[As] far as it being sexy, I would prefer to say sensual. Sensual is being in tune with your sensual self. Sexy, I mean that's in the eye of the beholder, such as beauty is in the eye of the beholder." In the video for "Got to Give It Up", Aaliyah is shown performing the song alongside a hologram of its original performer Marvin Gaye. The lyrical theme of "4 Page Letter" is reprised in its accompanying video, set in a forest, with Aaliyah secretly watching her love interest and coming to his aid as he faces trouble. "The One I Gave My Heart To" sees Aaliyah emotionally perform the song in different settings, including a rain shower, which heavily contrasts its counterpart "Hot Like Fire", which depicts her energetically performing on a pyrotechnics-infused stage; the juxtaposition of the songs' lyrical, musical and visual themes is further highlighted on the double A-side single cover.

=== Release and promotion ===
One in a Million was first released in France on August 13, 1996, before being released in the US two weeks later, by Blackground and Atlantic Records. The release was preceded by the lead single "If Your Girl Only Knew", released on July 15, which peaked at number 11 on the US Billboard Hot 100. In support of the album, Aaliyah embarked on an international promotional tour from August to September, touring the US, the UK, Germany, South Africa, and Japan. On September 14, Aaliyah made an appearance at MTV's sixth annual Rock N' Jock event, which aired on October 26, participating in a celebrity basketball game and performing "If Your Girl Only Knew" during the halftime show. She also performed the song on Soul Train on October 11. To promote One in a Million internationally, "Got to Give It Up" was released as the second single on November 4, while Aaliyah made an appearance on The O-Zone on October 24, and on Sky One's "The Hit Mix" on November 2, both in the UK. "One in a Million" was simultaneously released as the second US single, peaking at number 25 on the US Radio Songs and atop the US R&B/Hip-Hop Airplay. (Note: Prior to Billboard's issue dated December 5, 1998, singles were not eligible to enter the Billboard Hot 100 and the Hot R&B/Hip-Hop Songs unless they were released on a commercially available format. "One in a Million" and "4 Page Letter" were both radio-only singles, thus were eligible to enter only airplay charts. "Hot Like Fire" was also ineligible to enter the Billboard Hot 100 and the Hot R&B/Hip-Hop Songs due to being inferior to its counterpart "The One I Gave My Heart To" airplay-wise, which helped determine which song from a double A-side single would be eligible to chart at the time.) Aaliyah performed the song on Live with Regis and Kathie Lee on February 14, on The Tonight Show with Jay Leno on February 18, with "If Your Girl Only Knew" on Showtime at the Apollo on February 21, and at the annual MTV Spring Break event in March. She had also made an appearance on the Fox television series New York Undercover's as a musical guest, performing "Choosey Lover (Old School/New School)"; the episode aired on January 16, 1997, her 18th birthday. "4 Page Letter" was released as the fourth single from One in a Million on April 8, peaking at number 59 on the US Radio Songs.

Throughout the summer of 1997, Aaliyah performed at KUBE 93 FM and KKBT's annual Summer Jam concerts. She continued promoting One in a Million with televised performances, performing "Hot Like Fire" on the short-lived talk show Vibe, where she gave the show's host a gift basket filled with promotional items, and "One in a Million" on the Nickelodeon sketch comedy show All That. After a tour co-headlined with Az Yet and Foxy Brown failed to come to fruition, Aaliyah embarked on a nationwide tour co-headlined with Dru Hill, Ginuwine, Bone Thugs-n-Harmony, and Mary J. Blige; the tour commenced on August 28, 1997, in Buffalo, New York, and ended on October 5 in Phoenix, Arizona. On September 16, "The One I Gave My Heart To" and "Hot Like Fire" were released as the double A-side fifth and final single from One in a Million. The former peaked at number nine on the Billboard Hot 100, becoming the highest-peaking single from One in a Million, while the latter was ineligible to chart. Aaliyah performed "The One I Gave My Heart To" on The Keenen Ivory Wayans Show on October 6, 1997, at Nickelodeon's fourth annual The Big Help event on October 19, and on the BET talk show Planet Groove on November 26. She subsequently performed at the UNICEF Gift of Song benefit gala, which aired live on TNT on December 10, and on the annual television special Christmas in Washington.

In August 2021, it was reported that Aaliyah's post-Jive recordings would be re-released on physical and digital formats—and be made available on streaming services for the first time—in a deal between Blackground (since rebranded as Blackground Records 2.0) and Empire Distribution. One in a Million was reissued on August 20, despite Aaliyah's estate issuing a statement in response to Blackground's announcement, denouncing the "unscrupulous endeavor to release Aaliyah's music without any transparency or full accounting to the estate".

== Critical reception ==
Professional ratings
Review scores
Source	Rating
AllMusic	4.5/5 stars
Christgau's Consumer Guide	(choice cut)
The Encyclopedia of Popular Music	3/5 stars
Los Angeles Times	3.5/4 stars
Muzik	3.5/5 stars
Pitchfork	8.6/10
Q	3/5 stars
Slant Magazine	3.5/5 stars
The Sydney Morning Herald	3/5 stars
Tom Hull	B+

On release, One in a Million was met with generally favorable reviews from music critics. Writing for AllMusic, Leo Stanley viewed the album as a significant improvement over Age Ain't Nothing but a Number, noting a larger variety of material and producers, and described Aaliyah's vocal performance as "smoother, more seductive, and stronger than before". Her vocal progression was also met with acclaim from MTV, whose editor noted she "glides easily between vocal ranges". Peter Miro from Cash Box praised Aaliyah for her equal ability in executing different musical styles, listing "A Girl Like You", "If Your Girl Only Knew", and the titular track as highlights. Connie Johnson of the Los Angeles Times shared Miro's sentiments, commending the range "from the teasingly witchy 'If Your Girl Only Knew' to the gently poignant '4 Page Letter'", further praising Aaliyah's self-assurance and the record's diverse production. An editor of People also exalted the album's sonic heterogeneity and Aaliyah's vocal performance, ultimately declaring she managed to live up to the album's title. Dream Hampton agreed, writing in her review for Vibe that Aaliyah's "deliciously feline" voice had the same "pop appeal" as Janet Jackson's and is complemented by the "solid and supportive" production.

J.D. Considine from The Baltimore Sun felt One in a Million rarely gave Aaliyah a chance to exhibit her vocal strengths, but praised her performance on "Choosey Lover (Old School/New School)", which she "handles with precisely the sort of suave assurance the song demands." A reviewer for Q wrote: "With her smooth, sweetly seductive vocal firmly to the fore, [Aaliyah] works through a set of predominantly slow and steamy swingbeat numbers, all clipped beats, luxurious melodies and dreamy harmonies". A staff member from The Source praised the album for differentiating from most sophomore album attempts. Writing for The Village Voice, Robert Christgau was less enthusiastic and named only "Got to Give It Up" as a "choice cut", calling it "a good song on an album that isn't worth your time or money". One in a Million was nominated for Favorite Female R&B Album at the 1997 Blockbuster Entertainment Awards, and for Best R&B/Soul Album – Female at the 1997 Soul Train Music Awards. The album's titular track was nominated for Best R&B/Soul Single – Female at the 1998 Soul Train Music Awards.

Retrospectively, One in a Million has been listed among the best recordings of its era and genre by numerous publications. In 2007, Vibe included the album on its commemorative listing "The 150 Albums That Define the Vibe Era", praising Aaliyah as an accomplished vocalist but criticizing the album's songwriting. Rolling Stone ranked it at number 90 on their ranking "100 Best Albums of the '90s", emphasizing Aaliyah's increasingly lascivious artistry. Spin listed it among the 300 best albums of 1985–2014, with editor Andrew Unterberger writing that Aaliyah emerged as a "cool but approachable, guarded but not jaded, and ever so funky" artist on One in a Million in the aftermath of the turmoil which had preceded it. Complex declared the album the seventh best R&B album of the 1990s; editor Ross Scarano called it "the definitive account of Aaliyah and Timbaland's collective brilliance". Including it on Okayplayer's listing "The 19 Most Influential R&B Albums of '90s", Dashan Smith stated that the record "sparked an electronic revolution" for the remainder of the 1990s. It was placed at number 314 on the 2020 edition of Rolling Stone's 500 Greatest Albums of All Time, with the publication praising Aaliyah's vocal performance and the record's innovative production. In 2022, Pitchfork named One in a Million the 15th best album of the 1990s, with the editor Julianne Escobedo Shepherd hailing the album as "the sound of [Aaliyah] gaining her agency as a young woman and changing the course of music history".

== Commercial performance ==
In the US, One in a Million debuted at number 20 on the Billboard 200 chart dated September 14, 1996, selling 40,500 copies during its first week. The record's highest single-week sales were during the Christmas week of 1996, when it sold 71,000 copies, before reaching its original peak of number 18 on February 1, 1997. The album debuted at number four on the Top R&B/Hip-Hop Albums, peaking at number two in its 22nd week and spending a total of 72 weeks on the chart. One in a Million eventually went on to be certified double platinum by the RIAA on June 16, selling 1,100,000 copies that year alone. According to Nielsen SoundScan, the album had sold over three million copies by July 2001; it also sold 756,000 units via BMG Music Club, which were not counted by Nielsen SoundScan. After Aaliyah's death on August 25, 2001, One in a Million debuted atop the US Top Catalog Albums, spending four weeks at the summit. (Note: Billboard's rules at the time forbade albums older than 18 months, such as One in a Million, to re-enter the Billboard 200, hence it was eligible to enter only the Top Catalog Albums.) Following its 2021 reissue, the album reached the top ten on the Billboard 200 for the first time ever, peaking at number 10 with 26,000 album-equivalent units; (Note: The album-equivalent units included pure album sales of 13,000 units, streaming-equivalent albums (SEA) of 11,000 units (equaling 14.29 million on-demand streams of the album's tracks), and track-equivalent albums (TEA) of 2,000 units.) it has spent a total of 68 weeks on the chart.

In Canada, One in a Million debuted at number 35 on RPM Top Albums/CDs chart on September 9, 1996, reaching its peak at number 33 the following week. In total, the album spent nine consecutive weeks on the chart. On May 28, 1997, it was certified gold by Music Canada for shipments of 50,000 copies in the country. In the UK, One in a Million debuted and peaked at numbers 33 and three on the UK Albums Chart and the UK R&B Albums Chart, respectively, on September 7, 1996. It was eventually certified gold by the British Phonographic Industry (BPI) for 100,000 copies shipped in the UK. Following its 2021 reissue, One in a Million re-entered the UK R&B Albums Chart at number eight. In Japan, the album peaked at number 36 on the Oricon Albums Chart and received a gold certification from the Recording Industry Association of Japan (RIAJ). As of August 2011, One in a Million has sold over eight million copies worldwide.

== Legacy ==
"Aside from its clever combination of electronica and R&B, [One in a Million] also heralded the arrival of Aaliyah [the] Music Video Star. Similar to Madonna and Janet, Aaliyah's brand of masculine appeal laced with feminine sensuality came to life in a deluge of MTV [visuals] that played out like sci-fi epics. "

— Idolator writer Jordan Simon discussing the multifaceted impact of One in a Million.

Music journalists have credited One in a Million for continuously influencing R&B and pop music decades after its release. Sal Cinquemani from Slant Magazine called it "undoubtedly one of the most influential R&B albums of the '90s". Tom Breihan from Stereogum stated that "it helped introduce a whole new herky-jerk electronic take on R&B that marked a near-complete break from everything that had come before". Briefly discussing the album, Kelefa Sanneh of The New York Times said Timbaland's "computer-programmed beats fitted perfectly with her cool, breathy voice to create a new kind of electronic music"." In 2016, Jordan Simon from Idolator wrote: "It's clear the album's deft combination of electronic and R&B set a precedent for the music of this decade, sitting comfortably on a shelf alongside recent releases from Kelela, FKA Twigs and Nao". Simon also considered "the foresight and risk-taking" on the album as a precursor to the experimentation found on Aaliyah (2001). Refinery29's Kenneth Partridge said One in a Million had "a spacey, sexy vibe that influenced a generation of soul singers and indie rockers alike". Ross Scarano from Complex noted that its influence can be found in modern R&B, hip-hop, and electronic dance music. Slate writer Dee Lockett stated the album "was unlike anything on the radio at the time, and it inspired a major redirection throughout R&B, helping to bring the genre into the spotlight once again"; she further credited the album for introducing experimental R&B, thus influencing artists such as Drake, Frank Ocean, SZA, and Jhené Aiko.

In retrospective commentaries, critics have emphasized the impact One in a Million had on Aaliyah's artistry and career. Brandon Caldwell from Entertainment Weekly wrote that she managed to create a singular identity detached from past controversies and become "the face of a new generation of effortlessly cool performers" with the album. Writing for the music website Albumism, Steven E. Flemming Jr. asserted One in a Million cemented Aaliyah's status as a viable recording artist alongside peers Brandy and Monica, and called it "a transitional effort that marked a move toward artistic independence and a renewed, worldly purview". Flemming, like some other critics, also compared Aaliyah's trajectory surrounding One in a Million to that of Jackson. The album has also been credited with elevating Elliott and Timbaland's respective careers, as they both enjoyed immense commercial success, as well as influencing mainstream music trends, in the years following the release. Cinquemani stated it established "Aaliyah and the Timbo family as undeniable hip-hop forces", while Keith Harris reflected in The New Rolling Stone Album Guide (2004): "If more critics had attuned their ears to the smooth, just-ever-so offbeat One in a Million, Missy Elliott's Supa Dupa Fly might have not seemed like such a shock."

== Track listing ==
One in a Million
No.	Title	Writer(s)	Producer(s)	Length
1.	"Beats 4 da Streets" (Intro) (featuring Missy Elliott)	Elliott; Tim Mosley	Timbaland	2:10
2.	"Hot Like Fire"	Elliott; Mosley	Timbaland	4:23
3.	"One in a Million"	Elliott; Mosley	Timbaland	4:30
4.	"A Girl Like You" (featuring Treach)	KayGee; Darren Lighty; Renee A. Neufville	KayGee; Lighty	4:23
5.	"If Your Girl Only Knew"	Elliott; Mosley	Timbaland	4:50
6.	"Choosey Lover (Old School/New School)"	Ernie Isley; Marvin Isley; O'Kelly Isley Jr.; Ronald Isley; Rudolph Isley; Chris Jasper	Vincent Herbert^{[a]}; Rashad Smith^{[b]}	7:07
7.	"Got to Give It Up" (featuring Slick Rick)	Marvin Gaye; Slick Rick	Herbert; Craig King	4:41
8.	"4 Page Letter"	Elliott; Mosley	Timbaland	4:52
9.	"Everything's Gonna Be Alright"	Rodney Jerkins; Japhe Tejeda	Jerkins	4:50
10.	"Giving You More"	J. Dibbs	Dibbs	4:26
11.	"I Gotcha' Back"	Jermaine Dupri; Carl-So-Lowe	Dupri; Carl-So-Lowe	2:54
12.	"Never Givin' Up" (featuring Tavarius Polk)	Monica Payne; King	Herbert; King	5:11
13.	"Heartbroken"	Elliott; Mosley	Timbaland	4:17
14.	"Never Comin' Back"	Elliott; Mosley	Timbaland	4:06
15.	"Ladies in da House" (featuring Missy Elliott and Timbaland)	Elliott; Mosley	Timbaland	4:20
16.	"The One I Gave My Heart To"	Diane Warren	Daryl Simmons	4:30
17.	"Came to Give Love" (Outro) (featuring Timbaland)		Timbaland	1:40
Total length:				73:10

Japanese edition
No.	Title	Writer(s)	Producer(s)	Length
18.	"No Days Go By"	King; Rheji Burrell; Aaliyah Haughton	Herbert; Burrell; King	4:41
Total length:				77:51

International limited edition
No.	Title	Writer(s)	Producer(s)	Length
18.	"Come Over" (featuring Tank)	Johntá Austin	Bryan-Michael Cox; Kevin Hicks; Jazze Pha	3:55
Total length:				77:05

=== Notes ===
- ^{^a} also an additional producer
- ^{^b} signifies an additional producer
- 2021 digital edition includes Timbaland's Groove mix of "Hot Like Fire".

Sample credits

- "A Girl Like You" contains a sample from "Summer Madness" by Kool & the Gang.
- "Heartbroken" contains a sample from "Inside My Love" by Minnie Riperton.
- "I Gotcha' Back" contains an interpolation from the song "Lean on Me" by Bill Withers.
- "Never Givin' Up" contains an interpolation from the song "I've Got an Angel" by The Clark Sisters.

== Personnel ==
Credits are adapted from the liner notes of One in a Million.

- Aaliyah – backing vocals (all tracks), lead vocals (all tracks), vocal arrangement (track 7)
- Marc Baptiste – photography
- Carlton Batts – mastering
- Thomas Bricker – art direction
- Ricky Brown – mixing (track 10)
- Carl-So-Lowe – production (track 11), songwriting (track 11)
- Al Carter – project coordination
- Paulinho da Costa – percussion (track 7)
- David de la Cruz – styling
- J. Dibbs – mixing (track 10), production (track 10), songwriting (track 10), vocal arrangement (track 10)
- Pat Dillett – engineering (track 4)
- Jimmy Douglas – engineering (tracks 2, 3, 5, 8, 14 and 15), mixing (tracks 2, 3, 5, 8 and 13–15)
- Jermaine Dupri – mixing (track 11), production (track 11), songwriting (track 11)
- Missy Elliott – backing vocals (tracks 1–3, 5, 8, 13 and 15), lead vocals (tracks 1 and 15), songwriting (tracks 1–3, 5, 8 and 13–15), vocal arrangement (tracks 2, 3, 5, 8, 13 and 15)
- Ronnie Garrett – bass (track 16)
- Ben Garrison – engineering (tracks 6, 7 and 12), mixing (tracks 6, 7 and 12)
- Marvin Gaye – songwriting (track 7)
- Mark Goodman – remix engineering (track 6)
- Franklyn Grant – mixing (track 9)
- Barry Hankerson – creative consultation, management consultation
- Dianne Hankerson – hair styling
- Jomo Hankerson – executive production
- Shanga Hankerson – project coordination
- Melanie Harris – make-up
- Xavier Harris – backing vocals (track 12)
- Demetrius Hart – backing vocals (track 12)
- Michael Haughton – executive production
- Pierre Heath – backing vocals (track 12)
- Vincent Herbert – additional production (track 6), mixing (tracks 7 and 12), production (tracks 6, 7 and 12), remix production (track 6)
- Ernie Isley – songwriting (track 6)
- Marvin Isley – songwriting (track 6)
- O'Kelly Isley Jr. – songwriting (track 6)
- Ronald Isley – songwriting (track 6)
- Rudolph Isley – songwriting (track 6)
- Chris Jasper – songwriting (track 6)
- Rodney Jerkins – backing vocals (track 9), instrumentation (track 9), mixing (track 9), production (track 9), songwriting (track 9)
- Craig Kallman – executive production
- KayGee – mixing (track 4), production (track 4), songwriting (track 4)
- Thom "TK" Kidd – engineering (track 16), mixing (track 16)
- Carol Kim – project coordination
- Craig King – engineering (track 12), production (tracks 6, 7 and 12), remix vocal arrangement (track 6), songwriting (track 12), vocal arrangement (tracks 6, 7 and 12)
- Darren Lighty – mixing (track 4), production (track 4), songwriting (track 4)
- Renee A. Neufville – songwriting (track 4)
- Chuck Nice – engineering (track 7)
- Monica Payne – songwriting (track 12)
- Tavarius Polk – backing vocals (track 12), lead vocals (track 12)
- Michael J. Powell – guitar (track 6)
- Mike Rew – engineering (track 9)
- Daryl Simmons – acoustic guitar (track 16), drum programming (track 16), keyboards (track 16), production (track 16)
- Ivy Skoff – production coordination (track 16)
- Slick Rick – backing vocals (track 7), lead vocals (track 7)
- Rashad Smith – production (track 6), remix production (track 6)
- Sound Boy – engineering (track 13)
- Sebrina Swaby – project coordination
- Phil Tan – engineering (track 11), mixing (track 11)
- Tann – backing vocals (track 16)
- Japhe Tejeda – songwriting (track 9)
- Timbaland – backing vocals (tracks 2, 3, 5, 8 and 13), lead vocals (tracks 15 and 17), mixing (tracks 2, 3, 5, 8, 13 and 14), production (tracks 1–3, 5, 8, 13–15 and 17), songwriting (tracks 1–3, 5, 8 and 13–15)
- Treach – backing vocals (track 4), lead vocals (track 4)
- Diane Warren – songwriting (track 16)
- Freddie Washington – bass (track 7)

== Charts ==
=== Weekly charts ===
1996–1997 weekly chart performance
Chart	Peak position
Australian Albums (ARIA)	93
Australian Dance Albums (ARIA)	14
Canada Top Albums/CDs (RPM)	33
Dutch Albums (Album Top 100)	62
Japanese Albums (Oricon)	36
Swedish Albums (Sverigetopplistan)	41
UK Albums (Official Charts)	33
UK R&B Albums (Official Charts)	3
UK Dance Albums (Music Week)	1
US Billboard 200	18
US Top R&B/Hip-Hop Albums (Billboard)	2
US Top 100 Albums (Cashbox)	17

2001 weekly chart performance
Chart	Peak position
US Top Catalog Albums (Billboard)	1

2021–2022 weekly chart performance for the reissue
Chart	Peak position
UK Album Downloads (Official Charts)	18
UK Independent Albums (Official Charts)	49
UK R&B Albums (Official Charts)	8
US Billboard 200	10
US Independent Albums (Billboard)	2
US Top R&B/Hip-Hop Albums (Billboard)	5
US Vinyl Albums (Billboard)	8

=== Year-end charts ===
1996 year-end chart performance
Chart	Position
US Top R&B/Hip-Hop Albums (Billboard)	60

1997 year-end chart performance
Chart	Position
US Billboard 200	44
US Top R&B/Hip-Hop Albums (Billboard)	10

== Certifications ==
Certifications and sales
Region	Certification	Certified units/sales
Canada (Music Canada)	Gold	50,000^{^}
Japan (RIAJ)	Gold	160,000
United Kingdom (BPI)	Gold	100,000^{*}
United States (RIAA)	2× Platinum	3,756,000 (Note: One in a Million had sold three million copies in the United States by July 2001, according to Nielsen SoundScan. However, Nielsen SoundScan does not count sales through clubs such as BMG Music Service, through which the album sold additional 756,000 units.)
Summaries
Worldwide	—	8,000,000
^{*} Sales figures based on certification alone.^{^} Shipments figures based on certification alone.

== Release history ==
Release dates and formats
Region	Date	Edition(s)	Format(s)	Label(s)	Ref.
France	August 13, 1996	Standard	CD	East West	
United Kingdom	August 26, 1996	Standard	Cassette; CD; vinyl	Blackground; Atlantic	
United States	August 27, 1996	Standard	Cassette; CD	Blackground; Atlantic	
Japan	September 10, 1996	Standard	CD	East West	
Germany	February 23, 2004	Limited	CD	Edel	
Australia	May 2, 2005	Limited	CD	Shock	
France	October 16, 2007	Limited	CD	Geffen	
Various	August 20, 2021	Reissue	Digital download; streaming	Blackground; Empire	
United States	August 20, 2021	Reissue	Box set; cassette; CD	Blackground; Empire	
Japan	November 27, 2021	Reissue	CD	Ultra-Vybe	
United States	August 5, 2022	Reissue	Vinyl	Blackground; Empire	
