= Aaliyah discography =

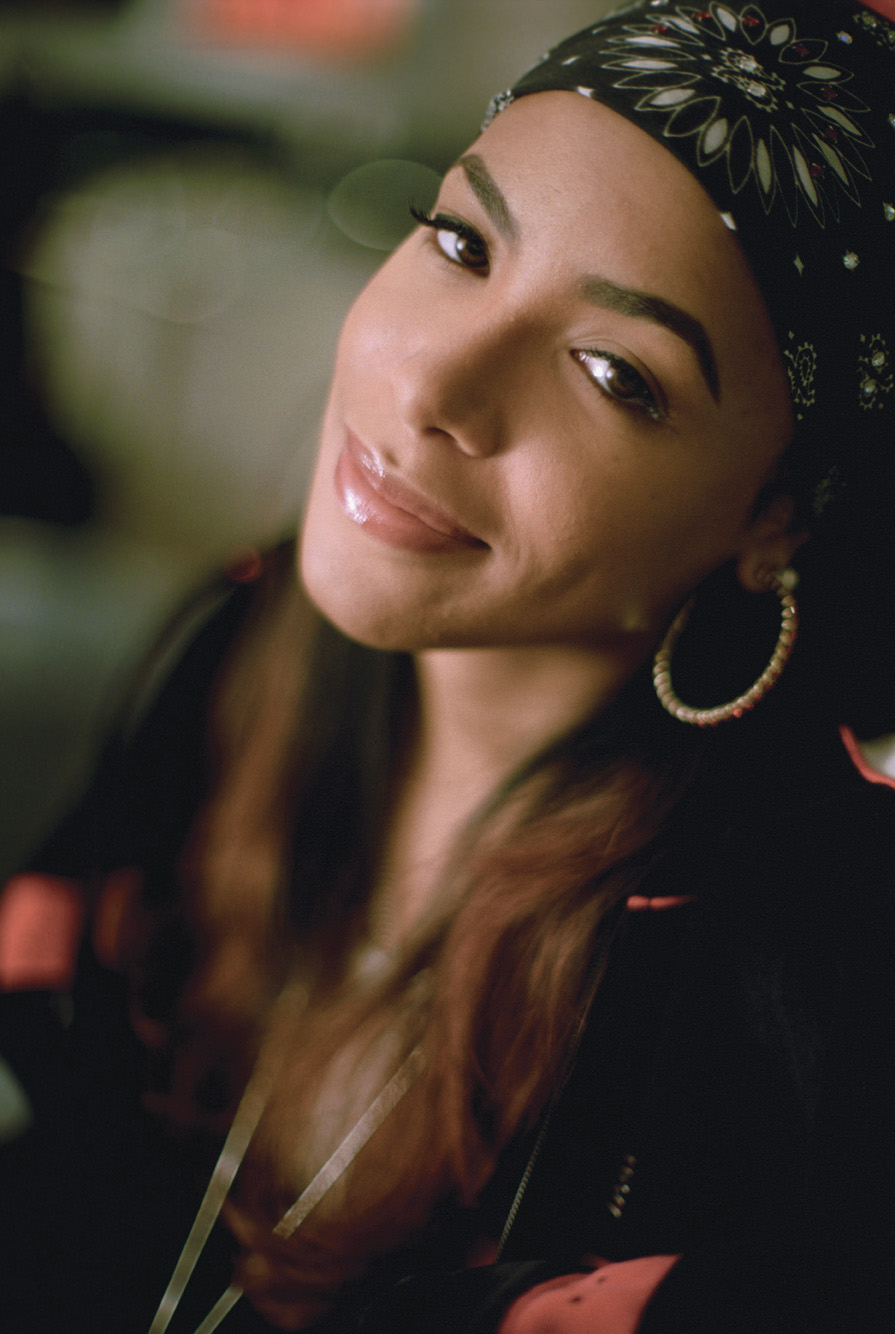
- Studio albums: 3
- Soundtrack albums: 9
- Compilation albums: 3
- Singles: 31
- Promotional singles: 1
- Video albums: 3
- Music videos: 21

American singer Aaliyah released three studio albums, two compilation albums, and 32 singles. Aaliyah was born in Brooklyn, New York City and was raised in Detroit, Michigan. At age 10, she appeared on Star Search and performed in concert alongside Gladys Knight. At age 12, Aaliyah signed a deal with Jive Records and Blackground Records. During that time, she met R. Kelly through her uncle Barry Hankerson; eventually, he became her mentor, sole lead songwriter, and producer for her debut album. Released in 1994, Aaliyah's debut album, Age Ain't Nothing but a Number, was certified double Platinum by the Recording Industry Association of America (RIAA) and sold three million copies in the United States. Months after the release of her album, Aaliyah ended her contract with Jive and signed with Atlantic Records due to allegations of an illegal marriage with Kelly.

In 1996, Aaliyah worked with unknown record producers Timbaland and Missy Elliott for her second album, One in a Million. The album was a commercial success selling three million copies in the United States and over eight million worldwide. While working in between albums, she contributed to several movie soundtracks before starring in her debut feature film, Romeo Must Die, in 2000. Aaliyah executive produced the film's soundtrack and contributed four songs, including "Try Again". "Try Again" topped the Billboard Hot 100 solely on radio airplay, making Aaliyah the first artist in Billboard history to achieve this feat. Aaliyah earned a Grammy Award nomination for Best Female R&B Vocalist for the song.

After completing Romeo Must Die, Aaliyah shot her second film Queen of the Damned and released her third and final album, Aaliyah, in 2001. A little over a month after her album's release, Aaliyah died in a plane crash in the Bahamas after filming the music video for her single "Rock the Boat". In the wake of her death, Aaliyah has achieved commercial success with several posthumous releases.

As of December 2008, Aaliyah has sold 8.1 million albums in the United States and an estimated 24 to 32 million albums worldwide. On the Billboard Hot 100, Aaliyah has spent 289 weeks on the chart, while her three studio albums and two compilation albums have spent 202 weeks on the Billboard 200 chart, as of June 2025.

== Albums ==
=== Studio albums ===
List of studio albums, with selected chart positions, sales figures and certifications.
| Title | Album details | Peak chart positions | | | | | | | | | | Sales | Certifications |
| Title | Album details | US | US R&B | AUS | CAN | GER | NLD | NZ | SWE | SWI | UK | Sales | Certifications |
|---|---|---|---|---|---|---|---|---|---|---|---|---|---|
| Age Ain't Nothing but a Number | Released: May 24, 1994 (US); Label: Blackground, Jive; Format: CD, LP, cassette, digital download | 18 | 3 | — | 20 | — | 44 | — | — | — | 23 | US: 3,000,000 (Note: US sales as of July 2001) | RIAA: 2× Platinum; BPI: Gold; MC: Gold |
| One in a Million | Released: August 27, 1996 (US); Label: Blackground, Atlantic; Format: CD, LP, cassette, digital download | 10 | 2 | 93 | 33 | — | 62 | — | 41 | — | 33 | US: 3,000,000^{[T]} | RIAA: 2× Platinum; BPI: Gold; MC: Gold |
| Aaliyah | Released: July 17, 2001 (US); Label: Blackground, Virgin; Format: CD, LP, cassette, digital download | 1 | 2 | 41 | 6 | 9 | 9 | 25 | 23 | 6 | 5 | US: 2,600,000^{[U]}; UK: 303,000 | RIAA: 2× Platinum; ARIA: Gold; BPI: Platinum; BVMI: Gold; MC: Platinum; IFPI SWI: Gold |
"—" denotes a recording that did not chart or was not released in that territory.

=== Compilation albums ===
| Title | Album details | Peak chart positions | | | | | | | | | | Certifications |
| Title | Album details | US | US R&B | AUS | CAN | GER | NLD | NZ | SWE | SWI | UK | Certifications |
|---|---|---|---|---|---|---|---|---|---|---|---|---|
| I Care 4 U | Released: December 10, 2002 (US); Label: Blackground, Universal; Format: CD, LP, cassette, digital download | 3 | 1 | 43 | 25 | 2 | 10 | 10 | 37 | 3 | 4 | RIAA: Platinum; BPI: Gold; MC: Gold; IFPI SWI: Gold |
| Special Edition – Rare Tracks & Visuals | Released: March 30, 2005 (Japan); Label: Avex Trax; Formats: CD+DVD | — | — | — | — | — | — | — | — | — | — | |
| Ultimate Aaliyah | Released: May 10, 2005; Label: Blackground; Formats: CD, digital download | 41 | 21 | 82 | — | — | — | — | — | — | 32 | BPI: Silver; RMNZ: Gold |
"—" denotes a recording that did not chart or was not released in that territory.

== Singles ==
=== As lead artist ===
List of singles, with selected chart positions and certifications, showing year released and originating album.
| Title | Year | Peak chart positions | | | | | | | | | | Certifications | Album |
| Title | Year | US | US R&B | AUS | CAN | GER | NLD | NZ | SCO | SWI | UK | Certifications | Album |
|---|---|---|---|---|---|---|---|---|---|---|---|---|---|
| "Back & Forth" | 1994 | 5 | 1 | 100 | 70 | — | 38 | 48 | 73 | — | 16 | RIAA: Gold; BPI: Silver; RMNZ: Gold | Age Ain't Nothing but a Number |
| "At Your Best (You Are Love)" | 1994 | 6 | 2 | — | 76 | — | 40 | 39 | 90 | — | 27 | RIAA: Gold; RMNZ: Gold | Age Ain't Nothing but a Number |
| "Age Ain't Nothing but a Number" | 1994 | 75 | 35 | — | — | — | — | — | 78 | — | 32 | | Age Ain't Nothing but a Number |
| "Down with the Clique" | 1995 | — | — | — | — | — | — | — | — | — | 33 | | Age Ain't Nothing but a Number |
| "The Thing I Like" | 1995 | — | — | — | — | — | — | — | 86 | — | 33 | | Age Ain't Nothing but a Number and A Low Down Dirty Shame - Soundtrack |
| "If Your Girl Only Knew" | 1996 | 11 | 1 | — | — | — | — | 20 | 85 | — | 15 | | One in a Million |
| "Got to Give It Up" (featuring Slick Rick) | 1996 | — | — | — | — | — | — | 34 | 98 | — | 37 | | One in a Million |
| "One in a Million" | 1996 | —^{[B]} | —^{[B]} | 69 | — | — | — | 11 | 85 | — | 15 | RIAA: Gold; RMNZ: Gold | One in a Million |
| "4 Page Letter" | 1997 | —^{[C]} | —^{[C]} | — | — | — | — | 49 | 94 | — | 24 | | One in a Million |
| "The One I Gave My Heart To"^{[D]} | 1997 | 9 | 8 | — | 65 | — | 74 | 28 | 88 | — | 30 | RIAA: Gold | One in a Million |
| "Hot Like Fire"^{[D]} | 1997 | — | —^{[E]} | — | — | — | — | — | 88 | | 30 | | One in a Million |
| "Journey to the Past" | 1998 | —^{[F]} | — | — | — | — | — | — | 35 | — | 22 | | Anastasia - Soundtrack |
| "Are You That Somebody?" | 1998 | 21 | —^{[G]} | — | 11 | 31 | 3 | 1 | 56 | 41 | 11 | RIAA: Gold; BPI: Silver; NVPI: Gold; RMNZ: Platinum | Dr. Dolittle - Soundtrack |
| "I Don't Wanna" | 2000 | 35 | 5 | — | — | — | — | — | — | — | — | | Next Friday Soundtrack and Romeo Must Die - Soundtrack |
| "Try Again" | 2000 | 1 | 4 | 8 | 5 | 5 | 3 | 13 | 26 | 8 | 5 | ARIA: Platinum; BPI: Gold; BVMI: Gold; RMNZ: Platinum | Romeo Must Die - Soundtrack |
| "Come Back in One Piece" (featuring DMX) | 2000 | —^{[H]} | 36 | — | — | — | 59 | — | — | — | — | | Romeo Must Die - Soundtrack |
| "We Need a Resolution" (featuring Timbaland) | 2001 | 59 | 15 | 44 | 26 | 66 | 37 | — | 44 | 56 | 20 | | Aaliyah |
| "Rock the Boat" | 2001 | 14 | 2 | 49 | 63 | 70 | 12 | — | 32 | 59 | 12 | BPI: Silver; RMNZ: Gold | Aaliyah |
| "More Than a Woman" | 2001 | 25 | 7 | 37 | — | 34 | 38 | — | 10 | 16 | 1 | BPI: Silver | Aaliyah |
| "Miss You" | 2002 | 3 | 1 | — | 14 | 8 | 14 | — | — | 15 | 76 | | I Care 4 U |
| "Don't Know What to Tell Ya" | 2003 | — | —^{[I]} | 34 | — | 57 | 57 | — | 49 | 30 | 22 | | I Care 4 U |
| "I Care 4 U" / "Don't Worry" | 2003 | 16 | 3 | — | — | — | — | — | — | — | — | | I Care 4 U |
| "Come Over" | 2003 | 32 | 9 | — | — | — | — | — | — | — | — | | I Care 4 U |
| "Are You Feelin' Me?" | 2005 | — | — | — | — | — | — | — | — | — | — | | Ultimate Aaliyah |
| "Enough Said" (featuring Drake) | 2012 | — | 55 | — | — | —^{[J]} | —^{[K]} | — | — | — | — | | Non-album single |
| "Poison" (featuring the Weeknd) | 2021 | — | —^{[L]} | — | — | — | — | —^{[M]} | × | — | — | | TBA |
| "Gone" (with Tank) | 2025 | — | —^{[N]} | — | — | — | — | — | — | — | — | | TBA |
"—" denotes a recording that did not chart or was not released in that territory. "×" denotes periods where charts did not exist or were not archived.

=== As featured artist ===
| Title | Year | Peak chart positions | | | | | | | | Certifications | Album |
| Title | Year | US | US R&B | US Rap | FRA | NZ | SK | UK | UK R&B | Certifications | Album |
|---|---|---|---|---|---|---|---|---|---|---|---|
| "I Need You Tonight" (Junior M.A.F.I.A. featuring Aaliyah) | 1995 | —^{[O]} | 43 | 12 | — | — | — | 66 | — | | Conspiracy |
| "Live and Die for Hip Hop" (Kris Kross featuring Da Brat, Jermaine Dupri, Mr. Black and Aaliyah) | 1996 | 72 | 36 | 11 | — | 30 | — | — | — | | Young, Rich & Dangerous |
| "Up Jumps da Boogie" (Timbaland & Magoo featuring Missy Elliott and Aaliyah) | 1997 | 12 | 4 | 1 | — | — | — | — | — | RIAA: Gold | Welcome to Our World |
| "Don't Think They Know" (Chris Brown featuring Aaliyah) | 2013 | 81 | 29 | — | 121 | — | 7 | 94 | 16 | RIAA: Platinum; RMNZ: Gold | X |
"—" denotes a recording that did not chart or was not released in that territory.

=== Promotional singles ===
| Title | Year | US R&B | Album |
|---|---|---|---|
| "Are You Ready" | 1996 | —^{[A]} | Sunset Park - Soundtrack |

== Other charted songs ==
List of songs, with selected chart positions, showing year released and album name.
| Title | Year | Peak chart positions | | | Album |
| Title | Year | US | US R&B | FRA | Album |
|---|---|---|---|---|---|
| "Final Warning" (Ginuwine featuring Aaliyah) | 1999 | — | —^{[P]} | — | 100% Ginuwine |
| "You Won't See Me Tonight" (Nas featuring Aaliyah) | 1999 | —^{[Q]} | 44 | — | I Am... |
| "I Can Be" | 2001 | — | —^{[R]} | — | Aaliyah |
| "I Refuse" | 2001 | — | — | 25 | Aaliyah |
| "Where Could He Be" (featuring Missy Elliott and Tweet) | 2005 | — | —^{[S]} | — | Non-album song |
"—" denotes a recording that did not chart or was not released in that territory.

== Guest appearances ==
List of non-single guest appearances, with other performing artists, showing year released and album name.
| Title | Year | Other performer(s) | Album |
|---|---|---|---|
| "Summer Bunnies" (Summer Bunnies Contest Extended Remix) | 1994 | R. Kelly, Carey Kelly | "Summer Bunnies" single |
| "Your Body's Callin'" (His & Hers Extended Remix) | 1994 | R. Kelly | Remix City, Volume 1 |
| "One in a Million" (Remix) | 1997 | Ginuwine | Sprung soundtrack |
| "Best Friends" | 1997 | Missy Elliott | Supa Dupa Fly |
| "Night Riders" (Remix) | 1997 | Boot Camp Clik | "Night Riders" single |
| "Man Undercover" | 1997 | Timbaland & Magoo, Missy Elliott | Welcome to Our World |
| "Up Jumps da Boogie" (Remix) | 1997 | Timbaland & Magoo, Missy Elliott | Welcome to Our World |
| "One Man Woman" | 1998 | Playa | Cheers 2 U |
| "John Blaze" | 1998 | Missy Elliott | Tim's Bio: Life from da Bassment |
| "Final Warning" | 1999 | Ginuwine | 100% Ginuwine |
| "You Won't See Me Tonight" | 1999 | Nas | I Am... |
| "Stickin' Chickens" | 1999 | Missy Elliott, Da Brat | Da Real World |
| "Turn the Page" | 1999 | —N/a | Music of the Heart soundtrack |
| "Ain't Never" | 2000 | Outsiderz 4 Life | Outsiderz 4 Life |
| "Are You Feelin' Me?" | 2000 | —N/a | Romeo Must Die OST |
| "I Am Music" | 2001 | Timbaland & Magoo, Static Major | Indecent Proposal |
| "Don't Think They Know" | 2005 | Digital Black | Memoirs of a R&B Thug |
| "She Crazy" | 2010 | Rick Ross, Ne-Yo | Ashes to Ashes |
| "Shakin'" | 2015 | Timbaland, Strado | King Stays King |

== Video albums ==
List of video albums with selected chart positions.
| Title | Details | Peaks | | Notes |
| Title | Details | UK DVD | UK Music Video | Notes |
|---|---|---|---|---|
| Aaliyah | Released: 2001; Label: Blackground, Virgin; Format: DVD | 98 | 6 | A bonus DVD featured on select editions of the Aaliyah album (2001). It Includes four music videos and a behind-the-scenes documentary. |
| I Care 4 U | Released: December 10, 2002; Label: Blackground, Universal; Formats: DVD | — | — | A bonus DVD included with the special edition of the I Care 4 U album (2002). It includes nine music videos, behind-the-scenes footage, and the Japananimation commercial for the Aaliyah album. The European edition includes the "Miss You" music video. |
| Ultimate Aaliyah/Special Edition: Rare Tracks & Visuals | Released: 2005; Label: Blackground; Format: DVD | — | — | Features a 60-minute documentary, rare behind the scenes footage, promo video clips, and interviews with Aaliyah, Missy Elliott, P. Diddy, Damon Dash and Timbaland. |
"—" denotes a recording that did not chart or was not released in that territory.

== Music videos ==
| Title | Year | Album | Director |
|---|---|---|---|
| "Back & Forth" | 1994 | Age Ain't Nothing but a Number | Millicent Shelton |
| "At Your Best (You Are Love)" | 1994 | Age Ain't Nothing but a Number | Millicent Shelton |
| "Age Ain't Nothing but a Number" | 1994 | Age Ain't Nothing but a Number | Millicent Shelton |
| "If Your Girl Only Knew" | 1996 | One in a Million | Joseph Kahn |
| "One in a Million" | 1996 | One in a Million | Paul Hunter |
| "Got to Give It Up" (featuring Slick Rick) | 1996 | One in a Million | Paul Hunter |
| "One in a Million" (Remix) (featuring Ginuwine, Timbaland and Missy Elliott) | 1997 | One in a Million | Paul Hunter |
| "4 Page Letter" | 1997 | One in a Million | Daniel Pearl |
| "Hot Like Fire" (Timbaland's Groove Mix) (featuring Timbaland and Missy Elliott) | 1997 | One in a Million | Lance "Un" Rivera |
| "The One I Gave My Heart To" | 1997 | One in a Million | Darren Grant |
| "Journey to the Past" | 1998 | Anastasia OST | Mark Gerard |
| "Are You That Somebody?" | 1998 | Dr. Dolittle OST | Mark Gerard |
| "Try Again" | 2000 | Romeo Must Die OST | Wayne Isham |
| "Come Back in One Piece" (featuring DMX) | 2000 | Romeo Must Die OST | Little X |
| "We Need a Resolution" (featuring Timbaland) | 2001 | Aaliyah | Paul Hunter |
| "More Than a Woman" | 2001 | Aaliyah | Dave Meyers |
| "Rock the Boat" | 2001 | Aaliyah | Hype Williams |
| "I Care 4 U" | 2002 | Aaliyah | Little X |
| "Miss You" | 2002 | I Care 4 U | Darren Grant |
| "Don't Know What to Tell Ya" | 2003 | I Care 4 U | Marlon Bos |
| "Gone" (with Tank) | 2025 | TBA | N/A |

=== Guest appearances/cameos ===
- "Summer Bunnies" (R. Kelly featuring Aaliyah)
- "Freedom" (Various Artists featuring Aaliyah)
- "I Need You Tonight" (Junior M.A.F.I.A. featuring Aaliyah)
- "One More Chance"/"Stay with Me" (The Notorious B.I.G.) [Cameo]
- "Crush on You" (Lil' Kim featuring Lil' Cease) [Cameo]
- "Up Jumps da Boogie" (Timbaland & Magoo featuring Missy Elliott & Aaliyah)
- "Luv 2 Luv Ya" (Timbaland & Magoo featuring Shaunta Montegomery) [Cameo]
- "Make It Hot" (Nicole Wray featuring Missy Elliott & Mocha) [Cameo]
- "Here We Come" (Timbaland featuring Magoo & Missy Elliott) [Cameo]
- "Holiday" (Naughty by Nature) [Cameo]
- "We at It Again" (Timbaland & Magoo featuring Static & introducing Sebastian) [Cameo]
- "Don't Think They Know" (Chris Brown featuring Aaliyah)

== Notes ==
- A "Are You Ready" did not enter the Hot R&B/Hip-Hop Songs chart, but peaked at number 42 on the Hot R&B/Hip-Hop Airplay chart.
- B "One in a Million" did not enter the Billboard Hot 100, but peaked at number 25 on the Hot 100 Airplay chart. It did not enter the Hot R&B/Hip-Hop Songs chart, but peaked at number 1 on the Hot R&B/Hip-Hop Airplay chart.
- C "4 Page Letter" did not enter the Billboard Hot 100, but peaked at number 55 on the Hot 100 Airplay chart. It did not enter the Hot R&B/Hip-Hop Songs chart, but peaked at number 12 on the Hot R&B/Hip-Hop Airplay chart.
- D "Hot Like Fire" and "The One I Gave My Heart To" charted as a double A-side single in the United Kingdom.
- E "Hot Like Fire" did not enter the Hot R&B/Hip-Hop Songs chart, but peaked at number 31 on the Hot R&B/Hip-Hop Airplay chart.
- F "Journey To The Past" did not enter the Billboard Hot 100, but peaked at number 28 on the US Adult Contemporary Chart.
- G "Are You That Somebody" did not enter the Hot R&B/Hip-Hop Songs chart, but peaked at number 1 on the Hot R&B/Hip-Hop Airplay chart.
- H "Come Back in One Piece" did not enter the Billboard Hot 100, but peaked at number 17 on the Bubbling Under Hot 100 Singles chart, which acts as a 25-song extension to the Hot 100.
- I "Don't Know What to Tell Ya" did not enter the US Hot R&B/Hip-Hop Songs Top 100, but peaked at number 70 on the Hot R&B/Hip-Hop Singles Sales chart on September 27, 2003.
- J "Enough Said" did not enter the mainstream Germany charts, but peaked at number 12 on the Deutsche Urban Chart.
- K In the Netherlands, "Enough Said" did not enter the Dutch Singles Chart, but peaked at number 12 on the Dutch Urban Chart.
- L "Poison" did not enter the Hot R&B/Hip-Hop Songs chart, but peaked at number 15 on the Hot R&B Songs chart.
- M "Poison" did not enter the NZ Top 40 Singles Chart, but peaked at number 33 on the NZ Hot Singles Chart.
- N "Gone" did not enter the US Billboard Hot R&B/Hip Hop chart, but peaked at number one on the Adult R&B Airplay Chart, and at number 13 on the R&B/Hip Hop Airplay chart.
- O "I Need You Tonight" did not enter the Billboard Hot 100, but peaked at number 3 on the Bubbling Under Hot 100 Singles chart, which acts as a 25-song extension to the Hot 100.
- P "Final Warning" did not enter the Hot R&B/Hip-Hop Songs chart, but peaked at number 23 on the Bubbling Under R&B/Hip-Hop Singles chart, which acts as a 25-song extension to the Hot R&B/Hip-Hop Songs chart.
- Q "You Won't See Me Tonight" did not enter the Billboard Hot 100, but peaked at number 21 on the Bubbling Under Hot 100 Singles chart, which acts as a 25-song extension to the Hot 100.
- R "I Can Be" did not enter the Hot R&B/Hip-Hop Songs chart, but peaked at number 2 on the Bubbling Under R&B/Hip-Hop Singles chart, which acts as a 25-song extension to the Hot R&B/Hip-Hop Songs chart.
- S "Where Could He Be" did not enter the Hot R&B/Hip-Hop Songs chart, but peaked at number 20 on the Bubbling Under R&B/Hip-Hop Singles chart, which acts as a 25-song extension to the Hot R&B/Hip-Hop Songs chart.
- T Aaliyah's second studio album One in a Million, sold an extra 756,000 units through BMG Music club, Nielsen SoundScan does not count albums sold through clubs like the BMG Music Service, which were significantly popular in the 1990s.
- U Aaliyah's eponymous album sold an extra 350,000 units through BMG Music club, Nielsen SoundScan does not count albums sold through clubs like the BMG Music Service, which were significantly popular in the 1990s.
