= List of songs recorded by Aaliyah =

Songs by American singer

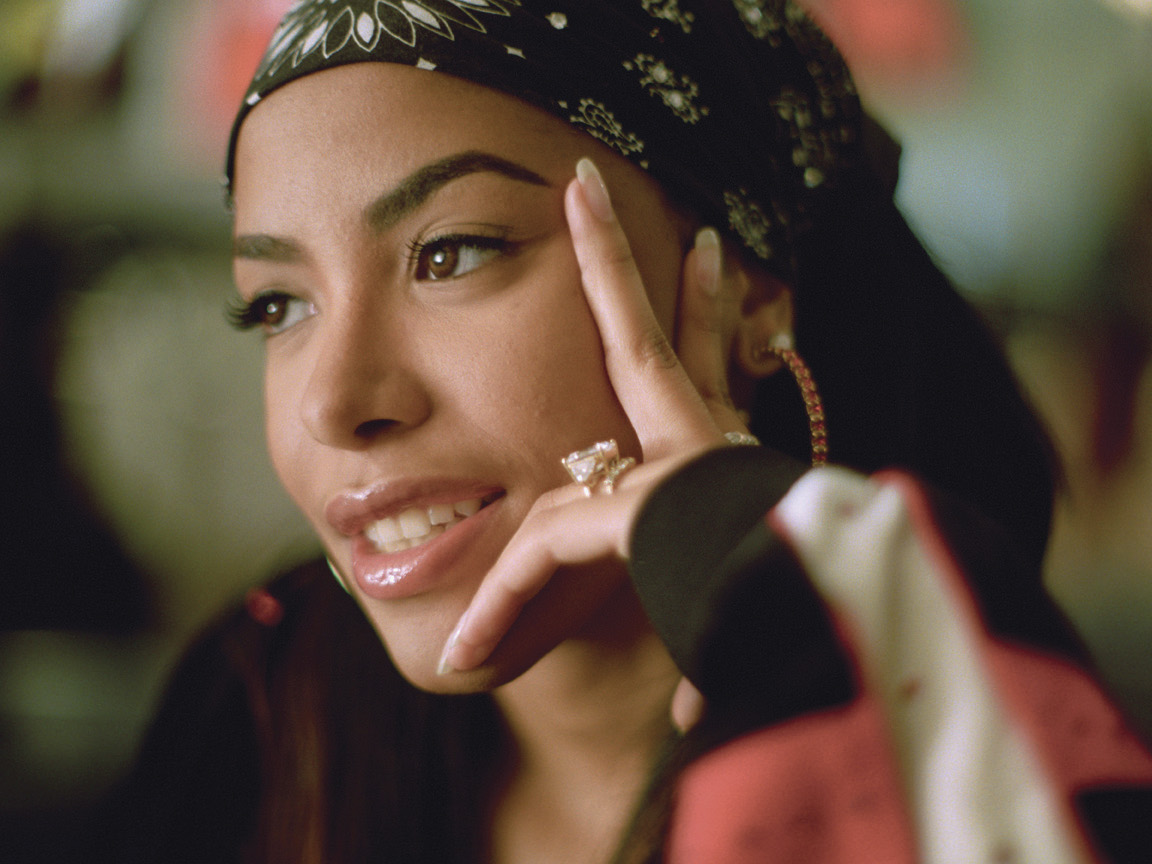
Aaliyah in May 2000

This is an alphabetical list of officially released songs by the late R&B singer Aaliyah (1979–2001).

== Songs ==
Key
| † | Indicates single release |
| ‡ | Indicates song released posthumously |
| # | Indicates single released posthumously |

| Song | Artist(s) | Writer(s) | Album | Year | Ref(s). |
|---|---|---|---|---|---|
| "4 Page Letter" † | Aaliyah | Melissa Elliott; Timothy Mosley | One in a Million | 1996 | |
| "Age Ain't Nothing but a Number" † | Aaliyah | Robert Kelly | Age Ain't Nothing but a Number | 1994 | |
| "Ain't Never" | Outsiderz 4 Life featuring Aaliyah | Alan Healy; Dave Smith; Jason Dowty; Jimmy Marble; Todd White | Unreleased album | 2000 | |
| "All I Need" ‡ | Aaliyah | Johntá Austin | I Care 4 U | 2002 | |
| "Are You Feelin' Me?" | Aaliyah | Melissa Elliott; Timothy Mosley | Romeo Must Die: The Album | 2000 | |
| "Are You Ready" † | Aaliyah | Renne Neuville | Sunset Park: Original Motion Picture Soundtrack | 1996 | |
| "Are You That Somebody?" † | Aaliyah | Static Major; Timothy Mosley | Dr. Dolittle soundtrack | 1998 | |
| "At Your Best (You Are Love)" † | Aaliyah | Chris Jasper; Ernie Isley; Marvin Isley; O'Kelly Isley Jr. Ronald Isley; Rudolph Isley | Age Ain't Nothing but a Number | 1994 | |
| "Back & Forth" † | Aaliyah | Robert Kelly | Age Ain't Nothing but a Number | 1994 | |
| "Beats 4 da Streets (Intro)" | Aaliyah featuring Missy Elliott | Melissa Elliott; Timothy Mosley | One in a Million | 1996 | |
| "Best Friends" | Missy Elliott featuring Aaliyah | Melissa Elliott; Timothy Mosley | Supa Dupa Fly | 1997 | |
| "Came to Give Love (Outro)" | Aaliyah featuring Timbaland | Timothy Mosley | One in a Million | 1996 | |
| "Charge It to the Game" (No Love) | Chris Brown featuring Aaliyah and Static Major | Stephen Garrett | Unreleased album | —N/a | |
| "Choosey Lover (Old School/New School)" | Aaliyah | Chris Jasper; Ernie Isley; Marvin Isley; O'Kelly Isley Jr. Ronald Isley; Rudolph Isley | One in a Million | 1996 | |
| "Come Back in One Piece" † | Aaliyah featuring DMX | Stephen Garrett; Earl Simmons; Irving Lorenzo; Rob Meys; George Clinton; Bernie Worrell; William Collins | Romeo Must Die: The Album | 2000 | |
| "Come Over" # | Aaliyah featuring Tank | Johntá Austin | I Care 4 U | 2002 | |
| "Danc'n" | E.T. Selfish featuring Aaliyah and Digital Black | Benjamin Black | Unreleased album | —N/a | |
| "Death of a Playa" | Aaliyah | Aaliyah Haughton; Rashad Haughton; Timothy Mosley | N/A (Note: Original appearance on the UK single release of "4 Page Letter".) | 1997 | |
| "Don't Know What to Tell Ya" # | Aaliyah | Stephen Garrett; Timothy Mosley | I Care 4 U | 2002 | |
| "Don't Think They Know" ‡ | Digital Black featuring Aaliyah | Benjamin Bush; Verse Simmonds; Tim Kelley; Bob Robinson; Jonathan David Buck | Memoirs of a R&B Thug | 2005 | |
| "Don't Think They Know" # | Chris Brown featuring Aaliyah | Benjamin Bush; Verse Simmonds; Tim Kelley; Bob Robinson; Jonathan David Buck | X | 2014 | |
| "Don't Worry" ‡ | Aaliyah | Johntá Austin | I Care 4 U | 2002 | |
| "Down with the Clique" † | Aaliyah | Robert Kelly | Age Ain't Nothing but a Number | 1994 | |
| "Enough Said" # | Aaliyah featuring Drake | Aaliyah Haughton; Aubrey Graham | Non-album single | 2012 | |
| "Erica Kane" ‡ | Aaliyah | Stephen Garrett | I Care 4 U | 2002 | |
| "Everything's Gonna Be Alright" | Aaliyah | Japhe Tejeda; Rodney Jerkins | One in a Million | 1996 | |
| "Extra Smooth" | Aaliyah | Stephen Garrett; Eric Seats; Rapture Stewart | Aaliyah | 2001 | |
| "Final Warning" | Ginuwine featuring Aaliyah | Stephen Garrett; Timothy Mosley | 100% Ginuwine | 1999 | |
| "Freedom" † | Aaliyah with various artists | Joi Gilliam; Dallas Austin; Diamond D | Panther: Original Motion Picture Soundtrack | 1995 | |
| "A Girl Like You" | Aaliyah featuring Treach | Keir Gist; Darren Lighty | One in a Million | 1996 | |
| "Girlfriends" ‡ | Yaushameen Michael featuring Aaliyah | Stephen Garrett | Unreleased album | 2006 | |
| "Giving Up" ‡ (Note: Cover of Donny Hathaway's version) | Aaliyah | Van McCoy | Unreleased album (Note: Originally set to appear on Sparkle: Original Motion Picture Soundtrack.) | 2005 | |
| "Giving You More" | Aaliyah | Darren Jenkins | One in a Million | 1996 | |
| "Gone" † | Aaliyah with Tank | Stephen Garrett; Tank; Sean Garrett; Azul Wynter | Unstoppable | 2025 | |
| "Got to Give It Up" † | Aaliyah featuring Slick Rick | Marvin Gaye | One in a Million | 1996 | |
| "Heartbroken" | Aaliyah | Melissa Elliott; Timothy Mosley | One in a Million | 1996 | |
| "Hot Like Fire" † | Aaliyah | Melissa Elliott; Timothy Mosley | One in a Million | 1996 | |
| "I Am Music" ‡ | Timbaland & Magoo featuring Aaliyah and Static Major | Timothy Mosley; Stephen Garrett | Indecent Proposal | 2001 | |
| "I Can Be" | Aaliyah | Durrell Babbs; Stephen Anderson | Aaliyah | 2001 | |
| "I Care 4 U" # | Aaliyah | Melissa Elliott; Timothy Mosley | Aaliyah | 2001 | |
| "I Don't Wanna" † | Aaliyah | Johntá Austin; Phalon Anton Alexander; Donnie Scantz; Kevin Hicks | Next Friday: Original Motion Picture Soundtrack | 1999 | |
| "I Gotcha' Back" | Aaliyah | Carl So-Lowe; Jermaine Dupri | One in a Million | 1996 | |
| "I Need You Tonight" † | Junior M.A.F.I.A. featuring Aaliyah | Clark Kent | Conspiracy | 1995 | |
| "I Refuse" | Aaliyah | Stephen Garrett; Jeffrey Walker | Aaliyah | 2001 | |
| "I'm Down" | Aaliyah | Robert Kelly | Age Ain't Nothing but a Number | 1994 | |
| "I'm So into You" | Aaliyah | Robert Kelly | Age Ain't Nothing but a Number | 1994 | |
| "If Your Girl Only Knew" † | Aaliyah | Melissa Elliott; Timothy Mosley | One in a Million | 1996 | |
| "Intro" | Aaliyah | Robert Kelly | Age Ain't Nothing but a Number | 1994 | |
| "It's Whatever" | Aaliyah | Stephen Garrett; Eric Seats; Rapture Stewart | Aaliyah | 2001 | |
| "John Blaze" | Timbaland featuring Aaliyah and Missy Elliott | Timothy Mosley; Melissa Elliott | Tim's Bio: Life from da Bassment | 1998 | |
| "Journey to the Past" † | Aaliyah | Lynn Ahrens; Stephen Flaherty | Anastasia: Music from the Motion Picture | 1997 | |
| "Ladies in da House" | Aaliyah featuring Missy Elliott and Timbaland | Melissa Elliott; Timothy Mosley | One in a Million | 1996 | |
| "Live and Die for Hip Hop" † | Kris Kross featuring Da Brat, Jermaine Dupri, Mr. Black, and Aaliyah | Jermaine Dupri; Mr. Black; Jeffrey E. Cohen; Narada Michael Walden; Shawntae Harris | Young, Rich & Dangerous | 1996 | |
| "Loose Rap" | Aaliyah featuring Static Major | Stephen Garrett; Eric Seats; Rapture Stewart | Aaliyah | 2001 | |
| "Man Undercover" | Timbaland & Magoo featuring Aaliyah and Missy Elliott | Melvin Barcliff; Melissa Elliott; Timothy Mosley | Welcome to Our World | 1997 | |
| "Messed Up" | Aaliyah | Benjamin Bush; Eric Seats; Rapture Stewart | Aaliyah | 2001 | |
| "Miss You" # | Aaliyah | Johntá Austin; Teddy Bishop; Elgin Lumpkin | I Care 4 U | 2002 | |
| "More Than a Woman" † | Aaliyah | Timothy Mosley; Stephen Garrett | Aaliyah | 2001 | |
| "Never Comin' Back" | Aaliyah | Melissa Elliott; Timothy Mosley | One in a Million | 1996 | |
| "Never Givin' Up" | Aaliyah featuring Tavarius Polk | King; Monica Bell | One in a Million | 1996 | |
| "Never No More" | Aaliyah | Stephen Garrett; Stephen Anderson | Aaliyah | 2001 | |
| "Night Riders (Remix)" | Boot Camp Clik featuring Aaliyah | | For the People | 1997 | |
| "No Days Go By" | Aaliyah | Aaliyah Haughton; King; Rheji Burrell | One in a Million (Japan Bonus Track) | 1996 | |
| "No One Knows How to Love Me Quite Like You Do" | Aaliyah | Robert Kelly | Age Ain't Nothing but a Number | 1994 | |
| "Old School" | Aaliyah | Robert Kelly | Age Ain't Nothing but a Number | 1994 | |
| "The One I Gave My Heart To" † | Aaliyah | Diane Warren | One in a Million | 1996 | |
| "One in a Million" † | Aaliyah | Melissa Elliott; Timothy Mosley | One in a Million | 1996 | |
| "One Man Woman" | Playa featuring Aaliyah | Jawann Peacock; Stephen Garrett | Cheers 2 U | 1998 | |
| "Poison" # | Aaliyah featuring the Weeknd | Abel Tesfaye; Ahmad Balshe; Stephen Garrett | Non-album single | 2021 | |
| "Quit Hatin'" ‡ | Aaliyah | Stephen Garrett | Unreleased album | 2013 | |
| "Read Between the Lines" | Aaliyah | Stephen Garrett; Stephen Anderson | Aaliyah | 2001 | |
| "Rock the Boat" † | Aaliyah | Stephen Garrett; Eric Seats; Rapture Stewart | Aaliyah | 2001 | |
| "Shakin'" ‡ | Timbaland featuring Aaliyah and Strado | Stephen Garrett | King Stays King | 2015 | |
| "Steady Ground" ‡ | Aaliyah featuring Static Major | Stephen Garrett; Jeffrey Walker | Unreleased album | 2012 | |
| "Stickin' Chickens" | Missy Elliott featuring Aaliyah and Da Brat | Melissa Elliott; Timothy Mosley; Shawntae Harris | Da Real World | 1999 | |
| "Street Thing" | Aaliyah | Robert Kelly | Age Ain't Nothing but a Number | 1994 | |
| "Summer Bunnies (Contest Extended Remix)" | R. Kelly featuring Aaliyah | Robert Kelly | N/A (Note: Original appearance on the US single release of "Summer Bunnies".) | 1994 | |
| "Talk Is Cheap" | Drake featuring Aaliyah and Static Major | Stephen Garrett; Aubrey Graham | Unreleased album | —N/a | |
| "The Thing I Like" † | Aaliyah | Robert Kelly | Age Ain't Nothing but a Number | 1994 | |
| "Those Were the Days" | Aaliyah | Stephen Garrett; Eric Seats; Rapture Stewart | Aaliyah | 2001 | |
| "Throw Your Hands Up" | Aaliyah | Robert Kelly | Age Ain't Nothing but a Number | 1994 | |
| "Try Again" † | Aaliyah | Stephen Garrett; Timothy Mosley | Romeo Must Die: The Album | 2000 | |
| "Turn the Page" | Aaliyah | Shelly Peiken; Guy Roche | Music of the Heart: The Album | 1999 | |
| "U Got Nerve" | Aaliyah | Benjamin Bush; Eric Seats; Rapture Stewart | Aaliyah | 2001 | |
| "Up Jumps da Boogie" † | Timbaland & Magoo featuring Missy Elliott and Aaliyah | Melissa Elliott; Rod Temperton; Timothy Mosley | Welcome to Our World | 1997 | |
| "We Need a Resolution" † | Aaliyah featuring Timbaland | Timothy Mosley; Stephen Garrett | Aaliyah | 2001 | |
| "What If" | Aaliyah | Durrell Babbs; Stephen Anderson | Aaliyah | 2001 | |
| "Where Could He Be" ‡ | Aaliyah featuring Missy Elliott and Tweet | Melissa Elliott | Unreleased album | 2005 | |
| "You Won't See Me Tonight" | Nas featuring Aaliyah | Nasir Jones; Timothy Mosley | I Am... | 1999 | |
| "You Never Do A Thing For Me" ‡ | Aaliyah | Aaliyah Haughton; Stephen Garrett; Eric Seats; Rapture Stewart | Unreleased album (Note: Originally recorded in April 1999, in preparation for Aaliyah's 2001 album Aaliyah.) | 2025 | |
| "Young Nation" | Aaliyah | Robert Kelly | Age Ain't Nothing but a Number | 1994 | |
| "Your Body's Callin' (His and Hers Remix)" † | R. Kelly featuring Aaliyah | Robert Kelly | N/A (Note: Original appearance on the US single release of "Your Body's Callin'".) | 1994 | |
