= Age Ain't Nothing but a Number (Aaliyah song) =

Single by Aaliyah

from the album Age Ain't Nothing but a Number
- B-side: "I'm Down"; "The Thing I Like"; "Back & Forth"; "At Your Best (You Are Love)"
- Released: December 6, 1994
- Recorded: 1993
- Studio: Chicago Recording Company (Chicago)
- Genre: R&B
- Length: 4:13
- Label: Blackground; Jive
- Songwriter: R. Kelly
- Producer: R. Kelly

Aaliyah singles chronology
"At Your Best (You Are Love)" (1994)	"Age Ain't Nothing but a Number" (1994)	"Down with the Clique" (1995)

Music video
- "Age Ain't Nothing but a Number" on YouTube

"Age Ain't Nothing but a Number" is a song recorded by American singer Aaliyah for her debut studio album of the same name (1994). It was written and produced by R. Kelly and is lyrically about a young girl wanting to date an older man. Containing a lyrical interpolation from the song "What You Won't Do for Love" by Bobby Caldwell, the "soulful" ballad opens with a guitar-piano interplay, with Aaliyah's spoken voice noting her daily diary entry. Blackground Records and Jive Records released "Age Ain't Nothing but a Number" as the third single–and final single in the United States–from Age Ain't Nothing but a Number on December 6, 1994.

Commercially, "Age Ain't Nothing but a Number" performed poorly on the US Billboard Hot 100, peaking at number 75, also peaking at number 35 on the Hot R&B/Hip-Hop Songs. Internationally, it reached the top 40 in the United Kingdom. While the critics were initially positive towards the song, it soon faced controversy when a marriage certificate stating that a 27-year-old R. Kelly had married a 15-year-old Aaliyah emerged; the marriage was quickly annulled. The song is widely considered to be the most controversial part of Aaliyah's discography, and following its release, Aaliyah cut all personal and professional ties with Kelly. The music video for the song was directed by Millicent Shelton and was mainly shot in black-and-white.

== Music and lyrics ==
"Age Ain't Nothing but a Number" was described by The Boombox as a "soulful ballad" with Aaliyah "crooning of longing for an older lover". Tonya Pendleton from The Washington Post, said it was a "seductive entreaty to an older lover to forget their age difference and allow their relationship to ripen". The song opens with "Aaliyah's spoken voice noting her daily diary entry" and it is "coupled with a delicate guitar-piano interplay that echoes the urgency of her performance". It also includes a lyrical interpolation from the song "What You Won't Do for Love" (1978) by Bobby Caldwell. The shifts into the chorus contain "some grace-note exhalations, as attaching 'my' to 'age aint nothing but a number", while Aaliyah's "vocal assertion is breathy, and reassuring, pointedly come-hither in its insistence, and at times maturely deep and almost throaty. Towards the end, the words are said – 'come here', with what then sounds like a kiss".

In his biography Aaliyah (2021), author Tim Footman felt the song "adds more fuel to the controversy, but the story it tells is ambiguous". Footman also noted the lyrics 'tonight we're going to go all the way' makes Aaliyah sound "as if she is the dominant one, she is the one doing the reassuring, guiding a younger lover down the sexual way". He thought that a young girl taking on the role of a "sexually experienced seductress" was a little disturbing and felt that the lyrics by R. Kelly "would have fitted his own erotic persona nicely". Footman concluded his analyses saying, "When put into the mouth of an underaged girl, however it almost seemed as if social and sexual mores were coming under attack. This was emphatically not cotton candy R&B by numbers".

== Critical reception ==
Oliver VanDervoort from AXS thought that despite the lyrical content and it being written/produced by R. Kelly, "The song itself manages to get through the creep factor to qualify as one of her best". When discussing the lyrical content of the song, Kenneth Pathridge from Billboard said, "She sings it not like a love-struck teenager but rather a poised young woman mature enough to handle a relationship with an older man". Damien Scott from Complex said that the song is a "head nod-inducing track with a riding bass line that has a 15-year-old Aaliyah reprising Bobby Caldwell (I got a thing for you, and I won't let go.) to assert her assurance about her forbidden love." He also felt that the song was an important part of Aaliyah's career and that it should not be forgotten.

James Masterton wrote in his weekly UK chart commentary, "The new single moves back into swingbeat territory with the production trademarks of alleged lover R Kelly etched all over it." A reviewer from Music Week gave it three out of five, describing it as "a slow tempo grower". MTV.com felt that "Age Ain't Nothing But A Number" was one of the album's highlights, along with "At Your Best (You Are Love)", "Young Nation, and "Down with the Clique". The New Sunday Times said the song is "an attempt at romance, of which Aaliyah has not experienced personally." Tony Cross from Smash Hits gave it four out of five, writing, "This song is a brilliant piece of swingbeat seduction. It's sexy, at times outrageous, but not too sweaty. This is top-notch lay-dee music, with Aaliyah's lip-smacking vocals caressing the best out of a spine-tingling lazy beat. The best snog-on-a-sofa record for a long time."

== Commercial performance ==
"Age Ain't Nothing but a Number" was the third and final single from Age Ain't Nothing but a Number to be released in the United States. Commercially, the song was the least successful single from the album, only peaking at number 75 on the Billboard Hot 100 on February 25, 1995. The song experienced better success on the US Hot R&B/Hip-Hop Songs, peaking at number 35 on December 24, 1994. On the Rhythmic chart, the song peaked at number 36 on February 18, 1995. In the United Kingdom, the single performed better on the charts, peaking at number 32 on the UK Singles Chart. On the UK Dance Singles Chart, the single peaked at number 19 on March 5, 1995, while peaking at number six on the UK R&B Singles Chart the same week.

== Music video ==
=== Background and release ===
The accompanying music video for "Age Ain't Nothing but a Number" was directed by Millicent Shelton and filmed in Detroit, Michigan in late 1994. Mainly shot in black-and-white, it features cameo appearances by rappers Proof and Bizarre from D12 and Aaliyah's brother, Rashad Haughton. The radio edit, which removes the audio of Aaliyah scribbling in her diary, was used for the video. The video made its television debut on the BET network during the week ending on November 27, 1994. For the week ending on December 17, 1994 the video premiered on The Box. It would later premiere on the MTV network during the week ending on January 8, 1995. The video was later published on Aaliyah's official YouTube channel in October 2009. It has amassed more than 20 million views as of May 2024.

=== Reception ===
Steffanee Wang from Nylon stated "despite its unsettling backstory and origin, this song and its music video remains iconic, with Aaliyah commanding a squadron of friends at a parking lot kickback that looks something straight out of a West Side Story recreation. In her biography Baby Girl: Better Known as Aaliyah (2021) author Kathy Iandoli said the video for "Age Ain't Nothing but a Number", "travels along the same vein" as the video for "At Your Best (You Are Love)", in terms of both incorporating "parking lot posse shots". She also said, that her earlier videos, including "Age Ain't Nothing but a Number, "all have in common the usage of an "vignette effect, where Aaliyah is almost haloed, as the color schemes change from warm earth tone tints to black and white". In the book Diva : feminism and fierceness from pop to hip-hop (2023), the authors thought "the generic video is moody and meaningless, but splits the object of affection across a number of affable-looking male suiters".

== Live performances ==
On January 28, 1995, Aaliyah performed "Age Ain't Nothing but a Number" on the Nickelodeon sketch comedy show All That. Uproxx included Aaliyah's All That performance on their "5 Musical Performances From Nickelodeon's ‘All That’ You Didn't Realize Were Completely Inappropriate" list. While commenting on the performance, Dejen Isaac from Uproxx said: "They changed the most blatant portion a bit (tonight we’re gonna, go "around" the way), but Nickelodeon pretty much aired a song about a teen who wants to bang an older gentleman. That doesn't even take into account that the song was written and produced by R. Kelly, who allegedly tried to marry Aaliyah when she was 16. It's just kinda icky all around". MTV ranked the performance at number four on their "17 'All That' Musical Moments That Will Still Blow Ya Mind" list. Rap-Up included the performance on their "Aaliyah's 10 Greatest Live Performances" list. The publication praised the performance: "Aaliyah allowed none of the cheesiness of Nickelodeon's sketch comedy series to rub off on her when she appeared on the first season in 1994. Singing her debut album's title track, she did so with all the maturity that its lyrics so suspiciously detailed".

== Controversy ==
In May 1997, music publisher Windswept Pacific filed a lawsuit against Aaliyah with the U.S. District Court in Los Angeles. Windswept Pacific claimed she illegally copied Bobby Caldwell's 1978 song "What You Won't Do for Love" and that "Age Ain't Nothing but a Number" bears a striking resemblance to Caldwell's song.

"Age Ain't Nothing but a Number" is Aaliyah's most controversial song within her discography due to its lyrical content about dating someone older. Controversy arose especially due to the song being written and produced by R. Kelly. After the release of the single, a marriage certificate emerged, stating that 15-year-old Aaliyah and 27-year-old Kelly were married.

== Legacy ==
"Age Ain't Nothing but a Number" was included on USA Today's "20 politically incorrect songs that'd be wildly controversial today" list. According to Maeve McDermott and Patrick Ryan from USA Today, "No disrespect to the late Princess of R&B, whose hypnotic vocals and idiosyncratic style remain timeless. But it's hard not to feel at least mildly uncomfortable listening to this song in retrospect: At the time she recorded it, a then-14-year-old Aaliyah was dating — and would soon illegally marry — her mentor/producer R. Kelly, who was 27." Also, the song was included on KQED's "The Most Creepily Problematic Sexy Songs of the 1990s" list. In 2003, rap duo Outkast sampled the song in the beginning of the song "Pink & Blue" from their fifth studio album Speakerboxxx/The Love Below.

== Track listings and formats ==
- US cassette single
1. "Age Ain't Nothing but a Number" (album version) – 4:14
2. "I'm Down" – 3:16
- US maxi CD single
1. "Age Ain't Nothing but a Number" (album version) – 4:14
2. "Age Ain't Nothing but a Number" (no intro) – 4:14
3. "Age Ain't Nothing but a Number" (instrumental) – 4:14
4. "I'm Down" – 3:16
5. "The Thing I Like" – 3:21
- Japanese mini CD single
1. "Age Ain't Nothing but a Number" (album version) – 4:14
2. "Age Ain't Nothing but a Number" (instrumental) – 4:14
- UK 12-inch vinyl
1. "Age Ain't Nothing but a Number" (no intro) – 4:14
2. "Age Ain't Nothing but a Number" (instrumental) – 4:14
3. "Age Ain't Nothing but a Number" (Havok 12" Mix) – 4:15
4. "Age Ain't Nothing but a Number" (Linslee 12" Mix) – 4:25
- UK cassette single
1. "Age Ain't Nothing but a Number" (no intro) – 4:14
2. "Age Ain't Nothing but a Number" (instrumental) – 4:14
- UK maxi CD single
1. "Age Ain't Nothing but a Number" (no intro) – 4:14
2. "Age Ain't Nothing but a Number" (album version) – 4:14
3. "Age Ain't Nothing but a Number" (instrumental) – 4:14
4. "Back & Forth" – 3:51
5. "At Your Best (You Are Love)" – 4:12

== Charts ==
Weekly chart performance for "Age Ain't Nothing but a Number"
Chart (1994–1995)	Peak position
Canada (The Record)	22
Europe (European Dance Radio)	13
Scottish Singles Sales (Official Charts)	78
UK Singles (Official Charts)	32
UK Dance (Official Charts)	19
UK Hip Hop/R&B (Official Charts)	6
UK Club (Music Week)	70
US Billboard Hot 100	75
US Hot R&B/Hip-Hop Songs (Billboard)	35
US Rhythmic Airplay (Billboard)	36

== Release history ==
Release dates and formats for "Age Ain't Nothing but a Number"
Region	Date	Format(s)	Label(s)	Ref.
United States	December 6, 1994	Cassette; maxi CD	Blackground; Jive	
Japan	February 22, 1995	Mini CD	BMG	
United Kingdom	February 27, 1995	12-inch vinyl; cassette; maxi CD	Jive	

== Bibliography ==
- Fairclough, Kristy; Halligan, Benjamin; Rambarran, Shara; Persley, Nicole Hodges (2023). Diva: Feminism and Fierceness from Pop to Hip-Hop. Bloomsbury Publishing. ISBN 9781501368257.
- Footman, Tim (2021). Aaliyah. Plexus Publishing Limited. ISBN 9780859657136.
- Iandoli, Kathy (2021). Baby Girl: Better Known as Aaliyah. Atria Books. ISBN 978-1982156862.
