= No One Knows How to Love Me Quite Like You Do =

Single by Aaliyah

from the album Age Ain't Nothing but a Number
- Released: June 27, 1995
- Recorded: 1993
- Studio: Chicago Recording Company (Chicago, Illinois)
- Genre: R&B; new jack swing
- Length: 4:07 (album); 3:37 (radio)
- Label: Blackground; Jive
- Songwriter(s): R. Kelly
- Producer(s): R. Kelly

Aaliyah singles chronology
"The Thing I Like" (1995)	"No One Knows How to Love Me Quite Like You Do" (1995)	"Are You Ready?" (1996)

"No One Knows How to Love Me Quite Like You Do" is a R&B/hip-hop song performed by Aaliyah and Tia Hawkins. It was released as a promotional airplay single in the U.S. and is the fourth release from Aaliyah's debut album Age Ain't Nothing but a Number.

The single was written and produced by R. Kelly. On "No One Knows How to Love Me Quite Like You Do" Aaliyah tells her lover, no one else knows how to love her quite like he does over a hip hop-styled beat.

== Chart performance ==
"No One Knows How to Love Me Quite Like You Do" remained on the charts for a limited time and charted on the Mediabase mainstream urban chart and peaked at #1. The most spins it received in a week was 1000.
