= One Man Woman =

One Man Woman may refer to:

== Books and film ==
- One-Man Woman, a 1996 romantic novel by Carole Mortimer
- A One Man Woman, a 1925 American comedy short film by Jimmy Callahan
- A One Man Woman, a 1991 film directed by David Christensen

== Music ==
- One Man Woman, a 2009 album by Shèna

=== Songs ===
- "One Man Woman" (The Judds song), 1989
- "One Man Woman" (Milira song), 1992
- "One Man Woman" (Sheena Easton song), 1980
- "One Man Woman", by The Temptations from Surface Thrills, 1983
- "One Man Woman", by Carly Simon from Boys in the Trees, 1978
- "One Man Woman", by Mya from Smoove Jones 2016
- "One Man Woman", by Playa featuring Aaliyah; see List of songs recorded by Aaliyah
- "One Man Woman", by Wayne Fontana, 1973
- "One Man Woman/One Woman Man", by Paul Anka and Odia Coates, 1975
