= (At Your Best) You Are Love =

1976 song by the Isley Brothers

Song by the Isley Brothers

from the album Harvest for the World
- Released: May 29, 1976
- Recorded: 1975
- Studio: Record Plant (Los Angeles, California)
- Genre: R&B, quiet storm
- Length: 5:23
- Songwriters: Ernie Isley; Marvin Isley; Chris Jasper; Rudolph Isley; O'Kelly Isley; Ronald Isley; Chris Jasper

Audio video
- "(At Your Best) You Are Love" on YouTube

"(At Your Best) You Are Love" is a song by R&B group the Isley Brothers. It was originally released on their album Harvest for the World. The song was dedicated to their mother, Sally. Although not a single, the song was a radio hit in 1976, and later became a hit for R&B singer Aaliyah in 1994.

== Background ==
"(At Your Best) You Are Love" was written by Ernie Isley and it was originally "dedicated to the Isley Brothers' mother, Sally". It was featured on the groups fourteenth studio album "Harvest for the World" (1976). According to Isley: "The first time I played it after I had initially written the song was for my brother Rudolph, just voice and guitar. When he heard me say, "You're a positive motivating force within my life," he got this quizzical smile on his face, like how? The syllables and the notes — he goes, say that again? Then he sort of nodded his head like, yeah, that's pretty good. And that's one of the things that I think captures the emotion in the song". While discussing the song's message he stated, "That song was expressing the way I felt towards someone. And sometimes you can feel a certain way towards someone and they don't always get it. So it was both like an affirmation and kind of a frustration too because it does say, "You may not be in the mood to learn what you think you know".

== Personnel ==
- Ronald Isley: lead vocals, background vocals
- O'Kelly Isley, Jr.: background vocals
- Rudolph Isley: background vocals
- Ernie Isley: electric guitar, acoustic guitars, drums, background vocals
- Marvin Isley: bass played by, background vocals
- Chris Jasper: acoustic piano, electric piano, keyboards, synthesizers, background vocals
- Produced, written, composed and arranged by The Isley Brothers and Chris Jasper

== Aaliyah version ==
"At Your Best (You Are Love)"

Single by Aaliyah

from the album Age Ain't Nothing but a Number
- B-side: "Back & Forth"
- Released: August 22, 1994
- Recorded: 1993
- Studio: Chicago Recording Company (Chicago)
- Genre: Soul (album version); G-funk (remix)
- Length: 4:52 (album version); 4:30 (remix)
- Label: Blackground; Jive
- Songwriters: O'Kelly Isley; Rudolph Isley; Marvin Isley; Ronald Isley; Chris Jasper; Ernie Isley
- Producer: R. Kelly

Aaliyah singles chronology
"Back & Forth" (1994)	"At Your Best (You Are Love)" (1994)	"Age Ain't Nothing but a Number" (1994)

Music video
- "At Your Best (You Are Love)" on YouTube

Aaliyah covered the song for her debut studio album, Age Ain't Nothing but a Number (1994). Her version, titled "At Your Best (You Are Love)," was produced by R. Kelly. It released as the second single from Age Ain't Nothing but a Number on August 22, 1994, by Blackground Records and Jive Records. A commercial success, it peaked at number six on the US Billboard Hot 100 and number two on the Hot R&B/Hip-Hop Songs. Soon after its release, it was certified gold by the Recording Industry Association of America (RIAA).

=== Background ===
At one point The Isley Brothers catalog saw an increase in popularity among the Hip Hop community. According to Ernie Isley, "The hip-hop-MTV-rap guys, as they came to the forefront, were leaning on different songs from our catalog. They embraced us and we embraced them back. We had to give [Aaliyah's cover] a green light". Aaliyah was a fan of the group and after meeting lead singer Ronald Isley she expressed to him how much she loved the song; eventually, he gave her the green light to record the record.

Former Jive records A&R Jeff Sledge credits R. Kelly for Aaliyah covering the song. In an Interview Sledge said: "If I'm not mistaken, I don't think the Isley Brothers version was ever a single. It was like an album cut. A lot of people didn't really know that because it wasn't a big album single. It wasn't even one of their more popular album cuts. They have a lot of album cuts that are very popular too and it wasn't even that. It was this hidden gem. I think it was a Chicago thing. Knowing Robert, it was probably a big record in Chicago and he just liked the record and he just decided to do it over".

=== Music and lyrics ===
Musically, the album version of "At Your Best (You Are Love)" is a "vintage Soul ballad". In a review of Age Age Ain't Nothing but a Number, Billboard described the song as a "sweet ballad". The songs arrangement is very close to the original version performed by the Isley Brothers. Aaliyah begins the record showcasing her "flute-like head voice" by singing the lyrics "Let me know ... let me know", in an a cappella. Ann Powers from NPR noted that "As the arrangement unfolds, satin, around her, she takes in each phrase and makes the listener consider it, moving slowly and deliberately, as if she's explaining something". Powers concluded that the vocals on the song are not sexy but reassuring.

According to Rolling Stone writer Mosi Reeves, "she sings with grace, before offering a wordless cry with incandescent softness". Tonya Pendleton from The Washington Post noted that though her voice is soft, "her diction is clear, and each word resonates with feeling" on the song. The "Gangstar Child Remix", which was released as the single has a "bass-heavy G-funk beat", and it features various murmured interjections from Kelly. For the remix, Aaliyah sings with newly alternate vocals, "that's more restrained than the version on her debut, Age Ain't Nothin' But a Number".

=== Critical reception ===
"At Your Best (You Are Love)" received widespread critical acclaim. Oliver VanDervoort from AXS praised Aaliyah, saying "The singer nailed her version of the song." Reviewing the single for Billboard, Larry Flick described the song as a "seductive urban ballad". Adding that "Aaliyah continues to exhibit a warm and soulful style that belies her teen-age years." He noted that R. Kelly "does an excellent job of blending a raw street groove with a lush R&B melody and layers of sweet vocals. Gorgeous." Damien Scott from Complex felt that the song was a nice departure from the hip hop and new jack swing–inspired songs that comprised a large portion of Age Ain't Nothing but a Number. He said that the song showed Aaliyah was "on the cusp of adulthood". John Martinucci from the Gavin Report said, "Aaliyah's second single from her gold debut album, Age Ain't Nothing But A Number isn't the one everybody was anticipating. Aaliyah respectfully remakes The Isley Brothers classic with soothing vocals".

In his weekly UK chart commentary, James Masterton wrote, "Her second hit is in essence a beauty, a sparse but haunting rendition of an old Isley Brothers track, first written and recorded before she was even born." While reviewing the song, Ralph Tee from Music Week gave the song a 4 out 5 rating and praised it for "combining the essence of the original song with new ideas in the arrangement and a drum kick which opens it up to the dancefloor". He also felt that "it's a tune that'll be making a big impression soon." Tee's colleague Alan Jones gave it three out of five, adding that "this pretty Isley Brothers ballad is played on traditional instruments, and is sung by the striking young R Kelly protege in intimate and breathily pure style."

MTV.com felt that "(At Your Best) You Are Love" was one of the album's highlights, along with "Young Nation," "Age Ain't Nothing But A Number" and "Down With The Clique." In a retrospective review, Cydney Lee from Billboard praised Aaliyah's vocal delivery on the song and felt that she maintained the original song's "depth with a sense of maturity and grace that defined her emerging class of young R&B stars, like Brandy and Monica, at the time." In a Rolling Stone interview discussing Aaliyah and the songs legacy, Ernie Isley praised her cover. Isley stated, "When I first heard it, I liked it. I had no idea that it would be such a big hit for her, much less a signature hit for her. And then she did two versions of the song. There was one that had a little bit more hip-hop feel in the music, then there was the first one that was similar to the Isley Brother version, but either way, she made the song hers".

=== Commercial performance ===
"At Your Best (You Are Love)" entered the Billboard Hot 100 at number 69 during the week of September 3, 1994. Seven weeks later, on October 15, the song peaked at number 6; it has spent 20 consecutive weeks on the Hot 100. Meanwhile, on the Hot R&B/Hip-Hop Songs chart, it debuted at number 10; 4 weeks later, it peaked at number 2. It also peaked at number 2 on the Rhythmic chart. The song received a Gold certification by the RIAA on October 25, 1994.

Internationally, the song reached the top 40 in several countries, including The Netherlands, where it peaked at number 40 on November 11. On the UK singles chart, it peaked at number 27. On the UK Dance chart, it peaked at number 11. It also peaked at number 4 on the UK Hip Hop/R&B chart. In New Zealand, the song peaked at number 38 on December 4.

=== Music video ===
The accompanying music video for "At Your Best (You Are Love)" was directed by Millicent Shelton. In her biography Baby Girl: Better Known as Aaliyah (2021) author Kathy Iandoli said the video "shows Aaliyah singing into an old-school Kellogg telephone in a booth, while R. Kelly waits for her in the car." In another scene, "the two then start step dancing with each other against a brick overlay before pivoting to the obligatory hip-hop music video parking lot scene". According to Iandoli, her earlier videos including "(At Your Best) You Are Love You Are Love", all have in common the usage of an "vignette effect, where Aaliyah is almost haloed, as the color schemes change from warm earth tone tints to black and white". The video made its television debut on BET during the week of August 14, 1994 and August 27 on The Box. During the week of August 21, 1994 the video made its debut on MTV. The video received ample airplay and became the 8th most played video on BET, while becoming the 18th most played on MTV for the week ending on September 25. It was published on YouTube in October 2009. As of May 2024, the video has amassed over 22 million views.

=== Track listings and formats ===
- US 12-inch vinyl
1. "At Your Best (You Are Love)" (Gangstar Child Remix) – 4:30
2. "At Your Best (You Are Love)" (Stepper's Ball Remix) – 3:05
3. "At Your Best (You Are Love)" (album version) – 4:43
4. "At Your Best (You Are Love)" (Gangstar Child Remix) (instrumental) – 4:30
- US cassette single
1. "At Your Best (You Are Love)" (album version) – 4:43
2. "At Your Best (You Are Love)" (Gangstar Child Remix) – 4:30
3. "At Your Best (You Are Love)" (Stepper's Ball Remix) – 3:05
- US maxi CD single
1. "At Your Best (You Are Love)" (album version) – 4:43
2. "At Your Best (You Are Love)" (Gangstar Child Remix) – 4:30
3. "At Your Best (You Are Love)" (Stepper's Ball Remix) – 3:05
4. "Back & Forth" (Ms. Mello Radio Mix) – 3:50
- UK 12-inch vinyl
1. "At Your Best (You Are Love)" (Gangstar Child Remix) – 4:30
2. "At Your Best (You Are Love)" (Stepper's Ball Remix) – 3:05
3. "At Your Best (You Are Love)" (album version) – 4:43
4. "At Your Best (You Are Love)" (UK Flavour Stepper's Mix) – 4:55
5. "At Your Best (You Are Love)" (UK Flavour) – 4:57
- UK cassette and Japanese mini CD singles
1. "At Your Best (You Are Love)" (album version) – 4:43
2. "At Your Best (You Are Love)" (Gangstar Child Remix) – 4:30
- UK maxi CD single
1. "At Your Best (You Are Love)" (no intro) – 4:12
2. "At Your Best (You Are Love)" (Gangstar Child Remix) – 4:30
3. "At Your Best (You Are Love)" (Stepper's Ball Remix) – 3:05
4. "At Your Best (You Are Love)" (UK Flavour) – 4:57
5. "At Your Best (You Are Love)" (UK Flavour Stepper's Mix) – 4:55
6. "At Your Best (You Are Love)" (album version) – 4:43

=== Credits and personnel ===
Credits are adapted from the liner notes of Age Ain't Nothing but a Number.

- Aaliyah – lead vocals, backing vocals
- R. Kelly – multi-instrumentation, production

=== Charts ===
==== Weekly charts ====
Chart (1994)	Peak position
Canada Top Singles (RPM)	76
Europe (European Hot 100 Singles)	87
Netherlands (Dutch Top 40 Tipparade)	10
Netherlands (Single Top 100)	40
New Zealand (Recorded Music NZ)	38
Scottish Singles Sales (Official Charts)	90
UK Singles (Official Charts)	27
UK Dance (Official Charts)	11
UK Hip Hop/R&B (Official Charts)	4
UK Club Chart (Music Week)	69
US Billboard Hot 100	6
US Dance Singles Sales (Billboard)	6
US Hot R&B/Hip-Hop Songs (Billboard)	2
US Pop Airplay (Billboard)	40
US Rhythmic Airplay (Billboard)	2
US Cash Box Top 100	17

==== Year-end charts ====
Chart (1994)	Position
US Billboard Hot 100	70
US Hot R&B/Hip-Hop Songs (Billboard)	23

=== Certifications ===
Region	Certification	Certified units/sales
New Zealand (RMNZ)	Gold	15,000^{‡}
United States (RIAA)	Gold	500,000^{^}
^{^} Shipments figures based on certification alone.^{‡} Sales+streaming figures based on certification alone.

=== Release history ===
Release dates and formats for "At Your Best (You Are Love)"
Region	Date	Format(s)	Label(s)	Ref.
United States	August 22, 1994	12-inch vinyl; cassette; maxi CD	Blackground; Jive	
United Kingdom	October 10, 1994	12-inch vinyl; cassette; maxi CD	Jive	
Japan	October 21, 1994	Mini CD	BMG	
Australia	January 30, 1995	CD; cassette	BMG	

== Other versions ==
- In the Philippines, the Aaliyah version was covered by two artists: MYMP on their album Versions and Nina from her love songs live album Nina Live!.
- Swedish artist El Perro Del Mar covered the song in 2009 as a special Record Store Day release as well.
- In 2015, Frank Ocean released a cover (You are Luhh) on his Tumblr account as a tribute to Aaliyah, one day after what would have been her 36th birthday. A slightly different version was also included on his visual album Endless.
- In 2021, English singer Sinéad Harnett covered the song with a new music video to tribute to Aaliyah's version of the song.

== Samples ==
- DJ Screw sampled the "Gangstar Child Remix" of Aaliyah's version in his song "My Mind Went Blank", released in 1995.
- In 2010, Drake released a song with Young Jeezy called "Unforgettable" which samples Aaliyah's version of the record.
- "Activist" by Gucci Mane & Peewee Longway, released in 2013, samples Aaliyah's version.
- Tamar Braxton sampled Aaliyah's version in her single with Future, "Let Me Know".

== Bibliography ==
- Iandoli, Kathy (2021). Baby Girl: Better Known as Aaliyah. Atria Books. ISBN 978-1982156862.
