= Millicent Shelton =

American film director

- Born: January 29, 1966 (age 60); St. Louis, Missouri, U.S.
- Occupations: Film director, music video director and television director
- Years active: 1989–present
- Website: millicentshelton.com

Millicent B. Shelton (born January 29, 1966) is an American music video, television and film director.

Shelton began her career as a wardrobe production assistant on the Spike Lee film Do the Right Thing (1989). She went on to direct music videos for artists such as Mary J. Blige, R. Kelly, Aaliyah, CeCe Peniston, and Salt-n-Pepa.

Her other directing credits include the motion picture Ride (1998) and episodes of Everybody Hates Chris, The Bernie Mac Show, Girlfriends, The Walking Dead, Castle, Californication, My Name Is Earl, 90210, Men of a Certain Age, Pan Am, Leverage, and 30 Rock, for which she became the first African-American woman to receive a Primetime Emmy Award nomination for Outstanding Directing for a Comedy Series for the episode "Apollo, Apollo".

She is an alumna of Princeton University and New York University’s Tisch School of the Arts.

== Music video credits ==
Salt-N-Pepa - "Expression" (1990)
Kwamé & A New Beginning - "Ownlee Ewe" (1990)
Kwamé & A New Beginning - "Oneovdabigboiz" (1990)
Salt-N-Pepa - "Let's Talk About Sex" (1991)
Wreckx-N-Effect - "Rump Shaker" (1992)
Exposé - "I Wish the Phone Would Ring" (1992)
CeCe Peniston - "Keep On Walkin'" (1992)
Robin S. - "Show Me Love" (1993)
Heavy D. & the Boyz - "Truthful" (1993)
R. Kelly - "Your Body's Callin'" (1994)
Mary J. Blige - "Love No Limit" (co-directed with Sean Combs) (1993)
Mint Condition - "U Send Me Swingin'" (1993)
Aaliyah - "Back & Forth" (1994)
Aaliyah - "At Your Best (You Are Love)" (1994)
Aaliyah - "Age Ain't Nothing but a Number" (1994)
CeCe Peniston - "I'm Not Over You" (1994)
CeCe Peniston - "Hit By Love" (1994)
Pete Rock & C.L. Smooth - "Lots of Lovin'" (1993)
Xscape - "Love on My Mind" (1994)
Patra - "Pull Up to the Bumper" (1995)
Rhian Benson - "Say How I Feel" (2003)
Rhian Benson - "Stealing My Piece of Mind" (2003)
