= Back & Forth (Aaliyah song) =

1994 single by Aaliyah

Single by Aaliyah

from the album Age Ain't Nothing but a Number
- Released: April 8, 1994
- Studio: Chicago Recording Company (Chicago)
- Genre: Dance; pop; R&B; new jack swing
- Length: 3:51
- Label: Blackground; Jive
- Songwriter: R. Kelly
- Producer: R. Kelly

Aaliyah singles chronology
"Back & Forth" (1994)	"At Your Best (You Are Love)" (1994)

Music video
- "Back & Forth" on YouTube

"Back & Forth" is the debut single performed by American singer Aaliyah for her debut studio album, Age Ain't Nothing but a Number (1994). The song was written and produced by R&B singer R. Kelly, and lyrically the song is about a teenager's excitement for partying on the weekend with friends. "Back and Forth" has been described as being a dance/pop/R&B and new jack swing song. Aaliyah sings in a "laid back" style. Blackground and Jive released the song as the album's lead single on April 8, 1994, to generally positive reviews with many critics praising the song's lyrical content and Aaliyah's vocal delivery on the record.

Commercially "Back & Forth" performed well peaking at number five on the US Billboard Hot 100 on the week ending on July 2, 1994. The song was successful on the Hot R&B Singles chart, topping the chart on the week ending on May 21, 1994, and spending a total of three weeks at number one on the chart. The song also topped the Top 40/Rhythm-Crossover chart on the week ending on July 9, 1994. On June 9, 1994, the song was certified gold by the Recording Industry Association of America (RIAA). Towards the end of 1994 Billboard reported that the song had sold over 700,000 copies.

Internationally "Back & Forth" performed moderately well peaking within the top 20 at number 16 on the UK's official chart. Also in the UK the song peaked within the top 20 at number 16 on the Official Dance Chart. Elsewhere in Europe the song peaked within the top 40 at number 38 in the Netherlands. The song's accompanying music video was directed by Millicent Shelton in Aaliyah's hometown of Detroit. The actual video location was at Aaliyah's high school and on the day of the video shoot many local teens were recruited to be in multiple scenes of the video.

== Music and lyrics ==
Musically, "Back & Forth" was described as being dance, pop and R&B. Quinn Peterson from Jet labeled the song as new jack swing-oriented. While, Shaheem Reid from MTV News said it had a G-Funk "synthesizer beat". Reid's MTV colleague Carvell Wallace, noted that its backing track "has the markers of traditional boom-bap, with its terse snare and DJ Premier–inspired half-verse samples, and a West Coast keyboard winding its way through the chorus." On the song, Aaliyah sings with a "subtle, laid-back vocal". Wallace further analyzed her vocals on the record saying: "Aaliyah’s vocal performance, an unusually breathy lilt that is both captivating and sanguine, transforms the earthly beat into something celestial. The melody feels improvisational, like someone catching the spirit, riffing over a groove until choruses and harmonies rise suddenly to the surface, revealing the entire thing as a carefully considered work".

Lyrically she sings about partying with her friends during the weekend. Billboard said, "It doesn't matter that Aaliyah is 15. It's the freakin' weekend, baby, so she's picking up her ladies—presumably in her jeep—and hitting the local party spot". When asked about the lyrical direction of the song, Aaliyah stated: "It's not a song about love or whatever; it's about going to a party and having fun. I have songs about love, crushes, or whatever, but that song is about dancing. This album is about teens and what they go through." Entertainment Weekly interpreted the songs lyrical content as a "steamy invitation to dance all night" with Aaliyah requesting to "let the funky melody put you in the mood". In his assessment of the lyrics, author Tim Footman explained, " 'The lyrics tonight' ...oh, it's all right – could have come straight out of a rhyming dictionary, but Aaliyah's performance is utterly convincing, not to say controversial". Footman also highlighted that "she expresses the emotions of a young girl discovering the first stirrings of erotic desire, in a number some people felt was too hot and steamy for a young girl to perform".

== Release and promotion ==
"Back & Forth" was released in the United States on April 8. and immediately Jive Records "laid a strong foundation" for its arrival. Upon its release, a snippet of the song was included on "the back" of R. Kelly's remix for "Bump n' Grind". After its launch, Jive sent out 500 promotional products that included "a popular children's toy that consists of two oversized marbles tied to the end of a string". In addition, the label sent flyers to 1,500 independent retailers. Aaliyah was also being promoted through an April mass mailing, which sent out 28,000 three-page brochures to one-stops and major chains. In the United Kingdom, the single was released on June 20, 1994. The following month, it was released in Australia and Japan, on July 18 and 21, respectively.

== Critical reception ==
"Back & Forth" received widespread critical acclaim upon its release. AllMusic writer Andy Kellman called the song "delightful". Oliver VanDervoort from AXS praised the record saying, "The song is another piece of upbeat pop that got stuck in your head after hearing it just once." Larry Flick from Billboard magazine felt that it was on the course to being a pop and urban smash and praised Aaliyah's vocal styling: "It is worth noting that this newcomer has the vocal charm and range to warm the hearts of punters on her own". According to Georgette Cline from The Boombox, "Moving away from the R&B that speaks of heartbreak and betrayal, Aaliyah's vocals shined on the lead single from her debut LP, 'Age Ain't Nothing But a Number,' as she sang of hitting the dancefloor and getting lost in the DJ's tunes". Elena Bergeron from Complex felt that the song was the perfect example of why Aaliyah could play coy with the media regarding her age. Bergeron also praised Aaliyah's voice: "Instead of over-emoting like a child singer, Aaliyah's confident in singing about something basic—it's just a song about partying on a Friday night-and that takes an adult's restraint". Bill Speed and John Martinucci from the Gavin Report noted: "Don't sleep on this track, Aaliyah's mid-tempo melodic groove will grab you and won't let go."

Alan Jones from Music Week deemed it "a smooth, summery, soulful jill swing debut", noting "an easy, rolling, almost jazzy style, and a vocal that is not a million miles from Janet Jackson." Ralph Tee from the magazine's RM Dance Update said "this young lady pitches her voice somewhere between Mary J. Blige and the lead singer of SWV on a medium-paced swing tune, the melody being in one of those sultry minor keys so typical of contemporary urban R&B". James Hamilton called it a "seductively cooing girl's R. Kelly created superb slinky bump n' (groin) grinder". Quentin B. Huff from PopMatters felt that the song was "Simple, but effective, and Aaliyah's layered vocals warm the track like a soothing blanket. "Back & Forth" integrates seamlessly into any up-tempo dance playlist". RPM labeled the song as a "wicked track" that allowed Aaliyah,"to stretch herself within the groove." James Hunter from Vibe felt the song was a "leading candidate for the years best single" and that Aaliyah had "one of those "Who's that?" voices". In a review for Age Ain't Nothing but a Number, Tonya Pendleton from The Washington Post praised Aaliyah's vocals on the song by saying: "Aaliyah's silken voice caresses the beat, which swings rhythmically through "Back and Forth," one of this summer's street anthems".

== Commercial performance ==
"Back & Forth" debuted at number 56 on the US Billboard Hot 100 during the week of April 30, 1994. By May 14, the song had sold 31,000 units according to Nielsen SoundScan. The song reached its peak at number five almost three months after it was released, on July 2. On the Hot R&B Singles chart, it debuted at number 13, and peaked at number one on May 21. During its chart run, "Back & Forth" ended R. Kelly's 12-week run atop the Hot R&B Singles chart with "Bump n' Grind". Additionally, "Back & Forth" peaked atop the Top 40/Rhythm-Crossover chart on July 9. Meanwhile, it peaked at number 16 on the Mainstream Top 40 on July 30. On June 9, it was certified gold by the Recording Industry Association of America (RIAA). By the end of 1994, the single had sold over 700,000 copies in the United States, being the 13th best-selling single of the year. Outside Billboard charts, the song reached number four on Los Angeles Times Southern California pop singles chart on June 26, 1994.

Internationally, "Back & Forth" experienced moderate success. In the United Kingdom, the single reached number 16 on the UK Singles Chart and stayed in the top 100 for five weeks. On July 10, the song peaked at number 16 on the UK Dance Singles Chart. According to the Official Charts Company (OCC), "Back & Forth" is Aaliyah's fifth best-selling song in the UK. In the Netherlands, the song peaked at number 38 on the Dutch Single Top 100. In New Zealand, it peaked at number 48.

== Music video ==
=== Background and synopsis ===
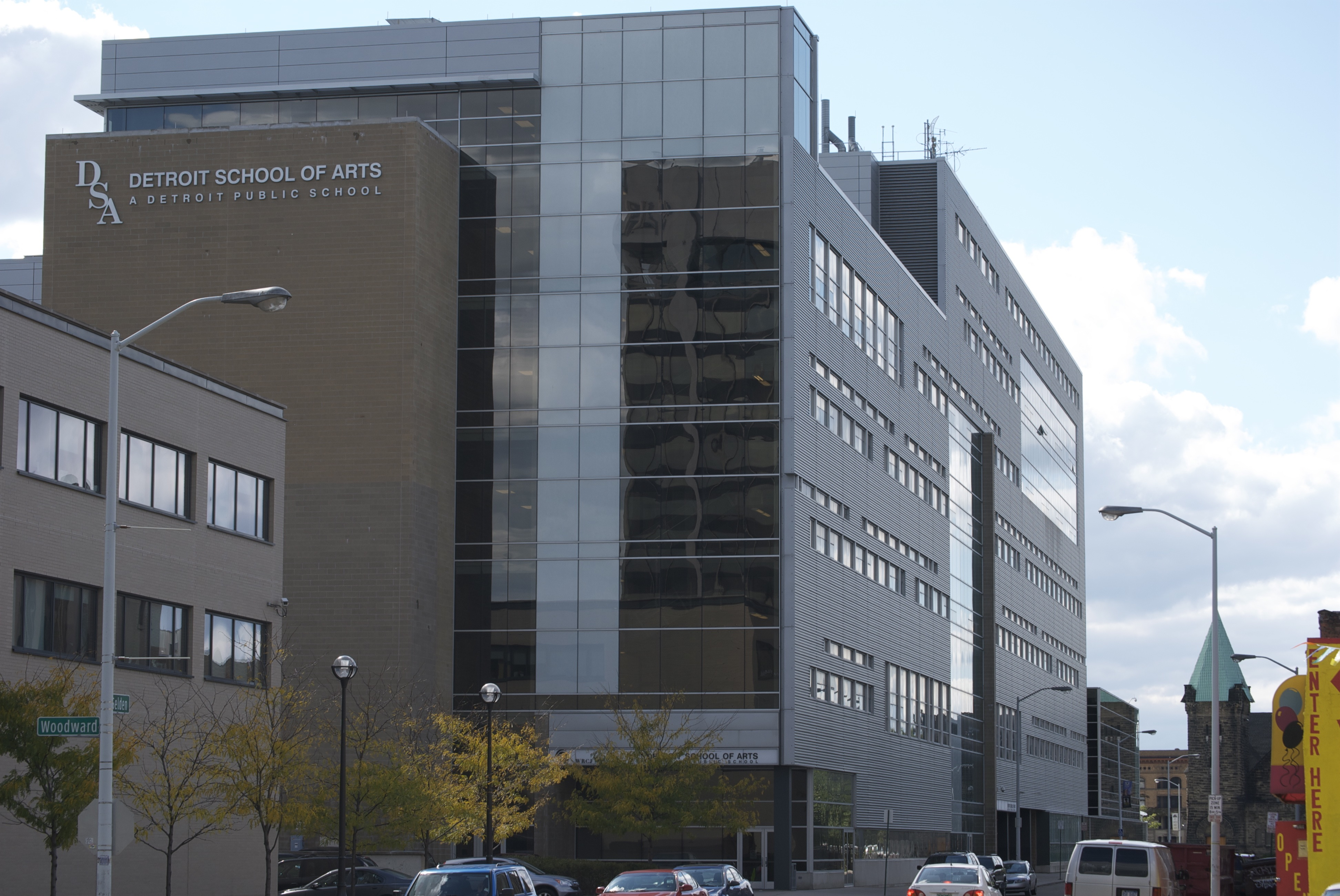
"Back and Forth" was filmed at Aaliyah's alma mater Detroit High School for the Fine and Performing Arts.

The music video for "Back & Forth" was directed by American director Millicent Shelton and it was filmed on January 16, 1994, which was Aaliyah's 15th birthday. Styling for the video was orchestrated by April Walker, Kimya Warfield-Rainge and Nicole "Cola" Walker of Walker Wear. Prior to video they were hired as image consultants for Aaliyah and given an unofficial copy of the album "to be able to hear where she was going with her music". From there they began building on the direction that they thought her image should go in. R.Kelly and Aaliyah also brainstormed on ideas together in regards to choreography and styling. According to Warfield-Rainge during her first meeting with Aaliyah, her team had an image already set for her. Warfield-Rainge also recalled that in the meeting they were told to purchase various items such as an Air Jordan sweatsuit and dark sunglasses. For the video, Aaliyah wore a vest that had the license plate for the state of Illinois engraved on the back side; it also included "LIYAH1" sprayed across it. She would then wear that same vest on her album cover for "Age Ain't Nothing but a Number".

The video was filmed partially in both Detroit and Los Angeles. In Detroit scenes were filmed at Detroit's High School for the Fine and Performing Arts, which was the school that Aaliyah attended at the time. On the day of the video shoot in Detroit many local teens were recruited to be part of the video. In Los Angeles scenes were filmed at a local gymnasium, but in the midst of filming, the Northridge earthquake hit which forced production to be halted, "once the coast was clear" filming resumed. When Aaliyah discussed her experience of shooting her first music video she said, "That was my first video, but Millicent made me comfortable Between takes, she listened to the music of Tupac, Wu-Tang, and Gang Starr, They all rap on an intellectual level”.

The video opens with a male entering a (school) gym, bouncing a basketball. When the song kicks in, there are cuts of people entering the gym and people playing basketball. Aaliyah enters wearing baggy clothing, a bandana and shades. She sings the song by the gym's entrance. In other parts of the clip she is seen dancing in the middle of the gymnasium with a crowd moving around her, sitting with R. Kelly in the bleachers and performing on a stage to her fans.

=== Release and reception ===
The instant success for Back & Forth's accompanying music video prompted Aaliyah's record label to release her debut album earlier than expected. According to Barry Weiss, Senior Vice President of Jive records, "The original June 14 release date of the album "Age Ain't Nothing But A Number" was moved up to May 24. Weiss continued his statement saying,"Back & Forth" has permeated the consciousness of the young public, and because it has picked up steam so quickly, MTV jumped on board faster than we thought, which led to our decision to drop the album sooner".

The video made its official television debut during the week of February 27 on BET and March 5 on The box. During its chart run it received heavy airplay on several networks. For the week ending on June 12, 1994, the music video was the second most played video on BET. Meanwhile, for the week ending on June 26, 1994, the music video was the twelfth most played video on MTV. Steffanee Wang from Nylon felt that the video gives a "glimpse of the cultural monolith she would become". While retrospectively discussing the video, former Jive Records A&R Jeff Sledge said it "was a very fun, energetic video", and that "it represented what 15- or 16-year-old kids were doing at that time or dressing like at that time. It was a perfect depiction of what kids her age around the country were doing". In her biography Baby Girl: Better Known as Aaliyah (2021) author Kathy Iandoli said her earlier videos including "Back & Forth", all have in common the usage of an "vignette effect, where Aaliyah is almost haloed, as the color schemes change from warm earth tone tints to black and white".

== Legacy ==
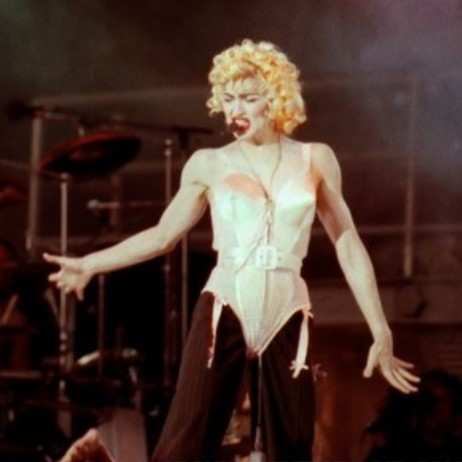
"Back and Forth" was sampled by American singer Madonna.

Madonna sampled "Back & Forth" on her song "Inside of Me" from her sixth studio album Bedtime Stories (1994), which was released a few months after "Back & Forth". In October 1994 the song was nominated for Best New R&B/Urban Artist Clip Of The Year at the Billboard Music Video Awards. Meanwhile, in July 1995 Aaliyah was nominated for Best R&B/Soul New Artist for "Back & Forth" at the Soul Train Lady of Soul Awards. British publication NME ranked the song at number 10 on their 50 "Incredible Debut Singles That Kick-Started Massive Careers" list.

HuffPost ranked the song at number 16 on their "Ranking Of The 33 Greatest Pop Divas’ Debut Singles list", stating "Aaliyah blended hip-hop and dance-pop to foster a sound that many of her peers would ape". Billboard included "Back & Forth" on their Summer Songs 1958-2016: The Top 10 Tunes of Each Summer list. The song was also ranked at number 13 on Idolator's The 50 Best Pop Singles Of 1994 list. Rapper Kid Ink mentioned the song on his verse on Sevyn Streeter's 2014 song nEXt.

In 2014, Beyoncé shared her memorial day playlist via her website and "Back and Forth" was included in the list. In 2015, at Rihanna's Diamond Ball charity event, "Back & Forth" was included in the setlist. In 2017, Kim Kardashian included the song on her Spotify "glam session" playlist. In 2018, Tyga sampled "Back & Forth" on his song "U Cry". In 2019, Chris Brown sampled "Back & Forth" on his song “Throw It Back" from his ninth studio album Indigo. In May 2020 Rolling Stone included the song at number 51 on their "The 100 Greatest Debut Singles of All Time" list. The song is ranked at number 476 on Billboard's Greatest of All Time Songs of the Summer chart.

== Track listings ==
- U.S. cassette single – Jive 01241-42174-4
  U.K. 7-inch single – Jive 357
  U.K. cassette single – Jive C 357
1. "Back & Forth" (LP version) – 3:51
2. "Back & Forth" (Mr. Lee & R. Kelly's Remix) – 3:44
- U.S. 12-inch maxi-single – Jive 01241-42173-1
  U.S. CD maxi-single – Jive 01241-42173-2
1. "Back & Forth" (LP version) – 3:51
2. "Back & Forth" (Mr. Lee & R. Kelly's Remix) – 3:44
3. "Back & Forth" (Ms. Mello Remix) – 5:58
4. "Back & Forth" (Mr. Lee's Club Mix) – 5:40
5. "Back & Forth" (Ms. Mello Instrumental) – 5:58
6. "Back & Forth" (Mr. Lee's Bonus Beats) – 5:13
- U.K. CD maxi-single – Jive CD 357
1. "Back & Forth" (LP version) – 3:51
2. "Back & Forth" (Mr. Lee & R. Kelly's Remix) – 3:44
3. "Back & Forth" (UK Flavour) – 4:37
4. "Back & Forth" (Ms. Mello Remix) – 5:58
5. "Back & Forth" (Mr. Lee's Club Mix) – 5:40
- U.K. 12-inch maxi-single – Jive T 357
1. "Back & Forth" (LP version) – 3:51
2. "Back & Forth" (Mr. Lee & R. Kelly's Remix) – 3:44
3. "Back & Forth" (Ms. Mello Remix) – 5:58
4. "Back & Forth" (UK Flavour) – 4:37
5. "Back & Forth" (Mr. Lee's Club Mix) – 5:40

== Charts ==
=== Weekly charts ===
Weekly chart performance
Chart (1994)	Peak position
Australia (ARIA)	100
Canada Top Singles (RPM)	70
Canada CHR (The Record)	25
Europe (European Hot 100 Singles)	77
Netherlands (Single Top 100)	38
New Zealand (Recorded Music NZ)	48
Scottish Singles Sales (Official Charts)	73
UK Singles (Official Charts)	16
UK Dance (Official Charts)	16
UK Airplay (Music Week)	34
UK Dance (Music Week)	6
UK Club Chart (Music Week)	37
US Billboard Hot 100	5
US Dance Singles Sales (Billboard)	2
US Hot R&B/Hip-Hop Songs (Billboard)	1
US Pop Airplay (Billboard)	16
US Rhythmic Airplay (Billboard)	1
US Cash Box Top 100	6

=== Year-end charts ===
Annual chart rankings
Chart (1994)	Position
US Billboard Hot 100	24
US Hot R&B Singles (Billboard)	2
US Maxi-Singles Sales (Billboard)	14
US Cash Box Top 100	25

== Certifications ==
Certifications and sales for "Back & Forth"
Region	Certification	Certified units/sales
New Zealand (RMNZ)	Gold	15,000^{‡}
United Kingdom (BPI)	Silver	200,000^{‡}
United States (RIAA)	Gold	700,000
^{‡} Sales+streaming figures based on certification alone.

== See also ==
- List of number-one R&B singles of 1994 (U.S.)

== Bibliography ==
- Bronson, Fred (2003). The Billboard Book of Number One Hits. Billboard Books. ISBN 9780823076772.
- Footman, Tim (2021). Aaliyah. Plexus Publishing Limited. ISBN 9780859657136.
- Iandoli, Kathy (2021). Baby Girl: Better Known as Aaliyah. Atria Books. ISBN 978-1982156862.
