= Enough Said (song) =

Single by Aaliyah featuring Drake

Single by Aaliyah featuring Drake
- Released: August 5, 2012
- Recorded: 1999 (reworked 2012)
- Genre: Alternative R&B
- Length: 3:57
- Label: Blackground
- Songwriters: Jazze Pha; Johntá Austin; Aubrey Graham
- Producer: Noah "40" Shebib

Aaliyah singles chronology
"Are You Feelin' Me?" (2005)	"Enough Said" (2012)	"Don't Think They Know" (2013)

Drake singles chronology
"Crew Love" (2012)	"Enough Said" (2012)	"Diced Pineapples" (2012)

Audio video
- "Enough Said" on YouTube

"Enough Said" is a song performed by American recording artist Aaliyah. The song features additional vocals provided by Canadian rapper Drake. Originally recorded prior to the singer's death in a plane crash in 2001, Drake later finished the track with producer Noah "40" Shebib in 2012.

"Enough Said" was released by Blackground Records through their SoundCloud account on August 5, 2012. It was sent to US urban and rhythmic radio stations on August 21. The song charted at number 55 on the Billboard Hot R&B/Hip-Hop Songs.

== Composition ==
"Enough Said" is a hazy R&B song with a sparse electronic backing track. It opens with low-end sounds that reveal hypnotic percussion. The song's lyrics implore a lover to disclose and communicate: "I can tell it's somethin' up with you, tell me do you wanna talk about, talk about ... I hate to see you feel this way". Aaliyah sings the song's "yeah yeah yeah" hook with understated vocals, and Drake occasionally interjects with the line "yo, what's up" before rapping a single verse. Aaliyah's vocals were originally written by Johnta Austin and Jazze Pha and recorded in 1999.

== Critical reception ==
Marc Hogan of Spin called the song "a welcome return from a late great, overseen with obvious ... devotion" from Drake, who "mostly manages to stay out of the way on this one, confidently embodying the character of Aaliyah's repressed boyfriend without stifling the track with too much reverence." Bruna Nessif of E! Online felt that "it's hard not to feel some goosebumps rise at the first sound of Aaliyah's soft voice, but quickly, listeners can find themselves taken by the single and moving their head to the smooth beat". MTV's Nadeska Alexis commented that Shebib's production "complements Aaliyah's vocals nicely on the track." Gerrick D. Kennedy of the Los Angeles Times felt that "Drake still deserves to be applauded for the track", despite his "usual struggling-with-fame-pathos" rap verse and its diverse reception with fans of Aaliyah, writing that "rarely do artists get the chance to revive their inspirations, certainly not as deftly as he's done with the track.

By contrast, Jody Rosen of Rolling Stone panned Drake's rap as a "desecration" and "desultory boasting, pointless 'wass ups,' slapped on like gaudy graffiti tags." He gave the song three-and-a-half out of five stars and asserted that, without his contribution, it would be "an engrossing record, with eerily stark production from Noah '40' Shebib: a great fit, and a worthy tribute, to R&B's most avant-garde diva." Robbie Daw of Idolator criticized his rap as "ill-advised" and "ho-hum", and stated, "this is not the 'tribute' we would have liked to hear."

== Charts ==
Chart (2012)	Peak position
Germany Urban (DBC)	12
Netherlands Urban (MegaCharts)	12
US Hot R&B/Hip-Hop Songs (Billboard)	55

== See also ==
- List of works published posthumously
