= Down with the Clique =

Single by Aaliyah

from the album Age Ain't Nothing but a Number
- Released: May 1, 1995
- Recorded: November 1993
- Studio: Chicago Recording Company (Chicago)
- Genre: R&B; hip hop; reggae fusion
- Length: 3:24
- Label: Blackground; Jive
- Songwriter: R. Kelly
- Producer: R. Kelly

Aaliyah singles chronology
"Age Ain't Nothing but a Number" (1994)	"Down with the Clique" (1995)	"I Need You Tonight" (1995)

Audio video
- "Down with the Clique" on YouTube

"Down with the Clique" is a song recorded by American singer Aaliyah for her debut studio album Age Ain't Nothing but a Number (1994). It was written and produced by R. Kelly. The song was released as the fourth single from Age Ain't Nothing but a Number exclusively in the United Kingdom on May 1, 1995, by Blackground Records and Jive Records.

"Down with the Clique" was met with mixed reviews from music critics, who praised Aaliyah's vocal delivery on the song but dismissed its lyrical content. A moderate commercial success, the song peaked at number 33 on the UK Singles Chart, becoming Aaliyah's fourth consecutive top-40 single in the United Kingdom.

== Recording and production ==
While recording "Down with the Clique", Aaliyah developed an interest in producing, and she watched and helped R. Kelly develop the song. She said: "When we were recording 'Down With the Clique', I watched how Robert [Kelly] laid the drums and everything. He taught me to play the piano a bit, and I'm also trying to learn the mixing board, though it looks complicated. The studio is my first love."

== Music and lyrics ==
"Down with the Clique" is a hip hop song in which Aaliyah displays a "silky cooing" with her vocals. In his biography Aaliyah (2021) author Tim Footman said the song was "macho hip-hop posturing over a cheesy, pseudo–Caribbean rhythm track". In February 1995, British producers Mafia & Fluxy produced a reggae remix of the song. Lyrically, the song sees her committing to a "junior-gangsta persona" with lines such as "Well now I guess it's time for me to wreck shop". Footman analyzed the lyrics explaining that, "Kelly's egomania really goes to town here, as Aaliyah entreats, 'all the dolls in the house' to recognize how cool her mentor/songwriter/producer truly is". YardBarker said the lyrics were about "finding out which friends are true blue", and that Aaliyah was "adamant about finding out who's really down to support her".

== Critical reception ==
Kenneth Partridge from Billboard gave "Down with the Clique" a mixed review, saying Aaliyah sounded unnatural singing lines such as "I guess it's time for me to wreck shop" and that the song was too much like an R. Kelly song, but described Aaliyah's performance as "adorable". James Masterton wrote in his weekly UK chart commentary,"Why do Americans pronounce it to rhyme with 'stick'? Its 'cleek' as everyone here knows it which perhaps unfairly makes for rather grating listening as Aaliyah croons her way through her fourth UK hit." Bianca Gracie from Fuse felt that Aaliyah was embodying an "effortless swagger that guys twice her age could only dream of having", also praising Aaliyah's "mellow" and "deep" vocal performance. Nakita Rathod from HotNewHipHop mentioned that despite the controversy surrounding Aaliyah's debut album, she was still able to be a young, free teenager with songs like "Down with the Clique". MTV.com felt that "Down With The Clique" was one of the album's highlights, along with "At Your Best (You Are Love)," "Young Nation," and "Age Ain't Nothing But A Number". The New Sunday Times said the song was a "shout out from Aaliyah to her friends at the mall hangouts." In a review for Age Ain't Nothing but a Number, Tonya Pendleton from The Washington Post praised the production of the song by saying: "Kelly's hip-hop inserts provide a funky contrast that carries over to "Throw Your Hands Up" and "Down With the Clique", all paeans to the fun-loving good times of adolescence".

== Commercial performance ==
"Down with the Clique" was released as the fourth UK single from Age Ain't Nothing but a Number. It peaked at number 33 on the UK Singles Chart dated May 13, 1995. The song also peaked at number five on the UK R&B Singles Chart, and at number 25 on the UK Dance Singles Chart, both on May 7.

== Track listings and formats ==
UK 12-inch vinyl

1. "Down with the Clique" (Madhouse Mix Radio Edit I) – 3:10
2. "Down with the Clique" (Madhouse Mix) (instrumental) – 3:13
3. "Down with the Clique" (Dancehall Mix) – 3:30
4. "Down with the Clique" (Madhouse Mix Radio Edit II) – 3:28

UK maxi CD single

1. "Down with the Clique" (Madhouse Mix Radio Edit I) (no chat) – 3:01
2. "Down with the Clique" (album version) – 3:24
3. "Down with the Clique" (Dancehall Mix) – 3:30
4. "Down with the Clique" (Madhouse Mix Radio Edit II) – 3:28
5. "Down with the Clique" (Madhouse Mix) (instrumental) – 3:13

== Charts ==
Weekly chart performance for "Down with the Clique"
Chart (1995)	Peak position
UK Singles (OCC)	33
UK Dance (OCC)	25
UK Hip Hop/R&B (OCC)	5
UK Club (Music Week)	66

== Release history ==
Release dates and formats for "Down with the Clique"
Region	Date	Format(s)	Label(s)	Ref.
United Kingdom	May 1, 1995	12-inch vinyl; cassette; maxi CD	Jive	
Australia	July 10, 1995	Cassette; CD	Jive	

== Bibliography ==
- Footman, Tim (2021). Aaliyah. Plexus Publishing Limited. ISBN 9780859657136.
