= Kathy Iandoli =

American author and journalist (born 1979)

- Born: February 24, 1979 (age 47); New Jersey, United States
- Education: New York University
- Occupations: Author, journalist
- Website: www.kathyiandoli.com

Kathy Iandoli (born February 24, 1979) is an American author and journalist. She has written for Vibe, The Source, XXL, The Village Voice, Rolling Stone, Billboard, Pitchfork, Playboy, Cosmopolitan, Maxim, The Guardian, Vice, and many other publications. She has held editorial positions at top Hip Hop/urban entertainment websites which include AllHipHop.com, HipHopDX.com and BET.com. Iandoli is a professor of Music Business at New York University and has appeared across the media, on radio and in television and panels discussing Hip Hop and gender.

== Education ==
Iandoli is a graduate of New York University, earning her M.A. in Music Business from the Steinhardt School of Culture, Education, and Human Development.

== Literary career ==
In 2016, Iandoli co-wrote Commissary Kitchen: My Infamous Prison Cookbook with Hip Hop artist Prodigy. It featured a foreword by chef and food personality Eddie Huang and was published by Infamous Books.

God Save The Queens: The Essential History of Women in Hip-Hop was published in 2019 by Dey Street Books. God Save the Queens pays tribute to the women of Hip Hop from the early work of Roxanne Shante, to hitmakers like Queen Latifah and Missy Elliott, to the superstars of today like Megan Thee Stallion, while exploring issues of gender, money, sexuality, violence, body image, feuds, and objectification. NPR listed God Save The Queens as one of their Favorite Books of 2019.

On August 17, 2021, Atria Books (an imprint of Simon & Schuster) published Iandoli's Baby Girl: Better Known as Aaliyah, a biography that draws on interviews with singer and actress Aaliyah's friends, mentors and family, and it documents how her career influenced a new generation of artists. It has not been authorized by the Haughton family. She is the co-author of Eve's memoir Who's That Girl?

== Personal life ==
Iandoli lives in Northern New Jersey and is of Italian descent. She is the daughter of Anna Acquaviva Iandoli, a professor who taught at Montclair State University and William Paterson University. In honor of her mother's passing in 2019, Iandoli organized a scholarship through e-tech company Yellowbrick called Annie's Daughters, which provides young women an opportunity to take part in Yellowbrick's Music Industry Essentials Program in conjunction with New York University. Iandoli also had a school named in her mother's honor in their hometown of Paterson, New Jersey called The Anna Iandoli Early Learning Center. Anna Iandoli taught in Paterson for over 30 years and developed curricula around the world, as well as was an advocate for the importance of early childhood literacy.

Iandoli describes herself as a "roamin' Catholic."

== Works ==
=== Books ===
- Commissary Kitchen: My Infamous Prison Cookbook (with Albert "Prodigy" Johnson). Infamous Books. 2016. ISBN 978-0997146233.
- God Save the Queens: The Essential History of Women in Hip-Hop. Dey Street Books. 2019. ISBN 978-0-062-87850-2.
- Baby Girl: Better Known as Aaliyah. Atria Books. 2021. ISBN 978-1-982-15684-8.
- Can I Mix You A Drink? (with T-Pain). Kingston Imperial. 2021. ISBN 978-1954220003.
- Who's That Girl? (with Eve). Hanover Square Press. 2024. ISBN 978-1335081155.
- Episodes: The Diary of a Recovering Mad Man (with Gucci Mane). Simon & Schuster. 2025. ISBN 978-1-6680-5023-1.
