= Age Ain't Nothing but a Number =

Studio album by Aaliyah
- Released: May 24, 1994
- Recorded: January 1993 – 1994
- Studio: Chicago Recording Company (Chicago)
- Genres: R&B; new jack swing; pop
- Length: 48:54
- Labels: Blackground; Jive
- Producer: R. Kelly

Aaliyah chronology
| Age Ain't Nothing but a Number (1994) | One in a Million (1996) |

Singles from Age Ain't Nothing but a Number
- 1. "Back & Forth" Released: April 8, 1994; 2. "At Your Best (You Are Love)" Released: August 22, 1994; 3. "Age Ain't Nothing but a Number" Released: December 6, 1994; 4. "Down with the Clique" Released: May 2, 1995; 5. "The Thing I Like" Released: August 3, 1995

Age Ain't Nothing but a Number is the debut studio album by American singer Aaliyah. It was released on May 24, 1994, by Blackground Records and Jive Records. After being signed by her uncle Barry Hankerson, Aaliyah was introduced to recording artist and producer R. Kelly, who became her mentor, as well as the lead songwriter and producer of the album. The duo recorded the album at the Chicago Recording Company in Chicago periodically from January 1993 until early 1994.

Age Ain't Nothing but a Number received generally favorable reviews from critics. Many noted Aaliyah's vocal ability and praised the lyrical content. Aaliyah was credited for redefining R&B by blending her voice with Kelly's new jack swing. The album peaked at number 18 on the US Billboard 200 and has been certified double platinum by the Recording Industry Association of America (RIAA).The album has sold over three million copies in the United States and six million copies worldwide.

The album produced two US Billboard Hot 100 top-ten singles—"Back & Forth" and a cover of the 1976 Isley Brothers hit "(At Your Best) You Are Love"; both singles were certified gold by the RIAA. The title track was released as the third and final US single, while "Down with the Clique" and "The Thing I Like" were released as the fourth and fifth singles, respectively, in the United Kingdom.

Before Barry Hankerson signed a distribution deal between Blackground Records and Empire Distribution in August 2021, this work was the only studio album of Aaliyah’s available for legal digital streaming. The rights to the album are owned by Sony Music, a legal successor of Zomba Group of Companies (the original owner of Jive Records).

== Background ==
Aaliyah's uncle Barry Hankerson, who was an entertainment lawyer, had been married to Gladys Knight. As a child, Aaliyah traveled with Knight and worked with an agent in New York, where she auditioned for commercials and television programs, including the sitcom Family Matters. In 1989 at the age of 10, she went on to appear on Star Search, where she performed "My Funny Valentine". Aaliyah chose to begin auditioning while her mother made the decision to have her surname dropped. By the age of 11, she started appearing in concerts alongside Gladys Knight. For five nights, Aaliyah performed with Knight in Las Vegas; during the concerts, she would perform a number in the middle of Knight's set and help close out the show by singing a duet with her. While speaking about her time performing with Knight, Aaliyah said "it was a great learning experience". She also recalled: "I learned a lot about being on stage and how audiences react differently to various songs". According to her: "I would stand in the middle of the stage, sing, and just walk off, Gladys said to me, 'You can't do that, you have to work the audience, make them feel what you feel'."

At age 12, Hankerson took Aaliyah to Vanguard Studios in her hometown of Detroit to record demos with record producer and Vanguard Studios' owner Michael J. Powell. During that time Hankerson was trying to get her a deal with MCA. While working with Powell, Aaliyah recorded several covers, such as "The Greatest Love of All", "Over the Rainbow", and "My Funny Valentine", which she had performed on Star Search. Aside from MCA Records, Hankerson also attempted to get her signed with Warner Bros.; according to Hankerson, although the executives at both labels liked her voice, they ultimately did not sign her. After failed attempts with getting Aaliyah signed to Warner and MCA, Hankerson then shifted his focus on getting her signed to Jive Records, the label that R. Kelly, an artist he managed was signed to. Former Jive Records A&R Jeff Sledge stated that the labels former owner Clive Calder didn't want to sign Aaliyah initially, because he felt that she at age 12 was too young. Sledge stated in an interview: "The guy who owned Jive at the time, Clive Calder, he's also an A&R person by trade. He was basically head of the A&R department. Barry kept shopping her to him and he saw something, but he said, ‘She’s not ready, she’s still young, she needs to be developed more.’ Barry would go back and develop her more". After years of developing Aaliyah more as an artist, Hankerson finally signed a joint distribution deal with Jive, and he signed her to his own label Blackground Records. Once Aaliyah finally got the opportunity to audition for the record executives at Jive, she sang "Vision of Love" by Mariah Carey for them.

== Recording and production ==
By 1993, Aaliyah was signed to both Blackground and Jive. In between that time period Hankerson introduced her to recording artist and producer R. Kelly. When the pair first met, she sang an a cappella song for him; impressed by her voice Kelly then made the decision to work with her. Kelly became her mentor, as well as the sole songwriter and producer for her debut album. Kelly was the only writer and producer credited on the album because JIVE didn't want multiple people sharing publishing rights. According to Jeff Sledge, "Clive was a publishing guru, so he and Barry weren’t trying to cut a lot of people in on the album to share the publishing. They said we’re going to do this with one guy and the publishing will be easy to deal with because it’s one person". Aaliyah and Kelly began recording the album periodically starting in January 1993, when she was 14. Production for the album stopped for a brief period due to her educational obligations, but had resumed during the summer while she was off from school for summer vacation.

Kelly and Aaliyah worked mostly on the record in Chicago, she would fly to Chicago from Detroit, and they would work on the album. In total it took about eight to nine months to complete the album says, Aaliyah. While recording the album, the pair spent a lot of time together by going to arcades and bowling. This helped with the writing process because Kelly would "write the songs that fit her and what kids her age and her friends were talking about". According to Aaliyah, "He just spent time with me, trying to see how I thought about things and what people my age think". When discussing the writing process for the album, Aaliyah said: "We vibed off of one another, and that’s how the songs was built. He would vibe with me on what the lyrics should be. He’d tell me what to sing, and I’d sing it. That’s how the whole album was done". "Old School" was the first song recorded for the album and recording took place at the Chicago Recording Company (CRC) for a duration of at least two days. Aaliyah loved recording "Old School" because that song "had an Isley Brothers flair” to it. Explaining the recording process for "Old School", Aaliyah said: "At first, I had to get comfortable, but I had been around Robert [Kelly], so it was cool. Both Robert and I are perfectionists, and if you listen to the music, there is a lot of passion in it."

During the recording sessions, Kelly would coach her as they worked together for several hours in the studio. She often sang the songs over multiple times in order to achieve "excellence". Hours were hectic in the studio and according to Aaliyah: "We put in a lot of hours; as far as the music, we’d be in there all night making sure it was perfect. There were times when I was tired, but I knew I had to push on if I wanted to come off." Kelly claimed that Aaliyah was "one of the best young artists" he had worked with. During the recording stages, record executives at Jive were out of the loop in regards to the type of material being recorded. The executives at the label didn't hear the album until it was finished, and they were satisfied with the finished product. Sledge said: "When we finally heard the album we were blown away because the album was dope. It was basically like listening to an R. Kelly album, but with a little girl singing".

== Music and lyrics ==
In critical commentaries, Age Ain't Nothing but a Number is classified as an R&B, new jack swing and pop record. According to the book Musichound R&B: The Essential Album Guide (1998), the album "blends the hip-hop sassiness of Mary J. Blige and the soul of Motown". Dean Van Nguyen from The Independent said the record consist of "sunny pop jams and sweet ballads". Vocally, Aaliyah sang the songs in a falsetto and felt the material "came at you kind of tough, a bit edgy, hip-hop, but the vocals can be very soothing". The album opens with the a cappella public service announcement intro that urges its listeners to carefully listen to the instructions given. The next track, "Throw Your Hands Up", is an anthemic up-tempo G-funk-inspired song, and it's described as a "statement of purpose" for Aaliyah. The third track and the album's lead single "Back & Forth" is a dance, Pop, R&B and new jack swing song in which Aaliyah sings with a "subtle, laid-back vocal", as she talks about partying on the weekend with her friends . The title track is as a "soulful ballad" that contains an interpolation from the song "What You Won't Do for Love" performed by Bobby Caldwell. Lyrically it discusses "a young girl pining for the love of an older man, and her telling society that it doesn’t matter the age difference between the two of them".

The fifth track "Down with the Clique" is a hip hop song, while the sixth track "At Your Best (You Are Love)" is a cover that was originally recorded by The Isley Brothers. Aaliyah's cover was labeled as a "sweet" "vintage soul ballad", that gave her a chance to "ditch the tough-girl posturing". The seventh track "No One Knows How to Love Me Quite Like You Do" is a "sensually" up-tempo "crush" record that features a guest rap appearance from Tia Hawkins. Lyrically, it is about Aaliyah being satisfied and how she is "made to feel like a goddess". Hawkins, brings a "comic relief" with her raps, telling the listeners R. Kelly is "spitting tracks as if it were tobacco." When discussing the record itself, Aaliyah stated: "Every girl looks for that one person who is going to love them right. That song is saying, when it comes down to it, I like how you satisfy me." The eighth track "I'm So into You" features another guest rap from Hawkins. The ninth track "Street Thing" is a "pretty standard slow jam" and it is about having devotion for another person. During the bridge of the song, Aaliyah sings about climbing the "highest mountain," and swimming the "deepest sea" to prove her devotion. The tenth track "Young Nation" is about Aaliyah "aligning herself with an entire movement". The eleventh track "Old School" is about merging an old school style with a new school style, the opening begins with "Here's the old school / With the new school". The albums final track "I'm Down" is a mid-tempo rap-soul ballad that focuses on "one person giving themselves fully to another".

== Release and promotion ==
Aaliyah's record label didn't interfere with her image so she was granted free rein when it came to her imaging and style. Former Jive Records A&R Jeff Sledge mentioned in an interview that the promotional campaign was set up so that Aaliyah wouldn't have to change her image or style. When asked about the promotional plans for the album, Jive's senior vice president Barry Weiss said "there [would] be little in the way of marketing changes between the domestic and world promotion of the set". Speaking about Aaliyah's image, he said: "She is what she is the album has tremendous pop appeal to go along with her urban edge, so there's not a whole lot different that we'll be doing abroad". A month before the release of the album's lead single "Back & Forth", Aaliyah attended the Urban Network's "Power Jam" conference, where she was introduced and "received warmly". The album was originally scheduled for June 14, 1994, but due to the instant success of "Back & Forth"'s accompanying music video on MTV, the label was prompted to release the album three weeks earlier, on May 24.

Upon the albums July release in the United Kingdom Jive records planned to run radio advertisements on Kiss, Choice, Capital, Buzz and BRMB. Along with radio ads, press ads were expected to appear in The Voice, Echoes, Blues & Soul and Hip Hop Connection. In store promotions included window displays in HMV, and on Virgin listening displays. Overall, the campaign was to distribute both posters nationwide and a mail-out to the Jive database. Following the album's release, Aaliyah embarked on a 1994–1995 world tour, visiting the United States, Europe, Japan and South Africa. Aaliyah performed at the Budweiser Superfest at the USAir Arena in September 1994. In January 1995, she performed "Age Ain't Nothing but a Number" on the Nickelodeon sketch comedy show All That. On January 11 she performed at the Roanoke Civic Center in Roanoke, VA, followed by performances at the Wilcomico Civic Center in Salisbury, MD on the 13th, the Apollo Theatre in New York City on the 14th, and the Symphony Hall in Newark, NJ on the 15th. On May 1, 1995, Aaliyah made an appearance at the Virgin Megastore in London. Twelve days later on May 13, Aaliyah performed in concert at the Hammersmith Apollo in London. In July 1995 Aaliyah celebrated Essence magazine's 25th anniversary by performing at the magazine's first annual Essence Music Festival.

== Singles ==
"Back & Forth" was released as the album's lead single on April 8, 1994. It reached its peak of number five on the US Billboard Hot 100 three months after it was released, on July 2, 1994. The single reached its peak of number one on the Hot R&B/Hip-Hop Songs on May 21, 1994, becoming first of the three number-one singles by Aaliyah on this chart. Eventually, the single was certified gold by the Recording Industry Association of America (RIAA) on June 9, 1994, selling 700,000 copies in the country. On June 26, 1994, the song reached number 4 on The Times Southern California pop singles chart.

Internationally, "Back & Forth" became a top-forty hit in the United Kingdom and the Netherlands, peaking at numbers 16 and 38, respectively. In New Zealand, the song peaked at number 48. The album's second single "At Your Best (You Are Love)" was released on August 22, 1994, and it became Aaliyah's second top-ten hit on the Billboard Hot 100, peaking at number six. On the Hot R&B/Hip-Hop Songs, the song also reached the top ten, peaking at number two. The song received a gold certification by the RIAA on October 25, 1994. In other international markets, "At Your Best (You Are Love)" reached numbers 27, 38 and 40 in the UK, New Zealand and the Netherlands, respectively. "Age Ain't Nothing but a Number" was released as the third single and the final US single from the album. It peaked at number 75 on the Billboard Hot 100 on February 25, 1995. The song fared better on the UK charts, peaking at number 32, as well as at numbers 19 and six on the dance and R&B charts, respectively. The album's fifth and sixth singles "Down with the Clique" and "The Thing I Like" were released exclusively in the UK. "Down with the Clique" peaked at numbers 32, 25 and five on the official, dance and R&B charts, respectively. "The Thing I Like" peaked at numbers 33, 15 and four on the official, dance and R&B charts, respectively.

== Critical reception ==
Professional ratings
Review scores
| Source | Rating |
|---|---|
| AllMusic | 4/5 stars |
| Encyclopedia of Popular Music | 3/5 stars |
| Entertainment Weekly | B+ |
| The Rolling Stone Album Guide | 2.5/5 stars |
| Slant Magazine | 3/5 stars |

Age Ain't Nothing but a Number received generally favorable reviews from music critics. Some writers noted that Aaliyah's "silky vocals" and "sultry voice" blended with Kelly's new jack swing helped define R&B in the 1990s. Her sound was also compared to that of female quartet En Vogue. Christopher John Farley of Time described the album as a "beautifully restrained work", noting that Aaliyah's "girlish, breathy vocals rode calmly on R.Kelly's rough beats". Stephen Thomas Erlewine of AllMusic felt that the album had its "share of filler," but described the singles as "slyly seductive." He also claimed that the songs on the album were "frequently better" than that of Kelly's debut studio album 12 Play.

Paul Verna from Billboard praised both R. Kelly's production on the album and Aaliyah's voice, saying: "The golden production touch of mentor R. Kelly is strongly felt here, and he has a field day with Aaliyah's warm silky voice, which has a depth and range that belie her youth." Martin Johnson from the Chicago Reader was mixed in his review. He dismissed the album's lyrical content while praising its production, saying: "Aaliyah undercuts her own ploy with some of the most passionless singing about sex on disc. I only hope she fakes it better than she sings it. The song’s redeeming facet is Kelly’s production. In much the manner of acid jazz, he sandwiches layers of mellow vocals and smooth Soul II Soul-ish rhythms around jittery, frenetic beats and samples." Ultimately, he declared, "The record is far too casual for cruisin’ road, its tone is at best a good fit for a stoop. Perhaps by the time she grows up a bit, she’ll learn the difference". John Martinucci from the Gavin Report praised the album's lyrical content, saying: "If you thought Aaliyah's debut single "Back & Forth" climbed the charts at a feverish pace, wait until you see what happens with her album, Age Ain't Nothing But A Number. Tracks touch on images of romance, partying, and hanging with da homegirls with a teenage perspective that can be appreciated by all ages."

Connie Johnson from the Los Angeles Times gave the album a 2 out of 4 rating. Johnson felt that aside from “Back & Forth, the album was bland and that "as the mouthpiece of an adult male trying to express the thoughts of a pubescent girl, Aaliyah sounds trapped in an awkward stage". MTV.com praised the album and felt that "Aaliyah complements the album's material, appealing to both R&B; and hip-hop listeners, while managing to "keep it smooth with a jazz attitude." They also felt that the album had several highlights, including "soft, mellow tunes like "At Your Best (You Are Love)," "Young Nation," "Age Ain't Nothing But A Number" and "Down With The Clique." Maria Jiménez from Music & Media said, "On Age Ain't Nothing but a Number, Aaliyah kicks the same smoothness, seriousness and quality jams as her mentor/producer R.Kelly." Jiménez also felt that the album had numerous potential singles including "At Your Best (You Are Love)", "Young Nation", "No One Knows How to Love Me Quite Like You Do" and "Throw Your Hands Up".

In their review, the New Sunday Times said: "A sort of global karma, re-adjustment of earth, the 3rd stone from the sun, where the material fuses with the spiritual universe, eventually to become one. Hinged onto this oneness is this idea about Age Ain't Nothing but a Number." Music editors from RPM praised the album for being a "perfect female companion" to R. Kelly's 12 Play. The editors also felt that the album was filled with many "ear pleasing numbers" and that Aaliyah was next in line behind Whitney Houston, Mariah Carey and Toni Braxton as a "chart topping queen". Tonya Pendleton from The Washington Post felt that Aaliyah's voice "has the maturity of someone much older", as well as saying also she stood out because of her "uniquely mellifluous tone" and "the eloquent way she expresses the heartfelt passion of first love". Overall she felt that Age Ain’t Nothing but a Number "is that rarest of recordings — a collection well suited for its teenage target group, but one that even older listeners can relate to".

== Accolades ==
Accolades for Age Ain't Nothing but a Number
| Year | Award | Category | Nominee(s) | Result | Ref. |
|---|---|---|---|---|---|
| 1994 | Billboard Music Video Award | Best New R&B/Urban Artist Clip of the Year | "Back & Forth" | Nominated | |
| 1995 | American Music Award | Favorite Soul/R&B New Artist | Aaliyah | Nominated | |
| 1995 | Soul Train Music Award | Best R&B/Soul or Rap New Artist | Aaliyah | Nominated | |
| 1995 | Soul Train Music Award | Best R&B/Soul Album, Female | Age Ain't Nothing but a Number | Nominated | |
| 1995 | Soul Train Lady of Soul Award | Best R&B/Soul New Artist | Aaliyah | Nominated | |

== Commercial performance ==
Age Ain't Nothing but a Number debuted at number 24 on the US Billboard 200 chart on the issue dated June 11, 1994, selling 38,000 copies in its first week. The album reached its peak at number 18 on June 11, 1994 and has spent a total of 37 weeks on the Billboard 200. On the US Top R&B/Hip-Hop Albums chart, the album debuted at number four. In its fourth week on the chart, the album peaked at number three during the week of July 2, 1994, spending a total of 41 weeks on the chart. By July 2001 the album had sold over three million copies in the United States according to Nielsen SoundScan. To date the album is certified double platinum by the Recording Industry Association of America (RIAA) for two million shipped units.

In Canada, the album debuted at number 29 on RPM' s Top Albums/CDs chart on July 18, 1994. In its 4th week on the chart, the album reached its peak at number 20 on August 8, 1994. Overall, the album has spent a total of 25 consecutive weeks on the Top Albums/CDs chart. On December 12, 1994, the album was certified gold by Music Canada for 50,000 copies shipped in the country. In the United Kingdom, the album peaked at numbers 23 and six on the UK Albums Chart and UK R&B Chart, respectively. Following the May 15, 2026, reissue on vinyl, Age Ain't Nothing But A Number re-entered the UK R&B Albums Chart at number 13. Eventually, the album was certified gold in the UK by the British Phonographic Industry (BPI) for 100,000 copies in shipments. On other European charts, Age Ain't Nothing but a Number peaked at number 44 on Dutch Albums Chart and at number 90 on the European Top 100 Albums chart. In Japan, the album was certified gold by the Recording Industry Association of Japan (RIAJ) for shipments of 100,000 units. As of 2014, the album has sold 6 million copies worldwide, according to Vibe.

== Controversy ==
Aaliyah reportedly developed a friendship with R. Kelly during the recording of her debut album. As she recalled to Vibe magazine in 1994, she and Kelly would "go watch a movie" and "go eat" when she got tired and would then "come back and work". She described their relationship as being "rather close". There was speculation about a secret marriage with the release of Age Ain't Nothing but a Number amidst the adult content that Kelly had written for Aaliyah. Vibe magazine later revealed a marriage certificate that listed the couple married on August 31, 1994, in Rosemont, Illinois. Aaliyah, who was 15 at the time, was listed as 18 on the certificate; the illegal marriage was annulled in February 1995 by her parents. The pair continued to deny marriage allegations, stating that the certificate was a forgery. It was speculated that Aaliyah wedded Kelly without her parents' knowledge. In December 1994, Aaliyah told the Sun-Times that she and Kelly were "close" and "people took it the wrong way".

Age Ain't Nothing but a Number is the only Aaliyah album that Kelly produced for, and in May 1997, Aaliyah filed suit in Cook County seeking to have all records of the marriage expunged because she was not old enough under state law to get married without her parents' consent. Aaliyah admitted in court documents that she had lied about her age. She reportedly cut off all professional and personal ties with Kelly and ceased having contact with him. Aaliyah avoided answering questions regarding Kelly following the professional split and responded "no" when asked if she would ever work with him again. In 2014, Jomo Hankerson stated that Aaliyah "got villainized" within the music industry over the controversy and expressed confusion over why "they were upset" with Aaliyah given her age at the time.

R. Kelly would have other allegations made about him regarding underage girls in the years following her death, and his marriage to Aaliyah was used to evidence his involvement with them. He has often refused to discuss his relationship with her, citing her death. In 2004, he stated: "That was a whole other situation, a whole other time, it was a whole other thing, and I'm sure that people also know that." In 2016, Kelly said that he was in love with Aaliyah as he was with "anybody else". However, the allegations have been said to have done "little to taint Aaliyah's image or prevent her from becoming a reliable '90s hitmaker with viable sidelines in movies and modeling."

== Track listing ==
All songs were written and produced by R. Kelly, except for "At Your Best (You Are Love)", written by Ernie Isley, Marvin Isley, O'Kelly Isley, Jr., Ronald Isley, Rudolph Isley and Chris Jasper of The Isley Brothers.

Age Ain't Nothing but a Number – Standard edition
| No. | Title | Length |
|---|---|---|
| 1. | "Intro" | 1:30 |
| 2. | "Throw Your Hands Up" | 3:34 |
| 3. | "Back & Forth" | 3:51 |
| 4. | "Age Ain't Nothing but a Number" | 4:13 |
| 5. | "Down with the Clique" | 3:24 |
| 6. | "At Your Best (You Are Love)" | 4:51 |
| 7. | "No One Knows How to Love Me Quite Like You Do" | 4:07 |
| 8. | "I'm So into You" | 3:25 |
| 9. | "Street Thing" | 4:58 |
| 10. | "Young Nation" | 4:40 |
| 11. | "Old School" | 3:17 |
| 12. | "I'm Down" | 3:16 |
| 13. | "Back & Forth" (Mr. Lee & R. Kelly's remix; bonus track) | 3:45 |
| Total length: | | 48:51 |

Age Ain't Nothing but a Number – European, Japanese and vinyl edition
| No. | Title | Length |
|---|---|---|
| 13. | "The Thing I Like" | 3:28 |
| 14. | "Back & Forth" (Mr. Lee & R. Kelly's remix) | 3:45 |
| Total length: | | 52:19 |

Age Ain't Nothing but a Number – Japanese 1997 reissue edition (bonus track)
| No. | Title | Length |
|---|---|---|
| 15. | "Back & Forth" (Ms. Mello remix) | 3:10 |
| Total length: | | 55:29 |

Age Ain't Nothing but a Number – Japanese 2006 reissue edition
| No. | Title | Length |
|---|---|---|
| 13. | "The Thing I Like" | 3:28 |
| 14. | "At Your Best (You Are Love)" (Gangstar Child remix) | 4:30 |
| 15. | "At Your Best (You Are Love)" (Stepper's Ball remix) | 3:10 |
| Total length: | | 56:14 |

== Personnel ==
Credits adapted from the album's liner notes.

- Aaliyah – primary artist, vocals, backing vocals
- Timmy Allen – bass
- Lafayette Carthon – keyboards
- George Clinton – composer
- Bootsy Collins – composer
- Tom Coyne – mastering
- Stephanie Edwards – backing vocals
- Barry Hankerson – executive producer
- Tia Hawkins – rap vocals
- Keith Henderson – guitar
- Stephanie Huff – backing vocals
- Ernie Isley – composer
- Marvin Isley – composer
- O'Kelly Isley – composer
- Ronald Isley – composer
- Rudolph Isley – composer
- Chris Jasper – composer
- R. Kelly – composer, guest artist, instrumentation, mixing, producer, rap, remixing, backing vocals
- Doug McBride – mixing assistant
- Mr. Lee – mixing, remixing
- Peter Mokran – engineer, mixing, programming
- Joshua Shapera – mixing assistant
- Garry Shider – composer
- David Spradley – composer
- Stefon Taylor – mixing assistant
- Maria Valencia – design
- Bernie Worrell – composer
- Philippé Wynne – composer

== Charts ==
=== Weekly charts ===
1994 weekly chart performance for Age Ain't Nothing but a Number
| Chart (1994) | Peak position |
|---|---|
| Canada Top Albums/CDs (RPM) | 20 |
| Dutch Albums (Album Top 100) | 44 |
| European Top 100 Albums (Music & Media) | 90 |
| Japanese Albums (Oricon) | 89 |
| UK Albums (Official Charts) | 23 |
| UK R&B Albums (Official Charts) | 6 |
| UK Dance Albums (Music Week) | 2 |
| US Billboard 200 | 18 |
| US Top R&B/Hip-Hop Albums (Billboard) | 3 |

2001–2002 weekly chart performance for Age Ain't Nothing but a Number
| Chart (2001–2002) | Peak position |
|---|---|
| UK Independent Albums (Official Charts) | 49 |
| US Top Catalog Albums (Billboard) | 15 |

2026 weekly chart performance for Age Ain't Nothing but a Number
| Chart (2026) | Peak position |
|---|---|
| UK R&B Albums (Official Charts) | 13 |

=== Year-end charts ===
Year-end chart performance for Age Ain't Nothing but a Number
| Chart (1994) | Position |
|---|---|
| US Billboard 200 | 74 |
| US Top R&B/Hip-Hop Albums (Billboard) | 11 |

== Certifications ==
Certifications for Age Ain't Nothing but a Number
| Region | Certification | Certified units/sales |
|---|---|---|
| Canada (Music Canada) | Gold | 50,000^{^} |
| Japan (RIAJ) | Gold | 100,000^{^} |
| United Kingdom (BPI) | Gold | 100,000^{^} |
| United States (RIAA) | 2× Platinum | 3,000,000 |
Summaries
| Worldwide | — | 6,000,000 |
^{^} Shipments figures based on certification alone.

== Release history ==
Release history and formats for Age Ain't Nothing but a Number
| Region | Date | Edition(s) | Format(s) | Label(s) | Ref. |
|---|---|---|---|---|---|
| United States | May 24, 1994 | Standard | CD | Blackground; Jive | |
| Canada | June 24, 1994 | Standard | CD | Jive; Zomba | |
| United Kingdom | July 11, 1994 | Standard | CD | Jive | |
| Japan | July 21, 1994 | Standard | CD | BMG | |
| Japan | March 21, 1997 | 1997 reissue | CD | Avex Trax | |
| Japan | November 22, 2006 | 2006 reissue | CD | BMG Japan | |
| Various | November 28, 2014 | Standard | Vinyl (limited) | Legacy | |
| Various | May 15, 2026 | Standard | Vinyl | Sony Music | |

== See also ==
- Album era

== Bibliography ==
- Bogdanov, Vladimir; Woodstra, Chris; Erlewine, Stephen Thomas (2002). AllMusic Guide to Rock. Hal Leonard Corporation. p. 1. ISBN 0-87930-653-X.
- Brackett, Nathan; Hoard, Christian David (2004). The New Rolling Stone Album Guide: Completely Revised and Updated 4th Edition. Simon & Schuster. ISBN 0-7432-0169-8.
- Farley, John (2002). Aaliyah: More Than a Woman. Simon & Schuster. ISBN 0-7434-5566-5.
- Graff, Gary; Freeman Du Lac, Josh; McFarlin, Jim (1998). Musichound R&B: The Essential Album Guide. Schirmer Trade Books. p. 1. ISBN 0825672554.
- Kenyatta, Kelly (2002). An R&B Princess in Words and Pictures. Amber Books Publishing. ISBN 0-9702224-3-2.
- Larkin, Colin (2011). Encyclopedia of Popular Music. Omnibus Press. p. 1914. ISBN 978-0857125958.
- Sutherland, William (2005). Aaliyah Remembered. Trafford Publishing. ISBN 1-4120-5062-6.
- Warner, Jennifer (2014). Aaliyah: A Biography. BookCap Study Guides. ISBN 9781629173597.
