= The Thing I Like =

Single by Aaliyah

from the album Age Ain't Nothing but a Number
- Released: August 28, 1995
- Recorded: 1994
- Studio: Chicago Recording Company (Chicago)
- Length: 3:24
- Label: Blackground; Jive
- Songwriter: R. Kelly
- Producer: R. Kelly

Aaliyah singles chronology
| "I Need You Tonight" (1995) | "The Thing I Like" (1995) | "Live and Die for Hip Hop" (1996) |

Audio video
- "The Thing I Like" on YouTube

"The Thing I Like" is a song recorded by American singer Aaliyah for her debut studio album Age Ain't Nothing but a Number (1994). It was written and produced by R. Kelly. The song appeared on the soundtrack for the film A Low Down Dirty Shame (1994). It was released as the fifth and final single from Age Ain't Nothing but a Number exclusively in the United Kingdom on August 28, 1995, by Blackground Records and Jive Records.

A moderate commercial success, "The Thing I Like" peaked at number 33 on the UK Singles Chart, becoming her fifth consecutive top-40 single in the United Kingdom.

== Composition and reception ==
In his biography Aaliyah (2021), author Tim Footman described "The Thing I Like", as a "breezy song of young love with a catchy synth riff". Footman also said that it "juxtaposed Aaliyah's soft soul vocals with insistent rapping, like a grab bag of contemporary black music".

In a review of the A Low Down Dirty Shame soundtrack, David Browne from Entertainment Weekly felt that "The Thing I Like", along with the other songs, was "more workmanlike than inspired". James Masterton wrote in his weekly UK chart commentary, "A fifth smallish hit single for the most alphabetically pronounced act in chart history." Masterson, also thought "her succession of small chart hits is showing remarkable consistency". Ralph Tee from Music Week gave the song a 3 out of 5 rating, while also highlighting that "Aaliyah's latest single from her debut album comes in for broader styles" due to its remixes. He also felt that both the garage and house remixes takes her into "new waters."

== Commercial performance ==
"The Thing I Like" was released as the fifth and final single from Age Ain't Nothing but a Number exclusively in the United Kingdom, being Aaliyah's second consecutive UK-only single. It debuted and peaked at number 33 on the UK Singles Chart, dated September 9, 1995. The same week, it debuted and peaked at number four on the UK R&B Singles Chart. Additionally, it peaked at number 15 on the UK Dance Singles Chart the following week.

== Track listings and formats ==
UK 12-inch vinyl

1. "The Thing I Like" (album version) – 3:21
2. "The Thing I Like" (Paul Gotel's Classic Anthem Mix) – 6:48
3. "The Thing I Like" (Paul Gotel's Deep & Dubby Mix) – 6:29
4. "The Thing I Like" (PG Tips Satellite Mix) – 7:21

UK maxi CD single

1. "The Thing I Like" (album version) – 3:21
2. "The Thing I Like" (Paul Gotel's Radio Mix) – 3:57
3. "The Thing I Like" (Paul Gotel's Classic Anthem Mix) – 6:48
4. "The Thing I Like" (PG Tips Satellite Mix) – 7:21
5. "The Thing I Like" (Paul Gotel's Deep & Dubby Mix) – 6:29

== Charts ==
Weekly chart performance for "The Thing I Like"
| Chart (1995) | Peak position |
|---|---|
| Scotland Singles (OCC) | 86 |
| UK Singles (OCC) | 33 |
| UK Dance (OCC) | 15 |
| UK Hip Hop/R&B (OCC) | 4 |

== Release history ==
Release dates and formats for "The Thing I Like"
| Region | Date | Format(s) | Label(s) | Ref. |
|---|---|---|---|---|
| United Kingdom | August 28, 1995 | 12-inch vinyl; maxi CD | Jive | |

== Bibliography ==
- Footman, Tim (2021). Aaliyah. Plexus Publishing Limited. ISBN 9780859657136.
