= Are You Ready (Aaliyah song) =

1996 single by Aaliyah

Promotional single by Aaliyah

from the album Sunset Park (soundtrack)
- Released: March 26, 1996
- Recorded: October 1995
- Studio: Battery Studios (New York City, New York)
- Genre: R&B
- Length: 4:07
- Label: Elektra
- Songwriter: Renee Neufville
- Producer: DJ Kay Gee

"Are You Ready" is an R&B song performed by singer Aaliyah. The song was written by Renee Neufville (of the R&B duo Zhané) and produced by DJ Kay Gee of Naughty by Nature for the soundtrack to the basketball film Sunset Park (1996). It was released as a promotional radio single for the soundtrack.

This song samples "Movin' in the Right Direction" as performed by Steve Parks.

== Composition ==
The song was described by Complex as being a "low-key summertime party groove" that makes use of a "wistful jazz fusion guitar sample" over hip hop drums.

== Chart performance ==
"Are You Ready" received moderate airplay on some major market urban contemporary radio stations causing it to peak at #42 on the Billboard Hot R&B/Hip-Hop Airplay Chart. It was not eligible for the Billboard charts due to the song never being commercially released as a single.

== Critical reception ==
Brendan Frederick from Complex felt that the song was "The first sign that Aaliyah would survive the scandal" with R.Kelly and that it proved that Aaliyah "had a distinctive sound and an identity that was bigger than any one producer". According to Frederick Aaliyah taunts the critics who counted her out on the hook of the song by saying "You know I'm comin' back—tell me if you're ready."

== Charts ==
Chart (1996)	Peak position
US R&B/Hip-Hop Airplay (Billboard)	42
