= Chicago Recording Company =

Recording studio in Chicago, Illinois

Chicago Recording Company CRC Music & Post
- Industry: Recording studio
- Founded: 1975
- Headquarters: Chicago, Illinois, United States
- Website: chicagorecording.com

Chicago Recording Company, or CRC, is a recording studio in Chicago, Illinois, founded in 1975. Boasting twelve studios, CRC is the largest recording company in the Midwest, and the largest independent studio in the country.

== History ==
=== Early history ===
Originally called Sound House Studios, CRC was founded by Alan Kubicka in Medinah, Illinois. In 1975 the studio moved to Michigan Avenue in Chicago, and became Chicago Recording Company. Early records made there include Lovin' Feeling by Phil Upchurch and Don't Fight The Feeling by Jim Peterik.

=== Music ===
CRC has been host to dozens of notable artists that have recorded at the company's music studios. Notably, The Smashing Pumpkins have used the studio numerous times since the mid-1990s. The video for their single "Untitled" features the band recording in Chicago Recording Company. Others to record at CRC include Michael Jackson, Carole King, Coldplay, Sting, Timbaland, Rihanna, Styx, Justin Timberlake, Queen Latifah, Death Cab for Cutie, Mavis Staples, Jeremih, Smokey Robinson, Celine Dion, The Cure, Jennifer Hudson, Lady Gaga, Changing Faces, Justin Bieber, Kanye West, Stone Temple Pilots, Resurrection Band, Liz Phair, Duran Duran, Ohio Players, Nine Inch Nails, Red Hot Chili Peppers, R. Kelly, Linkin Park, Alicia Keys, Garbage, Britney Spears, Aaliyah, Pharrell Williams, Snoop Dogg, Ice Cube and Wilco. The Chicago Cubs' anthem, "Go, Cubs, Go" was recorded at CRC in 1984.

=== Post ===
Equally notable are the numerous film, television, and gaming productions that the studio's engineers have contributed to, including Watchmen, Toy Story, The Dark Knight, Boardwalk Empire, CSI: NY, Black Swan, and NHL 15.

== Selected recordings ==
Album or song	Artist	Date	US Billboard chart	Notes
Coloring Book (mixtape)	Chance The Rapper	2016	#6	
Girl	Pharrell Williams	2014	#2	
Artpop	Lady Gaga	2013	#1	
Midwinter Graces	Tori Amos	2009	#66	
Good Girl Gone Bad: Reloaded	Rihanna	2008	#7	
Universal Mind Control	Common	2008	#12	
Tick Tick Boom	The Hives	2007	#36	
X&Y	Coldplay	2005	#1	
Confessions Part II	Usher	2004	#1	
Yankee Hotel Foxtrot	Wilco	2002	#13	
Whitechocolatespaceegg	Liz Phair	1998	#35	
Evolution	Boyz II Men	1997	#1	
Being There	Wilco	1996	#73	
I Believe I Can Fly	R. Kelly	1996	#2	
Mellon Collie and the Infinite Sadness	Smashing Pumpkins	1995	#1	
HIStory: Past, Present and Future, Book I	Michael Jackson	1995	#1	
Age Ain't Nothing But A Number	Aaliyah	1994	#18	
What If	Tommy Shaw	1985	#87	
