= Aaliyah (album) =

Studio album by Aaliyah
- Released: July 7, 2001
- Recorded: 1998 – March 2001
- Studios: Magic Mix (Los Angeles); Music Grinder (Los Angeles); Westlake (Los Angeles); Manhattan Center (New York); Soundtracks (New York); Sony (New York); Sing Sing (Melbourne)
- Genres: R&B; neo soul; pop; dance-pop; hip-hop
- Length: 61:10
- Labels: Blackground; Virgin
- Producers: Bud'da; Eric Seats; J. Dub; Rapture; Timbaland

Aaliyah chronology
One in a Million (1996)	Aaliyah (2001)	I Care 4 U (2002)

Singles from Aaliyah
- 1. "We Need a Resolution" Released: April 13, 2001; 2. "Rock the Boat" Released: August 21, 2001; 3. "More Than a Woman" Released: September 4, 2001

Aaliyah is the third and final studio album by the American singer Aaliyah. It was released on July 7, 2001, by Blackground Records and Virgin Records. (Note: The album was first issued in Japan on July 7, 2001, before its release in the US on July 17.) Because of its packaging design, it is also known as "The Red Album". Aaliyah started to work on the album in 1998, but rescheduled its recording around her developing film career. She resumed recording in 2000 at Sing Sing Studios in Australia, where she shot her role for the 2002 film Queen of the Damned during the day and recorded songs at night. Additional recording took place at Manhattan Center and Sony Music Studios in New York and Westlake Recording Studios in Los Angeles, among other locations. Through her recording contract with Blackground, the singer worked primarily with the record label's in-house crew of writers and producers, including Bud'da, J. Dub, Rapture, and Eric Seats, as well as longtime collaborator Timbaland.

Aaliyah is described in critical commentaries as an album of R&B, neo soul, and dance-pop, while drawing on an array of other genres such as funk, hip-hop, alternative rock, electronica, and Latin music. The album's producers incorporated synthesizer melodies, fragmented beats, distorted guitar, and eccentrically manipulated vocals and song structures, while much of the lyrics were written by singer-songwriter Static Major, who shared a close friendship and strong rapport with Aaliyah. The resulting songs deal with the complexities of romantic love and different stages in a relationship. Aaliyah viewed the album as a reflection of herself as both a young adult and a matured vocalist.

Aaliyah was critically and commercially well-received upon release, charting at number two on the US Billboard 200. However, it sold diminishingly afterwards. After the album's first single "We Need a Resolution" performed moderately, Blackground and Virgin wanted a high-charting follow-up to increase the album's sales. The labels chose "Rock the Boat" after it began receiving airplay as an album cut. Aaliyah shot a music video for the song in the Bahamas, but died in a plane crash during a return flight to the US on August 25. After her death, sales of the album greatly increased and led it to the top of the Billboard 200, eventually reaching more than 13 million copies sold worldwide. Released during a period of peak activity in R&B, critics have since ranked the album as one of the genre's best and most influential records from this era. After years of internal and legal conflicts between Blackground, the singer's estate, and the album's creators, Aaliyah was released to music streaming services for the first time in 2021.

== Background ==
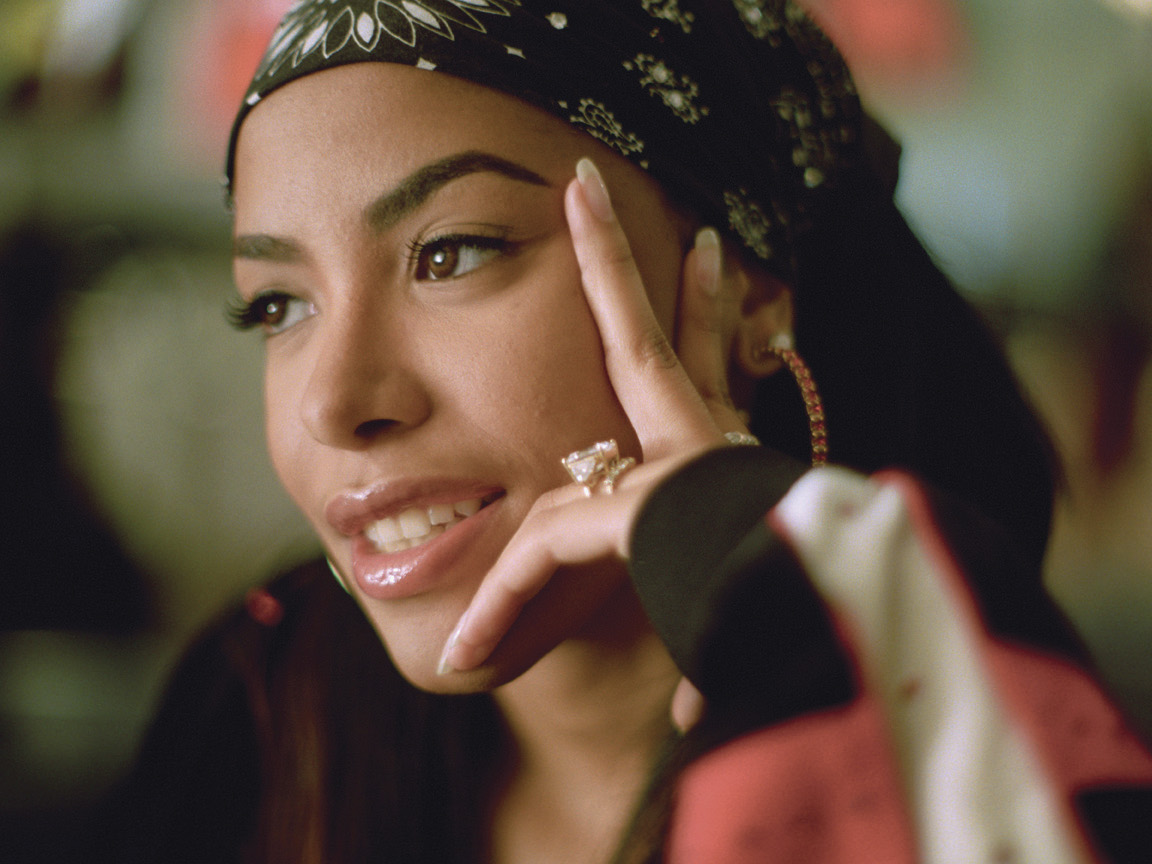
Aaliyah in 2000

Aaliyah recorded her second album One in a Million with producer-songwriters Timbaland and Missy Elliott, releasing it in 1996 to commercial success, and graduated from high school the following year. She gained achieved further success with songs from film soundtracks, including her 1998 single "Are You That Somebody?" Recording again with Timbaland for the song, Aaliyah experimented with more avant-garde sounds in her R&B and pop music, while singing in a low-register and minimalist style distinct from her vocally-virtuosic female contemporaries. After it became the biggest success of her career at that point, the singer wanted to keep a lower profile and avoid overexposure.

A third album was planned for February 1999, but Aaliyah postponed its recording to develop an acting career, which led to a starring role in the 2000 film Romeo Must Die. The film heightened her profile significantly, while the soundtrack's single "Try Again" became her first number-one song on the US Billboard Hot 100. Her label Blackground Records used the film and its soundtrack to set up a distribution deal with Virgin Records America, which would distribute Blackground's subsequent releases globally.

== Recording and production ==
Aaliyah began recording the album in 1998. She recorded a few songs, including two with Timbaland, before working on Romeo Must Die. In 1999, while working on the record in New York City, Aaliyah called and asked Trent Reznor, one of her musical idols, to produce a song, but they could not coordinate their schedules. She intended to finish the album by the end of 2000 and resumed its recording while filming in Australia for Queen of the Damned (2002), as she shot her part for the film during the day and recorded songs at night. She said in an interview for Billboard, "there were nights when I didn't go into the studio—I was too tired. On the weekends, I always made it." Jomo Hankerson, Blackground president and Aaliyah's cousin, said that he had to "bribe the producers", who did not want to "go halfway around the world!" He added that they ultimately had "a beautiful time ... making hot music".

Most of the album's songs were recorded at either Sony Studios in New York City or Sing Sing Studios in Melbourne, including "Loose Rap", which was done at both studios. Aaliyah recorded "More Than a Woman" at Manhattan Center Studios, "U Got Nerve" at Soundtracks Studios in New York City, "We Need a Resolution" at Westlake Studios, and "I Care 4 U" at Magic Mix Studios and Music Grinder Studios in Los Angeles. She had first recorded "I Care 4 U", written by Elliott, in 1996 for One in a Million, but scrapped it after that album's completion. Aaliyah worked with Blackground Records' in-house crew of musicians, songwriters, and producers, including novice producers Bud'da, J. Dub, Rapture, and Eric Seats. Music manager Jimmy Henchman, a friend of Aaliyah's manager Barry Hankerson, helped coordinate the record's production and arranged for the producers and writers to work with the singer.

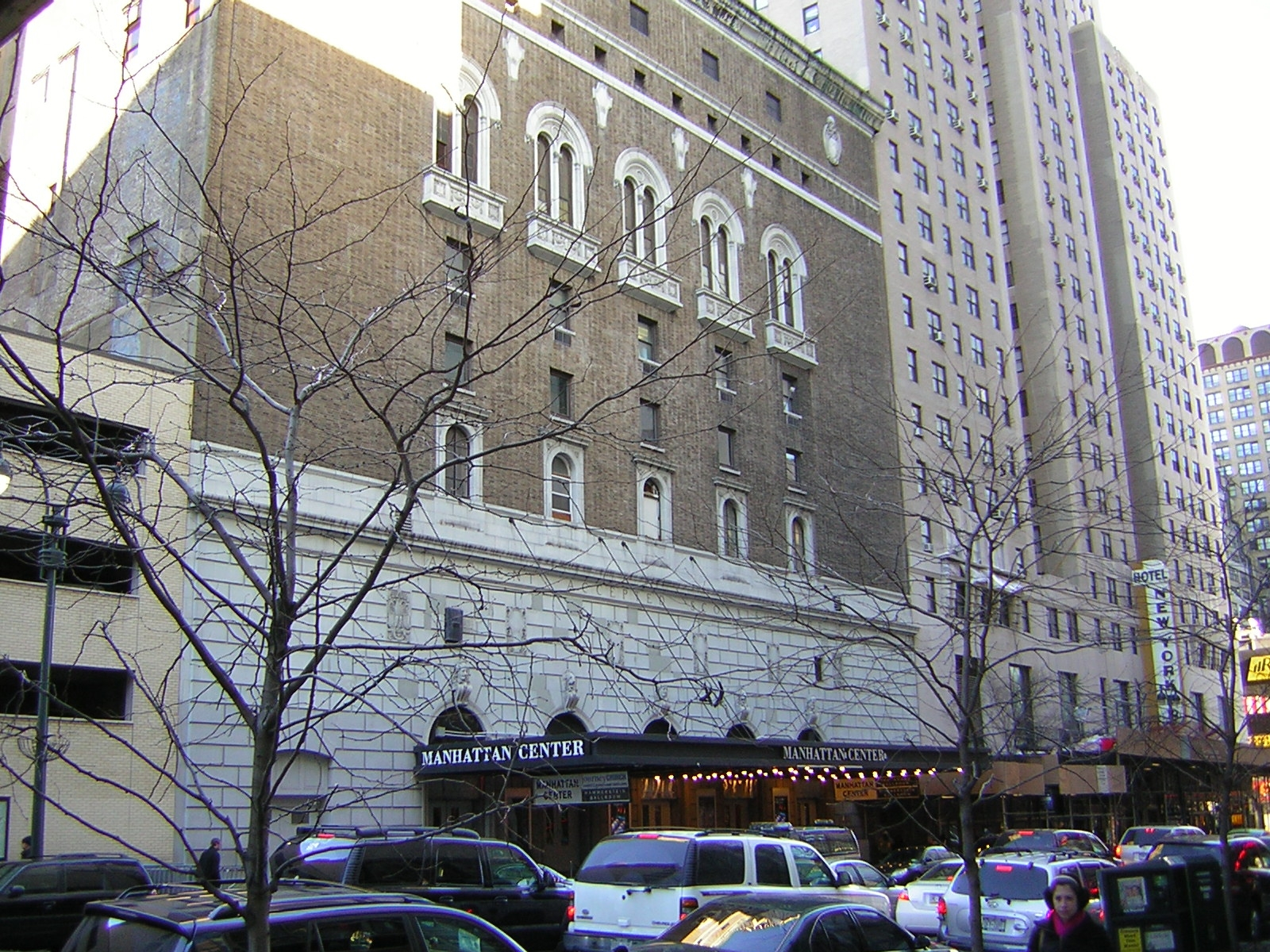
Manhattan Center (2008), where a part of the album was recorded

Most of the album's lyrics were written by Static, from the R&B band Playa. While the band was growing apart, he was invited by Blackground to be a lead writer for the album after writing "Are You That Somebody?" and "Try Again". Static was a part of Aaliyah's close group of friends, which included Missy Elliott and Timbaland, and shared an infatuation with her. He found Aaliyah to be ideal for his songwriting style, while she believed that he could accurately portray her feelings. A subtly sexual lyricist, he wrote "Rock the Boat" for her in 1999, but Blackground felt she was not ready for the song. Barry Hankerson said of his songwriting, "We always were protective over every lyric ... But he did things where you never felt offended. You just felt like you overheard someone thinking ... he was clever ... Aaliyah depended on him [and] he depended on her." Elliott said that he was "a part of that bridge of Aaliyah growing up lyrically". While she discussed the lyrics with Static, the singer consulted Bud'da about the sound and musical direction of the album. She was interested in learning about the UK garage scene at the time.

In March 2001, Aaliyah finished recording the album after having filmed her part in Queen of the Damned for four months, which ultimately delayed the album's release. MTV News's Gideon Yago reported that she completed its last song on March 9, and the album as a whole was mastered by Bernie Grundman at his studio in Los Angeles.

While in Australia, Aaliyah also did a photo shoot for the album with photographers Jeff Dunas, Jonathan Mannion, David LaChapelle, and Albert Watson. The singer handled five pythons at the shoot and developed an affinity for snakes, finding them "dangerous, but quite beautiful" and representative of her on the album. She revisited the snake theme in her music video for "We Need a Resolution" in April 2001 and told MTV, "They live in solitude, [and] there are times in my life [when] I just want to be by myself. There are times I can't even figure myself out. I feel they are very complex creatures, [but] at the same time, they're sexy, too. That's why they represent Aaliyah pretty well." Ultimately, Watson's photo of Aaliyah posing directly at the camera was chosen by artwork designer Warren Fu to be the front cover, with Watson later explaining that it especially demonstrated "a symmetrical composition ... with a look of confidence and maturity." (Note: Fu went on to explain in an interview for Vibe: "Perhaps it was a reaction to her being mysterious and aloof behind her sunglasses in previous covers, but this particular photo seemed to say 'Here I am, this is me.' It just felt like her arrival from her adolescent years to womanhood ... I wasn't sure why I decided to tint the cover photo red at the time. But there is something so bold and celebratory about it, it just felt right.") Of the album itself, Aaliyah called it "a good reflection of [myself] and the person [I am] today", saying in an interview for Jet magazine, "I am a young adult now, and I think this album shows my growth vocally."

== Music ==
Pop songs are struggles, conscious or not, between the artist's urge to do her own thing and the audience's desire for familiar satisfactions. How many stylistic tics before the big chorus? How much individual versus how much mass appeal? It's magnetic when you can hear the struggle—the drama of seduction, of whether you give yourself to the listener, and what happens then. That's the drama Aaliyah plays nonstop on her third album.

— Joshua Clover (Spin, 2001)

An R&B, neo soul, and dance-pop album, Aaliyah features midtempo funk songs, hip-hop-textured uptempo tracks, and slow jams that draw on older soul influences. Along with contemporary urban sounds, the music incorporates Middle-Eastern influences, muted alternative rock, and—particularly on Timbaland's songs for the album—Latin timbres. "Never No More" mixes both older soul and modern hip hop sounds with string arrangements by producer Bud'da, while "Read Between the Lines" is a rhythmic, digital samba with Latin percussion. Aaliyah's production features synthesizer melodies, vintage syndrums, distorted guitar, staccato arrangements, and layered, eccentrically manipulated vocals. John Mulvey of NME finds its sound subtle and lacking "bombast and histrionics", while the magazine's Alex Needham likens its "otherworldly", high frequency production to dub reggae and the dark, spacious dance music of Dr. Dre and Massive Attack. In Stephen Thomas Erlewine's opinion, the album is distinct from the older soul leanings of Macy Gray and Jill Scott, as its music sounds unconventional yet modern, "turning out a pan-cultural array of sounds, styles, and emotions".

Aaliyah's beats are produced in a manner that makes them sound fragmented, exhibiting techno and electro textures. Tracks such as "Loose Rap", "Extra Smooth", and "What If" feature unconventional song structures experimenting with resolution. "I Can Be" and "What If" incorporate 2-step and rock elements, although the latter song draws particularly from Detroit techno and industrial rock. On the club-influenced "More Than a Woman", Aaliyah's vocal harmonies interplay against minor key string and guitar sounds, while "Loose Rap" features underwater noises, low-key electronica in the style of the Neptunes, and harmonically soft vocals declaring "it ain't just rhythm and blues". Ernest Hardy of Rolling Stone compares the album's experimentation to the sounds on Outkast's Stankonia (2000), Sade's Lovers Rock (2000), and Missy Elliott's Miss E... So Addictive (2001). According to Slant Magazine's Sal Cinquemani, "like Elliott's genre-bending So Addictive, Aaliyah provides a missing link between hip-hop and electronica."

=== Lyrics ===
Thematically, Aaliyah explore the intricacies of romantic love and phases in a relationship, such as frivolous infatuation, issues near the end of a relationship, and heartache. Subtle, lighthearted humor and witty sound effects, such as comical vocal manipulation, intersperse the themes of heartbreak and eroticism. According to Citysearch's Justin Hartung, the record "transforms the confusion of young adulthood into exhilarating freedom", while Billboard's Rashaun Hall says that each song possess a unique emotional identity that accompanies the music's sonic variety.

Among the female empowerment-themed songs, Bob Waliszewski of Plugged In observes a "healthy self-respect" in Aaliyah, who "doesn't put up with unfaithful cads ('U Got Nerve'), mind games ('I Refuse'), self-impressed hunks ('Extra Smooth'), gossip and envy ('Loose Rap'), or physical abuse ('Never No More')". The key-shifting, drum and bass-influenced "Extra Smooth" addresses an enthusiastic courtship and is inspired by a conversation between Aaliyah and Static about how men try to act suave, while "Loose Rap" is titled after the slang phrase of the same name and dismisses romantic admirers who use trite pick-up lines. "Those Were the Days" dispassionately dismisses a male lover, while "What If" angrily threatens an unfaithful lover and by extension similar men. On "I Care 4 U", the narrator tries to console a friend who is heartbroken, but finds herself distressed by unrequited feelings she has for him.

=== Vocals ===
"More Than a Woman"
A dense arrangement of digital strings, synthetic bass, and lissome rhythms back the singer's promise to be "more than a woman" to a lover.

Aaliyah's vocals are sung in a restrained soprano style throughout the album. Vibe magazine's Hyun Kim argues that its songs draw focus to her singing more than her previous records, "bringing it to the forefront as opposed to hiding it behind the layered production". Biographer Christopher John Farley says that she "emotionally detail[s] a song" unlike on her previous albums and that "her gentle voice now seem[s] like something elemental, a kindly wind blowing through the branches of a big tree." According to Joshua Clover, Aaliyah pushes musical notes "into strange corners of syncopation's shifty architecture" on the more "shape-defying" tracks. Overall, "she makes the sonics tell the story, creating meaning outside the lyrics, pleasure beyond the hooks."

"Rock the Boat" is sung with breathless vocals by Aaliyah, who instructs her lover on how to please her sexually and equates her erotic high to a drug high. Ballads such as "I Care 4 U", "Never No More", and "I Refuse" are sung more emotively, expressing melancholy qualities and hurt. On "I Can Be", Aaliyah sings from the perspective of an adulterous man's mistress who wants to be his foremost girlfriend. Alex Macpherson from The Guardian writes that "Aaliyah's blank, numbed delivery" on the song "makes being the other woman seem like an emotionally masochistic form of self-medication".

== Marketing and sales ==
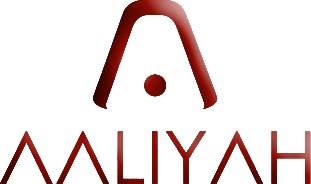
The red logo from Aaliyah's 2001 marketing campaign

Aaliyah was originally issued by Blackground and Virgin in Japan on July 7, 2001, before its release in the United Kingdom on July 16 and in the United States on July 17. In the US, it debuted at number two on the Billboard 200 albums chart behind Songs in A Minor by Alicia Keys, selling 187,000 copies in the week of August 4. Although it was the highest sales week of Aaliyah's career, the album sold diminishingly over the next two months. The singer planned to embark on the largest concert tour of her career to support the album, while Blackground and Virgin—heavily invested in the record's success—wanted a single with a high chart placement to help increase sales. "We Need a Resolution" had been released as the lead single on April 13, but did not receive significant radio airplay and only reached number fifty-nine on the Billboard Hot 100.

Aaliyah and Blackground were at odds as to what the second single from the album should be. She was pushing for "Rock the Boat" whereas the label was pushing for a Timbaland-produced track. In early August 2001, Aaliyah filmed a music video for the Timbaland-produced "More Than a Woman" in Los Angeles. The label opted for "Rock the Boat" as the album's second single after the track began receiving airplay as an album cut, and released the song as a single on August 21, 2001. On August 22, 2001, Aaliyah traveled to the Bahamas to shoot a video for "Rock the Boat". After its completion, she and several crew members who were returning to the US died in a plane crash on August 25. Blackground executives were uncertain when they would release the album's next single and video. Aaliyah had sold more than 447,000 copies by this point.

The album's sales increased rapidly after Aaliyah died. News of her death was reported on the last day of Nielsen SoundScan's sales tracking week, during which Aaliyah sold 62,000 copies, a 41.5% increase from its past week's sales. The following week, it sold 305,500 copies and ascended from number 19 to number one on the Billboard 200, making it the record's highest sales week. It was Aaliyah's only album to top any of Billboard's charts and marked the first time a recording artist climbed to number one posthumously since John Lennon in 1980 with his album Double Fantasy. On September 19, Aaliyah reached more than one million copies sold. In November, "Rock the Boat" was released as a single and reached number two on the R&B/Hip-Hop chart that same month. In the US, Aaliyah spent 69 weeks on the Billboard 200, reaching 2.06 million copies sold by February 25, 2002, and 2.6 million sold by December 2009.

Blackground, which had ended its joint deal with Virgin in November 2001, wanted to send the video for "More Than a Woman" (released on September 4) to domestic outlets, but it required both labels to work together. Blackground subsequently moved to Universal Records, and the video was first aired in Europe. In the UK, "More Than a Woman" was released as a single on January 7, 2002, and entered the singles chart at number one, while Aaliyah re-entered the albums chart at number 65; it had originally entered the chart at number 25 on July 28, 2001. Two weeks after "More Than a Woman" reached number one, the album jumped 17 spots to number five on January 27, 2002. Aaliyah went on to spend 36 weeks on the British charts. According to the Official Charts Company, the album sold a total of 303,000 copies in the UK. It also reached number nine on the record charts in France, Germany, and the Netherlands, where it charted for 33, 41, and 46 weeks, respectively. According to the International Federation of the Phonographic Industry (IFPI), the record was the 34th best-selling album in the world during 2001. In August 2012, NME writer Tom Goodwyn reported that it had sold more than 13 million copies worldwide.

== Critical reception ==
Aaliyah contemporary ratings
Aggregate scores
Source	Rating
Metacritic	76/100
Review scores
Source	Rating
AllMusic	5/5 stars
Entertainment Weekly	B+
The Guardian	4/5 stars
Los Angeles Times	2.5/4 stars
The New Zealand Herald	4/5 stars
NME	7/10
Q	3/5 stars
Rolling Stone	4/5 stars
Slant Magazine	4/5 stars
Spin	8/10

Aaliyah was met with highly positive reviews from most critics. At Metacritic, which assigns a normalized rating out of 100 to reviews from professional publications, the album received an average score of 76, based on 14 reviews. According to Pitchfork's Rawija Kameir, reviewers praised the singer for deviating from the "candy-coated" quality of contemporary pop music in favor of an approach that perfectly balanced pop, R&B, and hip hop. Rashaun Hall from Billboard felt that Aaliyah was taking a different approach in comparison to her pop/R&B peers, who "crank out happy-go-lucky albums year after year". He deemed the album as a "sonically diverse set in which each number has an emotion all its own".

Reviewing for The Guardian in July 2001, Michael Odell called Aaliyah a flawless blend of pop and R&B, "as much a brochure for the current state of R&B production facilities" as it is a showcase for its namesake's singing. He found the music's textures "scintillating" and believed its distinguishing characteristic to be "a playful and confident reworking of the [R&B] canon". In the Chicago Tribune, Brad Cawn wrote that Aaliyah demonstrates Sade's grace and Missy Elliott's daring with fashionable neo soul that is "equal parts attitude and harmony, and all urban music perfection", while Russell Baillie from The New Zealand Herald deemed the music innovative dance-pop on what he called "a cohesive, detailed and disarmingly enticing album". Simon Price, writing for The Independent, wrote the record was "further evidence that black pop is the avant garde". In a review for The A.V. Club, Nathan Rabin argued that the album establishes Aaliyah as a significant artist unobscured by her collaborators, while Hardy from Rolling Stone called it "a near-flawless declaration of strength and independence" in which Aaliyah explores her "fantasies and strengths". Writing for Spin, Clover viewed the record as her most profound work and said she had made "art" out of Timbaland and Static's "formal finesse" by "investing sound schemes with urgency and emotional intricacy".

Some reviewers were more qualified in their praise. Mulvey deemed Aaliyah "graceful" and "satisfying rather than extraordinary" in his review for NME. Although he said it is redeemed by Static's consistent songwriting, Timbaland should have contributed more songs, in his opinion. Like Mulvey, Q remarked that its music is decent rather than innovative, with some filler. In Entertainment Weekly, Craig Seymour wrote that there are a few songs that stray from her musical strengths, but elsewhere she "skillfully portrays love as part woozy thrill, part pulse-racing terror". Robert Christgau in The Village Voice named "We Need a Resolution" and "U Got Nerve" as highlights and called Aaliyah "a slave to her beats, but a proud slave". Connie Johnson from the Los Angeles Times was more critical, finding the production unadventurous and the lyrics lacking the depth and "personal revelation that gives music some immediacy". E! Online felt that although the album is "not as immediate as some of her past mainstream work", she "pushes the boundaries of her voice and her age". Ultimately the publication praised Aaliyah for "slowly working her way through R&B, hip-hop and even slightly techno beats". Although Luke McManus from the Irish publication RTÉ felt the album was too long, he praised it saying it was "the smoothest and most seductive R'n'B album of the year, with lyrics that are appealingly upfront and assertive".

Aaliyah was named the best album of 2001 by Slant Magazine and one of the ten best records of the year by The Atlanta Journal-Constitution and Time magazine. NME ranked it at number 39 on their year-end list. The album finished 73rd in the Pazz & Jop, an annual poll of American critics published by The Village Voice. Christgau, who created and supervised the poll, said in his accompanying essay that Aaliyah had finally "developed material nobody can deny" on "a good album". The record also finished 37th in the annual poll run by German music magazine Spex. For the album, Aaliyah was posthumously awarded an NAACP Image Award for Outstanding Female Artist. At the 2002 American Music Awards, it won in the category of Favorite R&B/Soul Album. In 2002, Aaliyah received a Grammy Award nomination for Best R&B Album. "Rock the Boat" was nominated for Best Female R&B Vocal Performance. "More Than a Woman" was nominated in the same category in 2003.

== Legacy ==
Aaliyah retrospective ratings
Review scores
Source	Rating
AllMusic	5/5 stars
Encyclopedia of Popular Music	4/5 stars
The Great Rock Discography	7/10
The New Rolling Stone Album Guide	4/5 stars
Pitchfork	9.3/10
Robert Christgau	(3-star Honorable Mention)

Along with Aaliyah's burgeoning film career, the album was a part of her rising mainstream success in 2001. In a retrospective review, Steve Huey from AllMusic called it her most consummate record and said it "completed the singer's image overhaul into a sensual yet sensitive adult". Erlewine, the website's senior editor, regarded the album as "a statement of maturity and a stunning artistic leap forward", while BBC Music's Daryl Easlea felt it made Aaliyah's two previous accomplished albums "look like exercises in juvenilia". According to PopMatters journalist Quentin B. Huff, she had never used her singing to complement her music's innovative production before with as much variety, conviction, and success as on Aaliyah, which he said was also known as "The Red Album" because of its red artwork. Huff believed the record showcased the growing rapport between the singer and her collaborators while disproving questions about how she would continue recording music while broadening her profile. In The New Rolling Stone Album Guide (2004), Keith Harris wrote that "Aaliyah had grown from studio puppet to a powerful R&B archetype—a more self-aware Ronnie Spector for a time that requires more self-awareness of its young adults."

Aaliyah's re-emergence with the album in mid-2001 coincided with a period of peak activity in contemporary R&B, as well as the popularity of neo soul. According to Erlewine, Aaliyah was "one of the strongest urban soul records of its time", while The Guardian called it the peak of R&B's golden age at the "turn of the century". Alexis Petridis, the newspaper's lead critic, believed Aaliyah had recorded her most engaging music in a year when R&B and hip hop demonstrated the most creativity in popular music. Aaliyah is widely considered to be one of the greatest pop albums of the 2000s and has been included on several "best-of" lists. In 2005, the Aaliyah album ranked 66th on GQ's "100 Coolest Albums in the World", while Stylus Magazine placed it at number 47 in the "Top 50 Albums of 2000–2005"; the publication's David Drake ranked it eighth on his own list. A few years later, it was named one of Vibe magazine's "150 Essential Albums of the Vibe Era", and at the end of the decade, it placed at number 72 on Slant Magazine's list of the best albums from the 2000s. Writing for Vibe's list, Jon Caramanica believed Aaliyah "may be the best soul album of the young millennium" and yet "redefines the category" with music that is "daring in construction, gorgeous from conception ... damn near post-R&B". The album was ranked number 77 on NPR's "The 150 Greatest Albums Made By Women" list and according to writer Stacia Irons, "Aaliyah became a catalyst and bridge that created a smooth transition from '90s style R&B into Modern PBR&B".

Aaliyah helped establish the "beat"-based sound of R&B during the 2000s while impacting a new wave of black progressive musicians. As The Independent's Micha Frazer-Carroll writes, acts such as Destiny's Child, Ashanti, Amerie, and Cassie capitalized on the success of the album's "idiosyncratic sound", while Aaliyah's "pared-back vocal phrasing" established an archetype for a "more stoic R&B singer" that would influence vocalists like Ciara and Rihanna. Timbaland's commercial success with R&B-influenced singers such as Justin Timberlake and Nelly Furtado during the decade was later attributed by The Guardian's Rebecca Nicholson to his experience producing Aaliyah, writing that he "hasn't come close to creating anything as sonically stunning since". Q journalist Eve Barlow credited the album in 2011 for "creating a blueprint that can be heard across pop music today" with acts such as R&B singers Beyoncé and The Weeknd, and the indie pop band The xx. According to Kameir, Aaliyah's characteristic multi-part harmonies on the album foreshadowed those of Solange Knowles. The Official Charts Company described the album as "one of the most influential R&B albums of modern times", and that it has "provided inspiration for an entire generation of hip-hop superstars like Beyonce, Frank Ocean and Janelle Monáe".

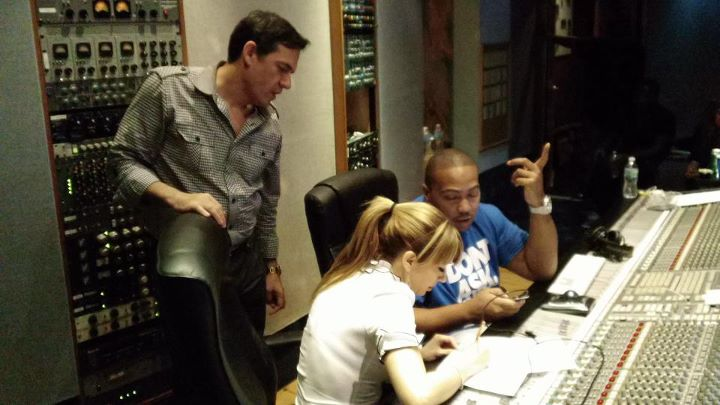
Timbaland (right center), one of the album's producers, in 2012

The recording sessions for the Aaliyah album produced many leftover tracks that were posthumously archived by Blackground and mostly left unreleased because of internal conflicts and legal complications between the label, Aaliyah's family, and the producers. Six of these recordings were released in 2002 on the compilation album I Care 4 U. Blackground's subsequent decline and mismanagement of the singer's catalog resulted in the Aaliyah album's unavailability on streaming services in the next decade, leading Kameir to say in 2019 that, "paradoxically to its significance, the legacy of Aaliyah is now diminished". That year, The Guardian ranked it number 28 on a list of the 100 best albums from the 21st century, making it the list's only album absent from streaming services. The newspaper's music editor, Ben Beaumont-Thomas, wrote in an accompanying blurb: "This album is lauded for the three masterpieces Aaliyah made with Timbaland—Try Again, More Than a Woman and We Need a Resolution—that lend a serpentine malevolence to her voice, but there are also strong old-school jams and languorous ballads. Lesser R&B stars match their voice to the beat—Aaliyah's genius, tragically cut short when she was killed in a plane crash, was to slink through it with an almost Latin sense of rhythm."

In August 2021, it was reported that the album and Aaliyah's other recorded work for Blackground (since rebranded as Blackground Records 2.0) would be rereleased on physical, digital, and streaming formats in a deal between the record label and Empire Distribution. However, Aaliyah's estate issued a statement in response to Blackground 2.0's announcement, denouncing the "unscrupulous endeavor to release Aaliyah's music without any transparency or full accounting to the estate". On September 10, Aaliyah appeared on streaming and music download services through Blackground and Empire. In the following weeks, it re-entered the US Billboard 200 at number 13 and at number seven on the Top R&B/Hip-Hop Albums and UK Hip Hop and R&B Albums charts.

== Track listing ==
Aaliyah standard edition
No.	Title	Lyrics	Music	Producer(s)	Length
1.	"We Need a Resolution" (featuring Timbaland)	Stephen Garrett	Timothy Mosley	Timbaland	4:02
2.	"Loose Rap" (featuring Static)	Garrett	Eric Seats; Rapture Stewart	Seats; Rapture	3:50
3.	"Rock the Boat"	Garrett	Seats; Stewart	Seats; Rapture	4:34
4.	"More Than a Woman"	Garrett	Mosley	Timbaland	3:49
5.	"Never No More"	Garrett	Stephen Anderson	Bud'da	3:56
6.	"I Care 4 U"	Melissa Elliott	Mosley; Carl Hampton; Homer Banks; (Note: Hampton and Banks were credited on the album's 2021 reissue. According to 92Q Jams journalist Keenan Higgins, their composition "(Too Little in Common to Be Lovers) Too Much Going to Say Goodbye" (recorded by the Newcomers in 1974) is sampled on the song.)	Timbaland	4:33
7.	"Extra Smooth"	Garrett	Seats; Stewart	Seats; Rapture	3:55
8.	"Read Between the Lines"	Garrett	Anderson	Bud'da	4:20
9.	"U Got Nerve"	Benjamin Bush	Seats; Stewart	Seats; Rapture	3:43
10.	"I Refuse"	Garrett	Jeffrey Walker	J. Dub	5:57
11.	"It's Whatever"	Garrett	Seats; Stewart	Seats; Rapture	4:08
12.	"I Can Be"	Durrell Babbs	Anderson	Bud'da	2:59
13.	"Those Were the Days"	Garrett	Seats; Stewart	Seats; Rapture	3:24
14.	"What If"	Babbs	Walker	J. Dub	4:24
Total length:					57:44

US and Canadian edition hidden track
No.	Title	Lyrics	Music	Producer(s)	Length
15.	"Messed Up"	Bush	Seats; Stewart	Seats; Rapture	3:34
Total length:					61:10

European and Japanese edition bonus track
No.	Title	Lyrics	Music	Producer(s)	Length
15.	"Try Again"	Garrett	Mosley	Timbaland	4:43
Total length:					62:19

International digital edition bonus tracks
No.	Title	Lyrics	Music	Producer(s)	Length
16.	"Miss You"	Johntá Austin	Teddy Bishop	Bishop	4:06
17.	"Don't Know What to Tell Ya"	Garrett	Mosley	Timbaland	5:02
18.	"Erica Kane"	Garrett	Seats; Stewart	Seats; Rapture	4:36
Total length:					76:05

== Personnel ==
Information is taken from the album credits.

- Aaliyah – executive production, vocals
- Jonathan Adler – engineering assistance (tracks 7, 8)
- The Black Orchestra – strings (track 5)
- Stevie Blacke – strings
- Ron Blake – horn (track 8)
- Chandler Bridges – engineering assistance (tracks 2, 3, 9)
- Bud'da – mixing, production (tracks 5, 8, 12)
- Michael Conrader – engineering (tracks 2, 5, 8, 9)
- Sean Cruse – guitar (track 12)
- J. Dub – instrumentation, production, programming (tracks 10, 14)
- Jimmy Douglass – engineering, mixing (tracks 1, 4, 6)
- Jeff Dunas – photography
- Missy Elliott – writing
- Warren Fu – art direction
- Ben Garrison – mixing (tracks 2, 3, 7–9, 11)
- Bernie Grundman – mastering
- Barry Hankerson – executive production
- Jomo Hankerson – executive production
- Richard "Segal" Huredia – mixing
- Dino "The Cut" Johnson – mixing (track 13)
- Acar Keys – engineering (tracks 2, 3, 7, 11, 13)
- David LaChapelle – photography
- Michelle Lynn-Forbes – engineering assistance (tracks 5, 12)
- Jonathan Mannion – photography
- Tim Olmstead – engineering assistance (track 11)
- Steve Penny – engineering assistance (track 4)
- Renzo Pryor – keyboards (track 5)
- Pat Sajack – engineering assistance (tracks 10, 14)
- Eric Seats – instrumentation, production, writing (tracks 2, 3, 7, 9, 11, 13)
- Richard Segal-Huredia – mixing (tracks 5, 12)
- Static – vocals, writing
- Rapture – instrumentation, production, writing (tracks 2, 3, 7, 9, 11, 13)
- Timbaland – mixing, production (tracks 1, 4), vocals
- Roberto "Gary" Walker – engineering assistance (track 2)
- Albert Watson – photography
- Scott Wolfe – engineer, mixing (tracks 10, 12, 14)
- Michael Zainer – engineering assistance (track 4)

== Charts ==
=== Weekly charts ===
Chart performance for Aaliyah
Chart (2001–2002)	Peak position
Australian Albums (ARIA)	41
Australian Urban Albums (ARIA)	7
Austrian Albums (Ö3 Austria)	21
Belgian Albums (Ultratop Flanders)	11
Belgian Albums (Ultratop Wallonia)	10
Canadian Albums (Billboard)	6
Canadian R&B Albums (Nielsen SoundScan)	6
Danish Albums (Hitlisten)	34
Dutch Albums (Album Top 100)	9
European Albums (Music & Media)	18
Finnish Albums (Suomen virallinen lista)	33
French Albums (SNEP)	9
German Albums (Offizielle Top 100)	9
Irish Albums (IRMA)	38
Italian Albums (FIMI)	40
Japanese Albums (Oricon)	17
New Zealand Albums (RMNZ)	25
Norwegian Albums (VG-lista)	30
Scottish Albums (OCC)	29
South African Albums (RISA)	1
Swedish Albums (Sverigetopplistan)	23
Swiss Albums (Schweizer Hitparade)	6
UK Albums (OCC)	5
UK R&B Albums (OCC)	1
US Billboard 200	1
US Top R&B/Hip-Hop Albums (Billboard)	2

Chart performance for Aaliyah 2021 reissue
Chart (2021)	Peak position
UK Album Downloads (OCC)	22
UK Independent Albums (OCC)	36
UK R&B Albums (OCC)	7
US Billboard 200	13
US Independent Albums (Billboard)	1
US Top R&B/Hip-Hop Albums (Billboard)	7

Chart performance for Aaliyah
Chart (2024)	Peak position
UK Independent Albums	37
UK R&B Albums (OCC)	13
UK Record Store Chart	35

=== Year-end charts ===
2001 year-end chart performance for Aaliyah
Chart (2001)	Position
Belgian Albums (Ultratop Wallonia)	100
Canadian Albums (Nielsen SoundScan)	119
Canadian R&B Albums (Nielsen SoundScan)	29
Dutch Albums (Album Top 100)	94
French Albums (SNEP)	76
German Albums (Offizielle Top 100)	77
Swiss Albums (Schweizer Hitparade)	86
US Billboard 200	51
US Top R&B/Hip-Hop Albums (Billboard)	15
Worldwide Albums (IFPI)	34

2002 year-end chart performance for Aaliyah
Chart (2002)	Position
Canadian R&B Albums (Nielsen SoundScan)	44
UK Albums (OCC)	98
US Billboard 200	69
US Top R&B/Hip-Hop Albums (Billboard)	27

=== Decade-end charts ===
Decade-end chart performance for Aaliyah
Chart (2000–2009)	Position
US Billboard 200	181
US Top R&B/Hip-Hop Albums (Billboard)	41

== Certifications ==
Certifications for Aaliyah
Region	Certification	Certified units/sales
Australia (ARIA)	Gold	35,000^{^}
Canada (Music Canada)	Platinum	100,000^{^}
France (SNEP)	Gold	100,000^{*}
Germany (BVMI)	Gold	150,000^{^}
Japan (RIAJ)	Gold	100,000^{^}
Netherlands (NVPI)	Gold	40,000^{^}
South Africa (RISA)	3× Platinum	150,000^{*}
Switzerland (IFPI Switzerland)	Gold	20,000^{^}
United Kingdom (BPI)	Platinum	303,000
United States (RIAA)	2× Platinum	2,000,000^{^}
^{*} Sales figures based on certification alone.^{^} Shipments figures based on certification alone.

== Release history ==
Release dates for Aaliyah
Region	Date	Label(s)	Ref.
Japan	July 7, 2001	Blackground; Virgin	
United Kingdom	July 16, 2001	Blackground; Virgin	
United States	July 17, 2001	Blackground; Virgin	
France	July 24, 2001	Blackground; Virgin	

== See also ==
- Album era
- Alternative R&B
- List of number-one albums of 2001 (U.S.)
- Progressive soul

== Bibliography ==
- Aaliyah (April 2001). "Aaliyah: Been a Long Time" (Interview). Interviewed by Elon Johnson; Curtis Waller. MTV. Archived from the original on November 12, 2012.
- Anon. (October 1998). "Aaliyah". Ebony. 53 (12). Chicago. Archived from the original on January 5, 2014 – via Google Books.
- Anon. (February 2, 1999). "Trent Reznor, Aaliyah Ponder Collaboration". MTV News. Archived from the original on June 22, 2012.
- Anon. (2001). Aaliyah (CD liner notes). Aaliyah. New York: Blackground Records. CDVUSY 199.
- Anon. (2001). Aaliyah (CD liner notes). Aaliyah. Blackground, Virgin Records. CDVUS199.
- Anon. (2001). Aaliyah (CD liner notes). Aaliyah. Blackground, Virgin Music Canada. 7243 8 10082 2 5.
- Anon. (November 26, 2001). "The ARIA Report: New Releases Singles – Week Commencing 26th November 2001" (PDF). Australian Recording Industry Association. p. 24. Archived from the original (PDF) on February 20, 2002.
- Anon. (2001). "Aaliyah's Number One". NME (January 13). London. Archived from the original on February 28, 2014.
- Anon. (July 23, 2001). "Sultry Singer Aaliyah On Why It's Cool To Be So Hot". Jet. 100 (6). Chicago. Archived from the original on January 5, 2014 – via Google Books.
- Anon. (2001). "Resolute in Success". Blues & Soul (July 24 – August 6). London.
- Anon. (September 2001). "Review: Aaliyah". Q (181). London.
- Anon. (December 15, 2001). "Whew! What a Year: Pop Music". The Atlanta Journal-Constitution. No. December 15. Archived from the original on January 9, 2014.
- Anon. (2001). "Aaliyah by Aaliyah: Top 10 Everything 2001". Time. No. December 21. New York. p. 154. Archived from the original on July 20, 2021.
- Anon. (December 24, 2001). "Aaliyah film finished by brother". BBC News. Archived from the original on March 9, 2013.
- Anon. (2001). "Albums of the Year 2001". NME (December 29). London: 59.
- Anon. (December 29, 2001). "The Year in Music 2001". Billboard. Vol. 113, no. 52. New York. Archived from the original on January 5, 2014 – via Google Books.
- "Aaliyah – Aaliyah". E! Online. July 17, 2001. Archived from the original on July 20, 2001.
- Anon. (January 27, 2002). "Iglesias Jr tops Harrison's hit". BBC News. Archived from the original on March 2, 2014.
- Anon. (2002). "2001 Kritiker". Spex (January). Berlin.
- Anon. (December 28, 2002). "The Year in Music 2002". Billboard. Vol. 114, no. 52. New York. Archived from the original on January 5, 2014 – via Google Books.
- Anon. (May 2, 2002). "Music Divas & Rock Bands Top South African Certifications". Mi2N. Archived from the original on February 12, 2015.
- Anon. (February 9, 2002). "European Top 100 Albums" (PDF). Music & Media. Archived (PDF) from the original on August 23, 2020.
- Anon. (August 3, 2001). "R&B : Top 50". Jam!. Archived from the original on August 5, 2001.
- Anon. (August 17, 2001). "CHR/Rhythmic: Going For Adds 8/21/01" (PDF). Radio & Records. p. 44 – via World Radio History.
- Anon. (January 8, 2002). "Canada's Top 200 Albums of 2001". Jam!. Archived from the original on September 1, 2004.
- Anon. (January 8, 2002). "Canada's Top 200 R&B Albums of 2001". Jam!. Archived from the original on November 22, 2002.
- Anon. (October 11, 2003). "Canada's Top 200 R&B; albums of 2002". Jam!. Archived from the original on October 12, 2003.
- Anon. (2005). "100 Coolest Albums in the World". GQ (August). London.
- Anon. (November 17, 2007). "Artists beginning with A". The Guardian. London. Archived from the original on June 22, 2012.
- Anon. (2009). "Decade End Charts – Top R&B/Hip-Hop Albums". Billboard.
- Anon. (2020). "Albums turning 20 years old in 2021". Official Charts Company. Archived from the original on March 17, 2021.
- Anon. (July 17, 2021). "Happy 20th Anniversary to Aaliyah's Eponymous Third & Final Studio Album 'Aaliyah' Originally Released July 17, 2001". Albumism. Archived from the original on August 6, 2021.
- Anon. (2021). "Aaliyah – Aaliyah". Spotify. Archived from the original on September 10, 2021.
- Anon. (2021). "Official Album Downloads Chart Top 100". Official Charts Company.
- Anon. (2021). "Official Independent Albums Chart". Official Charts Company.
- Anon. (2021). "Official Hip Hop and R&B Albums Chart Top 40". Official Charts Company.
- Anon. (2021). "Billboard 200 Chart – Week of September 25, 2021". Billboard. Archived from the original on September 21, 2021.
- Anon. (2021). "Independent Albums Chart – Week of September 25, 2021". Billboard. Archived from the original on October 9, 2021.
- Anon. (2021). "Top R&B/Hip-Hop Albums Chart – Week of September 25, 2021". Billboard. Archived from the original on September 22, 2021.
- Anon.[a] (n.d.). "Aaliyah Reviews". Metacritic. Archived from the original on October 22, 2012.
- Anon.[b] (n.d.). "Aaliyah Chart History: Hot 100". Billboard. Archived from the original on October 8, 2021.
- Anon.[c] (n.d.). "2001-07-28 Top 40 Official UK Albums Archive". Official Charts Company. Archived from the original on February 20, 2018.
- Anon.[d] (n.d.). "Aaliyah". Official Charts Company. Archived from the original on October 19, 2021.
- Anon.[e] (n.d.). "Official R&B Albums Chart Top 40 – 27 January 2002 – 02 February 2002". Official Charts Company. Archived from the original on November 19, 2018.
- Anon.[f] (n.d.). "Aaliyah – Aaliyah". Ultratop (in Dutch). Hung Medien. Archived from the original on August 30, 2012.
- Anon.[g] (n.d.). "Aaliyah Chart History: Canadian Albums". Billboard. Archived from the original on October 8, 2021.
- Anon.[h] (n.d.). "Aaliyah Chart History: Top R&B/Hip-Hop Albums". Billboard. Archived from the original on October 16, 2021.
- Anon.[i] (n.d.). "Top 75 Artist Album, Week Ending 31 January 2002". Chart-Track. Archived from the original on February 19, 2014.
- Anon.[j] (n.d.). "アリーヤ" (in Japanese). Oricon. Archived from the original on March 6, 2014.
- Anon.[k] (n.d.). "Rapports Annuels 2001". ultratop.be (in French). Hung Medien. Archived from the original on November 13, 2013.
- Anon.[l] (n.d.). "Jaaroverzicht – Album 2001". dutchcharts.nl (in Dutch). Archived from the original on July 15, 2012.
- Anon.[m] (n.d.). "Classement Albums – année 2001" (in French). Syndicat National de l'Édition Phonographique. Archived from the original on September 25, 2012.
- Anon.[n] (n.d.). "Top 100 Album-Jahrescharts (2001)". Offizielle Deutsche Charts. Archived from the original on October 11, 2016.
- Anon.[o] (n.d.). "Swiss Year-End Charts 2001". swisscharts.com. Hung Medien. Archived from the original on July 29, 2013.
- Anon.[p] (n.d.). "ARIA Charts – Accreditations – 2003 Albums". aria.com.au. Australian Recording Industry Association. Archived from the original on November 3, 2012.
- Anon.[q] (n.d.). "Canadian album certifications – Aaliyah – Aaliyah". Music Canada. Archived from the original on February 28, 2014.
- Anon.[r] (n.d.). "French album certifications – Aaliyah – Aaliyah" (in French). Syndicat National de l'Édition Phonographique. Archived from the original on September 24, 2012.
- Anon.[s] (n.d.). "Gold-/Platin-Datenbank (Aaliyah; 'Aaliyah')". Bundesverband Musikindustrie (in German). Archived from the original on February 27, 2014.
- Anon.[t] (n.d.). "Japanese album certifications – Aaliyah – Aaliyah" (in Japanese). Recording Industry Association of Japan. Select 2001年月 on the drop-down menu. Archived from the original on September 24, 2019.
- Anon.[u] (n.d.). "Dutch album certifications – Aaliyah – Aaliyah" (in Dutch). Nederlandse Vereniging van Producenten en Importeurs van beeld- en geluidsdragers. Enter Aaliyah in the "Artiest of titel" box. Archived from the original on July 4, 2018.
- Anon.[v] (n.d.). "The Official Swiss Charts and Music Community: Awards (Aaliyah; 'Aaliyah')". Hung Medien. Archived from the original on March 2, 2014.
- Anon.[w] (n.d.). "British album certifications – Aaliyah – Aaliyah". British Phonographic Industry. Archived from the original on October 16, 2021.
- Anon.[x] (n.d.). "American album certifications – Aaliyah – Aaliyah". Recording Industry Association of America. If necessary, click Advanced, then click Format, then select Album, then click SEARCH. Archived from the original on June 4, 2020.
- Anon.[y] (March 4, 2002). "ARIA Urban Chart – Week Commencing 4th March 2002" (PDF). ARIA Charts. No. 627. p. 19. Archived (PDF) from the original on March 5, 2002.
- Anon.[aa] (n.d.). "Top 50 Global Best Selling Albums for 2001" (PDF). International Federation of the Phonographic Industry. Archived from the original (PDF) on November 17, 2008.
- Anon. (n.d.). "End of Year Album Chart Top 100 – 2002". Official Charts Company. Archived from the original on February 16, 2016.
- Anon. (n.d.). "Decade End Charts – Billboard 200 Albums". Billboard. Archived from the original on February 4, 2011.
- Anon. (n.d.). "More than a woman – Aaliyah – CD maxi single" (in French). France: Fnac.
- Anon. (n.d.). "Official Scottish Albums Chart Top 100: 27 January 2002 – 02 February 2002". Official Charts Company.
- Anon. (n.d.). "Official Hip Hop and R&B Albums Chart on 12/7/2024". Official Charts Company.
- "Official Independent Albums Chart". Official Charts Company. July 12, 2024.
- "Official Record Store Chart". Official Charts Company. July 12, 2024.
- Augustin, Camille (August 26, 2016). "Aaliyah Week: Remembering Aaliyah's Final Musical Journey". Vibe. Archived from the original on August 28, 2021.
- Ayers, Mike; Prince, David J.; Herrera, Monica (2009). "The Decade in Music: Top 50 Moments". Billboard. No. December 23. New York. Archived from the original on February 27, 2013.
- Baillie, Russell (2001). "Aaliyah: Aaliyah". The New Zealand Herald. No. August 8. Auckland. Archived from the original on December 11, 2015.
- Barlow, Eve (2011). "Column – Aaliyah still shaping pop music 10 years after her death". Q (August 25). London. Archived from the original on January 30, 2013.
- Beaumont-Thomas, Ben; Snapes, Laura; Curtin, April (September 13, 2019). "The 100 Best Albums of the 21st Century". The Guardian. Archived from the original on September 13, 2019.
- Bronson, Fred (August 23, 2003). "Chart Beat". Billboard. Archived from the original on August 6, 2021 – via Google Books.
- Brown, Ethan (December 2005). "The Score". Vibe. 12 (14). New York. Archived from the original on June 17, 2014 – via Google Books.
- Brown, Janelle (September 6, 2001). "Death of a pop princess in the making". Salon. Archived from the original on September 18, 2014.
- Bud'da; Rapture; J-Dub; Digital Black; Tim Barnett; Tank; Craig Kallman (July 17, 2011). "Exclusive: The Producers of "Aaliyah" Take Us Behind the Scenes Into Making of This Classic" (Interview). Interviewed by Thomas Leo; Kyle Ng. YouKnowIGotSoul. Archived from the original on November 23, 2012.
- Caramanica, Jon (March 2007). "Revolutions". Vibe. 15 (3). New York. Archived from the original on May 21, 2016 – via Google Books.
- Carroll, Jim (June 6, 2014). "Now Playing – the tunes of the week at OTR HQ". The Irish Times. Archived from the original on June 6, 2014.
- Cawn, Brad (August 19, 2001). "Aaliyah (Blackground/Virgin)". Chicago Tribune. No. August 19. Arts & Entertainment. Archived from the original on May 27, 2012.
- Chabras, Scott; et al. (2001). "Audio Files". St. Petersburg Times. No. August 19. Archived from the original on January 8, 2014.
- Christensen, Thor (January 5, 2002). "Newfound shine: Stars born, reborn as Grammy voters pick contenders". The Dallas Morning News. Archived from the original on January 9, 2014.
- Christgau, Robert (January 29, 2002). "Throw Your Hands in the Air". The Village Voice. New York. Archived from the original on October 21, 2012.
- Christgau, Robert (February 12, 2002). "Pazz & Jop 2001: Not Just Your Old Man's Takeover". The Village Voice. New York. Archived from the original on November 9, 2012.
- Christgau, Robert (September 30, 2007). "Consumer Guide Album: Aaliyah". robertchristgau.com. Archived from the original on September 30, 2007.
- Cinquemani, Sal (July 17, 2001). "Aaliyah: Aaliyah". Slant Magazine. Archived from the original on October 8, 2012.
- Cinquemani, Sal (October 15, 2001). "2001: Year in Music". Slant Magazine. Archived from the original on January 24, 2014.
- Clover, Joshua (August 2001). "Reviews". Spin. 17 (8). New York. Archived from the original on June 17, 2014 – via Google Books.
- Dansby, Andrew (2001). "Aaliyah Reaches No. 1". Rolling Stone. No. September 5. New York. Archived from the original on February 2, 2013.
- Dansby, Andrew (2001). "Jay-Z Number One Again". Rolling Stone. No. September 19. New York. Archived from the original on February 3, 2013.
- Easlea, Daryl (June 23, 2009). "Review of Aaliyah – Aaliyah". BBC Music. Archived from the original on March 22, 2012.
- Erlewine, Stephen Thomas (a) (n.d.). "Aaliyah – Aaliyah". AllMusic. Archived from the original on November 10, 2012.
- Erlewine, Stephen Thomas (b) (n.d.). "So Blu – Blu Cantrell". AllMusic. Archived from the original on April 24, 2013.
- Farley, Christopher John (2001). Aaliyah: More Than a Woman. Simon & Schuster. ISBN 0-7434-5566-5.
- France, Lisa Respers (August 5, 2021). "Aaliyah's estate releases statement over 'unauthorized projects'". CNN. Archived from the original on August 6, 2021.
- Frazer-Carroll, Micha (July 6, 2021). "'R&B was never the same': The life and legacy of Aaliyah". The Independent. Archived from the original on July 9, 2021.
- Goodwyn, Tom (August 6, 2012). "Drake Unveils New Aaliyah Duet 'Enough Said' – Listen". NME. Archived from the original on April 28, 2021.
- Gracie, Bianca (July 16, 2016). "Aaliyah's Producers Look Back at Her Self-Titled Final Album 15 Years Later". Fuse. Archived from the original on September 21, 2016.
- Hall, Rashaun (July 11, 2001). "Blackground Readying Aaliyah's Return". Billboard. Vol. 113, no. 29. New York. Archived from the original on January 5, 2014 – via Google Books.
- Hall, Rashaun (July 28, 2001). "Reviews & Previews". Billboard. Vol. 113, no. 30. New York. Archived from the original on June 4, 2020 – via Google Books.
- Hall, Rashaun (September 8, 2001). "Aaliyah's Death Shocks Industry: Singer Remembered As Rising R&B Star, Actress". Billboard. Vol. 113, no. 36. New York. Archived from the original on June 17, 2014 – via Google Books.
- Hardy, Ernest (August 2, 2001). "Recordings: Aaliyah, Aaliyah, 4 Stars". Rolling Stone. No. 874. New York. Archived from the original on June 6, 2002.
- Harris, Keith (2004). "Aaliyah". In Brackett, Nathan; Hoard, Christian (eds.). The New Rolling Stone Album Guide (4th ed.). Simon & Schuster. ISBN 0-7432-0169-8.
- Hartung, Justin (July 26, 2001). "Spin Cycle". Austin: Citysearch. Archived from the original on December 11, 2004.
- Higgins, Keenan (July 17, 2021). "20 Years Of 'Aaliyah': A Look at Baby Girl's 2001 Self-Titled Album & Its Decades-Spanning Influence". 92Q Jams. Archived from the original on September 10, 2021.
- Hobbs, Linda (December 2008). "One in a Million". Vibe. 16 (12). New York. Archived from the original on June 17, 2014 – via Google Books.
- Hopkins, Tracy E. (n.d.). "Aaliyah by Virgin Records Us, Aaliyah". Barnes & Noble. Archived from the original on January 15, 2014.
- Hubbard, Michael (April 29, 2002). "Aaliyah – Rock The Boat". MusicOMH. Archived from the original on January 8, 2014.
- Huff, Quentin B. (August 15, 2011). "My Favorite Aaliyah Things". PopMatters. Archived from the original on January 31, 2013.
- Huey, Steve (n.d.). "Aaliyah Biography, Songs, & Albums". AllMusic.
- James, Martin (July 20, 2001). "Review – Aaliyah". Playlouder. Archived from the original on July 28, 2001.
- Johnson, Connie (July 29, 2001). "A Coasting Aaliyah Steers Clear of Depth". Los Angeles Times. No. July 29. Calendar section. Archived from the original on October 26, 2012.
- Kameir, Rawija (July 14, 2019). "Aaliyah: Aaliyah Album Review". Pitchfork. Archived from the original on December 22, 2019.
- Kennedy, Gerrick D. (August 25, 2011). "Aaliyah: 10 years later, impact holds without posthumous releases". Pop & Hiss. Archived from the original on August 29, 2012.
- Kim, Hyun (August 2001). "What Lies Beneath?". Vibe. 9 (8). New York. Archived from the original on January 5, 2014 – via Google Books.
- Kim, Hyun (November 2001). "One in a Million". Vibe. 9 (11). New York. Archived from the original on June 17, 2014 – via Google Books.
- Larkin, Colin (2011). Encyclopedia of Popular Music. Omnibus Press. ISBN 978-0-85712-595-8.
- Legaspi, Althea (September 10, 2021). "Stream Aaliyah's Self-Titled Album". Rolling Stone. Archived from the original on September 10, 2021.
- Leroy, Dan (July 25, 2001). "Aaliyah Reviews". Yahoo! Music.
- Lorez, Jeff (2000). "Aaliyah: The M Factor". Blues & Soul (July 4–17). London.
- Lorez, Jeff (July 5, 2001). "Killer Queen". Yahoo! Music.
- Macpherson, Alex (2011). "Aaliyah's true legacy is her rare gift for nuance". The Guardian. No. August 25. London. Film & music section. Archived from the original on January 8, 2014.
- McManus, Luke (August 2, 2001). "Aaliyah – Aaliyah". RTÉ.
- Mayfield, Geoff (August 4, 2001). "Over the Counter". Billboard. Vol. 113, no. 31. New York. Archived from the original on January 5, 2014 – via Google Books.
- Mayfield, Geoff (September 8, 2001). "Over the Counter". Billboard. Vol. 113, no. 36. New York. Archived from the original on June 28, 2014 – via Google Books.
- Mayfield, Geoff (September 15, 2001). "Over the Counter". Billboard. Vol. 113, no. 37. New York. Archived from the original on June 28, 2014 – via Google Books.
- McIntyre, Hugh (August 5, 2021). "20 Years After Her Passing, Aaliyah's Music Is Finally Coming To Streaming Services". Forbes. Archived from the original on August 5, 2021.
- Mitchell, Gail (April 7, 2001). "MCA Takes on an Alluring Proposition; Aaliyah's New Album Now Set For June 5". Billboard. Vol. 113, no. 14. New York. Archived from the original on January 7, 2014 – via Google Books.
- Moon, Tom (2003). "Grammy Bag Grab in a year of multiple nominations, eight artists lead with five chances apiece for an award. This year's field of nominees also has more diversity than usual". The Philadelphia Inquirer. No. January 8. Archived from the original on January 9, 2014.
- Mulvey, John (July 14, 2001). "Aaliyah : Aaliyah". NME. London. Archived from the original on February 28, 2014.
- Needham, Alex (2001). "Who's That Girl?". NME (July 7). London.
- Newman, Melinda (January 20, 2001). "Aaliyah Has New Album, Movie Set For 2001". Billboard. Vol. 113, no. 3. Los Angeles.
- Nicholson, Rebecca (August 25, 2011). "Aaliyah: still rocking the boat". The Guardian. London. Archived from the original on January 8, 2014.
- Odell, Michael (July 12, 2001). "Pop CD releases". The Guardian. London. Friday Review section. Archived from the original on April 24, 2010.
- Orecklin, Michele (January 21, 2002). "People". Time. New York. Archived from the original on November 22, 2012.
- Pesselnick, Jill (August 26, 2000). "Virgin Records America Forms Deal to Distribute Blackground Globally". Billboard. Vol. 112, no. 35. Los Angeles. Archived from the original on January 5, 2014 – via Google Books.
- Petridis, Alexis (December 20, 2001). "2001 review: The year in rock and pop". The Guardian. London. Archived from the original on January 8, 2014.
- Petrosino, Frankie J. (2001). "Star Power Radiates at the 33rd Image Awards". The Crisis. 109–3 (May–June). Baltimore. Archived from the original on June 17, 2014 – via Google Books.
- Price, Simon (2001). "Review: Aaliyah". The Independent. No. August 19. London.
- Rabin, Nathan (July 17, 2001). "Aaliyah: Aaliyah". The A.V. Club. Chicago. Archived from the original on September 1, 2012.
- Reid, Shaheem (June 26, 2001). "Aaliyah Makes Love And War On New Album". MTV News. Archived from the original on April 19, 2012.
- Reid, Shaheem (August 27, 2001). "Hard-Working Aaliyah Packed Hit Albums, Movies into Short Life". MTV News. Archived from the original on November 12, 2012.
- Reid, Shaheem (February 25, 2002). "Aaliyah, Six Months Later: #1 At Box Office With LP In Works". MTV News. Archived from the original on March 2, 2014.
- Robinson, John (April 23, 2002). "Aaliyah : Rock The Boat". NME. London. Archived from the original on May 25, 2013.
- Sanneh, Kelefa (September 2, 2001). "A Pioneer, Briefly, Of a New Sound". The New York Times. No. September 2. Archived from the original on November 8, 2012.
- Schumacher-Rasmussen, Eric (August 30, 2001). "Aaliyah's Final Video 'Very Special,' Director Says". MTV News. Archived from the original on March 2, 2014.
- Seymour, Craig (July 27, 2001). "Aaliyah Review". Entertainment Weekly. No. 606. New York. Archived from the original on September 25, 2012.
- Seymour, Craig (January 1, 2002). "Deals at work for Aaliyah's music to live". Chicago Tribune. Archived from the original on March 1, 2014.
- Sigesmund, B. J.; Evans, Tavia (August 28, 2001). "What Now?". Newsweek. New York. Archived from the original on March 4, 2014.
- Piatkowski, Peter (July 21, 2022). "'Aaliyah': The Legacy of the Perfect R&B/Pop Record". PopMatters.
- Staff (January 18, 2005). "The Top 50 Albums: 2000–2005". Stylus Magazine. Archived from the original on September 30, 2012.
- Staff (February 1, 2010). "Best of the Aughts: Albums". Slant Magazine. Archived from the original on October 22, 2012.
- Strong, Martin C. (2009). "Aaliyah". The Great Rock Discography (7th ed.). Canongate. ISBN 978-1841956152.
- Turner-Williams, Jaelani (July 16, 2021). "Aaliyah's Self-Titled Album Turns 20: Revisiting Her Career's Untimely Finale". Stereogum.
- Irons, Stasia (July 24, 2017). "The 150 Greatest Albums Made By Women". NPR.
- Wade, Ian (July 17, 2001). "Album Review". Dotmusic. Archived from the original on October 31, 2003.
- Waliszewski, Bob (n.d.). "Aaliyah". Plugged In. Archived from the original on July 20, 2013.
- Werner, Craig Hansen (2006). A Change Is Gonna Come: Music, Race & the Soul of America. University of Michigan Press. ISBN 0-472-03147-3. Archived from the original on June 11, 2020.
- Yago, Gideon (March 14, 2001). "Aaliyah Finishes New Album During Break From Movies". MTV News. Archived from the original on October 16, 2021.
- Yago, Gideon; Johnson, Tina; van Horn, Teri (March 15, 2001). "Aaliyah Finishes New Album During Break From Movies". MTV News. Archived from the original on November 6, 2012.
