= We Need a Resolution =

2001 single by Aaliyah

- North American editions cover

Single by Aaliyah featuring Timbaland

from the album Aaliyah
- B-side: "Messed Up"; "Are You Feelin' Me?"
- Released: May 15, 2001
- Studio: Westlake (Los Angeles)
- Genre: Alternative R&B; hip hop; electro-funk
- Length: 4:02
- Label: Blackground; Virgin
- Songwriters: Timothy Mosley; Stephen Garrett
- Producer: Timbaland

Aaliyah singles chronology
"Come Back in One Piece" (2000)	"We Need a Resolution" (2001)	"Rock the Boat" (2001)

Timbaland singles chronology
"Can't Nobody" (1999)	"We Need a Resolution" (2001)	"Ugly" (2001)

Music video
- "We Need a Resolution" on YouTube

Alternative cover
- International editions cover

"We Need a Resolution" is a song recorded by American singer Aaliyah, featuring a guest appearance by American producer–rapper Timbaland for her eponymous third and final studio album (2001). Written by Static Major and Timbaland, with the latter producing it, it was released as the album's lead single by Blackground Records and Virgin Records on May 15, 2001. Musically, it is a "bouncing" alternative R&B, hip hop, and electro-funk song with Middle Eastern influences. Lyrically, "We Need a Resolution" speaks about a passive-aggressive relationship that has hit a rough patch in which the narrator (Aaliyah) asks for solutions while her partner dismisses her feelings.

Upon its release, the song received generally positive reviews from most music critics, who praised Aaliyah's vocals, the lyrical content, and the production. A moderate commercial success, it peaked at number 59 on the US Billboard Hot 100 chart. Internationally, it reached the top 40 in Canada, the Netherlands, the United Kingdom, and Wallonia.

An accompanying music video for "We Need a Resolution" was directed by Paul Hunter. Its initial plot involves providing viewers with an "exclusive peek" into Aaliyah's life. The video's underlying theme also utilizes snakes. Certain scenes show her lying in a snake pit with Pythons crawling over her body. Throughout the years, the video earned praise for its dark tone. Many critics have noted how Aaliyah has come into her womanhood in the video.

== Background ==
During the recording of her third studio album, Aaliyah was also filming her second film Queen of the Damned in Australia. Due to her hectic schedule at the time, she decided to record the album simultaneously with the filming, thus her team of producers–excluding Timbaland–traveled to Australia. Due to unforeseen issues with Blackground Records, Timbaland was not expected to appear on the album at all. According to Tim Barnett, former assistant to songwriter Static Major, they "went back to New York and did them in either Sound King or Manhattan studio. We did them right after the New Year. Part of the problem was Timbaland and Missy weren't even going to be on the album because of problems with Blackground. Aaliyah talked Tim into producing records for the album, so Timbaland did it out of love for Babygirl." Once Aaliyah reached out to Timbaland and asked him to produce songs for the album, there were constant doubts about him meeting his deadline in time due to the last-minute request. According to producer Rapture Stewart, Timbaland came on board during the last week of the album's production.

"We Need a Resolution" was not originally considered for the lead single from Aaliyah. Due to the uncertainty with Timbaland being able to meet his deadline, the song "Loose Rap" was chosen as the album's lead single, with filming of its accompanying music video already scheduled. However, as Timbaland managed to submit his contributions in time, Blackground Records decided that "We Need a Resolution" would be the lead single instead.

== Music and lyrics ==
A "bouncing" alternative R&B, hip hop and electro-funk song, "We Need a Resolution" is described as having a club beat. It features a "disorienting arrangement" sampled from the composition "Tricks of the Trade" by John Ottman, from the Incognito score (1997). Peter Piatkowski from PopMatters says, it's a "mini-suite, cramming sounds of electrofunk, pop, and soul". It also has a "seductive Middle Eastern vibe", as the backing track "slithers along with an almost Egyptian feel". On the song, Timbaland combines "idiosyncratic beats, moody, off-key melodies and an insistent, dirgelike chorus for a strangely hypnotic effect". The production, has a sparse arrangement with stop-start drum patterns, hand claps, while also implementing "Horror-movie organs". Vocally, Aaliyah displays, "quivering vocals", that "unnervingly evoke the feelings of fear and desperation that often precede a breakup". BET described her vocals on the song as "Slinky" and "Understated".

Lyrically, "We Need a Resolution" maturely presents two perspectives in a passive-aggressive relationship. "Aaliyah is bitter about her boyfriend's actions, but sly enough to hide her personal disgust so that her complaints have a universal feel". According to Natelegé Whaley from Mic, the song opens with warpy clarinet samples, as Timbaland avoids confrontation by repeatedly saying "I'm tired of arguing girl." Aaliyah's first line in the song cuts to the chase, responding in a relaxed yet direct manner: "Did you sleep on the wrong side? / I'm catching a bad vibe." Aaliyah's sinuously sung concerns are playfully dismissed in Timbaland's featured rap. The song leaves its hook unresolved, plays backwards after Timbaland's rap, and concludes with a reversed loop of the vocal "where were you last night", which echoes the female protagonist's sentiment.

In an interview with MTV, Aaliyah was asked if the song spoke about a specific person or situation, and she stated: "Not personally, no. This song just speaks about relationships and things that happen in life. This particular song doesn't touch on anything that happened to me in my life, it just speaks about a relationship that has gone a little sour and the lady's asking for a resolution. [She's saying] We need to talk, we need to solve this."

== Release and artwork ==
"We Need a Resolution" was serviced to rhythmic contemporary and urban contemporary radio stations in the United States on May 15, 2001, and was released on physical formats internationally in July. In an interview with Billboard, Aaliyah spoke on the decision to make "We Need a Resolution" the lead single saying, "I wanted that to be the first single because I felt it was a good way to come back out after Try Again". Though, "Try Again" was a very upbeat song she felt that this record provided a certain balance. According to her, "While this isn't a ballad, 'We Need a Resolution' wasn't an upbeat song either. It's midtempo—very sexy and very smooth—yet I felt that all radio formats could get into it because you can still dance to it."

In August 2021, it was reported that Aaliyah's recorded work for Blackground (since rebranded as Blackground Records 2.0) would be re-released on physical, digital, and, for the first time ever, streaming services in a deal between the label and Empire Distribution. Aaliyah, including "We Need a Resolution", was re-released on September 10.

The cover artwork for North American editions of the single was photographed by David LaChapelle and it featured a heavily stylized image , while international pressings featured a still from the anime-styled commercial produced to promote Aaliyah, illustrated by Warren Fu, which itself featured "We Need a Resolution" as its soundtrack; the illustration was simultaneously used as the special edition cover for Aaliyah.

== Critical reception ==
Daryl Easlea from BBC stated: "Opener We Need A Resolution – a duet with Timbaland – demonstrates her strength. She was not a teenager anymore and the almost gothic setting over skeletal beats underlines this new maturity". Chuck Taylor from Billboard gave "We Need a Resolution" a mixed review. Although he praised Aaliyah's vocal delivery by saying: "Aaliyah's light but direct delivery complements the hectic track well" and said the song was classic Aaliyah, he expressed his hopes that she would show more growth and variety just as well as she was building her acting resume. In a review of Aaliyah, Michael Paoletta from Billboard described the song as being "wickedly hypnotic". Damien Scott from Complex felt that the song was one of the strongest from Aaliyah and that it showed her being more grown and confident. He also felt that the song was both one of Aaliyah's best vocal performances and Timbaland's best guest rap verses. Chris Heath from Dotmusic praised the song by saying "it's what's going on beneath the chorus and verse that makes We Need A Resolution such an alluring proposition". He also felt that Aaliyah "produced another classy slice of experimental R&B".

Connie Johnson from the Los Angeles Times felt that "We Need a Resolution", along with "Rock the Boat", was a standout song from Aaliyah. Music Week felt that the song was a strong follow up to "Try Again" (2000) and that its "beat-laden Timbaland-produced sound certainly oozes crossover potential". Alex Needham from NME compared the songs production to Jay-Z's Big Pimpin' (2000) and felt that though it lacks a "bassline, like 'Get Ur Freak On', this creates a universe of drama, suspicion and pain out of almost nothing. In other words, it's magic". In a review of Aaliyah, Luke McManus from the Irish publication RTÉ felt that it "is a highlight – a heartfelt tale of domestic stress over backward loops, deranged arpeggios and a rare Timbaland appearance on the microphone". Teen People included the song in their "Hottest Song of 2001" sweepstakes. Rich Bellis from The Atlantic praised Aaliyah's vocals on the song, describing them as going "from staccato to snake-charmer and a beat that hopscotches all over the place". Alexis Petridis from The Guardian felt that, compared to other records played on mainstream radio, the song sounded "like an unhinged experiment in sound, one that just happened to have an insistent, catchy chorus attached". George Lang from The Oklahoman praised Aaliyah's vocals on the song saying, "On her most recent single, "We Need a Resolution," Aaliyah's vocal delivery on the status of a relationship was as serious and expressive as they come".

In a retrospective review, Billboard, compared the song to Ja Rule and Jennifer Lopez duets and felt the song "wasn't the greatest choice of lead a single from Aaliyah", due to its complex subject matter. Overall, the publication thought the song remained "one of the set's most rewarding numbers" and praised both Aaliyah's vocals and the songs production. In a retrospective review of Aaliyah's self-titled album Peter Piatkowski from PopMatters felt that "We Need a Resolution" "harkened to the future of Black pop music in which hip-hop, pop, synth-pop, and soul would be pulled together into a brilliant, shiny sound". Variety praised the song and Aaliyah's vocals saying, "She sings perfectly in sync with Timbaland's beatboxes and violin strings throughout".

== Accolades ==
Rankings for "We Need a Resolution"
Year	Publication	Accolade	Rank	Ref.
2001	MTV	Top 53 of 2001	36	
2001	Slant Magazine	2001: Year in Music (Singles)	8	
2001	Slant Magazine	2001: Year in Music (Music Videos)	6	
2001	Spin	Singles of The Year	8	
2006	Stylus Magazine	The Top 50 Singles: 2000–2005	30	
2010	Slant Magazine	The 100 Best Singles of the Aughts	21	
2011	AllMusic	Andy Kellman's 100 Favorite Charting R&B Singles of 2000–2009	88	
2011	NME	150 Best Tracks of the Past 15 Years	119	
2011	NME	Tracks of the Year (2001)	38	
2019	Liveabout.com	The 100 Best Pop Songs of 2001	67	
2021	Spin	The 50 Best Songs of 2001	18	

== Commercial performance ==
In the United States, "We Need a Resolution" was a moderate success, debuting at number 78 on the Billboard Hot 100 on June 2, 2001. It reached its peak at number 59 five weeks later, on June 30. The song made its final appearance on the chart dated August 25, at number 95. On the Hot R&B/Hip-Hop Singles & Tracks chart, the song peaked at number 15 on June 30. It also peaked within the top 40 on the Rhythmic Top 40, at number 31. In Canada, the song peaked at number 26. After the parent album's rerelease in 2021, "We Need A Resolution" peaked at number 9 on the US R&B Digital Song Sales chart.

In the United Kingdom, "We Need a Resolution" peaked at number 20 on the UK Singles Chart on July 21. On the UK Dance Chart, it debuted at number 14 on July 14 and peaked at number six the following week. The song also peaked at number six on the UK R&B Chart. According to the Official Charts Company (OCC), "We Need a Resolution" is Aaliyah's eighth best-selling single in the UK. In Belgium, the song peaked at number 28 in Wallonia on September 29. In the Netherlands, the song peaked at number two on the Tipparade chart on August 18, and at number 37 on the Single Top 100 on August 4.

== Music video ==
=== Background ===
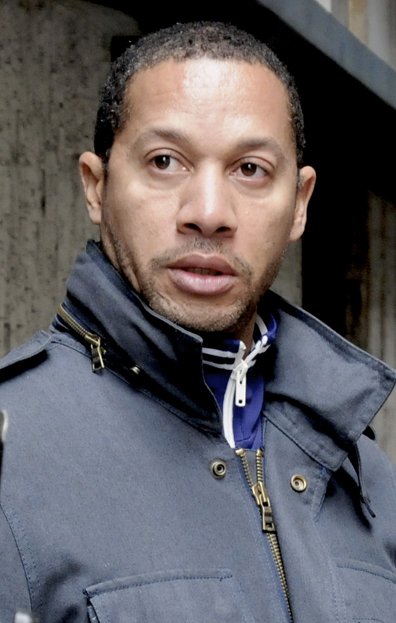
"We Need a Resolution" was the third music video that Paul Hunter directed for Aaliyah.

The accompanying music video for "We Need a Resolution" was directed by Paul Hunter in Los Angeles in April 2001. The video's choreography was orchestrated by Fatima Robinson. Hunter had previously worked with Aaliyah in 1996 on her music videos for "Got to Give It Up" and "One in a Million". After directing the latter, Hunter wanted to work with Aaliyah again on other projects, but that never came into fruition due to scheduling conflicts. According to Hunter, they "had a pretty good connection to other projects and both went our different ways. I wanted to work with her on a couple of projects after that but she wanted to go in another direction". After years of running into each other, Aaliyah reached out to Hunter while recording Aaliyah and expressed that she wanted to work with him again. Hunter explained: "She'd gone her direction, I'd gone my direction and then over time we started to see each other around and as she was making the record, she called me and said, 'Hey, I want to connect back with you on this project, try to recreate the magic that we did on "One in a Million"."

=== Theme ===
Hunter explained the video's theme: "One of the things that she wanted to do, she wanted to obviously dance, and she was really great at it. I felt that the idea behind that connection, we wanted an exclusive peek into her life, so the idea there was to create a sense that every room, every scenario that you're looking at something that only certain people can see". He added: "It's almost like if you've ever seen a celebrity in the airport, they're going into a first class lounge, or they're going into a private hallway, they sort of slip past you". Multiple snakes were used for the video, with Hunter saying: "I think that idea was about danger. I don't know if it was her idea or my idea, but ultimately it was about her being in control of something that was dangerous or that would create some sort of tension in the story and that ultimately she was in control of it…Aaliyah always wanted something that was different from what was going on".

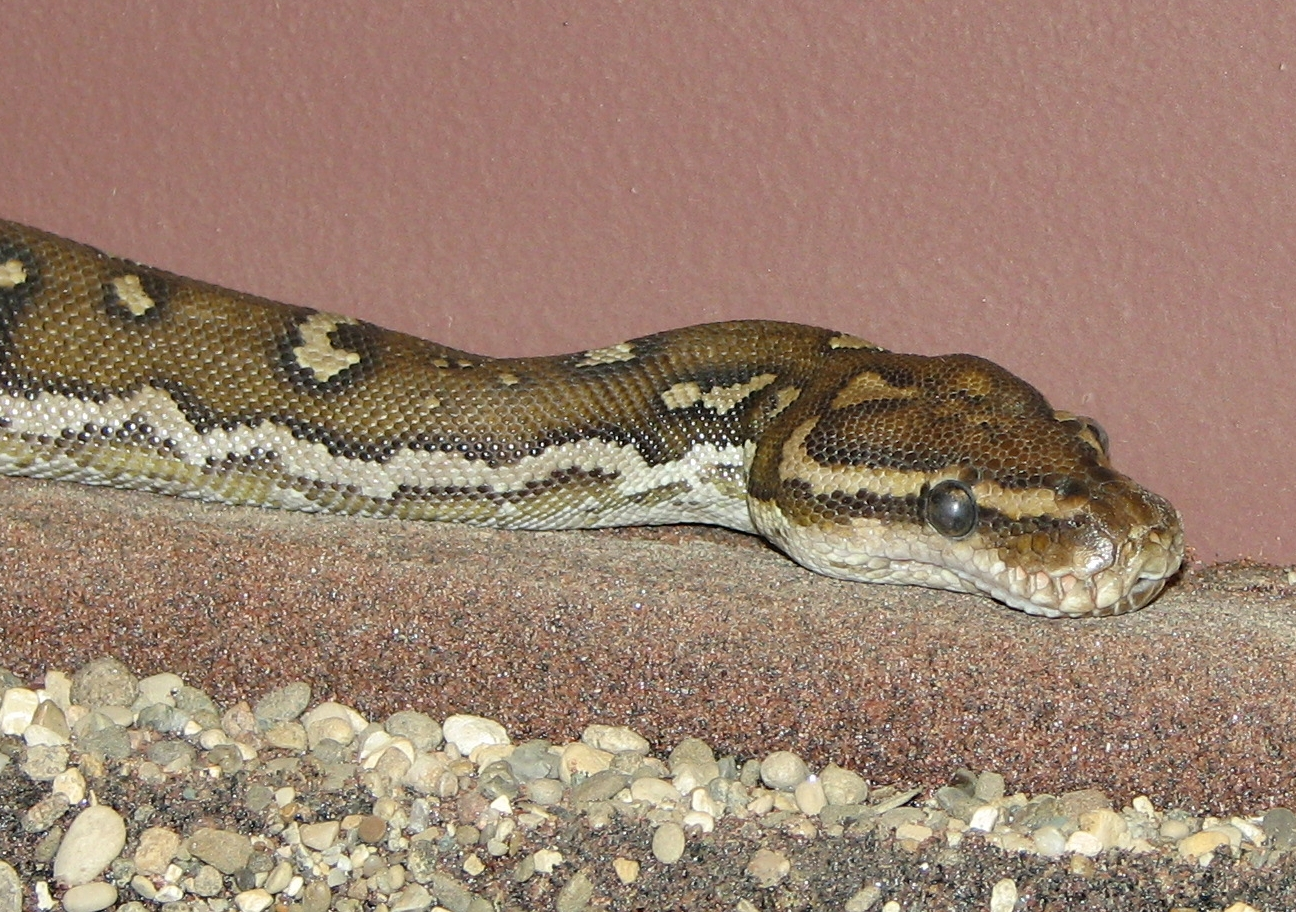
The video's theme involved snakes and multiple pythons were used.

Prior to shooting the video, Aaliyah worked with five pythons during a photo shoot for her eponymous album in Australia. Initially, she was nervous handling them but over time she "fell in love and felt an affinity toward them". She loved that they were "mysterious creatures" and compared her personality to them. According to her, "They live in solitude, [and] there are times in my life [when] I just want to be by myself. There are times I can't even figure myself out. I feel they are very complex creatures, [but] at the same time, they're sexy, too. That's why they represent Aaliyah pretty well. They're dangerous, but quite beautiful." Ultimately, she thought that snakes could represent her on the album and wanted to use them "probably throughout the whole project", including in videos. During an interview with People, she discussed her experience working with snakes for the video saying: "I saw bags moving in the corner, and I found out they were real snakes. I was a little nervous, but I kinda like doing crazy stuff." A total of 50 snakes were used for "We Need a Resolution", including ten pythons. According to her, "I thought it was cool, so dangerous and so risky, I loved it!".

=== Fashion ===
Throughout most of the music video for "We Need a Resolution", Aaliyah is shown wearing a black gown designed by Roberto Cavalli.

In the video, Aaliyah wore various outfits, including a black gown by Italian designer Roberto Cavalli. According to her stylist Derek Lee, Aaliyah wore the gown backwards because "It was covering too much of the front, but it had a lot of skin out in the back, so we flipped it". Lee further said: "Usually I would get an ok from Cavalli to do it, but we didn't have time, so I just kind of did it anyway they liked it, thank God". To uphold the snake theme for the video, Aaliyah was shown wearing Gianfranco Ferré's spring 2001 fringe reptile tube dress in one of the video's scenes. Just like the Cavalli dress, Ferré's dress was worn differently as well. Lee stated: "that wasn't worn right [either]. The bottom looked like a skirt but it was actually supposed to be a dress. So we used it as a skirt and then I custom-made a snakeskin top to go with it." In another scene, Aaliyah is shown wearing a blue outfit that was custom made by designer Linda Stokes, who designed clothes for the group TLC. Lee wanted the outfit to be futuristic: "I came with some fabric and was like, I want this made for like a futuristic kind of a thing. And, boom, she made it for me. And I customized the jeans in the dance scene".

=== Synopsis ===
"In one scene, Aaliyah is inexplicably smeared with mud. It's clearly the work of an artist who is comfortable with her image and confident that she can look good and appear desirable no matter what's she wearing".

— Christopher John Farley, Aaliyah: More Than a Woman

The video begins "with a crisp, cool shoot of Aaliyah sitting down, giving the camera a confident, sultry look". She is wearing a black dress, seated in front of a black background, as her "black hair is blowing slightly in a breeze". The following scene begins to slightly speed the pace up, with Aaliyah traveling in a futuristic subway tube. Aaliyah is then shown in a meditation chamber, wearing headphones and levitating above the floor in a prone position. During the second verse and the next chorus, she appears inside a snake pit with snakes crawling over her body. As Timbaland's rap verse begins, he can be seen in a dark room wearing shades. Aaliyah's dance sequence is interspersed with Timbaland's scenes, and the video subsequently ends with all aforementioned scenes displayed interchangeably.

=== Release and reception ===
The music video for "We Need a Resolution" made its television debut on BET during the week of April 22, 2001. The following week, the video made its debut on MTV. On April 26, Aaliyah appeared on both BET's 106 & Park and MTV's Total Request Live to promote the video. During the week of May 13, the video was the tenth most-played on MTV. The following week, it was the fifth most-played video on BET. In Canada, the video premiered on MuchMusic on June 16. In the United Kingdom, it was made available for streaming via NME's website ahead of its UK single release, with the publication describing it as a "stylistic revamp" of Aaliyah's artistry. They further analyzed: "Just as in various cultures, snakes have been symbols of wisdom, sex or evil, it's a strange and ambiguous image. Is Aaliyah in danger, or witchily commanding the darker forces of nature?".

In his biography Aaliyah: More Than a Woman (2001), Christopher John Farley described "We Need a Resolution" as "one of Aaliyah's strangest videos and one of the weirder videos made by an R&B singer in recent years". He further elaborated that "it stands out because it doesn't explain; it intrigues because it doesn't offer standard come-on's, and it's beautiful to look at because it's not afraid to be a bit dirty". Author Ytasha L. Womack argued in her book Afrofuturism: The World of Black Sci-Fi and Fantasy Culture (2013), that Aaliyah's "slithering snake adornments" from the video is an archetypical reference to ancient Egyptian goddess Isis and water spirit Mami Wata. Jeff Lorenz from Yahoo! Music described the video as "darkly exotic". Sal Cinquemani from Slant Magazine praised the video for its sultry imagery and felt that it "marked the singer's transition from semi-awkward adolescence to full-fledged, unapologetic womanhood".

Kathy Iandoli from Noisey Vice mentioned that in the video, Aaliyah "adopted this sexy yet spacey motif", adding: "From see-through lace to gothic make up, and back around to one-dot lipstick application and free-flowing curls, "We Need A Resolution" captured every angle of Aaliyah's existence at the time". Steffanee Wang from Nylon compared Aaliyah's "snake moment" in the video to Britney Spears' performance at the 2001 MTV Video Music Awards, ultimately deeming both to be "top moments in reptilian pop culture history". Cosmopolitan included the video on its list "The 65 Sexiest Music Videos of All Time", writing: "Aaliyah gives an unforgettable "pop star with snake" performance in [the video]. It's dangerous and hot all at the same time".

== Track listings and formats ==
US 12-inch vinyl

1. "We Need a Resolution" (album version) – 4:02
2. "We Need a Resolution" (instrumental) – 4:02
3. "We Need a Resolution" (no rap) – 3:54
4. "We Need a Resolution" (a cappella) – 4:03

Australian and European maxi CD and UK cassette single

1. "We Need a Resolution" (album version) – 4:02
2. "Messed Up" – 3:33
3. "Are You Feelin' Me?" – 3:09
4. "We Need a Resolution" (music video) – 3:59

European CD single

1. "We Need a Resolution" (album version) – 4:02
2. "Messed Up" – 3:33

European 12-inch vinyl

1. "We Need a Resolution" (album version) – 4:02
2. "We Need a Resolution" (instrumental) – 4:02
3. "Messed Up" – 3:33

French maxi CD single

1. "We Need a Resolution" (album version) – 4:02
2. "Messed Up" – 3:33
3. "We Need a Resolution" (music video) – 3:59

== Credits and personnel ==
Credits are adapted from the liner notes of Aaliyah.

- Aaliyah – vocals
- Jimmy Douglass – engineering, mixing
- Static Major – writing
- Timbaland – mixing, production, vocals, writing

== Charts ==
=== Weekly charts ===
Chart (2001)	Peak position
Australia (ARIA)	44
Australian Urban (ARIA)	11
Belgium (Ultratop 50 Flanders)	47
Belgium (Ultratop 50 Wallonia)	28
Canada (Nielsen SoundScan)	26
Europe (European Hot 100 Singles)	42
France (SNEP)	53
Germany (GfK)	66
Netherlands (Dutch Top 40 Tipparade)	2
Netherlands (Single Top 100)	37
Scottish Singles Sales (Official Charts)	44
Sweden (Sverigetopplistan)	46
Switzerland (Schweizer Hitparade)	56
UK Singles (Official Charts)	20
UK Dance (Official Charts)	10
UK Hip Hop/R&B (Official Charts)	6
US Billboard Hot 100	59
US Hot R&B/Hip-Hop Songs (Billboard)	15
US Rhythmic Airplay (Billboard)	38
US CHR/Rhythmic (Radio & Records)	25
US Urban (Radio & Records)	8

Chart (2021)	Peak position
US R&B Digital Song Sales	9

=== Year-end charts ===
Chart (2001)	Position
US Hot R&B/Hip-Hop Singles & Tracks (Billboard)	68
US CHR/Rhythmic (Radio & Records)	95
US Urban (Radio & Records)	43

== Release history ==
Release dates and formats for "We Need a Resolution"
Region	Date	Format(s)	Label(s)	Ref.
United States	April 13, 2001	—	Blackground; Virgin	
United States	May 15, 2001	Rhythmic contemporary radio; urban contemporary radio	Blackground; Virgin	
United States	May 22, 2001	12-inch vinyl	Blackground; Virgin	
United States	June 12, 2001	Contemporary hit radio	Blackground; Virgin	
France	July 3, 2001	CD; maxi CD	Hostile	
Germany	July 9, 2001	Maxi CD	EMI	
United Kingdom	July 9, 2001	12-inch vinyl; cassette; maxi CD	Virgin	
Australia	July 30, 2001	Maxi CD	EMI	
Germany	August 14, 2001	12-inch vinyl	EMI	
