= Rock the Boat (Aaliyah song) =

2001 single by Aaliyah

Single by Aaliyah

from the album Aaliyah
- B-side: "We Need a Resolution"
- Written: 1999
- Released: August 21, 2001
- Recorded: 1999
- Studio: Sony (New York)
- Genre: R&B
- Length: 4:35
- Label: Blackground; Virgin
- Composers: Eric Seats; Rapture Stewart
- Lyricist: Stephen Garrett
- Producers: Eric Seats; Rapture

Aaliyah singles chronology
"We Need a Resolution" (2001)	"Rock the Boat" (2001)	"More Than a Woman" (2001)

Music video
- "Rock the Boat" on YouTube

"Rock the Boat" is a song recorded by American singer Aaliyah for her eponymous third and final studio album (2001). It was written by Static Major, and composed and produced by Eric Seats and Rapture Stewart. Initially, "More Than a Woman" was expected to be the album's second single; however, "Rock the Boat" garnered heavy radio airplay prematurely, which prompted Blackground Records to make that song the second single instead. On August 21, 2001, it was officially serviced to rhythmic contemporary radio by Blackground Records and Virgin Records.

Musically, it is a Caribbean-flavored mid-tempo R&B song with funk influences. Lyrically, it focuses on the female narrator (Aaliyah) instructing her lover on how to please her sexually. Upon its release, "Rock the Boat" received generally favorable reviews from music critics, with many praising Aaliyah's vocals, the song's lyricism, and overall production. In 2002, the song received a nomination for Best Female R&B Vocal Performance at the 44th Annual Grammy Awards. A commercial success in the United States, it peaked at number 14 on the Billboard Hot 100. Internationally, it achieved similar success, reaching the top 20 in the Netherlands and the United Kingdom.

An accompanying music video for "Rock the Boat" was directed by Hype Williams and was filmed in Miami and the Bahamas. It is a dance–heavy tropical–themed video that features Aaliyah dancing on the beach and a yacht. Following its completion, Aaliyah and eight others died in a plane crash on August 25, 2001. Due to Aaliyah's death, there was uncertainty about the video's release. Eventually, it made its television debut on BET's Access Granted on October 9. In 2002, the video received critical acclaim from the critics and the music industry, earning nominations for Best R&B Video at the 2002 MTV Video Music Awards and Outstanding Music Video at the NAACP Image Awards.

== Writing and recording ==
Static Major wrote the lyrics for "Rock the Boat", while Eric Seats and Rapture Stewart of the production duo Keybeats composed and produced it, as early as 1999. Dissatisfied with the instrumental track he produced, Seats almost deleted it in order to "start something over fresh". However, Static Major heard the track and quickly wrote the hook for what would become "Rock the Boat". Intending to enhance the track, Seats employed Dave Foreman's guitar and Stewart's strings into the production.

Due to the sexually themed lyricism of "Rock the Boat", Aaliyah's management was initially reluctant to allow her to record the song. However, they relented as, according to Aaliyah's uncle and manager Barry Hankerson, Major "did things where you never felt offended. You just felt like you overheard someone thinking... he was clever". Aaliyah recorded the song at the Sony Music Studios in New York City. It was one of the first tracks recorded for Aaliyah, and one of the two tracks recorded during the initial recording sessions—before Aaliyah began filming Romeo Must Die (2000) and recording its accompanying soundtrack—which would make the final track listing of Aaliyah.

== Music and lyrics ==
"Rock the Boat"
A 28-second sample of the chorus, with Aaliyah's high-octane sexual requests.

"Rock the Boat" was described as being a Caribbean-flavored sensual and smooth mid-tempo R&B song, that features 1970s funk influences. Meanwhile, Jeff Lorez from Yahoo! Music states that it has a retro jazziness feel. According to Musicnotes, it is composed in the key of G minor and is set in time signature of common time with a tempo of 92 beats per minute, while Aaliyah's vocal range spans from F♯_{3} to C♯_{5}. Production wise it features an atmospheric groove, hypnotic rhythms, and fluctuating instrumentation, such as synthesizer effects. Michael Odell from The Guardian felt that "Rock the Boat" pays tribute to synth-driven 1980s soul.

Odell also said, "Aaliyah's tentative vocal finds its way around a menu of high-octane sexual requests". She, "breathlessly purrs sexual commands over an airy groove whose instrumentation swells against and then falls away from her voice". On the song Aaliyah is "reveling in her sexual freedom for the first time on record". Lyrically, its female narrator instructs a lover on how to please her sexually and equates her erotic high to a drug high. According to producer Bud'da, Aaliyah debated about the song including the line "I feel like I'm on dope" because she didn't want to send a wrong message to her fans. Natelegé Whaley of Mic opined that "she is captain of her physical needs in the bedroom and confidently directs the voyage. She knew what she wanted and knew how to get it." In the book Diva: Feminism and Fierceness from Pop to Hip-Hop (2023), author Kirsty Fairclough said of the lyrics, "One could argue, in the context of third wave feminism, that the song articulates a pro-sex, counter-patriarchal reversal of gendered norms – in that it is now the female who instructs, and instructs for herself alone (in that litany of 'me's):' you make me float', 'you get me high', 'you serve me', 'change positions for me', 'stroke it for me' and so on". Fairclough even noted that the male presence is merely demoted to " 'boy', 'baby', 'babe'" and that their presence "is almost entirely absent, or reduced to a biological anonymity".

== Release ==
Having invested in the commercial performance of Aaliyah, Blackground Records and Virgin Records wanted a single with a high chart peak to help increase the album's sales. Its lead single "We Need a Resolution" (featuring Timbaland) had been released on April 13, 2001, but underperformed on radio and reached only number 59 on the US Billboard Hot 100.

Originally, "More Than a Woman" was chosen as the second single from Aaliyah. However, "Rock the Boat" began receiving airplay prior to its official release as a single. Aaliyah fought with the label and pushed for "Rock the Boat" to become the second single; producer Eric Seats recalled hearing her say: "No, it's this one. I don't care who did what. This one is the next one." Consequently, Blackground and Virgin serviced "Rock the Boat" to rhythmic contemporary radio in the United States as the second single from Aaliyah on August 21, 2001. In Australia, it was released as the third and final single on November 26. The single was released in mainland Europe in April 2002 and the UK in May 2002.

In August 2021, it was reported that Aaliyah's recorded work for Blackground (since rebranded as Blackground Records 2.0) would be re-released on physical, digital, and, for the first time ever, streaming services in a deal between the label and Empire Distribution. Aaliyah, including "Rock the Boat", was re-released on September 10.

== Critical reception ==
Khal from Complex described the accompanying music video for "Rock the Boat" as "a thing of beauty, with tropical visuals properly matching the laid back vibe of the instrumental. Perfect percussive accents dwell around the chilled melodies." James Poletti from dotmusic felt that Aaliyah's "breathy vocals become stutteringly suggestive as the track squelches and pops its way to a rather lovely place." Connie Johnson from the Los Angeles Times described "Rock the Boat" as being "sexily assertive"; she also felt that the song, along with "We Need a Resolution", was a standout song on the album. Music Week felt that although the song "may not be as immediate as More Than a Woman", it "serves to remind us of the wealth of talent that has been lost".

Michael Hubbard from MusicOMH gave the song a mixed review, although he felt this song wasn't "the best record she's done", he praised her vocals, saying "Aaliyah shows again that one needn't screech a la Miss Mariah Carey in order to achieve pleasing results". John Robinson from NME panned the song calling it "one of the less memorable tracks from her album". He also thought it was "Overproduced to the point where the song skids past you on a trail of its own slickness". Ernest Hardy from Rolling Stone, said "Rock the Boat" was the highlight of the album, and felt that the song showed Aaliyah coming "into her own as a woman". Overall, Hardy declared, "She's at the wheel, steering her sexuality and using it to explore her own fantasies and strengths. And the joy you hear in her voice, in the grooves, is rooted in independence. R&B's reigning ice princess is starting to thaw."

Russell Baillie from The New Zealand Herald described the song as "boudoir-instructional" and felt that "Aaliyah's voice weaves through the sparse but punchy arrangements with a mix of sultriness". Brad Cawn from the Chicago Tribune felt that Aaliyah had matured and was "growing into seductive escapades" on "Rock the Boat". Sal Cinquemani from Slant Magazine compared the song to the work of Janet Jackson and Marvin Gaye; he ultimately felt that Aaliyah did "80's retro" songs better than other artists. In a retrospective review, Billboard felt that due to issues surrounding "Rock the Boat", that it "will always carry near-mythical significance". Ultimately, the "song crystallizes the things we loved, and continue to love, about Aaliyah: Her angelic vocals, her seductive delivery, her aura of strength and sexual liberation and (thanks to the video) her innate talent as a dancer, all layered over a sleek, infectious beat that seems to loop forever".

== Accolades ==
Awards and nominations for "Rock the Boat"
Year	Award	Category	Result	Ref.
2002	NAACP Image Award	Outstanding Music Video	Nominated	
2002	Grammy Award	Best Female R&B Vocal Performance	Nominated	
2002	Soul Train Music Award	Best R&B/Soul Single – Female	Won	
2002	BET Award	Video of the Year	Nominated	
2002	BET Award	Viewer's Choice	Nominated	
2002	Billboard R&B/Hip-Hop Award	Top R&B/Hip-Hop Single	Nominated	
2002	Billboard R&B/Hip-Hop Award	Top R&B/Hip-Hop Single – Airplay	Nominated	
2002	Soul Train Lady of Soul Award	Best R&B/Soul Single, Solo	Won	
2002	Soul Train Lady of Soul Award	R&B/Soul or Rap Song of the Year	Won	
2002	Soul Train Lady of Soul Award	Best R&B/Soul or Rap Music Video	Nominated	
2002	MTV Video Music Award	Best R&B Video	Nominated	

Rankings for "Rock the Boat"
Year	Publication	Accolade	Rank	Ref.
2011	AllMusic	Andy Kellman's 100 Favorite Charting R&B Singles of 2000–2009	2	
2017	Liveabout.com	The 100 Best Pop Songs of 2002	54	
2018	Billboard	The 100 Greatest Music Videos of the 21st Century: Critics' Picks	93	
2021	Billboard	The 100 Greatest Songs of 2001: Staff Picks	16	
2021	Harper's Bazaar	40 of the Best Songs from the 2000s	–	
2022	Time Out	The 60 greatest Summer Songs of all time	26	
2024	Rolling Stone	The 100 Greatest R&B Songs of the 21st Century	15	

== Commercial performance ==
In the United States, "Rock the Boat" debuted at number 57 on the Billboard Hot 100 on September 8, 2001. It peaked at number 14 in its 12th week, spending a total of 25 weeks on the chart. The song peaked at number two on the Hot R&B/Hip-Hop Singles & Tracks chart on November 24. On the Rhythmic Top 40 chart, the song peaked at number 13 in its 19th week, on January 12, 2002. Following its 2021 digital release, "Rock the Boat" debuted and peaked at number 15 on the US Digital Song Sales chart for the week of September 25, 2021.

In the United Kingdom, "Rock the Boat" debuted and peaked at number 12 on the UK Singles Chart and number four on the UK R&B Chart. In Scotland, the song debuted and peaked at number 32 on May 12, 2002. According to the Official Charts Company (OCC), "Rock the Boat" is Aaliyah's fourth best-selling single in the UK. In Belgium, the song peaked at number nine on the Ultratip chart in Wallonia on April 4. In the Netherlands, it peaked at number nine on the Dutch Top 40, and at number 12 on the Single Top 100, both on March 16.

== Music video ==
=== Background ===
Preparation for shooting "Rock the Boat" began weeks in advance, with director Hype Williams contacting Aaliyah's stylist and choreographer "separately to discuss his vision for the video". According to Aaliyah's former choreographer Fatima Robinson, "The whole concept was Hype's. The song has such a wonderful, sensual, sexual vibe to it, and we wanted to play along with that. The beautiful beach, the idea of dancing on the yacht, were all Hype's idea. We just wanted to have this really beautiful, classy, elegant video." Speaking about the filming locations, Derek Lee, Aaliyah's former stylist stated, "He said, we're shooting here, here, and here, and that's all, Back then, when you worked with an artist all the time, directors didn't really say too much. They were just like, do what you do. Make sure it works within the framework." On August 21, 2001, Aaliyah appeared on BET's 106 & Park, and announced that the accompanying music video for "Rock the Boat" was to be directed by Hype Williams and that filming would begin the following day. In a 2021 interview with The Dr. Oz Show, Aaliyah's uncle and record label boss, Barry Hankerson stated that he did not want to use Hype Williams for the video shoot. He said, "There was a push from management, which is [Aaliyah]'s mom to do a video with Hype. I did not want to work with Hype Williams. I regret that. If I could do it over again I would not have worked with him [...] I was for having no linkage to Robert Kelly at all, through directors or whatever. It came up that way and I lost that battle and Hype became the director."

=== Production ===
The video's dance routine was choreographed by Aaliyah's close friend Fatima Robinson and dancers in the video included Carmit Bachar, Denosh Bennett, Nadine Ellis and Electrik Red members Binkie and Lesley. There wasn't a lot of time to rehearse choreography and they rehearsed three days before production began in a Miami dance studio. Robinson stated, "We only did a few days, it wasn't long at all, But [Aaliyah] was an amazing dancer, and caught on really fast. Sometimes, she felt like she couldn't get it, but I would push her a little harder, [and say,] 'You got this." Recalling her experience with Aaliyah Ellis said, "Aaliyah was there for all the rehearsals, "She came in and learned along with us, hung out with us, and was very, very cool. That's the memory of her that stands out for me. There have been artists who, when they don't have to be around the dancers, will step into another room or will get there with just enough time to learn the choreography and move on with their day. But she really wanted to be there. It just reminded me how much of a girl she still was."

On August 22, she filmed both the underwater and green screen scenes for the video in Miami, Florida. Ellis, "had been cast as Aaliyah's "mirror" for the green screen portion—a dance partner who reflected Aaliyah's "hip swivels". The idea for the mirror dance moves "stemmed from Robinson's natural meshing with Aaliyah when they danced together, which she likened to synchronized swimming." After filming the green screen portion, "the crew decamped for a hotel swimming pool", where Aaliyah was filmed underwater. The following day, Aaliyah and employees of Virgin Records America flew to the Bahamas on two flights using a Fairchild Metro III, chartered through Sky Limo. Nearly 60 people worked on the video in the Bahamas. Upon her arrival to the Bahamas, Aaliyah began filming very early on the beach by 6:30 AM on August 24.

On the final shoot day, Aaliyah and her dancers filmed the yacht portion of the video. "The dancers loaded onto the catamaran in the morning, then changed into their all-white costumes to film choreography", which differed from the look and feel of the green screen dance moves. "Miami was really technical, because you had to be within certain parameters, making sure you were on your mark and that all the spacing was right," But when we got to The Bahamas, it was definitely more of a free space. We just got to flow", says Ellis. Aaliyah was scheduled to leave the Bahamas on August 26, but chose to leave the day before since she had finished early. Williams recalled: "Aaliyah left mid-production, so we were still shooting when she left". When discussing working with Aaliyah on the video, Williams stated: "Those four days were very beautiful for everyone. We all worked together as a family." Williams said that the camaraderie on the set was a refreshing change from the usual shoot, adding: "The last day, Saturday, was one of the best I've had in this business. Everyone felt part of something special, part of her song."

=== Fashion ===
Speaking about the fashion aspect of the video, Lee stated "'Rock the Boat' wasn't a fashion video per se, It was more to showcase a softer side of her, Yes Aaliyah had to be the superstar girl, but she also had to be relatable". He continued, "Nothing could look styled—it had to be achievable and doable by young girls". In the video, Aaliyah wore various outfits, including a tie-dye skirt, which was fabric her stylist Derek Lee bought on Fifth Avenue and simply tied together, with an orange crop top he purchased at Patricia Field's shop in the East Village. Lee was also heavily influenced by Jamaican dancehall culture for an all-red outfit, whose accessories were all custom-made, with Lee stating: "In Jamaica, people were using what they had around them to make things, so we took a Coca-Cola can, we cut it up, made the band around the top and around the Kangol hat. We even made some earrings that were little Coke bottles." For the underwater scenes, Williams suggested that Aaliyah wore an outfit with a lot of fabric "so it can seem like she's floating", so Lee styled her in a swimsuit designed by Norma Kamali and added extra fabric to elongate it.

=== Synopsis ===
Aaliyah shown swimming underwater in the music video for "Rock the Boat"

The music video for "Rock the Boat" begins with Aaliyah on the beach with her back to the ocean. She is wearing a red top, dangling hoop earrings and shimmering gold eye shadow as she sings the slyly suggestive lyrics of "Rock the Boat". The next scene then features Aaliyah dancing on a catamaran "with a troop of dancers". Fairclough, felt the use of "the catamaran as a floating performance space, in the music video, reclaims the repurposing of the yacht as a method of male kidnap or seduction of the female". After the boat scene she and her dancers are shown dancing in computer-generated tide waves. For the remainder of the video the beach scenes, along the boat scene and an under water swimming scene are all shown simultaneously. While describing the video's recurring theme, BET producer Kevin Taylor mentioned: "It's very ethereal and heavenly." He also stated: "There are lots of shots of water and clouds, and the video ends with Aaliyah swimming up from the bottom of a pool, almost looking like she's going into the clouds. It's really beautiful."

=== Release and reception ===
Due to the tragedy surrounding Aaliyah's death, there was an uncertainty about the release date for the video. In a press release, a spokesperson for Blackground Records said it was too soon to say what would become of the footage. Nevertheless, the music video made its world premiere on BET's Access Granted on October 9, 2001. BET producer Kevin Taylor, who was in the Bahamas during the filming of the video, described it as "gorgeous and sensual". The video was well received by the public, spending a total of 37 days at the No. 1 spot on BET's 106 & Park. During the week ending October 14, the video premiered on MTV, seven days later it premiered on VH1. 14 days after it debuted on MTV, "Rock the Boat" became the 4th most played video on the network. In the UK, the video was made available to stream online ahead of its May 6 release date via Dotmusic's website starting on April 16, 2002.

Author Ytasha L. Womack argued in her book Afrofuturism: The World of Black Sci-Fi and Fantasy Culture (2013), that the floating scene from the video is an archetypical reference to ancient Egyptian goddess Isis and water spirit Mami Wata. The video was ranked at number 93 on Billboard's list of the 100 Greatest Music Videos of the 21st Century. Rebecca Milzoff from Billboard praised the video, saying: "The video for Aaliyah's sinuous 'Rock the Boat' might have easily gone down as just one of the many examples of the beloved singer's preternatural cool and low-key sex appeal, featuring Aaliyah leading an all-female ensemble in understatedly sexy moves mirroring the song's hypnotic, undulating melody." Maxine Wally from W, felt that the video was fairly simple and that the best parts "comes at the very end, and is just as unadorned. Aaliyah, in what appears to be a candid moment, laughs widely as she looks to her left, like someone off-camera just did something charming and hilarious. In my eyes, it is the perfect way to cap off her final creation. It's a reminder that although Aaliyah isn't around today, her legacy remains". Nylon write Steffanee Wang said this video "will forever be how she's remembered: basking in eternal paradise, almost too perfect to have ever been real."

== Aaliyah's death ==
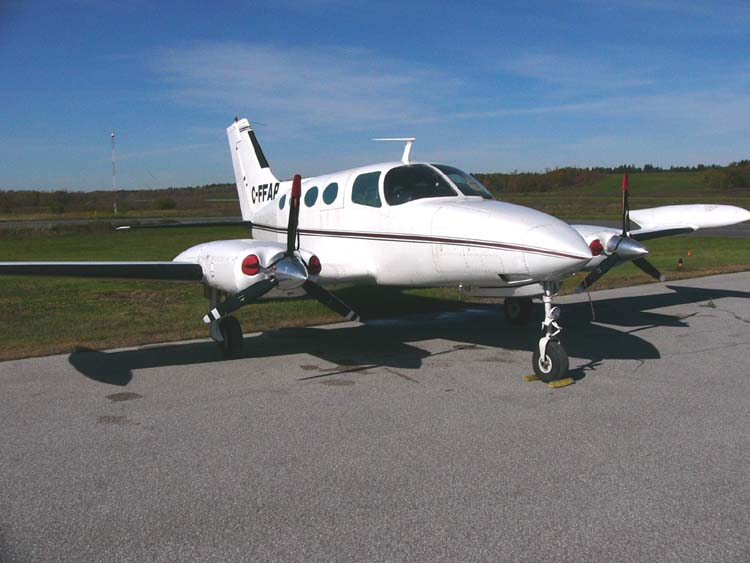
A Cessna 402 similar to the one that crashed

On Saturday, August 25, 2001, after Aaliyah and the record company employees had completed filming the music video for "Rock the Boat", at 6:50 p.m. (EDT), they boarded a twin-engine Cessna 402B (registration N8097W) at the Marsh Harbour Airport, located on the Abaco Islands, for the return trip back to Opa-locka Airport in Florida. The return flight was originally booked for the following day, but filming had finished early, and Aaliyah and her entourage were eager to return to the United States. They made the decision to leave immediately. The aircraft designated for the return flight was smaller than the one on which they had originally arrived, but it accommodated the whole party and all of their equipment.

The passengers had grown impatient because the plane was supposed to arrive at 4:30 p.m. EDT, but did not arrive until 6:15 p.m. EDT. Charter pilot Lewis Key claimed to have overheard passengers arguing with fellow pilot Luis Morales III prior to take off, adding that Morales warned them that there was too much weight for a "safe flight". Key further stated: "He tried to convince them the plane was overloaded, but they insisted they had chartered the plane and they had to be in Miami Saturday night." Key indicated that Morales gave in to the passengers and that he had trouble starting one of the engines.

The aircraft crashed shortly after takeoff, about 200 feet (60 m) from the runway. Aaliyah and eight others on board–Morales, hair stylist Eric Foreman, Anthony Dodd, security guard Scott Gallin, family friend Keith Wallace, make-up artist Christopher Maldonado, and Blackground Records employees Douglas Kratz and Gina Smith–were all killed. Gallin survived the initial impact and, according to paramedics, spent his last moments worrying about Aaliyah's condition. Kathleen Bergen, spokeswoman for the U.S. Federal Aviation Administration (FAA) in Atlanta, identified the aircraft as being owned by Florida-based company Skystream. Initial crash reports identified Luis Morales as "L Marael".

Key suggested that engine failure, along with overloading of the aircraft, could have caused the crash, recalling that others had seen the plane experience an engine failure on takeoff. One witness believed that no one could have survived the accident because of the crash intensity and the fact that the aircraft had disintegrated upon impact. He also recalled the condition of the bodies: "It was an awful sight. Some bodies were so badly disfigured, you couldn't identify them. And two guys were alive — one screaming and screaming for help. He was horribly burned all over." A 25-year-old charter pilot who witnessed the crash saw the Cessna go down as he was working on some machinery "about half a mile" away. He recalled the aircraft being only "60 to 100 feet" off the ground before it crashed. He went to get a fire truck and was stunned by what he saw upon arriving at the crash site. "I've seen crashes before but that was probably one of the worst ones," he said. "It was pretty devastating. The aircraft was broken into pieces and some of the seats were thrown from the aircraft."

After news of the accident filtered back to the remaining crew still on the island, the dancers were too afraid to get on a plane to make their way back to the United States. Choreographer Fatima Robinson identified the remains of Aaliyah. Then, Robinson's personal friend Lenny Kravitz sent his private jet to the island to collect her and the dancers.

== Legacy ==
"Rock the Boat" has been covered and sampled by numerous recording artists. American singer and actor Colton Ford covered the song for his second studio album Under the Covers (2009), while American singer JoJo performed it on several of her concerts. Aaliyah was credited as a featured artist, alongside Ne-Yo, on American rapper Rick Ross' 2010 song "She Crazy" from his mixtape Ashes to Ashes, which sampled "Rock the Boat". Excerpts of Aaliyah singing on "Rock the Boat" were used on Canadian singer The Weeknd's song "What You Need" from his debut mixtape House of Balloons (2011), and American rapper T.I.'s 2016 song "Dope", featuring Marsha Ambrosius. American rapper Kanye West lyrically interpolated "Rock the Boat" in the song "Fade" from his seventh studio album The Life of Pablo (2016). Canadian rapper Drake referenced the Aaliyah song on his track "Middle of the Ocean" from his album Her Loss (2022), stating: "The boat was rockin' too much on some Aaliyah shit". Singer-songwriter Teedra Moses cites "Rock the Boat" as inspiration for her debut album Complex Simplicity (2004). According to Moses, "I just wanted to make an album that sounded like “Rock the Boat,” because that song reminds me of a time I was nostalgic to when I was young in New Orleans and all these sounds, they felt so good. “Rock the Boat” will rock forever, it’s a timeless record". South African singer Tyla noted the sexual lyrics in her 2023 song "Water" from her album Tyla was inspired by "Rock The Boat". American comedian John Early and his band The Lemon Squares covered the song for his 2024 debut album Now More Than Ever, with their cover being performed in the musical style of Burt Bacharach. In 2026, Japanese vocal group XG paid homage to Aaliyah in their song of the same title, including the lyric "Okay, we could take it two ways, Liyah worked the middle while singing on top of blue waves".

== Track listings and formats ==
European CD single

1. "Rock the Boat" (album version) – 4:34
2. "Rock the Boat" (instrumental) – 4:34

European maxi CD single

1. "Rock the Boat" (album version) – 4:34
2. "Rock the Boat" (club mix by Mixzo) – 5:18
3. "Rock the Boat" (club mix by Doug Lazy) – 4:20
4. "Rock the Boat" (music video) – 5:27

European 12-inch vinyl

1. "Rock the Boat" (album version) – 4:34
2. "Rock the Boat" (instrumental) – 4:34
3. "Rock the Boat" (club mix by Mixzo) – 5:18
4. "Rock the Boat" (club mix by Doug Lazy) – 4:20

UK cassette single

1. "Rock the Boat" (radio edit) – 3:37
2. "Rock the Boat" (club mix by Mixzo) – 5:18
3. "Rock the Boat" (club mix by Doug Lazy) – 4:20

French CD single

1. "Rock the Boat" (album version) – 4:34
2. "Rock the Boat" (club mix by Mixzo) – 5:18

Australian maxi CD single

1. "Rock the Boat" (album version) – 4:34
2. "Rock the Boat" (club mix) – 5:16
3. "We Need a Resolution" (featuring Timbaland) – 4:02

== Credits and personnel ==
Credits are adapted from the liner notes of Aaliyah.

- Aaliyah – vocals
- Chandler Bridges – engineering assistance
- Ben Garrison – mixing
- Acar Keys – engineering
- Eric Seats – instrumentation, production, writing
- Static Major – writing
- Rapture Stewart – instrumentation, production, writing

== Charts ==
=== Weekly charts ===
2001–2002 weekly chart performance for "Rock the Boat"
Chart	Peak position
Australia (ARIA)	49
Australian Urban (ARIA)	15
Australian Urban (ARIA) with "More Than a Woman"	10
Belgium (Ultratop 50 Flanders)	43
Belgium (Ultratip Bubbling Under Wallonia)	9
Canada (Nielsen SoundScan)	63
Europe (European Hot 100 Singles)	47
Germany (GfK)	70
Ireland (IRMA)	43
Netherlands (Dutch Top 40)	9
Netherlands (Single Top 100)	12
Scottish Singles Sales (Official Charts)	32
Switzerland (Schweizer Hitparade)	59
UK Singles (Official Charts)	12
UK Hip Hop/R&B (Official Charts)	4
US Billboard Hot 100	14
US Hot R&B/Hip-Hop Songs (Billboard)	2
US Rhythmic Airplay (Billboard)	13
US Top 40 Tracks (Billboard)	37

2021 weekly chart performance for "Rock the Boat"
Chart	Peak position
US R&B Digital Song Sales (Billboard)	2

=== Year-end charts ===
2001 year-end chart performance for "Rock the Boat"
Chart	Position
US Hot R&B/Hip-Hop Singles & Tracks (Billboard)	41

2002 year-end chart performance for "Rock the Boat"
Chart	Position
Netherlands (Dutch Top 40)	108
UK Urban (Music Week)	33
US Billboard Hot 100	85
US Hot R&B/Hip-Hop Singles & Tracks (Billboard)	26
US Rhythmic Top 40 (Billboard)	60

== Certifications ==
Region	Certification	Certified units/sales
New Zealand (RMNZ)	Gold	15,000^{‡}
United Kingdom (BPI)	Silver	200,000^{‡}
^{‡} Sales+streaming figures based on certification alone.

== Release history ==
Release dates and formats for "Rock the Boat"
Region	Date	Format(s)	Label(s)	Ref.
United States	August 21, 2001	Digital download; rhythmic contemporary radio	Blackground; Virgin	
United States	September 25, 2001	Urban adult contemporary radio	Blackground; Virgin	
Australia	November 26, 2001	Maxi CD	EMI	
Canada	January 15, 2002	CD	EMI	
Germany	April 1, 2002	CD	EMI	
France	April 2, 2002	CD	Hostile	
United Kingdom	May 6, 2002	12-inch vinyl; cassette; CD	Virgin	

== Bibliography ==
- Fairclough, Kristy; Halligan, Benjamin; Rambarran, Shara; Persley, Nicole Hodges (2023). Diva: Feminism and Fierceness from Pop to Hip-Hop. Bloomsbury Publishing. ISBN 9781501368257.
- Farley, Christopher John (2002). Aaliyah: More Than a Woman. Simon & Schuster. ISBN 0-7434-5566-5.
- Strong, Martin C. (November 30, 2004). The Great Rock Discography (7th ed.). Canongate Books. ISBN 1841956155.
- Sutherland, William (2005). Aaliyah Remembered. Trafford Publishing. ISBN 1412050626.
- Womack, Ytasha L. (2013). Afrofuturism: The World of Black Sci-Fi and Fantasy Culture. Chicago Review Press. ISBN 9781613747995.
