= Craig Seymour =

American writer

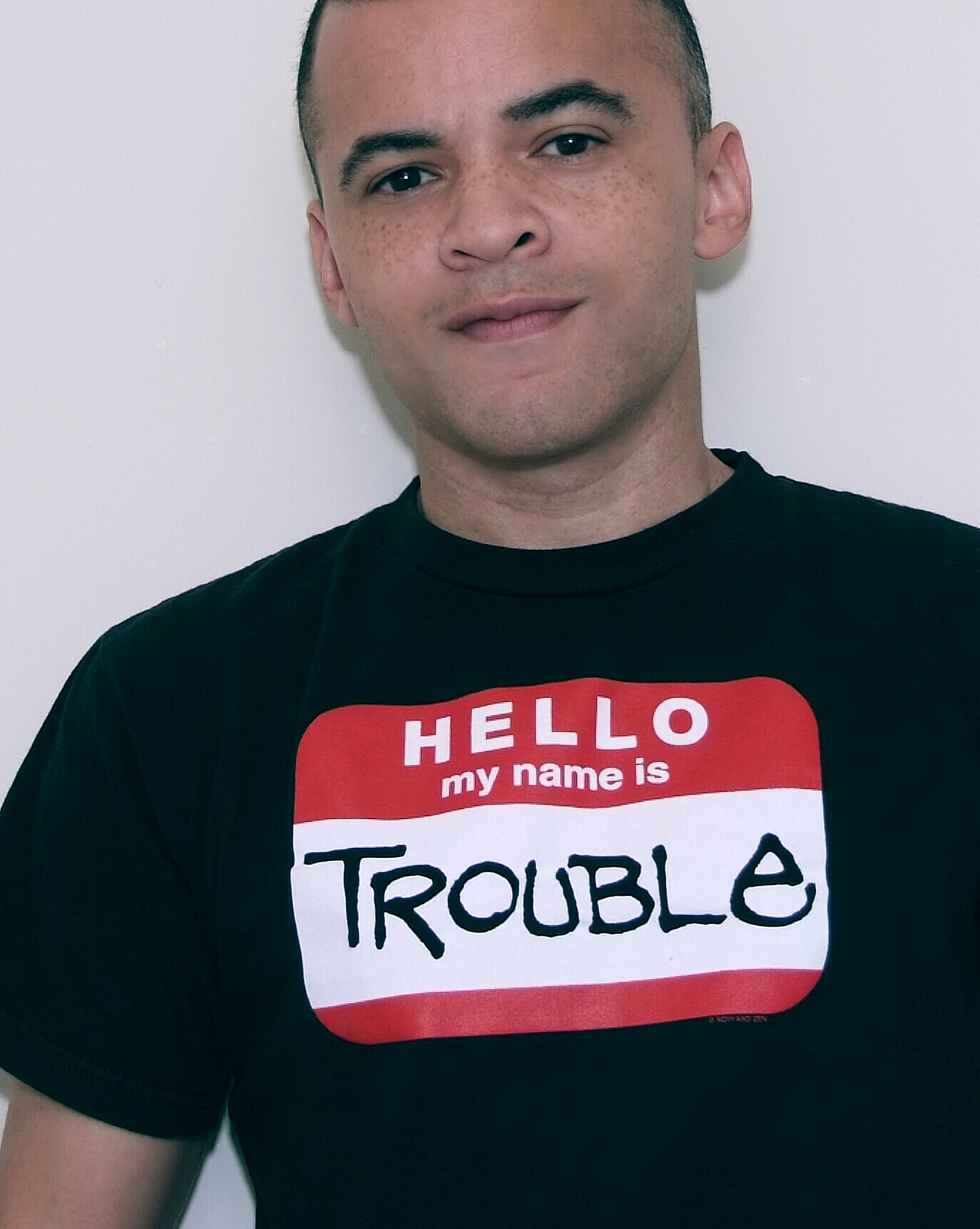
- Born: November 25, 1968 (age 57); Washington, D.C., United States
- Occupations: Writer, photographer, interviewer, professor
- Writing career
- Genre: LGBT
- Notable works: All I Could Bare: My Life in the Strip Clubs of Gay Washington, D.C.

Craig Seymour (born November 25, 1968) is an American writer, photographer, celebrity interviewer, music critic and former stripper. He was born in Washington, D.C. He has written for The Washington Post, Entertainment Weekly, Vibe, and Spin, among other publications, and has served as pop music critic for The Buffalo News and The Atlanta Journal-Constitution. He holds a Ph.D. in American Studies from the University of Maryland, College Park in College Park. Seymour was formerly a professor of English at the University of Massachusetts Dartmouth and Associate Professor of Journalism at Northern Illinois University. He lives in Chicago.

He has interviewed and profiled some of the biggest names in music, including Janet Jackson, Mariah Carey, and Luther Vandross, who granted him numerous interviews. Seymour has also been a music analyst for CNN's Headline News. He is a native of Washington, D.C.

== Book — All I Could Bare ==
As a graduate student at the University of Maryland in the 1990s, Seymour started frequenting the strip clubs in Washington D.C. while writing his master's thesis: "Desire and Dollar Bills: An Ethnography of a Gay Male Striptease Club." He used these experiences to write the book All I Could Bare: My Life in the Strip Clubs of Gay Washington, D.C. Seymour stated that stripping gave him the confidence he needed to interview big stars like Mariah Carey. In an interview with Dallas Voice, Seymour credited his stripping career with "the ease I had asking celebrities extremely personal questions, especially those having to do with sex and relationships. After all, when someone is playing with your dick in public, it’s not only potentially awkward for you, the one being played with, it can also be weird for the person doing the playing, because he is exposing his desires so nakedly in front of other people."

== Book — Luther: The Life and Longing of Luther Vandross ==
This book chronicles the life of singer and producer Luther Vandross, including his lifelong love of music and his infatuations with girl groups, particularly Patti LaBelle and the Bluebelles and Dionne Warwick. Seymour includes mini-profiles of the many musicians who helped Vandross along his way.

When Seymour pressed Vandross in a 1998 interview to open up about his sexuality, including rumours that he was gay, Vandross told him "You're trying to zero in on something that you are never ever gonna get. Look at you, just circling the airport. You ain't never gonna land."

== Bibliography ==
- All I Could Bare: My Life in the Strip Clubs of Gay Washington, D.C.. New York: Atria. June 2008. ISBN 978-1-4165-4205-6.
- Luther: The Life and Longing of Luther Vandross. New York: Harper Paperbacks. July 2005. ISBN 0-06-077923-3.
