= Christopher John Farley =

Jamaican-American journalist (born 1966)

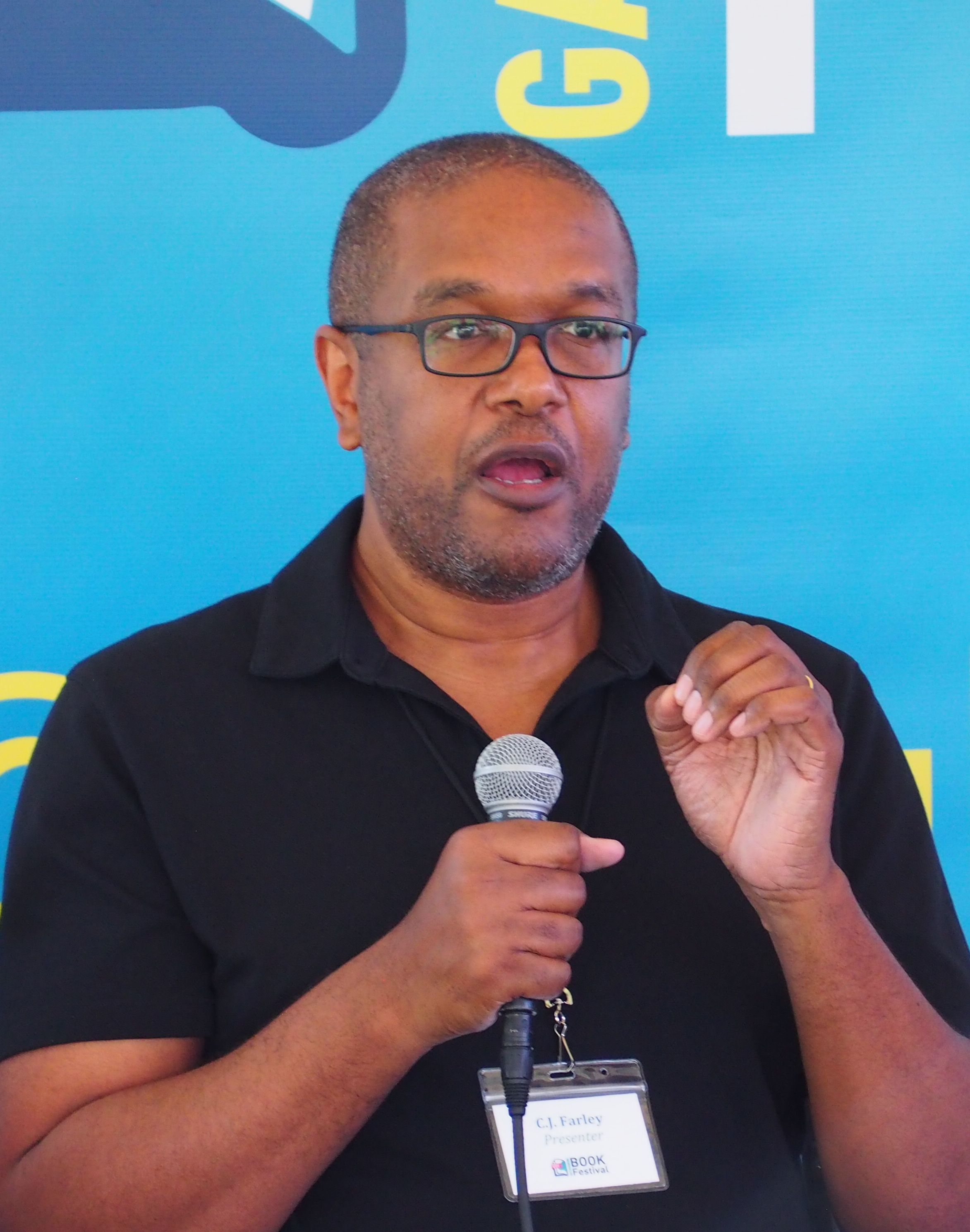
- Farley reading at the 2022 Gaithersburg Book Festival
- Born: July 28, 1966 (age 59); Kingston, Jamaica
- Occupations: Journalist, author, columnist

Christopher John Farley (born July 28, 1966) is a Jamaican-born American journalist, columnist, and author.

== Early life ==
Farley was born in Kingston, Jamaica, and grew up in New York. He is a graduate of Brockport High School and Harvard University, where he edited the Harvard Lampoon. He has been a writer for Time magazine since 1992. He is an editor of The Wall Street Journal. In May 2005, Time published Chris's interview with comedian Dave Chappelle.

== Career ==
Farley is the author of the fact-based novel Kingston by Starlight, the novel My Favorite War; and biographies Before the Legend: The Rise of Bob Marley; Aaliyah, More Than a Woman; Introducing Halle Berry; and is a co-author of Martin Scorsese Presents the Blues: A Musical Journey. In 2004, at the passing of legendary rhythm and blues recording artist and singer Ray Charles, Farley and fellow journalist Anthony DeCurtis, pianist Marcus Roberts, and violinist and record producer Phil Ramone all appeared in an installment of the Charlie Rose show, titled "An Appreciation of Ray Charles", which was dedicated to the singer's music and his memory and legacy.
