= Come Over (Aaliyah song) =

Single by Aaliyah featuring Tank

from the album I Care 4 U
- Released: April 29, 2003
- Recorded: 1999
- Studio: Sony (New York)
- Genre: R&B
- Length: 3:55
- Label: Blackground; Universal
- Songwriters: Phalon Alexander; Johntá Austin; Bryan-Michael Cox; Kevin Hicks
- Producers: Bryan-Michael Cox; Jazze Pha; Kevin Hicks

Aaliyah singles chronology
"I Care 4 U" (2003)	"Come Over" (2003)	"Are You Feelin' Me?" (2005)

Tank singles chronology
"Let Me Live" (2002)	"Come Over" (2003)	"Tonite, I'm Yours" (2003)

Audio video
- "Come Over" on YouTube

"Come Over" is a song recorded by American singer Aaliyah, featuring background vocals from American singer Tank. It was written by Phalon "Jazze Pha" Alexander, Johntá Austin, Bryan-Michael Cox, and Kevin Hicks, while being produced by Alexander, Cox and Hicks. The song was originally recorded for Aaliyah's eponymous third and final studio album (2001). It was not included in the final track listing, and "Come Over" was instead given to American duo Changing Faces, who included their version on their third studio album Visit Me (2000).

Following Aaliyah's August 25, 2001 death, her version of "Come Over" was included on her posthumous compilation album I Care 4 U (2002). Critically acclaimed, it was released as the album's fourth and final single on April 29, 2003, by Blackground Records and Universal Records. A moderate commercial success, "Come Over" peaked at number 32 on the US Billboard Hot 100.

== Background and recording ==
Johntá Austin wrote "Come Over" alongside its producers Bryan-Michael Cox, Kevin Hicks and Phalon "Jazze Pha" Alexander. Aaliyah recorded the song at the Sony Music Studios in New York City in 1999, a day after recording "I Don't Wanna". Pha recalled that the production was "the most angelic and effortless piece of work I have ever done, and it wasn't even work", also describing working with Aaliyah as "magical with some setbacks".

"Come Over" features background vocals from singer Tank. He retrospectively stated that his inclusion on the track occurred spontaneously while he was visiting Aaliyah and Austin at the Sony Music Studios. Originally recorded for Aaliyah's eponymous third and final studio album, the song was instead given to American duo Changing Faces, who included their version on their third studio album Visit Me (2000).

== Release ==
"Come Over" was serviced to rhythmic contemporary and urban contemporary radio in the United States on April 29, 2003, as the fourth and final single from I Care 4 U, by Blackground Records and Universal Records. In August 2021, it was reported that Aaliyah's recorded work for Blackground (since rebranded as Blackground Records 2.0) would be re-released on physical, digital, and, for the first time ever, streaming services in a deal between the label and Empire Distribution. I Care 4 U, including "Come Over", was re-released on October 8.

== Critical reception ==
Ross Scarano from Complex praised Aaliyah's vocal performance on "Come Over", saying: "Aaliyah's voice did longing so well. The lightness of her touch when stretching out and fluttering the final syllable of a word like 'over' in 'Come Over' is too pretty". Scarano also felt that certain parts within the song, such as the dying cellphone bit, were amusing. Bianca Gracie from Fuse praised Aaliyah's vocals saying, "Her unique falsetto from her teen days is still there, but after a few years of experience and relationships it sounds stronger and more pure". Caroline Sullivan from The Guardian stated "the improvised final bars of Come Over show just how effortless a soul vocalist she was, and point to what might have been". In contrary, Sal Cinquemani from Slant Magazine reviewed the song negatively, calling it "lackluster". In a retrospective review, Billboard praised Aaliyah's delivery on the song and felt that it will remain an after-hours anthem for years to come".

== Credits and personnel ==
Credits are adapted from the liner notes of I Care 4 U.

- Aaliyah – lead vocals
- Johntá Austin – writing
- Bryan-Michael Cox – production, writing
- Kevin Hicks – production, writing
- Jazze Pha – production, writing
- Acar Keys – engineering, mixing
- Tank – backing vocals

== Charts ==
=== Weekly charts ===
Chart (2003)	Peak position
US Billboard Hot 100	32
US Hot R&B/Hip-Hop Songs (Billboard)	9

=== Year-end charts ===
Chart (2003)	Position
US Billboard Hot 100	92
US Hot R&B/Hip-Hop Songs (Billboard)	22
