= Don't Know What to Tell Ya =

Single by Aaliyah

from the album I Care 4 U
- B-side: "Miss You"; "Got to Give It Up"; "Try Again"
- Released: February 11, 2003
- Recorded: 2001
- Studio: Manhattan Center (New York City)
- Genre: Funk; dance
- Length: 5:01
- Label: Blackground; Universal
- Songwriters: Stephen Garrett; Timothy Mosley; Salah El Sharnouby (Note: "Don't Know What to Tell Ya" contains a sample from "Batwannis Beek" by Warda Al-Jazairia. Salah El Sharnouby, who composed the music for "Batwanes Beek", was uncredited prior to the 2021 reissue of I Care 4 U.)
- Producer: Timbaland

Aaliyah singles chronology
| "Miss You" (2002) | "Don't Know What to Tell Ya" (2003) | "I Care 4 U" (2003) |

Audio video
- "Don't Know What to Tell Ya" on YouTube

Alternative cover
- UK edition cover

"Don't Know What to Tell Ya" is a song recorded by American singer Aaliyah. It was written by Static Major and Timbaland for her eponymous third studio album (2001), and was produced by the latter. However, it did not make the final cut for Aaliyah and remained unreleased until after Aaliyah's August 25, 2001 death. The song was then included on the posthumous compilation album I Care 4 U (2002) and was released as its second single on February 11, 2003, by Blackground Records and Universal Records.

Upon its release, "Don't Know What to Tell Ya" received generally favorable reviews from music critics. With many praising both Aaliyah's voice and production of the song. Due to a limited release, it only peaked at number 70 on the US Hot R&B/Hip-Hop Singles Sales. It fared better internationally, peaking at number 22 in the United Kingdom and within the top 40 in Australia and Switzerland.

== Music and lyrics ==
Musically, "Don't Know What to Tell Ya" was described as having a "noir-funk feel that evokes Blade Runner". While, Joseph Patel from Blender labeled the song as a "syncopated dance marvel". The song sample's the Egyptian Arabic song "Batwanes Beek" by Warda. Originally its composer Salah El Sharnouby had not been credited for his work. Lyrically on the record, Aaliyah discusses a failing relationship. In her book Baby Girl: Better Known as Aaliyah (2021), author–journalist Kathy Iandoli, further explained that the lyrics talks about, "Aaliyah refusing to be tied down by a controlling relationship, as she compares it to incarceration".

== Release ==
"Don't Know What to Tell Ya" was released as the second international single from I Care 4 U on February 11, 2003, by Blackground Records and Universal Records. In the United States, it was released as the fourth and final single from the album, as a double A-side single with the remix of "Got to Give It Up", on September 9.

In August 2021, it was reported that Aaliyah's recorded work for Blackground (since rebranded as Blackground Records 2.0) would be re-released on physical, digital, and, for the first time ever, streaming services in a deal between the label and Empire Distribution. I Care 4 U and Ultimate Aaliyah, both including "Don't Know What to Tell Ya", were re-released on October 8.

== Critical reception ==
While reviewing "I Care 4 U" Nekesa Mumbi Moody from the Associated Press described "Don't Know What to Tell Ya" as "dramatic" and felt that it was the best song out of the new material featured on the album. Bianca Gracie from Fuse stated a similar statement as she felt that the song's "Middle Eastern" inspired production made it more "dramatic". Music Week gave a mixed review the publication felt that the song "sounds a bit like work in progress", but "it is still head and shoulders above most other R&B releases out there". Also, they labeled the production as "edgy" and said that Aaliyah's voice "just serves to remind us all what the world has lost". Arion Berger from Rolling Stone praised Aaliyah's vocals on "Don't Know What to Tell Ya", saying: "Her sweet, strong voice whips around the ambivalence" on the song. Sal Cinquemani from Slant Magazine called the song a "cool midtempo number" and described it as "Aaliyah-lite".

== Commercial performance ==
In Europe "Don't Know What to Tell Ya" achieved moderate success, peaking within the top 40 in several countries. In Switzerland the song debuted and peaked at 30 on the Swiss Hitparade chart on May 18, 2003; it remained on the charts for 6 consecutive weeks. In the United Kingdom the song debuted and peaked at number 22 during the week of 9 April 2003 - 25 April 2003. It also peaked at number 5 on the UK Hip Hop/R&B chart. Outside of Europe the song peaked at 34 in Australia on the singles chart. On the Australian Urban chart it peaked at number 14.

== Track listings and formats ==
US 12-inch vinyl

1. "Don't Know What to Tell Ya" (album version) – 5:02
2. "Got to Give It Up" (remix) – 3:58

UK CD single

1. "Don't Know What to Tell Ya" (edited version) – 3:03
2. "Don't Know What to Tell Ya" (Handcuff Remix) (Note: alternative title for the Thomas Eriksen Mix) – 5:18
3. "Miss You" (music video) – 4:17

UK 12-inch vinyl

1. "Don't Know What to Tell Ya" (album version) – 5:02
2. "Try Again" – 4:44
3. "Don't Know What to Tell Ya" (Handcuff Remix) – 5:18

European CD single

1. "Don't Know What to Tell Ya" (radio edit) – 3:35
2. "Don't Know What to Tell Ya" (Thomas Eriksen Mix) – 5:18

European and Australian maxi CD single

1. "Don't Know What to Tell Ya" (radio edit) – 3:35
2. "Don't Know What to Tell Ya" (Thomas Eriksen Mix)– 5:18
3. "Don't Know What to Tell Ya" (Intenso Project Remix) – 6:58
4. "Don't Know What to Tell Ya" (album version) – 5:02

French CD single

1. "Don't Know What to Tell Ya" (album version) – 5:02
2. "Try Again" – 4:44

Belgian, Dutch and Luxembourgish CD single

1. "Don't Know What to Tell Ya" (radio edit) – 3:35
2. "Don't Know What to Tell Ya" (Intenso Project Remix) – 6:58

Belgian, Dutch and Luxembourgish maxi CD single

1. "Don't Know What to Tell Ya" (Thomas Eriksen Mix) – 5:18
2. "Don't Know What to Tell Ya" (Intenso Project Remix) – 6:58
3. "Don't Know What to Tell Ya" (radio edit) – 3:35

== Credits and personnel ==
Credits are adapted from the liner notes of I Care 4 U.

- Aaliyah – vocals
- Jimmy Douglass – mixing, recording
- Salah El Sharnobi – writing
- Static Major – writing
- Timbaland – mixing, production, writing

== Charts ==
2003 weekly chart performance for "Don't Know What to Tell Ya"
| Chart | Peak position |
|---|---|
| Australia (ARIA) | 34 |
| Australian Urban (ARIA) | 14 |
| Europe (European Hot 100 Singles) | 75 |
| France (SNEP) | 49 |
| Germany (GfK) | 57 |
| Ireland (IRMA) | 45 |
| Netherlands (Dutch Top 40 Tipparade) | 7 |
| Netherlands (Single Top 100) | 57 |
| Scotland Singles (Official Charts) | 49 |
| Switzerland (Schweizer Hitparade) | 30 |
| UK Singles (Official Charts) | 22 |
| UK Hip Hop/R&B (Official Charts) | 5 |
| US Hot R&B/Hip-Hop Singles Sales (Billboard) | 70 |

== Release history ==
Release dates and formats for "Don't Know What to Tell Ya"
| Region | Date | Format(s) | Label(s) | Ref. |
|---|---|---|---|---|
| France | February 11, 2003 | CD | Universal Music | |
| United Kingdom | April 14, 2003 | 12-inch vinyl; maxi CD | Independiente | |
| Germany | May 5, 2003 | Maxi CD | Edel | |
| United States | September 9, 2003 | 12-inch vinyl | Blackground; Universal | |
