= I Care 4 U =

- Standard cover (Note: The cover for some international pressings and the digital reissue features a black background. Asian and German limited edition cover displays a purple background. North American and Australian limited edition cover displays the artwork excluding Aaliyah's image, while Japanese pressings use the same cover as the single "Miss You".)

Compilation album by Aaliyah
- Released: December 10, 2002
- Recorded: 1993–March 2001
- Studios: Battery (New York); Capitol (Los Angeles); CRC (Chicago); Chung King (New York); Larrabee (Los Angeles); Magic Mix (Miami); Manhattan Center (New York); Music Grinder (Los Angeles); Pyramid (Ithaca); Sony (New York); The Village (Los Angeles)
- Genres: R&B; dance-pop
- Length: 59:20
- Labels: Blackground; Universal
- Producers: Bud'da; Bryan-Michael Cox; Craig King; Teddy Bishop; Vincent Herbert; Kevin Hicks; R. Kelly; Jazze Pha; Rapture; Eric Seats; Timbaland

Aaliyah chronology
Aaliyah (2001)	I Care 4 U (2002)	Ultimate Aaliyah (2005)

Singles from I Care 4 U
- 1. "Miss You" Released: October 28, 2002; 2. "Don't Know What to Tell Ya" Released: February 11, 2003; 3. "I Care 4 U" Released: April 8, 2003; 4. "Come Over" Released: April 29, 2003

I Care 4 U is a posthumous compilation album by American singer Aaliyah. It was released on December 10, 2002, by Blackground Records and Universal Records. Following Aaliyah's death on August 25, 2001, Blackground decided to release a posthumous record in collaboration with Universal Music Group. The album compiles eight of Aaliyah's previously released songs alongside six previously unreleased recordings which were discarded from sessions for her eponymous third and final studio album (2001).

I Care 4 U received mixed reviews from critics, based on the assessment of the previously unreleased songs and the compilation's breadth in general. Commercially, the album was a success, debuting at number three on the US Billboard 200 and being certified platinum by the Recording Industry Association of America (RIAA). It also reached the top 10 in France, Germany, Switzerland, and the UK. The album produced four singles—"Miss You", "Don't Know What to Tell Ya", "I Care 4 U", and "Come Over".

== Background ==
Between October 2000 and February 2001, Aaliyah filmed her part in the vampire film Queen of the Damned (2002) in Melbourne, simultaneously recording what would become her eponymous third and final studio album. The album was released in July 2001 to widespread critical acclaim. It became a commercial success as well, debuting at number two on the US Billboard 200 and selling 187,000 copies in its first week; it marked the highest sales week of her career to that point.

On August 25, 2001, Aaliyah and eight others were killed in a plane crash in The Bahamas after filming the music video for the single "Rock the Boat". The pilot Luis Morales III was unlicensed at the time of the accident and had traces of cocaine and alcohol in his system. Aaliyah's family later filed a wrongful death lawsuit against Blackhawk International Airways, which was settled out of court. Following Aaliyah's death, Aaliyah reached the top of the Billboard 200, spending 69 weeks on the chart, and had sold 2.6 million copies in the United States by December 2009.

== Recording and production ==
I Care 4 U features both album cuts and previously unreleased tracks and demos, recorded between 1993 and March 2001. The title track was written by Missy Elliott and Timbaland, who also produced the song, and was recorded at the Magic Mix Studios and Music Grinder Studios in Los Angeles in 2000. Aaliyah began to record the song for her second studio album One in a Million (1996), but it was completed after that album had finished post-production, thus she saved it for Aaliyah. Timbaland also wrote and produced "Don't Know What to Tell Ya", which was co-written by Static Major and recorded at the Manhattan Center Studios.

Originally crafted for Ginuwine's second studio album 100% Ginuwine (1999), "Miss You" was written by Ginuwine, Johntá Austin and Teddy Bishop, while being produced by Bishop. In 1999, while Aaliyah was recording her eponymous third studio album (2001) at the Manhattan Center Studios, she requested Austin and Bishop to play her a couple of tracks they had produced with other artists, including "Miss You", for which Ginuwine had already lent his vocals. Bishop later commented: "She was like, 'I want to cut this record' [...] She got on the phone, called him and said 'Hey I know you cut this record already, but I would love to cut it'." Ginuwine allowed her to cut her own version of it and the same night, Aaliyah re-recorded the whole song. Though she reportedly wanted to put the song out herself, her label Blackground Records felt the song was no "smash record", thus it was left unused until after her death.

"Come Over" was written by Johntá Austin, Bryan-Michael Cox, Kevin Hicks and Phalon "Jazze Pha" Alexander, while being produced by Cox, Hicks and Alexander. It was originally recorded for Aaliyah at the Sony Music Studios in New York City, but did not make the album's final cut. When the song was left unused, it was given to American duo Changing Faces, who included their version on their third studio album Visit Me (2000); however, Aaliyah's original version ended up being included on I Care 4 U. Altogether, Natalie Nichols from the Los Angeles Times categorized the albums material as a "minimalist blend of hip-hop, funk, soul and dance-music".

== Marketing and sales ==
In the US, I Care 4 U was released on December 10, 2002, by Blackground Records and Universal Records, with its CD+DVD limited edition being released simultaneously. Ahead of its release, it was announced that a portion of its proceeds would go to the Aaliyah Memorial Fund. With first-week sales of 279,500—largest ever for Aaliyah—the album debuted at number three on the Billboard 200 and atop the Top R&B/Hip-Hop Albums. Selling 222,000 units in its second week, the album descended to number 17 on the Billboard 200 and to number two on the Top R&B/Hip-Hop Albums. It returned to the top 10 on the Billboard 200 and the summit of Top R&B/Hip-Hop Albums the following week; the album sold a total of 769,500 copies throughout its first month. On January 15, 2003, I Care 4 U was certified platinum by the Recording Industry Association of America (RIAA), and sold over 1,600,000 copies by September 2005.

"Miss You", released as the lead single from I Care 4 U on October 28, 2002, (Note: "Miss You" was made available for streaming on October 28, 2002; it was serviced to contemporary hit radio, rhythmic contemporary, urban adult contemporary and urban contemporary radio as I Care 4 U's lead single on November 16.) became a commercial success, peaking at number three on the US Billboard Hot 100 and atop the Hot R&B/Hip-Hop Songs. Its accompanying music video, directed by Darren Grant, featured appearances from various celebrities, including Missy Elliott, Tank, Lil' Kim, Tweet, Queen Latifah, Jaheim, Lil' Jon, Eastside Boyz, Jamie Foxx, DMX, Quincy Jones, and Ananda Lewis. Subsequent singles "I Care 4 U" and "Come Over"—both released in April 2003—reached numbers 16 and 32, respectively, on the Billboard Hot 100, while "Don't Know What to Tell Ya" failed to enter the chart.

In most international markets, I Care 4 U was released in February 2003, reaching the top 10 in France, Germany, the Netherlands, New Zealand, Switzerland and the UK, while also peaking at number two on the European Top 100 Albums. The second single "Don't Know What to Tell Ya", released on February 11, 2003, outperformed its predecessor "Miss You" in several countries, reaching the top 40 in Australia and the UK.

In August 2021, it was reported that the album and Aaliyah's other recorded work for Blackground (since rebranded as Blackground Records 2.0) would be re-released on physical, digital and, for the first time ever, streaming services, in a deal between the label and Empire Distribution, with I Care 4 U being reissued on October 8. The re-release was met with disdain from Aaliyah's estate, who issued a statement denouncing the "unscrupulous endeavor to release Aaliyah's music without any transparency or full accounting to the estate".

I Care 4 U had earlier been released digitally, without permission from Blackground Records, by Craze Productions, using a scan of the international edition cover instead of its digital printing master and without any additional metadata. A lawsuit against Craze Productions was filed by Reservoir Media Management, a marketing partner of Blackground Records at the time, and the jury agreed with them in September 2015. Even after the ruling and the official 2021 reissue, the illegal edition is still available on digital and streaming services.

== Critical reception ==
Professional ratings
Review scores
Source	Rating
AllMusic	4.5/5 stars
The Encyclopedia of Popular Music	3/5 stars
Entertainment Weekly	A−
The Guardian	3/5 stars
Los Angeles Times	2/4 stars
Rolling Stone	3/5 stars
Slant Magazine	3/5 stars
Uncut	1.5/5 stars
Vibe	4/5
The Village Voice	A−

I Care 4 U received mixed reviews from music critics. In a positive review for Entertainment Weekly, Craig Seymour said I Care 4 U showcased Aaliyah's "interpretive talent" and ability to inspire her songwriters, while Graham Smith from musicOMH deemed it "a fine introduction to a much missed artiste", particularly because of the six previously unreleased songs. According to Vibe magazine's Jason King, the album compiled some of the most ambitious dance-pop of the previous ten years. Uncut said Aaliyah's "silvery and subtle reconfigurations of R&B" were showcased on the compiled singles, which AllMusic's John Bush felt reminded listeners of her vocal talent. Bush was also impressed by the previously unreleased tracks, writing that they "provide an intriguing look at where Aaliyah may have taken her career had she lived". Robert Christgau was somewhat less enthusiastic, viewing I Care 4 U as an incomplete compilation whose inconsistent mix of career highlights was nonetheless rectified by the quality of the new tracks, particularly "Erica Kane". In The Village Voice, he wrote:

From 'Age Ain't Nothing but a Number' when she was 15 to 'More Than a Woman' just before she died (the latter included, the former discreetly not), she was lithe and dulcet in a way that signified neither jailbait nor hottie—an ingénue whose selling point was sincerity, not innocence and the obverse it implies. Timbaland's beats add essential eccentricity, but R. Kelly's ditties suited her almost as well.

In a more critical review, Slant Magazine's Sal Cinqeumani was not impressed by the new songs on what he said was "neither a posthumous album of all-new material nor a proper greatest hits package" but "a half-assed attempt at satiating the Aaliyah fan's need for both". Rolling Stone magazine's Arion Berger also felt the album's second half of newer songs was somewhat inferior to Timbaland's "impressive" productions on the first half, while Natalie Nichols of the Los Angeles Times panned the previously unreleased songs as "merely soothing sonic wallpaper, with Aaliyah's pretty yet personality-free voice often treated like just another element in the mix". In The Rolling Stone Album Guide (2004), Keith Harris felt Aaliyah's catalogue warranted a more comprehensive compilation, although he believed the new songs proved she was maturing creatively before her death. Michael Paoletta from Billboard felt that in seven years, Aaliyah "had amassed an impressive track record" and that I Care 4 U showed Aaliyah's growth as an artist. He also mentioned that her "unrealized potential is particularly evident on recent tracks as "More Than a Woman" and the title track." Dan Gennoe from Dotmusic felt that the album "practically rewrites" her musical career by "snubbing" and not including many songs such as "If Your Girl Only Knew"; he deemed the album a "bodged job and a less than ideal epitaph for of one of R&B's most alluring voices".

== Track listing ==
I Care 4 U
No.	Title	Writer(s)	Producer(s)	Length
1.	"Back & Forth"	R. Kelly	Kelly	3:51
2.	"Are You That Somebody?"	Stephen Garrett; Timothy Mosley	Timbaland	4:25
3.	"One in a Million"	Missy Elliott; Mosley	Timbaland	4:30
4.	"I Care 4 U"	Elliott; Mosley; Carl Hampton	Timbaland	4:33
5.	"More Than a Woman"	Garrett; Mosley	Timbaland	3:49
6.	"Don't Know What to Tell Ya"	Garrett; Mosley; Salah El Sharnouby	Timbaland	5:01
7.	"Try Again"	Garrett; Mosley	Timbaland	4:44
8.	"All I Need"	Johnta Austin; Teddy Bishop	Bishop	3:08
9.	"Miss You"	Austin; Bishop; Ginuwine	Bishop	4:05
10.	"Don't Worry"	Austin; Phalon Alexander	Jazze Pha	3:52
11.	"Come Over"	Austin; Bryan-Michael Cox; Kevin Hicks	Cox; Hicks; Jazze Pha	3:55
12.	"Erica Kane"	Garrett; Eric Seats; Rapture Stewart	Seats; Rapture	4:38
13.	"At Your Best (You Are Love)"	Ernie Isley; Marvin Isley; O'Kelly Isley, Jr.; Ronald Isley; Rudolph Isley; Chris Jasper	Kelly	4:52
14.	"Got to Give It Up" (remix)	Marvin Gaye	Vincent Herbert; Craig King; Bud'da^{[a]}	3:58
Total length:				59:21

International edition and reissue (Note: attributed to international CD pressings, digital reissue, US and Japanese reissue CD pressings, and vinyl pressings)
No.	Title	Writer(s)	Producer(s)	Length
15.	"We Need a Resolution" (featuring Timbaland)	Garrett; Mosley	Timbaland	4:07
16.	"Rock the Boat"	Garrett; Seats; Stewart	Seats; Rapture	4:37
Total length:				68:05

=== Notes ===
- ^{^a} signifies an additional producer
- Original international pressings include the music video for "Miss You".
- Limited edition pressings include a bonus DVD containing music videos for tracks 2, 3, 5, 7, and 14–16, alongside "Come Back in One Piece", "4 Page Letter", the Japanimation commercial for Aaliyah, and behind-the-scenes footage. UK limited edition bonus DVD is reduced to music videos for tracks 2, 5, 7, 14, and 15, alongside "Come Back in One Piece" and the Japanimation commercial.
- Japanese edition pressings include "If Your Girl Only Knew" alongside international bonus tracks, and a bonus DVD. The DVD features the same track listing as the one on most limited edition pressings, with the addition of the music video for "Miss You".

Sample credits

- "I Care 4 U" contains an initially uncredited sample from "(Too Little in Common to Be Lovers) Too Much Going to Say Goodbye" by The Newcomers.
- "More Than a Woman" contains an initially uncredited sample from "Alouli Ansa" by Mayada El Hennawy.
- "Don't Know What to Tell Ya" contains an initially uncredited sample from "Batwanes Beek" by Warda Al-Jazairia.

== Personnel ==
Credits are adapted from the liner notes of I Care 4 U.

- Aaliyah – lead vocals
- Johntá Austin – songwriting
- Homer Banks – songwriting (Note: originally uncredited)
- Carlton Batts – mastering
- Teddy Bishop – production, songwriting
- Chandler Bridges – engineering assistance
- Bud'da – production
- Bryan-Michael Cox – production, songwriting
- Tom Coyne – mastering
- Jimmy Douglass – engineering, mixing, production
- Salah El Sharnouby – songwriting
- Missy Elliott – songwriting
- Ben Garrison – mixing
- Marvin Gaye – songwriting
- Ginuwine – songwriting
- Bernie Grundman – mastering
- Carl Hampton – songwriting
- Vincent Herbert – production
- Kevin Hicks – production, songwriting
- Ernie Isley – songwriting
- Marvin Isley – songwriting
- O'Kelly Isley, Jr. – songwriting
- Ronald Isley – songwriting
- Rudolph Isley – songwriting
- Chris Jasper – songwriting
- Jazze Pha – production, songwriting
- R. Kelly – instrumentation, mixing, production, songwriting
- Acar S. Key – engineering, mixing
- Craig King – production
- David LaChapelle – photography
- Mr. Lee – mixing
- Jonathan Mannion – photography
- Peter Mokran – engineering, mixing
- Rapture – instrumentation, production, songwriting
- Eric Seats – instrumentation, production, songwriting
- Static Major – production, songwriting
- Steve Penny – engineering assistance
- Tank – vocals
- Timbaland – mixing, production, songwriting, vocals
- Albert Watson – photography
- Michael Zainer – engineering assistance

== Charts ==
=== Weekly charts ===
2002–2003 weekly chart performance
Chart	Peak position
Australian Albums (ARIA)	43
Australian Urban Albums (ARIA)	6
Austrian Albums (Ö3 Austria)	16
Belgian Albums (Ultratop Flanders)	14
Belgian Albums (Ultratop Wallonia)	19
Canadian Albums (Nielsen SoundScan)	25
Canadian R&B Albums (Nielsen SoundScan)	6
Danish Albums (Hitlisten)	39
Dutch Albums (Album Top 100)	10
European Top 100 Albums (Billboard)	2
Finnish Albums (Suomen virallinen lista)	15
French Albums (SNEP)	4
German Albums (Offizielle Top 100)	2
Greek Albums (IFPI)	32
Irish Albums (IRMA)	13
Japanese Albums (Oricon)	45
New Zealand Albums (RMNZ)	10
Norwegian Albums (VG-lista)	17
Polish Albums (ZPAV)	27
Scottish Albums (Official Charts)	17
Swedish Albums (Sverigetopplistan)	37
Swiss Albums (Schweizer Hitparade)	3
UK Albums (Official Charts)	4
UK R&B Albums (Official Charts)	2
US Billboard 200	3
US Top R&B/Hip-Hop Albums (Billboard)	1

2022 weekly chart performance for the reissue
Chart	Peak position
UK R&B Albums (Official Charts)	32

=== Year-end charts ===
2002 year-end chart performance
Chart	Position
Canadian R&B Albums (Nielsen SoundScan)	91

2003 year-end chart performance
Chart	Position
French Albums (SNEP)	80
German Albums (Offizielle Top 100)	59
UK Albums (OCC)	102
US Billboard 200	45
US Top R&B/Hip-Hop Albums (Billboard)	5

== Certifications ==
Certifications and sales
Region	Certification	Certified units/sales
Canada (Music Canada)	Gold	50,000^{^}
France (SNEP)	Gold	100,000^{*}
Switzerland (IFPI Switzerland)	Gold	20,000^{^}
United Kingdom (BPI)	Gold	100,000^{^}
United Kingdom (BPI) Reissue	Silver	60,000^{‡}
United States (RIAA)	Platinum	1,600,000
^{*} Sales figures based on certification alone.^{^} Shipments figures based on certification alone.^{‡} Sales+streaming figures based on certification alone.

== Release history ==
Release dates and formats
Region	Date	Format(s)	Label(s)	Ref.
United States	December 10, 2002	CD; CD+DVD	Blackground; Universal	
Canada	December 17, 2002	CD+DVD	UMG	
Germany	February 3, 2003	Enhanced CD; enhanced CD + DVD	Edel	
United Kingdom	February 3, 2003	CD; CD+DVD	Independiente	
France	February 4, 2003	Enhanced CD	Warner	
Japan	March 26, 2003	CD+DVD	Avex Trax	
Various	October 8, 2021	Digital download; streaming	Blackground; Empire	
United States	October 8, 2021	CD	Blackground; Empire	
Japan	November 27, 2021	CD	Ultra-Vybe	
United States	September 16, 2022	Vinyl	Blackground; Empire	

== See also ==
- List of music released posthumously
- List of Billboard number-one R&B albums of 2002
- List of Billboard number-one R&B albums of 2003
