= I Care 4 U (song) =

2003 single by Aaliyah

Single by Aaliyah

from the album I Care 4 U
- B-side: "Don't Worry"
- Written: 1996
- Released: April 8, 2003
- Recorded: 1996, 2000
- Studio: Magic Mix; Music Grinder (Los Angeles)
- Genre: Neo soul; R&B
- Length: 4:34
- Label: Blackground; Universal
- Composers: Missy Elliott; Timothy Mosley; Carl Hampton (Note: "I Care 4 U" contains a sample from "(Too Little in Common to Be Lovers) Too Much Going to Say Goodbye" by The Newcomers. Homer Banks and Carl Hampton, who wrote "(Too Little in Common to Be Lovers) Too Much Going to Say Goodbye", were uncredited prior to the 2021 reissue of Aaliyah.); Homer Banks
- Lyricist: Missy Elliott
- Producer: Timbaland

Aaliyah singles chronology
"Don't Know What to Tell Ya" (2003)	"I Care 4 U" (2003)	"Come Over" (2003)

Visualizer video
- "I Care 4 U" on YouTube

"I Care 4 U" is a song recorded by American singer Aaliyah for her eponymous third and final studio album (2001). Written by Missy Elliott and Timbaland, the song was originally recorded for Aaliyah's second studio album One in a Million (1996), but the recording was too late for inclusion on the album. It was subsequently re-recorded for Aaliyah in 2000. A neo soul-R&B ballad, "I Care 4 U" features beatboxing, an electric piano and multi-tracked vocals.

Following Aaliyah's death on August 25, 2001, "I Care 4 U" received heavy airplay in the US despite not having been released as a single, peaking at number 16 on the Billboard Hot 100. The song was then included on Aaliyah's posthumous compilation album of the same title (2002), and was released as its third single on April 8, 2003.

== Writing and recording ==
"I Care 4 U" was written by Missy Elliott, who composed it alongside its sole producer Timbaland. Aaliyah originally recorded the song for her second studio album One in a Million (1996), but it was completed after the album had finished post-production, and she chose to save it for her next album. She felt that it was "just one of those timeless songs. I also love the fact that it's a female saying: 'Don't cry, I'll wipe your tears. I love you, just give me the chance to show you.'" In 2000, the song was re-recorded for Aaliyah at the Magic Mix Studios and the Music Grinder Studios in Los Angeles.

== Music and lyrics ==
Musically, "I Care 4 U" is a neo soul ballad which has been compared to the work of singer Angie Stone. Graham Smith from musicOMH described "I Care 4 U" as a soft, romantic R&B ballad. The song includes an initially uncredited sample of "(Too Little in Common to Be Lovers) Too Much Going to Say Goodbye" by The Newcomers. It features beatboxing, an electric piano and multi-tracked vocals. Michael Odell from The Guardian called the song "the sort of 1970s style ballad that Aaliyah's aunt, Gladys Knight, would approve of – but again it's stripped down and rebuilt with layers of haunting keyboard and lo-tech vocal percussion". According to Musicnotes, it is composed in the key of C♯ minor and is set in time signature of common time with a tempo of 52 beats per minute, while Aaliyah's vocal range spans from F♯_{3} to C♯_{5}.

Bob Waliszewski from Plugged In said the song "offers support to a guy stinging from a breakup". Emmanuel Papa of the Philippine Daily Inquirer had a similar interpretation in their analysis: "It talks about a girl trying to comfort a broken-hearted man, convincing him that she can make that man feel he's special and loved".

== Critical reception ==
Daryl Easlea from BBC praised Aaliyah's vocal performance, saying the song "would be a conventional ballad on a more obvious soul star's album. It's what Aaliyah doesn't do that make it still sound stunning – it would have been so easy to over-ladle the emoting here". Ross Scarano from Complex praised the production of "I Care 4 U", comparing it to the work of Angie Stone. He stated: "If it weren't from some low-in-the-mix beatboxing and complicated drum programming, "I Care 4 U" wouldn't register as a Timbaland production. The electric piano and extremely earnest multi-tracked vocals give off the sheen of neo-soul; this is Aaliyah doing Angie Stone". Michael Odell from The Guardian praised the song and compared it to the work of Gladys Knight.

MTV.com said "I Care 4 U", is "a slice of old-school R&B; that displays Aaliyah's sultry, fragile vocals to good advantage". Russell Baillie from The New Zealand Herald described the song as "soul-sass" and felt that "Aaliyah's voice weaves through the sparse but punchy arrangements with a mix of sultriness". Luke McManus from the Irish publication RTÉ felt that Aaliyah showcased her voice more on the song and that her newfound vocal ability matched the "brilliance of the backing tracks". In a retrospective review, Billboard, felt that "I Care 4 U" was different from other songs that had released, yet Aaliyah "demonstrates the ease with which she can slip into a neo-soul ballad – with just enough production eccentricities to establish that Timb is indeed behind the boards".

== Commercial performance ==
"I Care 4 U" helped provide heavy airplay for Aaliyah following her death on August 25, 2001, alongside singles "Rock the Boat" and "More Than a Woman". In the US, "I Care 4 U" debuted at number 75 on the Hot R&B/Hip-Hop Songs chart dated June 1, 2002, despite not having been released as a single yet. It peaked at number three on the chart dated September 28, spending a total of 44 weeks charting. On the Billboard Hot 100, the song peaked at number 16 on October 26; it spent a total of 20 weeks on the chart. "I Care 4 U" also charted for 20 weeks on the Radio Songs chart, peaking at number 15. It was released as a double A-side single with "Don't Worry" on April 8, 2003, as the second US single from I Care 4 U, by Blackground Records and Universal Records.

In August 2021, it was reported that Aaliyah's recorded work for Blackground (since rebranded as Blackground Records 2.0) would be re-released on physical, digital, and, for the first time ever, streaming services in a deal between the label and Empire Distribution. Aaliyah, including "I Care 4 U", was re-released on September 10. The song subsequently debuted and peaked at number 11 on the US R&B Digital Song Sales.

== Track listing ==
US 12-inch vinyl

1. "I Care 4 U" (album version) – 4:34
2. "Don't Worry" – 3:55

== Credits and personnel ==
Credits are adapted from the liner notes of Aaliyah.

- Aaliyah – vocals
- Jimmy Douglass – engineering, mixing
- Missy Elliott – writing
- Bernie Grundman – mastering
- Timbaland – production, writing

== Charts ==
=== Weekly charts ===
2002 weekly chart performance for "I Care 4 U"
Chart	Peak position
US Billboard Hot 100	16
US Hot R&B/Hip-Hop Songs (Billboard)	3

2021 weekly chart performance for "I Care 4 U"
Chart	Peak position
US R&B Digital Song Sales (Billboard)	11

=== Year-end charts ===
2002 year-end chart performance for "I Care 4 U"
Chart	Position
US Hot R&B/Hip-Hop Songs (Billboard)	24

2003 year-end chart performance for "I Care 4 U"
Chart	Position
US Hot R&B/Hip-Hop Songs (Billboard)	76
