= Miss You (Aaliyah song) =

2002 single by Aaliyah

- North American editions cover

Single by Aaliyah

from the album I Care 4 U
- B-side: "We Need a Resolution"; "One in a Million"; "At Your Best (You Are Love)"
- Released: October 28, 2002
- Recorded: 1999
- Studio: Sony (New York City)
- Genre: R&B; pop
- Length: 4:05
- Label: Blackground; Universal
- Songwriters: Johntá Austin; Teddy Bishop; Elgin Baylor Lumpkin
- Producer: Teddy Bishop

Aaliyah singles chronology
"More Than a Woman" (2001)	"Miss You" (2002)	"Don't Know What to Tell Ya" (2003)

Audio sample
- A 24-second sample of "Miss You": file; help

Music video
- "Miss You" on YouTube

Alternative cover
- International editions cover

"Miss You" is a song recorded by American singer Aaliyah. Written by Johntá Austin, Ginuwine and Teddy Bishop in 1998, the song was initially recorded in 1999 for Aaliyah's third album Aaliyah (2001). However, it did not make the final cut and remained unreleased until after Aaliyah's death in 2001. It was then included on the posthumous compilation album I Care 4 U (2002) and was released as its lead single on October 28, 2002, by Blackground Records and Universal Records.

Upon its release, "Miss You" received widespread acclaim from music critics. A commercial success, it peaked at number three on the US Billboard Hot 100, becoming Aaliyah's second highest-peaking single behind her number-one hit "Try Again" (2000), and atop the Billboard Hot R&B/Hip-Hop Singles & Tracks chart. Internationally, it reached the top ten in Germany, and top 20 in Canada, Denmark, the Netherlands and Switzerland.

The accompanying music video for the song was directed by Darren Grant and featured tributes from Aaliyah's friends and collaborators, including DMX, Missy Elliott, and Tank. It was nominated for Best R&B Video at the 2003 MTV Video Music Awards. Rapper Jay-Z made a tribute to Aaliyah using the "Miss You" instrumental and chorus for its official remix, released in March 2003.

== Writing and production ==
Originally crafted for Ginuwine's second studio album 100% Ginuwine (1999), "Miss You" was written by Ginuwine, Johntá Austin and Teddy Bishop in 1998, and was produced by Bishop. In 1999, while Aaliyah was recording her third album Aaliyah (2001) at the Manhattan Center Studios, she requested Austin and Bishop to play her a couple of tracks they had produced with other artists, including "Miss You", for which Ginuwine had already lent his vocals. Bishop later commented: "She was like, 'I want to cut this record' [...] She got on the phone, called him and said 'Hey I know you cut this record already, but I would love to cut it'." Ginuwine allowed her to cut her own version of it and the same night, Aaliyah re-recorded the whole song. Although she reportedly wanted to put the song out herself, her label Blackground Records felt it was not a "smash record", thus the song was left unused until after Aaliyah's death. According to Billboard, lyrically "The verses paint it as a clear breakup song, about being left by her college-bound high-school lover — but with a more ambiguous chorus full of heart-tugging lyrics (“It’s been too long and I’m lost without you / What am I gonna do?”) and a bird-twittering background hook that sounds like the singer’s soul flying free, it’s a tearjerker anyway".

== Composition ==
Sheet music for the song shows the key of B♭ major with a suggested tempo of "moderately slow hip-hop (with a half-time feel)" at 112 beats per minute in common 4/4 time.

== Release ==
"Miss You" was first made available on October 28, 2002, for streaming via AOL's program First Listen. Blackground Records and Universal Records serviced it to contemporary hit, rhythmic contemporary, urban contemporary and urban adult contemporary radio stations in the United States on November 12, as the lead single from I Care 4 U. Jay-Z's remix of the song was serviced to urban contemporary radio on April 8, 2003, and was released as a CD single with the original version on April 29.

In August 2021, it was reported that Aaliyah's recorded work for Blackground (since rebranded as Blackground Records 2.0) would be re-released on physical, digital, and, for the first time ever, streaming services in a deal between the label and Empire Distribution. I Care 4 U and Ultimate Aaliyah, both including "Miss You", were re-released on October 8.

== Critical reception ==
John Bush from AllMusic, while mentioning the song with "All I Need", said that they "don't have the edge of her classic Timbaland productions, but they stand up well — even when they're slotted next to the best songs of her career." Oliver VanDervoort from AXS said, "This is another song that is slow and yet has a great catchy beat". Michael Paoletta from Billboard praised "Miss You", calling it "yet another showcase of a talent that was taken too soon" and adding: "The singer's breathy alto floats over a sensual, bass-heavy track, courtesy of Teddy Bishop". Damien Scott from Complex felt that the song "is a masterstroke in lovelorn yearning with Aaliyah spilling tears over a lost love. It made sense, then, that it was one of her last tracks, as it summed up the way her family, friends, and fans felt upon her passing". James Poletti from Dotmusic described the song as "deep 'n' honeyed sweetness" and felt that Aaliyah "evokes shuddering sensuality in every syllable". Laura Passero from the Hartford Courant labeled the song as a "soft ballad that highlights her sultry voice." She also felt that the lyrics, "it's been so long and I'm lost without you" in a way speaks to her death. Music Week felt that with its growing radio airplay that "this will find a ready-made audience among the late singer's fanbase". musicOMH called "Miss You" the best new song from I Care 4 U, as well as stating "poignant lyrics ... mix well with a thoughtful, reflective, laid back tune." Sal Cinquemani from Slant Magazine called the song "Aaliyah-lite".

== Accolades ==
Awards and nominations for "Miss You"
Year	Award	Category	Result	Ref.
2003	Billboard R&B/Hip-Hop Award	Top R&B/Hip-Hop Single – Airplay	Nominated	
2003	MTV Video Music Award	Best R&B Video	Nominated	

== Commercial performance ==
In the United States, "Miss You" debuted at number 55 on the Billboard Hot 100 on November 30, 2002. It peaked at number three on the chart dated April 5, 2003, becoming Aaliyah's second highest-peaking single on the chart after the number-one "Try Again" (2000), and spent a total of 30 weeks on the chart. The song also peaked atop the Hot R&B/Hip-Hop Singles & Tracks chart on January 25, spending three weeks at the summit. On the 2003 year-end charts, "Miss You" was ranked eighth on the Billboard Hot 100 and third on the Hot R&B/Hip-Hop Singles & Tracks chart. Six years after its release, on November 22, 2008, the song debuted and peaked at number 38 on the US Hot Ringtones. After the October 8, 2021 re-release of I Care 4 U and Ultimate Aaliyah, "Miss You" debuted and peaked at number five on the US R&B Digital Song Sales.

Internationally, "Miss You" was a moderate commercial success. In Canada, it peaked at number 14 in its sixth week on the Canadian Singles Chart, where it spent a total of 13 weeks. The song reached the top ten in Germany, where it debuted and peaked at number eight on January 27, 2003. It also peaked at number 15 in both Denmark and Switzerland. In the Netherlands, it peaked at number 25 on the Dutch Top 40 and number 14 on the Single Top 100. In the United Kingdom, "Miss You" debuted at number 91 on the UK Singles Chart for the week ending February 1. It peaked at number 76 in its fourth week, becoming Aaliyah's lowest-peaking single in the country.

== Music video ==
The accompanying music video for "Miss You" was directed by Darren Grant and was filmed in November 2002 in Long Island City, New York, and Los Angeles. The video includes segments from Aaliyah's previous music videos, alongside cameo appearances from Aaliyah's close friends and peers, who were shown lip-syncing to the song. Celebrities who were present at the Long Island video shoot included Missy Elliott, Lil' Kim, Tank, Tweet, Queen Latifah, Jaheim, Lyric, and Lil' Jon and the Eastside Boyz, while those present at the Los Angeles shoot included Jamie Foxx, DMX, Quincy Jones and Ananda Lewis. In the UK, the video was made available to stream online a week before the release of "I Care 4 U" starting on January 31, 2003 via Dotmusic's website.

== Track listings and formats ==
US CD single

1. "Miss You" – 4:04
2. "Miss You" (remix featuring Jay-Z) – 4:09

UK CD single

1. "Miss You" – 4:04
2. "We Need a Resolution" (featuring Timbaland) – 4:04

Belgian, Dutch and Luxembourgish CD single

1. "Miss You" – 4:04
2. "Miss You" (music video) – 4:17

European CD single

1. "Miss You" – 4:04
2. "One in a Million" – 4:30

European maxi CD single

1. "Miss You" – 4:04
2. "One in a Million" – 4:30
3. "At Your Best (You Are Love)" – 4:49

== Credits and personnel ==
Credits are adapted from the liner notes of I Care 4 U.

- Aaliyah – vocals
- Johntá Austin – writing
- Teddy Bishop – production, writing
- Ginuwine – writing
- Acar Keys – mixing, recording

== Charts ==
=== Weekly charts ===
Chart (2002–2003)	Peak position
Austria (Ö3 Austria Top 40)	29
Belgium (Ultratop 50 Flanders)	43
Belgium (Ultratip Bubbling Under Wallonia)	7
Canada (Nielsen SoundScan)	14
Denmark (Tracklisten)	15
Europe (European Hot 100 Singles)	35
Germany (GfK)	8
Netherlands (Dutch Top 40)	25
Netherlands (Single Top 100)	14
Poland (Polish Airplay Charts)	23
Sweden (Sverigetopplistan)	40
Switzerland (Schweizer Hitparade)	15
UK Singles (OCC)	76
UK Hip Hop/R&B (OCC)	15
US Billboard Hot 100	3
US Hot R&B/Hip-Hop Songs (Billboard)	1
US Pop Airplay (Billboard)	10
US Rhythmic Airplay (Billboard)	6
US Top 40 Tracks (Billboard)	8

Chart (2021)	Peak position
US R&B Digital Song Sales	5

=== Year-end charts ===
Chart (2003)	Position
Netherlands (Dutch Top 40)	179
US Billboard Hot 100	8
US Hot R&B/Hip-Hop Singles & Tracks (Billboard)	3
US Mainstream Top 40 (Billboard)	62
US Rhythmic Top 40 (Billboard)	20

== Release history ==
Release dates and formats for "Miss You"
Region	Date	Version(s)	Format(s)	Label(s)	Ref.
United States	October 28, 2002	Original	Streaming	Blackground; Universal	
United States	November 12, 2002	Original	Contemporary hit radio; rhythmic contemporary radio; urban adult contemporary radio; urban contemporary radio	Blackground; Universal	
Germany	January 13, 2003	Original	CD; maxi CD	Edel	
United Kingdom	January 27, 2003	Original	CD	Independiente	
Belgium	February 7, 2003	Original	CD	Universal Music	
Luxembourg	February 7, 2003	Original	CD	Universal Music	
Netherlands	February 7, 2003	Original	CD	Universal Music	
United States	April 8, 2003	Remix	Urban contemporary radio	Blackground; Universal	
United States	April 29, 2003	Original; remix	CD	Blackground; Universal	
Canada	April 29, 2003	Original; remix	CD	Universal	

== See also ==
- List of Hot R&B/Hip-Hop Singles & Tracks number ones of 2003
