= Ultimate Aaliyah =

Box set by Aaliyah
- Released: April 4, 2005
- Recorded: 1993–March 9, 2001
- Studios: Manhattan Center; Sony (New York City); Pyramid (Ithaca); Chicago Recording Company (Chicago); Spectrum (Greensboro); Larrabee; Magic Mix; Music Grinder; The Village; Westlake (Los Angeles)
- Genres: R&B; pop; hip hop
- Length: 185:39
- Label: Blackground
- Producers: Bud'da; Teddy Bishop; Irv Gotti; Vincent Herbert; Kevin Hicks; R. Kelly; Craig King; Lil Rob; Grant Nelson; Rapture; Donnie Scantz; Eric Seats; Daryl Simmons; Timbaland

Aaliyah chronology
I Care 4 U (2002)	Ultimate Aaliyah (2005)	Unstoppable (TBA)

Singles from Ultimate Aaliyah
- 1. "Are You Feelin' Me?" Released: 2005

Ultimate Aaliyah is a posthumous box set and second posthumous album overall by American singer Aaliyah. It was released in selected countries on April 4, 2005, by Blackground Records. The box set consists of three discs–the first disc is a greatest hits collection, the second, entitled Are You Feelin' Me?, contains material from soundtracks and Timbaland's studio albums, while the third is a DVD with the documentary The Aaliyah Story.

Ultimate Aaliyah received generally favorable reviews from critics. Due to its limited release, it peaked at number 32 on the UK Albums Chart and sold only 75,000 copies worldwide. The song "Are You Feelin' Me?", previously included on the Romeo Must Die soundtrack (2000), was released as a single in the United Kingdom to promote the album but failed to chart. Following its global release on October 8, 2021, Ultimate Aaliyah debuted at number 41 on the US Billboard 200.

== Release ==
Ultimate Aaliyah was released in France and the United Kingdom on April 4, 2005 and in Australia on May 2. Unlike Aaliyah's previous releases, Ultimate Aaliyah was released independently by Blackground Records, without the involvement of a major label. The album consists of three discs–two CDs and a DVD featuring the 60-minute documentary The Aaliyah Story compiled of promo clips, interviews, and special features, including MTV special, MTV News Now: The Life of Aaliyah, a Tribute to Aaliyah, Aaliyah's VH1 Behind the Music installment, and her E! True Hollywood Story episode. In Japan, a CD+DVD compilation album titled Special Edition: Rare Tracks & Visuals was released on March 14 instead of Ultimate Aaliyah.

In 2017, a company named Craze Productions leaked the album on streaming services for 18 hours, and within minutes, Ultimate Aaliyah skyrocketed to number four on the iTunes charts. Hours later, the album was taken down off sites by Aaliyah's uncle and manager Barry Hankerson, and a lawsuit to Craze Productions was filed. The same company earlier issued her previous compilation album I Care 4 U (2002) digitally, for which it was sued by Reservoir Media Management, the last company managing Blackground Records' catalog.

In August 2021, it was reported that the album (minus the DVD) and Aaliyah's other recorded work for Blackground (since rebranded as Blackground Records 2.0) would be re-released on physical, digital and, for the first time ever, streaming services, in a deal between the label and Empire Distribution; Ultimate Aaliyah was released on October 8. It also marked the first time the album was available globally, as the album had previously been released only in Australia, France and the United Kingdom. The re-release was met with disdain from Aaliyah's estate, who issued a statement denouncing the "unscrupulous endeavor to release Aaliyah's music without any transparency or full accounting to the estate".

== Critical reception ==
Professional ratings
Review scores
Source	Rating
AllMusic	4.5/5 stars
The Encyclopedia of Popular Music	3/5 stars

Ultimate Aaliyah received generally favorable reviews from critics. Andy Kellman of AllMusic gave the album four and a half stars out of five, stating: "From the delightful "Back and Forth" through the all-too-sobering "Miss You," Ultimate Aaliyah adequately represents the shortened career of a tremendous talent who benefited from some of the best songwriting and production work by Timbaland, Missy Elliott, and R. Kelly. Casual fans will get most of the hits; collectors will be pleased to plug some gaps and get the documentary as a bonus." In the Encyclopedia of Popular Music's 5th Concise edition (2007), writer Colin Larkin gave the album three out of five stars.

== Commercial performance ==
Ultimate Aaliyah debuted at number 32 on the UK Albums Chart and number 13 on the UK R&B Albums Chart, with 20,000 copies sold. In October 2011, it was awarded a gold certification from the Independent Music Companies Association (IMPALA), indicating sales in excess of 75,000 copies.

Following its 2021 reissue, Ultimate Aaliyah reached a new peak at number eight on the UK R&B Albums Chart and debuted at number 41 on the US Billboard 200. Following the release of the vinyl version of the album in the UK, on 23 September 2022 the compilation charted at number three on the UK R&B Albums Chart (a new peak), and number 27 on the UK Vinyl Albums Chart Top 40.

== Track listing ==
Ultimate Aaliyah – Disc one: Greatest Hits
No.	Title	Writer(s)	Producer(s)	Length
1.	"One in a Million"	Missy Elliott; Timothy Mosley	Timbaland	4:30
2.	"If Your Girl Only Knew"	Elliott; Mosley	Timbaland	4:50
3.	"Hot Like Fire"	Elliott; Mosley	Timbaland	4:23
4.	"The One I Gave My Heart To"	Diane Warren	Daryl Simmons	4:30
5.	"Got to Give It Up" (featuring Slick Rick)	Marvin Gaye; Slick Rick	Herbert; Craig King	4:41
6.	"4 Page Letter"	Elliott; Mosley	Timbaland	4:52
7.	"We Need a Resolution" (featuring Timbaland)	Stephen Garrett; Mosley	Timbaland	4:02
8.	"Rock the Boat"	Garrett	Eric Seats; Rapture Stewart	4:35
9.	"More Than a Woman"	Garrett	Timbaland	3:49
10.	"I Care 4 U"	Elliott; Mosley; Carl Hampton; Homer Banks	Timbaland	4:33
11.	"Try Again"	Garrett; Mosley	Timbaland	4:44
12.	"Back & Forth"	R. Kelly	Kelly	3:51
13.	"Are You That Somebody?"	Garrett; Mosley	Timbaland	4:30
14.	"Don't Know What to Tell Ya"	Garrett; Mosley	Timbaland	5:01
15.	"Miss You"	Johnta Austin; Teddy Bishop; Ginuwine	Bishop	4:05
16.	"At Your Best (You Are Love)"	Ronald Isley; Marvin Isley; O'Kelly Isley; Ernie Isley; Chris Jasper	Kelly	4:52
Total length:				71:48

Ultimate Aaliyah – Disc two: Are You Feelin' Me?
No.	Title	Writer(s)	Producer(s)	Length
1.	"Are You Feelin' Me?"	Elliott; Mosley	Timbaland	3:11
2.	"Messed Up"	Benjamin Bush	Seats; Rapture	3:36
3.	"Come Back in One Piece" (featuring DMX)	Garrett; Earl Simmons; Irving Lorenzo; Rob Meys; George Clinton; Bernie Worrell; William Collins	Gotti; Lil Rob	4:20
4.	"I Don't Wanna"	Austin; Jazze Pha; Donnie Scantz; Kevin Hicks	Scantz; Hicks	4:17
5.	"Man Undercover" (featuring Timbaland)	Mosley; Melvin Barcliff; Elliott	Timbaland	4:44
6.	"John Blaze" (with Missy Elliott)	Elliott; Mosley	Timbaland	4:02
7.	"I Am Music" (with Timbaland & Static Major)	Garrett; Mosley	Timbaland	4:02
8.	"More Than a Woman" (Bump & Flex club mix)	Garrett	Timbaland; Grant Nelson^{[a]}	5:30
9.	"Hold On" (Timbaland & Magoo featuring Wyclef Jean)	Mosley; Barcliff; Timothy Clayton; Wyclef Jean	Timbaland	5:05
Total length:				38:47

Ultimate Aaliyah – Disc three: The Aaliyah Story (DVD) (Note: The DVD is excluded from the 2021 reissue of Ultimate Aaliyah.)
No.	Title	Length
1.	"The Aaliyah Story"	60:00
2.	"Photo Gallery"	15:04
Total length:		75:04

Notes

- ^{^a} signifies a remixer

Samples

- "More Than a Woman" contains an uncredited sample from the Arabic song "Alouli Ansa" by Syrian singer Mayada El Hennawy (1993).
- "Don't Know What to Tell Ya" contains an uncredited sample from the Arabic song "Batwannis Beek" performed by Algerian singer Warda Al-Jazairia (1992).
- "Come Back in One Piece" contains a sample of "Sir Nose D'Voidoffunk" by Parliament, from their 1977 LP Funkentelechy vs. the Placebo Syndrome.
- "I Care 4 U" contains an uncredited sample from the song "(Too Little In Common To Be Lovers) Too Much Going To Say Goodbye", performed by The Newcomers, Written by Homer Banks and Carl Hampton.

== Personnel ==
Credits adapted from the liner notes of Ultimate Aaliyah.

- Aaliyah – lead vocals
- Carlton Batts – mastering
- Teddy Bishop – producer
- Hamish Brown – photography
- Bud'da – producer
- Jimmy Douglass – mixing, engineer
- Missy Elliott – rap, backing vocals
- Irv Gotti – producer
- Bernie Grundman – mastering
- Barry Hankerson – executive producer
- Jomo Hankerson – executive producer
- Michael Haughton – executive producer
- Vincent Herbert – producer
- Kevin Hicks – producer
- Craig Kallman – executive producer
- Craig King – producer
- Lil Rob – producer
- Grant Nelson – remixer
- Rapture – producer
- Eric Seats – producer
- Donnie Scantz – producer
- Senator Jimmy D – engineer
- Daryl Simmons – producer
- Timbaland – rap, backing vocals, producer, executive producer, mixing
- Albert Watson – photography

== Charts ==
2005 weekly chart performance for Ultimate Aaliyah
Chart (2005)	Peak position
Australian Albums (ARIA)	82
Australian Urban Albums (ARIA)	15
Scottish Albums (Official Charts)	90
UK Albums (Official Charts)	32
UK Independent Albums (Official Charts)	9
UK R&B Albums (Official Charts)	13

2021–2022 weekly chart performance for Ultimate Aaliyah
Chart (2021–2022)	Peak position
Belgian Albums (Ultratop Wallonia)	104
UK Album Downloads (Official Charts)	55
UK Independent Albums (Official Charts)	27
UK Physical Albums (OCC)	68
UK R&B Albums (Official Charts)	3
UK Vinyl Albums (OCC)	27
US Billboard 200	41
US Independent Albums (Billboard)	4
US Top R&B/Hip-Hop Albums (Billboard)	21
US Vinyl Albums (Billboard)	15

== Certifications and sales ==
Certifications and sales for Ultimate Aaliyah
Region	Certification	Certified units/sales
New Zealand (RMNZ)	Gold	7,500^{‡}
United Kingdom (BPI)	Silver	60,000^{‡}
^{‡} Sales+streaming figures based on certification alone.

== Release history ==
Release dates and formats for Ultimate Aaliyah
Region	Date	Format(s)	Label(s)	Ref.
France	April 4, 2005	Double CD+DVD	Blackground	
United Kingdom	April 4, 2005	Double CD+DVD	Blackground	
Australia	May 2, 2005	Double CD+DVD	Blackground	
Various	October 8, 2021	Digital download; double CD; streaming	Blackground; Empire	
Various	September 16, 2022	Vinyl	Blackground; Empire	
