= Elijah Connor =

American singer/songwriter, actor (born 1990)

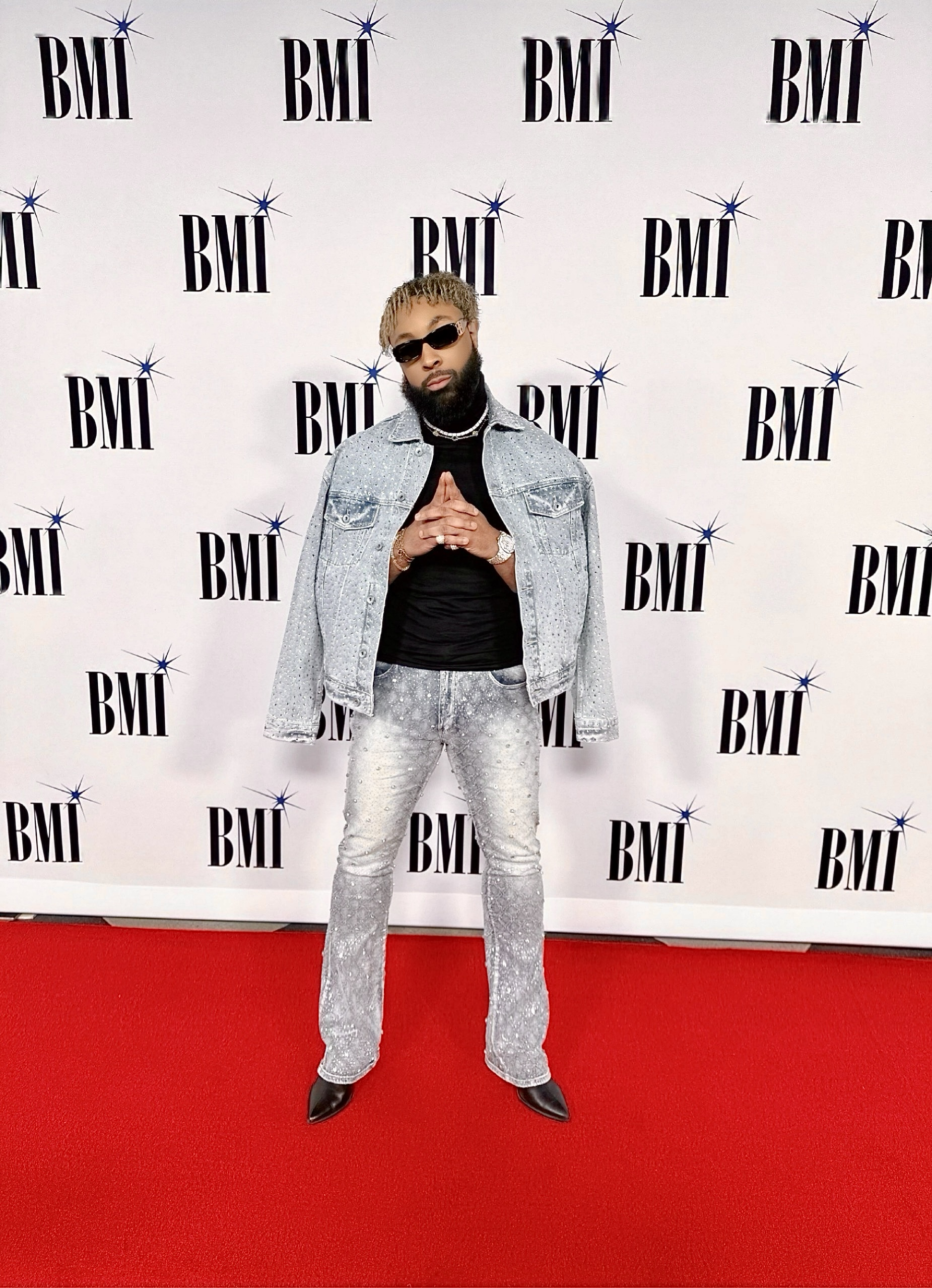
- Elijah Connor in 2024

Background information
- Also known as: Eli Connor
- Born: Elijah Frederick Harry Connor; Detroit, Michigan, United States
- Genres: R&B, Pop, soul,
- Occupations: Singer, songwriter, television personality, actor, entrepreneur
- Instruments: Vocals, singer-songwriter,
- Years active: 2013–present
- Labels: Purple Rain Entertainment, CKI, AWAL

Elijah Connor is an American pop singer and songwriter. He is known for starring in season two of The Four: Battle for Stardom on Fox with Sean Combs.

== Career ==
Connor was born in Detroit, Michigan, and had a role on Donald Trump's reality television series The Ultimate Merger. He landed a minor role in the movie Sparkle starring Whitney Houston, Mike Epps, and Jordin Sparks. He played himself in the NBC/Oxygen drama series Player Gets Played.

In October 2021, Connor signed with Blackground Records 2.0. In February 2022, Connor left Blackground Records 2.0. and legally ended their business relationship, after only being there for 5 months.

In 2023, Connor starred in the WE TV show Grown & Gospel which is described as a "reality TV docuseries" about six friends from Detroit who are children of successful preachers and gospel singers. Although they have prominent backgrounds, they are pursuing their own paths to success.

== Early life ==
Connor graduated from Oakland County's Farmington High School. While majoring in medicine in college, he worked as a print and runway model for Sears and Armani.

Connor is the younger cousin to musician Prince.

== Discography ==
=== Singles ===
Year	Song	U.S. Peak R&B Billboard
2013	"This Christmas"	
2018	"Mill Ticket" (featuring Tee Grizzley)	
2019	"Reputation"	
2020	"Say The Word"	
2021	"Lemon & Lime"	
2023	"Appetite"	
2024	"Worth It"	24
