= Blackhawk International Airways =

US aircraft charter rental and leasing company

Blackhawk International Airways was an aircraft charter rental and leasing company based in Florida, United States. Blackhawk was owned and founded by Gilbert Chacón and his son Erik. The small charter and tour business, which eventually moved to a small office next to the Lantana Airport, was at one time based at Fort Lauderdale Executive Airport.

In 2001, Blackhawk surrendered its operating certificate to the Federal Aviation Administration (FAA) and subsequently closed down in 2003.

== FAA issues ==
Between 1998 and 2001, Blackhawk was fined by the FAA four times, including once for violating safety standards and once for failing to comply with maintenance standards. A third charge in 1999 particularly took the company to task for failing to test its employees for illegal drug use.

== Death of Aaliyah ==
Nine people were killed in a Cessna 402B (N8097W) crash on August 25, 2001 around 6:50 pm local time at Marsh Harbour, Abaco Islands, The Bahamas. The nine killed included American R&B singer Aaliyah, 22, bodyguard Scott Gallin, 41, makeup artist Christopher Maldonado, 32, hairstylists Eric Forman, 29, and Anthony Dodd, 34, Virgin Records label video production director Douglas Kratz, 28, and Blackground Records label executives Gina Smith, 29, and Keith Wallace, 49, along with the pilot Luis Morales III, 30. Investigators discovered that the pilot, Luis Morales III, was unlicensed at the time of the crash and had traces of cocaine and alcohol in his system. Bound for Opa-locka Airport, just northwest of Miami, the aircraft was extremely overloaded at the time of takeoff and exploded on impact just 200 feet beyond the end of the airport runway. Aaliyah's family later filed a wrongful death lawsuit against Blackhawk International Airways, which was settled out of court. Blackhawk was listed in Customs documents as the official operator while Skystream was the plane's owner. Blackhawk was shut down by the FAA as a result.
