= Batwanes Beek =

Egyptian song

Song by Warda
- Language: Egyptian Arabic
- Genre: Egyptian music
- Label: Alam El Phan (Cairo)
- Composer: Salah El Sharnouby
- Lyricist: Omar Battisha

Batwanes Beek (Egyptian Arabic: بتونس بيك) is an Egyptian song, performed by Warda in the 1990s. The music is composed by Salah El Sharnouby, and the lyrics are by Omar Battisha.

== In popular culture ==
In 2002, "Batwanes Beek" was sampled in "Don't Know What to Tell Ya" by American singer Aaliyah. Produced by Timbaland for her eponymous third studio album (2001), However, it did not make the final cut for Aaliyah and remained unreleased until after Aaliyah's August 25, 2001 death. The song was then included on the posthumous compilation album I Care 4 U.

In 2022, the Egyptian hit was used as an intro song of one of Moon Knight's episodes representing Cairo vibes.

In January 2023, during her performance in Dubai, American singer Beyoncé sampled "Batwanes Beek" for a musical interlude.

In 2023, two-time Eurovision winner Loreen covered the song on her Tattoo Tour.
