= More Than a Woman (Aaliyah song) =

2001 single by Aaliyah

Single by Aaliyah

from the album Aaliyah
- B-side: "I Refuse"; "One in a Million"; "Rock the Boat"
- Released: September 4, 2001
- Recorded: February–March 2001
- Studio: Manhattan Center (New York)
- Genre: Pop; electro; hip hop; funk; R&B
- Length: 3:49
- Label: Blackground; Virgin
- Songwriters: Timbaland; Stephen Garrett
- Producer: Timbaland

Aaliyah singles chronology
"Rock the Boat" (2001)	"More Than a Woman" (2001)	"Miss You" (2002)

Music video
- "More Than a Woman" on YouTube

"More Than a Woman" is a song recorded by American singer Aaliyah for her eponymous third and final studio album (2001). It was written by Static Major and Timbaland, with the latter producing it. Musically, it is a pop, electro, hip hop, funk, and R&B song, while its instrumental features digital strings, harsh-sounding synthetic bass, and guitar sounds. Lyrically, the protagonist makes promises to fulfill her love interest's desires.

Initially chosen as the second single from Aaliyah, Aaliyah began promoting "More Than a Woman" with televised performances on Live with Regis and Kelly and The Tonight Show with Jay Leno in July 2001. Due to premature radio support, "Rock the Boat" instead became the second single. After Aaliyah died in a plane crash on August 25, 2001, Blackground Records executives were uncertain about when they would issue the physical single for "More Than a Woman" and its accompanying music video. However, the song was released as the third and final single from Aaliyah on September 4, 2001, by Blackground and Virgin Records.

On release, "More Than a Woman" received generally favorable reviews from music critics, with many praising Aaliyah's vocal performance and the song's production. In the US, it achieved moderate success, peaking at number 25 on the Billboard Hot 100. Internationally, the song fared better, reaching number one in Croatia and on the UK Singles Chart, making Aaliyah the first female artist to obtain a posthumous number-one single on the latter chart. In 2003, "More Than a Woman" was nominated for Best Female R&B Vocal Performance at the 45th Annual Grammy Awards.

The accompanying music video for "More Than a Woman" was directed by Dave Meyers in early August 2001. It is a dance-heavy futuristic video that takes place inside a motorcycle engine. After its release, the video received acclaim from the music industry, winning Best Video at the 2002 MOBO Awards. Throughout the years, most critics have praised the video for its theme, fashion, and choreography.

== Background and composition ==
"More Than a Woman" was written by Stephen "Static Major" Garrett and Timothy "Timbaland" Mosley, being produced by the latter. Conceived during the recording of Aaliyah, the song was initially produced by Garrett. After recording its original version, Garrett kept going back and listening to the song, saying "I can do something bigger and better to it". Subsequently, he rewrote the whole song. Aaliyah wasn't present at the studio when Garrett recorded the original, so she never heard it.

NME writer Adam Bychawski said "More Than a Woman" was an "anthemic, 80s-tinged" song. It is composed in the key of C Major and is set in time signature of common time with a tempo of 88 beats per minute. According to Complex journalist Lauren Nostro it mixes "pop, electro, and a mesmerizing mid tempo hip-hop feel, which allowed Aaliyah's delicate vocals to take the spotlight". While, i-D journalist Emily Manning states that the song has a "daring" blend of pop and electronic influences. In a review of Aaliyah, Ian Wade from Dotmusic described the song as "Baroque liquid funk", and Jeff Lorez from Yahoo! Music described it as "breezy hip-hop/funk". Harrison Brocklehust from The Tab labeled the song as R&B and declared that it was "one of the greatest R&B singles to ever be released".

Micha Frazer-Carroll from The Independent stated, "Even at her most poppy, 'More Than a Woman' includes smooth and sweet self-harmonisation amid dark, minor-key strings". Kelefah Sanneh of The New York Times said the song features an "uncharacteristically dense arrangement of digital strings, synthetic bass and lissome rhythms". According to author Tim Footman the songs rhythm is built around "an insistent motif on a Güiro – a Brazilian percussion instrument that's scraped, rather than hit or shaken". In addition to implementing a variety of sounds, it also contains an initially uncredited sample from the Egyptian song "Alouli Ansa" by singer Mayada El Hennawy.

On the song Aaliyah's vocal range spans from G♯_{3} to D♯_{5}, as she "sings breathily and economically" over the songs "grinding electronic backdrop" which also includes "a coda of dirty, squelchy synths". She makes "it look deceptively simple the way her understated vocals cut through a glitchy, complex Timbaland beat to take center stage". The song "creeps up on you, its charms gradually revealing themselves through Aaliyah's understated delivery". Lyrically, she "makes an odd promise to a lover: I'll be more than a woman" while, "professing that she "has everything her man is looking for, silencing his need to look further".

== Release and promotion ==
Having invested in the commercial performance of Aaliyah, Blackground Records and Virgin Records wanted a single with a high chart peak to help increase the album's sales. Its lead single "We Need a Resolution" (featuring Timbaland) had been released on April 13, 2001, but underperformed on radio and reached only number 59 on the US Billboard Hot 100. Originally, "More Than a Woman" was chosen as the second single; however, "Rock the Boat" began receiving heavy radio airplay. Aaliyah fought with the label and pushed for "Rock the Boat" to become the second single. Consequently, Blackground and Virgin serviced "Rock the Boat" to rhythmic contemporary radio in the United States as the second single from Aaliyah on August 21.

In August, Aaliyah filmed the accompanying music video for "More Than a Woman" in Los Angeles and then travelled to the Bahamas to film a video for "Rock the Boat". However, after its completion, she and several crew members who were returning to the US died in a plane crash on August 25. Although Blackground executives were initially uncertain when they would release the album's next single and video, In France, "More Than a Woman" was released as the second international single from the album on September 4. In January 2002, It was released in the UK as the albums second single, debuting at number 1 the week after release. In the US it was released as the airplay-only third and final single on April 30, 2002.

In August 2021, it was reported that Aaliyah's recorded work for Blackground (since rebranded as Blackground Records 2.0) would be re-released on physical, digital, and, for the first time ever, streaming services in a deal between the label and Empire Distribution. Aaliyah, including "More Than a Woman", was re-released on September 10.

=== Live performances ===
Aaliyah first performed "More Than a Woman" on Live with Regis and Kelly on July 18, 2001, to promote Aaliyah. The second and final performance of the song took place on The Tonight Show with Jay Leno on July 25; it was Aaliyah's final live performance before she died a month later. Rap-Up included her Tonight Show performance as one of her 10 greatest live performances saying, "In July 2001, Aaliyah appeared on the late-night talk show in what would be her last performance before her untimely death. And if that’s not enough of a reason to watch, let it be the flawless display of her lower register. Or her velour suit-clad band." While, Brian Lisi from New York Daily News commented on the performance saying, "Her voice delicate yet soulful, Aaliyah's "More Than a Woman" would still resonate despite the limitations of the Tonight Show stage recording."

== Critical reception ==
Brad Cawn from Chicago Tribune felt that Aaliyah had matured content-wise and described the song as being a "mid-tempo come-on". James Poletti from Dotmusic gave "More Than a Woman" a mixed review; he praised the song's production by saying it was one of Timbaland's finest productions but felt that the song was lesser compared to Aaliyah's previously released singles. Overall, he felt that the song did justice to Aaliyah's legacy and that it "reminds us that Aaliyah was a truly contemporary soul performer and will be sorely missed". Drowned in Sound writer Anita Bhagwandas gave the song a ten rating saying, "This record is not so much the best thing she’s done, rather a pertinent reminder of her ethos of pushing the boundaries and blurring the lines between the genres." Len Righi from The Morning Call, stated that "Aaliyah's sexy promises bring a dry-ice kind of heat to "More Than a Woman".

Music Week, gave the song a mixed review, as they felt that the song wasn't the best cut from Aaliyah's album, however they praised its Masters at Work remix calling it "particularly good"; nonetheless they declared "her talent continues to shine through". When reviewing Aaliyah, British publication NME described "More Than a Woman" as being "grandiose". Quentin B. Huff from PopMatters praised the production of the song by saying: "The production bumps and jerks, contrasting a smooth groove with the spikes and dips of its loops and cadences". He also felt that "Aaliyah manages to croon over this mechanical bull of a beat, and the lyrics are appropriately terse and frugal, as if she only needs a few key phrases to remind her significant other that she is in fact "more than enough for you."

In a review of Aaliyah, Luke McManus from the Irish publication RTÉ compared "More Than a Woman" to the work of French electronic music duo Daft Punk and praised her vocal performance. Sal Cinquemani from Slant Magazine felt that the song would make the perfect cartoon theme song, stating: "If the beyond-burgeoning actress was ever approached to play a cartoon superhero, the synth-heavy "More Than a Woman", with its millennium-ready empowerment and sensitive vocals, would make the perfect theme song for the fictional vixen ("You go, I go/'Cause we share pillows")". Joshua Clover from Spin praised the song by saying: "'More Than a Woman' isn't the Bee Gees song but pushes the jumpy tune until, finally, it meets you in the doorway (or is that the dance floor or the bed room?)". Variety writers labeled the song as timeless and felt that its influence could be heard in various songs such as Kehlani’s "Too Much" (2017) and Ari Lennox’s "BMO" (2019).

== Accolades ==
Awards and nominations for "More Than a Woman"
Year	Award	Category	Result	Ref.
2002	Teen Choice Award	Choice Music – R&B/Hip-Hop Song	Nominated	
2002	MOBO Award	Best Video	Won	
2003	Grammy Award	Best Female R&B Vocal Performance	Nominated	

Rankings for "More Than a Woman"
Year	Publication	Accolade	Rank	Ref.
2002	NME	The Top 50 Tracks of 2002	40	
2011	Rolling Stone	Ten Best Apocalyptic Dance Music Videos	–	
2015	Out	A Music Video Herstory of the All-Girl Dance Routine	–	
2020	The Guardian	The 100 Greatest UK No. 1 Singles	56	
2022	Billboard	The 100 Greatest Songs of 2002: Staff Picks	42	

== Commercial performance ==
In the United States, "More Than a Woman" entered the Billboard Hot 100 chart at number 71 on February 2, 2002. It peaked at number 25 in its ninth week, spending a total of 24 weeks on the chart. It also peaked at number 11 on Dance Club Play chart during its sixth week on the chart, while peaking at number seven on Hot R&B/Hip-Hop Singles & Tracks chart in its 24th week. On June 15, "More Than a Woman" peaked at number 19 on the Mainstream Top 40. It also peaked at number 12 on the Rhythmic Top 40 chart on April 27. "More Than a Woman" was ranked at number 58 on the 2002 year-end Billboard Hot 100. Following its 2021 digital release, "More Than a Woman" debuted and peaked at number 40 on the US Digital Song Sales chart for the week of September 25, 2021.

Internationally, "More Than a Woman" peaked at number 12 on the European Hot 100 Singles on January 26. In Belgium, "More Than a Woman" peaked at number ten on the Ultratip chart in Flanders, as well as at number 31 on the Ultratop 50 in Wallonia. In France, the song was released as a double A-side single with "I Refuse", peaking at number 25. In Germany, the song peaked at number 34. In Ireland, "More Than a Woman" peaked at number 13 on January 31. In the Netherlands, it entered the Dutch Top 40 at number 33 on November 21, 2001, peaking at number 29 four weeks later. On November 10, the song peaked and spent two weeks at number 38 on the Dutch Single Top 100. In Scotland, the song peaked at number ten on January 13, 2002. The song debuted at number 25 in Switzerland on November 11, 2001, reaching it peak at number 16 in its 11th week, on January 20, 2002.

In the United Kingdom, "More Than a Woman" debuted and peaked at number one on the UK Singles Chart for the week ending date January 19, 2002, selling 32,000 copies in its first week. It became the first time that a posthumous release had taken over from another posthumous release in the country, when the song was replaced by George Harrison's "My Sweet Lord", and the first time that a woman had had a posthumous number-one single. According to the Official Charts Company (OCC), "More Than a Woman" is Aaliyah's second best-selling single in the UK, behind "Try Again". In Australia, the song peaked at number 37 on March 10.

== Music video ==
=== Background ===
The accompanying music video for "More Than a Woman" was directed by Dave Meyers and was filmed in Los Angeles in early August 2001, before the video shoot for "Rock the Boat". Choreography for the video was orchestrated by Fatima Robinson. Meyers was chosen as the director for the video when Aaliyah met him through Damon Dash. According to Meyers, "She was with Damon Dash, her boyfriend I think, or at least they were friendly. Damon was hiring me for a lot of Jay Z's videos. I think that might've been the way I got into that job. I don't remember exactly. I just remember Damon telling me I better make his girlfriend look good [laughs]".

After getting to know one another, Meyers became familiar with Aaliyah's artistic side. He explained: "I was really impressed with how balanced she was on her whole deal and really had a great understanding of all sides of the artistic equation. She was pulling tears out of magazines and sharing those with me, it was a little bit more of how she wanted to present herself and I built the world around her with the motorcycle and the lights and the dance". The budget for the video was high, which made Myers nervous because "he wanted everything to go as planned, including the light show for the video". Aaliyah, who got the budget approved for the video, also wanted to make sure the light show was included; Myers recalled Aaliyah saying "No, I want to do this right" when speaking about the budget.

=== Theme ===
The music video for "More Than a Woman" is set inside of a motorcycle engine.

The theme for the video was brainstormed at a "little" round table; some ideas drafted included the light show and the motorcycle theme. Myers stated: "I was really excited about the video so I sort of did a little roundtable. The light show was something I've been wanting to do ever since Lenny Kravitz's "Are You Gonna Go My Way", and then the motorcycle motif I think one of the younger guys had initially tossed it out there and I thought it was awesome". The motorcycle theme was taken from the ″motorcycle mania″, heavily prominent with the hip hop crew The Ruff Ryders around that time. The video's theme included a lot of metaphorical aspects, especially within the motorcycle (e.g. the energy from the dance routines is fueling the motorcycle throughout the video).

=== Fashion ===
Aaliyah wore a custom-made Chanel jumpsuit created by designer Dapper Dan in the video. Aaliyah's stylist Derek Lee stated: "Aaliyah looked so good in a catsuit and we wanted it to be designer. He took the idea and he ran with it. It's pretty amazing". Meanwhile, Aaliyah's backup dancers wore faux Chanel buckle belts purchased on Canal Street, "where they would sell really random knockoff things". Their shoes were regular sneakers Lee made into Chanel ones to coordinate with their outfits. According to Emily Tan from The Boombox Aaliyah "lives up to the title of her 'More Than a Woman' visual by ditching oversized menswear and embracing a sleek look", when discussing her Chanel catsuit. Teen Vogue writer Shama Nasinde included her white catsuit look on their "Aaliyah’s Style Evolution: See Her Most Timeless and Influential Looks" list. While comparing Aaliyah's similar jumpsuit look from a live performance, Héloïse Salessy from Vogue France said "it was really the white model she wore in her music video for "More Than A Woman" released in 2001 that made her mark on the fashion scene".

=== Synopsis ===
The video starts with a shot of West 4th Street in Los Angeles, looking towards the Westin Bonaventure Hotel and Aaliyah riding a 2001 model Triumph Speed Triple, wearing a helmet and a Dainese jumpsuit. The camera zooms inside the exhaust pipe and shows Aaliyah dancing in a white Chanel catsuit with other female dancers between the pistons. Between cuts, she is seen riding the motorcycle and doing wheelies, and in another scene standing in front of a headlight with her back against the camera. Later in the video, the video shifts to a higher, nightclub-styled floor of the motorcycle above the pistons, where Aaliyah is wearing leather pants, gloves, and boots and a black tank-top, and dances with co-ed dancers. British music producer Mark Ronson appears in the club as a DJ, along with then-girlfriend Rashida Jones and her sister Kidada Jones. Various dancers are then shown dancing across the floor, culminating in Aaliyah and the female dancers doing a towel dance at the end of the song. At the end, Aaliyah is seen on the motorcycle, removing her helmet. The final shot is a silhouette of her in front of sunrise with the words "In Loving Memory of Aaliyah" above.

=== Release and reception ===
In the UK the music video for "More Than a Woman" became available to stream online via Dotmusic's website on January 7, 2002. On January 12 the video made its television debut on CD:UK, while the following day it debuted on The Pepsi Chart and on MTV UK as the fourth most played video. On January 18, the video made its premiere on Top of the Pops.

In the US there was an uncertainty regarding the release of the video due to Blackground ending their joint deal with Virgin in November 2001. The delay in the videos release angered fans of Aaliyah with one fan saying: "It's very important to keep her memory alive, It would behoove them to go ahead and release it quickly." While the videos release remained in limbo the public was able to see excerpts from it during her VH1 "Behind the Music" special, which aired on January 5. Eventually, Blackground obtained a deal with Universal and the video made its television debut on BET, MTV, and VH1 during the week ending January 14, 2002. During the week ending February 3, the video was the second most-played video on BET. For the week ending February 24, the video was the 26th most-played video on MTV.

Quentin B. Huff from PopMatters compared the video to the work of both Michael Jackson and Janet Jackson, saying: "Aaliyah's dancing in her videos probably owed a debt to the videos for Michael and Janet Jackson's solo work. No doubt that's true of many artists. Actually, the "More Than a Woman" video brings to mind Michael and Janet's "Scream" video, as well as Janet's video for "Rhythm Nation." He also praised her dancing in the video for being "effortless". Rolling Stone praised the video "for adding a touch of vibrant color to its futuristic factory setting". Les Fabian Brathwaite from Out felt that this was "maybe" Aaliyah's best video; He also praised the videos wardrobe styling and choreography. BET said that Aaliyah was "glowing in the video" and that it included "her signature sexy-cool dance sequences". While discussing the video, Nylon writer Steffanee Wang felt that "with the 2000s came the music video industry's obsession with surreal, sometimes absurd, cyber-future plot points; like this one, which takes place entirely inside a motorcycle's engine".

== Legacy ==
Singer Solange interpolated the chorus of "More Than a Woman" in her song "Borderline (An Ode to Self Care)" from her third studio album A Seat at the Table (2016). In 2017, Welsh musician Kelly Lee Owens covered "More Than a Woman" in two different versions. The tracks were released on a limited-edition 12-inch vinyl and were made available via SoundCloud. Owens stated: "My love and respect for Aaliyah as an artist/vocalist and Timbaland as a producer increased tenfold as I picked the track apart and understood how intricate and layered everything was", adding: "The remix of my cover was something I wanted to write and produce that gave the original track new life, and also gave people a sense of power — it’s unapologetic." American singer Kehlani interpolated "More Than a Woman" on the song "Too Much" from her debut studio album SweetSexySavage (2017). Canadian rapper Drake interpolated the opening verse of "More Than a Woman" into the song "Is There More" from his fifth studio album Scorpion (2018).

== Track listings and formats ==
International maxi CD single

1. "More Than a Woman" (album version) – 3:48
2. "More Than a Woman" (Bump n' Flex club mix) – 5:28
3. "More Than a Woman" (Masters at Work main mix) – 8:47
4. "More Than a Woman" (music video) – 3:43

European CD single

1. "More Than a Woman" (album version) – 3:47
2. "One in a Million" – 4:30

European maxi CD single

1. "More Than a Woman" (album version) – 3:47
2. "More Than a Woman" (Bump N' Flex club mix) – 5:29
3. "One in a Million" – 4:30
4. "More Than a Woman" (music video) – 3:43

European 12-inch vinyl

1. "More Than a Woman" (album version) – 3:47
2. "More Than a Woman" (instrumental) – 3:47
3. "More Than a Woman" (Bump N' Flex club mix) – 5:29
4. "More Than a Woman" (Bump N' Flex dub mix) – 5:07

UK 12-inch vinyl and cassette single

1. "More Than a Woman" (album version) – 3:48
2. "More Than a Woman" (Bump N' Flex club mix) – 5:28
3. "More Than a Woman" (Masters at Work main mix) – 8:47

French CD single

1. "More Than a Woman" (album version) – 3:47
2. "I Refuse" – 5:57

Australian maxi CD single

1. "More Than a Woman" (radio edit) – 3:08
2. "Rock the Boat" (album version) – 4:34
3. "More Than a Woman" (Bump N' Flex club mix) – 5:28
4. "More Than a Woman" (Masters at Work main mix) – 8:47

== Credits and personnel ==
Credits are adapted from the liner notes of Aaliyah.

- Aaliyah – vocals
- Jimmy Douglass – engineering, mixing
- Steve Penny – engineering assistance
- Static Major – writing
- Timbaland – mixing, production, writing
- Michael Zainer – engineering assistance

== Charts ==
=== Weekly charts ===
Chart (2001–2002)	Peak position
Australia (ARIA)	37
Australian Club (ARIA)	31
Australian Urban (ARIA) with "Rock the Boat"	10
Austria (Ö3 Austria Top 40)	65
Belgium (Ultratip Bubbling Under Flanders)	10
Belgium (Ultratop 50 Wallonia)	31
Croatia International Airplay (HRT)	1
Europe (European Hot 100 Singles) With "I Refuse"	96
Europe (European Hot 100 Singles) solo	12
Europe (European Radio Top 50)	44
France (SNEP) with "I Refuse"	25
Germany (GfK)	34
Ireland (IRMA)	13
Netherlands (Dutch Top 40)	29
Netherlands (Single Top 100)	38
Scottish Singles Sales (Official Charts)	10
Sweden (Sverigetopplistan)	52
Switzerland (Schweizer Hitparade)	16
UK Singles (Official Charts)	1
UK Hip Hop/R&B (Official Charts)	1
UK Airplay (Music Week)	4
US Billboard Hot 100	25
US Dance Club Songs (Billboard) Richie Santana mixes	11
US Hot R&B/Hip-Hop Songs (Billboard)	7
US Pop Airplay (Billboard)	19
US Rhythmic Airplay (Billboard)	12
US Top 40 Tracks (Billboard)	19

Chart (2021)	Peak position
US R&B Digital Song Sales	5

=== Year-end charts ===
Chart (2001)	Position
Netherlands (Dutch Top 40)	198

Chart (2002)	Position
UK Singles (OCC)	86
UK Airplay (Music Week)	50
US Billboard Hot 100	58
US Hot R&B/Hip-Hop Singles & Tracks (Billboard)	33
US Mainstream Top 40 (Billboard)	86
US Rhythmic Top 40 (Billboard)	40

== Certifications ==
Region	Certification	Certified units/sales
United Kingdom (BPI)	Silver	200,000^{‡}
^{‡} Sales+streaming figures based on certification alone.

== Release history ==
Release dates and formats for "More Than a Woman"
Region	Date	Format(s)	Label(s)	Ref.
France	September 4, 2001	Maxi CD	Hostile	
France	September 25, 2001	CD	Hostile	
Germany	October 29, 2001	Maxi CD	EMI	
United Kingdom	January 7, 2002	12-inch vinyl; cassette; CD	Virgin	
Canada	February 19, 2002	Maxi CD	EMI	
Australia	February 25, 2002	Maxi CD	EMI	
United States	April 30, 2002	Contemporary hit radio; rhythmic contemporary radio	Blackground; Virgin	

== See also ==
- List of UK R&B Singles Chart number ones of 2002
- List of UK Singles Chart number ones of the 2000s
- List of posthumous number ones on the UK Singles Chart

== Bibliography ==
- Farley, Christopher John (2002). Aaliyah: More Than a Woman. Simon & Schuster. ISBN 0-7434-5566-5.
- Footman, Tim (2021). Aaliyah. Plexus Publishing Limited. ISBN 9780859657136.
- Iandoli, Kathy (2021). Baby Girl: Better Known as Aaliyah. Atria Books. ISBN 978-1982156862.
- Strong, Martin C. (November 30, 2004). The Great Rock Discography (7th ed.). Canongate Books. ISBN 1841956155.
