= Blackground Records =

American record label

Blackground Records 2.0
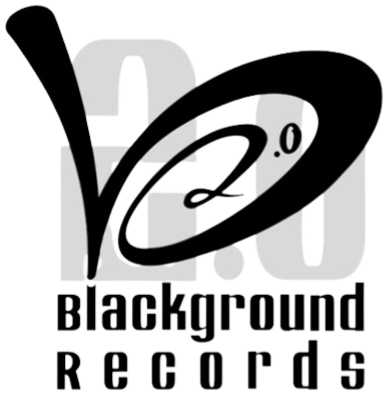
- Parent company: Universal Music Group (2001–2012)
- Founded: 1993
- Founder: Barry Hankerson; Jomo Hankerson
- Distributors: In the US: Blackground (original): Jive (1994–1996); Atlantic (1996–2000); Virgin (2000–2001); Universal (2001–2012); Interscope (2006–2012); Reservoir Media Management (2012–2019); Alternative Distribution Alliance (2025-present); Blackground 2.0: Empire Distribution (2021–present)
- Genre: R&B; hip hop; pop; rock; country; gospel
- Country of origin: United States
- Official website: https://store.blackgroundrecords.net

Blackground Records 2.0 (legal name Blackground Records, LLC, formerly known as Blackground Records, also known as Blackground Entertainment) is an American record label founded and owned by Jomo and Barry Hankerson. Initially named Blackground Enterprises, the label switched its name to Blackground Entertainment then later Blackground Records in 2000. In 2021, the label rebranded as Blackground Records 2.0, reviving its company and catalogue onto streaming services, with a partnership with Empire Distribution. It co-operated with a publishing company founded by Hankerson, named Black Fountain Music.

== History ==
=== 1993–1996: Jive Records ===
Barry Hankerson formed Blackground in 1993, as a result of unsuccessful efforts to sign his niece Aaliyah to big record labels. Using his connection with singer R. Kelly, who he managed at the time, Hankerson obtained a contract with Jive to distribute the release of Aaliyah's debut album Age Ain't Nothing but a Number.

=== 1996–2000: Atlantic Records ===
After Aaliyah and R. Kelly parted ways, Jive and Blackground agreed to terminate their contract in 1996 and Hankerson signed a lucrative distribution deal with Craig Kallman at Atlantic. Months later Aaliyah released her second studio LP, One in a Million, and Blackground signed two singing groups, Both Ends and Kashmere (their music was never released).

After positive reviews for Aaliyah's album, her producer Timbaland got his own artist deal with Blackground and in 1997 released Welcome to Our World, a collaboration album with rapper Magoo, as well as his solo album Tim's Bio: Life from da Bassment in 1998. Aaliyah's backup singer Tank also got his contract with Blackground in 1998.

=== 2000–2001: Virgin Records ===
After Atlantic contract expiration in 2000, Blackground switched over to Virgin.

Aaliyah served as an executive producer of the soundtrack to the 2000 film Romeo Must Die, in which she made her acting debut. Aaliyah contributed four songs to the soundtrack. "Try Again" was released as a single from the soundtrack; the song topped the Billboard Hot 100, making Aaliyah the first artist to top the chart based solely on airplay; this led the song to be released in a 12" vinyl and 7" single. The music video won the Best Female Video and Best Video from a Film awards at the 2000 MTV Video Music Awards. It also earned her a Grammy Award nomination for Best Female R&B Vocalist. The soundtrack went on to sell 1.5 million copies in the United States.

In 2001, after the death of Aaliyah, her self-titled and final album Aaliyah rose to #1 on the Billboard 200 becoming Blackground's first number one and best-selling album. Aaliyah sold over 13 million albums worldwide. Aaliyah's plane crash in August 2001 resulted in Blackground and Virgin parting ways a few weeks later. A new distribution deal was signed with Universal Records in December 2001.

=== 2001–2012: Universal and Interscope Records ===
Starting in 2003, Blackground's focus shifted towards pop and rock, signing predominantly white artists beginning with New England tween Joanna "JoJo" Levesque. Her self-titled debut album JoJo was released the following year, entering the Billboard 200 chart at number four and being certified platinum by the RIAA. In 2006, her sophomore album The High Road debuted at number three on the album chart and was certified gold. To date, JoJo sold over 7 million records worldwide. Her singles "Leave (Get Out)" and "Too Little Too Late" were written by Soulshock & Karlin and Billy Steinberg respectively. JoJo was involved in a years-long legal dispute with the label which began in 2009 and ended in 2014. During this time JoJo received support from her friend Taylor Swift, who referred to the Blackground situation as "fucked up" years before facing a similar battle with her label over music ownership. Out of necessity, JoJo re-recorded her out-of-print albums in 2018, while the entire Blackground catalog was added to streaming outlets in 2021.

In 2006 Blackground released the debut album Soundtrack to Your Life by former O-Town member Ashley Parker Angel, preceded by its lead single "Let U Go". A year later, the debut single "Forget You" by L.A.X. Gurlz premiered on MTV's TRL in its "First Look" segment. The song was featured on the Universal Republic Records A&R Sampler for March 2007 and was added to Top 40 and Hot AC playlists across the country. "Forget You" made the list of Billboard's 100 Greatest Girl Group Songs of All Time at #98. L.A.X. Gurlz went on a promotional tour appearing at radio stations and events including the launch of Guitar Hero III: Legends of Rock before breaking up in 2008.

In 2010, Blackground partnered with former Universal Motown Senior Vice President of Promotion Gary Marella to distribute his new label Roma Records. Their first signing was Jordy Towers, formerly known as Optimus. He is now in the band SomeKindaWonderful. Later that year, Blackground signed a new artist Crystal Nicole better known as Cri$tyle, who began her career as a songwriter and has written songs for Mariah Carey, Rihanna, Keke Palmer and many more. In June 2011, Crystal released her first single "Pinch Me", which was produced by Jermaine Dupri and Bryan Michael Cox.

=== 2012–2019: Reservoir Media Management ===
In July 2012, after its distribution deal with Interscope Records expired, Blackground signed a new contract with Reservoir Media Management. After speaking with Reservoir's CEO, Rell Lafargue, Billboard reported that Reservoir would find sync placements for Aaliyah's music to television and film, digitally re-release her music, and offer licensing of songs for sampling and cover versions. These plans were put on hold after another company, Craze Productions claimed the rights to distribution of the late artist's music. On March 20, 2013, Reservoir filed a lawsuit against Craze and in September 2015, the jury agreed that Craze illegally distributed music through online services and that the rightful distributor of Blackground Records' catalog is Reservoir Media Management. Despite the positive ruling, the promised release to streaming services did not happen, and Craze Productions continues today to illegally distribute Aaliyah's music from post-Jive years online (her recordings from Jive years are controlled by Sony Music, current owner of Jive Records). In December 2016, Complex wrote a detailed article on Blackground, Barry Hankerson and his role in the absence of Aaliyah's music. In early 2019, informations about Blackground's catalog were removed from Reservoir's official website.

On August 5, 2012, Canadian rapper Drake released "Enough Said", performed by Aaliyah featuring additional vocals provided by himself. Originally recorded prior to the singer's death in 2001, Drake later finished the track with producer "40". "Enough Said" was released by Blackground Records through their SoundCloud account on August 5, 2012. It was sent to US urban and rhythmic radio stations on August 21. The song charted at number 55 on the Billboard Hot R&B/Hip-Hop Songs.

The latest studio album release from the label was Timbaland's Shock Value II in 2009, with singles: "Morning After Dark", "Say Something", "Carry Out" and "If We Ever Meet Again".

Former Blackground artists JoJo, Toni Braxton and Tank have all released albums on Atlantic Records after leaving the label.

=== 2021–present: Blackground 2.0 and Empire ===
In August 2021, Blackground rebranded as Blackground 2.0, with Barry Hankerson remaining as founder. Blackground 2.0 signed a distribution deal with Empire Distribution, which will re-release the label's catalogue onto digital download sites and streaming services. Their catalogue was previously unavailable to streaming services, with the exception of Age Ain't Nothin' But a Number, due to the rights of that album being owned by Sony Music. Aaliyah's catalogue began its re-release in chronological order, starting with One In a Million on August 20, 2021. Her estate, run by her mother and brother Rashad, have gone on the record opposing the new deal.

On August 25, 2021, Barry Hankerson revealed in an interview with Big Tigger for WVEE that a fourth (and likely final) studio album, titled Unstoppable, would be released in "a matter of weeks". The album will feature Drake, Snoop Dogg, Ne-Yo, Chris Brown, Future and use previously unreleased vocals from before Aaliyah's passing. Hankerson shared that this will be the end of new music for the late star and added, "I think it's wonderful. It's a very emotional process to do. It's very difficult to hear her sing when she's not here, but we got through it." In the same interview, Hankerson revealed that Beyoncé helped Aaliyah write songs towards the end of her life, adding, "I'm a fan of hers, Aaliyah was a fan of hers". After the album's re-release, Aaliyah re-entered the UK Official Hip Hop and R&B Albums Chart Top 40 at number seven and reentered the US Billboard 200 chart at number 13, charting at number four for high pure sales. In celebration of the reissue, Blackground released an animated commercial titled "It's Been A Long Time" (in a similar style to the album's original 2001 commercial), directed by Takahiro Tanaka, showing Aaliyah resurrecting her music from out of a large underground vault. As of 2023, the Unstoppable album has yet to be released, with no announcement at all from Blackground Records 2.0.

In October 2021, Billboard revealed through an article that Blackground Records' first signee, Autumn Marini, would be releasing her debut single "Drive" on November 12, 2021. Additionally, Blackground introduced their latest artist, Elijah Connor. BR2.0's latest signing Miracle King released her debut single "My Dawg" featuring G Herbo on May 20, 2022.

On December 14, 2021, it was announced that a new single would be released by Aaliyah, featuring The Weeknd. The mid-tempo track, "Poison", was released on December 17, 2021. Blackground Records 2.0 and Empire tweeted a puzzle to reveal the single's cover art. Following the release of the single, Barry Hankerson told Billboard: "Everything I do at Blackground is always with Aaliyah in my heart and in my mind. God knows Aaliyah and I spent a lot of time talking about music. I think she would be very happy with the selections we made and the guests because the artists themselves made it known to us how much they wanted to work with her and be a part of her legacy. And I pray that she is happy. Aaliyah would love hearing herself with the current stars of the industry that she cared so much about. And that’s all I wanted to do." On January 16, 2024, what would have been Aaliyah's 45th birthday, Blackground's social media announced that Unstoppable was coming soon.

On May 2, 2025, Blackground Records 2.0 released the single "Gone", by Aaliyah, with former collaborator Tank. The single was released exclusively to the record label's streaming app, BLKStream, but saw a wider release to streaming and digital download sites on August 1, 2025. "Gone" peaked at number seven on the Adult R&B Airplay Chart, and at number 28 on the R&B/Hip Hop Airplay chart. A 2D music video was released on August 1, 2025, along with the announcement of a "3D holographic experience" provided by the Meta Quest app Soapbox Tank made a statement following the release. He wrote, "[The song] featuring myself was supposed to be something good to preserve and continue the legacy of the amazing Aaliyah… This is not it. I’m out [...] The Aaliyah song you are hearing featuring myself, I did out of love for her. I had concerns and I expressed them. From the track to the vocals to the mix and to the visual [...] I still went forward knowing I would at least be able to approve the final products. I haven’t approved one thing you’ve heard or seen [...] Me thinking people had changed was my mistake and I own it [...] Aaliyah deserves better". As of 2025, Unstoppable has not been released, with no track listing, cover art, or release date so far announced.

In March 2026, Legacy Publishing company acquired the back catalog of Blackground Records. According to the press announcement, Legacy Publishing seeks "to reinvigorate these works through strategic partnerships, innovative capital structures and proactive asset management."

== Notable artists ==
Act	Years on the label	Releases under the label	Notes
Aaliyah	1993–2001	3	
Timbaland	1996–2012	3	
Timbaland & Magoo	1996–2005	3	
Tank	1997–2009	3	
Toni Braxton	2003–2007	1	
JoJo	2003–2013	2	
Ashley Parker Angel	2004–2008	1	
Tyra B	2003–2008	—	
Rasheeda	2002–2006	—	
The Trak Starz	2005–2008	—	
Missez	2004–2008	—	
Lil Eazy-E	2005–2010	—	
Smitty	2008–2012	—	
J. Lewis	2009–2012	—	
Crystal Nicole	2010–2012	—	
Amsterdam	2010–2013	—	
Elijah Connor	2021–2022	—	
Sean Garrett	2024–present	—	

== Discography ==
Year	Title	Artist	US Sales (based on RIAA certifications)	Billboard 200 (Peak)
1994	Age Ain't Nothing but a Number	Aaliyah	2 million	18
1996	One in a Million	Aaliyah	2 million	10 (Note: After the album's release in 1996, One in a Million reached a peak of number 18 on the US Billboard 200. After its 2021 rerelease, the album reached a new peak of number 10 on the chart.)
1997	Welcome to Our World	Timbaland & Magoo	1 million	33
1998	Tim's Bio: Life from da Bassment	Timbaland	-	50
2000	Romeo Must Die	Various Artists	1 million	3
2001	Aaliyah	Aaliyah	2 million	1
2001	Exit Wounds	Various Artists	-	8
2001	Force of Nature	Tank	500,000	7
2001	Indecent Proposal	Timbaland & Magoo	-	29
2002	I Care 4 U	Aaliyah	1 million	3
2002	One Man	Tank	-	20
2003	Under Construction, Part II	Timbaland & Magoo	-	50
2004	JoJo	JoJo	1 million	4
2005	Libra	Toni Braxton	500,000	4
2005	Ultimate Aaliyah	Aaliyah	-	41 (Note: Ultimate Aaliyah was not originally released in the US in 2005. When Aaliyah's discography was rereleased in 2021, the album charted in the country for the first time, peaking at number 41 on the Billboard 200.)
2006	Soundtrack to Your Life	Ashley Parker Angel	-	5
2006	The High Road	JoJo	500,000	3
2007	Shock Value	Timbaland	1 million	5
2007	Sex, Love & Pain	Tank	-	2
2009	Shock Value II	Timbaland	-	
