= 2001 Marsh Harbour Cessna 402 crash =

Bahamian plane crash

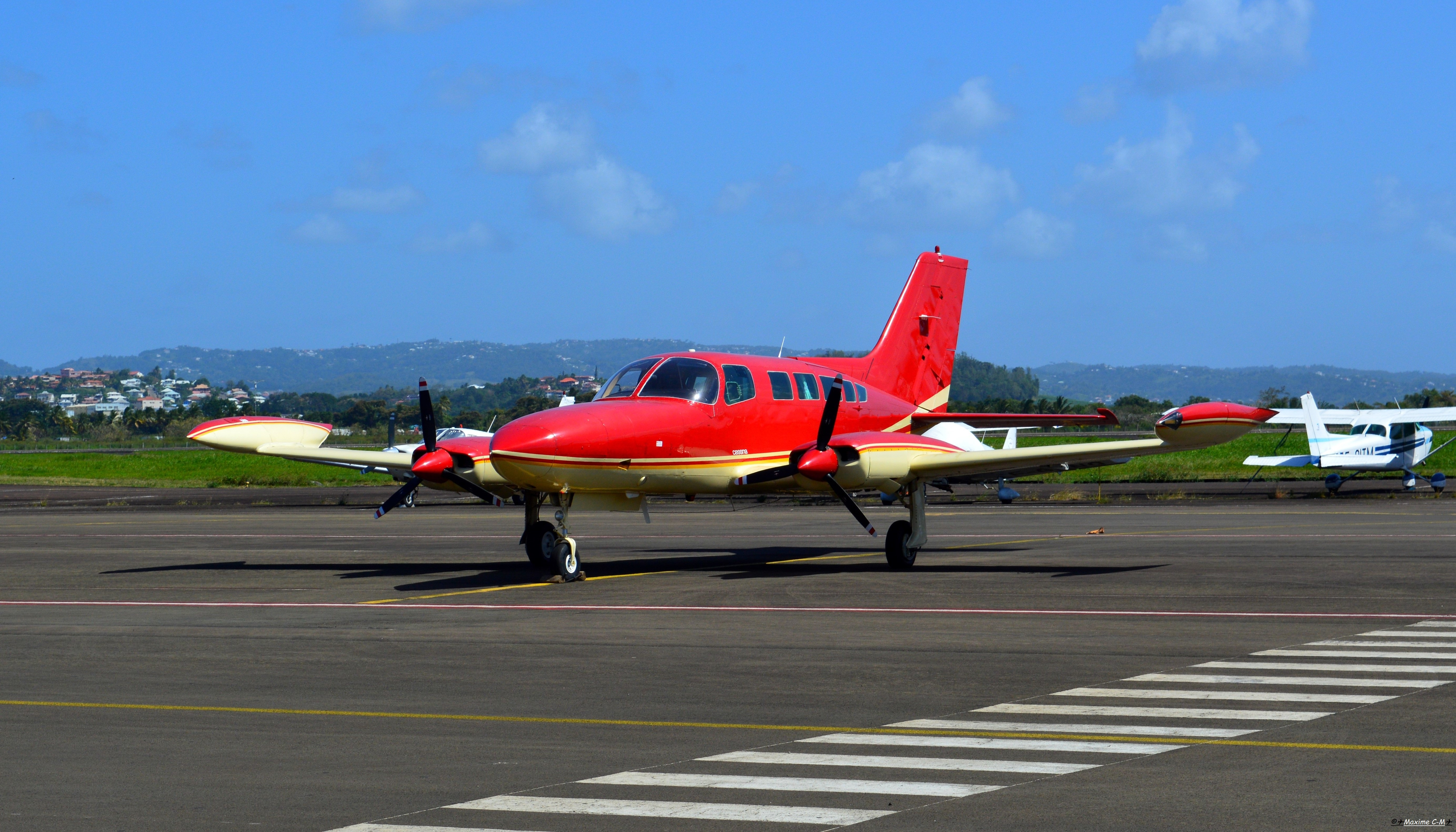
- A late model Cessna 402B similar to the accident aircraft

Accident
- Date: August 25, 2001
- Summary: Crashed shortly after takeoff due to overloading
- Site: Marsh Harbour Airport, Abaco Islands, The Bahamas; 26°30′35″N 077°05′51″W

Aircraft
- Aircraft type: Cessna 402B
- Operator: Blackhawk International Airways
- Registration: N8097W
- Flight origin: Marsh Harbour Airport, Abaco Islands, The Bahamas
- Destination: Opa-Locka Airport, Miami, Florida, U.S.
- Occupants: 9
- Passengers: 8
- Crew: 1
- Fatalities: 9
- Survivors: 0

On August 25, 2001, a Cessna 402 twin-engine light aircraft crashed shortly after takeoff from Marsh Harbour Airport on the Abaco Islands of the Bahamas, killing the pilot and all eight passengers on board. Among the victims were American singer and actress Aaliyah and members of her entourage, including a hairdresser, her bodyguard and a record executive. The group had just completed filming of the music video for "Rock the Boat" and had chartered the flight to return to Florida.

The subsequent investigation determined the aircraft had attempted to take off while heavily overloaded, and also held eight passengers exceeding its certified maximum of seven. It also emerged that the pilot falsified records on his experience and qualifications to fly this type of aircraft.

== Background ==
Appearing on BET's 106 & Park on August 21, 2001, Aaliyah announced that shooting of the video for the single "Rock the Boat", to be directed by Hype Williams, would begin the following day. Nearly sixty people worked on the video in the Bahamas. On August 22, Aaliyah travelled to Miami, Florida, and filmed dance routines backed by a green screen during the day, with underwater shots for the video in the evening. On August 23, Aaliyah and employees of Virgin Records America flew to the Bahamas on two flights using a Fairchild Metro III, chartered through Sky Limo. She was scheduled to leave the Bahamas on August 26, but chose to leave the day before since she had finished early. Williams recalled, "Aaliyah left mid-production, so we were still shooting when she left."

The New York Post printed one of the last photographs taken of Aaliyah, when the singer posed with a fan. The Post wrongly labeled the photo as having been taken shortly before the flight departed and crashed. It was later determined the photo was in fact taken when Aaliyah arrived in the Bahamas on Thursday, August 23.

== Accident ==
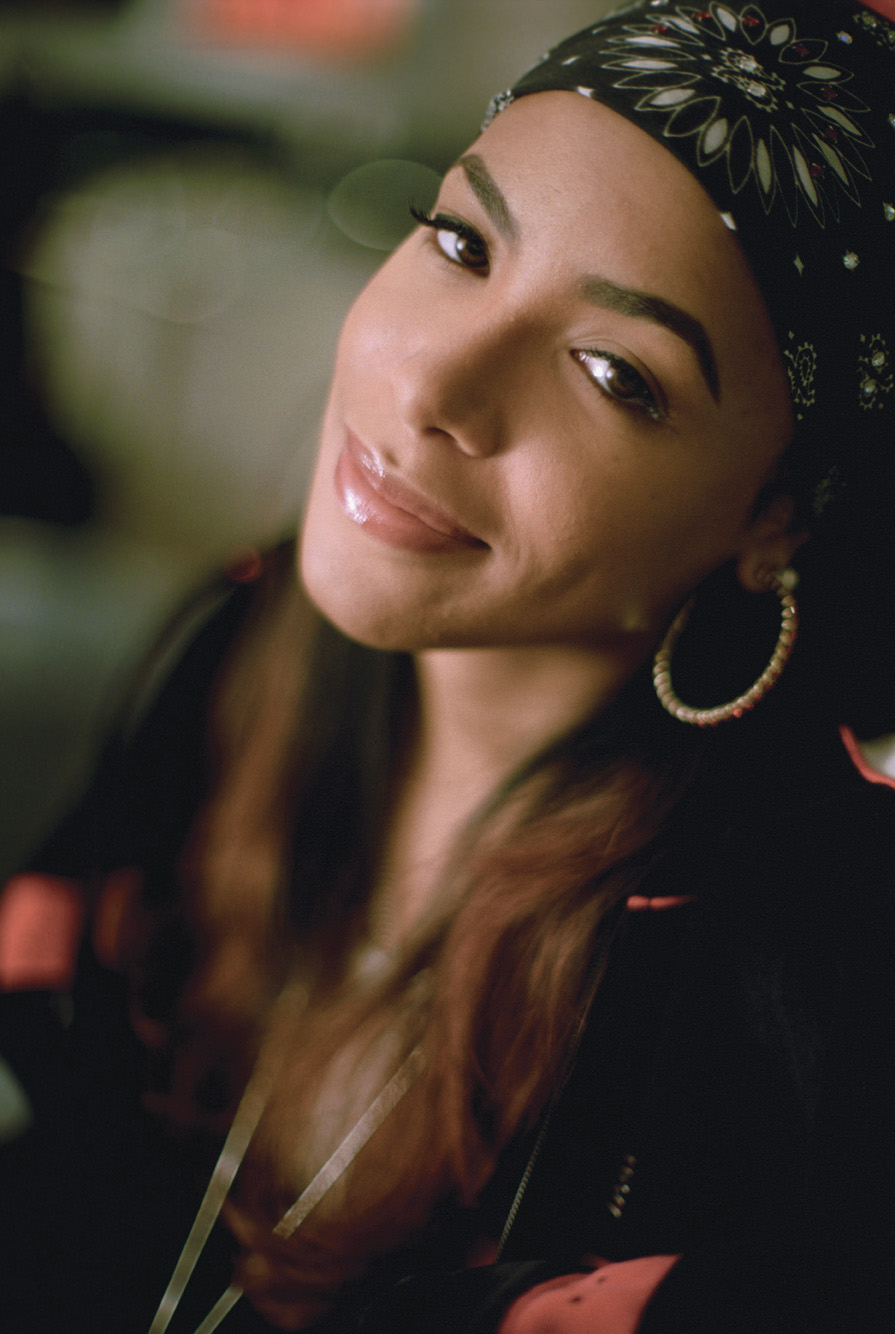
Aaliyah, who was 22, was among the fatalities in the crash.

On Saturday, August 25, at 6:50 p.m. (EDT), after she had completed her portions of the music video, Aaliyah and Virgin employees boarded a twin-engine Cessna 402B (registration N8097W) at the Marsh Harbour Airport, on the Abaco Islands, for the return trip back to Opa-locka Airport in Florida. The aircraft designated for the return flight was smaller than the one on which they had originally arrived, but it still had room to take on the whole party and all of their equipment.

The passengers had grown impatient because the Cessna was supposed to arrive at 4:30 p.m. EDT, but did not arrive until 6:15 p.m. EDT. Charter pilot Lewis Key claimed to have overheard passengers arguing with the pilot, Luis Morales III, prior to take off, adding that Morales warned them that there was too much weight for a "safe flight". Key further stated: "He tried to convince them the plane was overloaded, but they insisted they had chartered the plane and they had to be in Miami Saturday night." Key indicated that Morales gave in to the passengers and that he had trouble starting one of the engines.

According to Kathy Iandoli's 2021 biography, Aaliyah was a nervous flier. She had serious reservations about flying on the small, overloaded plane and refused to board. After arguing with the rest of her entourage about it, she retreated into a taxicab to rest, claiming that she had a headache. One of the passengers was sent to check on her and proceeded to give her an unidentified pill and a glass of water. She took the pill, fell back asleep, and was aided into the plane.

The aircraft crashed shortly after takeoff, about 200 feet (60 m) from the runway. Aaliyah and five of the eight others on board were killed instantly. Scott Gallin, Aaliyah's security guard, and two other people initially survived the crash, but died shortly afterwards. According to the paramedics on scene, Gallin spent his last moments asking about Aaliyah's condition.

One witness recalled the condition of the bodies: "It was an awful sight. Some bodies were so badly disfigured, you couldn't identify them. And two guys were alive – one screaming and screaming for help. He was horribly burned all over." A pilot who witnessed the crash saw the Cessna go down as he was working on some machinery "about half a mile" (800 m) away. He recalled the aircraft being only "60 to 100 feet" (18 to 30 m) off the ground before it crashed. He went to get a fire truck and was stunned by what he saw upon arriving at the crash site. "It was pretty devastating. The aircraft was broken into pieces and some of the seats were thrown from the aircraft."

== Reaction ==
With the remaining crew left behind on the island, and too scared to get on a plane to return to the United States following Aaliyah's crash, singer Lenny Kravitz, a personal friend of "Rock the Boat" choreographer Fatima Robinson, sent his private jet to collect her and the dancers. Fans of Aaliyah were reportedly grieving in New York City, where the singer had spent the first five years of her life before relocating to Detroit. Quincy Jones told the Associated Press that he was devastated by her death. The then Bahamian Minister for Tourism O. Tommy Turnquest stated: "We find it devastating and most unfortunate that after having this world-famous star Aaliyah and her crew select the Bahamas as their choice location for her latest video, the project has climaxed on such a tragic note." Two days after she died, on August 27, fans gathered near her former high school to remember her in a candlelight vigil. By August 29, nearly 6,000 people had emailed BBC News "expressing shock and sorrow" at her death.

Gladys Knight said she felt "blessed" to have known Aaliyah and stated: "I watched her grow up, and, with the rest of the world, saw her achieve success with her special and unique talents." She continued: "From an early age, I knew she had enormous talents, an intrinsic gift. When she first performed with me in Las Vegas, she was still quite young, but she already had it – that spark the world would later see and fall in love with." Silbert Mills, an official on Abaco Island, reported the denizens playing her music there and added: "That's the whole tragedy of it. We felt as if we knew her, yet we didn't." Destiny's Child lead singer Beyoncé Knowles praised her good nature and stated: "She was one of the first celebrities we met, she was so nice, we went out, we hung out with her, and it's really sad and we're trying to be strong." Lil' Kim described the crash as "really devastating" and said she "could never find anything bad about her".

Actor Jet Li, Aaliyah's co-star from the film Romeo Must Die, heard of her death and was "deeply saddened that she is no longer with us. She was a wonderful and talented artist who will be missed by everyone whose lives she touched." DMX called her "talented, classy, warm, beautiful, compassionate, humble." Damon Dash said he was "crushed and heartbroken over the loss of such a beautiful and talented woman whom I loved deeply and meant the world to me". Sean Combs remembered Aaliyah as "just one of those individuals that would light up a room", adding: "She was very down to earth. She was a special individual ... We all saw her grow up from a little girl into a woman. It's a hard, sad day for everyone." Ginuwine referred to her as family, said he would miss her and offered his condolences to her family, while speaking to the New York Daily News from Los Angeles. Brian McKnight complimented Aaliyah as being "really genuine and nice and not jaded about being a star". Jill Scott said she felt numb over Aaliyah's death given her age, talent and beauty and added, "It hurts, and it's sad, and we'll miss her."

On August 27, Troi Torain, a radio shock jock known professionally as "Star", made a segment on New York radio station Hot 97 mocking Aaliyah's death by playing a tape of a woman screaming while a crash was heard in the background. Rumors circulated that he was attacked by friends of Aaliyah, which he denied. Torain was later suspended, and expressed remorse for his actions, admitting they were in "poor taste". He said, "I'm trying not to make fun of anything Aaliyah-related right now, because I'm aware people are trying to focus all their anger on me."

== Remains returned to the United States ==
On August 28, Aaliyah's remains were transported from the Bahamas back to the United States. Over 100 people waited outside the funeral home in Nassau as four men lifted her coffin into a hearse. It was then taken to the Nassau International Airport, where a private jet waited to return the body to Newark International Airport in New Jersey.

The other victims' bodies were repatriated on August 29. A U.S. Embassy spokesman reported that Virgin Records America paid the cost of all mortuary services in the Bahamas, the return of the bodies to the U.S., as well as the funerals.

Aaliyah's family was staying at the Trump International Hotel in New York when her body was returned. Staff reported flowers and condolences had been sent in steadily since her death. A worker at the reception desk disclosed that at least 500 bouquets, delivered mostly by grieving fans, had arrived for the family in the three days between the crash and the return of her body. Aaliyah's publicist, Jill Fritzo, said the Haughton family was touched by the support they received from fans and reported the condition of the family: "They're hanging in there. It's very tough for them".

== Investigation ==
According to the findings of an inquest conducted by the coroner's office in the Bahamas, Aaliyah suffered from "severe burns and a blow to the head", in addition to severe shock and a weak heart. The coroner theorized that she went into such a state of shock that even if she had survived the crash, her recovery would have been nearly impossible. The bodies, some of them badly burned, were taken to the morgue at Princess Margaret Hospital in Nassau, where they remained until relatives made positive identification.

The accident was investigated by the Civil Aviation Department. It determined that the aircraft was over its maximum takeoff weight by more than 900 pounds (410 kg) and had one more passenger than it was certified to carry. An informational report issued by the National Transportation Safety Board (NTSB) stated, "The airplane was seen lifting off the runway, and then nose down, impacting in a marsh on the south side of the departure end of runway 27." It indicated that pilot Morales was not approved to fly the aircraft. Morales had falsely obtained his FAA license by showing logs of hundreds of flight hours he had never flown. He may also have falsified the number of hours he had flown to get the job with his employer, Blackhawk International Airways. Additionally, Morales' toxicology report revealed traces of cocaine and alcohol in his system.

The NTSB reported that the maximum allowed gross weight of the aircraft was "substantially exceeded" and that the center of gravity was positioned beyond its rear limit. The U.S. joined the investigation on August 27, 2001, as authorities from the NTSB and the FAA arrived in the Bahamas. On August 31, the day of Aaliyah's funeral, an independent expert of the Cessna Pilots Association reported that the aircraft was overloaded.

== Criticism of Blackhawk ==
Blackhawk International Airways came under scrutiny by the FAA, which reported that the charter service had authorization for limited use of the aircraft, including that only one specific named pilot was permitted to fly the aircraft and that Morales was not that authorized pilot. In the three years prior to the crash, Blackhawk had been cited four times for violations. The company was fined $1,500 in 1998 (equivalent to $3,000 in 2025) for violating safety rules in U.S. airspace. It received a warning for not testing employees for drugs in 1999 and was cited in 2000 for failing to comply with maintenance standards. Gilbert Chacon, head of Blackhawk at the time of the crash, pleaded guilty in 1993 to bankruptcy fraud involving another charter service. There was no evidence that Blackhawk managers had prior knowledge of Chacon's background.

=== Pilot's background ===
After the crash, revelations came to light concerning Morales' private life, as well as his activities during the final month before the crash. From an early age, Morales had expressed interest in aviation. His grandfather was a commercial pilot who gave him his first flights at age eleven. Morales began formal flight training at age seventeen at the Isla Grande Flying School at Fernando Ribas Dominicci Airport in Isla Grande, San Juan, Puerto Rico. Following the accident, authorities told his relatives not to discuss the case; however, Morales' sister spoke on behalf of the family: "We are confident the investigation is not going to disclose anything that would involve negligence on behalf of my brother. He has vast experience flying planes. He had been doing it since he was 14... They are talking about a person who cannot defend himself."

Morales received his pilot's license in February 2000. His job for Blackhawk was his second attempt to work as a commercial pilot since getting his license. In October 2000, he had been turned down for being too inexperienced after applying to Tropic Air of Fort Lauderdale, Florida.

Broward County sheriff's records showed Morales had been caught with crack cocaine in his car after being pulled over for driving through a stop sign on August 7, 2001; he was booked on a felony cocaine-possession charge. He was also charged for driving with a suspended license and running a stop sign. Morales told officers he was in the area to purchase powder cocaine for a friend. He was sentenced to probation on August 13, 2001.

Other reports, such as one by The New York Times and another in the Broward County Sun-Sentinel, questioned whether Morales was qualified to fly the aircraft. Gabriel Penagaricano, a lawyer for the Morales family, dismissed any questions about his flight record as "the words of a fool". He defended Morales as a "young man, totally dedicated to his profession ... [who] had set his sights on flying for one of the major airlines. In the meantime, he was doing what everybody else of his age and experience does, which is to fly for a charter operator in order to build up flying time." Penagaricano claimed Morales was "certainly" qualified to pilot a Cessna 402B. Shortly before the crash, Morales was fired as a pilot from Golden Airlines in Florida for failing to appear at work.

On August 28, 2001, U.S. aviation officials said that Morales had been hired by Blackhawk just two days before the crash and was not authorized by the FAA to fly the aircraft for the operator. FAA records showed that Blackhawk was clear to fly aircraft under a single-pilot certificate. However, according to Kathleen Bergen, Morales was not on the name authorization papers. Bergen did not identify the pilot who was on the papers, since "it would not be appropriate" to release it, but confirmed Morales was not qualified to fly the Cessna. Morales' father addressed his son's death and responsibility in the crash: "Luis was responsible for nine lives – eight plus his own. Someone is going to have to respond for those eight lives. And someone is going to have to respond for his life to me." He said he had spoken to his son in early August 2001 and the younger Morales related he was doing something he was passionate about.

== Lawsuits ==
The day of the crash was Morales' first official day with Blackhawk, an FAA Part 135 single-pilot operation. He was not registered with the FAA to fly for Blackhawk and, as a result of the accident, Aaliyah's parents filed a wrongful death lawsuit against the company, which was settled out of court for an undisclosed amount.

=== Family lawsuits ===
The families of Foreman and Dodd filed lawsuits against Virgin Records America, alleging the record company was negligent in chartering the aircraft that crashed, killing all the passengers. The lawsuit noted that Blackhawk had been cited four times in the previous four years. At a news conference, attorney Brian Panish charged that the crash victims died instantly because Virgin Records America "put profits over people". In less than a week, the relatives of Gallin sued Virgin Records America, claiming that the label, and its affiliated music and video production units, were liable for his death because they handled the arrangements for Aaliyah's video shoot in the Bahamas. Gallin's relatives claimed that the label should have hired a "competent" transportation broker and air charter company, and that Blackhawk allowed the pilot to fly the aircraft even though he was unqualified, and took off with it dangerously overloaded. Stuart Grossman represented the Gallin family during the lawsuit and reasoned that even the pilot did not want to take off because of overloading and called it "outrageous". He added: "This is a case of trying to put a size 12 foot in a size 10 shoe."

=== Diane and Michael Haughton lawsuit ===
In May 2002, Aaliyah's parents filed a lawsuit, similar to those filed by the families of Foreman and Dodd, against Virgin Records America in Los Angeles, alleging negligence. Their lawsuit claimed that a "dangerous and unsafe configuration" of the Cessna was the cause of the crash and that it was the "wrong plane" for the charter flight; the litigation also asserted that Morales was not properly qualified to operate the aircraft. In addition to suing Virgin Records, the lawsuit named Blackhawk, music video director Harold Williams, Instinct Productions, Big Dog House Films, Blackground Records LLC and Skystream. An investigator for the Civil Aviation Department stated neither Blackhawk nor Skystream had a permit to operate commercial charter flights in the Bahamas. In September 2003, the Haughtons' lawyers filed a notice in federal court that the case had been settled with an agreement to keep the monetary details confidential.

=== Nassau funeral home ===
In August 2002, the funeral home that had prepared the crash victims' bodies publicly accused Virgin Records America of not paying its bill. Loretta Butler-Turner, of Butler's Funeral Homes and Crematorium in Nassau, told Time magazine that $68,000 was spent preparing the bodies and, at the time, Virgin executives Ken and Nancy Berry agreed to cover all expenses. At the time of Turner's announcement, the Berrys had left the record label. Turner tried to contact executives at Virgin Records and appealed to the U.S. Embassy in Nassau for help, but failed to resolve the situation. Although the funeral home did not take legal action, Turner did contact Robert Spragg, the Haughtons' lawyer. According to Spragg, the label also owed the Haughton family money for funeral costs, stating: "Those payments were never made to the family to reimburse those costs, and they were substantial."

Turner spoke to E! Online about the case and reflected on how events had unfolded. "Because Aaliyah was, in their words, 'high profile,' they asked us to expedite things. So we were working over the weekend to get the bodies out as quickly as possible," Turner said. "[The deal] was all verbal, but the truth of the matter is, [the Berrys] knew they were obliged. They contacted all of the families themselves, sent us all of the necessary information, and told us not to deal directly with the family members, that they would be responsible." It was reported that Aaliyah's parents planned to file a lawsuit against Virgin Records for not fulfilling its promise to pay Aaliyah's funeral expenses. Turner said she would hold on to the victims' death certificates, which were required before estates could be settled or lawsuits could be filed.

Turner said she had been unsuccessful in contacting Virgin executives by telephone calls, letters and faxes. She said the funeral home had a good relationship with the U.S. Embassy, which, according to her, had supported a potential lawsuit against Virgin Records since Butler's was a reputable company. "Now this reputable company [Virgin] has kept us waiting for nearly a year and have basically said, since the Berrys are no longer there, they have no responsibility to us. I don't know if they think we are some sort of Third-World banana republic and we're not up to scratch, but it just gives a pretty bad view of things in our view."

=== Lawsuit against Instinct Productions ===
Barry & Sons, Inc., a corporation formed in 1992 to develop, promote and capitalize Aaliyah, and to oversee the production and distribution of her records and music videos—in which did business under the name Blackground Records—brought an unsuccessful lawsuit in New York Supreme Court against Instinct Productions LLC, the company that was hired in August 2001 to produce the music video for "Rock the Boat".

In May 2004, a judge ruled that Blackground could sue Instinct. Blackground had filed a negligence lawsuit in civil court against Instinct in November 2003. Instinct argued that Blackground had no right to recover damages since Aaliyah was a company employee. Judge Carol Edmead, however, found that Aaliyah was also Blackground's chief asset. She wrote that the company's "growth and prosperity were primarily the result of its efforts to successfully develop and nurture Aaliyah's career". Edmead noted the company was founded in 1992 by Barry Hankerson for the sole purpose of promoting Aaliyah, who was thirteen at the time.

The case was ultimately dismissed because New York's wrongful death statute permits only certain people related to the deceased to recover damages for wrongful death.

=== Jomo Hankerson v Barry Hankerson ===
In August 2026, Barry Hankerson's son, Jomo, sued his father, for breaching a settlement over music rights. Specifically, he cites Aaliyah's recording masters and music publishing copyrights. Not just her, though, but also for artists such as DMX, Toni Braxton, and Timbaland. Jomo claims that, per an alleged settlement deal, he's owed 12% of the money Barry made from the aforementioned music assets. The documents also show that Barry blamed Jomo for Aaliyah's death, stating that Jomo "failed in his responsibility" to make adequate travel plans, which resulted in a plane crash that "may have been avoided had [Jomo] followed through on his compensated task of travel coordination."

== In popular culture ==
The Jay-Z song "Glory" mentioned the crash, with the rapper warning his daughter Blue Ivy Carter to exercise safety in the lyric, "Just make sure the plane you're on is bigger than your carry-on baggage".
