= JoJo discography =

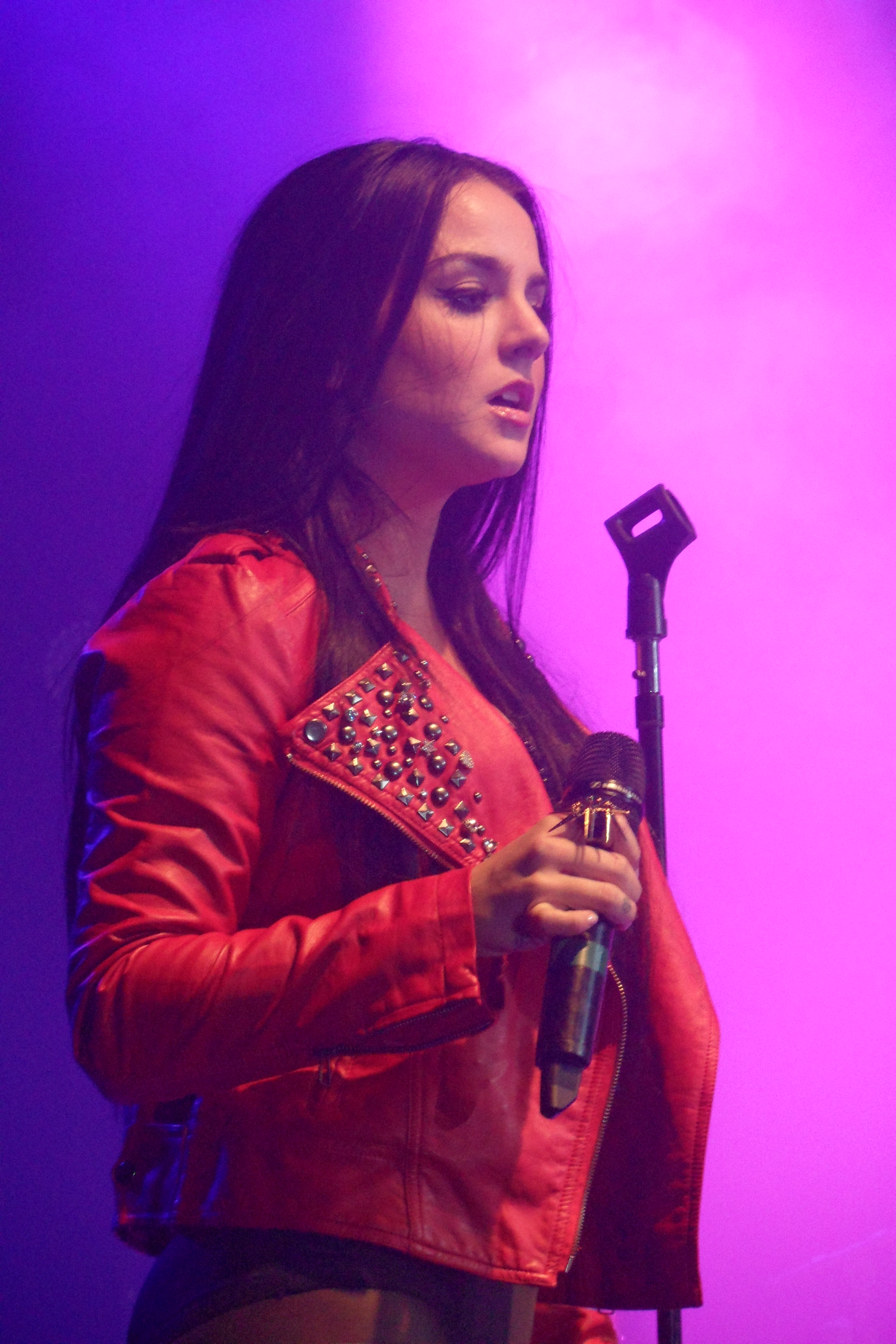
- JoJo performing on the Joe Jonas & Jay Sean Tour in 2011
- Studio albums: 6
- Extended plays: 4
- Singles: 33
- Music videos: 40
- Promotional singles: 16
- Mixtapes: 2
- Re-recordings: 2

American singer-songwriter JoJo has released six studio albums, two mixtapes, four extended plays (EP), two re-recordings, twenty-one singles (including five as a featured artist), fifteen promotional singles, and 40 music videos (including four unreleased). According to Recording Industry Association of America, JoJo has sold 2 million digital singles and 1.5 million albums in the United States. After JoJo competed on the television show America's Most Talented Kids she signed a seven-album record deal with Blackground Records in 2003 and released her debut album the following year at the age of 13.

In the United States, JoJo was released on June 22, 2004; which peaked at number four on the US Billboard 200, while charting into the top 40 on several other music markets. It was later certified platinum in the United States and has sold 1.3 million copies in the US. The album's lead single, "Leave (Get Out)", peaked at number twelve on the US Billboard Hot 100 and was later certified gold. The single peaked at number one on Billboard Mainstream Top 40 for five weeks making JoJo, at age 13, the youngest solo artist to ever have a number-one single on that chart. Internationally, the single charted within the top five in the UK and nine other countries. The album's second single "Baby It's You" featuring Bow Wow peaked at number 22 on the US Billboard Hot 100, while the album's final single "Not That Kinda Girl" was released internationally only. JoJo sold three million copies worldwide to date.

JoJo released her second studio album, The High Road, on October 17, 2006. The album peaked at number three on the Billboard 200 and was certified gold in the United States and has sold 538,000 copies. The album's lead single, "Too Little Too Late", became a top five hit on the Billboard Hot 100. The song broke Mariah Carey's record for the biggest jump into the top three entry on the chart when it moved from number 66 to number three. "Too Little Too Late" also reached the top ten in the UK and nine other countries. The album also generated the singles "How to Touch a Girl" and "Anything", the latter reached the top 40 of the UK Singles Chart for three weeks and charted on the Billboard Mainstream Top 40 at number 38. The High Road sold three million copies worldwide.

Record label disputes prevented JoJo from commercially releasing her third studio album, with All I Want Is Everything (2009) and Jumping Trains (2011) remaining unreleased, along with several others unnamed. JoJo's first mixtape, Can't Take That Away from Me, was released on September 7, 2010. It was preceded by the single "In The Dark". Standalone singles "Disaster" and "Demonstrate" were released during the interim. JoJo's second mixtape, Agápē, was released on December 20, 2012, and produced three singles, "We Get By", "André" and "Thinking Out Loud". Following her contractual release from Blackground, JoJo signed with Atlantic Records in December 2013 and released her extended play #LoveJo which included cover songs of Atlantic-affiliated artists Anita Baker and Phil Collins. JoJo's second EP III. was released on August 21, 2015, which produced the singles "When Love Hurts", "Say Love" and "Save My Soul". Her third EP #LoveJo2 was released on December 18, 2015.

JoJo's third studio album, Mad Love. was released on October 14, 2016, ten years after her last commercially released album and peaked at number six on the Billboard 200. The album's lead single, "Fuck Apologies", featuring Wiz Khalifa became a moderate success, charting on the U.S. Billboard Pop Digital Songs chart, peaking at number 40. It became JoJo's first charting single in the UK since 2007's "Anything" peaking at number 104 on the singles chart and number 18 on the UK R&B Singles Chart. "FAB." featuring Remy Ma served as the album's second single. On December 21, 2018, JoJo released re-recorded versions of JoJo and The High Road after the originals were removed from online platforms due to legal issues. JoJo's fourth studio album Good to Know was released on May 1, 2020. Her fifth studio album and first holiday album December Baby was released on October 30, 2020. JoJo's sixth studio album Trying Not to Think About It was released on October 1, 2021. JoJo’s fourth EP NGL was released on January 24, 2025. To date, she has sold more than six million albums worldwide.

== Albums ==
=== Studio albums ===
List of studio albums, with selected chart positions, sales figures and certifications
Title	Album details	Peak chart positions										Sales	Certifications
Title	Album details	US	AUS	BEL	CAN	GER	IRE	JP	NZ	SWI	UK	Sales	Certifications
JoJo	Released: June 22, 2004; Label: Blackground, Universal; Formats: CD, Cassette, digital download, LP	4	86	—	23	54	70	30	36	30	22	WW: 3,000,000; US: 1,300,000	RIAA: Platinum; MC: Platinum; BVMI: Gold; BPI: Gold
The High Road	Released: October 17, 2006; Label: Blackground, Universal; Formats: CD, digital download, LP	3	—	94	12	—	94	45	—	96	24	WW: 3,000,000; US: 538,000	RIAA: Gold; MC: Gold; BPI: Gold
Mad Love	Released: October 14, 2016; Label: Atlantic; Formats: CD, digital download, LP	6	48	126	22	—	70	—	— (Note: Mad Love did not enter the NZ Top 40 Albums Chart, but peaked at number one on the NZ Heatseekers Albums Chart.)	—	46	US: 70,000	
Good to Know	Released: May 1, 2020; Label: Warner, Clover Music; Formats: CD, digital download, LP	33	—	—	—	—	—	—	—	—	— (Note: Good to Know did not enter the UK Top 100 Albums Chart, but peaked at number 44 on the UK Albums Sales chart.)		
December Baby	Released: October 30, 2020; Label: Warner, Clover Music; Formats: Digital download	—	—	—	—	—	—	—	—	—	—		
Trying Not to Think About It	Released: October 1, 2021; Label: Warner, Clover Music; Formats: CD, digital download, LP	— (Note: trying not to think about it did not enter the Billboard 200, but peaked at number eighty on the Top Album Sales Chart.)	—	—	—	—	—	—	—	—	— (Note: trying not to think about it did not enter the UK Top 100 Albums Chart, but peaked at number 56 on the UK Album Downloads chart.)		
"—" denotes releases that did not chart or were not released in that territory.

=== Acoustic albums ===
Title	Album details
Good to Know (Acoustic)	Released: July 10, 2020; Label: Warner, Clover Music; Formats: Digital download

=== Re-recordings ===
List of re-recorded studio albums
Title	Album details
JoJo (2018)	Released: December 21, 2018; Label: Warner, Clover Music; Formats: CD, digital download, LP
The High Road (2018)	Released: December 21, 2018; Label: Warner, Clover Music; Formats: CD, digital download, LP

=== Mixtapes ===
List of mixtapes
Title	Album details
Can't Take That Away from Me	Released: September 7, 2010; Formats: Digital download; Label: Self-released
Agápē	Released: December 20, 2012; Formats: Digital download; Label: Self-released

== Extended plays ==
List of extended plays
Title	Details
#LoveJo	Released: February 14, 2014; Formats: Digital download; Label: Atlantic
III	Released August 20, 2015; Formats: Digital download; Label: Atlantic
#LoveJo2	Released: December 18, 2015; Formats: Digital download; Label: Atlantic
NGL	Released: January 24, 2025; Formats: Digital download; Label: Clover Music, BMG

== Singles ==
=== As main artist ===
List of singles as main artist, with selected chart positions and certifications
Title	Year	Peak chart positions										Sales	Certifications	Album
Title	Year	US	US Pop	AUS	BEL	GER	IRE	NLD	NZ	SWI	UK	Sales	Certifications	Album
"Leave (Get Out)"	2004	12	1	2	4	9	3	4	2	5	2	US: 673,000	RIAA: Gold; ARIA: Platinum; BPI: Platinum; RMNZ: Platinum	JoJo
"Baby It's You" (featuring Bow Wow)	2004	22	7	16	41	15	13	36	3	14	8		RIAA: Gold; ARIA: Gold; RMNZ: Platinum	JoJo
"Not That Kinda Girl"	2005	—	—	52	—	85	—	—	—	—	—			JoJo
"Too Little Too Late"	2006	3	2	10	44	30	2	96	5	53	4	US: 821,000 (Note: Digital download sales as of March 2007.)	RIAA: Platinum; ARIA: Gold; RMNZ: Platinum; BPI: Platinum	The High Road
"How to Touch a Girl"	2006	— (Note: "How to Touch a Girl" did not enter the Billboard Hot 100, but peaked at number 4 on the Bubbling Under Hot 100 Singles chart.)	—	—	—	—	—	—	—	—	—			The High Road
"Anything"	2007	—	38	—	—	—	18	—	—	—	21			The High Road
"Disaster"	2011	87	29	—	—	—	—	—	—	—	—	US: 160,000 (Note: Digital download sales as of August 2012.)		Non-album single
"When Love Hurts"	2015	— (Note: "When Love Hurts" did not enter the Billboard Hot 100, but did chart on the Hot Dance Club Songs chart with a peak position of 3.)	— (Note: "When Love Hurts" did not enter the Billboard Pop Songs, but peaked at number 27 on the Pop Digital Songs chart.)	—	—	—	—	—	—	—	—			III.
"Fuck Apologies" (featuring Wiz Khalifa)	2016	—	— (Note: "Fuck Apologies" did not enter the Billboard Pop Songs, but peaked at number 40 on the Pop Digital Songs chart.)	—	—	—	—	—	—	—	104			Mad Love
"FAB" (featuring Remy Ma)	2016	—	—	—	—	—	—	—	—	—	—			Mad Love
"Joanna"	2019	— (Note: "Joanna" did not enter the Billboard Hot 100, but peaked at number 14 on the R&B Digital Song Sales Chart.)	—	—	—	—	—	—	—	—	—			Non-album singles
"Sabotage" (featuring Chika)	2019	— (Note: "Sabotage" did not enter the Billboard Hot 100, but peaked at number 18 on the R&B Digital Song Sales Chart.)	—	—	—	—	—	—	—	—	—			Non-album singles
"Man"	2020	— (Note: "Man" did not enter the Billboard Hot 100, but peaked at number 16 on the R&B/Hip-Hop Digital Song Sales Chart.)	38	—	—	—	—	—	—	—	—			Good to Know
"What U Need" (Note: "What U Need" is included on the deluxe edition of Good to Know.)	2020	— (Note: "What U Need" did not enter the Billboard Hot 100, but peaked at number 23 on the R&B/Hip-Hop Digital Song Sales Chart.)	—	—	—	—	—	—	—	—	—			Good to Know
"The Change"	2020	—	—	—	—	—	—	—	—	—	—			Non-album singles
"American Mood"	2021	—	—	—	—	—	—	—	—	—	—			Non-album singles
"Creature of Habit"	2021	—	—	—	—	—	—	—	—	—	—			Non-album singles
"Worst (I Assume)"	2021	— (Note: "Worst (I Assume)" did not enter the Billboard Hot 100, but peaked at number 25 on the Adult R&B Airplay Chart.)	—	—	—	—	—	—	—	—	—			Trying Not to Think About It
"Anxiety (Burlinda's Theme)"	2021	—	—	—	—	—	—	—	—	—	—			Trying Not to Think About It
"Porcelain"	2024	—	—	—	—	—	—	—	—	—	—			NGL
"Too Much to Say"	2024	—	—	—	—	—	—	—	—	—	—			NGL
"Ready To Love"	2025	—	—	—	—	—	—	—	—	—	—			NGL
"In It with You" (with Craig David)	2025	—	—	—	—	—	—	—	—	—	—			Commitment
"—" denotes releases that did not chart or were not released in that territory.

=== As featured artist ===
List of singles as featured artist, with selected chart positions
Title	Year	Peak				Album
Title	Year	US AC	US Adult R&B	US R&B/HH Air	US Gospel	Album
"Come Together Now" (among Artists for Hurricane Relief)	2005	39	—	—	—	Hurricane Relief: Come Together Now
"Sucks to Be You" (Clinton Sparks featuring LMFAO and JoJo)	2011	—	—	—	—	My Awesome
"Recognize" (Skizzy Mars featuring JoJo)	2016	—	—	—	—	Alone Together
"Say So" (PJ Morton featuring JoJo)	2019	—	8	32	—	Paul
"It Don't Matter" (Jacob Collier featuring JoJo)	2019	—	—	—	—	Djesse: Vol 2
"Damage Is Done" (with Y2K)	2020	—	—	—	—	Non-album single
"Slow Motion" (Lindsey Lomis featuring JoJo)	2020	—	—	—	—	In The Madness
"Dirty Laundry" (with Parson James)	2021	—	—	—	—	Non-album single
"My Peace" (with PJ Morton featuring Mr. TalkBox)	2022	—	18	—	21	Watch the Sun
"Cheat" (Mahalia featuring JoJo)	2023	—	—	—	—	IRL
"Sugar" (All Time Low featuring JoJo)	2025	—	—	—	—	Everyone's Talking!
"Folded" (remix) (Kehlani featuring JoJo)	2025	—	—	—	—	Folded Homage Pack
"—" denotes releases that did not chart or were not released in that territory.

=== Promotional singles ===
List of promotional singles, with selected chart positions
Title	Year	Peak		Album
Title	Year	US Rhyt.	US Pop Dig.	Album
"Back and Forth"	2004	—	—	JoJo
"Coming for You"	2007	—	—	The High Road
"Beautiful Girls Reply"	2007	39	—	Non-album single
"In the Dark"	2010	—	—	Can't Take That Away from Me
"Boy Without a Heart"	2010	—	—	Can't Take That Away from Me
"Sexy to Me"	2012	—	—	Non-album singles
"Demonstrate"	2012	—	—	Non-album singles
"We Get By"	2012	—	—	Agápē
"Andre"	2012	—	—	Agápē
"Say Love"	2015	—	34	III.
"Save My Soul"	2015	—	33	III.
"Mad Love"	2016	—	—	Mad Love
"Music"	2016	—	—	Mad Love
"Wonder Woman"	2017	—	—	Non-album single
"Lonely Hearts"	2020	—	—	Good to Know
"Can't Fight This Feeling"	2024	—	—	Lisa Frankenstein OST
"—" denotes releases that did not chart or were not released in that territory.

== Songwriting and other appearances ==
#	Song	Year	Artist	Album	Contribution
1	"Secret Love"	2004	JoJo	Shark Tale: Motion Picture Soundtrack	Vocalist
2	"If You Dream"	2009	Tank featuring JoJo, Toni Braxton, Faith Evans, Jordin Sparks, Charlie Wilson, Tyrese and Omarion	Music Inspired by More than a Game'	Featured vocalist
3	"Lose Control"	2009	Timbaland featuring JoJo	Shock Value II	Featured vocalist
4	"Timothy Where Have You Been"	2009	Timbaland featuring Jet	Shock Value II	Background Vocalist
5	"Uncharted Waters"	2011	RichGirl	Dime Divas	co-writer
6	"Uncharted Waters"	2011	RichGirl featuring JoJo and Ray J	Dime Divas	Featured vocalist, co-writer
7	"Paint"	2011	Travis Garland featuring JoJo	Last Man Standing	Featured vocalist, co-writer
8	"Besos"	2011	Paula DeAnda	—N/a	Background Vocalist, co-writer
9	"Heartbreak Survivor"	2011	Jake Zyrus	Infinity	Co-writer
10	"I Don't Wanna Cry"	2012	Josh Milan featuring JoJo	—N/a	Featured vocalist
11	"Don't Say Nothin’"	2012	JON MXCRO featuring JoJo	The Fifth Of Never - Gold Cup Edition	Featured vocalist
12	"Tease"	2012	Nick Hagelin featuring JoJo	—N/a	Featured vocalist
13	"Valkyrie (Art of War Remix)"	2013	Dawn Richard featuring JoJo and Denoté	—N/a	Featured vocalist
14	"Disaster"	2013	Mario Jefferson featuring JoJo	The Night I Forgot Your Name	Featured vocalist, co-writer
15	"Politics"	2013	Kenna & RJD2	Land 2 Air Chronicles II: Imitation Is Suicide Chapter 3	Co-writer, background vocals
16	"Touch Down"	2014	Koda Kumi	Bon Voyage	Co-writer
17	"Freq" (hidden track)	2014	Pharrell Williams featuring JoJo and Leah Labelle	G I R L	Featured vocalist (uncredited)
18	"C.W.Y.B"	2015	Leven Kali featuring Zack Sekoff and JoJo	4102	Featured vocalist
19	"Better With Love"	2015	Da Internz featuring JoJo and James Fauntleroy	Everyday Is Valentine's Day	Featured vocalist
20	"Recognize"	2016	Skizzy Mars featuring JoJo	Alone Together	Featured vocalist
21	"Free Somebody"	2016	Luna	Free Somebody	Co-writer
22	"Already All Ready"	2017	La'Porsha Renae	Already All Ready	Co-writer
23	"Your World"	2018	Kosine from Da Internz	—N/a	Featured vocalist, co-writer
24	"Don't Wake Me Up"	2018	The Newton Brothers, Callaghan Belle	Extinction: Music from the Motion Picture Soundtrack	Vocalist
25	"Somebody Else"	2019	Tank featuring JoJo	Elevation	Featured vocalist
26	"Time Alone With You"	2019	Jacob Collier featuring Daniel Caesar	Djesse Vol. 3	Background vocals
27	"Say So (Acoustic Version)"	2020	PJ Morton featuring JoJo	The Piano Album	Featured vocalist, co-writer
28	"Wonder Woman"	2020	Louise	Heavy Love	Co-writer
29	"University"	2020	Lido featuring JoJo, Brandon Arreaga, Col3trane and Santell	PEDER	Featured vocalist
30	"Hung Up On You"	2020	Stevie Mackey featuring JoJo & THE ELEVEN	The Most Wonderful Time	Featured vocalist, co-writer
31	"Try"	2022	Phony Ppl featuring JoJo	Euphonyus	Featured vocalist
32	"Remember Us"	2023	Stan Walker featuring JoJo	All In	Featured vocalist, co-writer
33	"Bottomline"	2024	Tori Kelly featuring JoJo	TORI. (+ a lil more)	Featured vocalist, co-writer
34	"Sugar"	2025	All Time Low featuring JoJo	Everyone's Talking!	Featured vocalist
35	"Snowing in Paris"	2025	Pentatonix featuring JoJo	Christmas in the City	Featured vocalist
36	"Vacation Eyes (Live)"	2026	Jonas Brothers featuring JoJo	Friends from Your Hometown	Featured vocalist

== See also ==
- JoJo videography
