= JoJo videography =

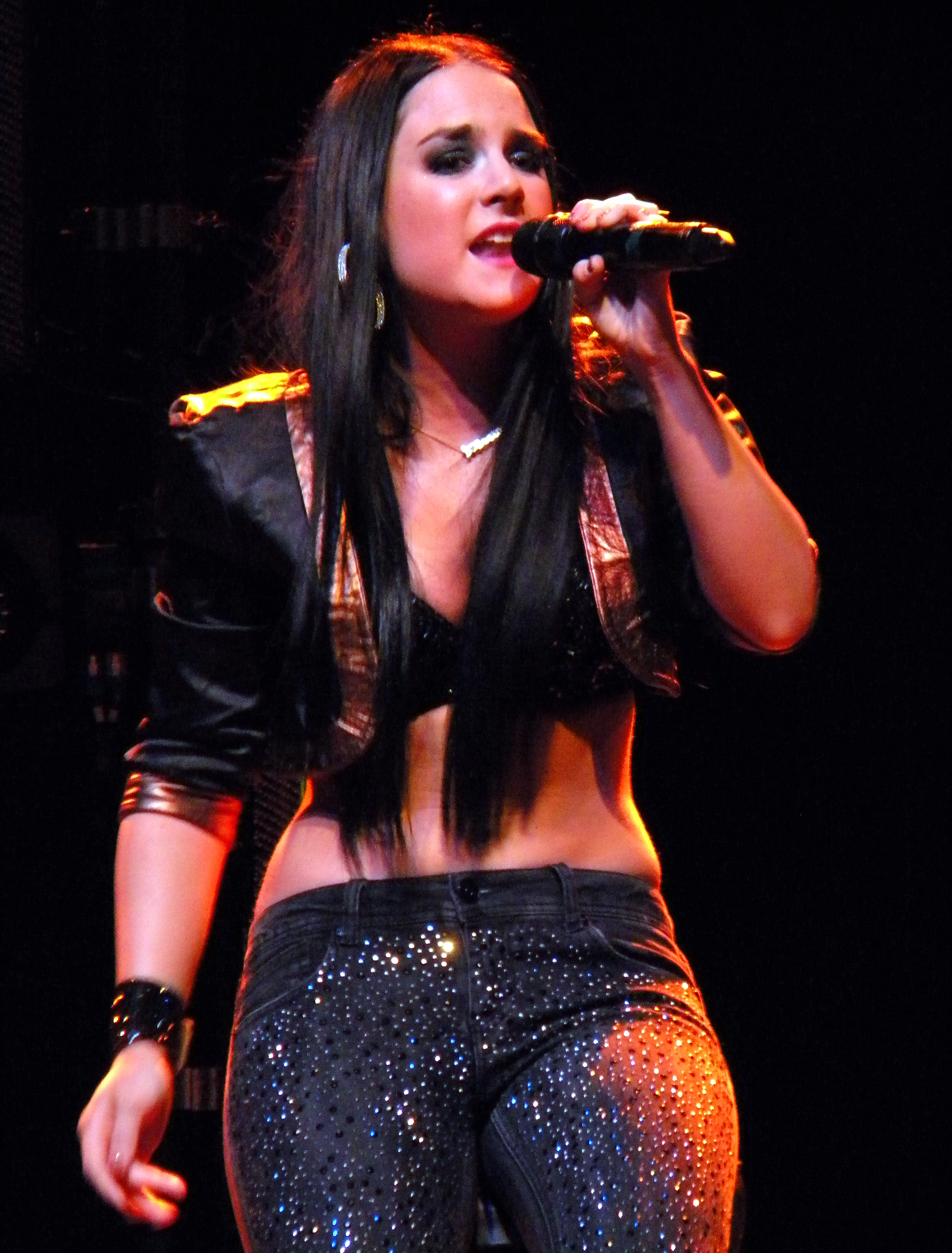
JoJo performing as the opening act on the Joe Jonas & Jay Sean Tour in Atlanta, Georgia on October 3, 2011

American singer-songwriter and actress JoJo has been featured in forty music videos, three theatrical films, one television film, and twelve television series including her first appearances on talent shows during her early years. She released her first music video for her debut single "Leave (Get Out)" was in early 2004 and since then she has released eleven other music videos and one lyric video as a lead artist. She appears in one music video as featured artist, one music video as a charitable featured artist and made a guest appearances in another five. JoJo made her television debut as a contestant on the Kids Say the Darndest Things hosted by Bill Cosby in 1998 at age 7 and made her first TV series appearance on The Bernie Mac Show as Michelle in mid 2002. Additionally, she starred in two big budget Hollywood films in 2006, Aquamarine as Hailey Rogers and RV as Cassie Munroe alongside Robin Williams & Josh Hutcherson as well as in the Lifetime made-for-TV movie True Confessions of a Hollywood Starlet in 2008.

== Music videos ==
=== As lead artist ===
Title	Year	Director(s)	Ref.
"Leave (Get Out)"	2004	Erik White	
"Baby It's You"	2004	Erik White	
"Not That Kinda Girl"	2005	Eric Williams and Randy Marshall	
"Too Little Too Late"	2006	Chris Robinson	
"How to Touch a Girl"	2006	Syndrome	
"In the Dark"	2010	Nicole Ehrlich & Clarence Fuller	
"The Other Chick"	2011	Kai Regan	
"Disaster"	2011	Benny Boom	
"Sexy to Me" (Lyric Video)	2012	Guy Logan	
"Demonstrate" (Unreleased)	2012	Jason Beattie	
"André"	2013	Patrick "Embryo" Tapu	
"Thinkin Out Loud" (Unreleased)	2013	Aaron A	
"When Love Hurts"	2015	Patrick "Embryo" Tapu	
"Say Love"	2015	Patrick "Embryo" Tapu	
"Right On Time"	2015	Reinaldo Irizarry & Kiley Martinez	
"Save My Soul"	2016	Zelda Williams	
"Fuck Apologies" (feat. Wiz Khalifa)	2016	Francesco Carrozzini	
"Music."	2016		
"FAB." (feat. Remy Ma)	2016	Wes Teshome	
"Edibles" (Unreleased)	2017		
"Joanna"	2019	Se Oh	
"Sabotage" (feat. Chika)	2019	James Larese	
"The Christmas Song"	2019		
"Man"	2020	Marc Klasfeld	
"Lonely Hearts"	2020	Zelda Williams	
"Comeback" (feat. Tory Lanez)	2020	Santiago Salviche	
"Small Things"	2020	Santiago Salviche	
"Think About You" (Acoustic)	2020	Zelda Williams	
"What U Need"	2020	Santiago Salviche	
"Wishlist" (featuring PJ Morton)	2020	Alfredo Flores	
"December Baby"	2020	Alfredo Flores	
"American Mood"	2021	Alfredo Flores	
"Creature of Habit"	2021	Alfredo Flores	
"Worst (I Assume)"	2021	Alfredo Flores	
"Anxiety (Burlinda's Theme)"	2021	Alfredo Flores	
"Can't Fight This Feeling"	2024	N/A	

=== As featured artist ===
Title	Year	Artist(s)	Director(s)
"Sucks To Be U"	2011	Clinton Sparks featuring LMFAO & JoJo	Matt Alonzo & Kai Henry
"Say So"	2019	PJ Morton featuring JoJo	Nathan Corrona
"Slow Motion"	2020	Lindsey Lomis featuring JoJo	Unknown
"Dirty Laundry"	2021	Parson James featuring JoJo	Alfredo Flores

=== Charity ===
Title	Year	Artist(s)	Director(s)
"Come Together Now"	2005	Various Artists for Hurricane Relielf	Billie Woodruff

=== Other appearances ===
Title	Year	Artist(s)	Director(s)
"The Way You Love Me	2010	Keri Hilson	Laurie Ann Gibson
"Favourite DJ"	2010	Clinton Sparks featuring Jermaine Dupri	Matt Alonzo and Kai Henry
"Tempat Ku"	2011	D'Hask	Rock Jacobs
"Sexify"	2012	Leah Labelle	Sarah Chatfield
"Happy"	2013	Pharrell Williams	We Are from L.A
"Scars to Your Beautiful"	2016	Alessia Cara	Aaron A
"SHUT UP"	2024	Jessie Reyez featuring Big Sean	Priya Minhas

== Filmography ==
List of television and films credits
Year	Title	Role	Notes
1998	Kids Say the Darndest Things	Contestant	Starring as Joanna Levesque
1999	Maury	Herself	Guest
1999–2000	Destination Stardom	Contestant	Starring as Joanna Levesque
2002	Developing Sheldon	Young Elizabeth	Starring as Joanna Levesque
2002	The Bernie Mac Show	Michelle	1 episode
2003	America's Most Talented Kid	Herself – performer	1 episode
2004	American Dreams	Young Linda Ronstadt	1 episode
2004	Shark Tale	Herself	Starring as Joanna "JoJo" Levesque
2005	Hope Rocks: The Concert with a Cause	Co-Host	Fox Special
2006	Romeo!	Herself	1 episode
2006	Aquamarine	Hailey Rogers	Main role, film debut
2006	RV	Cassie Munro	Main role
2007	Punk'd	Herself	Season 8, Episode 6
2008	True Confessions of a Hollywood Starlet	Morgan Carter / Claudia Miller	Lifetime, Main role
2010	House of Glam	Herself	Season 1, Episode 4 – La La Land
2011	Hawaii Five-0	Courtney Russell	Season 1, Episode 15 – Kai e'e
2011	The Dance Scene	Herself	Cameo
2013	G.B.F.	Soledad Braunstein	Main role
2017	Lethal Weapon	Shaye	Season 2, Episode 3: "Born to Run"
2019	The X Factor: Celebrity	Herself	Episode: "Auditions - Part 2"
2020	Lady Parts	Herself	Episode: "How to Find Your Erogenous Zones"
2022	Hell's Kitchen	Herself	Season 21, Episode 2: "Just Wingin' It"

== See also ==
- JoJo discography
