= JoJo Tour 2022 =

International concert tour

- Tour by JoJo
- Promotional poster for the tour
- Associated album: Good to Know; Trying Not to Think About It
- Start date: February 24, 2022
- End date: May 30, 2022
- Legs: 2
- No. of shows: 42
- Website: http://iamjojoofficial.com/tour

JoJo concert chronology
- Trying Not to Think About It Tour (2021); JoJo Tour 2022 (2022); Too Much To Say Tour (2025)

The JoJo Tour 2022 was the sixth headlining concert tour by American recording artist JoJo. JoJo announced the tour on October 26, 2021, which served in support of her fourth studio album Good to Know (2020) and sixth studio album Trying Not to Think About It (2021). The North American leg of the tour begun on February 24, 2022, in Portland, Oregon, United States and concluded on May 30, 2022, in Ottawa, Ontario.

== Background ==
On February 21, 2020, JoJo announced the Good to Know Tour, her planned sixth headlining and third major world tour in support of her fourth studio album. The tour was originally scheduled to travel throughout North America and Europe with the first leg initially beginning on April 21 at the Showbox in Seattle. On March 27, 2020, due to the COVID-19 pandemic, the North American leg of the tour was rescheduled, with new dates running throughout November and December. JoJo stated: "Everyone’s safety and health of course comes first, and we have no choice but to do the right thing and reschedule for later this year. Until then we’ll dance and sing together virtually!". The tour was then set to kick off with the original European dates throughout the UK beginning in Dublin, Ireland on Aug. 31.

On January 15, 2021, the tour was cancelled altogether due to the uncertainty of the pandemic. In a statement JoJo said: "While there is new hope and positivity surrounding the COVID vaccine, there is still immense uncertainty about touring this year. With that being said, and after careful consideration, I have decided to cancel the good to know tour (both U.S. and U.K./Europe)... At this point there is no other choice and I am BEYOND sorry to anyone this might inconvenience".

In October 2021, JoJo embarked on the Trying Not to Think About It Tour a six-date tour of the United States. On October 26, 2021, JoJo announced the "JoJo Tour 2022". JoJo said: “It felt so right being back onstage for those dates in October, and I can’t wait to do it on a bigger scale in more cities next year!". The tour was now in support of both JoJo's fourth studio album Good to Know (2020) and her fourth studio EP Trying Not to Think About It (2021). The first leg of the 45-date trek kicked off on February 24, 2022, in Portland, Oregon, United States, making stops in Seattle, San Francisco, Los Angeles, Nashville, Detroit, and Chicago, before concluding in Ottawa, Ontario on April 16, 2022. The second leg of the tour commenced on May 3 in London, England, heading to Scotland, Germany, Italy, and Denmark, before wrapping on May 30 in Stockholm, Sweden.

On February 1, 2022, JoJo announced that Quin, Tanerélle, and Lindsey Lomis would be support acts for the North American leg of the tour.

== Set list ==
This set list is representative of the March 1, 2022, performance in San Francisco. It does not represent all concerts for the duration of the tour.

1. "What U Need”
2. ”Man”
3. ”Spiral SZN”
4. ”Like That”
5. ”Gold”
6. ”Mad Love.”
7. ”Love On The Brain” (Rihanna" cover)
8. ”High Heels”
9. “Worst (I Assume)”
10. “Dissolve”
11. “Marvins Room” (Drake" cover)
12. “Boy Without A Heart”
13. “Anxiety (Burlinda’s Theme)”
14. “Demonstrate”
15. “Weak” (SWV cover)
16. “Say So”
17. ”Feel Alright”
18. “Comeback”
19. “Pedialyte”
20. “Think About You”
21. “Music”
22. “Leave (Get Out)”
23. “Too Little Too Late”
24. “Like This”
25. “Baby It's You”

== Tour dates ==
List of North American concerts
Date	City	Country	Venue	Opening acts	Attendance
February 24, 2022	Portland	United States	Wonder Ballroom	Quin	—N/a
February 26, 2022	Seattle	United States	The Showbox	Quin	—N/a
March 1, 2022	San Francisco	United States	Warfield Theatre	Quin	—N/a
March 3, 2022	Los Angeles	United States	The Novo by Microsoft	Quin; Lindsey Lomis	—N/a
March 5, 2022	Santa Ana	United States	The Observatory	Quin	—N/a
March 6, 2022	San Diego	United States	House of Blues	Quin	—N/a
March 8, 2022	Tucson	United States	Rialto Theatre	Quin	—N/a
March 10, 2022	Austin	United States	Scoot Inn	Quin	—N/a
March 12, 2022	Dallas	United States	The Studio at The Factory	Quin	—N/a
March 13, 2022	Houston	United States	House of Blues	Quin	—N/a
March 15, 2022	Atlanta	United States	Variety Playhouse	Quin	—N/a
March 17, 2022	Nashville	United States	Cannery Ballroom	Tanerélle; Lindsey Lomis	—N/a
March 19, 2022	Carrboro	United States	Cat's Cradle	Tanerélle; Lindsey Lomis	—N/a
March 21, 2022	Silver Spring	United States	The Filmore Silver Spring	Tanerélle; Lindsey Lomis	—N/a
March 22, 2022	Philadelphia	United States	Union Transfer	Tanerélle; Lindsey Lomis	—N/a
March 24, 2022	New Haven	United States	Toad's Place	Tanerélle; Lindsey Lomis	—N/a
March 26, 2022	New York City	United States	Terminal 5	Tanerélle; Lindsey Lomis	—N/a
March 29, 2022	Boston	United States	Roadrunner	Tanerélle; Lindsey Lomis	—N/a
April 1, 2022	Cleveland	United States	House of Blues	Tanerélle; Lindsey Lomis	—N/a
April 2, 2022	Cincinnati	United States	Bogart's	Tanerélle; Lindsey Lomis	—N/a
April 4, 2022	Detroit	United States	St. Andrew's Hall	Tanerélle; Lindsey Lomis	—N/a
April 5, 2022	Chicago	United States	The Vic Theatre	Tanerélle; Lindsey Lomis	—N/a
April 8, 2022	Milwaukee	United States	The Rave	Lindsey Lomis	—N/a
April 9, 2022	Minneapolis	United States	First Avenue	Lindsey Lomis	—N/a
April 13, 2022	Toronto	Canada	Danforth Music Hall	—N/a	—N/a
April 14, 2022	Montreal	Canada	Corona Theatre	—N/a	—N/a
April 16, 2022	Ottawa	Canada	Bronson Centre	—N/a	—N/a

List of European concerts
Date	City	Country	Venue	Opening acts	Attendance
May 3, 2022	London	England	Roundhouse	—N/a	—N/a
May 6, 2022	Dublin	Ireland	The Academy	—N/a	—N/a
May 9, 2022	Manchester	England	The Ritz	—N/a	—N/a
May 10, 2022	Glasgow	Scotland	The Garage	—N/a	—N/a
May 12, 2022	Brighton	England	Brighton Concorde 2	—N/a	—N/a
May 13, 2022	Birmingham	England	O2 Academy Birmingham	—N/a	—N/a
May 15, 2022	Paris	France	Alhambra	—N/a	—N/a
May 16, 2022	Cologne	Germany	Luxor	—N/a	—N/a
May 18, 2022	Amsterdam	Netherlands	Paradiso	—N/a	—N/a
May 21, 2022	Vienna	Austria	Grelle Forelle	—N/a	—N/a
May 23, 2022	Milan	Italy	Santeria Toscana 31	—N/a	—N/a
May 25, 2022	Berlin	Germany	Lido	—N/a	—N/a
May 27, 2022	Copenhagen	Denmark	Vega	—N/a	—N/a
May 28, 2022	Oslo	Norway	Parkteatret Scene	—N/a	—N/a
May 30, 2022	Stockholm	Sweden	Fryshuset	—N/a	—N/a

=== Cancelled shows ===
List of cancelled concerts
Date	City	Country	Venue	Reason
April 21, 2020	Seattle	United States	The Showbox	Rescheduled twice due to COVID-19 pandemic, officially cancelled in 2021.
April 22, 2020	Portland	United States	Wonder Ballroom	Rescheduled twice due to COVID-19 pandemic, officially cancelled in 2021.
April 25, 2020	San Francisco	United States	The Regency Ballroom	Rescheduled twice due to COVID-19 pandemic, officially cancelled in 2021.
April 27, 2020	Los Angeles	United States	The Novo by Microsoft	Rescheduled twice due to COVID-19 pandemic, officially cancelled in 2021.
April 28, 2020	Santa Ana	United States	The Observatory	Rescheduled twice due to COVID-19 pandemic, officially cancelled in 2021.
April 30, 2020	San Diego	United States	House of Blues	Rescheduled twice due to COVID-19 pandemic, officially cancelled in 2021.
May 1, 2020	Tucson	United States	Rialto Theatre	Rescheduled twice due to COVID-19 pandemic, officially cancelled in 2021.
May 4, 2020	Dallas	United States	Trees Dallas	Rescheduled twice due to COVID-19 pandemic, officially cancelled in 2021.
May 5, 2020	Houston	United States	House of Blues	Rescheduled twice due to COVID-19 pandemic, officially cancelled in 2021.
May 8, 2020	Nashville	United States	Cannery Ballroom	Rescheduled twice due to COVID-19 pandemic, officially cancelled in 2021.
May 10, 2020	Atlanta	United States	Variety Playhouse	Rescheduled twice due to COVID-19 pandemic, officially cancelled in 2021.
May 12, 2020	Carrboro	United States	Cat's Cradle	Rescheduled twice due to COVID-19 pandemic, officially cancelled in 2021.
May 14, 2020	New York City	United States	Terminal 5	Rescheduled twice due to COVID-19 pandemic, officially cancelled in 2021.
May 15, 2020	New Haven	United States	College Street Music Hall	Rescheduled twice due to COVID-19 pandemic, officially cancelled in 2021.
May 17, 2020	Silver Spring	United States	The Filmore Silver Spring	Rescheduled twice due to COVID-19 pandemic, officially cancelled in 2021.
May 19, 2020	Boston	United States	Royale	Rescheduled twice due to COVID-19 pandemic, officially cancelled in 2021.
May 20, 2020	Philadelphia	United States	Union Transfer	Rescheduled twice due to COVID-19 pandemic, officially cancelled in 2021.
May 22, 2020	Cincinnati	United States	Bogart's	Rescheduled twice due to COVID-19 pandemic, officially cancelled in 2021.
May 23, 2020	Cleveland	United States	House of Blues	Rescheduled twice due to COVID-19 pandemic, officially cancelled in 2021.
May 27, 2020	Chicago	United States	The Vic Theatre	Rescheduled twice due to COVID-19 pandemic, officially cancelled in 2021.
May 28, 2020	Detroit	United States	St. Andrew's	Rescheduled twice due to COVID-19 pandemic, officially cancelled in 2021.
May 30, 2020	Minneapolis	United States	First Avenue	Rescheduled twice due to COVID-19 pandemic, officially cancelled in 2021.
February 19, 2022	Edmonton	Canada	Midway	Venue capacity restrictions
February 20, 2022	Calgary	Canada	MacEwan Hall Ballroom	Venue capacity restrictions
February 23, 2022	Vancouver	Canada	Commodore Ballroom	Venue capacity restrictions
