= NGL (EP) =

EP by JoJo
- Released: January 24, 2025
- Length: 22:07
- Label: Clover Music
- Producers: Gino Barletta; JoJo; Scott Bruzenak; Theron "Neff-U" Feemster; Khris Riddick-Tynes; Leon Thomas; Relyt; Noise Club

JoJo chronology
Trying Not to Think About It (2021)	NGL (2025)

Singles from NGL
- 1. "Porcelain" Released: October 2, 2024; 2. "Too Much to Say" Released: November 20, 2024

NGL is the fourth extended play (EP) by American singer-songwriter JoJo. It was released on January 24, 2025, through her own imprint label Clover Music. Following her 2021 project Trying Not to Think About It, the EP spawned two singles, "Porcelain" and "Too Much to Say".

== Background and composition ==
JoJo's second studio album, The High Road (2006), spawned commercial success single "Too Little Too Late" which peaked number 3 on the US Billboard Hot 100. However, her record company had kept delaying her new releases, which led her to re-record the album alongside her self-titled debut album in 2018. Alongside those albums, JoJo further released several albums: Good to Know and December Baby in 2020, as well as Trying Not to Think About It in 2021, through her imprint label Clover Music. She also published a memoir titled Over the Influence, which became bestselling of the New York Times. Trying Not to Think About It failed to enter the US Billboard 200 chart; however, it reached numbers 51 and 80 on Top Current Album Sales and Top Album Sales charts, respectively. According to Stereogum, NGL incorporates elements of R&B and pop which JoJo had been pursuing more than 20 years ago.

== Promotion ==
NGL's first single is "Porcelain", released on October 2, 2024. JoJo announced NGL on November 20, the day of "Too Much to Say" was released as the EP's second single. To support the EP, JoJo made a series of promotional appearances in New York City. She also announced its accompanying tour in 2024, Too Much to Say Tour, which began at Marathon Music Works in Nashville on February 22, 2025, and concluded at Terminal 5 on March 29.

== Critical reception ==
Professional ratings
Review scores
Source	Rating
Riff Magazine	8/10

Writing for Melodic Magazine, Abby Anderson described NGL as a cohesive project that reflects a sound JoJo has "meticulously refined" over her career, exploring themes of healing and self-understanding. Mike DeWald of Riff Magazine described it as "a quick stop toward the next endeavor", indicating a promising and creatively fulfilling direction for her.

== Track listing ==
Track listing
No.	Title	Writer(s)	Producer(s)	Length
1.	"Off Again"	Gino Barletta; Joanna Levesque; Scott Bruzenak	Gino Barletta; JoJo; Scott Bruzenak; Theron "Neff-U" Feemster	0:24
2.	"Nobody"	David Williams II; Edwin Serrano; Levesque; Feemster	Feemster	2:39
3.	"Too Much to Say"	Coleridge Tillman; Levesque; Khris Riddick-Tynes; Leon Thomas	Riddick-Tynes; Thomas	2:54
4.	"Porcelain"	David J. Parks; Williams II; Serrano; Harry Wayne Casey; Levesque; Luke Campbell; Rick Finch; Feemster	Feemster	2:31
5.	"Ready to Love"	Levesque; Lauren Keen; Ryan Ashley; Tyler James Hotston	Relyt	2:55
6.	"Start Over"	Brandon Colbein; Christopher Petrosino; James Norton; Levesque; Robert Andrew McCurdy	Noise Club	3:11
7.	"One Last Time"	Parks; Williams II; Serrano; Levesque; Feemster	Feemster	3:59
8.	"Porcelain Reimagined"	Parks; Williams II; Serrano; Levesque; Feemster	Feemster	3:40
Total length:				22:07

=== Notes ===
- "Off Again" is stylized in all lowercase.

== Release history ==
List of release dates and formats
Region	Date	Format(s)	Label	Ref.
Various	January 24, 2025	Digital download; streaming	Clover Music	
