= Lonely Hearts (JoJo song) =

2020 song by JoJo

Promotional single by JoJo

from the album Good to Know
- Released: April 24, 2020
- Studio: Westlake (Los Angeles)
- Genre: Pop; R&B
- Length: 3:24
- Label: Clover; Warner
- Songwriters: Joanna Levesque; Elizabeth Lowell Boland; Martin McKinney; Merna Bishouty; Dylan Wiggins
- Producers: Merna Bishouty; Doc McKinney; Dylan Wiggins

Music video
- "Lonely Hearts" on YouTube

Alternative cover
- Demi Lovato remix cover

Audio video
- "Lonely Hearts" (feat. Demi Lovato) on YouTube

"Lonely Hearts" is a song by American singer and songwriter JoJo. It was released on April 24, 2020, as the first promotional single from JoJo's fourth studio album, Good to Know (2020). The song was written by JoJo, Elizabeth Lowell Boland, Martin McKinney, Merna Bishouty, and Dylan Wiggins, while the latter handled the song's production alongside Doc McKinney and Merna Bishouty vocally producing the song. Lyrically, the song is a story of self-improvement and self love for people who struggle with codependency.

The song received positive reviews from contemporary music critics, with many praising its sound similar to JoJo's second mixtape Agápē (2012). The song's accompanying music video was shot in director Zelda Williams's front yard while in quarantine due to the COVID-19 pandemic against a white bed sheet backdrop. The video premiered on JoJo's official YouTube channel on April 27, 2020. A remix featuring American singer Demi Lovato was released on August 28, 2020, as part of the deluxe edition of Good to Know.

== Background ==
"Comeback" was originally set to be an only promotional single, released from the album. During a live stream interview with Entertainment Weekly JoJo stated that the single released version of the song would include a male feature. On April 20, 2020, JoJo joined a live stream with singer Tory Lanez and the singers both confirmed they had a song in the works together. Two days later JoJo officially announced that "Comeback" would no longer serve as a promotional single from the album due to the late addition of a new feature and would be released alongside the album. "Lonely Hearts" was the officially released on April 24, 2020, in lieu of the song as the only promotional song released to promote the album. JoJo said the song "continues on the journey of self love that I've been on... how temptation and doubt arise... but at the end of the day how choosing self preservation over toxic relationships is the vibe right now".

== Development and production ==
JoJo camped out at House of Balloons in Toronto, Canada with songwriters Lowell and Doc McKinney during early writing sessions for the song. The song was written from a place of self reflection and truly being happy with being on your own. JoJo stated "I knew the importance of being on my own for a solid year because I had never really been single. I had jumped up from relationship to relationship and I started dating with [sic]? I was 14. I knew I had to go through this uncomfortable experience of sitting with my thoughts, being lonely and getting to know myself. I wasn't sure what my boundaries were and what was truly important to me independent of anybody else". JoJo continued: "I had just recycled relationships, gone back and kept doors open. I always had a comfort zone to go back to because I felt so much unpredictably in my personal life that I loved the predictability in my personal life. I realized I was doing something myself a disservice. That's where "Lonely Hearts" came from". The song began as a freestyle with JoJo singing it with a 90s R&B melody in mind for the song. JoJo concluded, "I started thinking about how I love the idea about being able to have casual sex, but it's never ends up being that casual. I can't have any of these types of friends and I just need to be by myself fully. That's where it came from".

"Lonely Hearts" was written by Elizabeth Lowell Boland, Martin McKinney, Merna Bishouty, Dylan Wiggins and JoJo for her fourth studio album Good to Know (2020). It was produced by Doc McKinney, who worked alongside Dylan Wiggins on production. The track was recorded with guidance by Ryan Gladieux. The mixing of "Man" was done by Tony Maserati with assistance for the song's mixing engineering by Najeeb Jones and eventually, the mastering was done by Dale Becker. Merna Bishouty served as the vocal producer for the song.

== Critical reception ==
"Lonely Hearts" received positive reviews from contemporary music critics, with many praising its honed R&B and hip hop infused sound alongside its confessional commentary. Ykigs from YouKnowIGotSoul praised the urban direction the song takes, stating "The smooth R&B record is what many have been wanting from JoJo for years and she delivers here". Mike Wass of Idolator called the song a "soulful gem". Madeline Roth from MTV News provided a positive review for continuing "her self-love chronicles", praising the song's content for being centered around the question that every person that struggles with codependency should ask themselves as shown in the chorus "How can I work on me, if I'm working on your body?". Roth concluded by calling the song "a soulful slow jam that shines as bright as the highlighter on her cheek in the single's artwork". In a track-by-track album review, Jonathan Currinn from CelebMix said the song is "undeniably powerful" and "easily showcases JoJo's versatility especially when we expect her to come out with incredible runs and beautiful vocals, and she does exactly that with calm precision that have a yearning quality to them".

== Live performances ==
In support with the America Food Fund in raising funds for the COVID-19 epidemic, JoJo performed the song live for the first time from her home.

== Music video ==
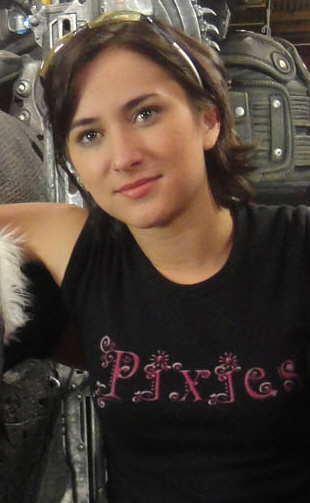
The music video was directed by Zelda Williams who also directed JoJo's "Save My Soul".

JoJo came up with the idea of the music video and contacted actress and personal friend Zelda Williams to direct the video. Williams is known for her directorial debut on JoJo's own "Save My Soul" music video in 2015. JoJo left her home and recorded the video in the front yard of director Williams' home due to quarantine restrictions caused by the COVID-19 pandemic. The music video was filmed in April 2020, and was originally planned to be shot at the Roosevelt hotel as mentioned in the song's lyrics.

The synopsis of the video takes place as a behind the scenes look of a photoshoot with JoJo in various set ups and looks. It was inspired by photographer Herb Ritts who was known for his take on black and white nude photography, while also channeling 1993 sports illustrated model Kathy Ireland. Williams stated she "had to figure out how to strip back everything and make something small scale look purposeful and sexy". The music video premiered on April 27, 2020 through JoJo's Official YouTube Channel. In a statement following the videos release, JoJo explained: "SO THANKFUL to have such talented friends to make things with. She stayed wearing a mask literally the whole time and made a very odd experience seriously fun".

== Credits and personnel ==
Credits were adapted from the liner notes of Good to Know.

Locations

- Recorded at Westlake Studios; Los Angeles
- Mixed at Mirrorball Studios; North Hollywood, California
- Mastered at Becker Mastering; Pasadena, California

Personnel

- JoJo – vocals, writing
- Merna Bishouty – vocal production, writing
- Elizabeth Lowell Boland – writing
- Martin McKinney – writing
- Tony Maserati – mixing
- Najeeb Jones – assistant mixing engineer
- Ryan Gladieux - recording
- Doc McKinney – producer
- Dylan Wiggins – producer, writing
- Dale Becker – audio mastering

== Release history ==
Release dates and formats
Region	Date	Format(s)	Version(s)	Label	Ref.
Various	April 24, 2020	Digital download; streaming	Clean; explicit	Clover; Warner	
Various	August 28, 2020	Digital download; streaming	Demi Lovato remix	Clover; Warner	
