= Over the Influence =

Memoir by JoJo

- Author: Joanna "JoJo" Levesque
- Audio read by: Joanna "JoJo" Levesque
- Language: English
- Genre: Memoir
- Publisher: Hachette Book Group, Pan Macmillan
- Publication date: September 17, 2024
- Publication place: United States
- ISBN: 9780306833144

Over the Influence is a memoir by American singer Joanna "JoJo" Levesque. It was published on 17 September 2024, by Hachette Book Group in the United States and Pan Macmillan in the UK and Australia. JoJo narrates the audiobook. Over the Influence became a New York Times best-seller in October 2024.

== Background and release ==
On March 7, 2024, JoJo announced in an interview with People at the Billboard Women in Music event plans to release her first memoir. She stated she had been working on the book for 2 years.

On June 4, 2024, JoJo announced the release date and title of her memoir Over the Influence. She aimed to release the memoir to coincide with the 20th anniversary of her debut album. JoJo stated she had written the memoir herself, without a ghostwriter.

The book contains 352 pages comprising 21 chapters. The audiobook version, narrated by JoJo herself, was released alongside the US edition of the book.

JoJo did an exclusive interview with People to promote her book, providing exclusive excerpts.

== Synopsis ==
JoJo traces the arc of her tumultuous life in her debut memoir. The title "Over the Influence" relates to themes that weave the story together, including her parents' struggles with addiction, her relationship with the music industry, and her own experiences of depression and self-destructive behaviours.

== Reception ==
=== Critical ===
Over the Influence received praise from Vogue, Los Angeles Times, Newsweek, and Publishers Weekly. Barnes & Nobel named the memoir as one of their "Best Entertainment Memoirs of 2024". Newsweek called it "Raw and unfiltered . . . [a] deeply personal perspective on how she learned to reclaim her power, both as an artist and a woman . . .".

=== Commercial ===
Over the Influence debuted at number twelve on the New York Times Bestseller list. It also debuted at number sixteen on the Publishers Weekly Bestseller List selling 6,883 units in its first week.

== Release history ==
Release history and formats for Over the Influence
Country	Release date	Edition	Publisher	Ref.
United States	September 17, 2024	ebook	Hachette Books	
United States	September 17, 2024	Audiobook	Hachette Audio	
United States	September 17, 2024	Hardcover	Da Capo	
United States	June 02, 2026	Trade paperback	Da Capo	
UK & Australia	September 19, 2024	ebook Audiobook	Pan Macmillian	
UK & Australia	October 02, 2025	Paperback	Pan Macmillian	

== Publication history ==
- Da Capo (2024): ISBN 978-0-306-83314-4
- Hachette Books (2024): ISBN 978-0-306-83316-8
- Hachette Audio (2024): ISBN 978-1-6686-4464-5
- Pan Macmillian (2024): ISBN 978-1-0350-6726-8
- Pan Macmillian (2024): ISBN 978-1-0350-6725-1
- Pan Macmillian (2025): ISBN 978-1-0350-6724-4
- Da Capo (2026): ISBN 978-0-306-83315-1
