= House of Glam =

- Country of origin: United States
- No. of seasons: 1
- No. of episodes: 8

Production
- Executive producers: Banks Tarver; Brandi Simpkins; Charles Suitt; Ken Druckerman
- Production companies: Foundry Media Group; Left/Right Productions

Original release
- Network: Oxygen
- Release: October 5 – November 19, 2010

House of Glam is an American reality television series from Oxygen that premiered on October 5, 2010. The show follows the interactions of the B. Lynn Group, a group of stylists and image consultants. B. Lynn fashion stylists, makeup artists and hairstylists have worked with some of the biggest names in the entertainment industry including Nelly, Jermaine Dupri, Mario, and JoJo.

== Cast ==
- Brandi Simpkins-Owner of the B. Lynn Group
- Crystal Streets
- Groovey Lew
- Amoy Pitters
- Atiba Newsome
- Mike B.
- Michiko
- Shaun Gannon

== Episodes ==
No.	Title	Original release date
1	"Big Egos"	October 5, 2010
2	"In Over Their Heads"	October 12, 2010
3	"Outsized"	October 19, 2010
4	"La La Land"	October 26, 2010
5	"Atiba's Dilemma"	November 5, 2010
6	"Celebrity Sample Sale"	November 12, 2010
7	"First Time for Everything"	November 19, 2010
8	"Battle Royale"	November 19, 2010
