= Trying Not to Think About It =

Studio album by JoJo
- Released: October 1, 2021
- Recorded: 2021
- Studios: T4U (Burbank); Sphere (Burbank); Blackwood (Los Angeles); Luuna's Room (Los Angeles); Prescription Songs (Nashville); Ameraycan Recording (North Hollywood)
- Genre: R&B
- Length: 32:56
- Labels: Clover Music; Warner
- Producers: Caroline Baker; Cardiak; James Droll; Dernst Emile II; Nikki Flores; Rob Grimaldi; Joanna Levesque; JordanXL; Noise Club; Kelvin Wu10

JoJo chronology
December Baby (2020)	Trying Not to Think About It (2021)	NGL (2025)

Singles from Trying Not to Think About It
- 1. "Worst (I Assume)" Released: August 20, 2021; 2. "Anxiety (Burlinda's Theme)" Released: October 1, 2021

Trying Not to Think About It is the sixth studio album (Note: A variety of sources call Trying Not to Think About It an EP, including streaming services and JoJo herself. However, other sources regard it as an album or studio album. Given those sources and Wikipedia's guideline, this article will label the project as a studio album.) by American singer-songwriter JoJo. It was released on October 1, 2021, by Clover Music and Warner Records. Following the release of her first Christmas album December Baby (2020), production began on the "time capsule project" at the start of 2021. She wanted to make a record that encapsulated the feelings she experienced as a result of the COVID-19 pandemic and the effects it had on her personal life, career, and confidence as a performer. The singer wrote and produced the project alongside Jordan XL, Noise Club, Dernst "D Mile" Emile II, Rob Grimaldi, Cardiak, Nikki Flores, and various other collaborators. With the exception of "B.I.D.", JoJo co-wrote every song on the album.

To promote the album, JoJo embarked on the Trying Not to Think About It Tour which began the day after its release. Trying Not to Think About It was further promoted through the 42-date world tour, JoJo Tour 2022, which began the following year. The project included two singles: a lead single, "Worst (I Assume)", which peaked at number 25 on the Adult R&B Airplay Chart, and "Anxiety (Burlinda's Theme)", released on the same day of the project's release.

Upon its release, Trying Not to Think About It received generally favorable reviews from music critics, being highlighted by several music publications in their year-end lists of the top R&B albums for 2021. Although the project failed to debut on the US Billboard 200, it charted on the Top Album Sales chart at number 80 and debuted at number 56 on the UK Album Downloads Chart.

== Background and development ==
On October 30, 2020, JoJo released her fifth studio album, December Baby, her first album of Christmas music. After having previously rescheduled her Good to Know Tour twice due to the then-ongoing COVID-19 pandemic, she eventually canceled the tour in January 2021, noting that she was planning on having a new album released by 2022.

JoJo first announced Trying Not to Think About It project in a YouTube livestream on May 27, 2021. She labeled it as neither an album nor EP stating: "I really want it to exist in its own little moment, have it look a certain way, feel a certain way and sound a certain way." She described the release as a "time capsule" of how she felt during the COVID-19 pandemic, saying: "The pandemic made all of us come face to face not only with ourselves but with our coping mechanisms."

== Recording and composition ==
Recording sessions for the project were generally conducted at Blackwood Studios in California with additional sessions in California's T4U Studios, Sphere Studios, Luuna's Room; Ameraycan Recording Studios and the Prescription Songs Nashville Studios in Nashville, Tennessee. Trying Not to Think About It has been described as an R&B album.

== Promotion ==
On August 16, 2021, JoJo announced Trying Not to Think About It along with its lead single "Worst (I Assume)". The song was written by JoJo alongside Tiara Thomas, Carl McCormick, and Kelvin Wooten, while produced by Cardiak and Kelvin Wu10. Its accompanying music video was shot in Downtown, Los Angeles with director Alfredo Flores and was shot in one take. On the same day of the project's release, JoJo released its second single, "Anxiety (Burlinda's Theme)", alongside a music video also directed by Flores.

=== Tour ===
Trying Not to Think About It Tour
- Tour by JoJo
- Promotional poster for the tour
- Associated album: Trying Not to Think About It
- Start date: October 2, 2021
- End date: October 11, 2021
- Legs: 1
- No. of shows: 6 in North America

JoJo concert chronology
- Leaks, Covers and Mixtapes Tour (2018); Trying Not to Think About It Tour (2021); JoJo Tour 2022 (2022)

JoJo announced on her Instagram that the Trying Not to Think About It Tour would commence immediately following the release of the album. The tour was a six-date run of intimate live shows that visited Boston, NYC, Philadelphia, Atlanta, Nashville, and Los Angeles. The show included the first live performances of songs from JoJo's fourth studio album, Good to Know. General on sale tickets went on sale on Friday, August 20, 2021, at 10:00 am. Tiara Thomas was announced as an opening act for all tour dates, but on October 2, it was announced that due to unforeseen circumstances Thomas would only appear at the Los Angeles show. She further promoted the project through the 42-date world tour, JoJo Tour 2022, which began the following year.

== Critical reception ==
Professional ratings
Review scores
Source	Rating
Pitchfork	6.3/10

Dani Blum from Pitchfork provided a mixed review of Trying Not to Think About It, who called it her "rawest and most cohesive project to date", but also said that it "too often relies on familiar imagery".

=== Year-end lists ===
Publication	List	Rank	Ref.
Yardbarker	The Best R&B Albums of 2021	10	
Vibe	The 21 Best R&B Albums of 2021	5	
American Songwriter	The 41 Best Albums of 2021	2	
Rated R&B	30 Best R&B Albums of 2021	16	

== Commercial performance ==
Trying Not to Think About It failed to debut on the US Billboard 200, but it debuted on the Top Current Album Sales and Top Album Sales chart at number 51 and number 80, respectively. It also made its debut on the UK R&B Albums Chart at number 32.

== Track listing ==
Trying Not to Think About It track listing
No.	Title	Writer(s)	Producer(s)	Length
1.	"World of Sunshine" (Intro)	Joanna Levesque; Jordan Orvosh	Jordan XL	2:42
2.	"Anxiety (Burlinda's Theme)"	Levesque; Kennedi Lykken; Robert McCurdy; Christopher Petrosino	Noise Club	4:05
3.	"Dissolve"	Levesque; Thomas Lumpkins; Isabella Sjöstrand; Dernst Emile II	D’Mile	3:31
4.	"Good Enough" (Interlude)	Levesque; Nikki Flores	Nikki Flores	2:08
5.	"B.I.D."	Michael Holmes; Gracie Ella	DZL	3:07
6.	"Feel Alright"	Levesque; Elijah Blake; Bianca Atterberry; Rob Grimaldi	Rob Grimaldi	2:56
7.	"Fresh New Sheets"	Levesque; Flores	Nikki Flores	4:59
8.	"Sugar & Carbs" (Interlude)	Levesque	Levesque	0:21
9.	"Spiral SZN"	Levesque; Nate Cyphert; Riley Biederer; Grimaldi	Rob Grimaldi	2:48
10.	"Nikki's Sound Bath" (Interlude)	Levesque; Flores	Nikki Flores	0:48
11.	"Worst (I Assume)"	Levesque; Tiara Thomas; Carl McCormick; Kelvin Wooten	Cardiak; Kelvin Wu10	3:08
12.	"Lift"	Levesque; James Droll; Caroline Baker	Caroline Baker	2:23
Total length:				32:56

== Personnel ==
Credits were adapted from the album's liner notes.

=== Musicians ===
- JoJo – lead vocals, background vocals, writing, producer
- Nikki Flores – background vocals, writing, recording
- Tommy Parker – background vocals

=== Technical ===
- Jordan Orvosh – writing
- Jordan XL – producer
- Xu Zhu – recording
- Tyler Scott – mixing
- David K. Younghyun – mixing engineer, mixing assistant
- Kennedi Lykken – writing
- Robert McCurdy – writing
- Christopher Petrosino – writing
- Noise Club – producer, recording
- Thomas Westly Lumpkins – writing
- Isabella Sjöstrand – writing
- Dernst "D'Mile" Emile II – writing, producer, recording
- Donaldson "DC" Cenatus – mixing
- Michael Holmes – writing
- Gracie Ella – writing
- DZL – producer
- Elijah Blake – writing
- Bianca "Blush" Atterberry – writing
- Rob Grimaldi – writing, producer
- JinJoo Lee – guitar
- MoDre – bass
- Katsuya Sezaki – guitar recording
- Nate Cyphert – writing
- Riley Biederer – writing
- Tiara Thomas – writing
- Carl McCormick – writing
- Kelvin Wooten – writing
- Cardiak – producer
- Kelvin Wu10 – producer
- Randy Urbanski – recording
- James Droll – writing
- Caroline Baker – writing, producer, recording
- John Lowell Anderson – mixing engineer assistant
- Doug Krantz – packaging design
- Alfredo Flores – photographer
- Dale Becker – mastering

== Charts ==
Weekly chart performance
Chart (2021)	Peak position
UK Album Downloads (OCC)	56
US Top Album Sales (Billboard)	80

== Release history ==
List of release dates and formats
Region	Date	Format(s)	Label	Ref.
Various	October 1, 2021	Digital download; streaming	Warner; Clover	
Various	October 15, 2021	CD	Warner; Clover	
Various	November 18, 2022	Vinyl	Warner; Clover	
