= December Baby =

Studio album by JoJo
- Released: October 30, 2020
- Recorded: 2020
- Genre: Christmas
- Length: 27:34
- Labels: Clover; Warner
- Producers: BLVK; JordanXL

JoJo chronology
Good to Know (2020)	December Baby (2020)	Trying Not to Think About It (2021)

Singles from December Baby
- 1. "The Christmas Song" Released: December 13, 2019; 2. "Wishlist" Released: November 18, 2020; 3. "December Baby" Released: December 8, 2020

December Baby is the first Christmas album and the fifth studio album by American singer JoJo. It was released on October 30, 2020, through Clover Music and Warner Records. The album contains cover versions of popular Christmas standards such as "The Christmas Song" and "Have Yourself a Merry Little Christmas" alongside original songs which incorporate R&B elements.

The album was recorded during quarantine over a three week period, in part with Agápē producer and writer Austin Brown, with whom she wrote all of the original tracks. The album also saw her reunite with previous collaborator JordanXL, who worked with JoJo on her 2010 mixtape Can't Take That Away from Me and on the 2018 re-recordings of her earlier studio albums. BLVX handled additional production on the album. To support the album, JoJo appeared in the "December Baby Livestream Concert Special", an online performance special which aired live from The Roxy Theater in Los Angeles. The album produced three singles: "The Christmas Song", "Wishlist" featuring PJ Morton, and the album's title track "December Baby".

== Background ==
Following the release of the deluxe edition of JoJo's fourth studio album, Good to Know. JoJo later announced that in mid-2020 during the COVID-19 pandemic, she was working on her first Christmas album. On social media, JoJo noted that she has always wanted to release a Christmas album.

== Promotion ==
On December 18, 2020, JoJo performed a livestream concert of the album from The Roxy in Los Angeles to promote the record while maintaining COVID-19 protocols. JoJo made a promotional appearance on The Tamron Hall Show to promote the album and performed “Wishlist” alongside PJ Morton. She also hosted her own online live performance special called the "December Baby Livestream Concert Special", presented by NoCap, which aired live from The Roxy Theater in Los Angeles. December Baby live at the ROXY NoCap, love stream concert.

=== Singles ===
Following the release of JoJo's third album Mad Love. in 2016 on Atlantic Records, JoJo transferred to Warner Records and issued her first commercially released Christmas song "The Christmas Song". The song was digitally released as the album's lead single on December 13, 2019, exclusively through Amazon Music as a part of a slate of holiday-themed Amazon Original songs. The song's accompanying music video was released alongside the single release. "Wishlist" featuring PJ Morton was released on November 15, 2020, as the second single. "December Baby" was released as the final single from the album on December 8, 2020.

== Track listing ==
Credits were adapted from Spotify.

No.	Title	Writer(s)	Producer(s)	Length
1.	"Noelle" (featuring Jacob Collier)	Traditional	BLVK	0:43
2.	"Have Yourself a Merry Little Christmas"	Hugh Martin; Ralph Blane	Jordan XL	3:50
3.	"O Come All Ye Faithful" (Interlude)	Traditional	BLVK	0:55
4.	"December Baby"	Joanna Levesque; Brian Wiggins; Nathaniel Austin Brown	BLVK	3:18
5.	"Coming Home"	Levesque; Wiggins; Brown	BLVK	2:26
6.	"The Christmas Song"	Robert Wells; Mel Tormé	Jordan XL	2:39
7.	"Deck the Halls" (Interlude)	Thomas Oliphant	BLVK	0:29
8.	"Wrap Me Up"	Levesque; Wiggins; Brown	BLVK	2:14
9.	"North Pole"	Levesque; Wiggins; Brown	BLVK	2:53
10.	"What Child Is This" (Interlude)	William Chatterton Dix	BLVK	0:48
11.	"Silent Night"	Franz Xaver Gruber; Joseph Mohr	Jordan XL	2:35
12.	"Wishlist" (featuring PJ Morton)	Levesque; Wiggins; Brown; Billy Steinberg; Josh Alexander; PJ Morton	BLVK	3:57
13.	"We Wish You a Merry Christmas" (Interlude)	Jr.naver	BLVK	0:40
Total length:				27:34

== Personnel ==
Adapted from AllMusic and the album liner notes.

- Benjamin Backus – Arranger
- Dale Becker – Mastering
- Ralph Blane – Composer
- BLVK – Producer
- Austin Brown – Guitar, Mixing, Recording, Vocals (Background)
- Jacob Collier – Featured Artist, Recording, Vocals
- William C. Dix – Lyricist
- Brian Gardner – Mastering
- Ryan Gladieux – Mixing, Recording
- JoJo – Primary Artist, Vocals, Composer
- Brian London – Keyboards, Mixing, Recording, Vocals (Background)
- Hugh Martin – Composer
- PJ Morton – Featured Artist, Vocals, Composer
- Joel Smallbone – Arranger
- Luke Smallbone – Arranger
- Tedd Tjornhom – Arranger
- Mel Tormé – Composer
- Traditional – Composer
- Robert Wells – Composer
- Jordan XL – Producer, Programmer
