= Sexy to Me =

Promotional single by JoJo
- Released: February 28, 2012
- Length: 2:55
- Label: Blackground; Streamline; Interscope
- Songwriters: Joanna "JoJo" Levesque; Nathaniel Hills; James Washington; Marcella Araica; Kenna
- Producer: Danja

"Sexy to Me" is a song recorded by American singer JoJo. It was written by JoJo, James Washington, Marcella Araica, Kenna and Nathaniel "Danja" Hills, who also produced the song.

== Background and composition ==
"Sexy to Me" was written by Marcella Araica, Nathaniel Hills, Joanna Levesque, James Washington and Kenna Zemedkun, with the production helmed by Danja. It was used for the PerfectaWash campaign for Clearasil for which JoJo was the spokesperson.

Levesque described the song as "a sassy record that's empowering." The song has been described as a club track with a heavy bass and "squealing, dissonant synths." It plays over a grinding beat and the lyrics feature themes of self-empowerment and female autonomy. In an interview with Idolator, she described the lyrical references to Michael Jackson: "I was fascinated by him. I mean, for an artist to say that they weren’t inspired by Michael Jackson — what’s wrong with you? He set the precedent."

== Critical reception ==
Sam Lansky of MTV Buzzworthy praised "Sexy to Me" for its production and lyrics, describing it as a "major banger". Robbie Daw of Idolator writes " 'Sexy To Me' is a throbbing jam that lives up to its title, but for us the true sexiness arrives with the wash of synths during the last 40 seconds or so." Writers at RapUp.com praised the song as a "confident club-ready cut", writing "JoJo gets her swagger back on the Danja-produced "Sexy to Me". RyanSeacrest.com wrote that "this new club track will make you want to get up out of your seats and drop a few moves!"

== Release history ==
List of release dates with formats and record labels
Country	Release date	Format	Label
United States	February 28, 2012	Digital download	Blackground/Streamline/Interscope Records
Canada	February 28, 2012	Digital download	Blackground/Streamline/Interscope Records
Mexico	February 28, 2012	Digital download	Blackground/Streamline/Interscope Records
