= Good to Know =

2020 studio album by JoJo

- Standard cover

Studio album by JoJo
- Released: May 1, 2020
- Studios: Swara Padi (Ubud Bali, Indonesia); Westlake (Los Angeles, California); Blackwood (Los Angeles, California); Melrose Sound (Los Angeles); Goddess Sound (North Hollywood, California); Encore (Burbank, California); Red Bull (Santa Monica, California)
- Genres: Pop; R&B
- Length: 29:33 (digital edition); 35:17 (physical edition)
- Labels: Clover; Warner
- Producers: 30 Roc; A Pluss; Beatgodz; DatBoiSqueeze; Lido; Fade Majah; Doc McKinney; Noise Club; Dylan Wiggins

JoJo chronology
The High Road (2018) (2018)	Good to Know (2020)	December Baby (2020)

Singles from Good to Know
- 1. "Man" Released: March 13, 2020

Good to Know (stylized in all lowercase) is the fourth studio album by American singer-songwriter JoJo. Released on May 1, 2020, it marked her first studio album since leaving Atlantic Records and launching her own record label imprint, Clover Music, through a joint venture with Warner Records. The album reflects JoJo's efforts to process past experiences and develop a greater sense of self-understanding. Conceived during a period of personal transition, it was shaped by her personal life and was intended to encourage listeners to reflect on their own emotional patterns.

Good to Know is a pop and R&B record characterized by slow- to mid-tempo songs, layered vocal harmonies, and an atmospheric production style. Its structure is divided into three thematic sections—moving from escapism and self-numbing behaviors to self-reflection and, ultimately, self-acceptance. Good to Know incorporates bass-driven arrangements, while its lyrics explore themes of independence, sexuality, and introspection. It also contains an R&B-oriented sound and an emphasis on mood over conventional pop structures.

Good to Know was supported by the lead single "Man", followed by three promotional singles—"Lonely Hearts", "Comeback", and "Small Things". A deluxe edition featuring additional tracks and an acoustic version were released in 2020, while plans for the Good to Know Tour were canceled due to the COVID-19 pandemic. Upon release, Good to Know received positive reviews from critics, who highlighted its cohesive sound, vocal performances, and emphasis on mood and introspection. Commercially, the album reached number 22 in Portugal, 33 on the US Billboard 200, and 78 in Scotland.

== Background and inspiration ==
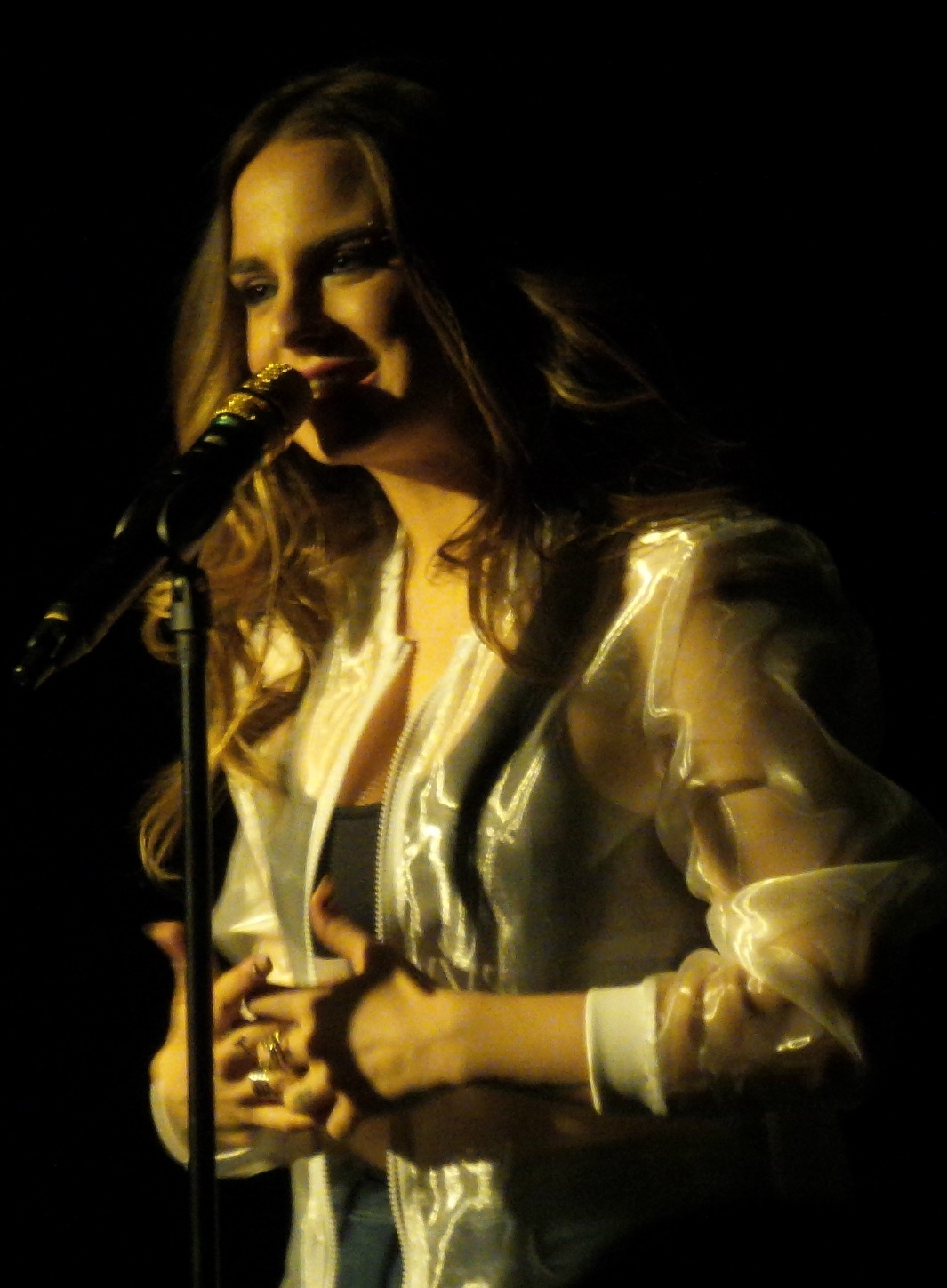
JoJo in 2015

Following years of contractual disputes with Blackground Records and its imprint Da Family Entertainment, American singer JoJo experienced a decade-long gap between her second and third studio albums. After releasing her third studio album, Mad Love, through Atlantic Records in 2016, she later said that she felt "misunderstood" and not fully "heard". She subsequently left Atlantic, launched her own imprint Clover Music in partnership with Warner Records, and re-recorded her first two albums in 2018 after Blackground had removed them from streaming services.

The title of Good to Know reflects the value of learning from feedback and criticism, and was inspired by her awareness of sharing intimate details in her songwriting. JoJo associated the title with accepting the present moment, referencing her friend Thundercat's comment: "It is what it is. It's good to know." She also explained that it reflected a growing sense of confidence and acceptance at the end of the album's creation, stating: "I feel more confident and I feel like it's all good. You know what I mean? That's kind of where I landed at the end of making this album, and that's what 'Good to Know' means."

Good to Know primarily explores themes of sex and sensuality, despite JoJo having abstained from sex while writing the album in 2019. (Note: In an interview with Entertainment Weekly published May 1, 2020, JoJo said that she began writing the album "a year ago".) JoJo intended the record to encourage listeners to reflect on their own behavior and emotional patterns. According to her, Good to Know draws from her "inspirations, [her] patterns, [her] fantasies and what makes [her] feel good"; its writing process helped her "find [her] voice" and regain a sense of control. She stated to The Line of Best Fit that Good to Know involved feelings of shame, guilt, and dishonesty related to a past relationship, while it reflects an effort to understand herself and become more comfortable with her identity. Speaking with Bustle, JoJo shared that she felt some parts of the album were "an overshare", particularly in its depiction of her emotions and sexuality. She characterized the record as an effort toward self-acceptance centered on confronting her feelings.

== Composition ==
Good to Know is a pop and R&B album influenced by the hip-hop styles of Canadian artists such as the Weeknd, Tory Lanez, and Drake. The album draws inspiration from JoJo's experiences visiting strip clubs while recording in Toronto and Atlanta. According to her, Good to Know is "for people who like to get a little emo, who like sensuality, who like hard-ass beats". Its songs are generally slow- to mid-tempo and feature densely packed, breathy vocal phrasing, layered harmonies, and an atmospheric, bass-driven production style.

Good to Know is structured in three parts; the opening section depicts attempts to "numb" oneself, followed by a middle portion focused on recognizing the need for independence and breaking unhelpful patterns. The final section centers on self-love and coming to terms with past experiences. These structural phases explore themes of independence and self-reflection, reflecting a period in JoJo's life that she has associated with self-sabotaging behavior and an instance of infidelity while intoxicated. Consequently, she noted that parts of the album resemble "journal excerpt-y" material.

=== Songs ===
"So Bad"
The opening track "So Bad" incorporates distorted piano and 808-driven production.

As noted by Variety's A.D. Amorosi, the "silken, spacy" song "So Bad" contains "aquatic keyboards" and "thud-knocking beats". Exploring themes of sex, escapism, and relationships that recur throughout Good to Know, its lyrics concentrate on a late-night relationship with a partner depicted as unreliable. The second track, "Pedialyte", likewise references coping mechanisms—including substance use—and nightlife, which portray attempts to avoid confronting the aftermath of a failed relationship. Incorporating unconventional percussion and a coordinated melody, "Gold" is a mid-tempo R&B and pop song, (Note: Brittany Spanos of Rolling Stone characterized the song's genre as "midtempo R&B-pop", Layla Halabian of Nylon described it as "sexy R&B track", and Sajae Elder of The Fader called it a "mid-tempo" song.) with lyrics that convey insecurity and dissatisfaction.

"Man" is a self-love track, described as a "single-lady anthem" by Aimee Cliff of The Guardian. It adopts Latin-influenced guitar elements. JoJo characterized the song as a "cocky, cute bop" centered on confidence and independence rather than romantic dependence. "Small Things" is an acoustic ballad about emotional restraint and the difficulty of suppressing feelings following a breakup, while "Lonely Hearts" is a subdued song about a one-sided relationship. In "Think About You", JoJo discusses an ex-partner she struggles to move on from. A piano-driven track with a light and breezy tone, it contains prominent bass and sampled elements alongside its arrangement. Featuring vocals from Tory Lanez and 30 Roc, "Comeback" incorporates rap verses; Amorosi described the song as "positively X-rated". The digital edition's closing track, "Don't Talk Me Down", contains "tender vocals" and a "string-laden" arrangement, according to Nick Smith of MusicOMH. Critics highlighted its stripped-back production, featuring classical piano, strings, and minimal processing.

== Promotion and release ==
On February 21, 2020, JoJo announced that her album, titled Good to Know, was scheduled to be released later that year. The album was released on May 1 through JoJo's imprint label Clover Music in partnership with Warner Records; it was her first studio release through these labels since departing Atlantic Records. While the digital edition is composed of nine tracks, the physical CD edition includes "Bad Habits" and "Proud" as an intro and outro, respectively. The lead single, "Man", was released on March 13. Its accompanying music video, directed by Marc Klasfeld, premiered the same day and features her various female friends like Tinashe, Ari Lennox, Francia Raisa, JoJo Gomez, and JinJoo Lee. JoJo subsequently released three additional music videos, starting with "Lonely Hearts" on April 28, directed by Zelda Williams. "Comeback" and "Small Things", released respectively on May 8 and June 23, were both directed by Santiago Salviche.

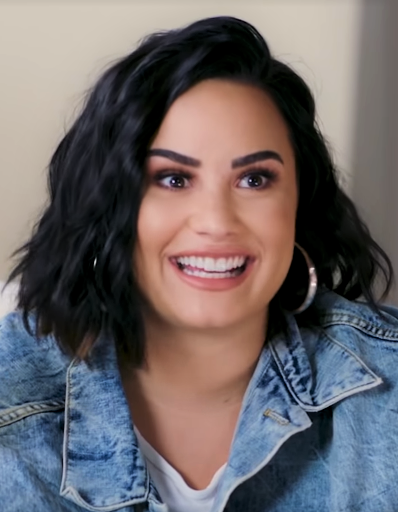
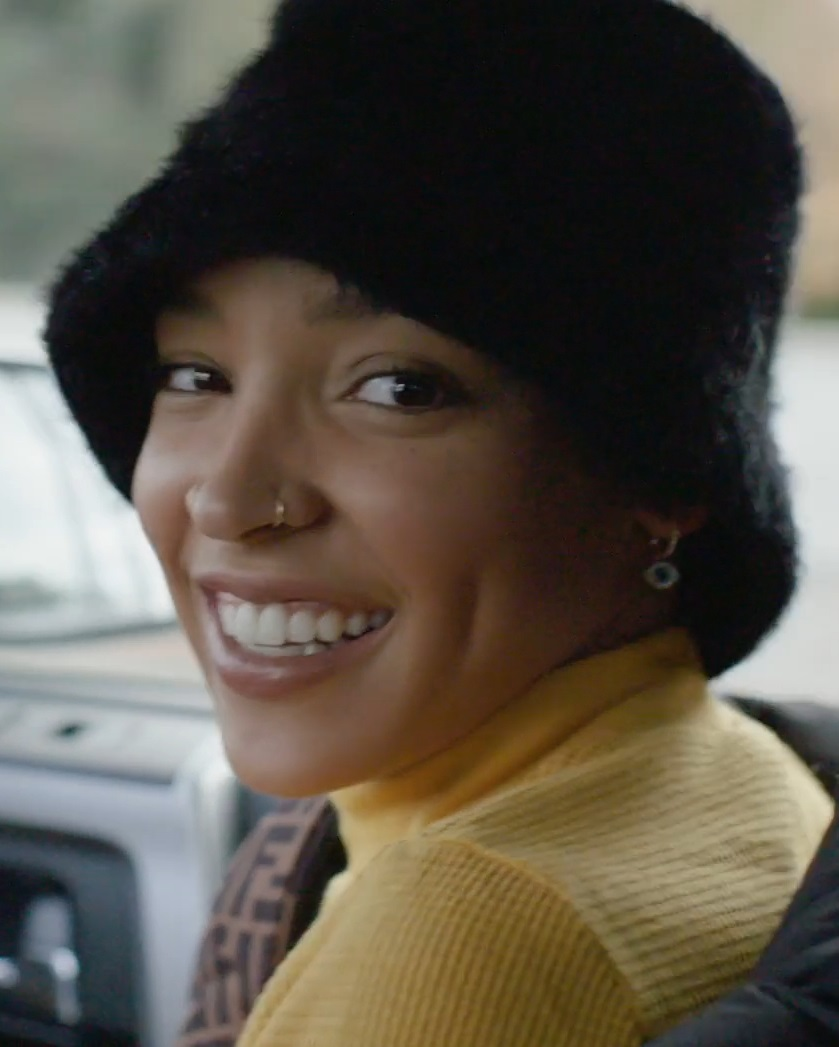
American singers Demi Lovato (left) and Tinashe (right) are featured on the album's deluxe edition.

On July 10, JoJo issued an acoustic version of Good to Know alongside a music video of "Think About You", directed by Williams. She then unveiled a remix version of "Lonely Hearts", which features American singer Demi Lovato, on August 5. A deluxe edition followed on August 28, including the Demi Lovato remix, "In Your Room", "X (1 Thing Wrong)", "Kiss", and "Love Reggae", featuring American singer Tinashe. However, a verse from Tory Lanez on "Comeback" was omitted following his shooting of American rapper Megan Thee Stallion. Prior to the release, JoJo confirmed the decision on her Twitter after a fan asked why Lanez was absent from the project, replying that she had "took [Lanez] TF off". About the incident, JoJo further stated: "It felt like the right and necessary thing to do, out of respect and love for Meg."

JoJo celebrated the first anniversary of Good to Know with a live performance a year after its release. Upon release, the album debuted at number 33 on the US Billboard 200 with 12,700 album-equivalent units in its first week, which consisted of 8,000 pure album copies and 3,400 streaming units. It also charted at number 19 on the US Top R&B/Hip-Hop albums chart. In the United Kingdom, Good to Know reached number 4 on the UK R&B Albums chart, peaking at numbers 78 and 22 in Scotland and Portugal, respectively. The album lasted a week on the charts in United States, Scotland, and Portugal.

=== Tour ===
On February 21, 2020, JoJo announced her plan to embark on a worldwide headlining and third major world tour in support of the album, titled Good to Know Tour. It was planned to travel throughout North America and Europe with the first leg of the tour, beginning on April 21 at the Showbox in Seattle. The tour was scheduled to continue across Europe in the following months, beginning in Dublin, Ireland on August 31, before concluding on September 25 in Stockholm, Sweden. However, she stated that it had been postponed due to the COVID-19 pandemic. In January 2021, she announced that the tour was canceled due to the unpredictable nature of the pandemic.

In October 2021, JoJo began a six-date tour of the United States, titled the Trying Not to Think About It Tour, in support of her sixth studio album, Trying Not to Think About It. She also announced the subsequent tour JoJo Tour 2022 to support Good to Know and Trying Not to Think About It. She stated: "It felt so right being back onstage for those dates in October, and I can't wait to do it on a bigger scale in more cities next year!" The tour's first leg began on February 24, 2022, in Portland, Oregon, United States, concluding in Ottawa, Ontario on April 16.

== Critical reception ==
Professional ratings
Review scores
Source	Rating
The Guardian	4/5 stars
The Irish News	8/10
Metro Weekly	3/5 stars
MusicOMH	4/5 stars
RapReviews	7.5/10

Good to Know received general acclaim from music critics. Writing for Variety, A.D. Amorosi described the album as reflecting a more developed artistic identity, highlighting its blend of subdued vocals, synthesized textures, and rhythmic elements. He compared its sound to an updated take on Janet Jackson's 1986 album, Control. In a review for Metro Weekly, Sean Maunier noted that JoJo leans more strongly into R&B than in her previous work, pointing to its production and emphasis on mood over conventional pop structures. RapReviews author Steve 'Flash' Juon argued that although Good to Know incorporates hip hop influences and benefits from JoJo's work as a co-producer on much of the album, it remains rooted in R&B rather than hip hop. Describing her as an "adult R&B singer", he suggested that while hip hop is "not her genre per se", she could effectively cross over into it through collaborations with rappers and producers.

Reviewers also addressed Good to Know's vocal performances and songwriting. Nick Smith of MusicOMH highlighted JoJo's vocal delivery across the record, describing "Don't Talk Me Down" as a standout for its restrained arrangement and dynamic performance. He also noted stylistic variety in tracks such as "Man" and "Small Things", while suggesting that some of the record's more explicit lyrical moments could detract from the material. Similarly, Maunier emphasized her vocal confidence, particularly on songs like "Gold" and "Small Things", where she showcases some of her strongest vocal performances.

The Good to Know's themes and tone were another focus of commentary. In The Guardian, Laura Snapes characterized it as centered on self-knowledge and independence, with a reflective tone shaped by reassessing past experiences. Edd Dracott of The Irish News also noted a balance between introspective material and more accessible tracks, highlighting its combination of reflective themes with R&B and dance production elements. Some critics commented on Good to Know's cohesion and overall approach; Maunier considered its "tighter" production an improvement over Mad Love, though he observed that the songs place less emphasis on immediate memorability. Smith similarly noted that the album prioritizes atmosphere and tone, particularly in its latter half, and resulted in a consistent but occasionally understated listening experience.

== Track listing ==
Digital edition
No.	Title	Writer(s)	Producer(s)	Length
1.	"So Bad"	Joanna Levesque; Merna Bishouty; Chantal Kreviazuk; Martin McKinney; Dylan Wiggins	Doc McKinney; Wiggins; JoJo^{[c]}; Bishouty^{[c]}	3:11
2.	"Pedialyte"	Levesque; James Norton; Peder Losnegard; Enrico Pieranunzi; Silvano Chimenti; Tobias Brewer	Lido^{[d]}	4:06
3.	"Gold"	Levesque; Kennedi Lykken; Joelle James; Robert McCurdy; Christopher Petrosino; Asheton Hogan	A Pluss; Noise Club; Lido^{[b]}	2:26
4.	"Man"	Levesque; Lauren LaRue; Rodrick Doss Jr.; Evon Barnes; Sofia Quinn; Chelsea Lena; Cameron Lazar	Beatgodz; Fade Majah; JoJo^{[c]}; Tommy Parker^{[c]}	2:53
5.	"Small Things"	Levesque; Brandon Skeie; Caroline Ailin; McCurdy; Petrosino; Hogan; Ishmael Windley	A Pluss; Noise Club; Wow Jones^{[b]}; JoJo^{[c]}; Parker^{[c]}	3:24
6.	"Lonely Hearts"	Levesque; Elizabeth Lowell Boland; Bishouty; McKinney; Wiggins	Doc McKinney; Wiggins; JoJo^{[c]}; Bishouty^{[c]}	3:23
7.	"Think About You"	Levesque; Andrew Jackson; Losnegard	Lido; JoJo^{[c]}	3:48
8.	"Comeback" (featuring Tory Lanez and 30 Roc)	Levesque; LaRue; Samuel Gloade; Daystar Peterson; Adarius Morgane	30 Roc; DatBoiSqueeze; JoJo^{[c]}	2:55
9.	"Don't Talk Me Down"	Levesque; Natalie Dunn; Losnegard	Lido; Johan Lenox^{[b]}; JoJo^{[c]}; Dunn^{[c]}	3:27
Total length:				29:33

Physical edition
No.	Title	Writer(s)	Producer(s)	Length
1.	"Bad Habits (Intro)"	Levesque; Jordan Orvosh; Jason Gilbert; Sebastian Kole	Jordan XL; JoJo^{[c]}	1:09
2.	"So Bad"	Levesque; Bishouty; Kreviazuk; McKinney; Wiggins	Doc McKinney; Wiggins; JoJo^{[c]}; Bishouty^{[c]}	3:11
3.	"Pedialyte"	Levesque; Norton; Losnegard; Pieranunzi; Chimenti; Brewer	Lido^{[d]}	4:06
4.	"Gold"	Levesque; Lykken; James; McCurdy; Petrosino; Hogan	A Pluss; Noise Club; Lido^{[b]}	2:26
5.	"Man"	Levesque; LaRue; Doss Jr.; Barnes; Quinn; Lena; Lazar	Beatgodz; Fade Majah; JoJo^{[c]}; Parker^{[c]}	2:53
6.	"Small Things"	Levesque; Skeie; Ailin; McCurdy; Petrosino; Hogan; Windley	A Pluss; Noise Club; Wow Jones^{[b]}; JoJo^{[c]}; Parker^{[c]}	3:24
7.	"Lonely Hearts"	Levesque; Boland; Bishouty; McKinney; Wiggins	Doc McKinney; Wiggins; JoJo^{[c]}; Bishouty^{[c]}	3:23
8.	"Think About You"	Levesque; Jackson; Losnegard	Lido; JoJo^{[c]}	3:48
9.	"Comeback"	Levesque; LaRue; Gloade; Morgane	30 Roc; DatBoiSqueeze; JoJo^{[c]}	3:30
10.	"Don't Talk Me Down"	Levesque; Dunn; Losnegard	Lido; Lenox^{[b]}; JoJo^{[c]}; Dunn^{[c]}	3:27
11.	"Proud (Outro)"	Levesque; Lykken; Jamie Hartman; Losnegard; Brandon Wollman	Lido; Santell^{[a]}; JoJo^{[c]}	3:19
Total length:				35:17

Deluxe edition
No.	Title	Writer(s)	Producer(s)	Length
1.	"Bad Habits (Intro)"	Levesque; Orvosh; Gilbert; Kole	Jordan XL; JoJo^{[c]}	1:09
2.	"So Bad"	Levesque; Bishouty; Kreviazuk; McKinney; Wiggins	McKinney; Wiggins; JoJo^{[c]}; Bishouty^{[c]}	3:11
3.	"Pedialyte"	Levesque; Norton; Losnegard; Pieranunzi; Chimenti; Brewer	Lido^{[d]}	4:06
4.	"Gold"	Levesque; Lykken; James; McCurdy; Petrosino; Hogan	A Pluss; Noise Club; Lido^{[b]}	2:26
5.	"Man"	Levesque; LaRue; Doss Jr.; Barnes; Quinn; Lena; Lazar	Beatgodz; Fade Majah; JoJo^{[c]}; Parker^{[c]}	2:53
6.	"Small Things"	Levesque; Skeie; Ailin; McCurdy; Petrosino; Hogan; Windley	A Pluss; Noise Club; Wow Jones^{[b]}; JoJo^{[c]}; Parker^{[c]}	3:24
7.	"Lonely Hearts" (remix; featuring Demi Lovato)	Levesque; Boland; Bishouty; McKinney; Wiggins	Doc McKinney; Wiggins; JoJo^{[c]}; Bishouty^{[c]}	3:23
8.	"Think About You"	Levesque; Jackson; Losnegard	Lido; JoJo^{[c]}	3:48
9.	"Comeback"	Levesque; LaRue; Gloade; Morgane	30 Roc; DatBoiSqueeze; JoJo^{[c]}	3:30
10.	"Don't Talk Me Down"	Levesque; Dunn; Losnegard	Lido; Lenox^{[b]}; JoJo^{[c]}; Dunn^{[c]}	3:27
11.	"Proud (Outro)"	Levesque; Lykken; Jamie Hartman; Losnegard; Wollman	Lido; Santell^{[a]}; JoJo^{[c]}	3:19
12.	"Kiss"	Levesque; Lykken; McCurdy; Petrosino	Noise Club	3:09
13.	"Love Reggae" (featuring Tinashe)	Levesque; Tinashe Kachingwe; Brittany "Chi" Coney; Denisia "Blu June" Andrews; Faris Al-Majed; Nevin Sastry; Richard Munos; The ANMLS	Nova Wav; Sastry; The ANMLS	3:27
14.	"What U Need"	Levesque; Coney; Andrews; Matias Saabye Peschcke-Køed	Nova Wav	4:08
15.	"X (1 Thing Wrong)"	Levesque; Ben Shapiro; Daniel Hackett; Diana Gordon; Felicia Ferraro; Nima Jahanbin; Paimon Jahanbin	Kid Culture; Wallis Lane	3:23
16.	"In Your Room"	Levesque; Bishouty; Boland; Adam Fujiki; McKinney; Michael Sonier; Wiggins; Daniel Wilson	Wiggins; Doc McKinney; Sonier	2:56
Total length:				51:39

=== Notes ===
- ^{^[a]} signifies a co-producer.
- ^{^[b]} signifies an additional producer.
- ^{^[c]} signifies a vocal producer.
- ^{^[d]} "Pedialyte" contains elements from "Feasing" written by Silvano Chimenti and Enrico Pieranunzi, and "Surf Club 76BPM" written by Tobias Brewer. The outro contains a hidden track titled "Take Me" commencing at approximately three minute and fourteen seconds (3:14) into the track.

== Credits and personnel ==
Credits were adapted from the liner notes. (Note: All track numbers refer to the physical release of the album.)

=== Recording locations ===
- Swara Padi Studios; Ubud Bali, Indonesia (track 1)
- Westlake Studios; Los Angeles, California (tracks 2, 7, 10)
- Blackwood Studios; Los Angeles, California (tracks 3, 5)
- Melrose Sound; Los Angeles, California (tracks 4, 6)
- Goddess Sound; North Hollywood, California (track 8)
- Encore Studios; Burbank, California (track 9)
- Red Bull Studios; Santa Monica, California (track 11)

=== Personnel ===
- 30 Roc – producer (track 9)
- A Pluss – producer (tracks 4, 6), programming (track 6)
- Beatgodz – producer (track 5)
- Dale Becker – mastering (all tracks)
- Merna Bishouty – vocal producer (tracks 2, 7)
- Daniel Brooks – engineer (track 8), additional engineering (track 6)
- Stephen "Thundercat" Bruner – bass (track 11)
- Jon Castelli – mixing (track 1)
- Miles Comaskey – mix engineer (tracks 5, 8, 10)
- DatBoiSqueeze – producer (track 9)
- Natalie Dunn – vocal producer (track 10)
- Wissam Ghorayeb – engineer (track 5)
- Jason Gilbert – engineer (track 1)
- Ryan Gladieux – engineer (tracks 2–7, 9, 10), mixing (track 11)
- JoJo – vocals (all tracks), vocal producer (all tracks)
- Najeeb Jones – assistant mix engineer (tracks 3, 4, 6, 7)
- Wow Jones – additional production (track 6)
- Jordan XL – producer, instruments, and programming (track 1)
- Johan Lenox – additional production (track 10)
- Lido – producer (tracks 3, 8, 10, 11), additional production (track 4)
- Fade Majah – producer (track 5)
- Tony Maserati – mixing (tracks 2–10)
- Rob McCurdy – guitar (track 6)
- Doc McKinney – producer (tracks 2, 7)
- James Musshorn – engineer (track 11)
- Noise Club – producer (tracks 4, 6), programming (track 6)
- Tommy Parker – vocal producer (tracks 5, 6)
- Chris Petrosino – keyboards (track 6)
- Santell – co-producer (track 11)
- Tyler Scott – mix engineer (tracks 2, 9)
- Dylan Wiggins – producer (tracks 2, 7)
- Jamar Williams – engineer (track 8)
- David K. Younghyun – assistant mix engineer (track 4)

== Charts ==
Chart performance
Chart (2020)	Peak position
Portuguese Albums (AFP)	22
Scottish Albums (Official Charts)	78
UK R&B Albums (Official Charts)	4
UK Albums Sales (OCC)	44
UK Album Downloads (Official Charts)	18
US Billboard 200	33
US Top R&B/Hip-Hop Albums (Billboard)	19

== Release history ==
Release dates and formats
Region	Date	Format(s)	Edition	Label(s)	Ref.
Various	May 1, 2020	Digital download; streaming	Digital	Warner; Clover	
Various	May 1, 2020	CD	Physical	Warner; Clover	
Various	July 10, 2020	Digital download; streaming	Acoustic	Warner; Clover	
Various	August 28, 2020	Digital download; streaming; vinyl	Deluxe	Warner; Clover	
