= Man (JoJo song) =

Single by JoJo

from the album Good to Know
- Released: March 13, 2020
- Studio: Blackwood (Los Angeles); Mirrorball (North Hollywood); Becker Mastering (Pasadena)
- Genre: Pop; R&B
- Length: 2:54
- Label: Clover; Warner
- Songwriters: Joanna Levesque; Chelsea Lena; Evon Barnes; Lauren LaRue; Rodrick Doss Jr.; Sofia Quinn
- Producers: Beatgodz; Fade Majah

JoJo singles chronology
"Sabotage" (2019)	"Man" (2020)	"Damage Is Done" (2020)

Music video
- "Man" on YouTube

"Man" is a song recorded by American singer and songwriter JoJo. It was released March 13, 2020 as the lead single for JoJo's fourth studio album, Good to Know (2020). The song was written by JoJo, alongside Chelsea Lena, Evon Barnes, Lauren LaRue, Rodrick Doss Jr. and Sofia Quinn. It was produced by Beatgodz and Fade Majah. "Man" impacted American contemporary hit radio on April 14, 2020.

== Background ==
Prior to the release of "Joanna" a separate release plan for the album's lead singles were initially planned. The song was officially released on October 11, 2019 with the song's music video premiering the following day, with JoJo announcing the release of "Sabotage" at the conclusion of the videos premiere as the official lead single from her upcoming album. The music video for the song premiered on December 4, 2019 and included a snippet of the album's next single planned at the time which would eventually be "Small Things". During the 2020 Grammy Awards pre-show JoJo officially announced the release of "Small Things" as the album's next single set for release on February 21, 2020. On February 19, 2019 two days away from the song's intended release JoJo announced that they had made changes to the song's release and would go forward with "Man" as the new lead single from the album with another major announcement to come on the intended single's release date. JoJo officially announced her fourth studio album would be titled "Good to Know" and released corresponding tour dates in promotion for the album.

"Man" was then officially released on March 13, 2020 as the new single from Good to Know (2020), While describing the song, JoJo explains that "Now's the time to be ur own biggest fan. Pleeeeeez don't waste ur time til u find someone who can truly compliment ur fly and go hard as u do. Being single and making a life you love is too delicious to settle for less."

== Composition ==
"Man" is a mid-tempo pop and R&B song with lyrics in which JoJo declares her self-confidence and desire to find a lover who can reciprocate her affections. Billboard found the song demonstrated the singer becoming comfortable in her own skin. "Man" was written by Cameron Lazar, Chelsea Lena, Evon Barnes, Jr., Lauren LaRue, Rodrick Doss Jr., Sofia Quinn and Joanna "JoJo" Levesque for the latter's long awaited fourth studio album Good to Know (2020). It was produced by Beatgodz, who also worked alongside Fade Majah on it. The track was recorded with guidance by Ryan Gladieux and additional recording completed by Wissam Ghorayeb. The mixing of "Man" was done by Tony Maserati while the song's mixing engineering was done by Miles Comaskey and eventually, the mastering was done by Dale Becker. JoJo and Tommy Parker both served as the vocal producers for the song.

== Critical reception ==
″Mike Nied of Idolator wrote that "There's a smoothness to JoJo's always exceptional voice" on "Man" and that he "cannot get enough of the self-assured lyrics." Brittany Spanos of Rolling Stone described the song as "classic JoJo". Kyle Denis of Black Boy Bulletin noted that the song "does a solid job at defining Jojo's sound for her upcoming album" but "the percussion and melody of the hook are strikingly similar to Kiana Ledé’s “Ex.”"

== Music video ==
The video for "Man" was released on March 13, 2020 and features cameos from Ari Lennox, Tinashe, JinJoo, Francia Raisa, and JoJo Gomez. Scenes of JoJo performing sultry choreography in a dark room are interspersed with scenes of her partying with the aforementioned co-stars. Heran Mamo of Billboard wrote that the video captures the idea of friendship, as a third interpretation of love, to complement the self-love and romantic love described in the song's lyrics.

== Track listing ==
Digital download

1. "Man" – 2:54

Digital download – Remix

1. "Man" (Hoodboi Remix) – 3:56

2-track single

1. "Man" (acoustic) – 2:43
2. "Man" – 2:54

== Credits and personnel ==
Credits adapted from the liner notes of Good to Know.

- JoJo – vocals, writing, vocal production
- Tommy Parker – vocal production
- Cameron Lazar – writing
- Chelsea Lena – writing
- Evon Barnes, Jr. – writing
- Lauren LaRue – writing
- Rodrick Doss Jr. – writing
- Sofia Quinn – writing
- Tony Maserati – mixing
- Miles Comaskey – mixing engineer
- Ryan Gladieux – recording
- Wissam Ghorayeb – recording
- Beatgodz – producer
- Fade Majah – producer
- Dale Becker – audio mastering

== Charts ==
Chart performance for "Man"
Chart (2020)	Peak position
US Pop Airplay (Billboard)	38
US R&B Digital Songs (Billboard)	6
US R&B/Hip-Hop Digital Songs (Billboard)	16

== Release history ==
Release history and formats for "Man"
Country	Date	Format	Version	Label	Ref.
Various	March 13, 2020	Digital download; streaming	Original single	Clover Music; Warner	
Various	April 9, 2020	Digital download; streaming	Remix	Warner	
United States	April 14, 2020	Contemporary hit radio	Original single	Warner	
Various	May 29, 2020	Streaming	2-track single	Clover; Warner	
