= JoJo (singer) =

American singer and songwriter (born 1990)

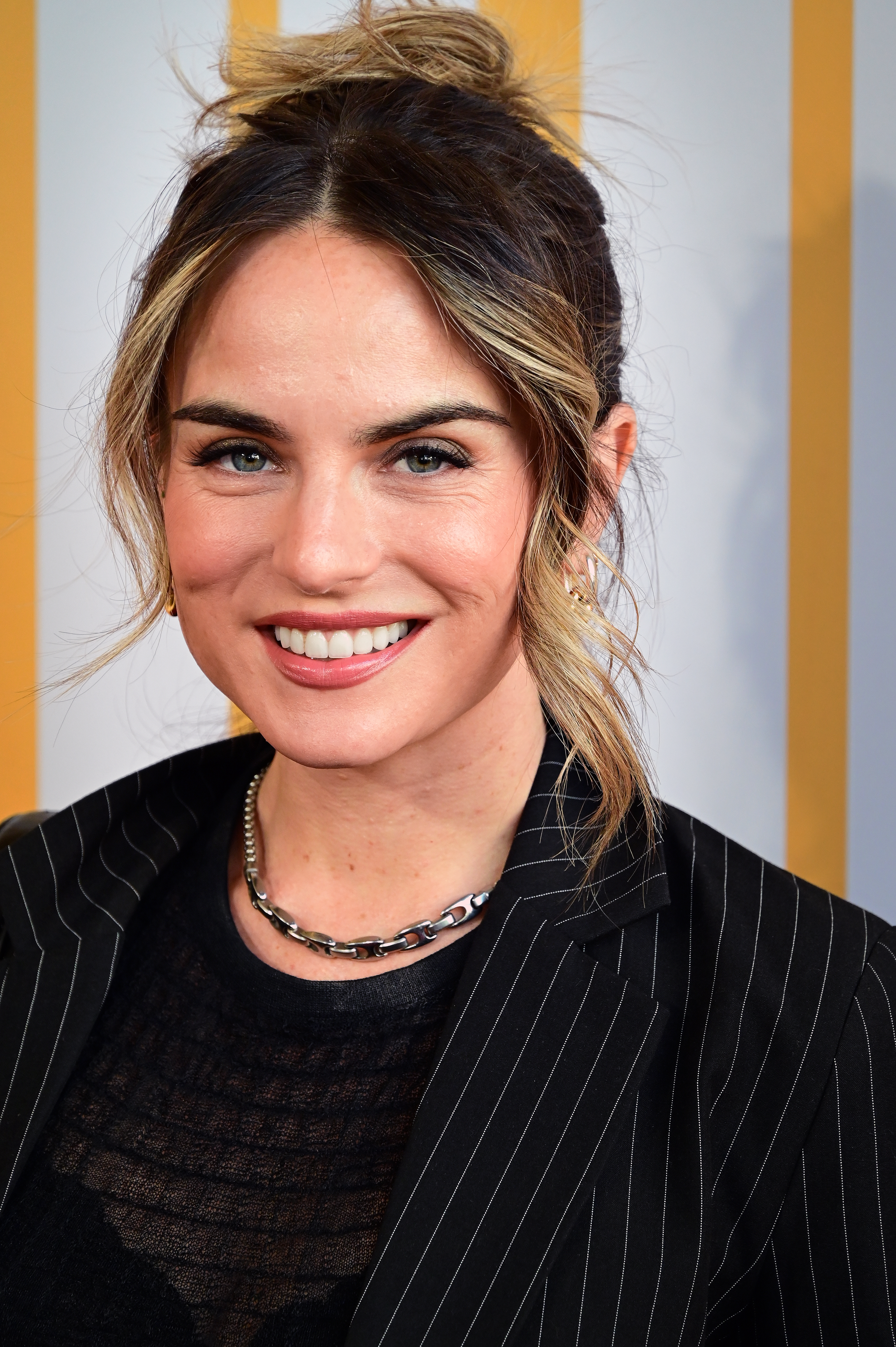
- JoJo in 2026
- Born: Joanna Noëlle Levesque; December 20, 1990 (age 35); Brattleboro, Vermont, U.S.
- Occupations: Singer; songwriter; actress
- Years active: 1998–present
- Works: Discography; songs; videography; tours
- Musical career
- Origin: Foxborough, Massachusetts, U.S.
- Genres: R&B; pop; soul; hip-hop
- Instruments: Vocals; piano
- Labels: Blackground; Da Family; Universal; Wagram; Universal Motown; V2; Interscope; Streamline; Atlantic; Clover Music; Warner; BMG
- Website: iamjojoofficial.com

Joanna Noëlle "JoJo" Levesque (la-VEK; born December 20, 1990) is an American singer, songwriter, and actress. She began performing in singing competitions and local talent shows as a child. In 2003, record producer Vincent Herbert noticed her after she competed on the television show America's Most Talented Kids and asked her to audition for his record label Blackground Records. After signing with the label, JoJo released her debut studio album JoJo in 2004. It peaked at number four on the U.S. Billboard 200 and was later certified platinum by the Recording Industry Association of America (RIAA), selling over four million copies worldwide to date.

With her debut single "Leave (Get Out)" peaking atop the U.S. Billboard Mainstream Top 40 chart, JoJo, aged just 13 at release, became the youngest solo artist in history to top the chart. The song peaked at 12 on the Billboard Hot 100 and was certified gold by the RIAA along with its follow-up single "Baby It's You". Her second studio album The High Road (2006) spawned her first top-five Hot 100 hit "Too Little Too Late". The album was later certified gold, selling over three million copies worldwide. By 2007, JoJo had sold more than seven million records worldwide, including 2.1 million albums in the United States.

Record label disputes delayed JoJo from commercially releasing her third studio album; she released two mixtapes independently, Can't Take That Away from Me (2010) and Agápē (2012). After her contractual release, JoJo signed with Atlantic Records in 2014 and released her first commercial EP III (2015), followed by her third studio album Mad Love (2016), which became her third top-ten album in the U.S. She left Atlantic in 2017 and founded her record label Clover Music through a joint venture with Warner Records, where she re-recorded and re-released her debut and second albums as the label's first project in 2018. In 2020, JoJo released her fourth and fifth studio albums Good to Know and December Baby, followed by her sixth studio album Trying Not to Think About It in 2021.

In addition to her music career, JoJo has also pursued an acting career. In 2006, she made her on-screen feature film debut in Aquamarine and later starred in R.V.. She has also had guest appearances on the television shows The Bernie Mac Show (2002), American Dreams (2004), Romeo! (2006), Hawaii Five-0 (2011) and Lethal Weapon (2017). Other films JoJo has appeared in include the Lifetime television film True Confessions of a Hollywood Starlet (2008) and G.B.F. (2013). Her Broadway credits include starring in Moulin Rouge! The Musical.

== Early life ==
Joanna Noëlle Levesque was born on December 20, 1990, in Brattleboro, Vermont, but raised in Foxborough, Massachusetts. She is of Polish, French and Irish descent. Her father, Joel Maurice Levesque (January 8, 1955 – November 14, 2015), sang as a hobby, and her mother, Diana Levesque (née Blagden) sang in a Catholic Church choir and was trained in musical theater. JoJo's parents divorced when she was four years old, and she was raised as an only child by her mother. The name JoJo was a childhood nickname. As a child, JoJo listened as her mother practiced hymns. She started singing when she was two years old by imitating everything from nursery rhymes to R&B, jazz, and soul tunes. She also enjoyed attending Native American festivals and acted locally in professional theaters.

In 1998, JoJo appeared on the television show Kids Say the Darndest Things: On the Road in Boston with American comedian and actor Bill Cosby, and she sang a song by singer Cher. In 1999, she auditioned on the television show Destination Stardom, singing Aretha Franklin's 1967 hit "Respect" and "Chain of Fools". In 2001, JoJo recorded a demo disc titled Joanna Levesque which features covers of soul and R&B songs. The following year, she performed on Maury during a "kids-with-talent" episode.

== Career ==
=== 2003–2005: JoJo ===
In mid-2003, JoJo competed on the television show America's Most Talented Kid (losing to Diana DeGarmo). Record producer Vincent Herbert contacted her and asked her to audition for Blackground Records.

In 2003, at age 12, JoJo signed with Blackground Records and its imprint Da Family Entertainment and began working with producers for her first album. JoJo's gold-certified debut single "Leave (Get Out)" was released in 2004. Following the single's release, JoJo embarked on her first tour, the Cingular Buddy Bash with pop rock singer Fefe Dobson, hip hop duo Young Gunz, rap rock band Zebrahead, and teen pop stars Ryan Cabrera and Busted. It stopped at nine malls, starting at Atlanta's Northlake Mall and ending at South Shore Plaza near her hometown of Foxborough. When the single reached number one on the Mainstream Top 40 chart, she became, at age thirteen, the youngest solo artist to have a number-one single in the United States. The first single was nominated for Best New Artist at the 2004 MTV Video Music Awards, which made JoJo the youngest MTV Video Music Award nominee. Her first album, the platinum-selling JoJo, was released in 2004, peaking at number four on the U.S. Billboard 200 and number ten on the Top R&B/Hip-Hop Albums, selling 95,000 copies in its first week and reaching the top forty of the UK Albums Chart. In September 2004, JoJo released her second single, the gold-selling "Baby It's You". The single version of the song features rapper Bow Wow. It peaked at number twenty-two in the U.S. and number eight in the UK. The final single from the album, "Not That Kinda Girl", was released in 2005 and peaked at number eighty-five in Germany.

In December 2004, she was nominated for Female New Artist of the Year and Mainstream Top 40 Single of the Year at the Billboard Music Awards, becoming the youngest artist ever to be nominated at the awards. Later that month, JoJo was requested by First Lady Laura Bush to perform on the 2004 Christmas in Washington special. In 2005, JoJo participated in "Come Together Now", a charity single to benefit the victims of the 2004 Asian tsunami and the 2005 Hurricane Katrina. JoJo hosted and performed at the Hope Rocks Concert in 2005 to benefit City of Hope National Medical Center. In 2005, she was offered a role on the Disney Channel television series Hannah Montana, but she turned down the role in favor of developing her music career.

=== 2006–2007: The High Road and acting ===
In 2006, JoJo was cast opposite Emma Roberts and Sara Paxton in Aquamarine, playing Hailey. The film opened on March 3, 2006, opening at number five with $7.5 million. Her second major film, RV, a comedy starring Robin Williams, was released on April 28, 2006. It opened at number one and grossed $69.7 million.

JoJo's second album, The High Road, was released on October 17, 2006. The album debuted at number three on the Billboard 200, selling 108,000 units. It was produced by Scott Storch, Swizz Beatz, J. R. Rotem, Corey Williams, Soulshock & Karlin and Ryan Leslie. Received mainly positive reviews, the album was preceded by the release of the single "Too Little Too Late" in the summer of 2006. "Too Little Too Late" broke the record for the biggest jump into the top three on the Billboard Hot 100 chart, moving from number 66 to number three in one week; this record was previously held by Mariah Carey with her 2001 single "Loverboy", which went from number 60 to number two. The album's second single, "How to Touch a Girl", experienced less success. It charted just outside the Billboard Hot 100 and peaked at number 76 on the Billboard Pop 100. "Anything" was released as the third single and charted moderately in the UK. The album sold over 550,000 copies and was certified gold by the RIAA in December 2006.

As of 2007, JoJo's records including 2.1 million albums in the United States had been sold worldwidely over seven million. On July 20, JoJo's version of "Beautiful Girls" by Sean Kingston leaked on the internet titled "Beautiful Girls Reply". One month later, it was released as a promotional single and debuted at number thirty-nine on the Billboard Rhythmic Top 40 chart. In late 2007, JoJo stated that she would be writing songs for her third album, to be released when she turned 18. She said she wanted her fans to "see growth" in her music.

=== 2008–2013: Label troubles, Can't Take That Away from Me, and Agápē ===
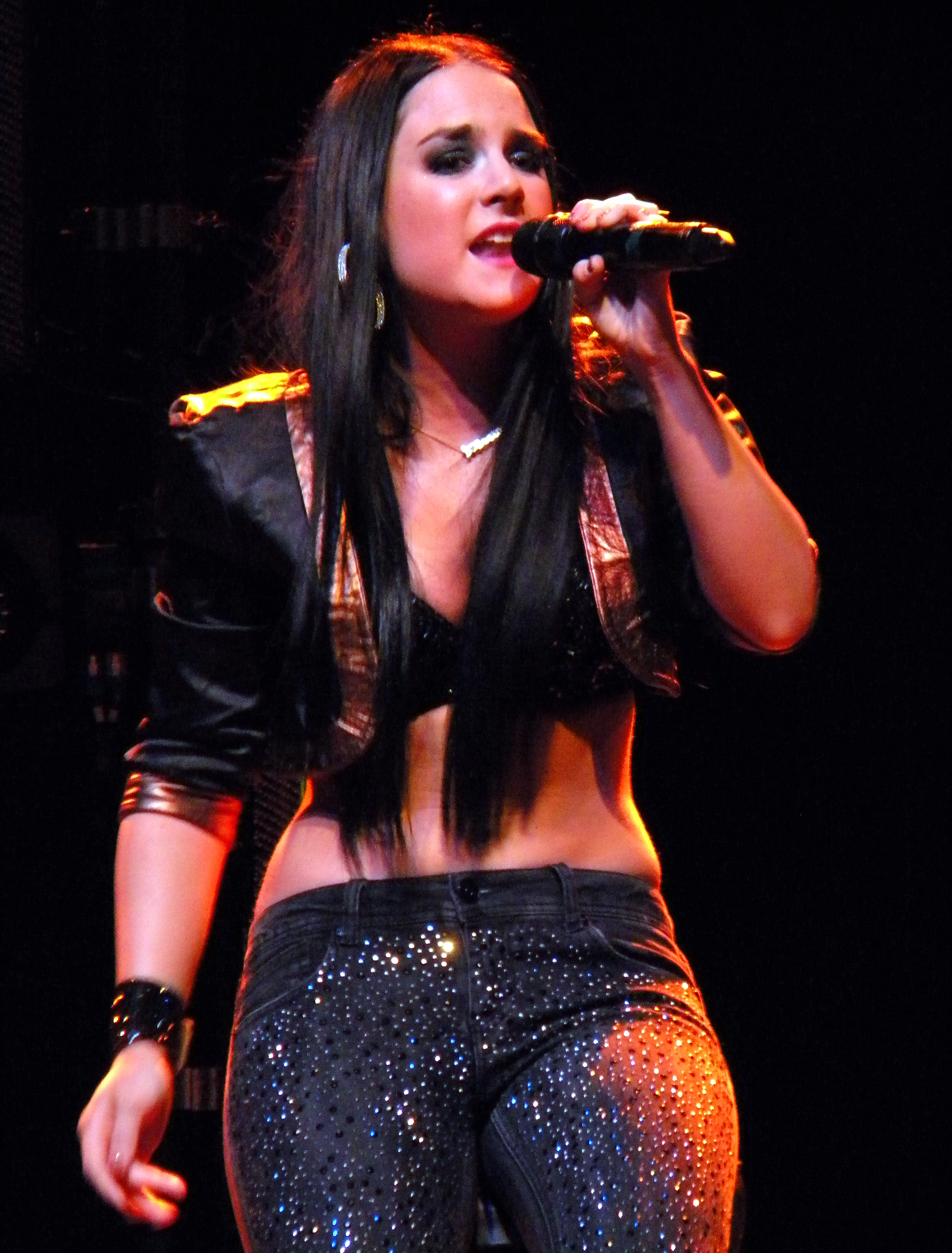
JoJo performing as the opening act on the Joe Jonas & Jay Sean Tour in Atlanta, Georgia, on October 3, 2011

In an April 2008 interview, JoJo stated that she was writing and producing an upcoming album in Boston and Atlanta. On August 30, 2008, JoJo posted her own version of the song "Can't Believe It", originally performed by T-Pain. In August 2008, JoJo played the role of Morgan Carter in True Confessions of a Hollywood Starlet which was broadcast on Lifetime Television. On June 3, 2009, JoJo stated on her YouTube account that she was waiting for her record label to sign a distribution deal to release her album which was to be titled All I Want Is Everything. In August 2009, JoJo filed a lawsuit against her record label Blackground Records and its imprint Da Family Entertainment for putting her in musical limbo. She reportedly sought $500,000 for damages and to be released from her contract. In October 2009, JoJo reached a deal with Blackground Records and her third album was to be distributed by Interscope Records. In late 2009, JoJo appeared on Timbaland's Shock Value II as a featured artist on the song "Lose Control" and as a background vocalist on "Timothy Where You Been" from the same album with the Australian band Jet.

In September 2010, JoJo released her first mixtape Can't Take That Away from Me which spawned the single "In the Dark". In late 2010, JoJo made cameo appearances in music videos for Keri Hilson and Clinton Sparks. In January 2011, JoJo was cast in an episode of CBS's Hawaii Five-0. In February 2011, JoJo announced that she had changed the title of her third studio album from All I Want Is Everything to Jumping Trains. She also announced that her upcoming single would be titled "The Other Chick" and that a music video for the song was in production. However, neither the video or single were officially released, with JoJo citing that both her and her label had a desire to move forward with a promotional push for a different song, following her recording of new material. In June 2011, she released a re-interpretation of rapper Drake's song "Marvin's Room", renamed "Marvin's Room (Can't Do Better)" through Rap-Up's YouTube channel. Drake himself expressed his appreciation for her interpretation.

On August 29, 2011, "Disaster" was released to U.S. radio. The song saw her continue in a similar style to her previous hits, which was praised by critics for not "jumping on the synthpop bandwagon", but also criticized for not showing much progression after a five-year hiatus. "Disaster" debuted on the Billboard Hot 100 at number 87, but fell off the chart the next week. The single failed to impact any chart internationally. In support of the single, she opened for the Joe Jonas & Jay Sean Tour. JoJo gave her first televised performance of the song on Good Day Dallas on September 29, and later performed on a small promotional tour for "Pinktober". A music video for the song premiered on JoJo's website in November 2011. In August 2011, JoJo signed a promotional deal with HeartSoul clothing to become the new face for their Fall/Winter collection. In December 2011, JoJo signed a deal with skin care brand Clearasil to become the new spokeswoman for Clearasil's PerfectaWash.

In October 2012, JoJo was cast and began working on the film G.B.F. JoJo was cast as Soledad Braunstein who is the President of the Gay Straight Alliance. The film was shot in Los Angeles over 18 days by director Darren Stein. In early 2012, JoJo toured with Big Time Rush for five dates of their Better with U Tour. A promotional single, "Sexy to Me", was made available for purchase on iTunes and Amazon on February 28, 2012. JoJo, wanting to go in a new direction with her third studio album, premiered "Demonstrate", produced by Noah "40" Shebib, on July 17, 2012. It was intended to be the new lead single from Jumping Trains, but its commercial and radio release as a single was eventually scrapped despite a music video having been filmed.

After Blackground Records lost their distribution deal through Interscope Records in late 2012, resulting once again in the delay of the release of an album, JoJo began recording new material specifically for a new mixtape to be released by the end of the year, as she "didn't want to keep the fans waiting for new music any longer". On November 15, 2012, she announced the release of a mixtape, titled Agápē, which means "unconditional love" in Greek. The project was released for free through digital download on her 22nd birthday on December 20, 2012. In support of the mixtape, JoJo embarked on her first headlining North American tour, The Agápē Tour. "We Get By" was released as the lead single from the mixtape on November 15, 2012. "André" was released as the second single from the mixtape on November 30, 2012; a music video for the song premiered on March 21, 2013, through Complex magazine.

=== 2014–2018: Label changes, III., Mad Love and re-recording albums ===
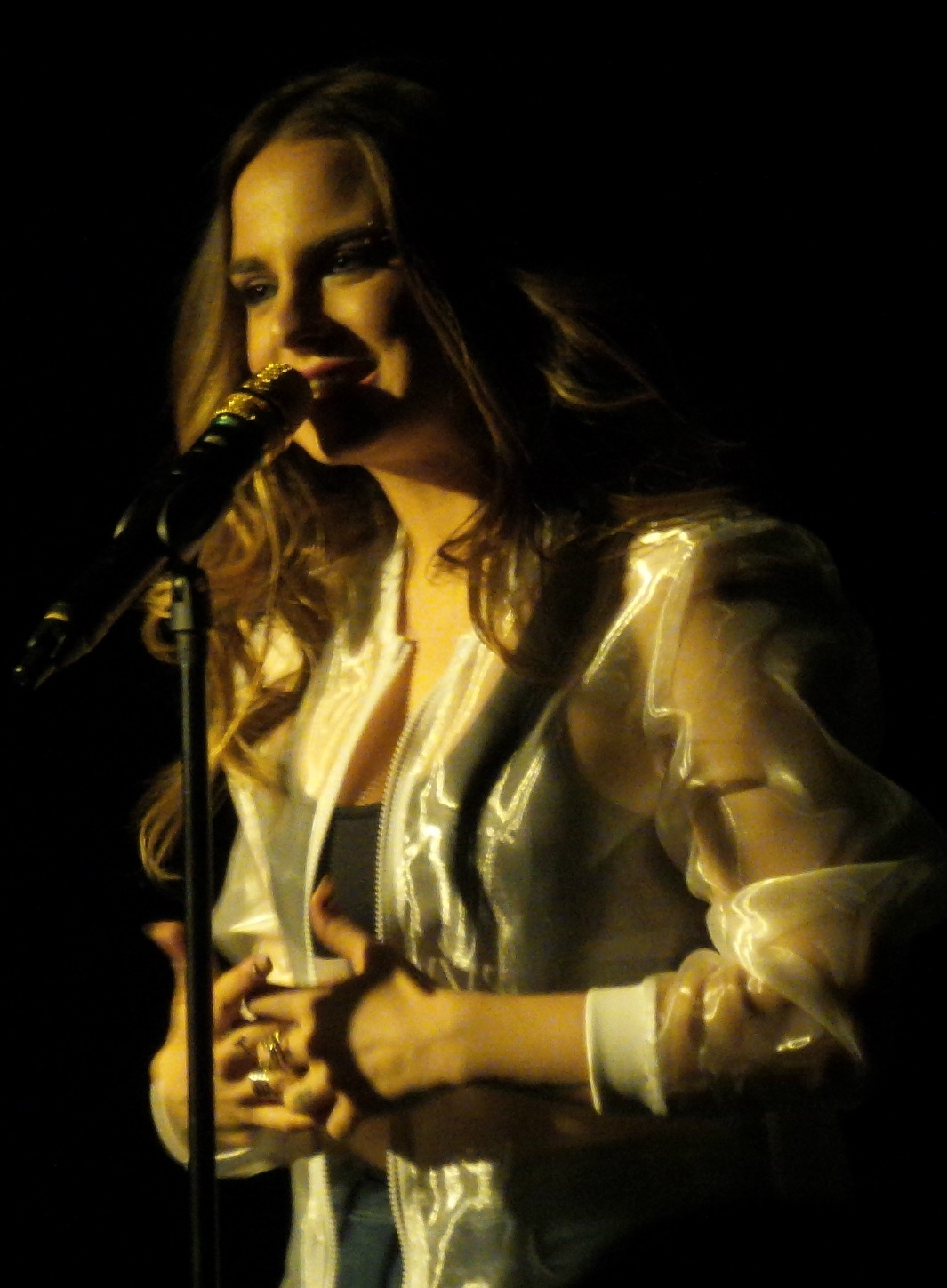
JoJo performing on the I Am JoJo Tour in Atlanta, Georgia, on December 4, 2015

On July 30, 2013, it was reported that JoJo had filed a lawsuit against her labels Blackground Records and Da Family for "irreparable damages to her professional career". She claimed that her 2004 contract with the labels should have expired in 2011, as she was a minor when it was signed and minors cannot sign contracts that last more than seven years under New York State law. In December 2013 both of JoJo's and Blackground's attorneys agreed to drop the case as both parties came to an agreement outside court. On January 14, 2014, it was announced that JoJo was released from her multi-year battle with the label and signed a new recording contract with Atlantic Records. On February 14, she released an extended play, titled #LoveJo, featuring covers of three classic songs, which were all produced by Da Internz. On March 16, 2014, she performed at SXSW.

On August 5, 2015, JoJo's website under Atlantic was relaunched. On August 20, 2015, JoJo released three singles simultaneously on the III extended play, which she referred to as a "tringle", as a preview of her third studio album. In support of the release, JoJo embarked on the I Am JoJo Tour, her first world tour, in November 2015. On December 18, 2015, JoJo released the sequel to #LoveJo, titled #LoveJo2.

In May 2016, JoJo received co-writing credits on the single "Free Somebody" by Luna. In June 2016, Fifth Harmony announced that JoJo would be one of the opening acts on their 7/27 Tour. On July 27, 2016, JoJo released the lead single "Fuck Apologies", featuring rapper and label mate Wiz Khalifa. Mad Love, JoJo's third studio album was released on October 14, 2016, ten years following the release of The High Road. JoJo received co-writing credits on every track on the album. The album entered and peaked on the Billboard 200 chart at number 6. In January 2017, JoJo embarked on the Mad Love tour, a four-month concert tour of North America and Europe.

In August 2017, JoJo announced her departure from Atlantic, in conjunction with announcing her new music venture, Clover Music, in a joint deal with Interscope. In April 2018, she announced the Leaks, Covers, & Mixtapes tour, which began on May 29. On December 21, 2018, JoJo released new versions of her debut album and The High Road, as well as her singles "Demonstrate", and "Disaster" – all with re-recorded vocals and slightly reworked production. The albums were the first releases from Clover Music, which was later announced have transitioned affiliation from Interscope to Warner Records.

=== 2019–2022: Good to Know and Trying Not to Think About It ===
On February 14, 2019, JoJo and R&B singer-songwriter PJ Morton released the single "Say So", a duet. "Say So" was included as the lead single on Morton's album Paul. On October 11, 2019, JoJo released the single "Joanna" alongside a music video for the song. On October 25, JoJo collaborated with Alabama rapper Chika on the single "Sabotage", which was intended to be the first single from her next album.

On May 1, 2020, JoJo released her fourth studio album Good to Know. Like her previous record, JoJo again co-wrote every song on the album. The lead single "Man" was released on March 13, 2020. On August 7, 2020, JoJo released "What U Need" as the lead single from the deluxe version of Good to Know, which followed on August 28, 2020. A tour supporting the album was set to begin in April 2021, but was later canceled due to the COVID-19 pandemic. On October 2, 2020, she released "The Change", written by Diane Warren, to serve as the official anthem for the Joe Biden 2020 presidential campaign. On October 30, 2020, JoJo released her first holiday album and fifth studio album December Baby.

In 2021, JoJo competed on the fifth season of The Masked Singer as "Black Swan". She finished in second place and was the first female runner-up on the show. On September 24, 2021, Blackground Records and Empire Distribution re-released JoJo's original debut album and The High Road to streaming services. The re-releases took JoJo by surprise. JoJo does not profit financially from these re-releases and she instead encouraged fans to listen to her 2018 re-recordings of the albums instead, writing on Twitter: "A stream of the re-recorded 2018 version supports me and helps me continue to do what I love. Streaming the original unfortunately does not."

On October 1, 2021, JoJo released her sixth studio album Trying Not to Think About It, which was preceded by the single "Worst (I Assume)". It was followed by a six-date tour which started the next day. The album was further promoted through the 42-date world tour, JoJo Tour 2022, which began the following year. JoJo contributed to Stan Walker's 2022 album All In, collaborating on the song "Remember Us", which she also co-wrote.

=== 2023–present: Broadway, Over the Influence and NGL ===
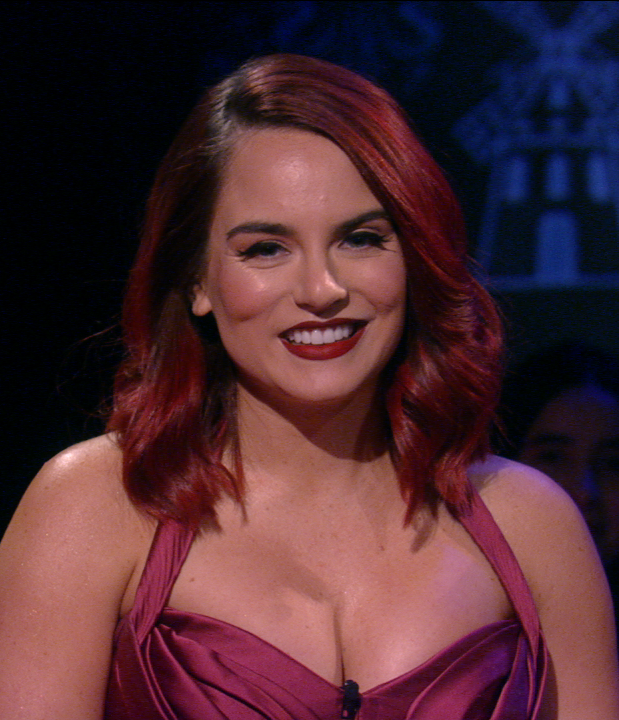
JoJo in 2023

On April 11, 2023, JoJo made her Broadway debut in the leading role of Satine in Moulin Rouge! The Musical opposite Derek Klena. On February 9, 2024, she released a cover of the REO Speedwagon single, "Can't Fight This Feeling". The single was featured in the 2024 film Lisa Frankenstein, directed by JoJo's friend and sometime-collaborator, Zelda Williams. A music video was released the day before, interspersing clips from the film and JoJo performing the song in a recording studio.

On March 7, 2024, JoJo announced in an interview with People at the Billboard Women in Music event plans to release new music later that year, as well as her first memoir. On September 17, 2024, Over the Influence: A Memoir was released. "Porcelain" was released on October 2 of the same year, in a joint venture between Clover Music and BMG Rights Management. The following month, she released "Too Much to Say". Her fourth extended play NGL was released on January 24, 2025. On July 11, 2025, JoJo's collaboration with British singer Craig David, "In It With You", was released.

She reprised her role of Satine opposite Aaron Tveit on Broadway from July 23 to October 13, 2024. In June 2026, she was set to take over the role of Florence Vassy from Lea Michele in the Broadway revival of Tim Rice, Björn Ulvaeus, and Benny Andersson's musical Chess opposite Tveit and Nicholas Christopher at the Imperial Theatre. However, the production later announced it’d close on June 21.

== Artistry ==
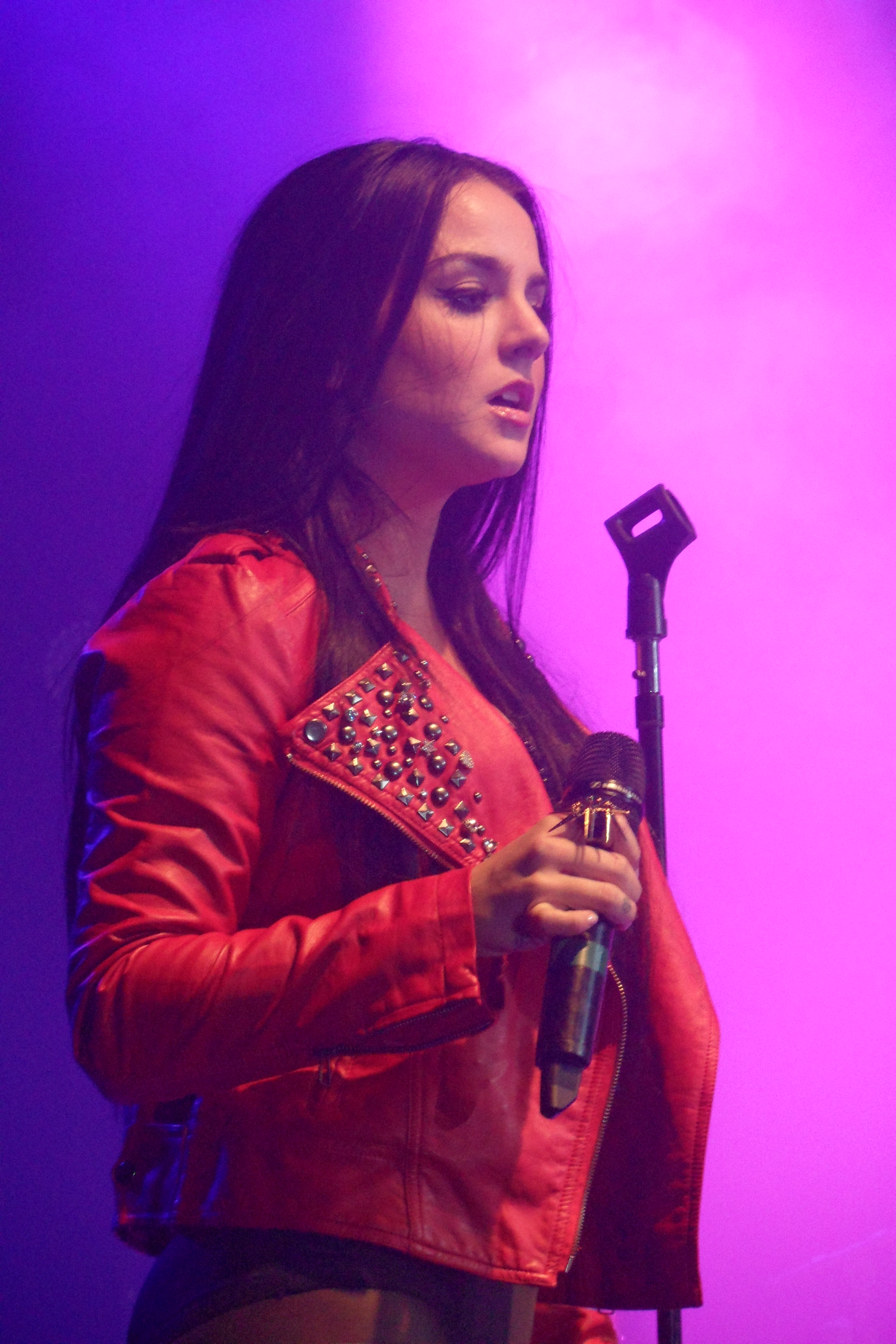
JoJo in 2011

JoJo is considered to be primarily a pop and R&B artist; however, the majority of her singles tend to lean more towards the former as a marketing tool. Prefix's Norman Meyers observed that "As an adolescent white girl singing mainstream R&B, her singles have leaned toward pop to snag sales ... But the list of producers on The High Road ... shows that Jojo is more concerned with harder beats and soulful sounds." JoJo's voice type is soprano and her singing voice has been widely acclaimed by music critics, one of whom ranked it among "the best in the game", while her R&B recordings have been compared to the likes of R&B singers Brandy and Monica. Describing her as a "vocal phenom", Entertainment Weekly's Leah Greenblatt enthused that JoJo is "capable of Mariah Carey-style upper-register flourishes". Vocally, critics frequently draw comparisons between JoJo and singers Kelly Clarkson and Beyoncé, while Slant Magazine's Sal Cinquemani remarked that the singer "could very well be the next Teena Marie".

At times some of her material and use of melisma has been criticized for being overproduced and overused, respectively. Emma Morgan of Yahoo! Music dismissed JoJo as "mercilessly multi-tracked à la J. Lo, her voice encoded flatteringly as she too-many-notes her way through a succession of R'n'B beats and hooks that owe everything to studio wizardry and little to simple songwriting", lacking experience and soul. While admitting that JoJo is "surprisingly adept at frenzied, sexually possessed hollering", Alex Macpherson of The Guardian believes that the singer "is, however, at her best when compulsively dissecting emotional situations straight out of high-school movies via the medium of big, heartfelt choruses". Pegging JoJo as "a teen-pop star with an R&B singer's voice", Kelefa Sanneh of The New York Times continued, "she can outsing much of the competition, but it also means more ballads ... and more not-quite-credible lovesick lyrics." JoJo's earliest memories of singing are performing songs by Etta James, Ella Fitzgerald, Mariah Carey and Whitney Houston for customers in hair salons. Her mixtape, Agápē, was influenced by musicians Joni Mitchell and James Taylor.

JoJo possessed a coloratura mezzo-soprano vocal range, which Jordan Riefe of Maxim described as "better suited to R&B." Upon making her mainstream debut in 2004, critics immediately noticed that JoJo's vocal prowess and material exceeded her age. When she released her single "Demonstrate" in 2012, critics observed that both the singer's voice and lyrics had matured alongside her. Subsequently, JoJo's second mixtape Agápē drew attention from both critics and the singer's own family due to its mature content; the mixtape features lyrical references to drinking, drug abuse and sex, which were absent from her previous "G-rated" releases. The mixtape also addresses her conflict with her record label. JoJo's early image followed popular trends related to hip hop culture at the time. The cover of JoJo's first album features the singer donning a T-shirt and cap, which Sal Cinquemani of Slant Magazine dismissed as "contrived and calculated". Matt Collar of AllMusic wrote, "Jojo is an assured and likeable performer who can somehow embody the yin-yang persona of a suburban cheerleader slinging hip-hop attitude." According to Jenny Eliscu of Rolling Stone, the singer "has become a role model to suburban adolescents who talk gangsta but still carpool to school in mom's Kia Sorento."The Guardian's Alex Macpherson commented that "In an era of boozy Amys, gobby Lilys and flashing Britneys, a pop star as wholesome as JoJo seems almost quaint." Writing for Prefix, Norman Meyers believes that JoJo "could have been a Mean Girls extra, but she has talent" and "comes off more like a pint-size Mariah Carey or Christina Aguilera than a hip-shaking Britney clone".

== Personal life ==
JoJo lived in Edgewater, New Jersey with her mother, until age 18, when she moved out, living in Boston on her own for a year. As of 2014, she resided in Los Angeles. JoJo dated American soccer player Freddy Adu from May 2005 until September 2006. The couple met on the MTV show Fake ID Club while JoJo was hosting it. JoJo made an appearance in the commentary box at a New England Revolution home game when they were playing D.C. United. In November 2006, The Washington Post reported that the couple had split up. JoJo revealed on American Top 40 with Ryan Seacrest that she and Adu were still good friends.

In August 2009, JoJo graduated from high school and stated that she would stay focused on future projects. She was accepted to Northeastern University and considered majoring in cultural anthropology but did not attend. Aside from singing and acting, JoJo is also a supporter of various charitable organizations such as Boys & Girls Clubs of America, World Vision International, She's the First, Make-A-Wish Foundation, and others. In December 2021, JoJo announced her engagement to Saved by the Bell (2020) actor Dexter Darden. The pair broke off their engagement the following year.

== Discography ==
- JoJo (2004)
- The High Road (2006)
- Mad Love (2016)
- Good to Know (2020)
- December Baby (2020)
- Trying Not to Think About It (2021)

== Filmography ==
=== Films and television films ===
Year	Title	Role	Notes
2002	Developing Sheldon	Young Elizabeth	
2006	Aquamarine	Hailey Rogers	
2006	RV	Cassie Munro	
2006	JoJo: The Pop Princess	Herself	Documentary
2008	True Confessions of a Hollywood Starlet	Morgan Carter / Claudia Miller	Lifetime television film
2013	G.B.F.	Soledad Braunstein	

=== Television shows and appearances ===
Year	Title	Role	Notes
1998	Kids Say the Darndest Things	Herself / Contestant	Season 1
1999–2000	Destination Stardom	Herself / Contestant	November 6, 1999 (Season 1, Episode 12); January 1, 2000 (Season 1, Episode 18)
2002	The Bernie Mac Show	Michelle Cooper	"Bernie Mac Dance Party" (Season 2, Episode 6)
2003	America's Most Talented Kid	Herself / Contestant	1 episode
2004	American Dreams	Linda Ronstadt	"Tidings of Comfort and Joy" (Season 3, Episode 9)
2006	Romeo!	Herself	"Ro' Trip – Part 2" (Season 3, Episode 13)
2007	Punk'd	Herself	"8.6" (Season 8, Episode 6)
2010	House of Glam	Herself	"La La Land" (Season 1, Episode 4)
2011	Hawaii Five-0	Courtney Russell	"Kai e'e" (Season 1, Episode 15)
2011	The Dance Scene	Herself	
2017	Shane and Friends	Herself	Fullscreen Original Series
2017	Lethal Weapon	Shaye	"Born to Run" (Season 2, Episode 3)
2019	The X Factor: Celebrity	Herself	"Auditions – Part 2"
2021	The Masked Singer	Black Swan	Season 5 Runner-Up
2022	All American	Sabine	Recurring Role
2022	Hell's Kitchen	Herself	Red Team's Chef's Table guest diner; Episode: "Just Wingin' It"
2023	A Very Demi Holiday Special	Herself	Television special

== Tours ==
=== Headlining ===
- The High Road Tour (2007)
- Then & Now Concert Tour (2010)
- Pinktober (2011)
- The Agápē Tour (2013)
- I Am JoJo Tour (2015–2016)
- Mad Love Tour (2017)
- Leaks, Covers and Mixtapes Tour (2018)
- Trying Not to Think About It Tour (2021)
- JoJo Tour 2022 (2022)
- Too Much To Say Tour (2025)
- The High Road: 20 Years Unplugged (2026)

=== As a special guest ===
- Timbaland – Shock Value II Tour (2010)

=== As an opening act ===
- Usher – The Truth World Tour (2004)
- Joe Jonas/Jay Sean – Joe Jonas & Jay Sean Tour (2011)
- Big Time Rush – Better with U Tour (2012)
- Fifth Harmony – The 7/27 Tour (2016)

== Broadway ==
Year	Title	Role	Notes
2023	Moulin Rouge!	Satine	Broadway musical
2024	Moulin Rouge!	Satine	Broadway musical

== Books ==
Year	Title	Type
2024	Over the Influence	Memoir and photography

== Awards and nominations ==
Year	Presenter	Awards	Result
2004	MTV Video Music Award	Best New Artist – "Leave (Get Out)"	Nominated
2004	Billboard Music Awards	Female New Artist of the Year	Nominated
2004	Billboard Music Awards	Mainstream Top 40 Single of the Year – "Leave (Get Out)"	Nominated
2004	Radio Disney Music Awards	Best Female Artist – "Leave (Get Out)"	Nominated
2004	Radio Disney Music Awards	Best Video That Rocks – "Leave (Get Out)"	Won
2004	Bravo Otto Awards (Hungary)	Best Female Singer	Nominated
2005	Groovevolt Music and Fashion Awards	Best Deep Cut – "Never Say Goodbye"	Nominated
2005	Groovevolt Music and Fashion Awards	Best Song Performance (Female) – "Leave (Get Out)"	Nominated
2005	Radio Disney Music Awards	Best Female Artist	Nominated
2006	Teen Choice Award	Female Choice Breakout – Aquamarine	Nominated
2006	Radio Disney Music Awards	Best Artist Or Song Your Teacher Likes – "Too Little, Too Late"	Won
2006	Radio Disney Music Awards	Favorite Karaoke Song – "Too Little, Too Late"	Won
2006	Radio Disney Music Awards	Best True Ringer Ring Tone – "Too Little, Too Late"	Nominated
2006	Radio Disney Music Awards	Best Song to Wake Up To – "Too Little, Too Late"	Nominated
2006	Radio Disney Music Awards	Best Song You've Heard a Million Times and Still Love – "Too Little, Too Late"	Nominated
2007	Boston Music Awards	National Female of The Year – "Too Little, Too Late"	Won
2007	Hollywood Life 9th Annual Young Hollywood Awards	Breakthrough performance	Won
2007	Young Artist Awards	Best Performance in a Feature Film – Aquamarine	Nominated
2008	Yahoo Music Awards	for over 10,000,000 downloads – "Too Little, Too Late"	Won
2008	Boston Music Awards	Outstanding Pop/R&B Act of the Year	Nominated
2009	Poptastic Award	Best TV Movie – True Confessions of a Hollywood Starlet	Nominated
2016	Boston Music Awards	Pop Artist of the Year	Nominated
2019	Soul Train Music Awards	Best Collaboration Performance – "Say So" PJ Morton ft. JoJo	Nominated
2020	51st NAACP Image Awards	Outstanding Duo, Group or Collaboration – "Say So" PJ Morton ft. JoJo	Nominated
2021	47th People's Choice Awards	The Competition Contestant of 2021 – The Masked Singer	Nominated
