= List of songs recorded by JoJo =

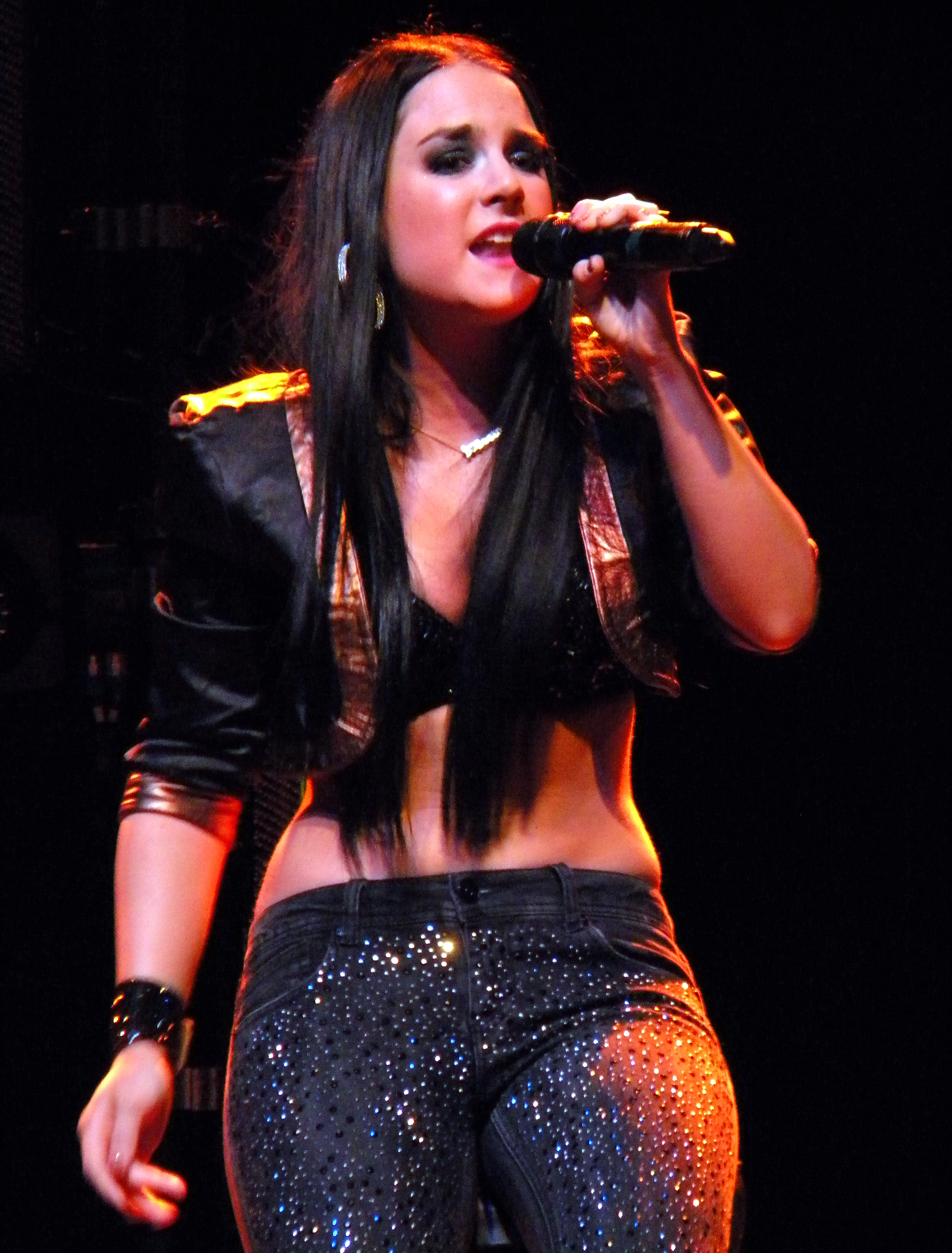
JoJo performing as the opening act on the Joe Jonas & Jay Sean Tour in Atlanta, Georgia, in October 2011

JoJo is an American Pop/R&B recording artist. She has written and recorded material for her four studio albums, JoJo (2004), The High Road (2006), Mad Love (2016), Good To Know (2020), a Christmas album, December Baby (2020), and two mixtape Can't Take That Away from Me (2010) and Agápē (2012). Songs included in this list are from her studio albums, mixtapes as well as collaborations with other recording artists on duets and featured songs on their respective albums, as well as her written material for other recording artists and the tracks from her upcoming capsule project Trying Not To Think About It which is to release October 1. JoJo has also lent her vocals to several charity songs and television advertisements.

== Career ==
JoJo made her chart debut on July 24, 2004 with the worldwide hit, "Leave (Get Out)", after signing a deal with record labels Blackground Records and Da Family Entertainment at age 12 in 2003. She began working with some producers on her platinum-selling debut album, JoJo, which is primarily a pop and R&B album. The album's second singles, "Baby It's You" features American rapper Bow Wow on the single release version, however, The album version of the song is performed by JoJo herself. Although it failed to match the success of her debut single, the song was successful in many countries. "Not that Kinda Girl" was released as the album's third and final single. The single received a limited release, only receiving minimal airplay in the US. Due to lack of a physical CD in many countries, the single was a commercial failure compared to her other two singles. Following the 2004 Indian Ocean earthquake and Hurricane Katrina in 2005 JoJo was featured on the charity record, "Come Together Now", alongside "Celine Dion", "The Game" and "Jesse McCartney" among others. JoJo was also featured on the 2004 soundtrack for Shark Tale on a song called "Secret Love".

In 2006, JoJo released her gold-certified sophomore album, entitled The High Road, which contained more urban-pop/R&B and Hip Hop influenced songs. The album spawned three singles, including the worldwide hit song "Too Little Too Late" which broke the record for the biggest jump into the top three on the Billboard Hot 100 chart, moving from number sixty-six to number three in one week; this record was previously held by Mariah Carey with her 2001 single "Loverboy", which went from number sixty to number two. as well as "How to Touch a Girl" and "Anything". In 2009, JoJo collaborated with Timbaland and appeared on his second studio album Shock Value II on the songs Lose Control & Timothy Where Have You Been which also featured Jet. JoJo was also featured on the soundtrack for the 2009 film More than a Game on a song called If You Dream with Tank alongside Jordin Sparks, Tyrese Gibson and Toni Braxton, among others.

JoJo released her debut mixtape, Can't Take That Away From Me on September 7, 2010 for free digital download through Rap-Up.com. The mixtape drew upon more pop, hip-hop and soulful genres compared to her previous albums with the mixtapes first single being a track titled (I Only Know Him) In the Dark. JoJo released her second free mixtape entitled Agápē on her 22nd birthday on December 20, 2012, and marking the follow-up to her 2010 mixtape. The mixtape has spawned three singles so far with the first being "We Get By" which was released for free online on November 15, 2012 on JoJo's official SoundCloud with a limited number of downloads, with JoJo stating "there's a limit on the download because we want you to download the entire mixtape once its released". The second single "Andre" was released on November 30, 2012. The song was inspired by the OutKast rapper's 2003 album The Love Below. The songs accompanying music video was directed by Patrick "Embryo" Tapu and made its official premiere on official worldwide premiere on March 21, 2013 exclusively through Complex Magazine. The mixtapes third and current single "Thinking Out Loud" is currently scheduled to premiere in June 2013 which will include the full extended version of the song, along with the accompanying music video which was shot on March 29, 2013 in Downtown Los Angeles with director Aaron A. "Can't Handle The Truth" is set to be released as the fourth single.

In 2015 JoJo released an extended play titled III. Its lead single was “When Love Hurts”. The other two tracks are “Save My Soul” and “Say Love”.

JoJo released her third studio album, Mad Love, October 14, 2016. It debuted #6 on the Billboard hot 200. It spawned 3 singles “F*** Apologies” which features Wiz Khalifa, “FAB” which features female rapper Remy Ma, and “I Can Only” which features Canadian singer-songwriter Alessia Cara.

On May 1, 2020, JoJo released her fourth studio album Good to Know. It debuted at #33 on the Billboard 200 and spawned 2 singles. "Man" being the first single released March 13. She then later released "Lonely Hearts" as the second single with a remix featuring singer Demi Lovato on the deluxe version of the album

== Released songs ==
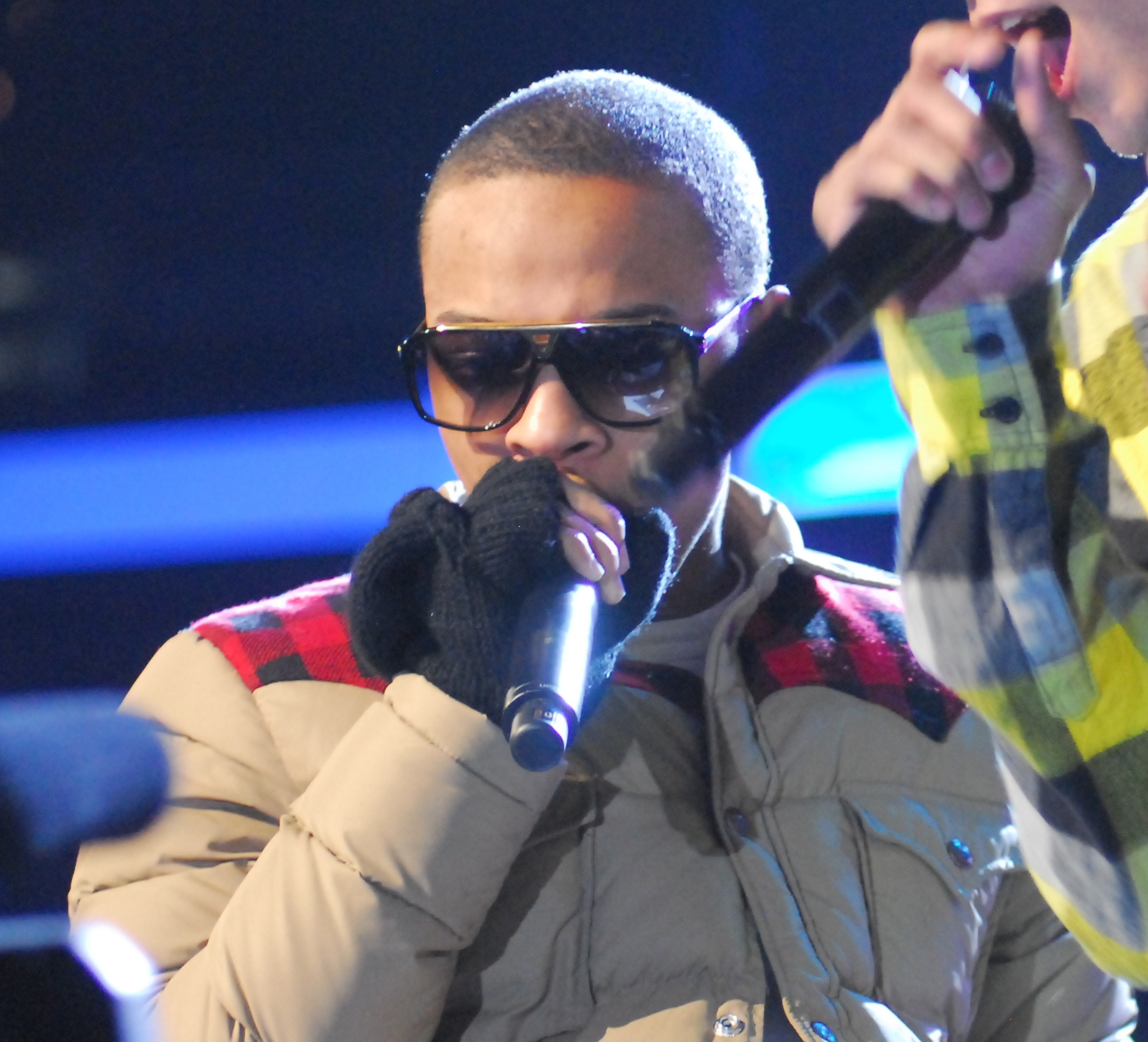
Bow Wow appears as a featured vocalist on the remix version of "Baby It's You" which can only be found on the single release.

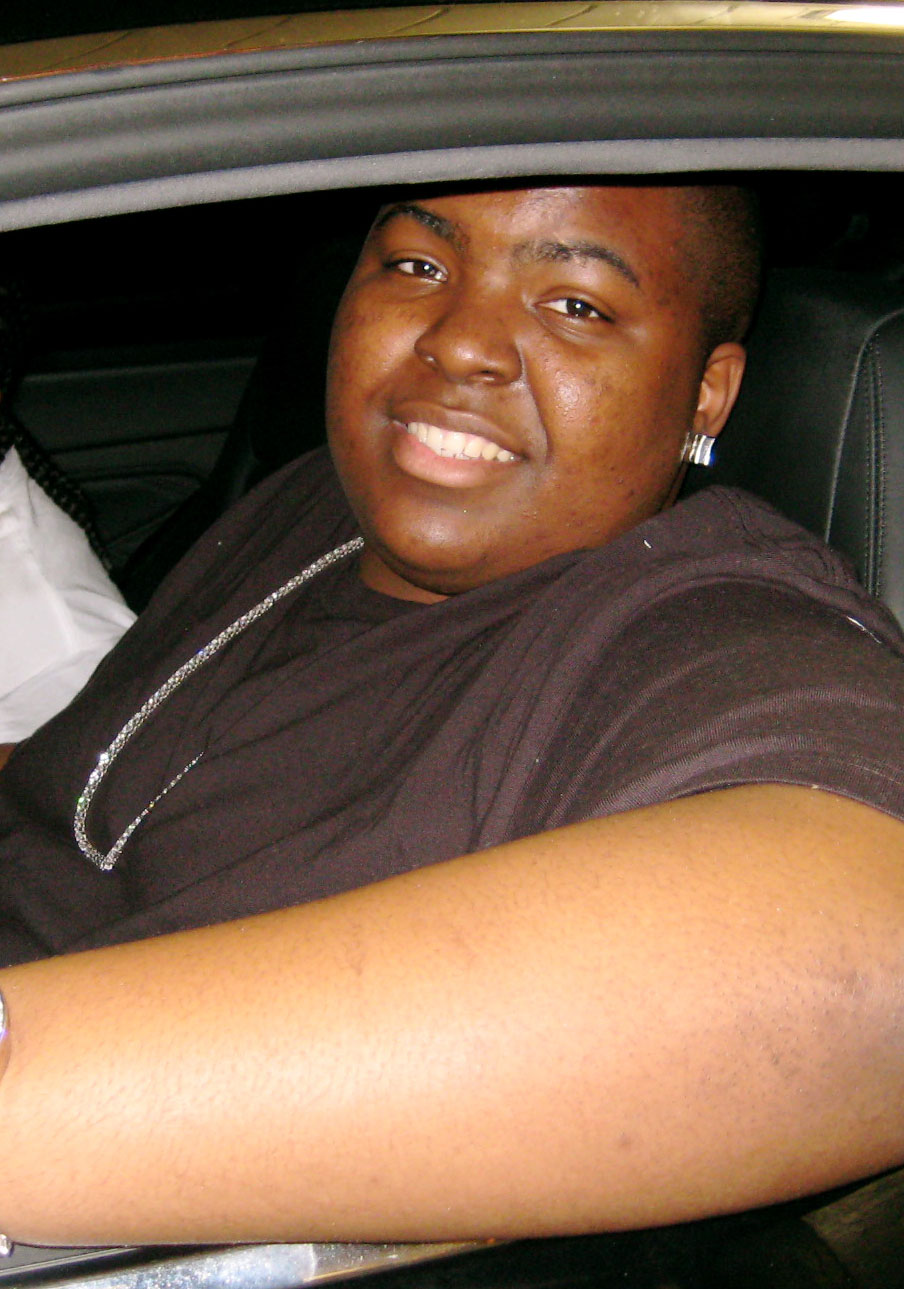
JoJo released a cover response version of Sean Kingston's song "Beautiful Girls" titled "Beautiful Girls Reply" Kingston's version is about a boy who is suicidal over the failure of his relationship with a "beautiful girl", JoJo speaks from a girl's perspective.

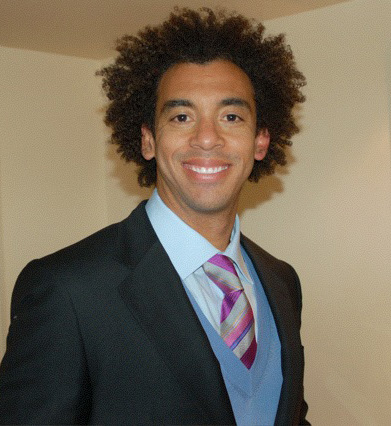
Harvey Mason, Jr. co-wrote several songs for JoJo including "Baby It's You" & "Never Say Goodbye".

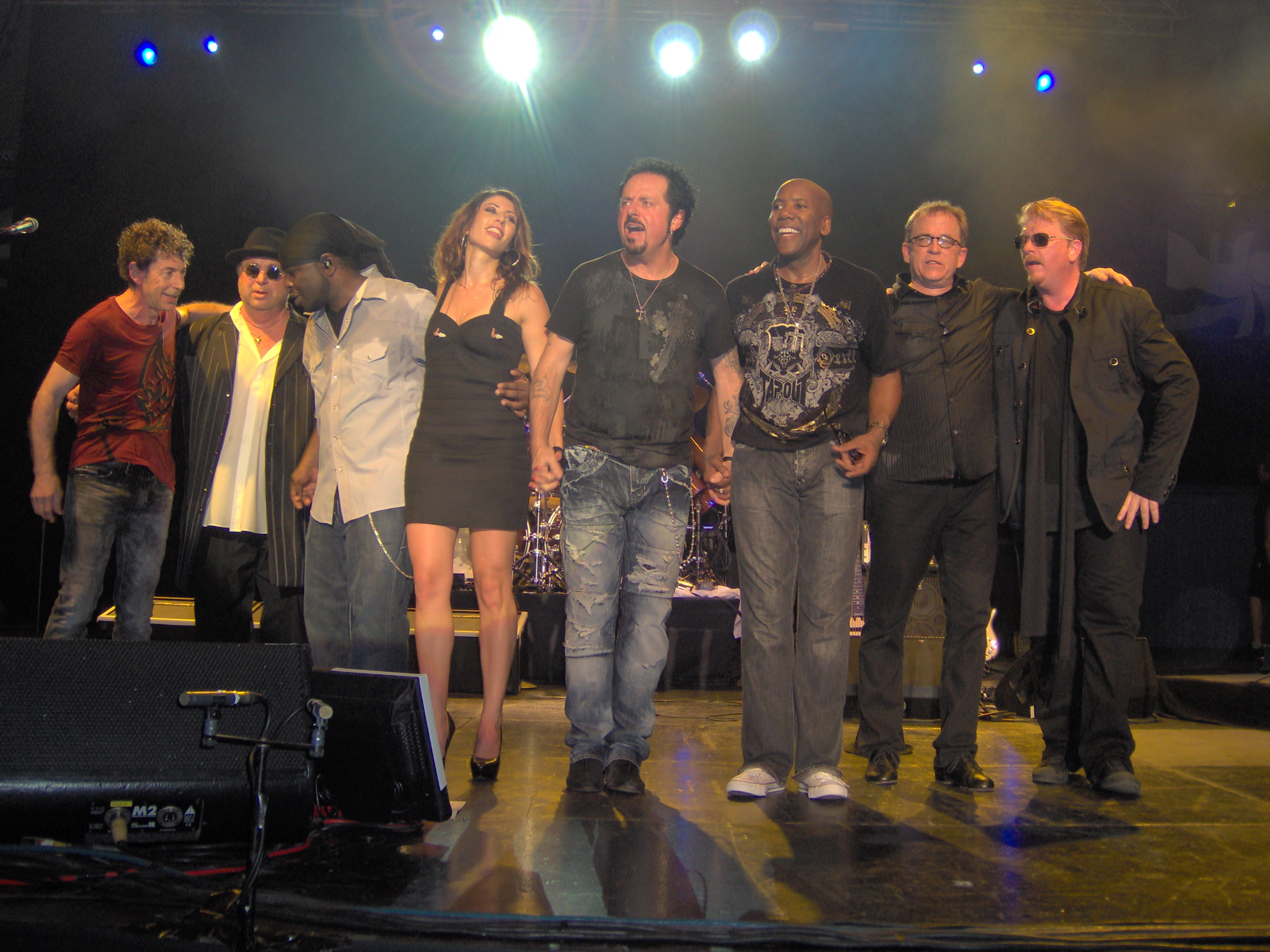
"Anything" contains a sample of Toto's 1982 song "Africa written by lead singer Jeff Porcaro & David Paich. Due to the heavy interpolation of the song, Parcaro & Paich received co-writing credits.

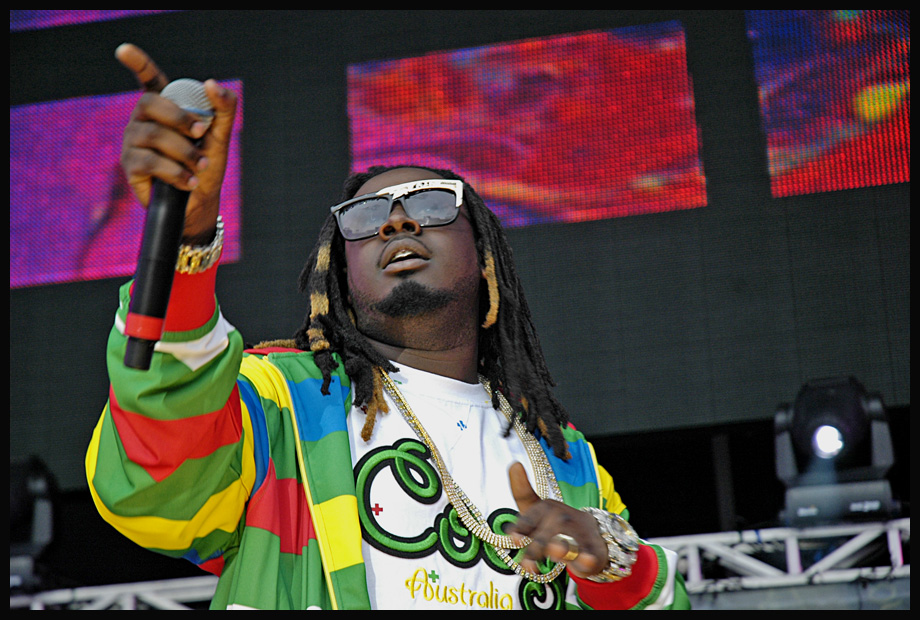
JoJo released a cover version of T-Pain's song "Can't Believe It" where she re-wrote the song verses but kept the chorus.

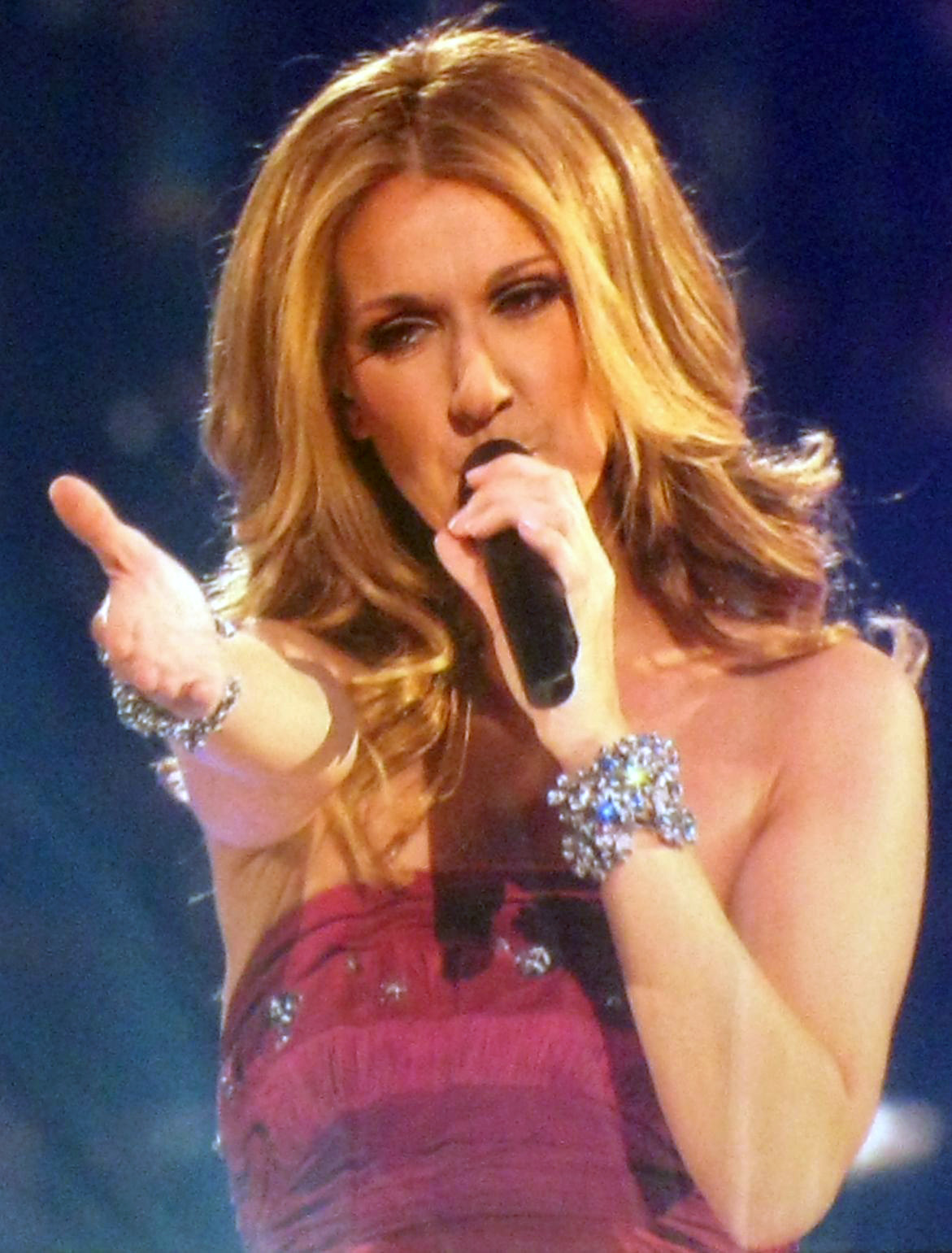
Celine Dion was featured as a guest vocalist on the charity single "Come Together Now" alongside JoJo.

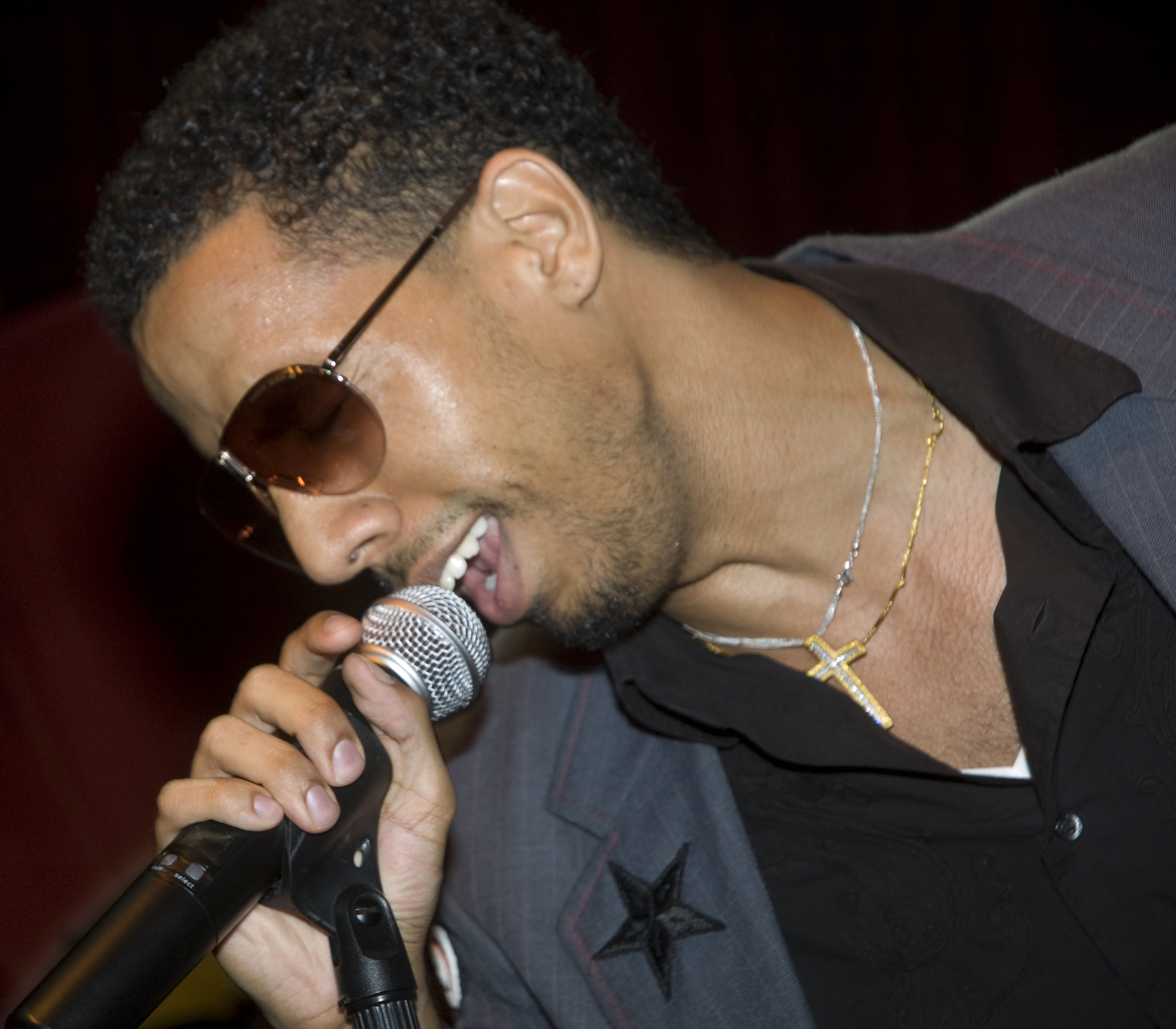
American R&B record producer, Ryan Leslie co-wrote the R&B influenced mid-tempo song "Like That".

Key
| † | Indicates single release |
| ‡ | Indicates promotional single release |

| Song | Artist(s) | Writer(s) | Album(s) | Year |
|---|---|---|---|---|
| "All I Want Is Everything" | JoJo | Joanna "JoJo" Levesque | Can't Take That Away from Me | 2010 |
| "American Mood" ‡ | JoJo | Joanna "JoJo" Levesque; Dernst Emile II; Nikki Flores; Tommy Parker | Non-album single | 2021 |
| "Andre" ‡ | JoJo | Joanna "JoJo" Levesque | Agápē | 2012 |
| "Anxiety (Burlinda's Theme)" | JoJo | Joanna "JoJo" Levesque; Kennedi Lykken; Robert McCurdy; Christopher Petrosino | Trying Not To Think About It | 2021 |
| "Anything" † | JoJo | Beau Dozier; Mischke Butler; Justin Trugman; David Paich; Jeff Porcaro | The High Road | 2006 |
| "Baby It's You" † | JoJo | Harvey Mason, Jr. Damon Thomas; Eric Dawkins; Antonio Dixon | JoJo | 2004 |
| "Back2Life" (Soul II Soul cover) | JoJo | Jazzie B Caron Wheeler; Nellee Hooper; Simon Law | LoveJo2 | 2015 |
| "Back2thebeginingagain" | JoJo | Joanna "JoJo" Levesque; Jahi Sundance | Agápē | 2012 |
| "Back and Forth" | JoJo | Vincent Herbert; Tremain Saunders; Brian Reeves | JoJo | 2004 |
| "Bad Habits (Intro)" | JoJo | Joanna "JoJo" Levesque; Jordan Orvosh; Jason Gilbert; Sebastian Kole | Good to Know | 2020 |
| "B.I.D." | JoJo | Michael Holmes; Gracie Ella | Trying Not To Think About It | 2021 |
| "Billions" | JoJo | Joanna "JoJo" Levesque; Austin Brown; Scott Bruzenak; Kelly Parker; Pavel Gitnik | Agápē | 2012 |
| "Boy Without a Heart" ‡ | JoJo | Joanna "JoJo" Levesque; Nasri Atweh | Can't Take That Away from Me | 2010 |
| "Breezy" | JoJo | Kwamé Holland; Balewa Muhammad; Sylvester Jordan; Jr. Thom Bell; Roland Chambers; Kenny Gamble | JoJo | 2004 |
| "Butterflies" | JoJo | Unknown | JoJo | 2004 |
| "Can't Handle the Truth" | JoJo | Joanna "JoJo" Levesque; Elijah Blake | Agápē | 2012 |
| "Can't Take That Away from Me" | JoJo | Joanna "JoJo" Levesque; Mischke | Can't Take That Away from Me | 2010 |
| "Caught Up in the Rapture" (Anita Baker cover) | JoJo | Gary Glenn; Dianne Quander | LoveJo | 2014 |
| "The Change" | JoJo | Diane Warren; Dave Rosser; Nicholas Eaholtz | Non-album single | 2020 |
| "Cheat" | Mahalia & JoJo | Joanna "JoJo" Levesque; Spencer Stewart; Uzoechi Emenike; Ryan Campbell; Chrystal Lecointe | IRL | 2023 |
| "The Christmas Song" | JoJo | Mel Tormé; Robert Wells | December Baby | 2020 |
| "City Lights" | JoJo | Reggie Burrell; Ronald Burrell; Vincent Herbert; Stephen Garrett | JoJo | 2004 |
| "Clovers" | JoJo | Joanna "JoJo" Levesque; Joshua Monroy; Gino Barletta | Mad Love | 2016 |
| "Comeback" | JoJo | Joanna "JoJo" Levesque; Lauren LaRue; Samuel Gloade; Adarius Morgane | Good to Know | 2020 |
| "Coming for You" | JoJo | Edwin "Lil' Eddie" Serrano; Francci; Lisa Simmons; Kenneth Karlin | The High Road | 2006 |
| "Coming Home" | JoJo | Joanna "JoJo" Levesque; Bryan Wiggins; Nethaniel Austin Brown | December Baby | 2020 |
| "Creature of Habit" † | JoJo | Emmanuel Nickerson; Alexandra Artourovna Yatchenko; Justin Tranter; Morten Jensen | Non-album single | 2021 |
| "Damage is Done" † | Y2K & JoJo | Joanna "JoJo" Levesque; Henry Allen; Sasha Sloan; Ari Starace | Non-album single | 2020 |
| "December Baby" | JoJo | Joanna "JoJo" Levesque; Bryan Wiggins; Nethaniel Austin Brown | December Baby | 2020 |
| "Deck the Halls (Interlude)" | JoJo | Thomas Oliphant | December Baby | 2020 |
| "Demonstrate" † | JoJo | Daniel Daley; Anthony Jeffries; Joanna "JoJo" Levesque; Noah Shebib | Non-album single | 2012 |
| "Dirty Laundry" † | Parson James featuring JoJo | Kenneth Wright; Doc Brittain | Non-album single | 2021 |
| "Disaster" † | JoJo | Joanna "JoJo" Levesque; Gino Barletta; Mario Marchetti; Marc Himmel | Non-album single | 2011 |
| "Dissolve" | JoJo | Joanna "JoJo" Levesque; Thomas Lumpkins; Isabella Sjöstrand; Dernst Emile II | Trying Not To Think About It | 2021 |
| "Don't Talk Me Down" | JoJo | Joanna "JoJo" Levesque; Natalie Dunn; Peder Losnegard | Good to Know | 2020 |
| "Don't Wake Me Up" | The Newton Brothers, Callaghan Belle, & JoJo | Callaghan Belle; The Newton Brothers; Taylor Stewart | From The Motion Picture Soundtrack Extinction | 2018 |
| "Do Whatcha Gotta Do" | JoJo | Bernard Edwards; Joanna "JoJo" Levesque | The High Road | 2006 |
| "Edibles" | JoJo | Joanna "JoJo" Levesque; Jussi Karvinen; Justin Tranter; Hayley Warner | Mad Love | 2016 |
| "Exceptional" | JoJo | Diane Warren | The High Road | 2006 |
| "FAB" | JoJo featuring Remy Ma | Joanna "JoJo" Levesque; Jussi Karvinen; Hayley Warner; Jason Dean; Joe Kirkland; Reminisce Smith | Mad Love | 2016 |
| "Fairy Tales" | JoJo | Tremain Saunders; Nastacia Kendall; Vincent Herbert | JoJo | 2004 |
| "Feel Alright" | JoJo | Joanna "JoJo" Levesque; Sean Elijah Blake Fenton; Bianca Atterberry; Rob Grimaldi | Trying Not To Think About It | 2021 |
| "Fresh New Sheets" | JoJo | Joanna "JoJo" Levesque; Nikki Flores | Trying Not To Think About It | 2021 |
| "Fuck Apologies" † | JoJo featuring Wiz Khalifa | Joanna "JoJo" Levesque; Oscar Holter; Matt Friedman; Taylor Parks; Jason Dean; Joe Kirkland; Cameron Thomaz | Mad Love | 2016 |
| "Get It Poppin'" | JoJo | Joanna "JoJo" Levesque; Emile Ghantous; Erik Nelson | The High Road (Walmart Edition) | 2006 |
| "Glory" | JoJo | Traditional | LoveJo | 2014 |
| "Gold" | JoJo | Joanna "JoJo" Levesque; Kennedi Lykken; Joelle James; Robert McCurdy; Christopher Petrosino; Asheton | Good to Know | 2020 |
| "Good Enough (Interlude)" | JoJo | Joanna "JoJo" Levesque; Nikki Flores | Trying Not To Think About It | 2021 |
| "Good Ol'" | JoJo | Edwin "Lil' Eddie" Serrano; Francci; Lisa Simmons | The High Road | 2006 |
| "Good Thing" | JoJo | Joanna "JoJo" Levesque; Amish Dilipkumar Patel; Uzoechi Osisioma Emenike | Mad Love | 2016 |
| "The Happy Song" | JoJo | Mike City | JoJo | 2004 |
| "Have Yourself A Merry Little Christmas" | JoJo | Jordan Orvosh; Hugh Martin; Ralph Blane | December Baby | 2020 |
| "High Heels" | JoJo | Joanna "JoJo" Levesque; TJ Routon; Jason Dean; Joe Kirkland; Zak Waters | Mad Love | 2016 |
| "The High Road" | JoJo | Bridget Benenate; J.R. Rotem; Matthew Gerrard | The High Road | 2006 |
| "Homeboy" | JoJo | Roosevelt Harrell III; Balewa Muhammad; Sylvester Jordan, Vincent Herbert; Ritchie Adams; Mark Barkan | JoJo | 2004 |
| "Honest" | JoJo | Joanna "JoJo" Levesque; Jakob Hazell; Svante Halldin; Hayley Warner; Jason Dean; Joe Kirkland | Mad Love | 2016 |
| "How to Touch a Girl" † | JoJo | Billy Steinberg; Josh Alexander; Joanna "JoJo" Levesque | The High Road | 2006 |
| "Hung Up On You" | Stevie Mackey featuring JoJo | Joanna "JoJo" Levesque; Lauren Frawley; Jeremy Dussolliet; Steve Mackey; James Morales; Matthew Morales; Lawrence Principato; Timothy Sommers | The Most Wonderful Time | 2020 |
| "I Am" | JoJo | Joanna "JoJo" Levesque; Alex Dezen; Eric Rosse; Jaden Michaels | Mad Love | 2016 |
| "I Can Only" | JoJo featuring Alessia Cara | Joanna "JoJo" Levesque; Jussi Karvinen; Justin Tranter; Hayley Warner; Alessia Caracciolo | Mad Love | 2016 |
| "I Can Take You There" | JoJo | Beau Dozier | The High Road | 2006 |
| "(I Only Know Him) In the Dark" ‡ | JoJo | Joanna "JoJo" Levesque | Can't Take That Away from Me | 2010 |
| "In Your Room" | JoJo | Joanna "JoJo" Levesque; Merna Bishouty; Elizabeth Lowell Boland; Adam Fujiki; Martin McKinney; Michael Sonier; Dylan Wiggins; Daniel Wilson | Good to Know | 2020 |
| "Joanna" ‡ | JoJo | Joanna "JoJo" Levesque; Jeff Gitelman; Nat Dunn; Rebekah Muhammad | Non-album single | 2019 |
| "Just A Dream" | JoJo | Joanna "JoJo" Levesque; Jordan Gatsby | Can't Take That Away From Me | 2010 |
| "Keep on Keepin' On" | JoJo | Joanna "JoJo" Levesque | JoJo | 2004 |
| "Kiss" | JoJo | Joanna "JoJo" Levesque; Kennedi Lykken; Robert McCurdy; Christopher Petrosino | Good to Know | 2020 |
| "Leave (Get Out)" † | JoJo | Soulshock; Kenneth Karlin; Alex Cantrell; Phillip "Silky" White | JoJo | 2004 |
| "Lift" | JoJo | Joanna "JoJo" Levesque; James Droll; Caroline Baker | Trying Not To Think About It | 2021 |
| "Like That" | JoJo | Corey Latif Williams; Ryan Leslie | The High Road | 2006 |
| "Like This" | JoJo | Joanna "JoJo" Levesque; Joshua Monroy; Sidnie Tipton | Mad Love | 2016 |
| "Lonely Hearts" † | JoJo | Joanna "JoJo" Levesque; Elizabeth Lowell Boland; Merna Bishouty; Martin McKinney; Dylan Wiggins | Good to Know | 2020 |
| "Lonely Hearts" (Remix) | JoJo featuring Demi Lovato | Joanna "JoJo" Levesque; Elizabeth Lowell Boland; Merna Bishouty; Martin McKinney; Dylan Wiggins | Good to Know | 2020 |
| "Love Reggae" | JoJo featuring Tinashe | Joanna "JoJo" Levesque; Tinashe; Brittany Coney; Denisia "Blu June" Andrews; Faris Al-Majed; Nevin Sastry; Richard Munos; The ANMLS | Good to Know | 2020 |
| "Mad Love" | JoJo | Joanna "JoJo" Levesque; Joshua Monroy; Nikki Flores | Mad Love | 2016 |
| "Man" † | JoJo | Joanna "JoJo" Levesque; Lauren LaRue; Rodrick Doss Jr. Evon Barnes; Sofia Quinn; Chelsea Lena; Cameron Lazar | Good to Know | 2020 |
| "Music" | JoJo | Joanna "JoJo" Levesque; Jussi Karvinen; Justin Tranter; Hayley Warner | Mad Love | 2016 |
| "My Time Is Money" | JoJo | Joanna "JoJo" Levesque; Nasri Atweh; Luke James | Can't Take That Away from Me | 2010 |
| "Never Say Goodbye" | JoJo | Harvey Mason, Jr; Damon Thomas; Eric Dawkins; Antonio Dixon | JoJo | 2004 |
| "Nikki's Sound Bath (Interlude)" | JoJo | Joanna "JoJo" Levesque; Nikki Flores | Trying Not To Think About It | 2021 |
| "Noelle" | JoJo featuring Jacob Collier | William Sandys | December Baby | 2020 |
| "Not That Kinda Girl" † | JoJo | Neely Dinkins; B. Cola Pietro; Muhammad, Jordan | JoJo | 2004 |
| "Note to God" | JoJo | Diane Warren | The High Road | 2006 |
| "North Pole" | JoJo | Joanna "JoJo" Levesque; Bryan Wiggins; Nethaniel Austin Brown | December Baby | 2020 |
| "O Come, All Ye Faithful (Interlude)" | JoJo | John Francis Wade; Jean-François-Étienne Borderies | December Baby | 2020 |
| "Pedialyte" | JoJo | Joanna "JoJo" Levesque; James Norton; Peder Losnegard; Enrico Pieranunzi; Silvano Chimenti; Tobias Brewer | Good to Know | 2020 |
| "Porcelain" | JoJo | Eddie Serrano; Joanna "JoJo" Levesque; David J. Parks; David Williams II; Harry Wayne Casey; Luke Campbell; Rick Finch; Theron Feemster | TBA | 2024 |
| "Pretty Please" | JoJo | Jim Beanz; Joanna "JoJo" Levesque; Kenna | Can't Take That Away from Me | 2010 |
| "Proud (Outro)" | JoJo | Joanna "JoJo" Levesque; Kennedi Lykken; Jamie Hartman; Peder Losnegard; Brandon Wollman | Good to Know | 2020 |
| "Reckless" | JoJo | Joanna "JoJo" Levesque; Michael Kintish; Ryan Gray Hawken | Mad Love | 2016 |
| "Recognize" | Skizzy Mars featuring JoJo | Myles Mars; Ethan Lowery; Paulo Atienza Rodriguez; Mark Nilan Jr. Michael Keenan | Alone Together | 2016 |
| "Right on Time" | JoJo | Joanna "JoJo" Levesque; Gino Barletta; Donna Lewis | LoveJo2 | 2015 |
| "Rise Up" | JoJo | Joanna "JoJo" Levesque; Jakob Hazell; Svante Halldin; Hayley Warner; Jason Dean; Joe Kirkland | Mad Love | 2016 |
| "Running on Empty" | JoJo | Joanna "JoJo" Levesque; Mischke | Can't Take That Away from Me | 2010 |
| "Sabotage" † | JoJo featuring CHIKA | Joanna "JoJo" Levesque; CHIKA; Martin McKinney; Dylan Wiggins; Michael Sonier; Merna Bishouty; Dan Wilson | Non-album single | 2019 |
| "Save My Soul" ‡ | JoJo | Nikki Flores; Anton Malmberg Hård af Segerstad; Joy Deb; Linnea Deb | III | 2015 |
| "Say Love" ‡ | JoJo | Harmony Samuels; Wayne Hector; Chloe Angelides | III | 2015 |
| "Say So" † | PJ Morton & JoJo | PJ Morton | Paul | 2019 |
| "Secret Love" | JoJo | Samantha Jade; Jared Gosselin; Phillip White | Shark Tale: Motion Picture Soundtrack | 2004 |
| "Sexy To Me" ‡ | JoJo | Joanna "JoJo" Levesque; Danja; Jim Beanz; Kenna; Marcella Araica | Non-album single | 2012 |
| "Silent Night" | JoJo | Franz Xaver Gruber; Joseph Mohr | December Baby | 2020 |
| "Small Things" | JoJo | Joanna "JoJo" Levesque; Brandon Skeie; Caroline Ailin; Robert McCurdy; Christopher Petrosino; Hogan; Ishmael Windley | Good to Know | 2020 |
| "So Bad" | JoJo | Joanna "JoJo" Levesque; Merna Bishouty; Chantal Kreviazuk; Martin McKinney; Dylan Wiggins | Good to Know | 2020 |
| "Somebody Else" ‡ | Tank featuring JoJo | Durrell Artaze Babbs; Joanna "JoJo" Levesque | Elevation | 2019 |
| "Spiral SZN" | JoJo | Joanna "JoJo" Levesque; Nate Cyphert; Riley Blederer; Rob Grimaldi | Trying Not To Think About It | 2021 |
| "Sugar & Carbs (Interlude)" | JoJo | Joanna "JoJo" Levesque | Trying Not To Think About It | 2021 |
| "Sunshine" | JoJo | Vincent Herbert; Joanna "JoJo" Levesque; Tremain Saunders | JoJo | 2004 |
| "Take Me Home" (Phil Collins cover) | JoJo | Phil Collins | LoveJo | 2014 |
| "Take the Canyon" | JoJo | Joanna "JoJo" Levesque; Austin Brown; Scott Bruzenak | Agápē | 2012 |
| "Think About You" | JoJo | Joanna "JoJo" Levesque; Andrew Jackson; Peder Losnegard | Good to Know | 2020 |
| "Thinking Out Loud" | JoJo | Joanna "JoJo" Levesque; Austin Brown; Scott Bruzenak | Agápē and LoveJo2 | 2012 / 2015 |
| "This Time" | JoJo | Sean Garrett; Scott Storch | The High Road | 2006 |
| "Too Little Too Late" † | JoJo | Billy Steinberg; Josh Alexander; Ruth-Anne Cunningham | The High Road | 2006 |
| "Too Little Too Late" Spanish Version † | JoJo | Billy Steinberg; Josh Alexander; Ruth-Anne Cunningham | The High Road | 2006 |
| "Use My Shoulder" | JoJo | David Conley; Bernard Jackson; David Townsend; Reggie Burrell; Ronald Burrell; Stephen Garrett | JoJo | 2004 |
| "Vibe" | JoJo | Joanna "JoJo" Levesque; Antonina Armato; Tim James | Mad Love | 2016 |
| "The Way You Do Me" | JoJo | Sean Garrett; Swizz Beatz | The High Road | 2006 |
| "Weak" | JoJo | Brian Alexander Morgan | JoJo | 2004 |
| "We Wish You A Merry Christmas (Interlude)" | JoJo | Arthur Warrell | December Baby | 2020 |
| "We Get By" ‡ | JoJo | Joanna "JoJo" Levesque; Scott Bruzenak | Agápē | 2012 |
| "What Child Is This? (Interlude)" | JoJo | William Dix | December Baby | 2020 |
| "What You Like" | JoJo featuring Jordan Gatsby | Joanna "JoJo" Levesque; Jordan Gatsby | Can't Take That Away from Me | 2010 |
| "What U Need" † | JoJo | Joanna "JoJo" Levesque; Brittany Coney; Denisia Andrews; Matias Saabye Peschcke-Køed | Good to Know | 2020 |
| "When Does It Go Away" | JoJo featuring Travis Garland | Travis Garland; Beau Dozier | Can't Take That Away from Me | 2010 |
| "When Love Hurts" † | JoJo | Benjamin Levin; Jason Evigan; Ryn Weaver; Ammar Malik; Daniel Omelio | III | 2015 |
| "When Love Hurts" (Real Love Remix) | JoJo | Benjamin Levin; Jason Evigan; Ryn Weaver; Ammar Malik; Daniel Omelio | LoveJo2 | 2015 |
| "White Girl In Paris" | JoJo | Joni Mitchell | Agápē | 2012 |
| "Why Didn't You Call" | JoJo | Joanna "JoJo" Levesque, | Can't Take That Away from Me | 2010 |
| "Wishlist" | JoJo featuring PJ Morton | Joanna "JoJo" Levesque; PJ Morton; Bryan Wiggins; Nethaniel Austin Brown; Billy Steinberg | December Baby | 2020 |
| "Wonder Woman" | JoJo | Joanna "JoJo" Levesque; Josh Monroy; Nikki Flores | Non-album single | 2017 |
| "World of Sunshine (Intro)" | JoJo | Joanna "JoJo" Levesque; Jordan Orvosh | Trying Not To Think About It | 2021 |
| "Worst (I Assume)" † | JoJo | Joanna "JoJo" Levesque; Tiara Thomas; Carl McCormick; Kelvin Wooten | Trying Not To Think About It | 2021 |
| "Wrap Me Up" | JoJo | Joanna "JoJo" Levesque; Bryan Wiggins; Nethaniel Austin Brown | December Baby | 2020 |
| "X (1 Thing Wrong)" | JoJo | Joanna "JoJo" Levesque; Ben Shapiro; Daniel Hackett; Diana Gordon; Felicia Ferraro; Nima Jahanbin; Paimon Jahanbin | Good to Know | 2020 |
| "Yes or No" | JoJo | Tremain Saunders; Joanna "JoJo" Levesque; Vincent Herbert; Reggie Burrell; Ronald Burrell | JoJo | 2004 |

== Unreleased songs ==
During the recording process for JoJo's third studio album, with working titles like Jumping Trains and All I Want Is Everything, as well as sophomore efforts, dozens of tracks had leaked onto the internet, including short snippets and full-length songs. As of 2026, over 300 tracks have leaked, with several albums worth of material, as well as numerous titles being registered on sites such as ASCAP and BMI. One of the leaked tracks, "Can't Take That Away from Me" was included on JoJo's debut mixtape of the same name, while fragments of another song titled "Let It All Go" from the Mad Love sessions were used as an interlude on JoJo's 2025 EP NGL.

List of unreleased songs by JoJo
| Title | Other performer(s) | Writer(s) | Intended album | Year recorded | Leak | Ref |
|---|---|---|---|---|---|---|
| 100 Proof | JoJo | Joanna Levesque | Good to Know | 2019 | Yes | |
| 25 To Life | JoJo | Marsha Ambrosius; Sterling Simms; Theodore Thomas | All I Want Is Everything | 2009 | Yes | |
| 72460 | JoJo | Joanna Levesque; Jonathan Yip; Kim Petras; Ray Romulus; Jeremy Reeves; Ray McCullough; Johan Wetterberg | Mad Love | 2014 | Yes | |
| A Little Bit Of Something | JoJo | Joanna Levesque; Emile Ghantous; Erik Nelson | The High Road | 2006 | No | |
| Alone Together | JoJo | Joanna Levesque; Gino Barletta; Scott Bruzenak | Mad Love | 2014 | No | |
| Already All Ready | La'Porsha Renae | Joanna Levesque; Harmony Samuels; James Brown; Matt Morris | Mad Love | 2016 | Yes | |
| Around The World | JoJo | Joanna Levesque; Luke Boyd; Thai Jones; Roy Hamilton; Durrell Babbs | All I Want Is Everything | 2008 | Yes | |
| Back Words | JoJo | Priese Board; Carter Schultz | All I Want Is Everything | 2008 | Yes | |
| Bad Boys | JoJo | Joanna Levesque; Anthony Sears | JoJo | 2003 | No | |
| Bad Vibrations | JoJo | Joanna Levesque; Leroy Clampitt; Amy Kuney | Mad Love | 2016 | Yes | |
| Balance | JoJo | Joanna Levesque; Nasri Atweh; Adam Messenger | Jumping Trains | 2010 | No | |
| Beautiful Distraction | JoJo | Nasri Atweh; Adam Messinger | All I Want Is Everything | 2008 | Yes | |
| Beautiful Goodbye | f(x) | Nick Lachey; Alex Cantrall; Soulshock; Lindy Robbins; Karlin | The High Road | 2005 | No | |
| Before We Take It There | JoJo | Bryan Michael-Cox; Kendrick Dean | All I Want Is Everything | 2008 | Yes | |
| Besos | Paula DeAnda | Eddie "Lil Eddie" Serrano; Deanna Christine Colon; Nathan Perez; Marty James | —N/a | 2011 | Yes | |
| Bite My Tongue | JoJo | Joanna Levesque; Gino Barletta; Skyler Stonestreet; Nick Monson | Mad Love | 2016 | No | |
| Blame Me | JoJo | Joanna Levesque; Take A Daytrip | Good to Know | 2020 | Yes | |
| Bodyguard | JoJo | Joanna Levesque; Eric Bellinger; Ernest Clark; Aaron Michael Cox; Marcos Enrique Palacios | Jumping Trains | 2012 | Yes (Snippet) | |
| Boy Problem | JoJo | Joanna Levesque; Jordan Orvosh | Good to Know | 2018 | No | |
| Bravest Girl | JoJo | Joanna Levesque | Mad Love | 2014 | Yes | |
| Bread and Wine | JoJo | Fred Ball; Iain Farquharson; Joanna Levesque | Good to Know | 2017 | No | |
| Bread Winner | JoJo | Joanna Levesque; Lauren LaRue; John Forté; Jim Lavigne; David Brown; Zaire Simmons | Good to Know | 2017 | No | |
| Breaking Up With Me | JoJo | Unknown | Good to Know | 2017 | Yes | |
| Breakout | JoJo | Joanna Levesque; Luke James; Durrell Babbs; Olivia Jones; Christopher Breaux | All I Want Is Everything | 2008 | Yes | |
| Burning Man | JoJo | Joanna Levesque; Ruth-Anne Cunningham; Christopher J Baran | Mad Love | 2014 | Yes | |
| Caffeine | JoJo | Joanna Levesque; Jordan Orvosh | Good to Know | 2018 | No | |
| Care Less | JoJo | Joanna Levesque | Mad Love | 2014 | Yes | |
| Clarity And Closure | JoJo | Joanna Levesque | Good to Know | 2017 | Yes | |
| Cold Blooded | JoJo | Joanna Levesque; Edwin Serrano; Denarius Motes; Hasham Hussain | Jumping Trains | 2010 | Yes | |
| Combat Boots | JoJo | Gary Spriggs; Sean Marshall | Jumping Trains | 2011 | No | |
| Cradle | Stacie Orrico | Joanna Levesque; Stacie Orrico | The High Road | 2006 | No | |
| Curious | JoJo | Unknown | Good to Know | 2018 | Yes | |
| Deeper Love | JoJo | Joanna Levesque; Gino Barletta; Scott Bruzenak | Mad Love | 2014 | No | |
| Don't Call Here No More | JoJo | Shaffer Smith; Chuck Harmony | All I Want Is Everything | 2008 | Yes | |
| Don't Give Out My Love | JoJo | Joanna Levesque | Mad Love | 2016 | Yes | |
| Dopamine | JoJo | Joanna Levesque; Gino Barletta; Scott Bruzenak | Mad Love | 2014 | No | |
| Drinking Alone | JoJo | Joanna Levesque | Good to Know | 2017 | Yes (Snippet) | |
| Elements | JoJo | Joanna Levesque | Mad Love | 2014 | Yes | |
| Elevated | JoJo | Joanna Levesque | Good to Know | 2020 | Yes | |
| Doin’ It | JoJo | Joanna Levesque; Jonathan Yip; Kim Petras; Ray Romulus; Jeremy Reeves; Ray McCullough; Johan Wetterberg | Mad Love | 2014 | Yes | |
| Elsewhere | JoJo | Eddie Serrano; Joanna Levesque; Ernest Clark; Aaron Michael Cox; Marcos Enrique Palacios | Jumping Trains | 2010 | Yes (Snippet) | |
| Ex Over | JoJo | Joanna Levesque; Elizabeth Lowell Boland; Merna Bishouty; Dylan Wiggins; Martin McKinney; Adam Fujiki | Good to Know | 2019 | Yes | |
| Experience | JoJo | Josh Monroy; Sid Tipton; Joanna Levesque | Mad Love | 2015 | Yes | |
| Façade | JoJo | Joanna Levesque; Dana Parish; Andrew Hollander; Phil Bentley | Mad Love | 2014 | Yes | |
| Far From Heaven | JoJo | Joanna Levesque; Jennifer Decilveo; Ellie Goulding; Greg Kurstin; Haley Reinhart | Mad Love | 2015 | Yes | |
| Fear & Loathing | JoJo | JoJo Levesque | Good to Know | 2019 | Yes | |
| Fearless | JoJo | Bill Mann; Toby Gad; Joanna Levesque | All I Want Is Everything | 2008 | Yes | |
| Finally | JoJo | Chris Loco; Iain Farquharson; Joanna Levesque | Good to Know | 2017 | Yes | |
| Forever in My Life | JoJo | Jimmy Lawrence; Joey Gian; Marc Swersky | All I Want Is Everything | 2008 | Yes | |
| Forgiveness | JoJo | Joanna Levesque | Good to Know | 2018 | Yes | |
| Free | JoJo | Joanna Levesque; Blush | Mad Love | 2016 | Yes | |
| Free Somebody | Luna | Linnea Mary Han Deb; Joy Neil Mitro Deb; Joanna Levesque; Anton Malmberg Hård af Segerstad | Mad Love | 2014 | Yes | |
| Frequency | JoJo | Joanna Levesque; Gino Barletta; Skyler Stonestreet; Nick Monson | Mad Love | 2016 | No | |
| Frozen | JoJo | Joanna Levesque; Thomas Baxter; Tinashe Sibanda | Good to Know | 2017 | No | |
| Fuck It | JoJo | Sarah Thiele; Johan Lindbrandt; Alex Kinsey; Carol Ades | Mad Love | 2014 | No | |
| Fucking Genius | JoJo | Linnea Mary Han Deb; Joy Neil Mitro Deb; Joanna Levesque; Anton Malmberg Hård af Segerstad | Mad Love | 2016 | Yes | |
| Future Self | JoJo | Joanna Levesque; Savana Santos; Maddy Simmen | Trying Not to Think About It | 2021 | Yes | |
| Get Off On This | JoJo | Joanna Levesque; Jonathan Yip; Kim Petras; Ray Romulus; Jeremy Reeves; Ray McCullough; Johan Wetterberg | Mad Love | 2014 | Yes | |
| Get To You | JoJo | Joanna Levesque; Chantal Kreviazuk; Merna Bishouty; Dylan Wiggins; Martin McKinney | Good to Know | 2019 | No | |
| Guardian Angel | Lil Eddie featuring Amerie | Eddie Serrano; Happy Perez; William Serrano | Jumping Trains | 2011 | Yes | |
| Hardest Part | JoJo | Joanna Levesque; Jonathan Yip; Kim Petras; Ray Romulus; Jeremy Reeves; Ray McCullough; Johan Wetterberg | Mad Love | 2014 | Yes | |
| Heartbreak Survivor | Jake Zyrus | Joanna Levesque; Rico Love; Wayne Wilkins | All I Want Is Everything | 2009 | No | |
| Heart Never Had A Hero | Toni Braxton | Harvey Mason, Jr. Kara DioGuardi; Kasia Livingston; James Fauntleroy II; Steve Russell | Jumping Trains | 2011 | Yes | |
| Heaven | JoJo | Joanna Levesque | Good to Know | 2018 | Yes | |
| Hell of a Song | JoJo | James Washington | Jumping Trains | 2011 | No | |
| He Loves Me | JoJo | Joanna Levesque; Rodney Jerkins; Crystal Nicole Johnson; Andre Lindal | Jumping Trains | 2011 | No | |
| Here With Me | JoJo | Unknown | Jumping Trains | 2016 | Yes (snippet) | |
| Hold On | JoJo | Joanna Levesque; Jordan Omley; Michael Mani | All I Want Is Everything | 2009 | Yes | |
| Hollywood | JoJo | Krys Ivory; Ryan Morrone; Garrick Smith; Kyle Coleman | Jumping Trains | 2011 | Yes | |
| Hollywood Casualties | JoJo | Joanna Levesque; Jordan Orvosh | Good to Know | 2018 | No | |
| Hooked On You | JoJo | Joanna Levesque; Emile Ghantous; Erik Nelson | The High Road | 2006 | Yes | |
| How To Love | JoJo | Joanna Levesque; Clarence Coffee; Josh Monroy | Mad Love | 2016 | Yes | |
| How To Trust a Man | JoJo | Josh Monroy; Sid Tipton; Joanna Levesque | Mad Love | 2015 | Yes | |
| How To Lose A Man | JoJo | Eddie "Lil Eddie" Serrano; Denarius Motes; Hasham Hussain | Jumping Trains | 2011 | Yes | |
| How You Did It | JoJo | Rodney Jerkins | All I Want Is Everything | 2008 | Yes | |
| How You Want Me To Be | JoJo | Joanna Levesque; Chloe Angelides; Dillon Pace | Mad Love | 2016 | Yes | |
| Hurt Me So Good | Jazmine Sullivan | Akeel Henry; Jazmine Sullivan; Elliott Trent; Luca Mauti; Michael Holmes | Trying Not To Think About It | 2021 | Yes | |
| Idea of Us | JoJo | Gino Barletta; David Harris; Scott Bruzenak; Matthew Newbill | Mad Love | 2016 | Yes | |
| I Don't Wanna Cry (featuring Josh Milan) | JoJo | Unknown | Jumping Trains | 2011 | Yes | |
| I Got My License | JoJo | Joanna Levesque; Tony Dixon; Durrell Babbs; Christopher Breaux; Luke Boyd; Joseph Bereal | All I Want Is Everything | 2008 | Yes | |
| I Hate Love | JoJo | Dennis Matkosky; Erika Nuri; Dapo Torimiro | All I Want Is Everything | 2009 | Yes | |
| I Hate Love | JoJo | Andrew Hollander, Rune Westberg, and Dana Parish | Mad Love | 2014 | Yes | |
| I'm Fine | JoJo | Unknown | Mad Love | 2016 | Yes | |
| I Miss Your Sex | JoJo | Chris Ortiz | Mad Love | 2016 | Yes | |
| I Need To Know | JoJo | Rodney Jerkins | JoJo | 2003 | Yes | |
| Interview | JoJo | Joanna Levesque; Jordan Orvosh | Good to Know | 2018 | No | |
| I Remember | JoJo | Unknown | Mad Love | 2016 | Yes | |
| I Want Him On Top (Of My Life) | JoJo | James Washington | Jumping Trains | 2011 | No | |
| I Won't | JoJo | Joanna Levesque; Mason Levy; Jason Boyd | Mad Love | 2016 | Yes | |
| Impossible | JoJo | Unknown | Good to Know | 2017 | Yes | |
| Impossible to Love | JoJo | Warren Felder; Harvey Mason; Andre Merritt; Robert Allen | All I Want Is Everything | 2008 | Yes | |
| Instant Impact | JoJo | Joanna Levesque | Mad Love | 2016 | Yes | |
| Jaded | JoJo | Unknown | NGL | 2024 | Yes | |
| Jumping Trains | JoJo | Joanna Levesque; Nasri Atweh; Adam Messinger | Jumping Trains | 2010 | Yes | |
| Just Like Them | JoJo | Joanna Levesque; Gino Barletta; Mario Marchetti | Mad Love | 2014 | No | |
| Karma's Baby | JoJo | Unknown | Mad Love | 2016 | Yes | |
| Keep Forgetting to Forget About You | JoJo | Jordan Omley; Michael Mani | All I Want Is Everything | 2008 | Yes | |
| Kinda Shy | JoJo | Makeba Riddick; Cartsen Schack; Kenneth Kenneth | JoJo | 2003 | Yes | |
| Knock You Out | JoJo | Joanna Levesque; Jordan Orvosh | Good to Know | 2018 | No | |
| Last Call | JoJo | Jason Dean; Joseph Kirkland; Jazz Singh; Matthew Friedman | Mad Love | 2016 | Yes | |
| Last Heart Standing | JoJo | Gary Spriggs; Sean Marshall | Jumping Trains | 2010 | Yes | |
| Learning To Love | JoJo | Static Major | JoJo | 2003 | No | |
| Let It All Go | JoJo | Joanna Levesque; Gino Barletta; Scott Bruzenak | Mad Love | 2014 | Yes | |
| Lie to Me | JoJo | Joanna Levesque; Eric Bellinger; Ernest Clark; Marcos Enrique Palacios; Kevin Rudolph | Jumping Trains | 2010 | Yes | |
| Lifestyle | JoJo | Unknown | Trying Not to Think About It | 2021 | Yes | |
| Like I Do | JoJo | Linnea Mary Han Deb; Joy Neil Mitro Deb; Nikki Flores; Anton Malmberg Hård af Segerstad | Mad Love | 2016 | Yes (Snippet) | |
| Limbo | JoJo | Denarius "Motesart" Motes; Hasham "Sham" Hussain; Lauren Evans; Nikola Bedingfield | Jumping Trains | 2010 | Yes | |
| Living Legend | JoJo | Joanna Levesque; Jordan Omley; Michael Mani | All I Want Is Everything | 2009 | No | |
| Long Way Down | JoJo | Josh Monroy; Sid Tipton; Joanna Levesque | Mad Love | 2015 | Yes | |
| Love A Little Harder | JoJo | Joanna Levesque; Jonathan Yip; Kim Petras; Ray Romulus; Jeremy Reeves; Ray McCullough; Johan Wetterberg | Mad Love | 2014 | Yes | |
| Love Me Forever | JoJo | Joanna Levesque | Good to Know | 2018 | Yes | |
| Magic (Make Me Believe) | JoJo | Joanna Levesque; Gino Barletta; Matthew Newbill | Mad Love | 2016 | No | |
| Make A Woman Outta Me | JoJo | Joanna Levesque; Jordan Orvosh | Good to Know | 2018 | No | |
| Make Em Say | JoJo | Gary Spriggs; Sean Marshall; Courtney Harrell | Jumping Trains | 2011 | No | |
| Merry Christmas Babe | JoJo | Unknown | —N/a | 2015 | Yes | |
| Microphone | JoJo | Chloe Angelides; Dillion Pace; Heidi Rojas | Mad Love | 2015 | Yes | |
| Miss My Flight | JoJo | Nasri Atweh; Adam Messinger | All I Want Is Everything | 2009 | Yes | |
| More Time For Love | JoJo | Joseph Kirkland; Jussi Karvinen; Jason Dean | Mad Love | 2016 | No | |
| Mo(u)rning Glory | JoJo | Joanna Levesque; Gino Barletta; Scott Bruzenak | Mad Love | 2016 | Yes | |
| Mrs. | JoJo | Joanna Levesque; Gino Barletta; Matthew Newbill | Mad Love | 2016 | No | |
| My Hands | JoJo | Joanna Levesque; Jordan Orvosh | Good to Know | 2018 | No | |
| Never Enough | JoJo | Joanna Levesque; Denise Rich; Patrick J Bianco; Evan Bogart | All I Want Is Everything | 2008 | No | |
| Never Go Home Again | JoJo | Joanna Levesque; Jordan Orvosh | Good to Know | 2018 | No | |
| New Drugs | JoJo | Joanna Levesque; Trevor Brown; William Zaire Simmons | Good to Know | 2017 | Yes | |
| Nobody But You | JoJo | Joanna Levesque; Jonathan Yip; Heather Bright; Ray Romulus; Jeremy Reeves | Mad Love | 2014 | No | |
| Nobody Can Change Me | JoJo | Tish Hyman; Shaliek Rivers; Remo Green; Rashaun Ashley | —N/a | 2011 | Yes | |
| Notorious | JoJo | Joanna Levesque; Edwards Bernard Jr. | The High Road | 2006 | No | |
| No More Secrets | JoJo | Khristopher Riddick-Tynes; Joanna Levesque; Peter Harding | Good to Know | 2019 | No | |
| No More Tears | JoJo | Shaffer Smith; Charles Harmon | All I Want Is Everything | 2008 | Yes | |
| Numbers | JoJo | Shaffer Smith; Jonathan Rotem | All I Want Is Everything | 2008 | Yes | |
| Obey | JoJo | Joanna Levesque | Mad Love | 2016 | No | |
| One Time Thing | JoJo | Joanna Levesque; Jordan Orvosh | Good to Know | 2018 | No | |
| One More River | JoJo | Ina Wroldsen; Steve Mac | Mad Love | 2014 | No | |
| Over And Over | JoJo | Joanna Levesque; Jordan Orvosh | Good to Know | 2018 | No | |
| Quiet Moment | JoJo | Unknown | Good to Know | 2017 | No | |
| Stay | JoJo | Joanna Levesque; Edwards Bernard Jr. | The High Road | 2006 | No | |
| The Other Chick | JoJo | Joanna Levesque; Kayla Merry; Warren Felder; Andrew Wansel | Jumping Trains | 2010 | Yes | |
| The Other Chick (Zedd Remix) | JoJo | Joanna Levesque; Anton Zaslavski; Kayla Merry | Jumping Trains | 2010 | Yes | |
| One Time Thing | JoJo | Joanna Levesque; Jordan Orvosh | Good to Know | 2018 | No | |
| Over And Over | JoJo | Joanna Levesque; Jordan Orvosh | Good to Know | 2018 | No | |
| Painkiller | JoJo | Unknown | Mad Love | 2016 | Yes | |
| Paint (feat. Travis Garland) | JoJo | Unknown | Jumping Trains | 2011 | Yes | |
| Paper Airplanes | JoJo | Joanna Levesque; Edwin Serrano; Clinton Sparks | Jumping Trains | 2010 | Yes | |
| Perfect 10 | JoJo | Jordan Glen Carriere; Joanna Levesque; Aloma Steele | Good to Know | 2019 | No | |
| Pharmacy | JoJo | Joanna Levesque; Josh Monroy; Gino Barletta | Mad Love | 2016 | No | |
| Play This Twice | JoJo | Joanna Levesque; Nasri Atweh; Adam Messenger | Jumping Trains | 2010 | Yes | |
| pov | Ariana Grande | Tayla Parx; Oliver "Junior" Frid; Steven Franks; Tommy Brown | Good to Know | 2018 | No | |
| Polaroids & Cigarettes | JoJo | Hayley Warner; Jussi Karvinen; Jarrod Gorbel | Mad Love | 2015 | No | |
| Private Parts | JoJo | Joanna Levesque | Good to Know | 2019 | Yes | |
| Reason | JoJo | Joanna Levesque | Mad Love | 2014 | Yes | |
| Redflag | JoJo | Robin Hannibal | Mad Love | 2014 | Yes | |
| Relax | JoJo | Joanna Levesque; Josh Monroy | Mad Love | 2014 | Yes | |
| Remember My Name | JoJo | Joanna Levesque; Merna Bishouty; Dylan Wiggins; Martin McKinney | Good to Know | 2019 | Yes | |
| Right Time | JoJo | Joanna Levesque; Gino Barletta; Scott Bruzenak | Mad Love | 2016 | No | |
| Riot | JoJo | Joanna Levesque; Mischke J. Butler; Theron Otis Feemster; James Murray | All I Want Is Everything | 2009 | Yes | |
| Rockstar | JoJo | Joanna Levesque; Jordan Orvosh | Good to Know | 2018 | No | |
| Run | Marsha Ambrosius | Marsha Ambrosius; Jenna Andrews; Dillion Pace | Mad Love | 2014 | Yes | |
| Sanctify | JoJo | Andy Hollander; Dana Parish. | Mad Love | 2014 | Yes | |
| Safe with Me | JoJo | Joanna Levesque; Nasri Atweh; Adam Messinger | All I Want Is Everything | 2009 | Yes | |
| Scandalous | JoJo | Joanna Levesque; Jordan Orvosh | Good to Know | 2018 | No | |
| Sedona | JoJo | Joanna Levesque | Good to Know | 2017 | Yes | |
| Send It Back To You | JoJo | Joanna Levesque; Graham Edwards; Lauren Christy; Scott Spock | Jumping Trains | 2012 | No | |
| Sensitive | JoJo | Joanna Levesque | Good to Know | 2017 | Yes | |
| Sex As A Weapon | JoJo | Joanna Levesque; Ruth Anne Cunningham; Trevor Brown; William Zaire Simmons | Good to Know | 2017 | No | |
| Shades | JoJo | Joanna Levesque | All I Want Is Everything | 2009 | No | |
| Shame | JoJo | Joanna Levesque | Good to Know | 2019 | Yes | |
| Something in the Water | JoJo | Crystal Nicole Johnson; Jonathan Rotem | All I Want Is Everything | 2009 | Yes | |
| So Familiar | JoJo | Joanna Levesque; Jordan Orvosh | Good to Know | 2018 | No | |
| Space | JoJo | JoJo Levesque; Pharrell Williams | Mad Love | 2016 | Yes | |
| Superpower | JoJo | Unknown | Trying Not to Think About It | 2021 | Yes | |
| Stevie | JoJo | Unknown | Mad Love | 2014 | Yes | |
| Sway | JoJo | Justin Tranter; Julia Michaels; Felix Snow | Mad Love | 2016 | No | |
| Sweat | JoJo | Shaffer Smith; Reginald Perry | All I Want Is Everything | 2009 | Yes | |
| Sweet Melody | Little Mix | Tayla Parx; Peoples; MNEK; Morten “Rissi” Ristorp; Oliver Frid | Good to Know | 2018 | Yes | |
| Sweetest Hangover | JoJo | Unknown | Mad Love | 2015 | Yes | |
| Strip | JoJo | Joanna Levesque; Jonathan Yip; Kim Petras; Ray Romulus; Jeremy Reeves; Ray McCullough; Johan Wetterberg | Mad Love | 2014 | Yes | |
| Tell Me | JoJo | Joanna Levesque; Jonathan Yip; Kim Petras; Ray Romulus; Jeremy Reeves; Ray McCullough; Johan Wetterberg | Mad Love | 2014 | Yes | |
| That's My Limit | JoJo | Joanna Levesque; Rodney Jerkins | All I Want Is Everything | 2009 | No | |
| Therapy (Crying On The Dancefloor) | JoJo | Emanuel Kiriakou; Andrew Goldstein; Caroline Ailin; E. Kidd Bogart | Mad Love | 2015 | Yes | |
| Touch Down | Koda Kumi | Joanna Levesque; Toby Gad | All I Want Is Everything | 2009 | Yes | |
| Two Steps Back | JoJo | Gerard O’Connell; Tommy Baxter; Joanna Levesque; Anna Midgley; Tinashe Sibanda | Good to Know | 2017 | No | |
| Uncharted (featuring Lester Shaw) | JoJo | Lester Shaw; Bryan Michael Cox | All I Want Is Everything | 2009 | Yes | |
| Uneasy | JoJo | Joanna Levesque | Good to Know | 2019 | Yes | |
| Underneath | JoJo | Carla Nella; Arama Brown; Pixie Lott; Toby Gad | All I Want Is Everything | 2009 | Yes | |
| Undo | JoJo | Joanna Levesque; Gino Barletta; Scott Bruzenak | Mad Love | 2014 | No | |
| Untitled | JoJo | Joanna Levesque; Billy Steinberg; Josh Alexander | The High Road | 2006 | No | |
| Up Against The Wall | JoJo | Joanna Levesque; Floyd Nathenial Hills; James Washington | All I Want Is Everything | 2009 | No | |
| Validation | JoJo | Joanna Levesque; Samuel Gloade | Good to Know | 2019 | Yes (Snippet) | |
| Wait A Minute (For Your Love) | JoJo | Joanna Levesque; Jordan Gatsby | All I Want Is Everything | 2009 | Yes | |
| Waiting For You | JoJo | Joanna Levesque | Mad Love | 2016 | Yes | |
| Way That I'm Built | JoJo | Joanna Levesque; Jordan Orvosh | Good to Know | 2018 | No | |
| Were You High (featuring Skizzy Mars) | JoJo | Unknown | Mad Love | 2016 | Yes | |
| We Could | JoJo | Joanna Levesque; Joy Oladokun; Emily Weisband; Jordan Reynolds | Mad Love | 2016 | No | |
| What We Shouldn't Do | JoJo | Joanna Levesque; Harmony Samuels | Mad Love | 2014 | No | |
| What The Hell | JoJo | Joanna Levesque; Beau Dozier | All I Want Is Everything | 2009 | No | |
| Wrong Man for the Job | JoJo | Jordan Omley; Michael Mani | All I Want Is Everything | 2009 | Yes | |
| What You Do | Chrisette Michele | Shaffer Smith; Chuck Harmony | All I Want Is Everything | 2008 | Yes | |
| Who Cares | JoJo | Joanna Levesque | Good to Know | 2017 | Yes | |
| Who's Gonna Fight For Me | JoJo | Gary Spriggs; Sean Marshall | Jumping Trains | 2011 | Yes | |
| You've Got To Believe In Something (Sho I Can) | JoJo | Static Major | JoJo | 2003 | Yes (Snippet) | |

== See also ==
- JoJo discography
