= List of JoJo concert tours =

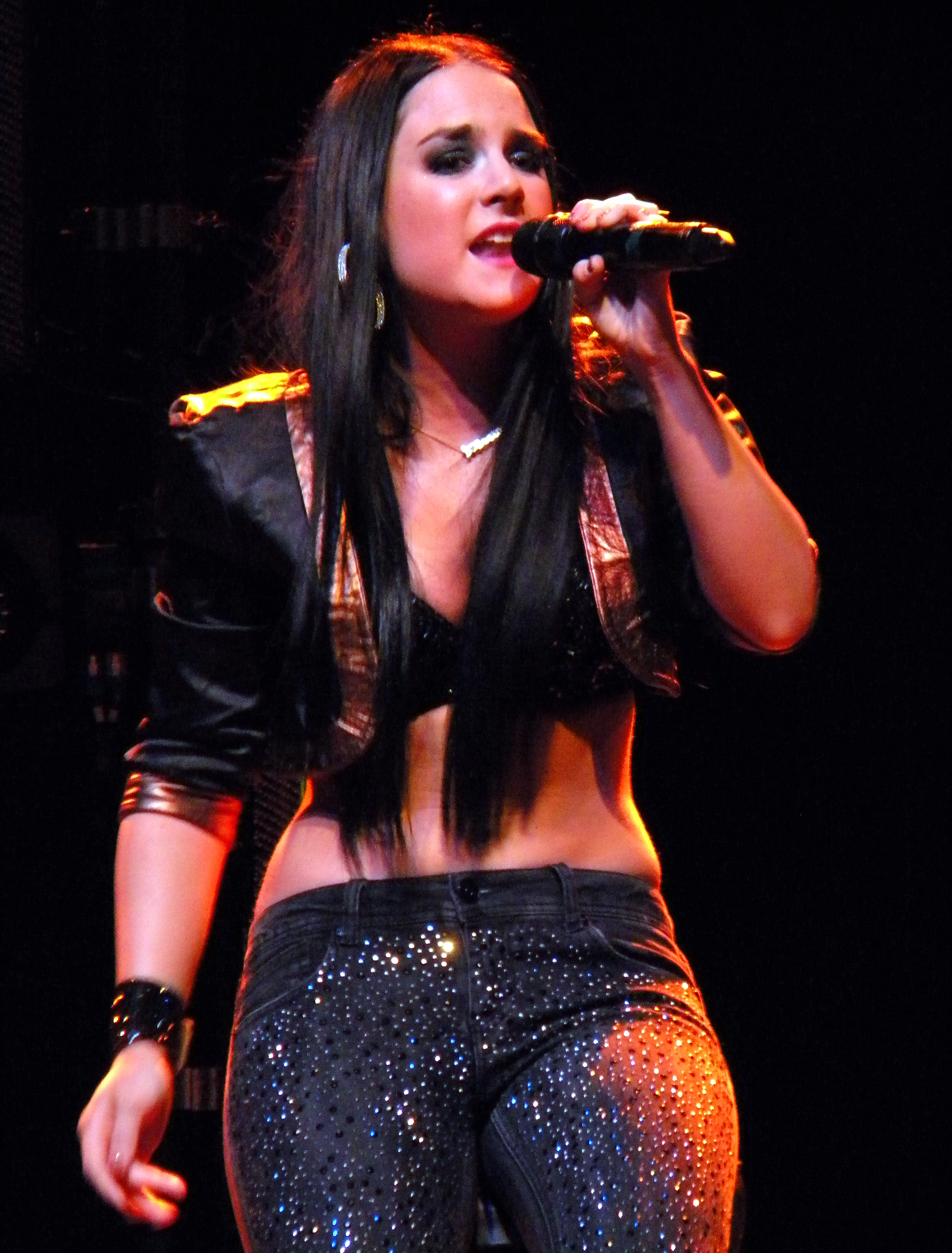
JoJo performing as the opening act on the tour

JoJo is an American Pop/R&B singer, songwriter and actress. Her first concert tour was across North America, where she performed at nine malls, starting at Atlanta's Northlake Mall and ending at South Shore Plaza in her home state. Later that year JoJo embarked on her first European Tour with Usher for Usher's Truth Tour where she was the opening act.

In 2011, she joined the Joe Jonas & Jay Sean Tour where she performed 19 shows Across North America as their opening act.

== Tours ==
Year	Title	Duration	Number of performances
2007	The High Road Tour	November 19, 2007(Brazil)	1
The High Road Tour was JoJo's first tour to promote her second studio album The High Road. The tour was only one show only in Brazil.
2010	Then & Now Concert Tour	May 15, 2010 (Manila)	1
The THEN AND NOW Massive Music Festival is an all-hits show— not an album tour, nor is it a promo tour. Expect a great deal of show, as all our featured artists will be performing nothing but their hits just for their fans in the Philippines.The THEN AND NOW Massive Music Festival happens on Saturday, May 15, 2010, at the SM Mall of Asia Concert Grounds. The THEN AND NOW Massive Music Festival 2010 featuring JoJo, Frankie J, Baby Bash, Diana King, SWV, P.M. Dawn, All-4-One and V Factory
2013	The Agápē Tour	September 2, 2013 – September 9, 2013 (North America)	6
In support of JoJo's second mixtape Agápē, JoJo embarked on The Agápē Tour, a nationwide tour hitting the East Coast, Canada and other cities in the USA. On August 28, 2013, JoJo announced the first five tour dates entitled The "Agape Tour" via her official Twitter page with special guest Leah Labelle as the opening act. More dates are yet to be announced
2015–16	The I Am JoJo Tour	November 2, 2015 – December 20, 2015 (North America); March 1, 2016 – March 7, 2016 (Europe)	31
In anticipation of her upcoming third studio album, the singer will embark on a North American tour. The 23-date “I Am JoJo” trek kicks off Nov. 2 in Minneapolis and travels to theaters across the country, with stops in New York, Chicago, St. Louis, Los Angeles, Atlanta, Houston, and Toronto, wrapping Dec. 20 in New Orleans.
2017	Mad Love Tour	January 15, 2017 – February 1, 2017 (Europe); February 15, 2017 – May 3, 2017 (North America)	69
In support of her third studio album Mad Love., JoJo embarked on the 60-date "Mad Love World Tour" throughout Europe and North America. The first leg of the tour began on Jan. 15 in Dublin, Ireland and traveled across the UK for the month before concluding on Feb. 1 in London. The second leg of the tour largely takes place in North America and began on Feb. 15 in Portland, OR and travels to clubs and theatres across the country stopping in Seattle, San Francisco, Los Angeles, San Diego, Milwaukee, Chicago, Washington, Houston and more wrapping up in Huntington, NY on May 3. Craig Stickland and Stanaj were announced as opening acts for the UK and US leg of the tour respectively.
2018	Leaks, Covers and Mixtapes Tour	May 29, 2018 – June 26, 2017	15
In between recording material for her fourth studio album. The tour will showcase and support rarely performed material from JoJo's independently released catalogue including her two mixtapes Can't Take That Away From Me (2010) and Agápē (2012), her two EPs, LoveJo (2014) and LoveJo2 (2015), as well as songs JoJo has covered during her career and unreleased material that leaked during the recording sessions for JoJo's third studio album, while still contracted under Blackground Records.
2021	Trying Not To Think About It Tour	1 October - 11 October 2021	6
Supporting her Trying Not to Think About It EP-Album
2022	Jojo Tour 2022	1-23 March 2022	3
Supporting her Trying Not to Think About It EP-Album
2025	Too Much To Say Tour	9th March - 10 April 2025	22
Supporting her NGL EP

== Opening act ==
Year	Title	Promoting album	Leg	Set list
2004	Usher's Truth Tour	JoJo	North America and Oceanic (select venues)	"Breezy" "Baby It's You" "Weak" "Leave (Get Out)"
2011	Joe Jonas & Jay Sean Tour	Jumping Trains	North America	"Leave (Get Out)" "Marvins Room (Can't Do Better)" "Disaster" "Lie To Me" "Too Little Too Late" "Boy Without A Heart"(Encore)
2012	Better With U Tour	Jumping Trains	North America	"Lie To Me" "Leave (Get Out)" "Disaster" "Jumping Trains" "Sexy to Me" "Too Little Too Late"
2016	The 7/27 Tour	Mad Love	North America	"When Love Hurts" "Baby It's You" "Leave (Get Out)" "Disaster" "Marvins Room" (Drake Cover) "I Am" "Too Little Too Late" "Fuck Apologies"

== Special guest ==
Year	Title	Promoting album	Leg	Set list	Notes
2010	Shock Value II Tour	Shock Value II	1	"Lose Control" Featuring JoJo	
2011	Changing Lives: Timbaland Shock Value II Tour	Shock Value II	1	"Lose Control" Featuring JoJo "Too Little Too Late"	benefit concert headlined by Timbaland performed at Mall Of Asia Concert Grounds in the city of Manila.
2025	Jonas20: Greetings from Your Hometown Tour	Greetings from Your Hometown	1	"Leave (Get Out)" and "Vacation Eyes"	

== Promo tours ==
Year	Title	Promoting album	Setlist	Notes
2004	The Cingular Buddy Bash	JoJo	N/A	The tour went to nine malls, starting at Atlanta's Northlake Mall and ending at South Shore Plaza.
2007	Six Flags Starburst Thursday Night Concert	The High Road	N/A	JoJo performed a melody of these songs and artists Beyoncé ("Déjà Vu"), Kelly Clarkson ("Since U Been Gone"), SWV, Gnarls Barkley, Jackson 5, Justin Timberlake ("My Love"), Maroon 5 ("Makes Me Wonder"), Usher, Carlos Santana, Jill Scott, Michael Jackson, George Benson, Musiq Soulchild, and Amy Winehouse ("Rehab", replacing the title with "Boston")
2012	JoJo Live at the Roxy	Agápē	"Leave (Get Out)" "Anything" "Baby It's You" "Boy Without A Heart" "Weak"(SWV cover) "Disaster" "Houstatlantavegas"(Drake cover) "Marvin's Room"(Drake cover) "Andre" "White Girl In Paris" "Prototype / Night & Day"(Frank Sinatra cover) "We Get By" "Demonstrate" "Lie to Me"; Encore:"Too Little Too Late"	In promotion for her second mixtape Agápē, JoJo headlined a rare show at The Roxy in West Hollywood, with recording artists Leah LaBelle and Downtown Drive opening the show as the supporting acts.

== Charity concerts ==
Year	Title	Setlist	Notes
2005	The Hope Rocks concert	TBA	
2011	Girls Who Rock	"Leave (Get Out)" "Boy Without A Heart" "Jumping Trains" "Too Little Too Late"	
2011	Pinktober	"Leave (Get Out)" "Disaster" "Jumping Trains" "Cover songs" "Too Little Too Late"	On October 18, 2011 it was announced that JoJo would be performing a series of 7 free shows to benefit breast cancer awareness month (Pinktober) at Hard Rock Café locations across the country. The tour kicked off on October 24 in Baltimore, before heading to Washington DC, Boston, Pittsburgh, Detroit, Indianapolis, and Chicago. She performed some of her past hits such as “Too Little Too Late” and “Leave (Get Out),” her new single “Disaster,” and other songs from then forthcoming album. Fans were able to purchase copies of her CD single “Disaster” to have been autographed at each event.
