= Leaks, Covers and Mixtapes Tour =

2018 concert tour by JoJo

Leaks, Covers & Mixtapes Tour
- Tour by JoJo
- Promotional poster for the tour
- Associated album: Can't Take That Away from Me Agápē #LoveJo #LoveJo2
- Start date: May 29, 2018
- End date: June 26, 2018
- Legs: 1
- No. of shows: 15 in North America

JoJo concert chronology
- Mad Love Tour (2017); Leaks, Covers & Mixtapes Tour (2018); Trying Not to Think About It Tour (2021)

The Leaks, Covers & Mixtapes Tour is the fifth headlining concert tour by American recording artist JoJo. In between recording material for her fourth studio album. The tour will showcase and support rarely performed material from JoJo's independently released catalogue including her two mixtapes Can't Take That Away From Me (2010) and Agápē (2012), her two EPs, LoveJo (2014) and LoveJo2 (2015), as well as songs JoJo has covered during her career and unreleased material that leaked during the recording sessions for JoJo's third studio album, while still contracted under Blackground Records.

== Background ==
Following her release from Blackground Records in 2014, JoJo had since expressed interest in doing something special to commemorate all the leaked tracks that surfaced online during the recording process of her third studio album. Unfinished demos and recordings begun surfacing online since mid 2009 with some as recent as 2017. The tracks had developed a cult following with JoJo's fan base and were always requested at shows and meet and greets with fans.

On April 28, 2018, JoJo officially announced tour dates for the 'Leaks, Covers and Mixtapes Tour' through all her social media channels. In a statement JoJo expressed her excitement to finally be able to perform these songs live for the first time, "This tour is especially for everyone who rocked with me when my hands were tied and my voice was silenced… thought it’d be mad fun to perform these songs since they were such a massive part of my life and you have always shown such passion for them." The tour kicked off May 29, 2018 in Anaheim and hit cities like Los Angeles, San Francisco, and Minneapolis before continuing across the U.S. for dates in New York, Atlanta, and Austin. Finally, the trek wrapped up on June 26, 2018, in Dallas. Pre-sale tickets were made available on April 25, 2018, through JoJo's official website while general public tickets were released on Friday, April 27, 2018. On May 11, 2018, JoJo officially announced that Malia Civetz would be serving as the opening act for the duration of the tour.

== Opening Acts ==
- Malia Civetz
- Phony People (select dates)

== Set list ==
This set list is representative of the performance on May 29, 2018. It is not representative of all concerts for the duration of the show.

1. "Back Words"
2. "I Hate Love"
3. "In The Dark"
4. "Safe With Me"
5. "Underneath"
6. "When Does It Go Away"
7. "Back2thebeginningagain"
8. "Take The Canyon"
9. "Can’t Handle The Truth "
10. "Thinking Out Loud"
11. "Billions"
12. "Paint"
13. "Wonder Woman"
14. "Rock The Boat" (Aaliyah cover)
15. "Houstantlantavegas"
16. "Marvin’s Room (Can’t Do Better)" (Drake cover)
17. "Caught Up In The Rapture"
18. "25 To Life"
19. "The Other Chick"
20. "Paper Airplanes"
21. "Miss My Flight"
22. "Limbo"
23. "Obey"
24. "Demonstrate"
25. "Boy Without A Heart"

== Tour dates ==
List of concerts, showing date, city, country, venue, tickets sold, number of available tickets and amount of gross revenue
Date	City	Country	Venue	Opening Acts	Attendance	Revenue
North America
May 29, 2018	Anaheim	United States	House of Blues	Malia Civets	—N/a	—N/a
May 30, 2018	Los Angeles	United States	The Teragram Ballroom	Malia Civets	—N/a	—N/a
June 1, 2018	San Francisco	United States	Great American Music Hall	Malia Civets	—N/a	—N/a
June 4, 2018	Portland	United States	Wonder Ballroom	Malia Civets	—N/a	—N/a
June 5, 2018	Seattle	United States	Neumos	Malia Civets	—N/a	—N/a
June 8, 2018	Minneapolis	United States	Fine Line Music Cafe	Malia Civets	—N/a	—N/a
June 10, 2018	Chicago	United States	Lincoln Hall	Malia Civets	—N/a	—N/a
June 12, 2018	Washington D.C.	United States	Union Stage	Malia Civets	—N/a	—N/a
June 13, 2018	Philadelphia	United States	Union Transfer	Malia Civets	—N/a	—N/a
June 16, 2018	Boston	United States	The Sinclair	Malia Civets	—N/a	—N/a
June 17, 2018	Brooklyn	United States	Music Hall of Williamsburg	Malia Civets	—N/a	—N/a
June 19, 2018	New York	United States	Bowery Ballroom	Malia Civets	—N/a	—N/a
June 22, 2018	Atlanta	United States	Terminal West	Malia Civets	—N/a	—N/a
June 25, 2018	Austin	United States	Antone's	Malia Civets	—N/a	—N/a
June 26, 2018	Dallas	United States	Trees	Malia Civets	—N/a	—N/a
