= The Agápē Tour =

2013 concert tour by JoJo

- Tour by JoJo
- Location: North America
- Associated album: Agápē
- Start date: October 2, 2013
- End date: October 9, 2013
- Legs: 1
- No. of shows: 6

JoJo concert chronology
- The High Road Tour (2007); The Agápē Tour (2013); I Am JoJo Tour (2015)

The Agápē Tour was the second headlining concert tour by American singer-songwriter JoJo. It was launched in support of her second mixtape Agápē (2012). The tour visited just six cities; an expected expansion to the East Coast of the US and to Canada never materialized.

== Background ==
In an interview with TheYoungFolks.com on January 4, 2013, JoJo expressed plans to go on a nationwide tour hitting the East Coast, Canada and other cities in the USA. She met with her agency in January to sort out a specific route for the tour. On August 28, 2013 JoJo announced the first five West Coast tour dates entitled The "Agape Tour" via her official Twitter page with special guest Leah Labelle as the opening act. Tickets went on sale the same day.

== Opening act ==
- Leah Labelle

== Set list ==
1. "Baby It's You"
2. "Leave (Get Out)"
3. "Anything"
4. "Marvins Room (Can't Do Better)"
5. "Boy Without a Heart"
6. "Like That"
7. "Homeboy"
8. "Rock the Boat" (Aaliyah cover)
9. "Never Say Goodbye"
10. "Billions"
11. "Thinking Out Loud"
12. "The Sweetest Taboo" (Sade cover)
13. "Demonstrate"
14. "Too Little Too Late"

Encore

15. "Andre"
16. "Weak" (a cappella)

- During the first show in Tempe, Arizona, JoJo performed the full version of "Weak".
- During the third show in Oakland, California, JoJo only performed half of both "Andre" and "Weak".
- During the final show in Seattle, Washington, JoJo paid tribute to Nirvana with a cover of the hometown band's classic "Smells Like Teen Spirit", which they performed at the same venue in 1992.

== Tour dates ==
| Date | City | Country | Venue |
|---|---|---|---|
North America
| October 2, 2013 | Tempe | United States | Club Red |
| October 3, 2013 | Los Angeles | United States | Tru Hollywood |
| October 4, 2013 | Oakland | United States | Grand Live at Venue Oakland |
| October 5, 2013 | Sacramento | United States | The Assembly |
| October 8, 2013 | Portland | United States | Alhambra Theatre |
| October 9, 2013 | Seattle | United States | The Crocodile |
