= Joanna (JoJo song) =

Single by JoJo
- Released: October 11, 2019
- Genre: Freestyle; R&B
- Length: 2:08
- Label: Clover Music; Warner Bros.
- Songwriters: Joanna Levesque; Natalie Dunn; Rebekah Muhammad; Jeff Gitelman
- Producer: Jeff Gitelman

JoJo singles chronology
"Say So" (2019)	"Joanna" (2019)	"Sabotage" (2019)

Music video
- "Joanna" on YouTube

"Joanna" is a song recorded by American singer-songwriter JoJo, released on October 11, 2019 by Clover Music and Warner Bros. Records. The song marks her first original release since the creation of Clover Music and the singer signing to Warner Bros. Records.

== Background ==
Following the release of her third studio album Mad Love, JoJo announced the creation of her record label imprint, Clover Music, in a joint deal with Interscope. It later moved to Warner Bros. Records. "Joanna" is the singer's first original release under the label.

On December 21, 2018 JoJo's first two studio albums were re-released with re-recorded vocals and slightly reworked production in order to coincide with the singer's 28th birthday. The albums were re-recorded due to Blackground Records' removing of both of the records from all music platforms following the singer's disputes with the label. Work on the singer's fourth studio album began shortly after the re-releases. "Joanna" was announced the day prior to its release.

== Composition ==
"Joanna" was written by JoJo, Natalie Dunn, Rebekah Muhammad, and Jeff Gitelman, the latter of whom produced the track. Musically, "Joanna" has been described as a freestyle and R&B ballad with "raw" and "stripped-down" instrumentation led by a "bluesy" guitar riff. The musical arrangement of the song was compared to the songs found on the singer's previous mixtapes. The lyrical content of "Joanna" centers around the comments of haters, music critics, and fans. Singing in the third person, singer mocks the opinions of others in the lyrics "Where did your acting career go? / You were supposed to be somebody / You were supposed to make more money". "Joanna" has also been interpreted as a response to cancel culture.

== Critical reception ==
Madeline Roth, writing for MTV, called the single a "clever, confident response to cancel culture". Allison Stubblebine of Nylon wrote the song "addresses all the negativity that has been thrown [JoJo's] way regarding her career". Mike Wass, writing for Idolator referred to the song as a "hard-hitting track" and a "tantalizing first glimpse of the 'When Love Hurts' hitmaker's new era". Clare Palo of Vulture referred to the lyrics as "so raw that it seemed almost necessary to start out with a brutally honest take for her never 'Too Little, Too Late' comeback".

== Music video ==
A music video was released alongside the single. The video, directed by Se Oh, features hordes of fans rushing past the singer towards an unknown celebrity's car in front of a theater. The singer winks at the camera during the video's conclusion to indicate the release of new music.

== Personnel ==
Adapted from Tidal.

- JoJo – vocals, composition
- Jeff Gitelman – composition, production
- Natalie Dunn – composition
- Rebekah Muhammad – composition
- Tony Maserati – mixing
- Miles Comaskey – mix engineering
- Dale Becker – mastering
- Hector Vega – mastering
- Ryann Fretschel – mastering

== Charts ==
Chart (2019)	Peak position
US R&B Digital Songs (Billboard)	14
