= Stevie Mackey =

American singer and vocal coach (born 1981)

- Birth name: Stephen D. Mackey II
- Born: October 18, 1981 (age 43); Los Angeles, California, U.S.
- Origin: California, U.S.
- Occupation(s): Singer, vocal coach and performance coach
- Website: steviemackey.com

Stephen D. Mackey II (born October 18, 1981), professionally known as Stevie Mackey, is an American singer, vocal coach, and vocal producer.

He is known for his vocal coachwork on NBC's reality-competition television show The Voice for over ten seasons, and coaching Jennifer Lopez for her It's My Party tour. He also appeared on BET's reality-television series Love & Hip Hop: Hollywood, as well as BET's reality-television docuseries Chasing Destiny with Kelly Rowland.

He has worked with artists, including Christina Milian, Fergie, Selena Gomez, and Moniece Slaughter.

== Early life and education ==
Mackey was born in Los Angeles, California. His mother was a teacher, and his father was a physical therapist.

He grew up in a family of Christian singers, where singing classic Christmas songs and carols was a significant part of his life.

Mackey is a graduate of Oakwood University, located in Huntsville, Alabama.

== Career ==
Mackey began his music career as a backing vocalist, performing with Lalah Hathaway, Whitney Houston, and Michael Jackson.

He has been a vocal coach on The Voice for over ten seasons, and in 2019, he traveled the world coaching Lopez for her It's My Party tour.

In addition to his work as a vocal coach, Mackey released his debut album, The Most Wonderful Time, in 2020, a collection of his favorite holiday songs.

He also hosts a cappella parties, called "Taco Tuesdays", at his home, which serve as a source of inspiration and support for the artist community. He created a thirty-day digital vocal coaching program featured on the platform Monthly, in which he covers runs, songwriting, and more musical topics.
