= III (JoJo EP) =

EP by JoJo
- Released: August 21, 2015
- Length: 10:57
- Label: Atlantic
- Producer: Benny Blanco; Jason Evigan; Harmony Samuels; The Family

JoJo chronology
LoveJo (2014)	III (2015)	LoveJo2 (2015)

Singles from III
- 1. "When Love Hurts" Released: August 21, 2015

III (stylized as III. and pronounced as Tringle) is the second extended play (EP) by American singer JoJo. It was released through Atlantic Records on August 21, 2015, after long dispute between her previous record label Blackground Records. The EP consists of three songs, "When Love Hurts", "Save My Soul", and "Say Love".

== Background and composition ==
After a prolonged dispute with her former label, Blackground Records, JoJo returned to the recording studio to work on new material. She had originally released her first two albums, JoJo (2004) and The High Road (2006), through the label, but remained contractually unable to leave following her second release. Having first signed her recording contract at the age of 12, she later exited the agreement and subsequently signed with Atlantic Records. Prior to III, she independently released the mixtape Agápē (2012) and the EP #LoveJo (2014).

Works on III involved collaborations with producers and songwriters including the Family, Benny Blanco, Jason Evigan, Diane Warren, and MNEK. JoJo described experimenting across styles while aiming for cohesion, noting her interest in dance and house influences and the need to find "the right blend". About the EP, she depicted it as a "triangle" of three singles intended to showcase different styles, serving as an "appetizer" for a forthcoming full-length project. III's songs include elements of diva pop, with "When Love Hurts" complemented by mid-tempo ballads like "Say Love" and "Save My Soul".

== Promotion ==
Prior to the release, JoJo had announced that she would release her new album through Atlantic Records. She performed live for several singles at iHeartMedia Music Summit on August 5, 2015 and invited her fans in a listening party with a hashtag #JoJoFansFirstSweeps, where they could premiere the album. She had visited across five cities, starting with Boston on August 12. She had since been performing at several clubs, attending several interviews with Teen Vogue, Jezebel, MTV, VH1, Time, and Billboard.

"When Love Hurts" impacted on Mainstream radio in the United States on November 17, 2015, as the EP's lead single. JoJo released the song's music video via MTV on September 28, alongside remixes of the song by several artists, including Sweater Beats. "When You Say Love" peaked at number 7 on the US Hot Dance Club Songs, number 27 on Pop Digital Songs, number 23 on Dance Club Songs chart. A music video for "Say Love" was released on October 27. The song peaked at number 33 on Pop Digital Songs chart on September 12. "Save My Soul"'s music video was released on January 8, 2016, and the song peaked at number 33 on Pop Digital Songs chart. The songs included in III premiered on JoJo's official SoundCloud page on August 20, 2015, being released a day later to all digital retailers ahead of her third studio album Mad Love (2016).

On October 5, 2015, JoJo announced her second major nationwide tour, entitled I Am JoJo Tour. The tour visited 23 cities all across North America beginning on November 2 at Minneapolis's Triple Rock Social Club and ran through the end of the year, wrapping up on JoJo's 25th Birthday on December 20 at the Hi Ho Lounge in New Orleans.

== Track listing ==
Standard track listing
No.	Title	Writer(s)	Producer(s)	Length
1.	"When Love Hurts"	Benjamin Levin; Jason Evigan; Ryn Weaver; Ammar Malik; Daniel Omelio	Benny Blanco; Evigan	3:35
2.	"Save My Soul"	JoJo; Nikki Flores; Anton Malmberg Hård af Segerstad; Joy Deb; Linnea Deb	The Family	3:44
3.	"Say Love"	Harmony Samuels; Wayne Hector; Chloe Angelides	Samuels	3:38
Total length:				10:57

Spotify extra commentary
No.	Title	Length
4.	"The Story of III."	3:21
Total length:		14:18

== Release history ==
Region	Date	Format(s)	Label	Ref.
Various	August 21, 2015	Digital download; streaming	Atlantic	
