= Sabotage (JoJo song) =

Single by JoJo featuring Chika
- Released: October 25, 2019
- Recorded: 2019
- Genre: R&B
- Length: 3:45
- Label: Warner; Clover Music
- Songwriters: Joanna Levesque; Chika; Dan Wilson; Dylan Wiggins; Martin McKinney; Merna Bishouty; Michael Sonier
- Producer: Doc McKinney

JoJo singles chronology
"Joanna" (2019)	"Sabotage" (2019)	"Man" (2020)

Chika singles chronology
"Higher" (2019)	"Sabotage" (2019)

Music video
- "Sabotage" on YouTube

"Sabotage" is a song by American R&B singer-songwriter JoJo featuring American rapper Chika. The song is JoJo's second original release after "Joanna" and since founding her own label imprint Clover Music with Warner Records. "Sabotage" was released on October 25, 2019. It was written by Joanna Levesque, Dan Wilson, Dylan Wiggins, Martin McKinney, Merna Bishouty, Michael Sonier and Chika, while production was helmed by Doc McKinney, Dylan Wiggins and Mike Sonier. Vocal production was done by Merna Bishouty.

== Background ==
Following the re-recording and re-release of her first two album in 2018 through her own record label imprint Clover Music. JoJo began work on her fourth studio album shortly after, she rented an Airbnb and started writing and recording the album with some of her "favorite creative friends". "Joanna" was released on October 11, 2019 as the singers first introduction into the new album era and first original release under Clover Music. Joanna was released as a buzz single and will not appear on JoJo's fourth studio album Good to Know (which was unannounced at that time). The song's music video premiere was live streamed through YouTube the following day, with JoJo announcing the release of "Sabotage" at the conclusion of the videos premiere as the official lead single from her upcoming album.

"Sabotage" was officially released on October 25, 2019. In describing the song JoJo explains "A lot of people self-sabotage. I tend to do it in romantic relationships... And I think most of it roots to fear – fear of being inadequate, fear of getting hurt, fear of rejection, fear of not measuring up... This song is about asking a lot of questions, dealing with shame and embarrassment, and really just owning up to certain patterns".

== Composition ==
Musically, "Sabotage" is a soulful, hip hop influenced R&B song with a "dark" bassline throughout the verses before grooving in the chorus. The lyrical content, which has been described as confessional, examines the singer's past relationships and exes. "Sabotage" was written by Dan Wilson, Dylan Wiggins, Martin McKinney, Merna Bishouty, Michael Sonier, Chika and Joanna "JoJo" Levesque for the latter's long-awaited upcoming fourth studio album. The song includes additional vocals from American rapper Chika, while production was handled by Doc McKinney. Dylan Wiggins and Mike Sonier. The track was recorded by Ryan Gladieux in Los Angeles, California along with Evan Bradford and Omar Loya. The mixing of "Sabotage" was done by Tony Maserati with Miles Comaskey as the song's mixing engineer. The mastering was done by Dale Becker and was assisted by Hector Vega and Ryann Fretschel. Merna Bishouty served as the song's vocal producer.

== Critical reception ==
"Sabotage" received critical acclaim from contemporary music critics, with many praising its raw and confessional commentary and hip hop infused sound. Sajae Elder from The Fader magazine called the track "similarly vulnerable", in comparison to JoJo's previously released singled "Joanna". Noah C of HotNewHipHop praised its "dark bassline that creeps across the verses and accumulates a groove in the chorus" while also coining the song as "another soaring bop". Tyler Schmitt from Variance Magazine regarded the song as "simmering". Rania Aniftos from Billboard called the song "vulnerable" and 'smooth". Madeline Roth from MTV News provided a positive review for the "soulful confessional" tune, praising the song's content as "equally raw" as the previously released "Joanna". Roth went on to praise CHIKA's "introspective bars of her own", while concluding that "there's something beautifully old-school about 'Sabotage,' and it's refreshing to hear a pop artist really dive into honest self-awareness".

Bianca Betancourt of Teen Vogue praised the song's "refreshingly intimate lyrical direction from JoJo while not sacrificing the sultry, powerhouse vocals she's been owning her entire career". Idolator’s Mike Wass called JoJo a "vocal queen" stating that "self-reflection is a rare commodity in popular music" and describing the song as "achingly honest". Wass went on to claim JoJo as the next Teena Marie of the 2010s calling it "wonderfully old school".

== Music video ==
A music video for "Sabotage" was released on December 4, 2019. A snippet from "Small Things" can be heard at the end of the video.

== Track listing ==
Explicit single
No.	Title	Writer(s)	Producer(s)	Length
1.	"Sabotage" (featuring Chika)	Joanna Levesque; Chika; Dan Wilson; Dylan Wiggins; Martin McKinney; Merna Bishouty; Michael Sonier	Doc McKinney	3:45
Total length:				3:45

Live acoustic single
No.	Title	Writer(s)	Producer(s)	Length
1.	"Sabotage" (live acoustic)	Levesque; Chika; Wilson; Wiggins; McKinney; Bishouty; Sonier	Doc McKinney	3:54
2.	"Sabotage" (featuring Chika)	Levesque; Chika; Wilson; Wiggins; McKinney; Bishouty; Sonier	Doc McKinney	3:45
Total length:				7:37

== Credits and personnel ==
Credits adapted from YouTube.

- JoJo – vocals, writing, vocal production
- Chika – vocals, writing
- Dan Wilson – writing
- Dylan Wiggins – writing
- Martin McKinney – writing
- Merna Bishouty – writing
- Michael Sonier – writing
- Tony Maserati – mixing
- Ryan Gladieux – recording
- Doc McKinney – producer
- Alex Ernewin – keyboard
- Evan Bradford – recording
- Miles Comaskey – mixing engineer
- Omar Loya – recording
- Dale Becker – audio mastering
- Hector Vega – assistant mastering
- Ryann Fretschel – assistant mastering

== Charts ==
Chart (2019)	Peak position
US R&B Digital Songs (Billboard)	18

== Release history ==
Region	Date	Version	Format	Label	Ref.
Various	October 25, 2019	Explicit	Digital download; streaming	Clover Music; Warner	
Various	December 20, 2019	Live acoustic	Digital download; streaming	Clover Music; Warner	
