= LoveJo =

#LoveJo

EP by JoJo
- Released: February 14, 2014
- Length: 16:22
- Label: Atlantic
- Producers: Da Internz; Stevie Mackey

JoJo chronology
Agápē (2012)	#LoveJo (2014)	III (2015)

#LoveJo is the debut extended play (EP) by American singer JoJo. It was released for digital download on February 14, 2014, as a free Valentine's Day gift to JoJo's fans for all their support over the years. It marked JoJo's first official release since she was released from her contract with Blackground Records and signed to Atlantic Records. The four-track EP includes three covers of various classic songs including songs of the artists such as Anita Baker and Phil Collins.

== Composition ==
#LoveJo opens with a spoken intro which is a poem written by author Aeni, while R&B singer Marsha Ambrosius produced the tracks melody. JoJo speaks in a sultry voice "that sucks you right in", "Rest your head and close your eyes / Everything will be okay / For when you wake with the sweet sunrise / It will be a brand new day." "Caught Up in the Rapture" is a jazzy-R&B song, recorded by American R&B singer Anita Baker included from her second album Rapture (1986). The track was written by Gary Glenn and Dianne Quander, while Da Internz handled the song's production. Idolator stated the song "dissolves into glitchy loops" before transitioning into the next track, a cover of Phil Collins's song "Take Me Home". Time magazine called JoJo's version "a clear standout" on the EP, continuing calling it "all militant stomp buried under ambient noise; her voice soars and crashes over the glitchy, stuttering beat. It's not the most obvious love song, but who cares – it's good." Its lyrics refer to a patient in a mental institution, and it is based on the novel One Flew Over the Cuckoo's Nest. The EP finishes with JoJo's "gospel-inflected" rendition of the "spiritual" 1991 song "Glory" inspired by opera singer Kathleen Battle. Produced by JoJo's long-time friend and vocal coach Stevie Mackey, the song sees JoJo's "soothing vocals soar and really bring out the goosebumps teasing us of her outstanding talent and what is to come".

== Promotion ==
Following its surprise release, JoJo performed tracks from #LoveJo for the first time live at the 2014 South by Southwest music festival on March 15. Her second live performance of the tracks was on March 22, 2014, during VH1's Save the Music Foundation's "Family Day", and that same night at Perez Hilton's birthday party.

== Critical reception ==
#LoveJoJo received rave reviews from music critics. Sam Lansky from Time said that it sees JoJo "interpreting classic songs with inventive production and, as ever, chill-inducing vocals". He noted that JoJo's time away from the limelight, due to her constant label drama, has given her "the raw talent to rule 2014". In writing for Idolator, Christina Lee said that the EP "is respectful of R&B tradition and is tastefully modern at the same time". Joe Hopkins of UK online magazine Hit the Floor gave #LoveJo a 9/10 rating, writing: "JoJo's voice has clearly developed from her 'Leave (Get Out)' days but still remains light and delicate." In the review, Hopkins said, "The shifts between falsetto and the runs are exquisite. However, not to forget the production from Da Internz which is completely ingenious." Nylon magazine's Liza Darwin also went on to compare the EP to JoJo's early beginnings, stating "It's a far cry from 'Leave (Get Out)', but we're not mad about it... The bottom line? This girl is good, and we can't wait to hear what she's serving up next."

== Track listing ==
#LoveJo track listing
No.	Title	Writer(s)	Producer(s)	Length
1.	"Intro"	Aeni	Da Internz	0:53
2.	"Caught Up in the Rapture"	Gary Glenn; Dianne Quander	Da Internz	6:25
3.	"Take Me Home"	Phil Collins	Da Internz	5:06
4.	"Glory"	Traditional	Stevie Mackey	3:58
Total length:				16:22

== Personnel ==
Credits were adapted from JoJo's SoundCloud page.

- JoJo – lead vocals
- Da Internz – producer
- Brian Ziff – art direction, photography
- Lisa Zogalis – hair stylist
- Chrissy Zogalis – make up
- Joey Thao – stylist
- Lee England Jr. – violin
- Stevie Mackey – vocal production, producer
- Affordable Healthcare – music
- Kevin Randolph – piano
- Tony "Chicago" Russell – bass
- Zach Nicholls – recording, mixing
- Marsha Ambrosius – additional production
- Mark Pelli – guitar
