= LoveJo2 =

EP by JoJo
- Released: December 18, 2015
- Recorded: 2015
- Length: 15:15
- Label: Atlantic
- Producer: Noisecastle III; Austin Brown; JordanXL; Devin Cruise; Soraya LaPread

JoJo chronology
III (2015)	LoveJo2 (2015)	Mad Love (2016)

#LoveJo2 is the third extended play (EP) by American singer JoJo, Released on December 18, 2015 by Atlantic Records. It is the follow-up to her 2014 EP #LoveJo. The EP contains four tracks and was released in honor of the singer's 25th birthday as part of her third studio album.

== Information ==
The song "Thinkin Out Loud" was originally released as an interlude on JoJo's second mixtape, Agápē in 2012. JoJo has stated that insecurity about her vocal performance led her to not release the song in its entirety. The second track on the EP is a cover of Soul II Soul's 1989 single, "Back to Life (However Do You Want Me)". "Right On Time" is a 1996 single by Donna Lewis, but JoJo had to remove the song from the EP after Donna Lewis threatened legal action. JoJo has since removed "Right On Time" along with a 'Tour Video' of the song due to Donna Lewis threatening legal action. As of January 2025, the entire EP is unavailable to stream on digital platforms for unknown reasons.

== Track listing ==
No.	Title	Producer(s)	Length
1.	"Right On Time"	Noisecastle III	3:56
2.	"Back2Life"	Soraya LaPread	3:10
3.	"When Love Hurts (Real Love Remix)"	JordanXL; Devin Cruise	4:38
4.	"Thinkin Out Loud"	Austin Brown	3:31
Total length:			15:15
