= Joe Jonas & Jay Sean: Live in Concert =

2011 concert tour by Joe Jonas and Jay Sean

- Co-headlining tour by Joe Jonas; Jay Sean
- Promotional poster for the tour
- Location: North America
- Start date: September 6, 2011
- End date: October 6, 2011
- Legs: 1
- No. of shows: 19 in North America
Joe Jonas tour chronology
Joe Jonas & Jay Sean: Live in Concert (2011)
Jay Sean tour chronology
2010 Tour (2010)	Joe Jonas & Jay Sean: Live in Concert (2011)	The Homecoming Tour (2011)

Joe Jonas & Jay Sean: Live in Concert was a co-headlining tour by American recording artist Joe Jonas and British recording artist Jay Sean. The tour played 19 concerts in North America in the fall of 2011.

== Background ==
The tour was announced in August 2011. In a press release announcing the tour, both artists expressed excitement at the concept of touring with the other. Jonas stated, "This is going to be a killer tour and who better to hit the road with than Jay Sean". Sean reiterated the sentiment, saying "I'm super excited to be on the road with Joe and I think it's going to be a great experience for me."

The tour was originally 18+, however, the restrictions were later lifted.

== Opening act ==
- JoJo

== Setlist ==
Joe Jonas
1. "Love Slayer"
2. "Fastlife"
3. "Just in Love"
4. "Sorry"
5. "When You Look Me in the Eyes" / "Hello Beautiful" / "Burnin' Up"
6. "All This Time"
7. "Kleptomaniac"
8. "Beautiful People"
9. "See No More"

== Tour dates ==
Date	City	Country	Venue
September 6, 2011	Boston	United States	House of Blues
September 7, 2011	Philadelphia	United States	Theatre of Living Arts
September 10, 2011	Toronto	Canada	Sound Academy
September 11, 2011	Cleveland	United States	House of Blues
September 12, 2011	Chicago	United States	House of Blues
September 15, 2011	Minneapolis	United States	First Avenue
September 17, 2011	Denver	United States	Fillmore Auditorium
September 19, 2011	San Francisco	United States	Regency Ballroom
September 20, 2011	West Hollywood	United States	House of Blues
September 21, 2011	Pomona	United States	Fox Theater
September 24, 2011	Scottsdale	United States	The Venue
September 26, 2011	Houston	United States	House of Blues
September 28, 2011	Austin	United States	Moody Theater
September 29, 2011	Dallas	United States	House of Blues
October 1, 2011	Clearwater	United States	Ruth Eckerd Hall
October 2, 2011	Lake Buena Vista	United States	House of Blues
October 3, 2011	Atlanta	United States	Tabernacle
October 5, 2011	Silver Spring	United States	The Fillmore Silver Spring
October 6, 2011	New York City	United States	Best Buy Theater

Cancellations and rescheduled shows

September 7, 2011	Upper Darby Township, Pennsylvania	Tower Theater	Moved to the Theatre of Living Arts in Philadelphia
September 19, 2011	San Francisco	Warfield Theatre	Moved to the Regency Ballroom
September 20, 2011	Los Angeles	Wiltern Theatre	Moved to the House of Blues in West Hollywood, California

=== Box office score data ===
Venue	City	Tickets sold / Available	Gross revenue
Regency Ballroom	San Francisco	728 / 1,424 (51%)	$21,544
Ruth Eckerd Hall	Clearwater	626 / 1,915 (33%)	$28,050
Best Buy Theater	New York City	2,150 / 2,150 (100%)	$72,413
TOTAL (for the 3 concerts listed)		3,504 / 5,489 (64%)	$122,007
