= Agápē (mixtape) =

Mixtape by JoJo
- Released: December 20, 2012
- Recorded: January–December 2012
- Length: 27:27
- Producers: Stephen "Thundercat" Bruner; The Backpackkids; Austin Brown; Scott Bruzenak; Mr. Franks; Boi-1da

JoJo chronology
Can't Take That Away from Me (2010)	Agápē (2012)	#LoveJo (2014)

Singles from Agápē
- 1. "We Get By" Released: November 15, 2012; 2. "André" Released: November 30, 2012

Agápē is the second mixtape by American singer JoJo. She announced it in early November 2012 and recorded material specifically intended for the mixtape as she did not want to keep her fans waiting for new music any longer. Released on her 22nd birthday on December 20, 2012, it marked the follow-up to her 2010 mixtape Can't Take That Away from Me, which spawned the single and video for "In the Dark".

The mixtape's first single "We Get By" was released for free online on November 15, 2012, on JoJo's official SoundCloud with a limited number of downloads, with JoJo stating that "there's a limit on the download because we want you to download the entire mixtape once it's released". She recorded the song with a group of her friends known as The Backpackkids who all got together to create what they call "genre-less music".

== Background ==
In late 2012 Interscope Records dropped Blackground Records from their distribution, resulting in JoJo's third album, then titled Jumping Trains, being unable to be released. JoJo has experienced ongoing issues with her label including a reluctance to release new music including the album's first single "Demonstrate", leading to the album's release being delayed many times. As a result, JoJo began recording new material to be used specifically for a new mixtape to be released by the end of 2012.

JoJo describes Agápē as a "labor of love from the heart without limits or boundaries." In an interview with VibeVixen when describing the tape JoJo said "I would say this is definitely the most cohesive body of work. It's more of an experience, there's more interludes," she says. "It'll kind of let you in on what's been happening in my personal life, my family. It really plays on me being from Massachusetts, me living in L.A. and finding myself in between those two worlds, not feeling like I necessarily belong anywhere, but I guess that's how most people feel in their 20s anyway."

== Recording and composition ==
On November 15, 2012, just two months before the mixtape's release, JoJo officially announced that she had been working on her second free mixtape that was scheduled to be released on her 22nd birthday on December 20, 2012, however recording for the mixtape had already begun as early as January 2012 as she "didn't wan't to keep the fans waiting for new music any longer". Due to ongoing issues with her label, Blackground Records, which have been reluctant to release any new music (including the single, "Demonstrate", which has led to the album's release to be delayed many times), JoJo began recording new material to be used specifically for a brand new mixtape.

Agápē was written and recorded over six days while Janet Jackson's Velvet Rope Tour played on a studio television for inspiration, with one song completed each day. While "Andre" and "Can't Handle the Truth" had already been recorded prior to the mixtape's production, as "Can't Handle the Truth" was originally recorded for JoJo's much delayed third album, she gained permission from the songs producer Boi-1da to release the track on the mixtape instead. The first track written for the tape was the mixtape's lead single "We Get By".

The mixtape is predominantly R&B/pop; however, JoJo describes the mixtape's sound as genre-less. On the first track of the tape "Back2thebeginningagain" JoJo talks about her constant record label struggles and how she finally feels okay to record the type of music she has always wanted to. JoJo states "It's about driving around Foxborough in my mom's Toyota Echo with the dents on the side of it and just getting in touch with my roots: Who I am; where I came from. I'm talking about some of those dark times where I've drank until I've gone to sleep and woken up and feeling like 'ok, everything else is in the past. Today I start forward and start fresh.'" The mixtape's second track "We Get By" is mainly of an old school R&B/pop genre. It is written by JoJo who expresses remaining optimistic in spite of the obstacles she faces. "I know it will be OK. I believe in myself" she sings, referring to her constant label troubles. JoJo states "It's kind of about me moving from South Boston to Los Angeles and my decision to do that. Feeling like I needed a place to explore and grow." She goes on further in another interview stating "It's the mission statement for what we were going to expand upon, and I was touching on the feeling like you don't belong anywhere but you still feel like you're going to be okay no matter where you're at." The third track on the tape "Take the Canyon" is influenced by an old relationship. JoJo says "'Take the Canyon' is about cheating, and it's about only having a window of time to be with that lover and needing to get there as soon as possible for this illicit rendezvous. It's about taking the canyon–Beverly Glen or Laurel Canyon or whatever it may be." The fourth track is titled "Billions" and was originally written about an old lover. JoJo states "it became about my family. As much as I can see in the world, there's nothing more important to me than that foundation of family, friendship and real love."

The fifth track "Thinking Out Loud" "Is about hooking up with an ex. And it's about how your heart hasn't really mended from the way that things ended. You realize that it hurts even more, even though you guys don't have a title; it hurts even more being with that person knowing that they don't feel the way that you do." The sixth track on the mixtape is a cover of Joni Mitchell's "Free Man in Paris" which, serving as a tribute to Mitchell, was renamed "White Girl in Paris". The mixtape's seventh track and second single from the tape "Andre" was also written by JoJo while production was handled by Mr. Franks. In discussion of the track, JoJo says "Andre" isn't necessarily a direct tribute to Outkast's André 3000; rather, the 37-year-old rapper/singer provided inspiration for the song. "I absolutely admire André and both of the guys from Outkast — their incredible artistry and creativity," she explains. "The man that André is, I think that's super-sexy — someone who is themselves, who isn't confined and just expresses themselves. He has such a great style. I was inspired by that, for sure." The mixtape includes music from Dropkick Murphys' "I'm Shipping Up to Boston" on the "St. Patrick's Day Interlude".

The final track, "Can't Handle the Truth", was written by JoJo while production was handled by Boi-1da. Originally, the song was recorded for her third album but was used on the mixtape instead. When describing the song JoJo states "It's about cheating and basically blaming it on the guy. Saying like 'You are responsible for my infidelity because you made me this way and you can't handle it because you're such a fucking idiot.'"

Agápē is JoJo's first official release to contain explicit lyrics. There are a few tracks on the tape that refer to drug use and sex as heard on "We Get By" and "Billions", respectively. "Take the Canyon" contains the lyrics "I'm always coming over and smoking you out because everything is better with a blunt in your mouth". When asked about the drug references during an interview with TheYoungFolks.com, JoJo states

"I knew that it was just going to be an opportunity to present myself in a way that was true to what some kids my age are doing, experiencing and thinking about. I just wanted to paint a true picture... and I think that there are still some things that women aren't "suppose [sic] to say," you know what I mean? So, it's kind of jarring to hear that. I was more concerned about being respected as a good woman but still expressing myself like the Bostonian I am."

== Promotion ==
In promotion for the tape JoJo performed songs for the first time at the Roxy in Los Angeles such as "Andre" and "We Get By". During the release week of the tape JoJo did a four song acoustic set list on the Splash at ThatGrapeJuice.com, where fans got to choose which songs they wished to see her perform including "Too Little Too Late", "André", "Demonstrate" and "The Christmas Song". JoJo performed a mini-concert from her keyboardist’s living room and broadcast it live online via Stageit.com where fans were able to purchase tickets and stream her entire performance online where she performed several tracks from the tape including "Andre", "We Get By", the full extended version of "Thinking Out Loud" and "Billions". She has since performed tracks from the tape at several live performances and interviews including a benefit concert titled "Love is Heroic" where she performed the full version of "Thinking Out Loud". she also performed the song during an interview with YoungHollywood.com.

JoJo did a four song acoustic set list on the "Rap-UpTV Sessions" through Rap-Up.com where she performed "Andre", "Demonstrate", "Marvin's Room" and "Like That", a cut from her 2006 sophomore album The High Road. Due to popular demand JoJo is set to release the full extended version of "Thinking Out Loud". JoJo's reasons for not releasing the whole song on the mixtape is because she gets very self-conscious of her work, and wasn't sure whether she was going to release it or not. JoJo also scheduled several music video for songs from the mixtape including "Andre", "Thinking Out Loud" and "Can't Handle the Truth".

=== Tour ===
In support of the mixtape JoJo embarked on a nationwide tour hitting the East Coast and other cities in the United States as well as Canada. She met with her agency in January 2013 to sort out a specific route for the tour. On August 28, 2013, JoJo announced the first five tour dates entitled "The Agápē Tour" via her official Twitter page with special guest Leah Labelle as the opening act.

== Singles ==
"We Get By" was released as the lead single from the mixtape and premiered online on November 15, 2012. the song was written by JoJo, Austin Brown, Scott Bruzenak, and Tommy Parker, while production was handled by the Backpackkids. JoJo has described the song as "genre-less music". When describing the song, JoJo claimed "It's kind of about me moving from South Boston to Los Angeles and my decision to do that. Feeling like I needed a place to explore and grow."

"André" was released as the second single and premiered online on November 30, 2012. The song was written by JoJo and production was handled by Mr. Franks. The song was inspired by the OutKast rapper’s 2003 album The Love Below. The song gained some airplay like her previous single "Demonstrate" despite not being serviced to radio. The music video for "Andre" was directed by Patrick "Embryo" Tapu, while the treatment for the video was handled by Blackwell Cooper and produced by Samuel Sanchez. Filming for the video began on January 27, 2013, in Downtown Los Angeles and took fourteen hours for shooting to complete. In a behind-the-scenes photo taken on the set we see JoJo wearing hipster chic looks designed by Joy Rich Clothing as she performs on a rooftop overlooking the city and in front of artwork at The Hive gallery. The music video for "Andre" made its official worldwide premiere on March 21, 2013, exclusively through Complex magazine. The video follows JoJo as she wakes up in her boyfriend's downtown loft and visits him at his job at an art gallery where his identity is a mystery until the end when his actions reveal how he feels towards her as he praises her in a special art exhibit at the gallery. The video includes cameos from her girlfriends including Leah LaBelle, Karina Pasian, Francia Raisa, Leven Rambin, Denise Janae and her guitarist JinJoo Lee. Agápē is show in both the video and on-screen at the end with the words below reading "Rescue is the Best Breed ADOPT".

"Thinking Out Loud" was released intended as the mixtape's third single, including the full extended version of the song (as Agápē only includes a snippet of the song) and premiered in May 2013. The song was written by JoJo, Austin Brown, and Scott Bruzenak who also handled the song's production. Due to popular demand for the extended version of the song JoJo decided to choose "Thinking Out Loud" as the mixtape's third single. The accompanying music video for "Thinking Out Loud" was directed by Aaron A. Filming for the video began on March 29, 2013, in downtown Los Angeles. The music video has yet to be released.

== Concept, title and artwork ==
JoJo didn't want to keep her fans waiting for new music due to ongoing label issues; thus, she began recording material specifically for the mixtape. Originally JoJo thought of naming the mixtape Live Free or Die after the New Hampshire state motto (which inspired the tattoo on the back of her neck), but upon further thought, JoJo stated "it sounded dramatic and militant and scary. And that is SO not what this is all about! Its really about friends coming together and bonding over a mutual love for music then seeing what grows out of it. Not about industry politics, agendas, empty-promises, ego, swag, pretension, or a budget of any kind."

The mixtape's title "agape" means "unconditional love" in Greek. The cover is a picture of her recently adopted mixed-breed dog of the same name with the Westwood skyline in the background. JoJo describes agape as "unconditional love without pretense, regardless of circumstance." The title was also inspired by an 11‑year-old concert violinist whose name was also Agape, JoJo states "I remember meeting a girl, this incredible concert violinist — she was like 11 years old and her name was Agápe. I'll never forget her. So [that incident] inspired this."

When describing the mixtape JoJo says "This mixtape is meant to be experienced when you have 27-28 minutes to go on a little journey with me and listen to some stories. There are interludes, outerludes, random shit, my dad playing harmonica, and a conversation between my whole family at Thanksgiving." Agápē has been described as a "labor of love from the heart without limits or boundaries."

== Track listing ==
No.	Title	Writer(s)	Producer(s)	Length
1.	"Back2thebeginningagain"	Joanna Levesque, Jahi Sundance	State of Emergency, Thundercat	1:29
2.	"We Get By"	Levesque, Austin Brown, Tommy Parker, Scott Bruzenak	The Backpackkids	4:00
3.	"Interlude Un"			0:14
4.	"Take the Canyon"	Levesque, Brown, Bruzenak	Austin Brown, Scott Bruzenak	4:13
5.	"Billions"	Levesque, Brown, Bruzenak, Kelly Parker, Pavel Gitnik	Scott Bruzenak	3:57
6.	"Interlude Deux: Joel's Jam"	Joel Levesque		0:29
7.	"Thinking Out Loud"	Levesque, Brown, Bruzenak	Scott Bruzenak	1:07
8.	"Interlude Trois: Love This Shit"			0:23
9.	"White Girl in Paris"	Joni Mitchell	Scott Bruzenak	2:58
10.	"LTS Reprise"			0:24
11.	"Andre"	Levesque	Mr. Franks,	3:59
12.	"St. Patrick's Day Interlude"			0:58
13.	"Can't Handle the Truth"	Levesque, Elijah Blake	Boi-1da	3:24
Total length:				27:27
