= Demonstrate (song) =

Promotional single by JoJo
- Released: July 17, 2012
- Recorded: 2012
- Genre: R&B
- Length: 3:30
- Label: Blackground; Interscope
- Songwriters: Daniel Daley; Anthony Jeffries; Joanna Levesque; Noah Shebib
- Producer: 40

Audio video
- "Demonstrate" on YouTube

"Demonstrate (2018)"

Single by JoJo
- Released: December 21, 2018
- Recorded: 2018
- Length: 3:15
- Label: Clover Music; Warner Bros.
- Songwriters: Daniel Daley; Anthony Jeffries; Joanna Levesque; Noah Shebib
- Producer: Klynik

JoJo singles chronology
"Disaster (2018)" (2018)	"Demonstrate (2018)" (2018)	"Say So" (2019)

Audio video
- "Demonstrate (2018)" on YouTube

"Demonstrate" is a song recorded by American recording artist JoJo, originally planned to be the lead single from her third studio album. It was written by JoJo, Daniel Daley, Anthony Jeffries and Noah "40" Shebib, the latter of whom also handled the song's production.

The song's development was conceived after JoJo released a cover version of the song "Marvins Room" by Drake, which was also produced by Shebib. Following critical acclaim, JoJo organised recording sessions with the producer to find a new more confident sound for her much-delayed third album. JoJo went on to announce that the R&B song was to serve as the album's lead single, replacing "Disaster", which was released almost a year prior.

"Demonstrate" made its world premiere online and on July 17, 2012. It was scheduled for release to digital outlets on August 28, 2012 but its commercial release was eventually scrapped. "Demonstrate" received favorable reviews from critics who generally praised the maturity of the song; some noted its similarities to Kelly Rowland's 2011 single "Motivation". On December 21, 2018, JoJo released a re-recorded version of the song as a standalone single from her label Clover Music.

== Background ==
JoJo's third studio release, which was announced in 2007, was originally slated to be titled "All I Want Is Everything"; this was announced to have been retitled to "Jumping Trains" in 2011. The album was delayed multiple times due to difficulties with her record labels. Initially, the pop rock-influenced "Disaster" served as the album's lead single in the United States. However, JoJo later decided to move into a different direction musically, and announced that instead, "'Demonstrate'" would serve as the album's lead single.

"Demonstrate" made its world premiere online and on US radio on July 17, 2012, and was scheduled for worldwide release to digital outlets on August 28, 2012. However, its digital and radio releases were eventually scrapped due to continuous issues with her record label Blackground Records.

On December 20, 2018, JoJo surprised fans with the re-release of Demonstrate along with her self-titled debut album, sophomore album The High Road and single Disaster, released under JoJo's new label imprint Clover Music on December 21. The decision to re-record the singles and albums came from the unavailability of all of JoJo's original music released under Blackground Records from all streaming and digital selling platforms.

== Music and lyrics ==
"Demonstrate" was written by JoJo, Daniel Daley, Anthony Jeffries and Noah "40" Shebib who also produced the track. "Demonstrate" is a R&B song with a length of 3 minutes and 30 seconds (3:30). The lyrics center around JoJo explaining that she'd prefer to express herself through actions rather than words, and are accompanied by a "synth-saturated beat". Music critics noted its similarities to Kelly Rowland's Motivation.

JoJo stated the single was recorded and inspired after the praise she got after she released her own version of Drake's "Marvins Room" (Take Care, 2011), titled "Can't Do Better". JoJo said that she was "a little apprehensive" of releasing the track due to its sexually explicit content, but also noted: "When people responded so well to my version of 'Marvin's Room' I think that it was reassuring to me of the direction I wanted to go in". When speaking about working with Canadian producer Noah "40" Shebib, she said: "It was my dream, I really wanted to get in with him; he's the most exciting producer I've ever worked with."

== Critical response ==
"Demonstrate" received generally positive reviews from music critics, who noted its similarities to Kelly Rowland's 2011 single "Motivation" (Here I Am, 2011). Becky Bain from Idolator reviewed JoJo's song, claiming "This sounds exactly like a song someone like Kelly Rowland might release, and surprisingly, JoJo totally pulls it off. Bain also stated, "While every other hot young thing is hopping on trend and releasing electro-dubstep-techno-kichen-sink club-stompers in order to get noticed, we appreciate JoJo keeping things slow and sexy". Scott Shetler of PopCrush reviewed the song and gave it a rating of four out of five stars, writing "JoJo comfortably moves in and out of falsetto, sounding as sexy and confident as Mariah Carey ever has" Adelle Platon of Vibe Vixen called the song a "grown and sexy bedroom heater". Katharine St. Asaph of Popdust rated the song four out of five stars, noting JoJo's "Equally unsurprisingly, technically adept, switching between melisma and near-whispers, alto and head voice, with mere seconds between". Laura Sassano of OK! called the song "a definitely more sensual feel than her previous hits" and praised her "killer set of pipes". Jayvee from The Round Table stated that "Demonstrate" reminds him a lot of that "slinky, R&B vibe from "Are You That Somebody" which was made famous by R&B singer Aaliyah.

Christina Garibaldi of MTV praised the song of it maturity, stating: "The sexy, sultry R&B single shows maturity not only in its lyrical nature, but in JoJo's development as an artist." Rich Juzwiak from Gawker said "I have mostly ignored this girl, figuring she couldn't possibly have ditched the cheese of her teeny-bopping youth. I can ignore her no longer". Rick Jeffries from Stupiddope.com praised JoJo's "sweet voice" and "heartfelt lyrics". Amanda Dobbins from Vulture called the song "a spacy, kind of strange sex jam". Marcel Salas from Global Grind applauded JoJo's "angelic and soulful riffs" throughout the song, while Renee Brown from Examiner.com said "Demonstrate" "certainly shows a mature, sexually advance JoJo on this track". Bradley Stern from MuuMuse.com said the song had a similar style to JoJo's song "In The Dark" from her 2010 mixtape "Can't Take That Away from Me", while comparing it to artists like Prince & Beyoncé." Zara Golden from VH1 praised her for capably moving from "a near-whisper to an almost whistle-register and back without overwhelming the patently patient and self-conscious beat."

== Music video ==
The official music video for "Demonstrate" was directed by Jason Beattie. The video was shot on August 13, 2012 inside a mansion in Beverly Hills. When speaking concept of the video, JoJo stated: "This is kind of my own personal twisted fantasy, where the colors are more vivid, everything is more sensual, sexy and kind of a little wild". In certain scenes in the video JoJo can be seen swinging on a giant chandelier. The video was never officially released, and JoJo stated a few months after the video was filmed that it was unlikely to be released, explaining: "I have no idea what [Blackground Records] plans to do with that video; I’m not in control of that. [...] I’m pretty sure they owe some people some money on that actually."

== Track listings ==
Streaming
No.	Title	Writer(s)	Producer(s)	Length
1.	"Demonstrate"	Daniel Daley; Anthony Jeffries; Joanna Levesque; Noah Shebib	40	3:30
Total length:				3:30

2018 Re-issue
No.	Title	Writer(s)	Producer(s)	Length
1.	"Demonstrate (2018)"	Daley; Jeffries; Levesque; Shebib	Klynik	3:15
Total length:				3:15

== Credits and personnel ==
Credits were adapted from Spotify.

- JoJo – vocals, songwriting, background vocals
- Noah Shebib – production, songwriting
- Klynik - production (2018 re-issue)
- Ryan Gladieux – record engineering, mixing
- Daniel Daley – songwriting
- Anthony Jeffries – songwriting

== Release history ==
Region	Date	Format	Version	Label	Ref.
United States	July 17, 2012	Streaming	Original	Blackground; Interscope	
Various	December 21, 2018	Digital download; streaming	2018 reissue	Clover Music; Warner Bros.	
