= When Love Hurts =

- Remix single cover

Single by JoJo

from the album III.
- Released: November 17, 2015
- Recorded: 2015
- Genre: Electropop; dance
- Length: 3:35
- Label: Atlantic
- Songwriters: Ammar Malik; Benjamin Levin; Jason Evigan; Daniel Omelio; Aryn Wüthrich
- Producers: Benny Blanco; Jason Evigan

JoJo singles chronology
"Disaster" (2011)	"When Love Hurts" (2015)	"Fuck Apologies" (2016)

Music video
- "When Love Hurts" on YouTube

"When Love Hurts" is a song recorded by American singer JoJo that was intended for her third studio album, Mad Love (2016), (though didn't actually end up on it) and is included on her "tringle" (triple single) extended play (EP), III. (2015). The song was written by Ammar Malik, Benny Blanco, Daniel Omelio, Jason Evigan, creative team "The XX" and Ryn Weaver, while Blanco and Evigan also handled the production. "When Love Hurts" was the first song from the tringle to be promoted to radio via Atlantic Records. An official remix package was released on October 2, 2015. The song officially impacted Mainstream radio in the U.S. on November 17, 2015.

== Composition ==
"When Love Hurts" is an uptempo house and dance song with a duration of three minutes and thiry-five seconds (3:35). It is instrumented by piano and synthesizers and features layered vocals. Lyrically, the song is about being moved by a strong emotion and fighting for things we love, even when it hurts.

== Critical reception ==
Billboard praised "When Love Hurts" as the "most vivacious" song on the EP and declared it a "banger worth a thousand disco balls." Carolyn Menyes of MusicTimes gave a more mixed review, writing that the song was "the least stunning of the three," but that it was the most mainstream-friendly and succeeds at making the listener dance.

== Commercial performance ==
"When Love Hurts" has not entered the Billboard Hot 100 but has charted on the Hot Singles Sales component chart and also the Pop Digital Songs sales chart as well as the Hot Dance Club Songs chart.

== Music video ==
The music video for "When Love Hurts" was shot on September 1 and was directed by Patrick "Embryo" Tapu. It premiered September 28, 2015 through MTV. The video features JoJo and various backup dancers performing the vogue and a "finger tutting" dance in an abandoned warehouse.

== Track listing ==
Remixes EP

1. "When Love Hurts (Full Crate Remix)" – 3:36
2. "When Love Hurts (Chris Cox Remix)" – 6:36
3. "When Love Hurts (Sweater Beats Remix)" – 3:40
4. "When Love Hurts (Hugel Remix)" – 4:04
5. "When Love Hurts (Etienne Ozborne Remix)" – 5:07
6. "When Love Hurts (Laszlo Remix)" – 5:41

== Charts ==
Chart (2015–2016)	Peak position
US Hot Singles Sales (Billboard)	7
US Pop Digital Songs (Billboard)	27
US Dance Club Songs (Billboard)	3

== Release history ==
Region	Date	Format	Label	Ref.
Worldwide	August 21, 2015	Digital download	Atlantic	
Worldwide	October 2, 2015	Digital download (Remixes EP)	Atlantic	
United States	November 17, 2015	Mainstream radio	300; Atlantic; RRP	
