= Can't Take That Away from Me =

Mixtape by JoJo
- Released: September 7, 2010
- Recorded: 2008–2010
- Length: 38:06
- Producers: Beau Dozier; Theron "Neff-U" Feemster; Jordan Gatsby; Chad Hugo; Kenna; The Messengers; Jeremiah McConico; Oak; State of Emergency

JoJo chronology
The High Road (2006)	Can't Take That Away from Me (2010)	Agápē (2012)

Singles from Can't Take That Away from Me
- 1. "In the Dark" Released: August 30, 2010

Can't Take that Away from Me is the first mixtape by American singer JoJo. It was self-released by the singer for free download exclusively through Rap-Up on September 7, 2010. The mixtape was to serve as a prequel to her third studio album, which at the time was titled All I Want Is Everything.

JoJo wrote or co-wrote all but one of the mixtape's 11 tracks, which she worked on with a variety of producers, including Beau Dozier, Theron "Neff-U" Feemster, Chad Hugo, Kenna, the Messengers, Oak, and among others. The mixtape was not made commercially available; it is not available on streaming services. Since its release on Rap-Up, the mixtape has been downloaded over 400,000 times.

== Background ==
Following the release of The High Road, JoJo stated that she had been writing and working with producers for her third studio album, but would not go into the studio until early 2008. In mid-2008, JoJo revealed that the album, titled All I Want Is Everything, was scheduled for a fourth quarter release that year, to coincide with her eighteenth birthday in December. However, the album's release was delayed due to issues with her record labels, Blackground and its imprint Da Family Entertainment, which had encountered financial difficulties. Eventually, JoJo decided to sue the labels to be released from her contract. However, in October 2009, JoJo reached a deal with Blackground Records, who had reached a deal with Interscope Records for distribution. The mixtape served as a "re-entry to the music industry".

== Recording and composition ==
In late 2009, JoJo stated that she would be working on her first mixtape with producers Clinton Sparks and Chester French. The mixtape's recording took place over one year. JoJo thought that it was more experimental than her album because she "was able to explore the full spectrum of things that interest me and inspire me musically", which resulted in a broad range of sounds, such as pop, hip-hop and soulful records. Compared to an album release, the mixtape allowed JoJo to be "more soulful, incorporate live instruments, and say things that I wouldn't normally say on an album. I was just able to take more of a risk." The mixtape's black-and-white cover was designed by Mowie Inc., and photographed by Steven Taylor.

The mixtape's title, Can't Take That Away from Me, was personal to JoJo because it reflected what she was going through "professionally as well as personally. Starting with the fact that I want to release music and you can't really take what comes naturally to me, away from me." Upon the mixtape's release, JoJo said that "in releasing this mixtape, I'm affirming that even though some have tried they CAN'T TAKE THAT AWAY FROM ME. What is THAT? My voice, my spirit, my drive, my dreams. As you listen to these songs, I hope that they make your head nod, your mind tick, your emotions move, your belly laugh, and maybe elicit a 'stanky face' or something."

== Promotion ==
The track "In the Dark" premiered on August 30, 2010, on Rap-Up.com. Produced by Jordan Gatsby and co-written by JoJo and Gatsby, the singer thought that the song was unlike anything that she had previously released because "it's a very sensual record and there's an undertone of sadness to it." The track's "experimental sound" was not meant to reflect the material on All I Want Is Everything, but was released as "a thank you to her loyal fans who've stuck by her throughout the years". The song's viral video was released on September 8. Filmed in January 2010 and directed by Nicole Ehrlich and Clarence Fuller in New York, the scenes were originally shot in color, but it was later decided that black-and-white imagery would best convey the lyrics and mood. Rap-Up wrote that "JoJo sheds her good girl image for a more risqué one in the viral video" as "the blindfolded singer gives into her physical desires in the provocative clip."

=== Live performances ===
JoJo performed the song "Boy Without a Heart" several times since the release of the mixtape. She performed the song for the first time at 4th annual Jordin Sparks experience in North Texas on February 2, 2011. She then performed the song at the Girls Who Rock 2011 Concert benefiting She's the First where she also debut her the song "Jumping Trains" from her upcoming third album of the same name. She has also performed the song on the Joe Jonas & Jay Sean Tour as their opening act and has performed it a few other times.

== Track listing ==
Writing and production credits adapted from Bandcamp.

No.	Title	Writer(s)	Producer(s)	Length
1.	"Can't Take That Away from Me"	Joanna "JoJo" Levesque; Mischke	Theron "Neff-U" Feemster	3:02
2.	"Running on Empty"	Levesque; Mischke	Feemster	3:15
3.	"Pretty Please"	Levesque; Jim Beanz; Kenna	Chad Hugo; Kenna	3:21
4.	"Why Didn't You Call"	Levesque	State of Emergency	3:28
5.	"Just a Dream"	Levesque	Jeremiah McConico	3:31
6.	"When Does It Go Away" (featuring Travis Garland)	Garland; Beau Dozier	Dozier	4:16
7.	"My Time Is Money"	Levesque; Nasri Atweh; Luke James	Oak	2:43
8.	"What You Like" (featuring Jordan Gatsby)	Levesque; Gatsby	Gatsby	3:39
9.	"In the Dark"	Levesque	Gatsby	3:32
10.	"Boy Without a Heart"	Levesque; Atweh	The Messengers	4:15
11.	"All I Want Is Everything"	Levesque	Gatsby	3:04
Total length:				38:06
