= The High Road (JoJo album) =

2006 studio album by JoJo

Studio album by JoJo
- Released: October 17, 2006
- Recorded: 2005–2006
- Studios: The Hit Factory Criteria (Miami) (Note: Track 1); Sony (New York City) (Note: Tracks 1, 3, 5, 6 and 10); Monza (New York City) (Note: Track 2); Cryptic (Los Angeles) (Note: Tracks 3 and 11); Glenwood (Burbank, California) (Note: Track 4); Chaos Theory (Encino, California) (Note: Track 5); Sound Moves (Sun Valley, California); The Apartment (New York City) (Note: Track 6); Soulpower (Los Angeles) (Note: Tracks 7 and 8); Glen Oak (Los Angeles) (Note: Track 8); Battery (New York City) (Note: Track 9); Chalice (Los Angeles) (Note: Vocals on track 9); Realsongs (West Hollywood, California) (Note: Track 10); Noisy Neighbor (Los Angeles) (Note: Track 12)
- Genres: Pop; teen pop; R&B
- Length: 44:27
- Labels: Da Family; Blackground; Universal Motown
- Producers: Josh Alexander; Beau Dozier; Focus...; Matthew Gerrard; Emile Ghantous; Vincent Herbert; Ryan Leslie; Erik Nelson; Jonathan "J.R." Rotem; Soulshock and Karlin; Stargate; Billy Steinberg; Peter Stengaard; Scott Storch; Swizz Beatz; Justin Trugman

JoJo chronology
JoJo (2004)	The High Road (2006)	Can't Take That Away from Me (2010)

Singles from The High Road
- 1. "Too Little Too Late" Released: July 24, 2006; 2. "How to Touch a Girl" Released: November 14, 2006; 3. "Anything" Released: March 20, 2007

The High Road is the second studio album by American singer JoJo. Its recording sessions took place between late 2005 and mid-2006 in California, New York City, Miami, and Atlanta, following her completion of filming Aquamarine and RV. While recording the album, JoJo worked with producers Scott Storch, Sean Garrett, Swizz Beatz, Josh Alexander, Billy Steinberg, Vincent Herbert, J.R. Rotem, Beau Dozier, Ryan Leslie, and among others. Releasing it on October 17, 2006, through Da Family Entertainment, Blackground, and Universal Records, JoJo co-wrote two out of the seventeen tracks from the album.

The High Road was preceded by the lead single "Too Little Too Late" which became JoJo's best-performing single on the US Billboard Hot 100. It broke the record for the biggest jump into the top three on the chart, moving from number 66 to number three in one week. The song also reached the top ten in Australia, Ireland, New Zealand, and the UK. The second single, "How to Touch a Girl", was released on November 14, 2006. It failed to impact charts in the US. "Anything" was released as the album's third and final single on March 20, 2007, reaching number 18 in Ireland and number 21 in the UK.

Upon its release, The High Road received generally favorable reviews from music critics, many noting that the album showed more confidence while slower tracks helped showcase JoJo's "superb vocal abilities". It debuted at number three on the US Billboard 200 with 108,000 copies sold in its first week, while also peaking at number 12 on the Canadian Albums Chart and number 24 on the UK Albums Chart. The album received gold certifications in the United States, Canada, and the United Kingdom; as of December 2018, it had sold three million copies worldwide.

Citing the album's unavailability on streaming services, JoJo released a re-recorded version of The High Road on December 21, 2018. On September 24, 2021, Blackground Records released the original version of The High Road to streaming services and digital platforms. On October 23, 2026, JoJo announced that Seeker Music had acquired the album's original and 2018 re-recorded versions, with the latter renamed the Clover Room Edition. The announcement coincided with the release of a 20th-anniversary edition.

== Background ==
After the success of her debut album, JoJo quickly went back in the studio to work on new tracks. While recording, she worked with producers such as Josh Alexander, Beau Dozier, Ryan Leslie, J.R. Rotem, Matthew Gerrard, Soulshock & Karlin, Stargate, Billy Steinberg, Peter Stengaard, Scott Storch, Swizz Beatz, Justin Trugman, and Focus... It was reported that over 30 songs were written and recorded for the album, before being narrowed down to the twelve that made the final track listing. During an interview, JoJo compared The High Road to her previous album by stating, "I recorded my first album when I was 12, and now I'm 15. From age 12 to age 15 is a big jump in a young girl's life. I think with the new album, you can hear the maturity and confidence in my vocals. I'm coming into myself and being more comfortable. All of the songs on the album came out well - the music style is mostly urban like the my first album, but there are some rock elements too."

When asked about the recording process, JoJo stated, "I had finished promoting my first album, then I went to Australia to film Aquamarine", she recalled. "It was a busy time – while I was in Australia, I auditioned via satellite for RV. When I finished with Aquamarine, I came home and started working on the new album. It was mainly recorded in New York, Miami and L.A. We recorded over 30 songs with a lot of different people. [...] I feel that doing 30 songs was fine for the album. Some people would say that's too many to do, and it's costly to record that many songs. But Chris Brown recorded 50 songs for his album, and then he whittled it down and made a great record. When you record a lot of songs, you come up with different styles and ideas." On the album, JoJo got to work with Diane Warren, whom she had idolised. She recalled the process by saying, "I was very excited to get together with Diane Warren," she said. "I love Diane – she's one of my favorite people. We recorded four or five songs together, two of which made the album, 'Exceptional' and 'Note to God.' She's so cool."

== Composition ==
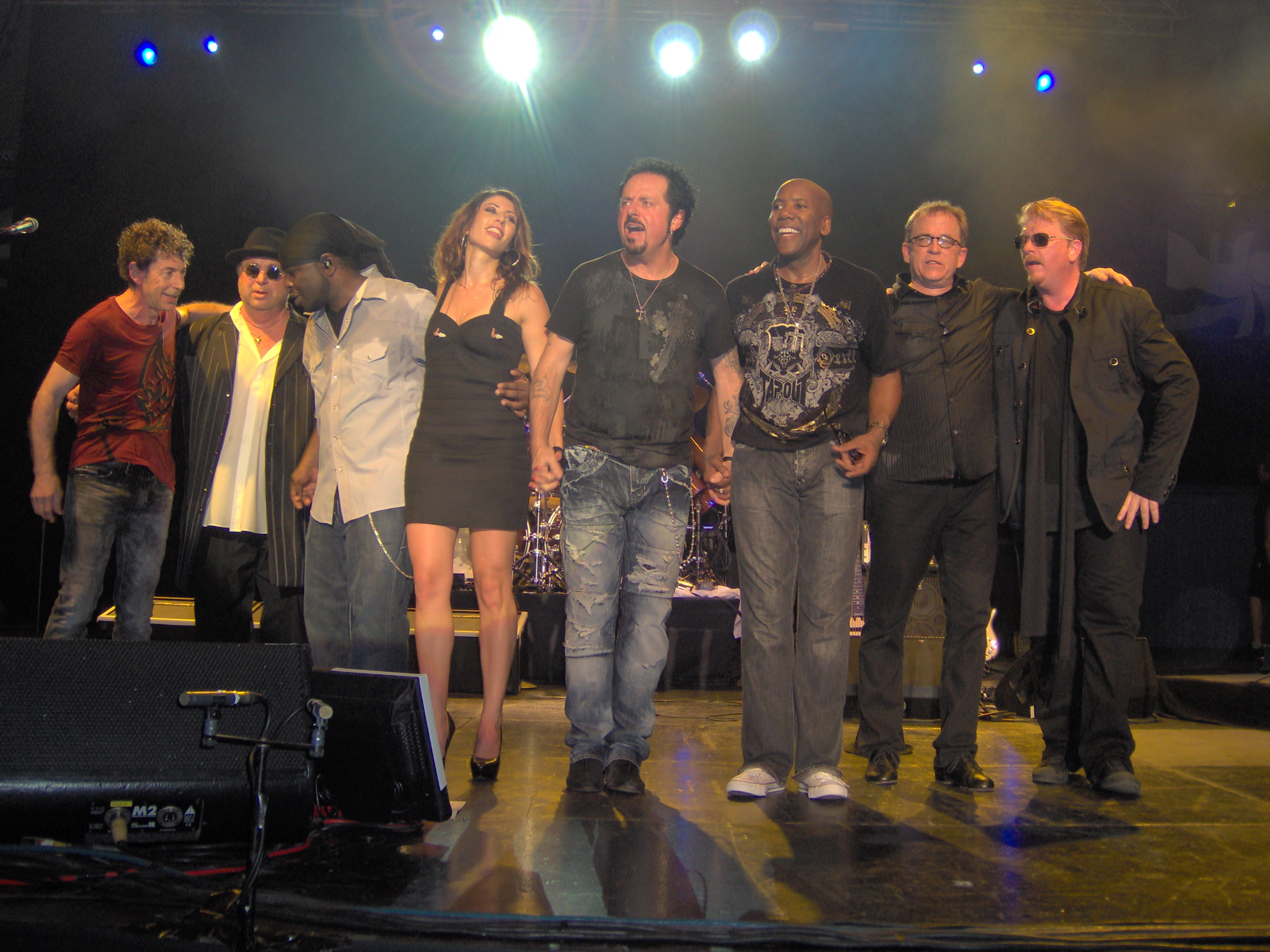
"Anything" contains a sample of Toto's 1982 song "Africa" written by drummer Jeff Porcaro and keyboardist David Paich. Due to the heavy interpolation of the song, Porcaro and Paich received co-writing credits.

The High Road contains a mixture of styles, ranging from R&B to pop. During an interview, JoJo stated, "I definitely felt more confident recording this album because I know how to go into the studio and how to work with producers. When you go into the studio you have to have a relationship with the producer while recording. Also, this time I knew how to warm up my vocals and what to expect." When asked about how the type of music she wanted on the album, she stated, "Well my executive Producer is Vincent Herbert [...] and he is very good at picking songs he thinks I'd like. He does like to throw curveballs sometimes and try different things. But most of the time we have the same taste."

== Release and promotion ==
On September 20, 2006, fans were able to buy from the iTunes Store snippets of three of JoJo's songs from the album, including "The Way You Do Me", "Let It Rain" and "This Time". The three promotional singles were released to raise hype for the album, after the success of the lead single. On September 27, JoJo performed "Too Little Too Late" and "This Time" on MTV's TRL. On September 28, AOL released Sessions@AOL, an exclusive performance from JoJo. During the performance, she performed the singles "Too Little Too Late" and "How to Touch a Girl", as well as two of JoJo's personal favorites, "This Time" and "The Way You Do Me", which had both been released as promotional singles before the album's release.

Though there has not been an official tour, she has been performing with a live band as part of the Six Flags Starburst Thursday Night Concert series during the summer of 2007. During some of these shows she has included medleys of her favorite popular songs from Beyoncé ("Déjà Vu"), Kelly Clarkson ("Since U Been Gone"), SWV, Gnarls Barkley, Jackson 5, Justin Timberlake ("My Love"), Maroon 5 ("Makes Me Wonder"), Usher, Carlos Santana, Jill Scott, Michael Jackson, George Benson, Musiq Soulchild, and Amy Winehouse ("Rehab", replacing the title with "Boston"). In November 2007, JoJo she toured in Brasil at the Live Pop Rock Brasil.

=== Singles ===
"Too Little Too Late" was released on July 24, 2006, as the lead single from The High Road. It broke the record for the biggest jump into the top three on the US Billboard Hot 100, moving from number 66 to number three in one week. In the United Kingdom, the single entered the UK Singles Chart at number 22 based on downloads alone two weeks before its physical CD release. (Note: It is because from 2007, the United Kingdom changed charting rules and downloaded singles can enter the UK Singles Chart at any time.) When "Too Little Too Late" was released to physical CD, it went up the chart to number four, its peak position. It had spent six weeks in the top ten and eleven weeks in the top 40. On September 20, 2006, three promotional singles were released to iTunes Store to help promote the release of the album: "This Time", "The Way You Do Me", and "Let It Rain". They had been performed live at several venues.

The second single, "How to Touch a Girl", was released on November 14, 2006, receiving critical reception from music critics. However, the song failed to have any chart success; it failed to chart on the US Billboard Hot 100, reaching number four on the US Bubbling Under Hot 100. "Anything" was released as the album's third and final single on March 20, 2007. (Note: It marks The High Road's second single in European countries, released in the United Kingdom on May 7, 2007.) It began gaining airplay in the United Kingdom on March 24, 2007, eventually debuting on BBC Radio 1's playlist under the B-list section. JoJo was in the United Kingdom during the first two weeks of May to promote the single; she performed at London's G-A-Y on May 12, and appeared on GMTV on May 8 as part of a series of radio and television interviews. "Anything" remained in the top 40 of the UK Singles Chart for three weeks.

== Critical reception ==
Professional ratings
Review scores
Source	Rating
About.com	4/5 stars
AllMusic	4/5 stars
Entertainment Weekly	B
The Guardian	4/5 stars
PopMatters	2/10
Prefix	6.5/10
Rolling Stone	2.5/5 stars
USA Today	3/4 stars

The album received generally positive reviews from music critics. Alex Macpherson of The Guardian awarded The High Road four out of five stars, praising JoJo's vocal performances and the balance between contemporary R&B, pop production, and emotional ballads. He highlighted "The Way You Do Me" and "Too Little Too Late" as standout tracks, with the latter serving as the album's emotional centerpiece. Matt Collar of AllMusic also gave the album four out of five stars, describing it as a collection of catchy pop songs that effectively showcased JoJo's vocal abilities. He praised her increased maturity and highlighted tracks such as "This Time," "The Way You Do Me," "Like That," "Anything," and "Good Ol'" for their melodies and stylistic variety, while noting that the album remained within mainstream pop conventions. Leah Greenblatt of Entertainment Weekly gave the album a B grade, praising JoJo as more than a typical teen-pop artist and highlighting her vocal range and polished songwriting. She described The High Road as a refined and understated pop album, with "Too Little Too Late" standing out as a highlight. Elysa Gardner of USA Today similarly praised JoJo's growth as a performer, crediting the album's strong hooks and production while naming "Too Little Too Late" and "Let It Rain" as highlights.

Norman Dreads of Prefix rated the album 6.5 out of 10, praising JoJo's vocal ability and the album's more mature R&B-influenced sound. He highlighted the contributions of producers such as Scott Storch, Swizz Beatz, Ryan Leslie, and Soulshock & Karlin, while noting that JoJo's performances remained the album's strongest element. Kelefa Sanneh of The New York Times offered a mixed review, stating that most of the album did not match the quality of "Too Little Too Late." He praised JoJo's vocals and performances on songs such as "The Way You Do Me" and "Anything," but criticized the abundance of ballads and some of the album's romantic themes. Jenny Eliscu of Rolling Stone gave the album two-and-a-half out of five stars, praising JoJo's vocal talent and the work of its high-profile producers but finding the material uneven. She highlighted "This Time" and "The Way You Do Me" while criticizing some of the album's production choices, including the use of the Toto sample on "Anything." Sawdey of PopMatters gave The High Road a two out of ten rating, arguing that the album relied too heavily on the success of "Too Little Too Late." While he acknowledged JoJo's vocal ability, he criticized the production and songwriting as generic, singling out tracks such as "This Time," "The Way You Do Me," and "Anything" as examples of the album's shortcomings.

== Commercial performance ==
The High Road debuted at number three on the US Billboard 200, selling 108,000 copies in its first week. Nearly a month after its release in the United States, on November 28, 2006, the album was certified gold by the Recording Industry Association of America (RIAA), and had sold 538,000 copies in the United States by March 2007. The album debuted at number 12 on the Canadian Albums Chart, becoming JoJo's first album to enter the top 20 in that country. It was certified gold by the Canadian Recording Industry Association (CRIA) on January 17, 2007, denoting shipments in excess of 50,000 units.

In the United Kingdom, The High Road debuted at number 59 on the UK Albums Chart, peaking at number 24 in its third week on the chart. On June 8, 2007, the British Phonographic Industry (BPI) certified it gold for shipping over 100,000 copies. Elsewhere, the album reached number 45 in Japan, number 94 in Belgium and number 96 in Switzerland. As of August 2015, The High Road had sold three million copies worldwide.

== Track listing ==
The High Road track listing
No.	Title	Writer(s)	Producer(s)	Length
1.	"This Time"	Scott Storch; Sean Garrett	Storch; Garrett^{[a]}	3:28
2.	"The Way You Do Me"	Swizz Beatz; Garrett	Swizz Beatz; Garrett^{[a]}	3:13
3.	"Too Little Too Late"	Josh Alexander; Billy Steinberg; Ruth-Anne Cunningham	Alexander; Vincent Herbert; Steinberg	3:41
4.	"The High Road"	Jonathan Rotem; Matthew Gerrard; Bridget Benenate	Jonathan "J.R." Rotem; Gerrard	3:50
5.	"Anything"	Beau Dozier; Mischke; Justin Trugman; David Paich; Jeff Porcaro	Dozier; Trugman	3:49
6.	"Like That"	Ryan Leslie; Corey Williams	Leslie	3:48
7.	"Good Ol'"	Soulshock; Kenneth Karlin; Lil' Eddie; Lisa Simmons; Francesca Richard	Soulshock and Karlin	4:08
8.	"Coming for You"	Soulshock; Karlin; Alex Cantrall; Lil' Eddie; Simmons; Richard	Soulshock and Karlin	3:30
9.	"Let It Rain"	Makeba Riddick; Mikkel S. Eriksen; Tor Erik Hermansen	Stargate; Riddick^{[b]}; Herbert^{[b]}	3:47
10.	"Exceptional"	Diane Warren	Peter Stengaard	3:43
11.	"How to Touch a Girl"	Steinberg; Alexander; Joanna Levesque	Alexander; Steinberg	4:27
12.	"Note to God"	Warren	Stengaard	4:27
Total length:				45:57

20th anniversary edition
No.	Title	Writer(s)	Producer(s)	Length
1.	"This Time"	Storch; Garrett	Storch; Garrett^{[a]}	3:28
2.	"The Way You Do Me"	Swizz Beatz; Garrett	Swizz Beatz; Garrett^{[a]}	3:13
3.	"Get It Poppin'"	Emile Ghantous; Erik Nelson	Ghantous; Nelson	3:41
4.	"Too Little Too Late"	Alexander; Steinberg; Cunningham	Alexander; Herbert; Steinberg	3:41
5.	"The High Road"	Rotem; Gerrard; Benenate	Rotem; Gerrard	3:50
6.	"Anything"	Dozier; Mischke; Trugman; Paich; Porcaro	Dozier; Trugman	3:49
7.	"I Can Take You There"	Bernard Edwards Jr.; Levesque	Focus…	4:52
8.	"Like That"	Leslie; Williams	Leslie	3:48
9.	"Good Ol'"	Soulshock; Karlin; Lil' Eddie; Simmons; Richard	Soulshock and Karlin	4:08
10.	"Coming for You"	Soulshock; Karlin; Cantrall; Lil' Eddie; Simmons; Richard	Soulshock and Karlin	3:30
11.	"Let It Rain"	Riddick; Eriksen; Hermansen	Stargate; Riddick^{[b]}; Herbert^{[b]}	3:47
12.	"Exceptional"	Warren	Stengaard	3:43
13.	"Do Whatcha Gotta Do"	Dozier	Dozier	4:29
14.	"How to Touch a Girl"	Steinberg; Alexander; Levesque	Alexander; Steinberg	4:27
15.	"Note to God"	Warren	Stengaard	4:27
16.	"Too Little Too Late" (Spanish version)	Alexander; Steinberg; Cunningham	Alexander; Herbert; Steinberg	3:39
17.	"Acepto La Realidad" (Versión Acústica)	Alexander; Steinberg; Cunningham	Alexander; Herbert; Steinberg	3:48
18.	"Behind The Scenes"			14:00
Total length:				82:01

=== Notes ===
- ^{^[a]} signifies a co-producer
- ^{^[b]} signifies a vocal producer
- Walmart exclusive edition includes the bonus track "Get It Poppin'" as track 13.
- Best Buy exclusive edition includes the bonus track "I Can Take You There" as track 13.
- Target and Circuit City exclusive editions include a bonus DVD featuring behind-the-scenes footage and music videos for "Leave (Get Out)", "Baby It's You", "Not That Kinda Girl" and "Too Little Too Late".
- 2021 worldwide reissue includes the bonus tracks "I Can Take You There" and "Get It Poppin'" as tracks 13 and 14, respectively.
- International edition includes the bonus tracks "Do Whatcha Gotta Do," "I Can Take You There," and the Spanish version of "Too Little Too Late" as tracks 13, 14, and 15, respectively.
- UK edition includes the bonus track "Leave (Get Out)" as track 15.
- Japanese edition includes the bonus track "Get It Poppin'" as track 16.

=== Sample credits ===
- "Anything" contains a sample of "Africa" by Toto.

== Personnel ==
Credits adapted from the liner notes of The High Road.

=== Musicians ===
- JoJo – vocal arrangement, lead vocals, background vocals
- J.R. Rotem – music, music arrangement (track 4)
- Matthew Gerrard – additional strings, additional horns, additional percussion, vocal arrangement (track 4)
- Bridget Benenate – vocal arrangement (track 4)
- Ryan Leslie – vocal arrangement, all instruments, programming (track 6)
- Corey Williams – vocal arrangement (track 6)
- Soulshock and Karlin – arrangement (tracks 7, 8); all instruments (track 7)
- Mikkel S. Eriksen – all instruments (track 9)
- Tor Erik Hermansen – all instruments (track 9)
- Makeba Riddick – background vocals (track 9)

=== Technical ===
- Scott Storch – production (track 1)
- Sean Garrett – co-production (tracks 1, 2)
- Wayne "The Brain" Allison – recording (track 1)
- Paul Foley – recording (tracks 1, 3–6, 10, 12); vocal recording (track 2); Pro Tools engineering (track 5)
- Vadim "Chiss" Chislov – recording assistance (track 1)
- Mark "Exit" Goodchild – vocal recording (track 1)
- Phil Tan – mixing (tracks 1, 9)
- Josh Houghkirk – engineering assistance (tracks 1, 9)
- Swizz Beatz – production (track 2)
- Eric "Erk" Vargas – recording (track 2)
- Rich Keller – mixing (track 2)
- Josh Alexander – production, recording (tracks 3, 11)
- Vincent Herbert – production (track 3); vocal production (track 9); executive production
- Billy Steinberg – production (tracks 3, 11)
- Dave Russell – mixing (tracks 3–7, 10–12); recording (track 4); vocal recording (track 9)
- Katia Lewin – engineering assistance (tracks 3, 6)
- Jonathan "J.R." Rotem – production (track 4)
- Matthew Gerrard – production (track 4)
- Jay Goin – engineering assistance (track 4)
- Matty Green – engineering assistance (tracks 4, 9, 10, 12)
- Beau Dozier – production, recording (track 5)
- Justin Trugman – production (track 5)
- Michael Woodrum – Pro Tools engineering (track 5)
- Scott Somerville – engineering assistance (track 5)
- Ryan Leslie – production, recording (track 6)
- Soulshock and Karlin – production (tracks 7, 8)
- Soulshock – mixing (track 8)
- Stargate – production (track 9)
- Makeba Riddick – vocal production (track 9)
- Mikkel S. Eriksen – recording (track 9)
- Peter Stengaard – production (tracks 10, 12)
- Alan Mason – engineering assistance (tracks 10, 11)
- Rob Arbittier – vocal recording (track 12)
- Gene Grimaldi – mastering
- Katie Gallagher – product management
- Genevieve Zaragoza – production coordination
- Jomo Hankerson – executive production
- Barry Hankerson – executive production

=== Artwork ===
- Heather Wesley – creative direction
- Stacey "Swade" Wade – art direction
- George Holz – photography

== Charts ==
=== Weekly charts ===
Chart (2006–2007)	Peak position
Australian Hitseekers Albums (ARIA)	19
Australian Urban Albums (ARIA)	22
Belgian Albums (Ultratop Flanders)	94
Canadian Albums (Nielsen SoundScan)	12
European Albums (Billboard)	92
Irish Albums (IRMA)	94
Japanese Albums (Oricon)	45
Scottish Albums (Official Charts)	32
Swiss Albums (Schweizer Hitparade)	96
UK Albums (Official Charts)	24
UK R&B Albums (Official Charts)	5
US Billboard 200	3

=== Year-end charts ===
Chart (2007)	Position
UK Albums (OCC)	188
US Billboard 200	166

== Certifications ==
Region	Certification	Certified units/sales
Canada (Music Canada)	Gold	50,000^{^}
United Kingdom (BPI)	Gold	100,000^{^}
United States (RIAA)	Gold	538,000
^{^} Shipments figures based on certification alone.

== Release history ==
Region	Date	Edition	Label	Ref.
United States	October 17, 2006	Standard	Da Family; Blackground; Universal	
United Kingdom	November 6, 2006	Standard	Mercury	
Australia	November 18, 2006	Standard	Universal	
Germany	November 24, 2006	Standard	Edel	
Japan	December 6, 2006	Standard	Universal	
Various	December 21, 2018	Re-recording	Clover Music	
Various	September 24, 2021	Standard (streaming)	Blackground	
Various	October 23, 2026	20th Anniversary (Streaming)	Seeker Music	

== The High Road (Clover Room Edition) ==
The High Road (Clover Room Edition)

Studio album (re-recorded) by JoJo
- Released: December 21, 2018
- Recorded: 2018
- Length: 45:49
- Label: Clover Music

JoJo chronology
JoJo (2018) (2018)	The High Road (Clover Room Edition) (2018)	Good to Know (2020)

On December 20, 2018, JoJo re-recorded The High Road along with her self-titled debut album and singles "Demonstrate" and "Disaster", released under JoJo's new label imprint Clover Music on December 21. The decision to re-record the singles and albums came from the removal of all of JoJo's original music released under Blackground Records from all streaming and digital selling platforms.

Blackground owns the master licensing to the original recordings and has control over their release. JoJo sought after getting the original songs and albums back online, but would never come to an agreement with the label. JoJo's lawyer stated they had reached the end of the statute of limitations on the re-record clause which gave her the rights to "cover" her own music.

Despite the releases of the original versions of JoJo and The High Road on digital and streaming platforms in 2021, JoJo stated that she does not benefit financially from the releases, encouraging fans to support the re-recorded versions instead.

=== Track listing ===
All tracks are noted as "Clover Room Edition".

The High Road (Clover Room Edition) track listing
No.	Title	Writer(s)	Producer(s)	Length
1.	"This Time"	Storch; Garrett	Storch; Garrett^{[a]}; Klynik^{[a]}	3:34
2.	"The Way You Do Me"	Swizz Beatz; Garrett	Swizz Beatz; Garrett^{[a]}; Klynik^{[a]}	2:50
3.	"Too Little Too Late"	Alexander; Steinberg; Cunningham	Alexander; Herbert; Steinberg; Klynik^{[a]}	3:43
4.	"The High Road"	Rotem; Gerrard; Benenate	Rotem; Gerrard; Klynik^{[a]}	3:53
5.	"Anything"	Dozier; Mischke; Trugman; Paich; Porcaro	Dozier; Trugman; Jordan XL^{[a]}	3:52
6.	"Like That"	Leslie; Williams	Leslie; Jordan XL^{[a]}	3:48
7.	"Good Ol'"	Soulshock; Karlin; Lil' Eddie; Simmons; Francci	Soulshock and Karlin; Jordan XL^{[a]}	4:11
8.	"Coming for You"	Soulshock; Karlin; Alex Cantrall; Lil' Eddie; Simmons; Francci	Soulshock and Karlin; Jordan XL^{[a]}	3:32
9.	"Let It Rain"	Riddick; Eriksen; Hermansen	Stargate; Riddick^{[b]}; Herbert^{[b]}; Klynik^{[a]}	3:45
10.	"Exceptional"	Warren	Peter Stengaard; Jordan XL^{[a]}	3:45
11.	"How to Touch a Girl"	Steinberg; Alexander; Levesque	Alexander; Steinberg; Jordan XL^{[a]}	4:29
12.	"Note to God"	Warren	Stengaard; Jordan XL^{[a]}	4:31
Total length:				45:49
