= Disaster (JoJo song) =

2011 single by JoJo

Single by JoJo
- Released: August 29, 2011
- Recorded: 2011
- Genre: Pop rock; power pop
- Length: 3:37
- Label: Blackground; Streamline; Interscope
- Songwriters: Joanna Levesque; Gino Barletta; Mario Marchetti; Marc Himmel
- Producer: Mario Marchetti

JoJo singles chronology
"Anything" (2007)	"Disaster" (2011)	"When Love Hurts" (2015)

Audio video
- "Disaster" on YouTube

"Disaster (2018)"

Single by JoJo
- Released: December 21, 2018
- Recorded: 2018
- Length: 3:39
- Label: Clover Music; Warner Bros.
- Songwriters: Joanna Levesque; Gino Barletta; Mario Marchetti; Marc Himmel
- Producer: Klynik

JoJo singles chronology
"FAB" (2016)	"Disaster (2018)" (2018)	"Demonstrate (2018)" (2018)

Audio video
- "Disaster (2018)" on YouTube

"Disaster" is a song recorded by American recording artist JoJo recorded for her third studio album, then titled Jumping Trains. The song was written by Gino Barletta, along with JoJo, Marc Himmel, and Mario Marchetti. The song was Produced by Mario Marchetti. "Disaster" premiered as the album's first single on US radio on August 29, 2011 via Interscope Records and it was made available for digital download on September 6, 2011. Musically, "Disaster" is a mid-tempo pop rock ballad, featuring elements of power pop. The song's lyrics describe a relationship that has gone from happy and blissful to tumultuous and disastrous.

The song received generally positive reviews from contemporary music critics, who noted its similarities to JoJo's 2006 single, "Too Little Too Late", and Jordin Sparks's "Battlefield". However, the song was also criticized for not showing any progression after a five-year hiatus. The single debuted at number 87 on the Billboard Hot 100, giving JoJo her first charting single since "Too Little Too Late". The single also charted on the Billboard Pop Songs, peaking at number 29.

The song's accompanying music video was directed by Benny Boom and shot in downtown Los Angeles. It premiered on JoJo's official website on November 1, 2011, and made available for viewing on Vevo on November 2, 2011 JoJo performed "Disaster" for the first time on Good Day Dallas on September 29, 2011. A digital remixes EP containing 5 official remixes of the song was released on March 13, 2012. On December 21, 2018, JoJo re-recorded and re-released the song as a stand-alone single from her own label Clover Music.

== Background and development ==
JoJo's third studio album had been delayed for more than five years due to issues with her record label, Da Family Entertainment, and the sorting out of distribution for the album. The album was reported finalized in June 2009, but more recording sessions were done for the album up until January 2011. Her debut mixtape Can't Take That Away from Me was released on September 7, 2010 through Rap-Up magazine as a prelude to her third album. "The Other Chick" was initially announced as the album's lead single. However, after JoJo went back in the studio and recorded more songs for the album, the label decided to release one of the new recordings as the lead single instead, with "The Other Chick" serving as a buzz single. Jojo commented, "It’s something cool that’ll introduce people to a more mature me, I suppose. It’s edgy, but it’s a buzz single."

"Disaster" was announced as the lead single from JoJo's third studio album, which was titled Jumping Trains at the time, in August 2011. JoJo described the song being about "a relationship, this young passionate love that takes a turn for the worse. This thing you once held in your hand just slips out of your control and turns into a disaster, but what I love about this song is that there's the sense at the end there's a whole world out there to explore, just because a relationship is over doesn't mean that your world is over. There's that light at the end of the tunnel and the song is just more aggressive than the pop records I've come out with before." It premiered on US radios on August 29, 2011, through Interscope Records. A week later, on September 6, 2011, the song was released to digital retailers.

== Release and remix ==
JoJo revealed the cover artwork and iTunes release date for "Disaster" via Rap-Up.com on August 26, 2011. The song was sent to US radio on August 29, 2011. Two days before its release, JoJo performed the song for the first time at Perez Hilton's second annual VMA pre charity event One Night In... Los Angeles event. The single had its radio premiere on August 29, 2011. It was made available for purchase as a digital download on September 6, 2011. In support of the single, JoJo was the supporting act for the Joe Jonas & Jay Sean Tour from September 6, 2011 through October 6, 2011.

A physical version of the new single was released to radio stations in the United States and was sold in concerts during the Joe Jonas & Jay Sean Tour. The disc includes an acoustic version of "Too Little Too Late". It officially impacted U.S. Top 40/Mainstream radio on October 25, 2011. On January 13, 2012 JoJo released a new remix version of "Disaster" featuring Jorj n Andy. Disaster (Remixes) was released on March 13, 2012 through Interscope, Blackground and Streamline Records. The maxi single is composed of five remix versions of the song. JoJo performed the Jorj N Andy Remix version of "Disaster" live during an appearance at Club Krave in Las Vegas on January 14, 2012.

On December 20, 2018, JoJo surprised fans with the re-release of Disaster along with her self-titled debut album, sophomore album The High Road and single Demonstrate, released under JoJo's new label imprint Clover Music on December 21. The decision to re-record the singles and albums came from the removal of all of JoJo's original music released under Blackground Records from all streaming and digital selling platforms. Blackground owns the master licensing to the original recordings and have control over its release. JoJo had sought to get the original songs and albums back on streaming and digital sales platforms, but could never come to an agreement with the label. JoJo's lawyer stated they’d reached the end of the statute of limitations on the re-record clause which gave her the rights to “cover” her own music.

== Composition and lyrical interpretation ==
JoJo – "Disaster"

"Disaster" is a pop rock ballad written by Gino Barletta, JoJo, Mario Marchetti, and Marc Himmel and produced by Mario Marchetti. The song was described by Barletta as an "edgy power pop song" with "a huge chorus". Backed by a drum and acoustic guitar, JoJo sings of a relationship turned sour, "I'm trying not to pretend/That it won't happen again and again like that Never thought it would end/Cause you got up in my head/In my head like that." According to JoJo, the song's lyrics are "basically about how sometimes you get so deep into a relationship, and it gets progressively horrifying and real disastrous, whether it be emotional abuse or another type of abuse, it's like, 'How did I end up in this storm?' So it's an emotional record, but it's definitely resilient in the end."

== Reception ==
=== Critical reception ===
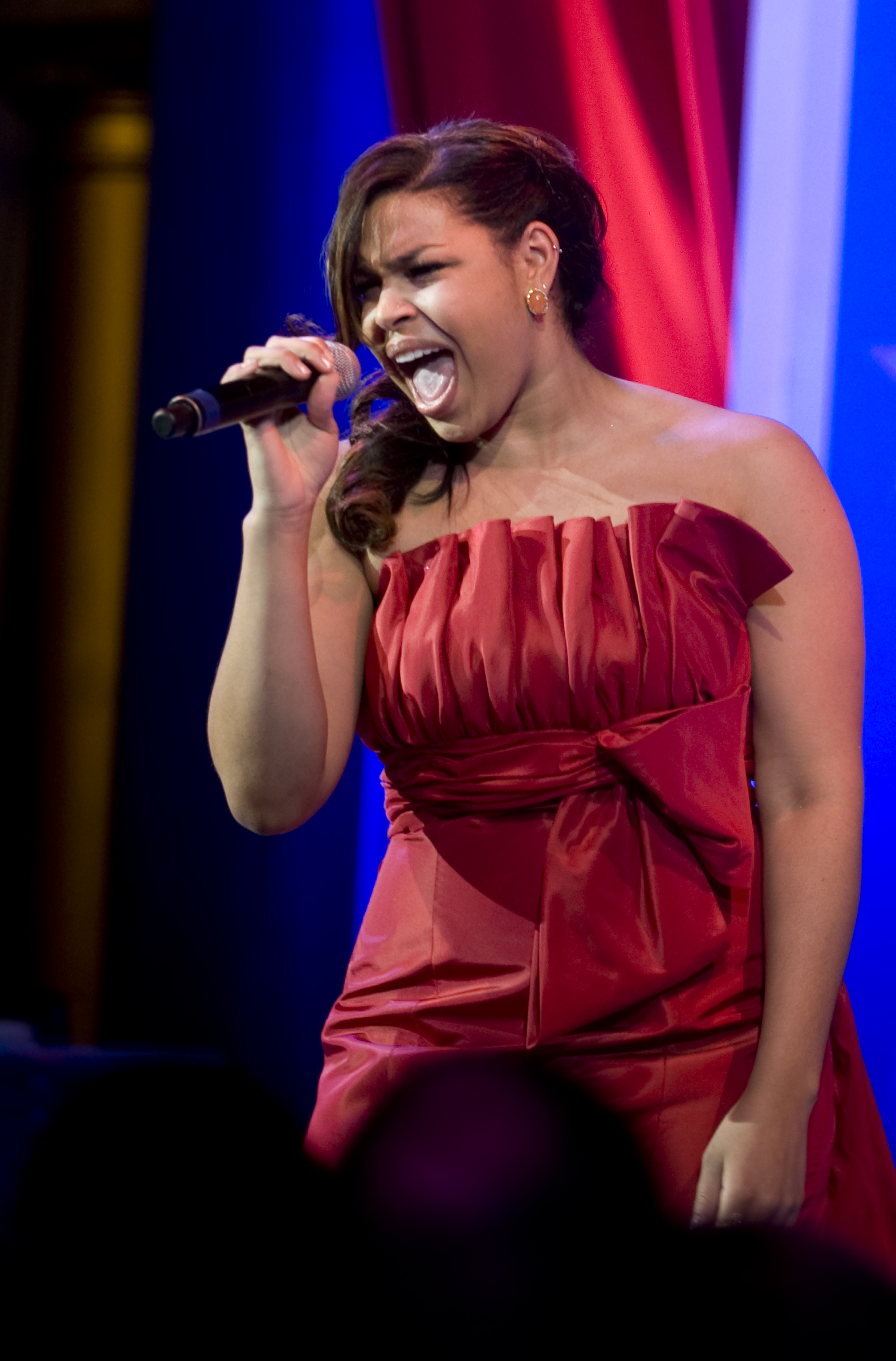
"Disaster" was compared to the Jordin Sparks song "Battlefield".

"Disaster" received generally positive reviews from contemporary music critics, who noted similarities to JoJo's "Too Little Too Late" (2006), as well as Jordin Sparks's "Battlefield" (2009). However, the song was also criticized for not showing any progression after a five-year hiatus. Scott Shetler of PopCrush reviewed JoJo's song, claiming "JoJo doesn’t appear to be jumping on the synthpop bandwagon like so many other pop stars, but the flipside of that independence is that her music doesn't necessarily sound current. 'Disaster' has the same basic pop-rock feel of JoJo’s last big hit, 2006's 'Too Little Too Late'. We’d like to see a little more artistic growth in five years, although JoJo is still just 20 years old, so she has plenty of time to figure out where she wants to take her sound as an adult." Katharine St. Asaph of Popdust rated the song three out of five stars, noting its similarities in composition to that of American Idol winner Jordin Sparks' song "Battlefield". Asaph favored "Disaster" over "Battlefield" because of JoJo's vocal dexterity on the bridge of the song. Bradley Stern of MuuMuse rated the song 4.5 out of five stars, also noting its similarities to "Battlefield" while praising "The crashing drums, dramatic strings and triumphantly marching mega-beat" and her "growth as both a vocalist and an individual."

=== Chart performance ===
"Disaster" debuted at number 87 on the U.S. Billboard Hot 100. It also debuted on the Billboard Pop Songs chart in the week of January 2, 2012 at number 38, making it her first single to chart in this category since 2007. It has since peaked at number 29. According to Nielsen SoundScan, "Disaster" has since sold 160,000 downloads to date.

== Live performance ==
JoJo announced on August 19, 2011 that she would be joining the Joe Jonas and Jay Sean Tour where she performed the song for the entire duration of the tour. She made her debut performance of the song at Perez Hilton's second annual VMA pre charity event One Night In... Los Angeles event two days before its radio debut. On a tour stop in Philadelphia JoJo gave a short acoustic Studio performance of the song with Q102 radio. She then performed the song on San Francisco’s NOW! 99.7 FM studio Lounge on September 19, 2011. She made her first TV performance of the song on Good Day Dallas on September 29, 2011. This was her first live TV performance in almost four years. JoJo also performed "Disaster" on 93.3 music radio station studio in Florida. She then made her second TV performance of the song on KTLA LA morning show on October 11, 2011. JoJo appeared at the 107.9 years end 2011 Jingle Ball on December 1 where she perform the song at the end of the show. Philadelphia’s Q102 hosted its annual Jingle Ball on December 7, 2011 where had performed the song. She also performed at the K104.7 Not so Silent Night on December 5, 2011. She has also performed the song on Boston's Fox News morning show on October 28, 2011.

== Music video ==
=== Background ===
My personal experience definitely has lent itself to not only this song but you know this whole album. I kind of like snapped in the recording process, I kinda lost my mind but it was great it was perfect, it was exactly what needed to happen. I was frustrated I was going through stuff and it was my outlet.

— JoJo on the set of "Disaster" music video

The music video for "Disaster" was directed by Benny Boom and English actor, Rafi Gavron was chosen to portray her love interest. The video was shot on September 14, 2011 in downtown Los Angeles. In an interview with Idolator.com she said that she "...wanted to show young, crazy love and how passionate it can be — how you get wrapped up in it, and it’s awesome and it’s fun and sexy...This video is a little rock and roll. It’s colorful". On October 11, 2011 JoJo previewed the video in and interview with FuseTV where we see her performing the song with her band and close up shots of her performing the song in a warehouse type location.

JoJo as she is performing with her band in the music video for "Disaster"

=== Release ===
A sneak peek teaser clip of was shown on MTV '10 On Top.' on October 29, 2011 four days before the videos release. The full video premiered on JoJo's official website on November 1, 2011 and was made available to VEVO on November 2.

When speaking on how she picked her on-screen love interest, Rafi Gavron. “In choosing our leading man, I wanted it to be someone that was genuinely a rough-around-the-edges kinda guy,” she said. “I had seen Rafi Gavron in Nick & Norah’s Infinite Playlist and thought he was a great actor and a natural choice for me. He embodied the edge and rugged sexiness that I wanted my guy to have. I wanted him to feel a bit like a bad boy from Boston, and although Rafi is from the UK, he pulled it off perfectly.” On February 23, 2012 an extended version of the original music video was released with additional scenes including the motorcycle stunt that was cut out from the original video. and it is accompanied by a remixed version of the song by DJ Kue.

== Track listings ==
Digital download

1. "Disaster" – 3:37

Disaster (remixes)

1. "Disaster" (DJ Kue remix) – 4:15
2. "Disaster" (Sidney Samson remix) – 4:42
3. "Disaster" (Baggi Begovic remix) – 6:32
4. "Disaster" (Ming + 2 Beeps remix) – 5:09
5. "Disaster" (Jorj n Andy remix) – 6:27

Digital download/streaming - 2018 reissue

1. "Disaster 2018" – 3:39

== Credits and personnel ==
Credits were adapted from Spotify.

- JoJo – vocals, songwriting, background vocals
- Mario Marchetti – production, songwriting
- Klynik - production (2018 reissue)
- Ryan Gladieux – record engineering, mixing
- Gino Barletta – songwriting
- Marc Himmel – songwriting

== Charts ==
Chart (2011–12)	Peak position
US Billboard Hot 100	87
US Pop Airplay (Billboard)	29

== Release history ==
List of release dates with formats
Country	Release date	Format	Label
United States	August 29, 2011	Radio premiere	Blackground, Streamline, Interscope Records
Australia	September 5, 2011	Contemporary hit radio	Blackground, Streamline, Interscope Records
United States	September 6, 2011	Digital download	Blackground, Streamline, Interscope Records
Canada	September 6, 2011	Digital download	Universal Music
Mexico	September 6, 2011	Digital download	Blackground/Interscope
Australia	September 9, 2011	Digital download	Blackground/Interscope
Belgium	September 9, 2011	Digital download	Blackground/Interscope
Denmark	September 9, 2011	Digital download	Blackground/Interscope
Finland	September 9, 2011	Digital download	Blackground/Interscope
France	September 9, 2011	Digital download	Blackground/Interscope
Japan	September 9, 2011	Digital download	Blackground/Interscope
Netherlands	September 9, 2011	Digital download	Blackground/Interscope
New Zealand	September 9, 2011	Digital download	Blackground/Interscope
Norway	September 9, 2011	Digital download	Blackground/Interscope
Sweden	September 9, 2011	Digital download	Blackground/Interscope
United States	October 25, 2011	Top 40/Mainstream radio	Blackground/Interscope
United States	March 13, 2012	Remixes EP (Digital download)	Blackground/Interscope
Worldwide	December 21, 2018	Digital download; streaming	Clover Music; Warner Bros.
