= Too Little Too Late =

2006 single by JoJo

Single by JoJo

from the album The High Road
- B-side: "Get It Poppin'"
- Released: July 24, 2006
- Recorded: September 2005
- Studio: Cryptic (Los Angeles); Sony (New York City)
- Genre: Pop; R&B
- Length: 3:40
- Label: Blackground; Universal Motown
- Songwriters: Josh Alexander; Billy Steinberg; Ruth-Anne Cunningham
- Producers: Josh Alexander; Vincent Herbert; Billy Steinberg

JoJo singles chronology
"Not That Kinda Girl" (2005)	"Too Little Too Late" (2006)	"How to Touch a Girl" (2006)

Music video
- "Too Little Too Late" on YouTube

"Too Little Too Late" is a song by American singer JoJo from her second studio album, The High Road (2006). It was written by Billy Steinberg, Josh Alexander and Ruth-Anne Cunningham, and produced by the former two with Da Family Records founder Vincent Herbert. The song was released as the album's lead single on July 24, 2006. A power ballad, "Too Little Too Late" is a pop and R&B breakup song about a girl who struggles about dealing with her first love as she refuses to reconcile with her ex-boyfriend despite his efforts to convince her. Its theme about an unsuccessful relationship drew comparisons to JoJo's 2004 debut single, "Leave (Get Out)".

Alexander began writing the song on his own before being joined by Steinberg and Cunningham to complete it. Although Cunningham always envisioned the song being recorded by JoJo, the songwriters had considered offering "Too Little Too Late" to American girl group the Pussycat Dolls. After learning that the Blackground Records was recruiting new material for JoJo, it was forwarded to the label two years after it had been written. JoJo decided to record "Too Little Too Late" to express how much she had matured since the release of her self-titled debut album in 2004, and personally selected the track to be the album's first single.

The song earned positive reviews from music critics, who praised its composition, mature themes and JoJo's vocal performance; some critics and media publications included it on their rankings of the best breakup songs. Commercially, the song was an international success, reaching the top-six in six countries in addition to the United States. When "Too Little Too Late" rose from number 66 to number three on the Billboard Hot 100 chart, it broke singer Mariah Carey's record for the largest jump to a top-three spot in the chart's history, which Carey had previously achieved with her 2001 single "Loverboy". The record was ultimately later broken by Kelly Clarkson's "My Life Would Suck Without You", which jumped from number 97 to number one on the issue dated February 7, 2009. "Too Little Too Late" remains JoJo's most commercially successful single to date.

Directed by Chris Robinson, the song's music video features a soccer theme, inspired by both JoJo's appreciation for the sport and her relationship with then-boyfriend Freddy Adu, a professional soccer player. Soccer player Mike Zaher, junior defender for the UCLA Bruins at the time, portrays JoJo's boyfriend in the music video, which also features appearances by the rest of the soccer team.

== Writing and recording ==
"Too Little Too Late" was written by songwriters Billy Steinberg and Josh Alexander, and singer-songwriter Ruth-Anne Cunningham. Alexander began writing "Too Little Too Late" on his own before Steinberg joined him to complete it, particularly contributing lyrics and a bridge to the music Alexander had already composed for the song's verses and chorus. Steinberg identified "Too Little Too Late" as one of the few songs in his career to which he contributed only after a portion of it had been written, with Alexander introducing the song to him after he had already conceived its title, as well as some of the ballad's lyrics and melody, admitting that Steinberg essentially "helped him finish writing that song and that lyric." Born in Ireland, "Too Little Too Late" was one of the first songs Cunningham was hired to write professionally after moving to Los Angeles, California from Dublin at the age of 17. Cunningham's manager at the time, Eamonn Maguire, had introduced her to Steinberg a few weeks after she relocated from Ireland. After hearing Cunningham perform one of her original songs, Steinberg invited her to co-write "Too Little Too Late", which they successfully completed by the following day during a writing session with Alexander. Upon finishing the song, Cunningham felt that it was most suitable for JoJo but the songwriters lacked the necessary contacts and resources to forward it to her at the time.

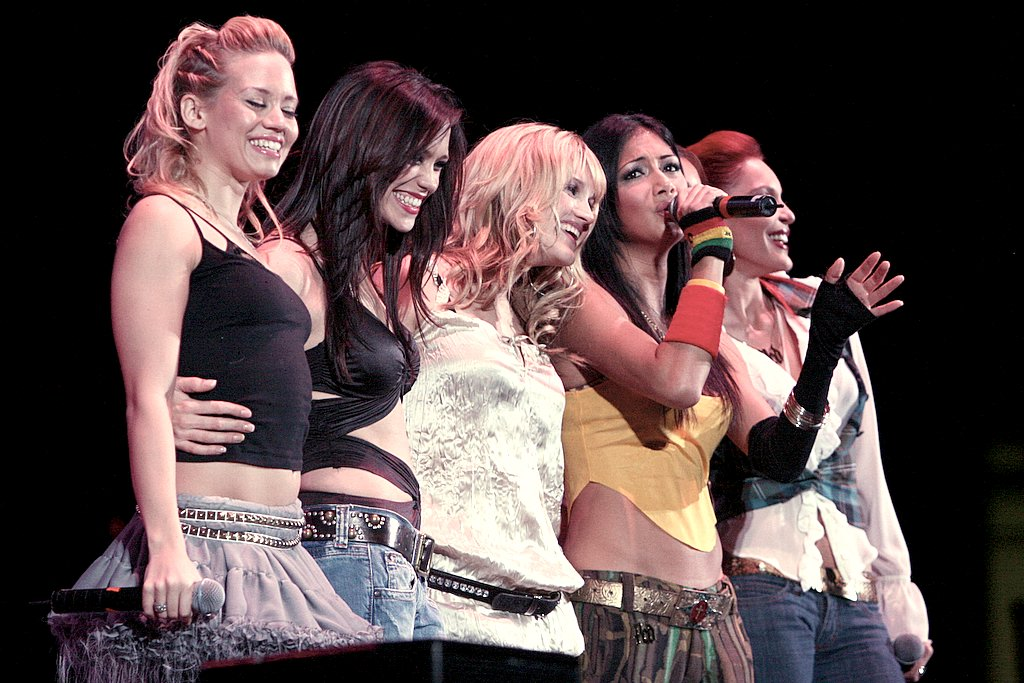
During the two years after it had been written, the songwriters considered offering "Too Little Too Late" to girl group the Pussycat Dolls.

"Too Little Too Late" is a more R&B-leaning track than Steinberg and Alexander's previous work, which had tended to be more pop rock-oriented. Writing the song in a more urban contemporary style was a conscious decision the songwriters made after realizing pop rock songs they had written for artists such as FeFe Dobson and The Veronicas were not being particularly embraced by contemporary radio stations in the United States; Steinberg elaborated, "I enjoy writing in all different styles. But I particularly enjoy hearing my songs on the radio, and these days pop radio is playing much more urban ... So there's a lot more gratification in writing a song for an artist like JoJo that radio embraces."

Two years followed before the song was finally recorded, during which the songwriters had considered giving it to girl group the Pussycat Dolls. Upon learning that Bruce Carbone, executive vice president of A&R at Universal Records, was interested in obtaining new material for JoJo's then-upcoming second studio album, Steinberg sent a demo recording of "Too Little Too Late" to Carbone, who immediately expressed how much he liked the song. Steinberg and Alexander were then introduced to record producer Vince Herbert, founder of Da Family Records, who invited the songwriters to co-produce the song alongside him. Blackground then flew Steinberg and Alexander out to New York, where they began producing the track before recording JoJo's vocal's in September 2005.

"Too Little Too Late" was one of the first prospective songs from the album that Herbert played for JoJo. The singer claimed that she wanted to record the song as soon as she heard it for the first time, elaborating, "When my team heard that song, they knew I could hit the sweet spot, musically and in terms of subject matter." According to Vibe, the overall more mature, personal sentiment of the album prompted her to record "Too Little Too Late", having experienced both her first love and first heartbreak since the release of her self-titled debut album. The song was recorded at both Cryptic Studios in Los Angeles, California and Sony Music Studios in New York, New York. The songwriters later returned to the studio to co-write a second song for the album with JoJo herself, titled "How to Touch a Girl". In regards his musical style, JoJo described Steinberg as a "classic writer and producer."

== Release ==
JoJo claimed that she knew she wanted the song to be the album's first single from the moment she recorded it, and in April 2006, she announced a pending release date of either August or September 2006. "Too Little Too Late" was ultimately released as the lead single from The High Road on August 15, 2006, via the Da Family/Blackground/Universal Records. "Get It Poppin'" was released as the single's B-side. A CD single was released in Europe that includes an instrumental version, two remixes produced by Full Phatt, and the music video.

A remix of the song is featured on the dance video game Dance Dance Revolution Hottest Party. A Spanish version of the song was released on select non-US editions of The High Road.

== Music and lyrics ==
"Too Little Too Late"
An audio sample of the song. A power ballad, its composition includes "airy synthesizers and synthetic-sounding strings".

"Too Little Too Late" is a pop and R&B breakup song about a girl ending a relationship with a boy who has mistreated her; she refuses to resume or salvage their relationship even though he begs her for a second chance. Performed in the key of F ♯ minor at a moderately slow tempo of 80 beats per minute, the song lasts a duration of three minutes and forty seconds (3:40). Beginning "Come with me/Stay the night", Bob Waliszewski of Plugged In identified "Too Little Too Late" as a song in which the protagonist "rejects a smarmy guy's game-playing advances". A power ballad, the track opens with a quiet verse before progressing into "a loud, sweeping chorus." Kelefa Sanneh, music journalist for The New York Times, observed that production-wise, the single features "airy synthesizers and synthetic-sounding strings" as opposed to loud guitars. Incorporating teen pop influences, JoJo performs several R&B-style arpeggios throughout the ballad, while her vocal range on the track spans three octaves, from D_{3} to E_{6}. JoJo herself explained that the track discusses moving on from one's first heartbreak, calling it a "big song" about expressing disappointment in a first love that is not as angry-sounding as her debut single "Leave (Get Out)". Contributing to HuffPost, Sam Lansky concurred that the single is "more restrained but no less bitter" than "Leave (Get Out)" while remaining "a guitar-driven sigh of impotent resignation." Musically, JoJo identified "Too Little Too Late" as a pop song into which R&B elements had been incorporated using various harmonies and chord progressions, "but still kept it rock in the hook when it explodes." Robert Copsey of Digital Spy cited elements of power pop in the song, similar to "Leave (Get Out)". Instrumentally, the track also incorporates both acoustic and electric guitars.

AXS contributor Jason Burke summarized that, in "Too Little Too Late", JoJo refuses "to be a slave to a conditional or convenient relationship", realizing she is stronger on her own despite sometimes experiencing temptations to relent due to the fact that her former partner continues to know "all the right things to say". Identified as a breakup anthem, "Too Little Too Late" features an empowering message to which most women can relate, despite their age. According to Max Goldberg of Complex, the break up song narrates "The story of a fed-up JoJo curbing some guy who wasn't up to snuff", with the artist taking a different approach to dealing with teenage heartbreak that does not involve crying about the situation to her mother. Spin's Brian Josephs similarly remarked that the singer "turned heartbreak into a hit". Lyrically, the song explores some mature concepts, such as the line "you don't like me, you just like the chase." According to Kathi Kamen Goldmark of Common Sense Media, the ballad is about heartbreak and refusing to repeat the same mistake, demonstrated by the lyrics "You say you dream of my face/but you don't like me, you just like the chase...It doesn't matter anyway", with JoJo repeating the refrain "you know it's just too little, too late" several times throughout the song. Cosmopolitan's Dara Adeeyo received "Too Little Too Late" as a reminder that "relationships usually end for a reason." People's Julia Emmanuele compared this line to an Instagram caption. The Boston Globe's Maura Johnston described the song as "chiding" in tone, while Sam Willett of Consequence of Sound described its mood as "sassy" and a "slap-in-the-face".

Describing it as simultaneously "a hate track" and "a heartbreak track", Jane Hu, a music critic for Medium, compared the song to Whitney Houston's "It's Not Right but It's Okay" (1999) as though it "were sung by a 15-year-old." Some music journalists have speculated or not the song potentially correlates to JoJo's own dating life, particularly her relationship with athlete Freddy Adu, which ended around the time the song was released. Believing that "art predicted life" when she was first introduced to the track, JoJo explained, "when I started dating a few years later, I wondered if those songwriters hadn't instinctively picked up on something."

== Critical reception ==
"Too Little Too Late" received positive reviews from music critics. Entertainment Weekly's Leah Greenblatt cited "Too Little Too Late" as an example of "the best songwriting a major-label budget can buy", while Billboard identified the song as a track "that can dwell comfortably on both the pop and AC charts", appealing to "listeners of all ages." Writing for AllMusic, Matt Collar called the single "ridiculously overwrought and utterly addictive". Similarly, Amazon.ca's Tammy La Gorce described the song as "addictive but not over-the-top". Another Billboard critic felt that the song was better than most singles playing on the radio at the time, lauding it as a track that "provides desperately needed balance to a top 40 landscape that is lacking a lot in the way of singable melodies." The writer also praised JoJo's vocal maturity, concluding, "With so many disappointing 'event' singles on the airwaves, radio needs this record." Kelefa Sanneh of The New York Times felt that "Too Little Too Late" was superior to all other tracks on its parent album. About.com's Bill Lamb was receptive towards JoJo's vocal performance, writing that the singer "provides just enough control to keep [its] sentiments ... from going overboard and, by the end of the song, proves high notes are well within her range". Crowning the song one of the best 10 "Feel-Good Break-Up Songs" in 2007, Slice contributor Nicolle Weeks joked that nothing is "more humbling than a twerpy 15-year-old who can concisely summarize the way I feel about my stunted relationship".

"It might have baffled JoJo at the time as well, yet you'd never be able to tell from her delivery ... And herein lies a basic principle of the pop song: JoJo's performance on 'Too Little Too Late' is irreducible to any evidence of authenticity. She did not have to write the song, nor live its lyrics at the time of recording, for it to cut across as real. It's real because it sounds real. We're all bound to meet an asshole or two between 15 and 25. That's the antidote of the enduring pop kiss-off, though its insights probably also do often come a little too late."

— Music critic Jane Hu of Medium explaining the song's universal appeal.

In a more lukewarm review, Evan Sawdey from PopMatters described the track as "appropriately melodramatic," drawing similarities between it and JoJo's debut single "Leave (Get Out)" only "without the angry chorus". Sawdey described the song as "something that Alanis Morissette might have recorded for her last I'm-no-longer-angry-and-therefore-am-content-with-plain-ballads album." However, the critic concluded that the track had more "personality" than the other tracks on The High Road. Contributing to Rolling Stone, music critic Jenny Eliscu wrote that the ballad demonstrates JoJo's "nuanced command of how to work an R&B; arpeggio like a pro." In another article for Rolling Stone, Robert Kemp described "Too Little Too Late" as "about as perfect a pop song as they come." Alex Macpherson from The Guardian wrote that the singer remains "at her best when compulsively dissecting emotional situations straight out of high-school movies via the medium of big, heartfelt choruses", identifying "Too Little Too Late" as a "wonderfully weepy pinnacle". Similarly, People's Oliver Jones wrote that the singer "finds her musical comfort zone" singing "Too Little Too Late". Fraser M. of BBC Online described the song as "a slab of confident, sophisticated maturo-pop" but felt that the song's production grew repetitive in addition to overwhelming. The critic concluded that the song was a "catchy tune" that "lends itself well to a singalong in the car". In 2007, "Too Little Too Late" earned JoJo a Boston Music Award for Female Vocalist of the Year. Cunningham won an ASCAP songwriting award for her contributions to the song.

In the years following its release, the song has continued to receive retrospective positive reception. Medium contributor Jane Hu opined that "You could not dream up a more perfect pop track", writing "there's something about 'Too Little Too Late' that continues to exemplify everything I want from the [pop music] genre". Furthermore, the critic wrote that the single is "not a one-hit-wonder teen peak, but in fact, only the start of JoJo's artistic trajectory", concluding, "After almost a decade, the prescient maturity of 'Too Little Too Late' ... baffles me every time." Retrospectively, in 2016 Vanessa Okoth-Obbo, contributing to Pitchfork, described "Too Little Too Late" as an "excellent young love anthem". AwesomenessTV's Alexis Joy called the song "terrific" and "our go-to #Throwback song!". In 2016, AXS ranked "Too Little Too Late" JoJo's second best song, believing that its popularity eclipsed that of "Leave (Get Out)". That year, Capital XTRA described the song as "an epic song." In 2016, GQ's Lauren Larson crowned "Too Little Too Late" the "breakup ballad of the decade." In 2017, People wrote that "Too Little Too Late" was one of the 14 most "savage" breakup anthems ever recorded. According to Louise Bruton of The Irish Times, the song proved that JoJo was capable of competing against the likes of singers Kelly Clarkson and Pink at the time of its release.

== Commercial performance ==
"Too Little Too Late" remains JoJo's biggest hit to date. "Too Little Too Late" appeared on both Billboard's pop and adult contemporary charts, became a staple on radio stations during 2006. "Too Little Too Late" initially debuted at number 13 on the Bubbling Under Hot 100 Singles the week of August 19, 2006, topping the chart the week after. The following week, it jumped to the Billboard Hot 100 at number 90. In its second week on the chart, "Too Little Too Late" moved from number 66 to number three due to a 121,000 increase in digital downloads, becoming the largest jump into the top-three spot in Billboard history. This broke the record previously set by American singer Mariah Carey for her song "Loverboy" (2001), and became the biggest one-week jump in the chart's history. It is her first and so far only single to make it to the top 10 of the Hot 100 chart. The song remains her highest-charting single on the chart. Additionally, the song peaked at number two on Mediabase. During the week of November 11, 2006, the song was number one on AOL Music, having amassed streams surpassing 296,676. The single sold 821,000 digital downloads as of March 2007. By October 2011, "Too Little Too Late" had sold over one million copies.

"Too Little Too Late" achieved success worldwide, peaking within the top 10 in six other countries outside the United States. In the United Kingdom, the single debuted at number 22 on the UK Singles Chart based on digital downloads alone two weeks before its physical CD single release. Following its physical release, the song peaked at number four, becoming JoJo's second top five and third top 10 single in the United Kingdom.

The song reached the top 10 in both in Australia and New Zealand. In the latter, "Too Little Too Late" debuted at number 11 and reached its peak of number 5 in its sixth week.

Considered to be her "big break" into the music industry, the song is credited with launching Cunningham's songwriting career. As of 2016, Cunningham considers the success of "Too Little Too Late" the highlight of her career because it was her first song to achieve international success.

== Music video ==
=== Background ===
JoJo gave fans a sneak peek of the video on June 3, 2006, in a short behind-the-scenes segment on CD USA. On June 11, pictures from the set of the video leaked onto Wireimage.com. Her RV co-star Robin Williams and his daughter Zelda were also on the set and appeared in behind-the-scenes footage included on the Target exclusive The High Road bonus DVD.

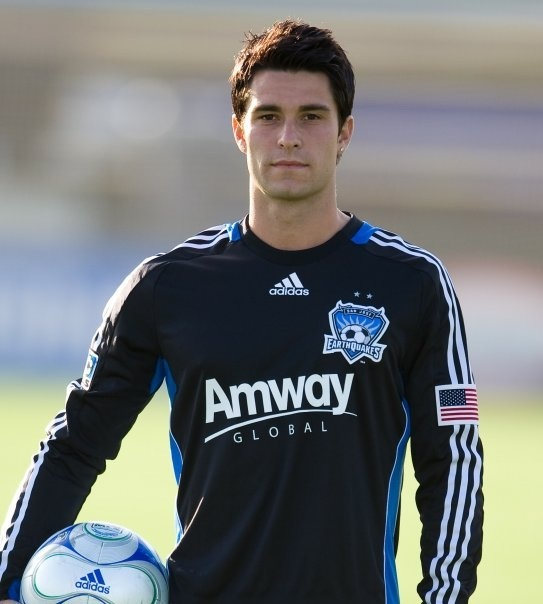
Mike Zaher was cast as JoJo's boyfriend in the music video for "Too Little Too Late".

The music video for "Too Little Too Late" was directed by Chris Robinson, who JoJo claims had always been her first choice to direct the project; the idea to incorporate sports into the video originated from Robinson. Before deciding on soccer, JoJo considered featuring American football in the video until Robinson convinced her that soccer would have more universal appeal due to being "the biggest sport in the world." JoJo's then-relationship with soccer player Freddy Adu, combined with the fact that the 2006 FIFA World Cup was approaching, are believed to have inspired the music video's theme. The video was filmed in spring 2006 during the playoffs. JoJo had decided against casting a professional actor or model as her love interest in the music video, feeling that hiring an untrained performer would offer "more of a real feel to the video". Professional soccer player Mike Zaher, junior defender of the UCLA Bruins, was cast as JoJo's boyfriend David in the music video. Zaher was 21 years-old and a sophomore at the University of California, Los Angeles at the time. He had initially been told that he and his teammates would be involved in a music video for actress Lindsay Lohan. Though he was initially only intended to be featured as an extra, JoJo personally selected Zaher to play the role of her boyfriend in the video after he was screen tested.

JoJo and Zaher spent three days traveling around Los Angeles filming various scenes for the music video. The soccer scenes were filmed at East Los Angeles College's football stadium, while other scenes were split between Universal Studios and a home in Hollywood, California, which was located near Highway 10. The on-screen couple's relationship continued into a friendship off-set. Despite initially negotiating to be paid $8,000 for his contributions to the music video, Zaher was ultimately not allowed to accept payment due to National Collegiate Athletic Association (NCAA) rules at the time, which prohibited him from accepting any soccer-related payment.

"Too Little Too Late" was first shown on July 17 on AOL Music's First View and aired on MTV and BET in fall 2006.

=== Synopsis and reception ===
At the start of the video, JoJo witnesses David (Zaher) flirting with a blonde-haired girl at a party while holding a glass drink in his hand. The couple talk and David invites JoJo to go to an important soccer game for his team. As the song begins, it shows JoJo at home, reminiscing about time she and David spent together. These shots are intercut with David playing soccer. David is later shown at a party, where he declines a phone call from JoJo before proceeding to flirt with other girls. In the video's finale, rain begins to pour at David's soccer game, which JoJo has chosen not to attend. At the same time, JoJo throws out mementos of her and David and sings in the pouring rain. At the soccer game, David ends up missing a crucial goal and his team loses. The video ends with the camera zooming out and panning away from JoJo's window as the rain subsides.

"Too Little Too Late" was first shown on July 17 on AOL Music's First View and aired on MTV and BET in fall 2006. In the United Kingdom, the video for "Too Little Too Late" premiered on October 14, 2006, on The Box's Kopooka Hot. By October 2006, the music video had been number one on iTunes, Yahoo and AOL. The video also peaked at number two on TRL, after premiering at number 9. AllMusic's Matt Collar wrote that the video demonstrates JoJo's "suburban cheerleader slinging hip-hop attitude", comparing her persona to those of actress Jennifer Aniston and singer Beyoncé.

JoJo and Adu ended their relationship shortly after the video was released, though both denied that the music video's plot had anything to do with this.

== Live performances and covers ==
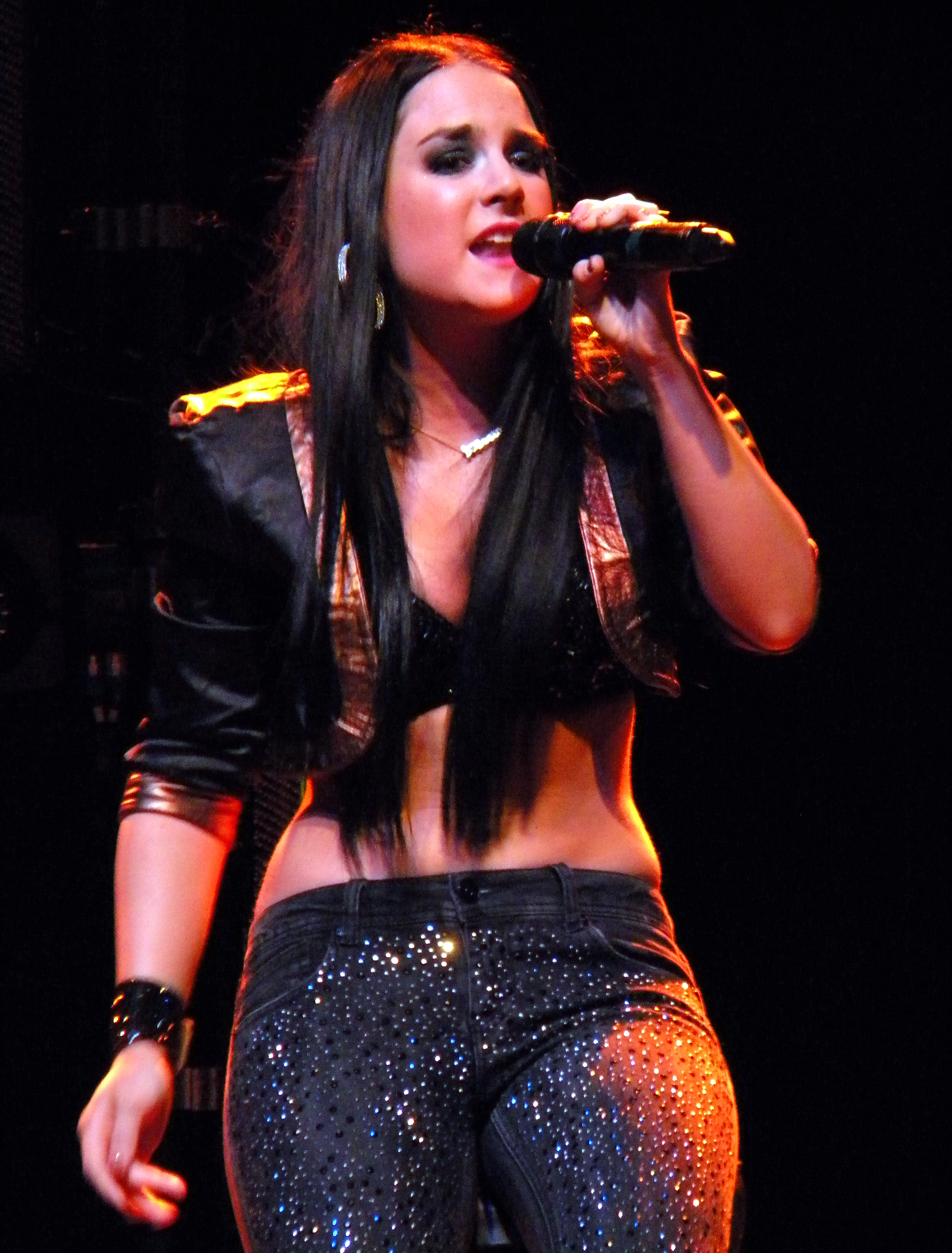
JoJo performing "Too Little Too Late" in 2011

JoJo's first scheduled performance of the single was during the Miss Teen USA 2006, which aired on August 15, 2006. On October 17, 2006, the singer performed "Too Little Too Late" live on both The Today Show and TRL. This was followed by a series of performances to promote both the song and The High Road between October and November 2006: Live with Regis and Kelly (October 18), The Tonight Show with Jay Leno (October 20), The Ellen DeGeneres Show (October 25), The Megan Mullally Show (October 27), The View (November 7), CD USA, Sessions@AOL and Music Choice.

In June 2011, JoJo performed "Too Little Too Late" at the Girls Who Rock benefit concert. JoJo included the song in her set list of her 2015 "I Am JoJo Tour". Mehek Seyid, a writer for Live in Limbo, reviewed the singer's rendition at the Mod Club in Toronto as having "attitude and confidence that defined the Billboard hit [when it] first circulated in the 2000s." In January 2017, JoJo sang verses of "Too Little Too Late" with elementary school choir the PS22 Chorus. JoJo aperformed the song throughout her "Mad Love Tour". Reviewing her performance at the O_{2} Academy Islington, Attitude wrote that JoJo's rendition of "Too Little Too Late" is a "reminder of the pipes that made JoJo one of pop's most promising young stars". The Atlanta Journal-Constitution Jewel Wicker called her live rendition one of the show's "great moments".

In late October 2007, Daniel Rossen of Grizzly Bear recorded a version of the song in honor of bandmate Ed Droste's 29th birthday. Musician Daniel Rossen, one of the two lead vocalists of the band Grizzly Bear, covered "Too Little Too Late" live in concert in February 2009. Bandmate Ed Droste's wanted Rossen to deliver the cover "very seriously, as if he really meant all those lyrics". Stereogum described Rossen's rendition as "great, dusty and hazy and hooky". Sam Willett of Consequence of Sound reviewed Rossen's version as "a killer cover" that has been arranged "into a simultaneously soothing and haunting collage of echoing harmonies and guitar textures." According to The Guardian music critic Jude Rogers, the cover was part of the band's effort to make their live performances more enjoyable to audiences "when you're a man in your late 20s who can't hide behind a persona."

The song was sampled by electronic music producer Daniel Lopatin on the third track of his album Chuck Person's Eccojams Vol. 1.

== Track listings ==
- UK and Australian CD single
1. "Too Little Too Late" (album version) – 3:39
2. "Get It Poppin'" – 3:41
- German CD single
1. "Too Little Too Late" – 3:47
2. "Too Little Too Late" (Full Phatt remix) (featuring Tah Mac) – 4:24
3. "Too Little Too Late" (Full Phatt remix) – 3:53
4. "Too Little Too Late" (instrumental) – 3:47
5. "Too Little Too Late" (video) – 4:04

== Credits and personnel ==
Credits adapted from the liner notes of The High Road.

- JoJo – vocal arrangement, lead vocals, background vocals
- Josh Alexander – production, recording
- Vincent Herbert – production
- Billy Steinberg – production
- Paul Foley – recording
- Dave Russell – mixing
- Katia Lewin – engineering assistance
- Gene Grimaldi – mastering

== Charts ==
=== Weekly charts ===
Weekly chart performance for "Too Little Too Late"
Chart (2006–2007)	Peak position
Australia (ARIA)	10
Australian Urban (ARIA)	5
Austria (Ö3 Austria Top 40)	40
Belgium (Ultratop 50 Flanders)	44
Canada CHR/Top 40 (Billboard)	4
Canada Digital Songs (Billboard)	3
Canada Hot AC (Billboard)	11
Czech Republic Airplay (ČNS IFPI)	66
Denmark (Tracklisten)	11
Europe (European Hot 100 Singles)	10
France Airplay (SNEP)	49
Germany (GfK)	30
Hungary (Rádiós Top 40)	25
Ireland (IRMA)	2
Italy (FIMI)	11
Lithuania (EHR)	13
Netherlands (Dutch Top 40 Tipparade)	6
Netherlands (Single Top 100)	96
New Zealand (Recorded Music NZ)	5
Romania (Romanian Top 100)	20
Russia Airplay (TopHit)	8
Scottish Singles Sales (Official Charts)	4
Sweden (Sverigetopplistan)	18
Switzerland (Schweizer Hitparade)	53
UK Singles (Official Charts)	4
UK Hip Hop/R&B (Official Charts)	1
US Billboard Hot 100	3
US Adult Contemporary (Billboard)	28
US Adult Pop Airplay (Billboard)	12
US Pop Airplay (Billboard)	2
US Pop 100 (Billboard)	2

=== Year-end charts ===
2006 year-end chart performance for "Too Little Too Late"
Chart (2006)	Position
US Billboard Hot 100	72
US Pop 100 (Billboard)	41

2007 year-end chart performance for "Too Little Too Late"
Chart (2007)	Position
Australia (ARIA)	82
Australian Urban (ARIA)	28
Brazil (Crowley)	6
Europe (European Hot 100 Singles)	88
Russia Airplay (TopHit)	99
UK Singles (OCC)	45
US Pop 100 (Billboard)	80

== Certifications ==
Certifications for "Too Little Too Late"
Region	Certification	Certified units/sales
Australia (ARIA)	Gold	35,000^{^}
Brazil (Pro-Música Brasil)	Gold	30,000^{‡}
Denmark (IFPI Danmark)	Gold	4,000^{^}
New Zealand (RMNZ)	2× Platinum	60,000^{‡}
United Kingdom (BPI)	Platinum	600,000^{‡}
United States (RIAA)	Platinum	1,000,000^{‡}
^{^} Shipments figures based on certification alone.^{‡} Sales+streaming figures based on certification alone.

== Release history ==
Release dates and formats for "Too Little Too Late"
Region	Date	Format	Label(s)	Ref.
United States	July 24, 2006	Contemporary hit radio	Blackground; Universal Motown	
United States	July 24, 2006	Rhythmic contemporary radio	Blackground; Universal Motown	
New Zealand	August 15, 2006	Digital download	Blackground	
United Kingdom	August 15, 2006	Digital download	Mercury	
United States	September 12, 2006	Digital download	Blackground	
United States	September 25, 2006	Hot adult contemporary radio	Blackground; Universal Motown	
Germany	November 10, 2006	CD single	Edel	
United Kingdom	January 8, 2007	CD single	Mercury	
