= Anything (JoJo song) =

2007 single by JoJo

- UK cover

Single by JoJo

from the album The High Road
- B-side: "Get It Poppin'"
- Released: March 20, 2007
- Studio: Chaos Theory (Encino, California); Sony (New York City); Sound Moves (Sun Valley, California)
- Genre: Synth-pop; power pop; R&B
- Length: 3:50
- Label: Blackground; Universal Motown
- Songwriters: Beau Dozier; Mischke; Justin Trugman; David Paich; Jeff Porcaro
- Producers: Beau Dozier; Justin Trugman

JoJo singles chronology
"How to Touch a Girl" (2006)	"Anything" (2007)	"Disaster" (2011)

Visualizer
- "Anything" on YouTube

Audio video
- "Anything (2018)" on YouTube

"Anything" is a song by American singer JoJo from her second studio album, The High Road (2006). It was released as the album's third and final single on March 20, 2007. Written by Beau Dozier, Mischke, and Justin Trugman, the track contains a sample from Toto's 1982 song "Africa", written by David Paich and Jeff Porcaro.

The single served as the second official single from The High Road in European countries and was released in the United Kingdom on May 7, 2007; it began gaining airplay there on March 24, 2007, eventually debuting on BBC Radio 1's playlist under the B-list section. JoJo was in the UK during the first two weeks of May to promote the single; she performed at London's G-A-Y on May 12, and appeared on GMTV on May 8 as part of a series of radio and television interviews. "Anything" remained in the top 40 of the UK Singles Chart for three weeks.

On September 4, 2013, a remix of the song was released featuring American rapper Casey Veggies and Italian musician Francesco.

== Critical reception ==
In About.com's review of The High Road, Bill Lamb called "Anything" a "tasty pop confection."

== Music video ==
The music video for "Anything" was expected to premiere on May 2, 2007. JoJo's UK street team had launched a competition for fans to create their own video for "Anything" that would appear on the enhanced CD when the single was released. It was announced that member "TheHighRoad" won the video mission and his video would be placed on the official website, but fans who wanted to watch it would have to buy the CD because it "unlocks" the video. JoJo posted on her Myspace page that an official video was not completed and that she had asked Blackground Records to facilitate the production process with her and her management. An official video never surfaced.

== Track listings ==
- UK CD single
1. "Anything" – 3:50
2. "Anything" (WaWa Club Mix) – 7:07

Also includes the winning fan videos for "Anything".

- German CD single
1. "Anything" – 3:50
2. "Anything" (instrumental) – 3:51
3. "Get It Poppin'" – 3:41
4. "Too Little Too Late" (Full Phatt Remix featuring Tah Mac) – 4:24

== Credits and personnel ==
Credits adapted from the liner notes of The High Road.

- JoJo – vocal arrangement, lead vocals, background vocals
- Beau Dozier – production, recording
- Justin Trugman – production
- Dave Russell – mixing
- Michael Woodrum – Pro Tools engineering
- Scott Somerville – engineering assistance
- Gene Grimaldi – mastering

== Charts ==
Chart (2007)	Peak position
Europe (European Hot 100 Singles)	57
France Airplay (SNEP)	75
Ireland (IRMA)	18
Scottish Singles Sales (Official Charts)	24
UK Singles (Official Charts)	21
UK Hip Hop/R&B (Official Charts)	8
US Pop Airplay (Billboard)	38

== Release history ==
Region	Date	Format(s)	Label(s)	Ref(s).
United States	March 20, 2007	Contemporary hit radio	Blackground; Universal Motown	
United Kingdom	May 7, 2007	CD single; digital download	Mercury	
Germany	May 18, 2007	Digital EP	Edel	
Germany	June 22, 2007	CD single	Edel	
