= How to Touch a Girl =

Single by JoJo

from the album The High Road
- Released: November 14, 2006
- Studio: Cryptic (Los Angeles)
- Genre: Teen pop; R&B
- Length: 4:29
- Label: Blackground; Universal
- Songwriters: Billy Steinberg; Josh Alexander; Joanna Levesque
- Producers: Josh Alexander; Billy Steinberg

JoJo singles chronology
"Too Little Too Late" (2006)	"How to Touch a Girl" (2006)	"Anything" (2007)

Audio sample
- file; help

Music video
- "How to Touch a Girl" on YouTube

"How to Touch a Girl" is a song by American singer JoJo from her second studio album, The High Road (2006). It was released in the United States only as the album's second single on November 14, 2006. Written by JoJo, Billy Steinberg, and Josh Alexander and produced by Steinberg and Alexander, it was the first single of JoJo's career on which she is credited as a writer. The song makes a lyrical reference to Whitney Houston's 1985 song "Saving All My Love for You" in its bridge.

== Critical reception ==
The song was well received by critics. Chuck Taylor of Billboard said that "'How to Touch a Girl' again casts the youngster with a crafty melody, albeit strikingly similar in structure to the previous hit. Despite the bizarre, almost perverse title, this track could propel the burgeoning talent all the way." In a review of The High Road, Bill Lamb called the song "a near perfect piece of teen pop-R&B."

== Chart performance ==
"How to Touch a Girl" failed to chart on the US Billboard Hot 100, becoming JoJo's second single to miss the chart after 2005's "Not That Kinda Girl". The single did, however, peak at number four on the Bubbling Under Hot 100 Singles chart and at number 76 on the Billboard Pop 100. It also reached 46 on the Pop 100 Airplay component chart of the latter in early 2007.

== Music video ==
The music video, directed by Syndrome, premiered on MTV's TRL on December 7, 2006, and on BET's 106 & Park on January 16, 2007. The video shows clips of JoJo sitting in a room filled with old vinyl records, sitting on a staircase, and singing on a Los Angeles rooftop at sunset. There are also scenes of her in an apartment in a green dress; special effects allow JoJo to be seen multiple times in the same shot. There is also a storyline involving a young couple on a date. Near the end of the video, a boy played by Cody Longo, seemingly her boyfriend, meets JoJo in her room with the albums, and the two embrace.

== Track listing ==
- US promotional CD single
1. "How to Touch a Girl" (Radio Edit) – 4:02
2. "How to Touch a Girl" (Instrumental) – 4:30
3. "How to Touch a Girl" (Call Out Hook) – 0:42

== Credits and personnel ==
Credits adapted from the liner notes of The High Road.

- JoJo – vocal arrangement, lead vocals, backgrounds vocals
- Josh Alexander – production, recording
- Billy Steinberg – production
- Dave Russell – mixing
- Alan Mason – engineering assistance
- Gene Grimaldi – mastering

== Charts ==
Chart performance for "How to Touch a Girl"
Chart (2006–2007)	Peak position
US Bubbling Under Hot 100 (Billboard)	4
US Pop 100 (Billboard)	76
