= Leave (Get Out) =

2004 single by JoJo

Single by JoJo

from the album JoJo
- B-side: "Not That Kinda Girl"
- Released: February 24, 2004
- Studio: Soulpower (Los Angeles, California); Westlake (West Hollywood, California)
- Genre: Pop; R&B
- Length: 4:02
- Label: Da Family; Blackground
- Songwriters: Soulshock; Kenneth Karlin; Alex Cantrall; Phillip "Whitey" White
- Producer: Soulshock & Karlin

JoJo singles chronology
"Leave (Get Out)" (2004)	"Baby It's You" (2004)

Music video
- "Leave (Get Out)" on YouTube

"Leave (Get Out)" is a song by American singer JoJo from her self-titled debut studio album (2004). It was released as the album's lead single and as JoJo's debut single on February 24, 2004. The song was produced by Danish production duo Soulshock & Karlin.

"Leave (Get Out)" became a commercial success, reaching number 12 on the US Billboard Hot 100 and charting worldwide, entering the top 10 in 11 countries. The single was certified gold by the Recording Industry Association of America (RIAA) on October 25, 2004. When the single reached number one on Billboard's Mainstream Top 40 chart, JoJo became the youngest female solo artist to have a number-one single on pop radio in the United States, at age 13.

== Release and production ==
"Leave (Get Out)" was written by Soulshock, Kenneth Karlin, Alex Cantrall and Phillip "Whitey" White of the Trackheads. Production and arrangement were helmed by Soulshock & Karlin. The song was recorded at Soulpower Studios and Westlake Studios in Los Angeles, California. Soulshock also mixed the song at Soulpower Studios and provided all the instruments with Karlin. The guitars, however, were performed by Eric Jackson and Sean Hurley. "Leave (Get Out)" was released as JoJo's debut single on February 24, 2004, through Blackground Records, via digital download and physical single. The single released in the United States included the song and a b-side, "Not That Kinda Girl". On June 21, 2004, the song was released to European markets in CD and maxi-single formats. The song was released in the United Kingdom and Ireland on August 30, 2004, as a CD single and digital download.

== Composition ==
"Leave (Get Out)" is a pop and R&B song, with a length of four minutes and two seconds. According to the digital music sheet published at Musicnotes by EMI Music Publishing, the song is written in a key of D minor. The song has a moderate groove in common time with a tempo of 87 beats per minute. It follows a basic sequence of Gm7-Dm11-C-B♭(add9) as its chord progression. JoJo's vocals range from a F_{3} to a G_{5}. Lyrically, "Leave (Get Out)" is about declaring independence.

During Sessions@AOL, JoJo said, "'Leave (Get Out)' is basically a song for all girls just to declare their independence because, as I'm sure all females can relate to, boys will be boys at any age and they don't always act right. I'm not hating on the guys, but they just need to be kept in line every once in a while."

== Critical reception ==
Johnny Loftus of AllMusic noted "Leave (Get Out)" as one of the album JoJo's top tracks, writing that it "doesn't have a lot of staying power, but its guitar figure is a nice touch, and the chorus hits with the right amount of tell-off brashness." Emma Morgan of Yahoo! Music UK called it her signature song, saying that it would be "strong enough" to base a music career on, but commented that she has no identity beyond this.

== Chart performance ==
In the United States, "Leave (Get Out)" entered the Billboard Hot 100 at number 99 on April 10, 2004. The song made gradual movements up the chart, reaching the peak of number 12 on the issue dated July 31, 2004, 16 weeks after its debut. It lasted 12 more weeks on the Hot 100 and sold over 500,000 downloads, earning a gold certification by the Recording Industry Association of America (RIAA). Aside from the Hot 100, "Leave (Get Out)" managed to peak at the summit of the US Billboard Mainstream Top 40 for five consecutive weeks. It also peaked at number 33 on the Billboard Adult Top 40.

"Leave (Get Out)" became an international success, reaching top five peaks in several European and Oceanic territories. The song peaked highest in Australia, New Zealand and the United Kingdom, all at number two. In Australia, the song debuted at its peak position and lasted on the singles chart for 15 weeks, eventually shipping 75,000 units to the country and earning a platinum certification by the Australian Recording Industry Association (ARIA). In New Zealand, the song entered the singles chart at number 36. It gained momentum in its second week, moving up to number five, earning the title of the week's "Greatest Gainer". The song stalled there for three weeks and reached its peak position two weeks after, on October 18, 2004. The song sold and streamed 30,000 units in New Zealand, earning a platinum certification by Recorded Music NZ (RMNZ).

In the United Kingdom, "Leave (Get Out)" debuted and peaked at number two on the UK Singles Chart on September 5, 2004. The song stayed in the top 10 for four more weeks and fell to number 21 the following week. The song quickly exited the UK Singles Chart, after two more weeks of descending the chart. "Leave (Get Out)" debuted on the Irish Singles Chart on September 2, 2004, at number eight. It peaked at number three two weeks later on September 16, 2004, moving from number seven and earning the title of the week's "Greatest Gainer". The song stalled at its peak position for three weeks and exited the chart two weeks later.

== Music video ==
The music video, directed by Erik White and choreographed by Laurieann Gibson, takes place in a high school in California. JoJo is seen with friends in the yard, corridor and girls' bathroom. She is also seen dancing with cheerleading girlfriends, including pictures hanging on the walls with her alleged ex-boyfriend. It received heavy rotation on MTV, BET, VH1, Radio Disney and Nickelodeon. The video was nominated for Best New Artist at the 2004 MTV Video Music Awards, which made JoJo become the youngest MTV Video Music Award nominee. The video also retired on MTV's Total Request Live after spending 50 days on the countdown, including two days at No. 1, making her the youngest artist to both have a video retired and reach the summit of the chart.

== Other versions ==
In December 2018, JoJo released a re-recorded version of "Leave (Get Out)" featuring reworked vocals and production. JoJo re-recorded the song, as well as her albums JoJo and The High Road, following a dispute with Blackground Records, which blocked the song from streaming services. On March 19, 2020, JoJo uploaded a video of her singing from home a new quarantine-themed version of the song, titled "Chill (Stay In)", which featured updated lyrics encouraging self-isolation and social distancing during the COVID-19 pandemic. JoJo appeared on Tori Kelly's "QuaranTea with Tori" Instagram livestream where they performed the song together (with Kelly changing the swear words) on March 23.

In the 2024 episode "Nandor's Army" of the TV series What We Do in the Shadows, Nandor (Kayvan Novak) plays "Leave (Get Out)" for Guillermo de la Cruz (Harvey Guillén) when he wants him to leave. Songwriter Alex Cantrall's daughter Kylie Cantrall performed it on the Season 14 finale of The Masked Singer as Cat Witch. After being unmasked, Kylie acknowledged her father wrote the song with Alex being present in the audience.

== Track listings ==
- US digital EP
1. "Leave (Get Out)" (radio edit) – 4:02
2. "Leave (Get Out)" (hip hop club mix) – 3:54
3. "Leave (Get Out)" (dance mix) – 3:57
4. "Leave (Get Out)" (instrumental) – 4:03
- US CD single and Australian CD 1
1. "Leave (Get Out)" (album version) – 4:03
2. "Leave (Get Out)" (hip hop club mix) – 3:50
3. "Leave (Get Out)" (dance mix) – 3:54
4. "Leave (Get Out)" (main instrumental) – 4:04
5. "Not That Kinda Girl" – 3:28
- Australian CD 2
1. "Leave (Get Out)" (radio edit) – 4:00
2. "Leave (Get Out)" (album version) – 4:03
3. "Leave (Get Out)" (hip hop club mix) – 3:50
4. "Leave (Get Out)" (dance mix) – 3:54
5. "Leave (Get Out)" (video—Disney/Nickelodeon version)
- UK CD1
1. "Leave (Get Out)" (radio edit) – 4:00
2. "Leave (Get Out)" (dance mix) – 3:54
- UK CD2
1. "Leave (Get Out)" (radio edit) – 4:00
2. "Leave (Get Out)" (hip hop club mix) – 3:50
3. "Not That Kinda Girl" – 3:28
4. "Leave (Get Out)" (video) – 4:00
- European CD single
1. "Leave (Get Out)" (radio edit) – 3:49
2. "Leave (Get Out)" (hip hop club mix) – 3:50
- European maxi-CD single
1. "Leave (Get Out)" (radio edit) – 3:49
2. "Leave (Get Out)" (hip hop club mix) – 3:50
3. "Leave (Get Out)" (dance mix) – 3:54
4. "Leave (Get Out)" (instrumental) – 4:04

== Credits and personnel ==
Credits are adapted from the liner notes of the "Leave (Get Out)" European CD single.

=== Recording ===
- Recorded at Soulpower Studios (Los Angeles, California) and Westlake Studios (West Hollywood, California)
- Mixed at Soulpower Studios (Los Angeles, California)
- Mastered at Sony Studios (New York City, New York)

=== Personnel ===
- JoJo – vocals
- Soulshock & Karlin – production, arrangements, all instruments
- Soulshock – mixing
- Eric Jackson – guitar
- Sean Hurley – guitar
- James Cruz – mastering

== Charts ==
=== Weekly charts ===
Chart (2004)	Peak position
Australia (ARIA)	2
Australian Urban (ARIA)	1
Austria (Ö3 Austria Top 40)	16
Belgium (Ultratop 50 Flanders)	4
Belgium (Ultratop 50 Wallonia)	18
Canada CHR/Pop Top 30 (Radio & Records)	1
Canada Hot AC Top 30 (Radio & Records)	17
Czech Republic (IFPI)	11
Denmark (Tracklisten)	11
Europe (Eurochart Hot 100)	2
France (SNEP)	12
Germany (GfK)	9
Hungary (Editors' Choice Top 40)	26
Ireland (IRMA)	3
Italy (FIMI)	9
Netherlands (Dutch Top 40)	4
Netherlands (Single Top 100)	4
New Zealand (Recorded Music NZ)	2
Poland (PiF PaF)	10
Romania (Romanian Top 100)	27
Scottish Singles Sales (Official Charts)	1
Sweden (Sverigetopplistan)	30
Switzerland (Schweizer Hitparade)	5
UK Singles (Official Charts)	2
US Billboard Hot 100	12
US Adult Pop Airplay (Billboard)	33
US Dance Airplay (Billboard)	14
US Pop Airplay (Billboard)	1
US Rhythmic Airplay (Billboard)	23

Chart (2013)	Peak position
Scottish Singles Sales (Official Charts)	46
UK Singles (Official Charts)	48
UK Hip Hop/R&B (Official Charts)	9

=== Year-end charts ===
Chart (2004)	Position
Australia (ARIA)	23
Australian Urban (ARIA)	7
Belgium (Ultratop 50 Flanders)	45
Belgium (Ultratop 50 Wallonia)	95
France (SNEP)	90
Germany (Media Control GfK)	66
Netherlands (Dutch Top 40)	34
Netherlands (Single Top 100)	60
New Zealand (RIANZ)	24
Switzerland (Schweizer Hitparade)	26
UK Singles (OCC)	36
US Billboard Hot 100	40
US Adult Top 40 (Billboard)	95
US Mainstream Top 40 (Billboard)	4

== Certifications ==
Region	Certification	Certified units/sales
Australia (ARIA)	Platinum	70,000^{^}
New Zealand (RMNZ)	Platinum	30,000^{‡}
United Kingdom (BPI)	Platinum	600,000^{‡}
United States (RIAA)	Gold	500,000^{*}
^{*} Sales figures based on certification alone.^{^} Shipments figures based on certification alone.^{‡} Sales+streaming figures based on certification alone.

== Release history ==
Region	Date	Format(s)	Label(s)	Ref.
United States	February 24, 2004	CD	Da Family; Blackground	
United States	March 1, 2004	Contemporary hit; rhythmic contemporary radio	Da Family; Blackground	
Germany	June 21, 2004	CD; maxi-CD	Black Ocean	
Australia	August 23, 2004	CD 1	Universal	
United Kingdom	August 30, 2004	CD	Black Ocean; Da Family; Mercury	
Australia	October 4, 2004	CD 2	Universal	
