= JoJo (album) =

2004 studio album by JoJo

- Standard cover

Studio album by JoJo
- Released: June 22, 2004
- Recorded: 2003–2004
- Studios: Sony (New York City) (Note: Tracks 1, 3, 5, 6, 8 and 11–14); The Underlab (Los Angeles) (Note: Tracks 2 and 9); Unsung (Sherman Oaks, California) (Note: Track 4); Battery (New York City) (Note: Tracks 6 and 8); Soulpower (Los Angeles) (Note: Track 7); Westlake (West Hollywood, California); Larrabee North (Universal City, California) (Note: Track 10)
- Genres: Pop; R&B
- Length: 52:08
- Labels: Da Family; Blackground; Universal
- Producers: Bink!; Reggie Burrell; Ronald Burrell; The Co-Stars; G.P.; Vincent Herbert; Kwamé "K1 Mill"; Joanna Levesque; Mike City; Brian Morgan; Balewa Muhammad; Soulshock and Karlin; Tre Black; The Underdogs; Young Freak

JoJo chronology
JoJo (2004)	The High Road (2006)

Alternative cover
- Europe reissue and UK edition cover (Note: The original Japanese edition appears with a yellow or pink background instead of black. The Japanese limited reissue has a pink background.)

Singles from JoJo
- 1. "Leave (Get Out)" Released: February 24, 2004; 2. "Baby It's You" Released: September 6, 2004; 3. "Not That Kinda Girl" Released: February 15, 2005

JoJo is the debut studio album by American singer JoJo, released on June 22, 2004, by Da Family Entertainment, Blackground Records, and Universal Records. Incorporating pop and R&B, JoJo was influenced by Ella Fitzgerald, Bobby Brown, and Aretha Franklin. While recording the album over an eight-month period, JoJo worked with producers including Brian Alexander Morgan, Soulshock and Karlin, Mike City, Bink!, Kwamé "K1 Mill" and The Underdogs, among others. JoJo co-wrote three out of the seventeen original tracks on the album. The album also includes a cover of R&B group SWV's 1993 song "Weak".

The album was preceded by the release of JoJo's debut single, "Leave (Get Out)", which was a worldwide commercial success. In the United States, the single peaked at number 12 on the Billboard Hot 100 and topped the Pop Airplay chart, making her the youngest artist in history to do so. In the United Kingdom, the single peaked at number two. Follow-up single "Baby It's You" was released in a new version that features rapper Bow Wow and became JoJo's second top-40 entry in the United States. In the United Kingdom, the song became her second top-10 single, peaking at number eight. The album's third and final single, "Not That Kinda Girl", failed to chart in the United States, but charted moderately in Australia and Germany.

The album debuted and peaked at number four on the US Billboard 200, selling 95,000 copies in its first week. It was certified platinum by the Recording Industry Association of America (RIAA) on November 15, 2004, denoting US sales in excess of one million copies. In Canada, the album was also certified platinum. In the United Kingdom and Germany, the album was certified gold. The album has sold over three million copies worldwide.

JoJo was mainly promoted through live, televised performances; JoJo appeared on On Air with Ryan Seacrest and performed at the 2004 Kids' Choice Awards. Alongside other artists, JoJo was part of the Cingular Buddy Bash Tour and she was also the opening act on the European leg of Usher's Truth Tour. Citing the album's unavailability on streaming services, JoJo released a re-recorded version of JoJo on December 21, 2018. On September 24, 2021, Blackground Records released the original version of JoJo to streaming services and digital platforms.

== Background ==
As a child, JoJo listened as her mother practiced hymns. She started singing when she was two years and three months old by imitating, to R&B, jazz, and soul tunes. On the A&E show Child Stars III: Teen Rockers, her mother claimed that JoJo had a borderline genius IQ. As a child, JoJo enjoyed attending Native American festivals and acted locally in professional theaters.

At age seven, JoJo appeared on the television show Kids Say the Darnedest Things: On the Road in Boston with American comedian and actor Bill Cosby and she sang a song from singer Cher. After auditioning in the television show Destination Stardom, JoJo sang Aretha Franklin's songs "Respect" and "Chain of Fools". Soon after, The Oprah Winfrey Show contacted her, inviting her to perform. She performed on Maury, on one of the frequent "kids-with-talent" episodes, as well as many others. Reminiscing, she has stated that "when it came to performing, I just had no fear".

At age six, JoJo was offered a record deal, but her mother turned it down because she believed JoJo was too young for a music career. After appearing on talk shows and the McDonald's Gospel Fest performing Whitney Houston's "I Believe in You and Me" and competing on the television show America's Most Talented Kids, but did not win the show and lost to Diana DeGarmo. Record producer Vincent Herbert contacted her and asked her to audition for Blackground Records. During her audition for Barry Hankerson, Hankerson told her that the spirit of his niece, the late singer Aaliyah, had brought her to him. She was signed to the label, and had recording sessions with famed producers like The Underdogs and Soulshock and Karlin.

JoJo's live demo, Joanna Levesque, recorded in 2001, features covers of soul and R&B songs, including Wilson Pickett's "Mustang Sally" (1966), Etta James' "It Ain't Always What You Do (It's Who You Let See You Do It)" (1989), Aretha Franklin's "Chain of Fools" (1968) and "The House That Jack Built" (1969), The Moonglows' "See Saw" (1956), Stevie Wonder's "Superstition" (1972), and The Temptations' "Shakey Ground" (1975). In 2003, at age 12, JoJo signed with Blackground Records and Da Family and begin working with some producers on her first album.

== Composition ==
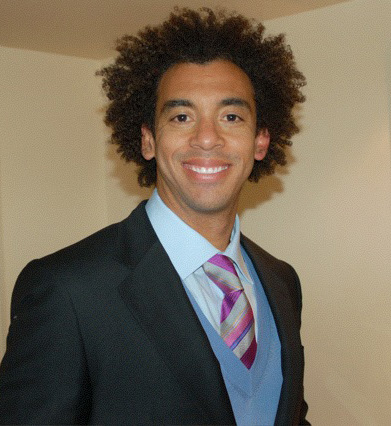
Harvey Mason Jr. co-wrote and co-produced "Baby It's You" and "Never Say Goodbye" for the album.

The music found on JoJo is primarily pop and R&B. During an interview about the album's composition, JoJo stated, "I wrote three songs on the album. I am not the [kind of] person who sings something that I have no reference point to. I feel like I am a real artist and I want to be able to feel what I am singing about. So when I sing, "Leave (Get Out)," I have been through that. I think it is just a new generation, whether people are ready for it or not. Teenagers are dating. They go through things and that is really what it is about." JoJo stated, "I listened to everyone from Aretha Franklin to Bob Seager, to the Beatles, but I have to say that my mom is probably my biggest influence. She really has a great voice." JoJo also listed singer Beyoncé as a major influence, stating, "I think she is the perfect example of a strong woman and just a talented person. She's a songwriter, she's a dancer and she's an incredible singer and I don't think anyone can touch her right now."

== Release ==
=== Singles ===
The album's lead single, "Leave (Get Out)", was released on February 24, 2004, as a physical copy and for radio airplay. The song became an instant success for JoJo, reaching the top 10 in 11 different countries. In the United States, the single peaked at number 12 on the Billboard Hot 100 and topped the Mainstream Top 40 chart. The single was even more successful internationally, peaking at number two on the UK Singles Chart and on the European Hot 100 Singles, as well as in Australia and New Zealand. It also reached the top five in Belgium, Ireland, the Netherlands, and Switzerland, and the top 10 in Germany and Italy. The accompanying music video, directed by Erik White, takes place in a high school. JoJo is seen with friends and dancing with cheerleading girls. The video was nominated for Best New Artist at the 2004 MTV Video Music Awards, which made JoJo become the youngest MTV Video Music Award nominee.

"Baby It's You" was released as the album's second single on September 6, 2004. The album version of the song is performed by JoJo herself, while the version released as a single features Bow Wow. Although it failed to match the success of its predecessor, the song was successful in many countries. In the United States, the single became her second top-40 entry on the Billboard Hot 100, peaking at number 22. The single's highest peak position was at number three in New Zealand, becoming her second single to chart that high. In the United Kingdom, the single also became her second top-10 entry, reaching a peak of number eight. The single also had similar chart success in countries such as Australia, Austria, Belgium, and Denmark.

"Not That Kinda Girl" was released as the album's third and final single on February 15, 2005. The single received a limited release, only receiving minimal airplay in the United States. Due to lack of a physical CD in many countries, the single was a commercial failure. It did, however, manage to chart at number 52 in Australia and number 85 in Germany. The music video was directed by the team of Eric Williams and Randy Marshall, known as Fat Cats, and was shot in Los Angeles. It premiered on MTV's Total Request Live on March 24, 2005. It spent only four days on the countdown and did not climb higher than number eight.

=== Promotion ===
JoJo promoted the album mainly through live performances. JoJo performed "Leave (Get Out)" at the 2004 Teen Choice Awards and on the television shows On Air with Ryan Seacrest and Top of the Pops. She performed the song live for Yahoo! Music, which was posted on their official website. JoJo also performed several songs from the album on Sessions@AOL which was later released as a digital EP.

Prior to the album's release, JoJo embarked on the Cingular Buddy Bash Tour with pop rock singer Fefe Dobson, hip hop duo Young Gunz and rap metal band Zebrahead. The tour stopped at nine malls, beginning at Atlanta's Northlake Mall and ending at South Shore Plaza. That year, she was requested by First Lady Laura Bush to perform at the 2004 Christmas in Washington special, broadcast by TNT and hosted by Dr. Phil and his wife Robin McGraw.

== Critical reception ==
Professional ratings
Review scores
Source	Rating
AllMusic	3.5/5 stars
Blender	3/5 stars
Entertainment Weekly	B
Now	2/5 Ns
Slant Magazine	2/5 stars
USA Today	2.5/4 stars
Yahoo! Music UK	6/10 stars

JoJo received generally mixed reviews from music critics. Johnny Loftus of AllMusic called the album "a strong debut," highlighting JoJo's "tremendous voice" and commending the production for keeping the focus on her performances. He also praised the album's lack of guest features and skits, concluding that JoJo was "served well by the mix of arrangements and backgrounds" and that her singing pointed to her future potential. Raymond Fiore from Entertainment Weekly similarly praised the album's "sizzling hooks" and highlighted tracks such as "Happy Song," while noting that JoJo's "vocal calisthenics quickly grow tiresome." He concluded that "with a few more years under her belt JoJo may yet discover her inner soul singer." Elysa Gardner of USA Today awarded the album two-and-a-half out of four stars, describing JoJo's singing as "lithe" and "tender" and suggesting that, unlike some of her vocal influences, her performances were less ostentatious. Gardner felt that songs such as "Breezy" and "Leave (Get Out)" benefited from this approach, while noting that the singer's youth was apparent in the album's romantic themes. Writing for Blender, Joseph Patel praised JoJo's performances on "Happy Song" and "City Lights," describing her as "wise" and "charming" when she stayed within her vocal range and embraced her adolescent innocence. However, he felt that many of the album's more mature R&B tracks were less convincing, arguing that JoJo was "neither refined nor old enough" to convincingly portray an R&B seductress. Patel singled out "City Lights" as the album's standout track.

Other critics were less favorable. Slant Magazine's Sal Cinquemani called the album "contrived and calculated" and arguing that even JoJo's self-written songs failed to give it a distinct personality. However, he praised "City Lights" and "The Happy Song" for allowing her vocals to take center stage, suggesting that she "could very well be the next Teena Marie" if paired with stronger material. Yahoo! Music critic Emma Morgan also gave the album a mixed assessment, criticizing its heavy studio production and arguing that JoJo had "no identity to speak of" beyond the success of "Leave (Get Out)." While acknowledging her talent and describing the single as "solid enough to base a career on," she concluded that JoJo was "a prodigy without purpose." Writing for Blender, Joseph Patel praised JoJo's performances on "Happy Song" and "City Lights," describing her as "wise" and "charming" when she stayed within her vocal range and embraced her adolescent innocence. However, he felt that many of the album's more mature R&B tracks were less convincing, arguing that JoJo was "neither refined nor old enough" to convincingly portray an R&B seductress. Patel singled out "City Lights" as the album's standout track. Jason Richards of Now offered a negative assessment, describing the record as a "typical pop/R&B album" and criticizing its mature themes in light of JoJo's young age. While acknowledging the involvement of established producers, he characterized the album as "pure poison in a sweet candy shell."

== Commercial performance ==
JoJo debuted at number four on the Billboard 200, selling 95,000 copies in its first week. The album was certified platinum by the Recording Industry Association of America (RIAA) on November 15, 2004, for sales exceeding one million copies. As of October 2006 the album has sold 1.3 million copies according to Nielsen Soundscan. In Canada the album reached number 23 on the Canadian Albums Chart and was certified Platinum by Music Canada for shipments in excess of 100,000 copies.

In the United Kingdom, the album debuted and peaked at number 23 on the UK Albums Chart, and was certified gold by the British Phonographic Industry (BPI) on November 5, 2004, denoting shipments in excess of 100,000 copies. It debuted and peaked at number 52 in Germany, eventually receiving a gold certification by the Bundesverband Musikindustrie (BVMI). Despite the success of "Leave (Get Out)" in Australia, the album only managed to chart as high as number 86 on the ARIA Albums Chart. Elsewhere, JoJo reached the top 30 in Japan, Portugal, and Switzerland, the top 40 in New Zealand, the top 50 in Italy, and the top 70 in France and Ireland. As of August 2015, the album had sold over three million copies worldwide.

The 2018 reissue reached number 13 on Billboard's R&B Album Sales chart and number 41 on the R&B/Hip-Hop Album Sales chart for the issue dated January 5, 2019.

== Track listing ==
Standard edition
No.	Title	Writer(s)	Producer(s)	Length
1.	"Breezy"	Kwamé Holland; Balewa Muhammad; Sylvester Jordan Jr.; Thom Bell; Roland Chambers; Kenny Gamble	Kwamé "K1 Mill"	3:15
2.	"Baby It's You"	Harvey Mason Jr.; Damon Thomas; Eric Dawkins; Antonio Dixon	The Underdogs	3:11
3.	"Not That Kinda Girl"	Neely Dinkins; B. Cola Pietro; Muhammad; Jordan	The Co-Stars; Muhammad	3:27
4.	"The Happy Song"	Mike City	Mike City	3:59
5.	"Homeboy"	Roosevelt Harrell III; Muhammad; Jordan; Vincent Herbert; Ritchie Adams; Mark Barkan	Bink!	3:35
6.	"City Lights"	Reggie Burrell; Ronald Burrell; Herbert; Stephen Garrett	Reggie Burrell; Ronald Burrell; Herbert	4:54
7.	"Leave (Get Out)"	Soulshock; Kenneth Karlin; Alex Cantrall; Phillip "Silky" White	Soulshock and Karlin	4:02
8.	"Use My Shoulder"	Reggie Burrell; Ronald Burrell; Garrett; David Conley; Bernard Jackson; David Townsend	Reggie Burrell; Ronald Burrell; Herbert	3:43
9.	"Never Say Goodbye"	Mason; Thomas; Dawkins; Dixon	The Underdogs	3:51
10.	"Weak"	Brian Morgan	Morgan; Herbert^{[a]}; Dexter Simmons^{[a]}	4:50
11.	"Keep On Keepin' On"	Joanna Levesque	G.P.^{[b]}; Young Freak^{[b]}; Levesque^{[b]}	3:15
12.	"Sunshine"	Herbert; Levesque; Tremain Saunders	Herbert; Tre Black	3:07
13.	"Yes or No"	Herbert; Levesque; Saunders; Reggie Burrell; Ronald Burrell	Herbert; Tre Black	3:14
14.	"Fairy Tales"	Herbert; Saunders; Nastacia Kendall	Herbert; Tre Black	3:45
Total length:				52:08

Japanese exclusive edition
No.	Title	Writer(s)	Producer(s)	Length
15.	"Back and Forth"	Herbert; Saunders; Brian Reeves	Herbert; Tre Black	3:29
16.	"Baby It's You" (featuring Bow Wow)	Mason; Thomas; Dawkins; Dixon	The Underdogs	3:35
17.	"Leave (Get Out)" (Hip Hop Club Mix)	Soulshock; Karlin; Cantrell; White	Soulshock and Karlin	4:02
18.	"Leave (Get Out)" (music video)

German edition and European VIP edition (Disc 1)
No.	Title	Writer(s)	Producer(s)	Length
1.	"Butterflies"	Herbert; Saunders; Kendall	Herbert; Tre Black	2:43
16.	"Back and Forth"	Herbert; Saunders; Brian Reeves	Herbert; Tre Black	3:29

European reissue, UK edition and Japanese limited reissue^{[c]}
No.	Title	Writer(s)	Producer(s)	Length
17.	"Baby It's You" (featuring Bow Wow)	Mason; Thomas; Dawkins; Dixon	The Underdogs	3:35

European VIP edition (Disc 2)
No.	Title	Length
1.	"Leave (Get Out)" (Radio Edit)	4:03
2.	"Leave (Get Out)" (Hip Hop Club Mix)	3:54
3.	"Leave (Get Out)" (Dance Mix)	3:57
4.	"Leave (Get Out)" (Instrumental)	4:04
5.	"Baby It's You" (Single Mix)	3:13
6.	"Baby It's You" (Hip Hop Remix)	3:42
7.	"Baby It's You" (DJ Volume Radio Edit)	3:26
8.	"Baby It's You" (DJ Volume Extended Mix)	6:44
9.	"Not That Kinda Girl" (Mavix Mix)	3:37
10.	"Not That Kinda Girl" (CPH Remix)	3:51
11.	"Not That Kinda Girl" (Funky Angelz Remix)	3:34
12.	"Leave (Get Out)" (video)
13.	"Baby It's You" (video; featuring Bow Wow)
14.	"Not That Kinda Girl" (video)
15.	"JoJo E.P.K." (video)

Special limited edition bonus AVCD
No.	Title	Writer(s)	Producer(s)	Length
1.	"Leave (Get Out)" (video)
2.	"Baby It's You" (video; featuring Bow Wow)
3.	"Not That Kinda Girl" (video)
4.	"Baby It's You" (radio edit; featuring Bow Wow)	Mason; Thomas; Dawkins; Dixon	The Underdogs	3:35
5.	"Secret Love" (from the original soundtrack of Shark Tale)	Jared Gosselin; White; Samantha Gibbs	Gosselin; White	3:58

=== Notes ===
- ^{^[a]} signifies an additional producer.
- ^{^[b]} signifies a co-producer.
- ^{^[c]} The track list for the Japan limited reissue is the exact same as the European reissue and UK edition with the only difference being that the track "Butterflies" is placed as track 15 for the Japan release and is listed as a bonus track.

=== Sample credits ===
- "Breezy" contains replayed elements from "Something for Nothing" by MFSB.
- "Homeboy" contains elements from "Chasing Me into Somebody Else's Arms" by Scherrie Payne.
- "Use My Shoulder" contains replayed elements from "Happy" by Surface.

== Personnel ==
Credits were adapted from the liner notes.

=== Musicians ===
- JoJo – vocals
- The Underdogs – all music (tracks 2, 9)
- Bink! – all music, programming (track 5)
- Soulshock and Karlin – arrangement, all instruments (track 7)
- Eric Jackson – guitar (track 7)
- Sean Hurley – guitar (track 7)
- Michael Thompson – guitar (track 9)

=== Technical ===
- Kwamé "K1 Mill" – production (track 1)
- Eric Schlotzer – recording (tracks 1, 3, 5, 6, 8, 10–14)
- Jermaine Fray – recording assistance (tracks 1, 3, 5, 6, 8, 11–14)
- Dexter Simmons – mixing (tracks 1, 3–6, 8, 10–14); additional production (track 10)
- Vincent Herbert – mixing (tracks 1, 3–6, 8, 10, 12–14); production (tracks 6, 8, 12–14); additional production (track 10); executive production
- Donnie Whittemore – mixing assistance (tracks 1, 3–6, 8, 10–14)
- The Underdogs – production (tracks 2, 9)
- Dave "Natural Love" Russell – recording, editing, mixing (tracks 2, 9)
- Dabling "Hobby Boy" Harward – recording, editing (tracks 2, 9)
- Kevin Mahoney – recording assistance, editing assistance (tracks 2, 9)
- The Co-Stars – production (track 3)
- Balewa Muhammad – production (track 3)
- Franny Graham – recording (track 4)
- Mike City – production (track 4)
- Bink! – production (track 5)
- Reggie Burrell – production (tracks 6, 8)
- Ronald Burrell – production (tracs 6, 8)
- Soulshock and Karlin – production (track 7)
- Soulshock – mixing (track 7)
- Brian Morgan – production (track 10)
- G.P. – co-production (track 11)
- Young Freak – co-production (track 11)
- Joanna Levesque – co-production (track 11)
- Tre Black – production (tracks 12–14)
- Barry Hankerson – executive production
- Jomo Hankerson – executive production
- Gene Grimaldi – mastering

=== Artwork ===
- Stacey "Swade" Wade – art direction, design, photography
- Thomas Delisle – photography

== Charts ==
=== Weekly charts ===
Chart (2004–2005)	Peak position
Australian Albums (ARIA)	86
Australian Urban Albums (ARIA)	13
Canadian Albums (Nielsen SoundScan)	23
Canadian R&B Albums (Nielsen SoundScan)	7
French Albums (SNEP)	62
German Albums (Offizielle Top 100)	54
Irish Albums (IRMA)	70
Italian Albums (FIMI)	44
Japanese Albums (Oricon)	30
New Zealand Albums (RMNZ)	36
Portuguese Albums (AFP)	30
Scottish Albums (Official Charts)	32
Swiss Albums (Schweizer Hitparade)	30
UK Albums (Official Charts)	22
UK R&B Albums (Official Charts)	8
US Billboard 200	4
US Top R&B/Hip-Hop Albums (Billboard)	10

=== Year-end charts ===
Chart (2004)	Position
UK Albums (OCC)	92
US Billboard 200	84

Chart (2005)	Position
US Billboard 200	132
US Top R&B/Hip-Hop Albums (Billboard)	95

== Certifications ==
Region	Certification	Certified units/sales
Canada (Music Canada)	Platinum	100,000^{^}
Germany (BVMI)	Gold	100,000^{^}
United Kingdom (BPI)	Gold	100,000^{^}
United States (RIAA)	Platinum	1,000,000^{^}
^{^} Shipments figures based on certification alone.

== Release history ==
Region	Date	Edition	Label	Ref.
United States	June 22, 2004	Standard	Da Family; Blackground; Universal	
Canada	June 29, 2004	Standard	Universal	
Germany	July 19, 2004	Standard	Black Ocean; Edel	
United Kingdom	September 6, 2004	Standard	Mercury	
Australia	October 4, 2004	Standard	Universal	
Japan	October 21, 2004	Standard	Universal	
Various	December 21, 2018	Re-recording	Clover Music	
Various	September 24, 2021	Standard (streaming)	Blackground	

== JoJo (Clover Room Edition) ==
JoJo (Clover Room Edition)

Studio album (Re-recorded) by JoJo
- Released: December 21, 2018
- Recorded: 2018
- Length: 51:53
- Label: Clover Music

JoJo chronology
Mad Love (2016)	JoJo (Clover Room Edition) (2018)	The High Road (2018) (2018)

On December 20, 2018, JoJo re-recorded JoJo, along with her second album The High Road and singles "Demonstrate" and "Disaster", released under JoJo's new label imprint Clover Music on December 21. The decision to re-record the singles and albums came from the removal of all of JoJo's original music released under Blackground Records from streaming and digital selling platforms.

Blackground owns the master licensing to the original recordings and has control over their release. JoJo sought after getting the original songs and albums back online, but would never come to an agreement with the label. JoJo's lawyer stated they had reached the end of the statute of limitations on the re-record clause which gave her the rights to "cover" her own music.

Despite the releases of the original versions of JoJo and The High Road on digital and streaming platforms in 2021, JoJo stated that she does not benefit financially from the releases, and encourages fans to support the re-recorded versions instead.

=== Track listing ===
All tracks are noted as "Clover Room Edition".

No.	Title	Writer(s)	Producer(s)	Length
1.	"Breezy"	Holland; Muhammad; Jordan; Bell; Chambers; Gamble	Kwamé "K1 Mill"; Klynik^{[a]}	3:15
2.	"Baby It's You"	Mason; Thomas; Dawkins; Dixon	The Underdogs; Klynik^{[a]}	3:11
3.	"Not That Kinda Girl"	Dinkins; Pietro; Muhammad; Jordan	The Co-Stars; Muhammad; Jordan XL^{[a]}	3:27
4.	"The Happy Song"	Mike City	Mike City; Jordan XL^{[a]}	3:59
5.	"Homeboy"	Harrell; Muhammad; Jordan; Herbert; Adams; Barkan	Bink!; Klynik^{[a]}	3:35
6.	"City Lights"	Reggie Burrell; Ronald Burrell; Herbert; Garrett	Reggie Burrell; Ronald Burrell; Herbert; Klynik^{[a]}	4:54
7.	"Leave (Get Out)"	Soulshock; Karlin; Cantrell; White	Soulshock and Karlin; Klynik^{[a]}	4:02
8.	"Use My Shoulder"	Reggie Burrell; Ronald Burrell; Garrett; Conley; Jackson; Townsend	Reggie Burrell; Ronald Burrell; Herbert	3:43
9.	"Never Say Goodbye"	Mason; Thomas; Dawkins; Dixon	The Underdogs; Jordan XL^{[a]}	3:51
10.	"Weak"	Morgan	Morgan; Herbert^{[a]}; Dexter Simmons^{[a]}; Klynik^{[a]}	4:50
11.	"Keep On Keepin' On"	Levesque	G.P.^{[b]}; Young Freak^{[b]}; Levesque^{[b]}; Jordan XL^{[a]}	3:00
12.	"Sunshine"	Herbert; Levesque; Saunders	Herbert; Tre Black; Jordan XL^{[a]}	3:07
13.	"Yes or No"	Herbert; Levesque; Saunders; Reggie Burrell; Ronald Burrell	Herbert; Tre Black; Jordan XL^{[a]}	3:14
14.	"Fairy Tales"	Herbert; Saunders; Kendall	Herbert; Tre Black; Jordan XL^{[a]}	3:45
Total length:				51:53

=== Charts ===
Chart (2019)	Peak position
US R&B/Hip-Hop Album Sales (Billboard)	41
US R&B Album Sales (Billboard)	13
