= Beau Dozier =

American songwriter and record producer (1979–2025)

Background information
- Born: Beau Alexandrè Dozier; November 26, 1979; Los Angeles, California, U.S.
- Died: March 2025 (aged 45)
- Genres: Pop; R&B; pop rock; dance-pop; electropop; hip hop
- Occupations: Musician; record producer; songwriter; composer; television producer
- Instruments: Piano; drum kit; bass guitar; electronic keyboard
- Years active: 1986–2025

Beau Alexandrè Dozier (November 26, 1979 – March 2025) was an American songwriter, record producer, multi-instrumentalist, and television producer who worked with chart-topping artists of many different genres including Tupac Shakur, Snoop Dogg, Priscilla Ahn, Boyz II Men, The Backstreet Boys, Sir Cliff Richard, and Jennifer Lopez. Dozier was best known for his work developing new pop and R&B talent which led to his role as a producer on American Idol.

== Life and career ==
=== Early life ===
Dozier was born in Los Angeles, California, and was introduced to music at a young age. His father, Lamont Dozier (1941 – 2022), who was best known as a member of the Motown songwriting and production team, Holland–Dozier–Holland and mother, film executive Barbara Ullman, encouraged Dozier to follow his passion for music early in life. At the age of four, Dozier started playing the drums and composing music on the piano.

=== Early career ===
At the age of seven, Dozier co-wrote and composed the song "I Cry for You" for Ben E. King which appeared on the album Save the Last Dance for Me and on Lamont Dozier's album Going Back to My Roots (The Anthology).In 1993 at the age of thirteen Dozier, also known as Lil' Beau in the hip-hop and DJ world, was signed by Irving Azoff to a record deal with Giant Records. During his time on Giant Records he was featured as an artist and producer on records with west coast rappers Snoop Dogg, Xzibit, Kurupt, Daz Dillinger, Ice-T, King T and Tha Alkaholiks. Dozier was featured on Bad Azz's records "Tha Last Time" and "Too Many Choices". He was also featured as an artist on C-Style Presents 19th Street LBC Compilation on a song he produced called "Paper Chase" as well as producing The 19 Street Records' "Straight Outta Cali" compilation which featured Snoop Dogg, Kurupt, Daz Dillinger, Nate Dogg, Jayo Felony, Tha Dogg Pound, MC Eiht, Crooked I, Bad Azz, Tray Deee, and the group The Dove Shack.

=== Producing and artist development ===
In 1999, Dozier established Beautown Entertainment and began developing artists in the pop music and R&B genres. He wrote and produced records for artists including Christina Milian, The Backstreet Boys, B2K, Boyz To Men, Blaque, Tynisha Keli, Nivea, 3LW, Tiffany Evans, PYT, JC Chasez, Samantha Jade, and Nikki Flores.

Dozier composed and produced the single "Anything" for pop music artist JoJo and "Lie About Us" for Nicole Scherzinger of The Pussycat Dolls. Dozier also wrote and produced the number one single "Kryptonite" for Australian Idol winner Guy Sebastian. He wrote Joss Stone's single "Spoiled" and also produced two Gap Commercials featuring a cover of "Night Time is the Right Time", and an orchestra rendition of The Beach Boys' "God Only Knows". He also produced the theme song for The Fantastic Four written by Pink.

Dozier also collaborated with Ron Fair on his act Prima J and produced the Much Music Award-winning single for Girlicious. Beau Co-wrote "Why Ask Why" for Vanessa Hudgens with Dr. Luke. Dozier also produced and co-wrote "Yesterday" for the Pussycat Dolls' Ashley Roberts. Dozier collaborated with the Nick Ashford and Valerie Simpson on songs for the British pop singer Sir Cliff Richard's album Soulicious. Dozier also produced the Disney Music Award-winning song, "Me and My Girls", by Fifth Harmony. and produced the song "I Wish I Didn't Know" for recording artist Nelly.

In 2011, American Idol hired Dozier as Consulting Producer to develop pop music artists for the show. He also taught a class at University of Southern California on music, creativity and technology.

He continued to work with chart topping artists and producers such as Beyoncé, Jennifer Lopez, Jhené Aiko, Bonnie McKee, Dr. Luke, Nasri Atweh, Julian Bunetta, Fifth Harmony, Phillip Phillips and Jessica Sanchez.

=== Death ===
On March 8, 2025, it was announced that Dozier had died at the age of 45.

=== Personal life ===
Dozier has one daughter, Dawson Soleil.

== Discography ==
=== Songwriter/producer ===
- Boyz II Men
  - "Lovin' You"
- Nivea - Love Don't Cost a Thing Soundtrack
  - "Exgirlfriend"
- Jhene Aiko
  - "Deja Vu"
- J. Cole - 2014 Forest Hills Drive (10th Anniversary Edition)
  - "Winter Wonderland"
- B2K
  - "Your Girl Chose Me"
- Samantha Jade
  - "I'm in Hate with You"
  - "End of the World"
- Backstreet Boys
  - "Love Is"
- Jonathan McDaniel
  - "It's All About J"
  - "Lil' J Took My Girl"
- Jonathan McDaniel - Pootie Tang Soundtrack
  - "You Know What?"
- Tynisha Keli
  - "Conversations with God"
  - "Even If It Takes Forever"
  - "Work It Out"
  - "Rose in the Ghetto"
  - "Hey DJ"
  - "Downtown"
  - "Mr. New Guy"
- Nikki Flores
  - "Get You Out of My Heart"
- Bad Azz - Word on tha Streets
- Bad Azz - Personal Business
  - "Too Many Choices"
- 3LW
  - "Leave Wit You (I Think I Wanna)"
  - "Crazy"
  - "Be Like That"
  - "More Than Friends
  - "Uh Oh"
  - "Xmas in tha Hood"
  - "Naughty on Xmas"
  - "Ahh Hell Nah"
  - "Do You Ever"
  - "That's What's Up"
- C-Style Presents 19th Street LBC Compilation
  - "Paper Chase"
- PYT
  - "Same Ol' Same Ol'"
- Ben E. King - Save the Last Dance for Me
  - "I Cry for You"
- Fifth Harmony - Better Together
  - "Me and My Girls"
- Joss Stone - Fantastic Four Soundtrack
  - "What Ever Happened to the Heroes" (end titles track)
- Joss Stone - "Mind Body and Soul"
  - "Spoiled"
- Joss Stone
  - “God Only Knows"
- Joss Stone
  - "The Night Time Is the Right Time"
- Joss Stone
  - "Under Pressure" - Queen tribute
- Guy Sebastian - So Fresh: The Hits of Autumn 2005
  - "Kryptonite"
- BoA - "My Name"
  - "Feel Me"
- Avant featuring Nicole Scherzinger (The Pussycat Dolls)
  - "Lie About Us"
- Phillip Phillips - American Idol Season 11: Highlights
- JoJo - "The High Road"
  - "Do Whatcha Gotta Do"
  - "Anything"
- JoJo – Can't Take That Away from Me
  - "When Does It Go Away"
- Girlicious – Girlicious
  - "Stupid Sh@!"
- Girlicious – Rebuilt
  - "Face the Light"
  - "Grinding"
  - "Wake Up"
- Cliff Richard - Soulicious
  - "Go On and Tell Him"
  - "Do You Ever"
  - "Every Piece of My Broken Heart"
  - "How We Get Down"
  - "Saving a Life"
- Vanessa Hudgens – Identified
  - "Don't Ask Why"
- Prima J – Prima J
  - "Go Hard"
  - "Flip the Script"
- Keke Palmer
  - "Stuck On You"
- Tiffany Evans
  - "Who I Am"
  - "Can't Walk Away"
  - "Favorite Broken Heart"
- Hush
  - "Real T.V."
- Sarai Howard
  - "Swear"
- Vi3 w/ Da Brat
  - "Turn It Up"
- Rama Duke
  - "I'd Have to Lie"
  - "Always Let You Down"
  - "Wish I Never Let You"
