= Baby It's You (JoJo song) =

2004 single by JoJo

Single by JoJo featuring Bow Wow

from the album JoJo
- B-side: "Leave (Get Out)"
- Released: September 6, 2004
- Studio: The Underlab (Los Angeles, California)
- Length: 3:11
- Label: Da Family; Blackground
- Songwriters: Harvey Mason Jr.; Damon Thomas; Eric Dawkins; Antonio Dixon
- Producer: The Underdogs

JoJo singles chronology
"Leave (Get Out)" (2004)	"Baby It's You" (2004)	"Not That Kinda Girl" (2005)

Bow Wow singles chronology
"My Baby" (2003)	"Baby It's You" (2004)	"Let Me Hold You" (2005)

"Baby It's You" is a song by American recording artist JoJo, featuring American rapper Bow Wow. Written by Harvey Mason, Jr., Damon Thomas, Eric Dawkins and Antonio Dixon, and produced by the Underdogs, the song was released in September 2004 as the second single from JoJo's self-titled debut album. It reached number 22 on the US Billboard Hot 100, peaked at number eight on the UK Singles Chart, number three in New Zealand, and entered the top 40 in eight additional countries.

== Song information ==
The single version of "Baby It's You", which can be found on the UK and Japanese pressings of the JoJo album, features Bow Wow. In 2005, actress Alyson Stoner recorded a cover of "Baby It's You".

== Music video ==
The video was directed by Erik White on location at Six Flags Magic Mountain and Hurricane Harbor. Most of the performance shots were filmed in front of the Center Ring gaming area and other shots feature the ProSlide Tornado, Scream and Colossus roller coasters. It premiered on MTV's Total Request Live September 7, peaked as high as No.4 and lasted 23 days on the countdown, and also on BET's 106 & Park on September 21.

== Track listings ==
UK CD1

1. "Baby It's You" (featuring Bow Wow) – 3:36
2. "Baby It's You" (Full Phat Street mix) – 3:28

UK CD2 and Australian CD single

1. "Baby It's You" (featuring Bow Wow) – 3:36
2. "Baby It's You" (Full Phat Street mix) – 3:28
3. "Leave (Get Out)" (Copenhaniacs remix) – 3:50
4. "Leave (Get Out)" (Funky Angelz remix) – 4:15
5. "Baby It's You" (video featuring Bow Wow) – 3:39

European CD single

1. "Baby It's You" (featuring Bow Wow) – 3:41
2. "Baby It's You" – 3:15

German Pock It! CD single

1. "Baby It's You" (featuring Bow Wow)
2. "Leave (Get Out)" (album version)

== Charts ==
=== Weekly charts ===
Chart (2004–2005)	Peak position
Australia (ARIA)	16
Austria (Ö3 Austria Top 40)	41
Belgium (Ultratop 50 Flanders)	41
Belgium (Ultratip Bubbling Under Wallonia)	13
Canada CHR/Pop Top 30 (Radio & Records)	8
Czech Republic (IFPI)	30
Denmark (Tracklisten)	15
Germany (GfK)	15
Ireland (IRMA)	13
Netherlands (Dutch Top 40)	34
Netherlands (Single Top 100)	36
New Zealand (Recorded Music NZ)	3
Romania (Romanian Top 100)	49
Scotland Singles (OCC)	12
Sweden (Sverigetopplistan)	50
Switzerland (Schweizer Hitparade)	14
UK Singles (OCC)	8
US Billboard Hot 100	22
US Pop Airplay (Billboard)	7
US Rhythmic Airplay (Billboard)	16

=== Year-end charts ===
Chart (2004)	Position
US Mainstream Top 40 (Billboard)	84
US Rhythmic Top 40 (Billboard)	95

Chart (2005)	Position
US Mainstream Top 40 (Billboard)	69

== Certifications ==
Region	Certification	Certified units/sales
Australia (ARIA)	Gold	35,000^{^}
New Zealand (RMNZ)	Platinum	30,000^{‡}
United States (RIAA)	Gold	500,000^{*}
^{*} Sales figures based on certification alone.^{^} Shipments figures based on certification alone.^{‡} Sales+streaming figures based on certification alone.

== Release history ==
Region	Date	Format(s)	Label(s)	Ref.
United States	September 6, 2004	Da Family; Blackground; Universal	Contemporary hit radio; rhythmic contemporary radio	
Germany	October 4, 2004	Black Ocean; Da Family	CD single; Pock It! CD single	
United Kingdom	November 15, 2004	Black Ocean; Da Family; Mercury	CD single	
Australia	November 29, 2004	Black Ocean; Da Family; Mercury	CD single	
