= Bruce A. Carbonari =

American businessman

Bruce A. Carbonari is an American corporate businessman. He was born in 1956 and hold a BA (Finance and Accounting) from Boston College, and a Master's in Management Science from Rensselaer Polytechnic Institute. He lives in Chicago with his wife.

== Career ==
Carbonari began his career at PricewaterhouseCoopers then moved to Stanadyne in 1981. Cabonari began working for Fortune Brands in 1990. Fortune (then called MasterBrands, later American Brands) purchased Moen and Carbonari took control. He held various other positions within Fortune Brands, including president and chief operating officer, as well as chairman and chief executive officer of Fortune Brands Home & Hardware LLC. He was the chairman of the board and chief executive officer of the Fortune Brands holding company from October 2008 to 2012 when he retired. During his chairmanship at Fortune Brands, the company revenue doubled to over $4.5 billion. The holding company's divisions included tobacco, insurance and hardware. Also sporting goods and liquor which were sold during his time in charge. In March 2012, Fortune Brands Inc. split its remaining businesses and CEO Bruce Carbonari doubled his compensation from $11.2 million to $23.3 million, including a salary of $1.2 million.

He joined the board of directors of RPM International, Inc. in 2002 and continues in that position. He became an Executive Advisor Partner with Wind Point Partners a private equity firm.
