= Not That Kinda Girl =

Single by JoJo

from the album JoJo
- Released: February 15, 2005
- Studio: Sony, New York City
- Genre: Pop; R&B
- Length: 3:27
- Label: Universal
- Songwriters: Neely Dinkins; B. Cola Pietro; Balewa Muhammad; Sylvester Jordan Jr.
- Producers: The Co-Stars; Balewa Muhammad

JoJo singles chronology
"Baby It's You" (2004)	"Not That Kinda Girl" (2005)	"Too Little Too Late" (2006)

Audio sample
- Not That Kinda Girl: file; help

"Not That Kinda Girl" is a song by American singer JoJo from her self-titled debut studio album (2004). It was written by Neely Dinkins, B. Cola Pietro, Balewa Muhammad, and Sylvester Jordan Jr. The song was released on February 15, 2005, as the album's third and final single. "Not That Kinda Girl" received a commercial release solely in Australia and Germany, where it charted at numbers 52 and 85, respectively.

== Music video ==
The music video was directed by the team of Eric Williams and Randy Marshall, known as Fat Cats, and was shot in Los Angeles in early February 2005. It premiered on MTV's Total Request Live on March 24, 2005. It spent only four days on the countdown and did not climb higher than number eight. The video also premiered on BET's 106 & Park on March 25, 2005. The concept deals with Hollywood stereotypes and celebrity culture. Even though she is surrounded by it, JoJo claims she is "not the kinda girl" to lose herself in the industry. The video's cameos range from its choreographer Laurieann Gibson of MTV's Making the Band, to producers Vincent Herbert and Da Internz. During the first half of the video, JoJo is being driven in a limousine through Silver Lake past the landmark Figure 8 wall made famous by the Elliott Smith album cover photo. The performance-based second half features JoJo getting her hair and makeup, and rehearsing on a sound stage with backup dancers. The video ends showing the down-to-earth side of JoJo. Dressed in a hooded jacket and listening to her iPod, she hitches a bus featuring an advertisement for her debut album.

== Track listings ==
- German CD single
1. "Not That Kinda Girl"
2. "Not That Kinda Girl" (Mavix Remix)
- German CD maxi single and Australian CD single
1. "Not That Kinda Girl" (album version)
2. "Not That Kinda Girl" (Mavix Remix)
3. "Not That Kinda Girl" (CPH Remix)
4. "Not That Kinda Girl" (Funky Angelz Remix)
5. "Not That Kinda Girl" (video)

== Charts ==
Chart (2005)	Peak position
Australia (ARIA)	52
Germany (GfK)	85
US CHR/Pop Top 50 (Radio & Records)	49

== Release history ==
Region	Date	Format	Label	Ref(s)
United States	February 15, 2005	Contemporary hit radio	Universal	
United States	February 15, 2005	Rhythmic radio	Universal	
Australia	April 25, 2005	CD single	Universal Music	
Germany	August 1, 2005	CD single; CD maxi single	Black Ocean	
