= Mad Love Tour =

2017 concert tour by JoJo

- Tour by JoJo
- Promotional poster for the tour
- Associated album: Mad Love
- Start date: January 15, 2017
- End date: May 26, 2017
- Legs: 2
- No. of shows: 69

JoJo concert chronology
- I Am JoJo Tour (2015–16); Mad Love Tour (2017); Leaks, Covers and Mixtapes Tour (2018)

The Mad Love Tour is the fourth concert tour by American recording artist JoJo. The tour supported her third studio album, Mad Love (2016).

== Background ==
JoJo announced that the tour would launch in early 2017, after a performance of "No Apologies" on Today. On November 29, 2016, dates for the Mad Love Tour were announced through JoJo's social media accounts and official website.

Due to high demand for the initial date at KOKO, a second show was added in London, at Heaven on February 1. On February 14, 2017, JoJo announced during a Facebook live chat that the tour would expand to Canada with an additional 6 dates added to the tour. Pre-sale tickets were made available on Thursday, February 16 through her official website with general public tickets going on sale Friday, February 17.

On February 20, 2017, JoJo announced the cancellation of her San Luis Obispo, California tour stop due to a viral illness. JoJo performed the following date on February 21, 2017, in Los Angeles, California before cancelling and rescheduling several following dates due to a laryngitis infection.

== Promotion ==
In Europe, pre-sale and VIP tickets for the tour went on sale on November 30, 2016, with general public tickets going on sale on December 2, 2016. VIP packages for the tour included one General Admission ticket, access to a VIP meet and greet with JoJo, VIP exclusive poster, laminate, tote bag and wristband.

== Set list ==
This set list is representative of the performance on January 15, 2017. It is not representative of all concerts for the duration of the show.

1. "Clovers"
2. "When Love Hurts"
3. "Leave (Get Out)"
4. "Vibe"
5. "Say Love"
6. "High Heels"
7. "Like That/Like This"
8. "Reckless"
9. "Edibles"
10. "Music."
11. "Baby It's You"
12. "Disaster"
13. "We Get By"
14. "Marvins Room (Can't Do Better)" (Drake cover)
15. "Too Little Too Late"
16. "Weak" (SWV cover)
17. "I Am"
18. "FAB."
19. "Fuck Apologies."
20. "Mad Love" (interpolates Mariah Carey's "Vision of Love")

Encore

21. "Good Thing"

== Tour dates ==
List of concerts, showing date, city, country, venue, tickets sold, number of available tickets and amount of gross revenue
Date	City	Country	Venue	Opening Acts	Attendance	Revenue
Europe
January 15, 2017	Dublin	Ireland	The Academy	Callum Stewart; Craig Stickland	—N/a	—N/a
January 17, 2017	London	England	KOKO	Craig Stickland	—N/a	—N/a
January 18, 2017	Amsterdam	Netherlands	Paradiso	Craig Stickland	—N/a	—N/a
January 19, 2017	Paris	France	La Maroquinerie	Craig Stickland	—N/a	—N/a
January 21, 2017	Munich	Germany	Club Ampere	Craig Stickland	—N/a	—N/a
January 22, 2017	Milan	Italy	Tunnel Club	Craig Stickland	—N/a	—N/a
January 23, 2017	Cologne	Germany	Club Bahnhof Ehrenfeld	Craig Stickland	—N/a	—N/a
January 26, 2017	Copenhagen	Denmark	Lille Vega	Craig Stickland	—N/a	—N/a
January 28, 2017	Birmingham	England	O_{2} Institute 2	Craig Stickland	—N/a	—N/a
January 29, 2017	Manchester	England	Club Academy	Craig Stickland	—N/a	—N/a
January 30, 2017	Glasgow	Scotland	O_{2} ABC 2	Craig Stickland	—N/a	—N/a
February 1, 2017	London	England	Heaven	Craig Stickland	—N/a	—N/a
North America
February 15, 2017	Portland	United States	Wonder Ballroom	Stanaj	—N/a	—N/a
February 17, 2017	Seattle	United States	The Showbox	Stanaj	—N/a	—N/a
February 19, 2017	San Francisco	United States	Regency Ballroom	Stanaj	—N/a	—N/a
February 21, 2017	Los Angeles	United States	Fonda Theatre	Stanaj	—N/a	—N/a
March 4, 2017	Des Moines	United States	Wooly's	Stanaj	—N/a	—N/a
March 5, 2017	Omaha	United States	Slowdown	Stanaj	—N/a	—N/a
March 7, 2017	Minneapolis	United States	Fine Line Music Cafe	Stanaj	—N/a	—N/a
March 8, 2017	Sioux Falls	United States	The District	Stanaj	—N/a	—N/a
March 10, 2017	Madison	United States	Majestic Theatre	Stanaj	—N/a	—N/a
March 11, 2017	Milwaukee	United States	Pabst Theater	Stanaj	—N/a	—N/a
March 12, 2017	Chicago	United States	Concord Music Hall	Stanaj	—N/a	—N/a
March 19, 2017	New Orleans	United States	Republic New Orleans	Stanaj	—N/a	—N/a
March 21, 2017	Fort Lauderdale	United States	Culture Room	Stanaj	—N/a	—N/a
March 22, 2017	Orlando	United States	The Plaza Live	Stanaj	—N/a	—N/a
March 23, 2017	St. Peterburg	United States	State Theater	Stanaj	—N/a	—N/a
March 25, 2017	Charleston	United States	Music Farm	Stanaj	—N/a	—N/a
March 26, 2017	Columbia	United States	Music Farm	Stanaj	—N/a	—N/a
March 28, 2017	Washington, D.C.	United States	9:30 Club	Stanaj	—N/a	—N/a
March 30, 2017	Cleveland	United States	House of Blues	Stanaj	—N/a	—N/a
March 31, 2017	Columbus	United States	Newport Music Hall	Stanaj	—N/a	—N/a
April 1, 2017	Louisville	United States	Headliners Music Hall	Stanaj	—N/a	—N/a
April 3, 2017	Richmond	United States	National Theater	Stanaj	—N/a	—N/a
April 4, 2017	Norfolk	United States	Norva Theatre	Brayton Bowman	—N/a	—N/a
April 6, 2017	Greensboro	United States	Cone Denim Entertainment Center	Brayton Bowman	—N/a	—N/a
April 7, 2017	Nashville	United States	Cannery Ballroom	Brayton Bowman	—N/a	—N/a
April 8, 2017	Atlanta	United States	Buckhead Theatre	Stanaj	—N/a	—N/a
April 10, 2017	Houston	United States	The Ballroom at Warehouse Live	Stanaj	—N/a	—N/a
April 11, 2017	Dallas	United States	Trees	Stanaj	—N/a	—N/a
April 12, 2017	Austin	United States	Mohawk	Stanaj	—N/a	—N/a
April 14, 2017	San Antonio	United States	Paper Tiger	Stanaj	—N/a	—N/a
April 16, 2017	Memphis	United States	New Daisy Theatre	Stanaj	—N/a	—N/a
April 17, 2017	Normal	United States	Brown Ballroom	Stanaj	—N/a	—N/a
April 18, 2017	Wichita	United States	Cotillion Ballroom	Stanaj	437 / 1,035	$9,555
April 19, 2017	Columbia	United States	The Blue Note	Stanaj	—N/a	—N/a
April 21, 2017	Detroit	United States	Majestic Theater	Stanaj	1,110 / 1,110	$32,750
April 22, 2017	Pittsburgh	United States	Stage AE	Stanaj	—N/a	—N/a
April 23, 2017	Buffalo	United States	Town Ballroom	Stanaj	777 / 1,000	$19,596
April 25, 2017	Portland	United States	Port City Music Hall	Stanaj	—N/a	—N/a
April 28, 2017	Philadelphia	United States	Trocadero Theatre	Stanaj	1,143 / 1,143	$28,575
April 29, 2017^{1}	New Haven	United States	Old Campus	—N/a	—N/a	—N/a
April 30, 2017	Boston	United States	Royale Nightclub	Stanaj	—N/a	—N/a
May 2, 2017	New York City	United States	Irving Plaza	Stanaj	—N/a	—N/a
May 3, 2017	Huntington	United States	Paramount Theater	Stanaj	1,096 / 1,573	$33,117
May 4, 2017	New York City	United States	Irving Plaza	Stanaj	—N/a	—N/a
May 6, 2017	Toronto	Canada	Phoenix Concert Theatre	Locals Only Sound; Craig Stickland	—N/a	—N/a
May 7, 2017	Montreal	Canada	Corona Theatre	Locals Only Sound; Craig Stickland	—N/a	—N/a
May 10, 2017	Winnipeg	Canada	Burton Cummings Theatre	Locals Only Sound; Craig Stickland	—N/a	—N/a
May 11, 2017	Edmonton	Canada	Ranch Roadhouse	Locals Only Sound; Craig Stickland	—N/a	—N/a
May 12, 2017	Calgary	Canada	The Palace Theatre	Locals Only Sound; Craig Stickland	—N/a	—N/a
May 13, 2017	Vancouver	Canada	Vogue Theatre	Locals Only Sound; Craig Stickland	—N/a	—N/a
May 16, 2017^{2}	San Luis Obispo	United States	Fremont Theater	Keisha Renee	—N/a	—N/a
May 17, 2017^{3}	Santa Ana	United States	The Observatory	Keisha Renee	—N/a	—N/a
May 19, 2017^{4}	Scottsdale	United States	Livewire	Keisha Renee	—N/a	—N/a
May 21, 2017^{5}	San Diego	United States	House of Blues	Keisha Renee	—N/a	—N/a
May 23, 2017^{6}	Salt Lake City	United States	The Depot	Keisha Renee	—N/a	—N/a
May 24, 2017^{7}	Englewood	United States	Gothic Theatre	Keisha Renee	—N/a	—N/a
May 26, 2017^{8}	Lawrence	United States	Liberty Hall	Keisha Renee	354 / 1,010	$8,709

Notes

1. The April 29, 2017, concert in New Haven, Connecticut is part of the Yale University's annual spring music festival "Spring Fling 2017", where JoJo will headline.
2. The May 16, 2017, show was originally scheduled for February 20, 2017, however was cancelled and later rescheduled, due to laryngitis.
3. The May 17, 2017, show was originally scheduled for February 23, 2017, however was cancelled and later rescheduled, due to laryngitis.
4. The May 19, 2017, show was originally scheduled for February 25, 2017, however was cancelled and later rescheduled, due to laryngitis.
5. The May 21, 2017, show was originally scheduled for February 24, 2017, however was cancelled and later rescheduled, due to laryngitis.
6. The May 23, 2017, show was originally scheduled for February 27, 2017, however was cancelled and later rescheduled, due to laryngitis.
7. The May 24, 2017, show was originally scheduled for March 1, 2017, however was cancelled and later rescheduled, due to laryngitis.
8. The May 26, 2017, show was originally scheduled for March 3, 2017, however was cancelled and later rescheduled, due to laryngitis.
