= Artist vs. Poet discography =

- Studio albums: 6
- Extended plays: 5
- Singles: 10
- Music videos: 5

Artist vs. Poet is an American power pop band, formed in Dallas, Texas in late 2007. The band has released six studio albums, five extended plays, ten singles, and five music videos.

Artist vs. Poet released their first extended play through Arsenal Records, Alive Once Again on May 13, 2008. On November 18, 2008, they released their self-titled extended play through Fearless Records. The third extended play produced one music video. From then on, Artist vs. Poet released a fourth extended play, Damn Rough Night (Fearless Records) on December 14, 2009. Favorite Fix (Fearless Records) was released on March 2, 2010, this was the band's first studio album. Departing from Fearless Records, the band released their fifth extended play, Naughty Or Nice, online on a "pay what you want" donation box.

== Albums ==
=== Studio albums ===
Year	Album details
2010	Favorite Fix: Released: March 2, 2010; Label: Fearless Records; Format: CD, Digital download
2012	Remember This: Released: April 25, 2012; Label: Self Released; Format: Digital download
2013	Keep Your Secrets: Released: January 8, 2013; Label: Self Released; Format: Digital download
2013	Remember This (Anniversary Edition): Released: April 27, 2013; Label: Self Released; Format: Digital download
2014	Sake of Love: Released: March 4, 2014; Label: Self Released; Format: Digital download
2014	Medicine: Released: December 16, 2014; Label: Self Released; Format: Digital download

=== Extended plays ===
Year	Album details
2008	Alive Once Again: Released: May 13, 2008; Label: Arsenal Records; Format: Digital download; Artist vs. Poet: Released: November 18, 2008; Label: Fearless Records; Format: CD, digital download
2009	Damn Rough Night: Released: December 14, 2009; Label: Fearless Records; Format: Digital download
2011	Naughty Or Nice: Released: December 12, 2011; Label: Self released; Format: Digital download
2013	Sleep: Released: August 21, 2013; Label: Self Released; Format: Digital Download

=== Featured albums ===
Year	Album details
2010	Rockin' Romance 2: Released: June 15, 2010; Label: Destiny Worldwide; Format: CD, digital download
2010	Punk Goes Pop 3: Released: November 2, 2010; Label: Fearless Records; Format: CD, digital download
2010	'Tis the Season to Be Fearless: Released: November 22, 2010; Label: Fearless Records; Format: CD, digital download

== Singles ==
Year	Single	Album
2009	"Damn Rough Night"	Damn Rough Night
2011	"Doin' Alright"	Non-Album Single
2011	"Wasn't Worth It"	Non-Album Single
2012	"The Remedy"	Non-Album Single
2013	"Keep Your Secrets"	Keep Your Secrets
2014	"Close To You"	Sake Of Love
2014	"Made For Me"	Sake Of Love
2014	"Love Back"	Sake Of Love
2014	"Sincerely Me"	Medicine
2014	"Kids Again"	Medicine

== Music videos ==
Year	Title	Director
2009	"Runaway"	Scott Hansen
2011	"Airplanes And Candy Canes	Unknown
2012	"Stay"	Unknown
2012	"Different People"	Unknown
2013	"Where I'm Gonna Be"	Unknown
