= Remember This =

Remember This may refer to:

== Film and television ==
- Remember This (film), a 2023 American drama film
- "Remember This" (Coupling), a 2002 British sitcom episode

== Music ==
- Remember This (Artist vs. Poet album), 2012
- Remember This, a 2003 album by Gordon Giltrap
- "Remember This", song by Grady Martin And His Winging Strings, 1955
- "Remember This", song by Dolly Mixture, 1983
- "Remember This" (song), song by the Jonas Brothers, 2021
