= Mad Love (JoJo album) =

Studio album by JoJo
- Released: October 14, 2016
- Recorded: 2014–2016
- Studios: Acacia Sound, Atlantic, Eastwest, Studio 1 Zero, Westlake, The Lemonade Stand, Rock Mafia, Clarity (California); Khabang (Stockholm, Sweden); Loud Mouse (Toronto, Canada); ADP Music, Ealing (London, England)
- Genre: R&B
- Length: 41:04
- Label: Atlantic
- Producers: ADP; Josh "Igloo" Monroy; Jussifer; Matt Friedman; Jack & Coke; MNEK; Oscar Holter; Mike Kintish; Gray Hawken; Rock Mafia; Jack & Coke; Sawyr

JoJo chronology
LoveJo2 (2015)	Mad Love (2016)	JoJo (2018) (2018)

Singles from Mad Love
- 1. "Fuck Apologies" Released: July 28, 2016; 2. "FAB" Released: November 29, 2016

Mad Love is the third studio album by the American singer-songwriter JoJo. The album was released on October 14, 2016, through Atlantic Records. An R&B album, it serves as her first major release in a decade following 2006's The High Road. JoJo co-wrote every song on the album and produced her own vocals. Mad Love was JoJo's only release under Atlantic, as she left in August 2017 to form her own label under Warner Records.

Beginning in 2008, JoJo had recorded several incarnations of a third album while still contracted under Blackground Records. After signing with Atlantic in December 2013, the album began production from scratch; the majority of the album was recorded in early 2016. Amongst those included are collaborations with rappers Wiz Khalifa and Remy Ma, in addition to Canadian singer Alessia Cara who features on the song "I Can Only". JoJo also worked with producers Josh "Igloo" Monroy, Jussifer, Rock Mafia, Matt Friedman, Oscar Holter, and MNEK, among others.

Mad Love was preceded by the release of the lead single "Fuck Apologies" which features American rapper and Atlantic Records label mate Wiz Khalifa. The song became moderate success charting on the US Billboards Pop Digital Songs chart, peaking at number 40. It became JoJo's first charting single in the UK since 2007's "Anything", peaking at number 104 on the singles chart and number 18 on the UK R&B Singles Chart. "Mad Love", "FAB." featuring Remy Ma, and "Music" served as promotional singles leading up to the album's release. Mad Love was further promoted through the Mad Love World Tour.

Upon its release, Mad Love received generally favorable reviews from music critics, some noting that the album became JoJo's "bold coming-of-age statement" that helped cement her maturity and vocal growth since her previous album. Mad Love debuted on the US Billboard 200, Current Albums, and Top Digital Albums charts at numbers 6, 4, and 2 respectively with 25,000 album-equivalent units, of which 19,000 were traditional album sales. The first deluxe pressing of the album was released in vinyl on March 6, 2026, to commemorate the nine year anniversary of the albums release.

== Background and development ==
Following the release of "Anything"—the final single from her second studio album The High Road—in late 2007, JoJo stated that she had been writing and working with producers for her third studio album, but would not go into the studio until early 2008. In mid-2008, JoJo said that her third album, then-titled All I Want Is Everything, was scheduled for a fourth-quarter release that year. Due to difficulties with her label Blackground Records, the year passed without a release. Following numerous delays, on February 28, 2011, JoJo revealed the album would instead be titled Jumping Trains." The album again did not see a release and JoJo continued to face difficulties with her label. She was subsequently released from Blackground Records in December 2013 and recordings with the label were ultimately shelved.

Senior Vice President of A&R at Atlantic Records at the time, Aaron Bay-Schuck orchestrated the deal and was instrumental to JoJo's signing with Atlantic Records in January 2014. JoJo then began working on her third studio album for the label. However, on November 9, 2014, it was announced that Schuck would be leaving his position at Atlantic and was appointed the new President of A&R for Interscope Geffen A&M Records, thus leaving JoJo without an A&R at the label. In an interview with Idolator, JoJo spoke about how the change affected the album's development, stating: "The A&R that signed me, Aaron Bay-Schuck, left and went to Interscope... He called me and was like, 'I have this thing. I don't wanna leave you. I don't wanna lose you. But I need to go.' I said, 'I completely understand,' but then I was left at Atlantic again and just kind of didn't know what to do."

On August 21, 2015, JoJo released the extended play III (pronounced "tringle"). Following its release, JoJo embarked on her second worldwide headlining I Am JoJo Tour. Initially, the tour and III's release was a reintroduction for JoJo into the industry with a major-label backing. During this time, a large portion of the album had already been recorded and all three tracks from III were originally set to appear on JoJo's third album. However, these tracks were ultimately not included on Mad Love, with JoJo explaining "I was given a lot of songs, I was recording a lot of things that didn't feel completely 100% authentic to me."

In November 2015, during the I Am JoJo Tour, Levesque's father Joel died due to struggles with addiction. JoJo had also broken up with her boyfriend of two years. Following the tour's conclusion in December 2015, Levesque took a six-day rest from work during the first week of January 2016, where she booked a hotel and spent time with herself and re-evaluated her life. As a result, JoJo decided she was unhappy with the approach the album was taking. This resulted in III becoming its own standalone project, and JoJo began working on new material in early 2016, with only a few tracks from earlier recording sessions ("I Am" and "Good Thing") making it onto the Mad Love album. From September 9 to 15, 2016, JoJo uploaded short videos of her singing each song from the album on her Instagram account, revealing the track listing of the album.

== Concept and composition ==
Speaking on the meaning behind the album's title, JoJo stated: "Mad Love. means so many different things, and I loved that about the title. It was one of the first songs that I wrote for this album, and I felt like it kind of shaped the intention of it, of this work. And, a phrase that I use in my family a lot, we say, 'I love you madly.' That's that 'I love you through it all, I love you as you are, I love you in a crazy way, in a deep way, in a way that other people might not understand.' And that's how I feel about music, and that's what my relationship is with my fans, and it's an intense, passionate love. That's also the love that I like to have in my romantic life. So, all of that is represented on this album." Mad Love is mainly rooted in R&B sounds.

== Promotion ==
On June 6, 2016, JoJo was announced to be joining Fifth Harmony on their 7/27 Tour as a special guest opener in promotion for their second studio album. On July 26, JoJo debuted a short YouTube video that delivered a preview of new material, which included "Music" and "Fuck Apologies". The following day, she announced the release of her new album alongside the release of the lead single "Fuck Apologies". On July 28, it was announced that JoJo's third album would be titled "Mad Love".

JoJo performed "Fuck Apologies" for the first time live during her first stop on the 7/27 Tour. She performed a clean acoustic version of the song on the Elvis Duran and the Morning Show on August 1, along with a cover of Shawn Mendes's "Treat You Better". On September 7, JoJo revealed the album's cover artwork via her social media accounts and announced the album would be available for pre-order on September 16. The artwork was created by Nick Malvone with photos shot by photographer Brooke Nipar. According to Rap-Up, JoJo appears on the cover "looking fierce as ever" while the rest of the artwork is otherwise blurred by paint smears.

On September 30, JoJo performed "Fuck Apologies" with Wiz Khalifa on MTV's Wonderland, where she also performed "FAB" and "Mad Love". On October 14, 2016, JoJo performed "No Apologies", the clean version of "Fuck Apologies", on Today on October 14, 2016, and on Good Day New York on October 20. On October 22, Revolt TV aired an original concert show titled "Revolt Sessions" in which JoJo performed "Fuck Apologies".

=== Singles ===
Mad Love's lead single "Fuck Apologies" featuring Wiz Khalifa was teased by JoJo on July 26, 2016, in a promotional video previewing new music. The following day the single leaked in full online only hours before its release. The single was released as the lead single from the album on July 28. The music video, which was directed by Francesco Carrozzini, for the song was released on July 28, through JoJo's YouTube channel. The song debuted at number 40 on the US Pop Digital Songs Chart. Internationally, the song peaked at 104 on the UK Singles Chart and number 18 on the UK R&B Singles Chart.

"Mad Love" was released as the first promotional single on September 16, along with the pre-order of the album. After its initial release as a promotional single on September 23, "FAB" featuring Remy Ma was released as the album's second single on November 29. Its acronym name stands for "Fake Ass Bitches". "Music" was released as the third and final promotional single on October 6. A remix EP of "FAB" was released on March 3, 2017, featuring production from RealOnes, Kemist & DJ Braindead among others.

=== Tour ===
JoJo announced on Today that the Mad Love Tour will begin in early 2017. On November 30, 2016, JoJo announced her third headlining and second major world tour in support of her third studio album entitled the "Mad Love Tour". The 60-date "Mad Love World Tour" will travel throughout Europe and North America with the first leg of the tour beginning on Jan 15 in Dublin, Ireland and traveling across the UK for the month before concluding on Feb 1 in London. The second leg of the tour largely takes place in North America and began on Feb 15 in Portland, OR and travels to clubs and theaters across the country stopping in Seattle, San Francisco, Los Angeles, San Diego, Milwaukee, Chicago, Washington, Houston and more wrapping up in Huntington, NY on May 3. Craig Stickland and Stanaj were announced as opening acts for the UK and US leg of the tour respectively.

== Critical reception ==
Professional ratings
Aggregate scores
Source	Rating
Metacritic	70/100
Review scores
Source	Rating
AllMusic	3.5/5 stars
Clash	6/10
Entertainment Weekly	B+
Idolator	4/5 stars
The Guardian	3/5 stars
Pitchfork	7/10

The album has received positive reviews from music critics. At Metacritic, it has a score of 70 out of 100 based on 6 reviews.

Entertainment Weekly writer Nolan Feeney gave the album a B+ and wrote that JoJo's "well-documented struggles and triumphs inform her long-awaited third LP, Mad Love., and they turn her tales of love, friendship, and family into one bold coming-of-age statement". Idolator's Jon Reyes gave the album 4 out of 5 stars and wrote that JoJo is "sauntering in with Mad Love sounding totally refreshed". Pitchfork writer Vanessa Okoth-Obbo wrote: "Mad Love. sounds like an album that JoJo needed to make, and one that her fans were waiting for."

=== Year-end lists ===
Publication	List	Rank
Rolling Stone	20 Best Pop Albums of 2016	19

== Commercial performance ==
Mad Love debuted at number six on the US Billboard 200, selling 25,000 album-equivalent units, of which 19,000 were traditional album sales in its first week. It charted three spots lower and with significantly lower sales than her second album. Mad Love also debuted on the Current Billboard Albums & Billboard's Top Digital Albums chart at number 4 and number 2 respectively. It became JoJo's first entry on the chart in 10 years. In its second week Mad Love dropped from number six to one hundred and eleven on the Billboard 200 on the week starting November 12, 2016. In its third week the album left the Billboard 200 chart.

== Track listing ==
Standard edition
No.	Title	Writer(s)	Producer(s)	Length
1.	"Music"	Joanna Levesque; Jussi "Jussifer" Karvinen; Justin Tranter; Hayley Warner	Jussifer	3:35
2.	"I Can Only" (featuring Alessia Cara)	Levesque; Karvinen; Tranter; Warner; Alessia Cara	Jussifer	3:20
3.	"Fuck Apologies" (featuring Wiz Khalifa)	Levesque; Oscar Holter; Matt Friedman; Taylor Parks; Jason Dean; Joe Kirkland; Cameron Thomaz	Holter; Friedman; Noah "Mailbox" Passovoy^{[a]}	3:15
4.	"FAB" (featuring Remy Ma)	Levesque; Karvinen; Warner; Dean; Kirkland; Reminisce Smith	Jussifer	3:35
5.	"Mad Love"	Levesque; Joshua "Igloo" Monroy; Nikki Flores	Monroy; Eric Dawkins^{[a]}; Flores^{[a]}	4:04
6.	"Vibe"	Levesque; Antonina Armato; Tim James	Rock Mafia	3:07
7.	"Honest"	Levesque; Jakob Hazell; Svante Halldin; Warner; Dean; Kirkland	Jack & Coke^{[b]}	5:20
8.	"Like This"	Levesque; Monroy; Sidnie Tipton	Monroy	3:41
9.	"Edibles"	Levesque; Karvinen; Tranter; Warner	Jussifer	3:49
10.	"High Heels"	Levesque; Sawyr; Dean; Kirkland; Zak Waters	Sawyr	3:21
11.	"I Am"	Levesque; Alex Dezen; Eric Rosse; Jaden Michaels		3:57
Total length:				41:04

Deluxe edition
No.	Title	Writer(s)	Producer(s)	Length
12.	"Clovers"	Levesque; Monroy; Gino Barletta	Monroy	3:24
13.	"Reckless"	Levesque; Michael Kintish; Ryan Gray Hawken	Kintish; Hawken	3:42
14.	"Good Thing"	Levesque; Amish Dilipkumar Patel; Uzoechi Osisioma Emenike	ADP; MNEK	3:30
15.	"Rise Up"	Levesque; Hazell; Halldin; Warner; Dean; Kirkland	Jack & Coke	3:24
Total length:				55:04

=== Notes ===
- ^{^[a]} denotes vocal producer.
- ^{^[b]} Track 7, "Honest" contains a hidden track titled "Cold".

== Personnel ==
Credits were adaptes from AllMusic and the liner notes.

=== Creativity and management ===
- Gita Williams – management
- Katie Gallagher – management
- Chris Smith – management
- Evan Lipschutz – A&R
- Doug Davis – legal
- Benjamin Landry – Atlantic Business and legal affairs
- Anne Declemente – A&R administration
- Nina Webb – marketing
- Brooks Roach – marketing
- Carolyn Tracey – project director
- Nick Malvone Bilardello – art direction, design
- Brook Nipar – photographer
- Dante Marshall – additional photographer
- Tom Coyne – mastering

=== Performers ===
- JoJo – lead vocals, background vocals
- Alessia Cara – featured artist (track 2 "I Can Only.")
- Wiz Khalifa – featured artist (track 3 "Fuck Apologies.")
- Remy Ma – featured artist (track 4 "FAB.")
- Hayley Warner – background vocals
- Jakob Hazell – background vocals
- Jason Dean – background vocals
- Joseph Kirkland – background vocals
- Svante Halldin – background vocals

=== Technical ===
- Delbert Bowers – mixing
- Dexter Cabellon – assistant engineer
- Eric Dawkins – vocal producer
- Niklas Flyckt – mixing
- Serban Ghenea – mixing
- Ryan Gladieux – engineer, mixing
- Steve Hammons – engineer
- John Hanes – mixing engineer
- Adam Hawkins – mixing
- Oscar Holter – producer
- Jack & Coke – producer
- Jussi Karvinen – producer
- Joanna Levesque – vocal producer
- Josh "Igloo" Monroy – engineer, mixing, producer
- Erm Navarro – trombone
- Noah Passovoy – engineer
- Rock Mafia – mixing, producer
- T.J. Routon – producer
- Jacob Scesney – baritone saxophone, saxophone
- Joakim Söderström – mixing assistant
- Andrea "AD" Smith-Meecham – mixing assistant

== Charts ==
Chart (2016)	Peak position
Australian Albums (ARIA)	48
Belgian Albums (Ultratop Flanders)	126
Canadian Albums (Billboard)	22
Dutch Albums (Album Top 100)	104
France Digital Albums Sales (SNEP)	200
Irish Albums (IRMA)	70
New Zealand Heatseekers Albums (RMNZ)	1
Scottish Albums (Official Charts)	87
UK Albums (Official Charts)	46
US Billboard 200	6

== Release history ==
List of release dates and formats
Region	Date	Version	Format(s)	Label	Ref.
Various	October 14, 2016	Standard; Deluxe	Digital download	Atlantic	
United States	October 14, 2016	Standard	CD	Atlantic	
United States	February 3, 2017	Standard	LP	Atlantic	
Worldwide	March 6, 2026	Deluxe	LP	Atlantic	
