= FAB (song) =

Single by JoJo featuring Remy Ma

from the album Mad Love
- Released: November 29, 2016
- Studio: Atlantic (Los Angeles, California)
- Length: 3:34
- Label: Atlantic
- Songwriters: Joanna Levesque; Jussi Karvinen; Hayley Warner; Jason Dean; Joseph Kirkland; Reminisce Smith
- Producer: Jussifer

JoJo singles chronology
"Fuck Apologies" (2016)	"FAB" (2016)	"Disaster (2018)" (2018)

Remy Ma singles chronology
"Cookin" (2016)	"FAB" (2016)	"Money Showers" (2016)

Music video
- "FAB" on YouTube

"FAB" is a song by American singer-songwriter JoJo from her third studio album, Mad Love (2016). Featuring American rapper Remy Ma, it was written by JoJo, Jussi Karvinen, Hayley Warner, Jason Dean, Joseph Kirkland and Reminisce Smith, while production was helmed by Jussifer. The song was originally released as a promotional single on September 22, 2016, and later as the second single from the album on November 29.

"FAB" is a mid-tempo song with R&B influences. Lyrically, the song is an anthem that rallies against all "fake ass bitches", but also celebrates the "real ones". It received generally positive reviews from music critics, with many praising its direct content matter. Commercially, the song peaked at number 28 on the US Digital Pop Songs chart. A digital remixes extended play (EP), containing 5 remixes of the song, was released on March 3, 2017.

== Background and production ==
JoJo conceptualized the song at the gym while running on the treadmill. She compared her experience with the music industry with that of high school: "I was literally singing in my head, and I was like I can't stand these fake ass bitches in my face. I was like, you know what? I'm not cut out for the shmoozing and the fakeness. I literally can't stand it. I know I'm not the only one that can relate to that."

Although the song is an anthem for calling out fake people in one's life, the track is not just about one gender, but also meant to be a celebration, as JoJo stated: "This song is very direct... We've all encountered fake ass bitches, no matter the gender. So I wrote a song about it, calling them out but also celebrating the real ones." Following Remy's release from prison, JoJo sought her out, calling her one of her favorite rappers.

"FAB" was written by Hayley Warner, Jussi Karvinen, Jason Dean, Joseph Kirkland, Reminisce Smith and JoJo for the latter's third studio album, Mad Love (2016). The song includes additional vocals from American rapper Remy Ma, and was produced by Jussifer, who also contributed to the song's programming. It was recorded with guidance by Ryan Gladieux in Atlantic Studios in Los Angeles, California. The mixing of "FAB" was done by Adam Hawkins at Acacia Sound in Los Angeles, California and eventually, the mastering was done by Tom Coyne at Sterling Sound in New York. JoJo served as the song's vocal producer.

== Composition and reception ==
"FAB" received generally positive reviews from contemporary music critics; several publications coined the track as an anthem. Myles Tanzer from The Fader magazine called the track a "no haters anthem", commending the direct nature of the song's "annihilating" opening verse. Danny Schwartz of HotNewHipHop called it a "takedown of 'fake ass bitches'", while Bianca Gracie from Fuse TV regarded the song as a "bare bones track".

In a review for Clash, Shahzaib Hussain called the song a "gutsier, R&B-inflected mid-tempo... which sees her go off on Instagram millennials and clones". Madeline Roth from MTV News provided a positive review for the "fiery" tune, praising JoJo's approach from light commands like "Leave (Get Out)" and has "graduated to full-on blasting". Roth went on to praise Remy's "flawless bars that leave no room for interpretation", calling the use of her term fraud broads "praise-worthy all on its own". Writing for The Observer, Michael Cragg described the song as a "bolshy strut". Vanessa Okoth-Obbo of Pitchfork called both "Fuck Apologies" and "FAB" "obvious ploys for radio rotation", and found "the former comes complete with a tame Wiz Khalifa verse, while the latter boasts an always welcome contribution from Remy Ma. From a different artist, these songs might sound like pre-packaged attempts to jump on the same bandwagon that she decries in 'F.A.B.'"

== Release and promotion ==
"FAB" made its premiere exclusively through The Fader on September 22, 2016, as the second promotional single from Mad Love. JoJo shared the single's cover artwork on her social media. Although never released as a single to radio, a digital remix EP containing 5 remixes of the song was released on March 5, 2017, including various versions by Kemist, RealOnes, DJ Braindead, Giovanny and Wixard.

=== Live performance ===
On September 30, 2016, JoJo made her first televised performance of the song on MTV's newest music show "Wonderland", where she also performed album cuts for the first time including "Fuck Apologies" and "Mad Love". JoJo performed for various radio shows and publications including, Billboard's Live Facebook Stream on October 14, Paper on October 15 and Perez Hilton's "Perez TV" on October 24 among others. On November 5, 2016, she performed the song live for Revolt TV's "Revolt Sessions" music show. In promotion for the album, the song was included in the set list for JoJo's Mad Love World Tour.

== Music video ==
During a Facebook live Q&A, JoJo announced plans to shoot visuals for another song off the album, most likely "FAB". On November 29, 2016, in conjunction with the announcement of the Mad Love Tour, JoJo premiered the music video for the song on her YouTube channel.

Originally shot in colour, it was later converted to a black-and-white visual to better convey the song. Spin noted: "JoJo shows all sorts of sass as she sings the anthem among the streets of New York City. And with a saucy addition from Remy Ma in the middle of the clip, there's plenty of inspiration to tell your own haters off in a short three-and-a-half-minutes".

== Track listing ==
Explicit digital download

1. FAB (featuring Remy Ma) — 3:34

The Remixes (EP)

1. FAB (featuring Remy Ma; RealOnes Edit) — 3:31
2. FAB (featuring Remy Ma; (DJ Braindead Edit) — 3:01
3. FAB (featuring Remy Ma; Giovanny Edit) — 3:35
4. FAB (featuring Remy Ma; The Wixard Edit) — 3:24
5. FAB (featuring Remy Ma; The Kemist Edit) — 3:33

== Personnel ==
Credits were adapted from the liner notes of Mad Love.

=== Recording ===
- Recorded at Atlantic Studios, Los Angeles, California
- Mixed at Acacia Sound, Los Angeles, California
- Mastered at Sterling Sound, New York City, New York

=== Personnel ===
- JoJo – vocals, writing, vocal production
- Jussi Karvinen – writing
- Hayley Warner – writing
- Jason Dean – writing
- Reminisce Smith – writing, vocals
- Joseph Kirkland – writing
- Adam Hawkins – mixing
- Ryan Gladieux – recording
- Jussifer – producer, programmer
- Tom Coyne – audio mastering

== Charts ==
Chart (2016)	Peak position
US Pop Digital Songs (Billboard)	28

== Release history ==
Region	Date	Version	Format	Label	Ref.
Various	September 23, 2016	Clean; explicit	Digital download; streaming	Atlantic	
Various	March 3, 2017	Clean; explicit	Remixes EP	Atlantic	
