= Music (JoJo song) =

Promotional single by JoJo

from the album Mad Love
- Released: October 7, 2016
- Recorded: 2016
- Studio: Westlake
- Genre: Pop; R&B
- Length: 3:35
- Label: Atlantic
- Songwriters: Joanna Levesque; Jussi Karvinen; Hayley Warner; Justin Tranter
- Producer: Jussifer

Music video
- "Music" on YouTube

"Music" is a song by American R&B singer-songwriter JoJo from her third studio album Mad Love (2016). It was written by Joanna Levesque, Jussi Karvinen, Hayley Warner and Justin Tranter, while the song's production was helmed by Jussifer. The song was released as the third and final promotional single from the album on October 7, 2016. Sonically, "Music" is a piano-driven pop ballad with R&B influences. Lyrically, the song is a vivid storytelling of JoJo's upbringing, growth, her love for music and family, including and ode to JoJo's father Joel Levesque who died in November 2015, while JoJo was in early recording sessions for the album.

The song received generally positive reviews from contemporary music critics, with many praising the song's emotional weight and JoJo's raw vocal performance. JoJo dedicated the song to her father and links to the subject matter spoken about in her song "Save my Soul" from her "Tringle" (2015) EP. The song's accompanying music video premiered on JoJo's official YouTube channel on October 7, 2016, it consisted of clips of JoJo performing on stage, recording in studio, and doing interviews as a toddler as well as footage of her parents in a VHS style video. In promotion for her third album, "Music" was included in the set list for JoJo's Mad Love World Tour.

== Background ==
The song was originally titled "Who Would I Be" during the writing and recording process, JoJo opted to change the title to "Music" as the overall subject of the song related to music being her first love. During the recording process for Mad Love (2016), "Music" was the "most personal" and "most difficult" song to write and record for JoJo while serving as the opening song in the album's sequence. The song has been described as "autobiographical" and "soul-searching" along with "I Am", a song that closes up the standard edition of Mad Love. In an interview with TheFader, JoJo spoke on why opening and closing the album with these two songs was so important, "This album is more for my fans than anything else, who have stuck with me through times where I couldn't see a light at the end of the tunnel, or I thought, Who am I if I'm not doing this? They really gave me the strength to continue and to stay in a positive mind space. So book-ending [the album] with those two records is to give them some background and some insight. If I had ignored what I'd been through, it would have been a little odd." In promotion for JoJo's Tringle, she embarked on the "I Am JoJo Tour" at the end of 2015. Subsequently, during the tours run, JoJo's father Joel had died in November 2015 due to struggles with addiction. Following the tour's conclusion in December 2015, JoJo was unhappy with the shape of the album and began re-writing and re-recording the entire album from scratch at the beginning of 2016.

== Development ==
"Music" became the last song written during the whole album process. JoJo recorded the song in only two takes to maintain the emotion she delivered in the song, "the first time I literally choked; the second time I tried to get through it. I don't sound my best when I'm trying to sing through tears, so that's why I sound frog-ish at the end". Lyrically the song talks about how music has impacted and shaped JoJo's life, her upbringing and childhood, her relationship with her parents "It's just a very personal song and I felt like we covered a lot of ground with the subject matter on 'Mad Love.,' but it was important that I touched on family and music almost feeling like my third parent". Touching on her father's passing she states "For as long as I had known my dad, he had been struggling with his addiction. It was never alcohol — always prescription drugs, but then it became whatever he could get. When I got the call [to say he had died] it was something I had kind of gone through many times before. Like, How is it going to feel when it happens? But I never knew how it was going to feel, of course, until it actually happened. It wasn't a total shock. I don't know if that makes it easier or harder. Was I supposed to cancel the [Tringle] tour, to honor him? I felt as though he wouldn't have wanted me to stop, because I’ve been waiting for this moment. So I finished the tour.

== Composition ==
"Music" was written by Hayley Warner, Jussi Karvinen, Justin Tranter and Joanna "JoJo" Levesque for the latter's long-awaited third studio album Mad Love (2016). It was produced by Jussifer, while the track was recorded with guidance by Ryan Gladieux at Westlake Studios in Los Angeles. The mixing of "Music" was done by Adam Hawkins at Acacia Sound in Los Angeles and eventually, the mastering was done by Tom Coyne at Sterling Sound in New York City. JoJo served as the song's vocal producer.

== Critical reception ==
"Music" received positive reviews from contemporary music critics, many praising the song's emotional weight and JoJo's raw vocal performance. Jon Reyes from Idolator said it the best way to open up an album after ten years, "with her huge voice paired exclusively with a piano. It's an earnest love letter to music itself". Reyes went on to praise JoJo for not "over-singing" the song as easily as she could of much like her contemporaries counterparts that "plague others blessed with pipes like hers". in closing stating "JoJo serenely offers up the words, and a little bit of herself: 'Went on the road to make my daddy proud / But I lost him and then I sang to the crowd / My only hope is that he's looking down thinking / ‘Oh my God, my daughter's doing it now." In writing for Time, Raisa Bruner praised the song's lyrical content describing it as "both heartbreaking and uplifting" and calling it "a spare, deeply felt love song to the consistent power of music". Meredith Jenks of Billboard called the song a "raw piano-ballad opener".

In a slightly more positive review for the album Vanessa Okoth-Obbo from Pitchfork said it was "encouraging to see that after all this time" the risks JoJo took with the album paid off as sung in the song, "every night I bet my life on you". In a summary for Apple Music the sing was described as a "powerful meditation on her late father". In writing for The Observer Michael Cragg described the song as a "trampled under the emotional weight". Andy Kellman from AllMusic called the song a "soul-baring ballad". Chelsea Stone from Teen Vogue called the song a "total emotional throwback to JoJo's own childhood", while in closing describing the song's climax as "especially heart-wrenching" when JoJo sings about her father's death. In a review from Billboard, "Music" was described as "emotionally gut-punching" while the song's lyrical content was described as "heart-tugging". Rap-Up magazine stated that JoJo "tugs at heart strings" and called the song a "tear-jerking trip down memory lane" with "soaring vocals".

== Music video ==
On July 28, 2016, JoJo officially announced the release of her third studio album Mad Love (2016) in a short promotional video which included a snippet of the song and the song's video. "Music" made its official premiere on October 7, 2016, as the third and final promotional single from the album, alongside the song's music video. The music video is a VHS themed compilation that consists of old home movies and videos from JoJo's childhood, showing her performing on stage from a young age, dancing, acting, doing interviews and recording her first demo in studio as a toddler, as she sings about working for years to achieve her dream of being a singer. Clips of JoJo's father are shown while she was a guest on Kids Say the Darnedest Things, proudly watching from the audience as JoJo performs. Billboard magazine said the music video is and endless tape of "before she was famous footage", calling it a "nostalgic waltz through her memories".

== Credits and personnel ==
Credits adapted from the liner notes of Mad Love.

Recording

- Recorded at Westlake Studios, Los Angeles
- Mixed at Acacia Sound, Los Angeles
- Mastered at Sterling Sound, New York City

Personnel

- JoJo – vocals, writing, vocal production
- Jussi Karvinen – writing
- Hayley Warner – writing
- Justin Tranter – writing
- Adam Hawkins – mixing
- Ryan Gladieux – recording
- Jussifer – producer
- Tom Coyne – audio mastering

== Release history ==
Region	Date	Format	Label	Ref.
Various	October 7, 2016	Digital download; streaming	Atlantic	
