= Fuck Apologies =

2016 single by JoJo featuring Wiz Khalifa

Single by JoJo featuring Wiz Khalifa

from the album Mad Love
- Released: July 28, 2016
- Recorded: 2016
- Genre: Pop; R&B
- Length: 3:15
- Label: Atlantic
- Songwriters: Joanna Levesque; Taylor Parks; Cameron Thomaz; Oscar Holter; Matt Friedman; Whiskey Water
- Producers: Holter; Friedman

JoJo singles chronology
"When Love Hurts" (2015)	"Fuck Apologies" (2016)	"FAB" (2016)

Wiz Khalifa singles chronology
"Sucker for Pain" (2016)	"Fuck Apologies" (2016)	"Ain't Nothing" (2017)

Music video
- "Fuck Apologies" on YouTube

"Fuck Apologies", alternatively titled "No Apologies" for the radio edit, is a song by American singer JoJo featuring American rapper Wiz Khalifa from the former's third studio album, Mad Love (2016). It was released on July 28, 2016, by Atlantic Records as the album's lead single and impacted American contemporary hit radio on August 16, 2016. The song was written by the artists with Tayla Parx, Whiskey Water, and producers Oscar Holter and Matt Friedman.

== Background ==
Following the simultaneous release of JoJo's "Tringle" in August 2015, JoJo embarked on her worldwide second headlining "I Am JoJo Tour". Which saw her visit 23 cities nationwide with several international dates in Europe. Initially the tour and release of "Tringle" release was a reintroduction for JoJo into the industry with a major label backing that had been lacking from her previous label. At the time a large portion of the album had already been recorded, while the "Tringle" was set to appear on JoJo's third album as the first three singles from the album that would each receive service to top 40 radio at different stages leading up to the impending album release. During the tour, Levesque's father Joel died in November due to struggles with addiction and she also broke up with her boyfriend of two years.

Following the tour in December 2015, Levesque took a 6-day rest from work during the first week of January, where JoJo booked a hotel and spent time with herself and re-evaluated her life. As a result, JoJo was unhappy with the approach the album was taking and decided to "take control" and begun re-recording and re-writing the entire album to fit her new feelings and emotions. The end result was the "Infectious" lead single.

== Recording and composition ==
"Fuck Apologies"
A sample of the song.

"Fuck Apologies" is an up-tempo pop and R&B song that infuses twangy guitar rhythms, with a running duration of three minutes and 15 seconds. It was written by Joanna Levesque, Taylor Parks, Cameron Thomaz, Jason Dean, Oscar Holter, Matt Friedman and Joseph Kirkland while the song's production was handled by Matt Friedman and Oscar Holter for Wolf Cousins Productions. Noah "Mailbox" Passovoy handled the song's vocal production along with Levesque, which were recorded by Ryan Gladieux and Noah "Mailbox" Passovoy at Atlantic Studios and EastWest Studios in Hollywood, California. The track was engineered for mix by John Hanes, and mixed by Serban Ghenea at Mixstar Studios in Virginia Beach, VA. It was mastered by Tom Coyne at Sterling Sound in New York.

== Critical reception ==
Idolator gave the song a positive review in which Rachel Sonis called the track a "smash" with an "infectious" chorus. Bradley Stern of PopCrush praised the song for being "equal parts grown and gritty" and reminding fans why JoJo first rose to popularity. Noting the authenticity with which JoJo expresses the song's anger, David Watt of UK music blog All Noise wrote that "Fuck Apologies" allows the singer to "realize her full potential."

== Music video ==
The official music video for "Fuck Apologies" was released on July 28, 2016, through JoJo's YouTube channel.

== Promotion ==
On June 6, 2016, prior to any official announcements for release of JoJo's third album. It was announced that JoJo would be joining Fifth Harmony on their 7/27 Tour as a special guest opener in promotion for their second studio album. The North American leg of the tour begun on July 27 in Manchester, New Hampshire before concluding on September 17 in Las Vegas.

On July 26, 2016, JoJo debuted a short YouTube video that delivered a preview of new material to come from her forthcoming album. In it, scenes flash in and out, from present day to her past, showing what an impact music has had on her throughout the years. The video included a preview of a new emotional piano ballad titled "Music.". A more upbeat snippet of a song appeared at the end of the video later revealed to be the single.

The following day, JoJo announced the release of her new album through a shot of a pregnancy test and announced the first official lead single "Fuck Apologies", through her official Facebook page. That same day, the song was released to all digital retailers for purchase. Following the release, the song's accompanying music video debuted on JoJo's official website the next day.

== Live performance ==
JoJo performed "Fuck Apologies" for the first time live during her first stop on the 7/27 Tour closing her set with the song. She also performed a clean acoustic version of the song on the Elvis Duran and the Morning Show on August 1, 2016, along with a cover of Shawn Mendes' "Treat You Better". On September 30, 2016, JoJo made her first televised performance of the song along with Wiz Khalifa on MTV's newest music show Wonderland, where she also performed albums cuts for the first time including "FAB." and "Mad Love.". On October 14, 2016, she performed the song live on the Today show.

== Track listing ==
Explicit digital download
No.	Title	Length
1.	"Fuck Apologies" (featuring Wiz Khalifa)	3:15

Clean digital download
No.	Title	Length
1.	"No Apologies" (featuring Wiz Khalifa)	3:15

The Remixes (EP)
No.	Title	Length
1.	"Fuck Apologies" (featuring Wiz Khalifa) (YesYou Remix)	3:54
2.	"Fuck Apologies" (featuring Wiz Khalifa) (Onda Remix)	3:29
3.	"Fuck Apologies" (featuring Wiz Khalifa) (Anevo Remix)	3:50
4.	"Fuck Apologies" (featuring Wiz Khalifa) (Hellberg Remix)	3:54
5.	"Fuck Apologies" (featuring Wiz Kalifa) (Jump Smokers Remix)	4:56

Unplugged
No.	Title	Length
1.	"No Apologies (Unplugged)"	3:23

No Apologies. - Tropical Remix
No.	Title	Length
1.	"No Apologies" (featuring Wiz Khalifa & Nyanda) (The Kemist Remix)	3:12
2.	"No Apologies" (featuring Wiz Khalifa) (The Wixard Remix)	3:40

== Credits and personnel ==
Credits adapted from the liner notes of Mad Love., Atlantic Records.

Recording

- Recorded at Atlantic Studios, Los Angeles, CA
- Recorded at Eastwest Studios, Los Angeles, CA
- Mixed at Mixstar Studios, Virginia Beach, VA
- Mastered at Sterling Sound, New York, NY

Personnel

- JoJo – vocals, writing, vocal production
- Taylor Parks – writing
- Jason Dean - writing
- Oscar Holter – writing, production
- Matt Friedman – writing, production
- Joseph Kirkland - writing
- Wiz Khalifa – writing, vocals
- John Hanes – engineering
- Seban Ghenea – mixing
- Noah “Mailbox” Passovy – recording, vocal production
- Ryan Gladieux - recording
- Tom Coyne – audio mastering
- Evan Lipschutz – A&R
- Anne Declemente – A&R administration
- Gita Willams – management
- Katie Gallagher – management
- Chris Smith – management

== Charts ==
Chart (2016)	Peak position
Scottish Singles Sales (Official Charts)	56
UK Hip Hop/R&B (Official Charts)	18
UK Singles (Official Charts)	104
US Pop Digital Songs (Billboard)	40

== Release history ==
List of releases, showing region, date, format, explicitness, and record label
Region	Date	Format	Version	Label	Ref.
United States	July 28, 2016	Digital download	Clean; Explicit	Atlantic	
Worldwide	July 29, 2016	Digital download	Clean; Explicit	Atlantic	
United States	August 16, 2016	Contemporary hit radio	Clean	Atlantic; 300; RRP	
United States	August 26, 2016	Digital download – Remixes EP	Explicit	Atlantic	
Worldwide	November 18, 2016	Digital download – (Unplugged)	Clean	Atlantic	
Worldwide	December 16, 2016	Digital download – Tropical remixes	Clean	Atlantic	
