= Limbo (1999 film) =

1999 drama film by John Sayles

- Theatrical release poster
- Directed by: John Sayles
- Written by: John Sayles
- Produced by: Maggie Renzi
- Starring: Mary Elizabeth Mastrantonio; David Strathairn; Vanessa Martinez
- Cinematography: Haskell Wexler
- Edited by: John Sayles
- Music by: Mason Daring
- Production companies: Green/Renzi Productions; Screen Gems
- Distributed by: Sony Pictures Releasing
- Release dates: May 22, 1999 (Cannes); June 4, 1999 (United States)
- Running time: 126 minutes
- Country: United States
- Language: English
- Budget: <$10 million
- Box office: $2,160,710

Limbo is a 1999 American adventure drama film written, produced, edited, and directed by John Sayles. It stars Mary Elizabeth Mastrantonio, David Strathairn, Vanessa Martinez, and Kris Kristofferson. It is the first theatrical film to be released and distributed by Screen Gems.

== Plot ==
Port Henry, Alaska, is a town undergoing stress as the local economy switches from an industrial one based on the canning and paper industries towards a tourism-based model. Joe Gastineau is a former high school basketball star and fisherman who now works as a handyman, particularly for Frankie and Lou, a lesbian couple who own the local resort hotel. Joe is friends with teenager Noelle De Angelo, who also works for Frankie and Lou. At an event at the hotel, Noelle's mother, lounge singer Donna, breaks up with her live-in boyfriend and asks Joe to help her move. The two become close and eventually begin a romantic relationship.

Meanwhile, Joe gets the chance to return to fishing when Frankie and Lou ask him to work a fishing boat that they have acquired as collateral from local fisherman Harmon King. Donna' relationship with Noelle is strained, mainly because of Noelle's disapproval of her mother's lifestyle. This is exacerbated when Donna begins dating Joe, whom Noelle had a crush on. Donna also overhears the story of why Joe quit fishing: he had been involved in a deadly sinking that claimed the lives of his boatmates, including the brother of local bush pilot and small-time criminal "Smilin' Jack" Johannson.

When Joe's dissolute half-brother Bobby shows up, he asks Joe to help crew his boat to pick up a client. Joe brings along Donna and Noelle. They dock for the night in an isolated bay, and Bobby reveals the truth: he is involved in marijuana smuggling and had dumped a load overboard when he was spooked by the police. Now they are going to meet Bobby's partners to settle his debt. That night, men sneak onto the boat and kill Bobby.

Joe, Donna, and Noelle flee to a nearby island where the men begin to hunt them. They take shelter in an abandoned cabin and try to survive. As they do, they grow closer. Noelle finds a diary written by a teenage girl who had lived in the cabin with her family. She spends the nights reading segments of the diary to Joe and Donna. Eventually, Donna looks at the diary and discovers that it is blank after the portion her daughter Noelle had read during the first two evenings: Noelle had made up most of its contents, expressing her own feelings. They maintain a signal fire and scrape some food from the seashore.

After a week and a half, a seaplane piloted by Smilin' Jack Johannson lands. He says that he is looking for supplies, his radio is busted, and that he doesn't have enough fuel to fly them out. He tells Joe that he was hired by a couple of men to look for three people roughing it. When told of Bobby's murder, Jack expresses sympathy and promises to return the next day and rescue them. Joe, who does not trust Jack, sees that the radio was removed, and remains unsure of whether the seaplane return will bring rescue or the men who killed his brother. A stressful few days of rain prevent any flights' return. One morning, Joe, Donna, and Noelle gather on the beach as a seaplane flies towards them, larger than the one belonging to Jack.

== Cast ==
- Mary Elizabeth Mastrantonio as Donna De Angelo
- David Strathairn as Joe Gastineau
- Vanessa Martinez as Noelle De Angelo
- Hermínio Ramos as Ricky
- Kris Kristofferson as Jack "Smilin' Jack" Johannson
- Dawn McInturff as Audrey
- Casey Siemaszko as Bobby Gastineau
- Kathryn Grody as Frankie
- Tom Biss as Baines
- Rita Taggart as Lou
- Leo Burmester as Harmon King
- Michael Laskin as Albright
- Jimmy MacDonell as Randy Mason
- Mérit Carlson-van Dort as Stacy
- Monica Brandner as "Corky"

== Reception ==
=== Critical response ===
Limbo received generally positive reviews from critics. Roger Ebert lauded the film and its story structure, writing, "What I liked so much about this story structure is that it confounded my expectations at every step. I expected the story to stay in Juneau, but it didn't. When it took a turn toward adventure, I thought the threat would come from nature—but it comes from men. After the three characters are stranded, I expected—I don't know what, maybe Swiss Family Robinson-style improvisation. But Sayles gradually reveals his buried theme, which is that in a place like the Alaskan wilderness you can never be sure what will happen next. And that optimism, bravery and ingenuity may not be enough."

Christopher Null lambasted the ending, writing, "I can forgive many things. But using some hackneyed, whacked-out, screwed-up non-ending on a movie is unforgivable. I walked a half-mile in the rain and sat through two hours of typical, plodding Sayles melodrama to get cheated by a complete and total copout finale."

Review aggregator Rotten Tomatoes reports that the film has a 72% fresh rating, based on thirty-nine reviews. Metacritic, which uses a weighted average, assigned the film a score of 68 out of 100, based on 26 critics, indicating "generally favorable" reviews.

=== Accolades ===
Wins

- Seattle International Film Festival: Golden Space Needle Award; Best Director, John Sayles; 1999.
- National Board of Review: Special Recognition, for excellence in filmmaking; 1999.

Nominations

- Cannes Film Festival: Palme d'Or, John Sayles; 1999.
- Independent Spirit Awards: Independent Spirit Award; Best Male Lead, David Strathairn, Best Supporting Female, Vanessa Martinez; 2000.
- Las Vegas Film Critics Society Awards: Sierra Award; Best Actress, Mary Elizabeth Mastrantonio; 2000.

== Soundtrack ==
Mary Elizabeth Mastrantonio performed four of the nine songs on the soundtrack, which also features "Lift Me Up", an original song by Bruce Springsteen.
