= David Strathairn =

American actor (born 1949)

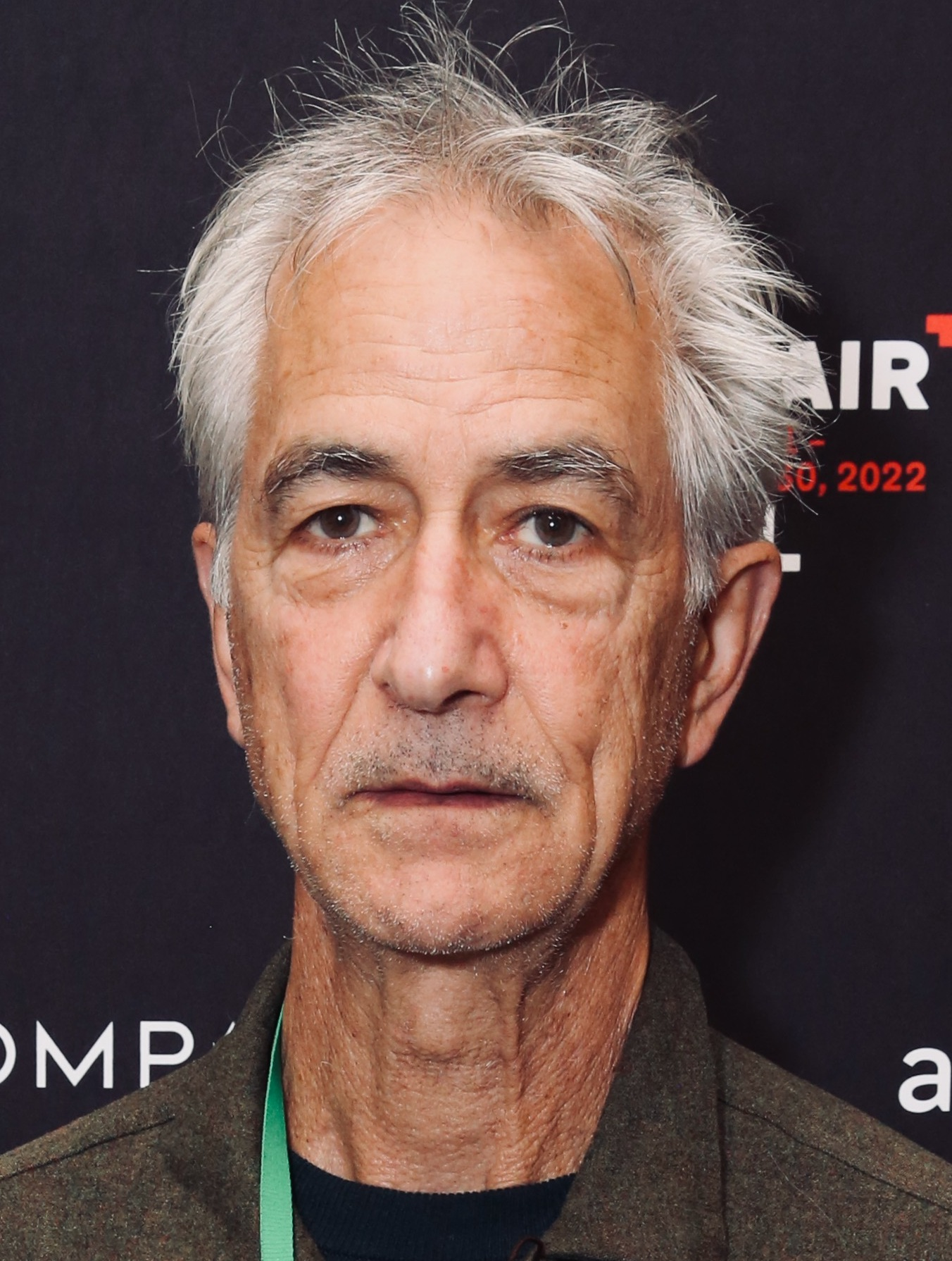
- Strathairn in 2022
- Born: David Russell Strathairn; January 26, 1949 (age 77); San Francisco, California, United States
- Education: Williams College
- Occupation: Actor
- Years active: 1979–present
- Spouse: Logan Goodman (m. 1980)
- Children: 2

David Russell Strathairn (/strəˈθɛərn/; born January 26, 1949) is an American actor. Known for his leading roles on stage and screen, he has often portrayed historical figures including Edward R. Murrow, J. Robert Oppenheimer, William H. Seward, and John Dos Passos. He has received accolades including an Independent Spirit Award, a Primetime Emmy Award, and a Volpi Cup, and has been nominated for an Academy Award, a BAFTA Award, two Golden Globe Awards, and four Screen Actors Guild Awards.

Strathairn made his acting debut in his fellow Williams College graduate John Sayles' film Return of the Secaucus 7 (1980), and continued acting in films by Sayles, including Matewan (1987), Eight Men Out (1988), City of Hope (1991), Passion Fish (1992) and Limbo (1999). In the 1990s, he appeared in box-office successes including A League of Their Own (1992), Sneakers (1992), The Firm (1993), The River Wild (1995) and L.A. Confidential (1997) before gaining prominence for his portrayal of journalist Edward R. Murrow in George Clooney's Good Night, and Good Luck (2005), for which he was nominated for an Academy Award for Best Actor. He is recognized for his role as CIA Deputy Director Noah Vosen in The Bourne Ultimatum (2007) and The Bourne Legacy (2012). He appeared in Steven Spielberg's Lincoln (2012), Chloe Zhao's Nomadland (2020), and Guillermo del Toro's Nightmare Alley (2021) and lent his voice to the Disney animated film Zootopia 2 (2025).

Also known for his work on television, he made his debut in the soap opera Search for Tomorrow in 1984. He portrayed Robert Wegler in the HBO drama series The Sopranos (2004). He received a Primetime Emmy Award win and a Golden Globe Award nomination for his performance in the HBO television film Temple Grandin (2010). He portrayed John Dos Passos in the HBO film Hemingway & Gellhorn (2012). He has had recurring roles in the Syfy series Alphas (2011–2012), the NBC series The Blacklist (2015–2016), the Showtime series Billions (2017–2019), and the SyFy, then Amazon Prime Video, series The Expanse (2018–2019).

== Early life and education ==
David Russell Strathairn was born on January 26, 1949, in San Francisco, California. He is of Scottish descent through his paternal grandfather, Thomas Scott Strathairn, a native of Crieff, and of Native Hawaiian and Chinese ancestry through his paternal grandmother, Josephine Lei Victoria Alana.

Strathairn attended Redwood High School in Larkspur, California. He graduated from Williams College in Williamstown, Massachusetts, in 1970. At Williams, he met fellow actor Gordon Clapp; and (after graduation) another Williams alumnus, director John Sayles, with whom he has collaborated on a number of projects.

Strathairn studied clowning at the Ringling Brothers and Barnum & Bailey Clown College in Venice, Florida, and briefly worked as a clown in a traveling circus.

== Career ==
Strathairn is a character actor, appearing in supporting roles in many independent and Hollywood films. In this capacity, he has co-starred in Twisted as a psychiatrist; in The River Wild as a husband; and in Blue Car as a teacher. Other notable film roles include his portrayals of baseball player Eddie Cicotte in Eight Men Out (1988); Col. Craig Harrington in Memphis Belle (1990); Whistler, the wisecracking blind techie, in Sneakers (1992); convict Ray McDeere in the legal thriller The Firm (1993); abusive husband Joe St. George in Dolores Claiborne (1995); Pierce Patchett, a millionaire involved in the seedy side of 1950s Los Angeles in L.A. Confidential (1997); Theseus, Duke of Athens, in the 1999 version of A Midsummer Night's Dream; and the title character in Harrison's Flowers (2000)

He has frequently worked with his Williams College classmate and director John Sayles. He made his film debut in Sayles' Return of the Secaucus 7, and appeared in his films Eight Men Out, Passion Fish, Matewan, Limbo, and City of Hope, for which he won the Independent Spirit Award. Alongside Sayles, he played one of the "men in black" in Sayles' 1983 film The Brother from Another Planet.

Strathairn's television work also includes a wide range of roles: Moss, the bookselling nebbish on the critically acclaimed The Days and Nights of Molly Dodd; Captain Keller, the father of Helen Keller in the 2000 remake of The Miracle Worker; Capt. Frederick Benteen, a U.S. 7th Cavalry officer under General Custer's command in Son of the Morning Star; and a far-out (both figuratively and literally) televangelist in Paradise, the pilot episode for a TV series on Showtime that was not successful. Strathairn had a recurring role on the hit television drama The Sopranos. Strathairn starred in the Miami Vice episode "Out Where the Buses Don't Run."

Strathairn was nominated for an Academy Award for his stirring portrayal of CBS newsman Edward R. Murrow in the 2005 biographical film Good Night, and Good Luck. The film explored Murrow's clash with Senator Joseph McCarthy over McCarthy's Communist witch-hunts in the 1950s. Strathairn also received Best Actor Golden Globe and Screen Actors Guild (SAG) nominations for his performance.

Strathairn appeared in We Are Marshall, a 2006 film about the rebirth of Marshall University's football program after the 1970 plane crash that killed most of the team's members; and Cold Souls, starring Paul Giamatti as a fictionalized version of himself, who enlists a company's services to deep freeze his soul, directed by Sophie Barthes. In 2006 he did a campaign ad for then congressional candidate (now Senator) Kirsten Gillibrand. He reprised his role as Edward R. Murrow in a speech similar to the one from Good Night, and Good Luck, but was altered to reference Gillibrand's opponent John Sweeney.

Strathairn plays the lead role in the 2007 independent film, Steel Toes, a film by David Gow (writer/co-director/producer) and Mark Adam (co-director/DOP/editor). The film is based on Gow's stage play Cherry Docs, in which Strathairn starred for its American premiere at the Wilma Theatre in Philadelphia.

He played a role in Paramount Pictures' children's film The Spiderwick Chronicles (2008) as Arthur Spiderwick. Strathairn appeared in the American Experience PBS anthology series documentary, The Trials of J. Robert Oppenheimer, a biography of the physicist. He first played Oppenheimer in the 1989 CBS TV movie Day One.

In 2009, Strathairn performed in The People Speak, a documentary feature film that uses dramatic and musical performances of the letters, diaries, and speeches of everyday Americans. It was adapted from the historian Howard Zinn's A People's History of the United States.

In 2010, Strathairn won the Primetime Emmy Award for Outstanding Supporting Actor in a Miniseries or a Movie for his portrayal of Dr. Carlock in the HBO television film Temple Grandin. For that role, he also won the Satellite Award for Best Supporting Actor – Series, Miniseries or Television Film and was nominated for a Golden Globe Award for Best Supporting Actor – Series, Miniseries or Television Film.

He played William Flynn, an FBI agent dealing with anarchism in 1920s New York City, in No God, No Master. He starred as Dr. Lee Rosen on Syfy's series Alphas.

In 2018–19, Strathairn appeared on the third and fourth seasons of SyFy's The Expanse as Klaes Ashford.

In 2020, Strathairn was one of the few professional actors in the Oscar-winner Nomadland, directed by Chloé Zhao. He appears alongside his son Tay, the first time they have acted together on screen since 1988's Eight Men Out when Tay was just eight years old.

Strathairn starred in the 2023 film Remember This, based on the stage play about the life of Polish diplomat and war hero Jan Karski who brought evidence of the Holocaust to Western governments during WW2. The film is executive-produced by Eva Anisko and directed by Jeff Hutchens and Derek Goldman.

The following year, he portrayed Bill Carruthers, creator of the popular game show Press Your Luck in The Luckiest Man in America, based on an actual incident involving a contestant on the show.

In 2025, he made his animation voice acting debut playing the lead antagonist, Milton Lynxley, in Walt Disney Animation Studios' feature film Zootopia 2.

=== Theater ===
Strathairn is also a stage actor and has performed over 30 theatrical roles. He performed several roles in stage plays by Harold Pinter. He has played Stanley in two consecutive New York Classic Stage Company (CSC) productions of Pinter's 1957 play The Birthday Party, directed by Carey Perloff (since 1992 artistic director of the American Conservatory Theater), in 1988 and 1989; the dual roles of prison Officer and Prisoner in Pinter's 1989 play Mountain Language (in a double bill with the second CSC Rep production of The Birthday Party); Edwin Booth in a workshop production of Booth! A House Divided by W. Stuart McDowell alongside Maryann Plunkett at The Players in 1989; Kerner, in Tom Stoppard's Hapgood (1994); and Devlin, opposite Lindsay Duncan's Rebecca, in Pinter's 1996 two-hander Ashes to Ashes in the 1999 New York premiere by the Roundabout Theatre Company.

In 2015, Strathairn appeared in Anton Chekhov's The Cherry Orchard with Mary McDonnell at People's Light theater in Malvern, Pennsylvania. He lent his voice talents to an adaptation in the form of a radio play of Sinclair Lewis' It Can't Happen Here by the Berkeley Repertory Theatre in October 2020.

Strathairn played Jan Karski in the one-man play Remember This: The Lesson of Jan Karski, written by Clark Young and Derek Goldman. The play is an original production by The Laboratory for Global Performance and Politics at Georgetown University. In 2021, Strathairn garnered critical acclaim for a production of Remember This at the Chicago Shakespeare Theater.

Strathairn narrated a biographical video to introduce Barack Obama before his acceptance speech at the 2008 Democratic National Convention.

Strathairn is starring as Vladimir in the Guthrie Theatre's production of Waiting for Godot.

== Personal life ==
Strathairn married Logan Goodman in 1980. They have two children, Tay and Ebby. Strathairn's son Tay Strathairn was keyboardist for the band Dawes.

== Acting credits ==
=== Film ===
Year	Title	Role	Notes
1980	Return of the Secaucus 7	Ron Desjardins	
1983	Lovesick	Marvin Zuckerman	
1983	Silkwood	Wesley	
1984	Iceman	Dr. Singe	
1984	The Brother from Another Planet	Man in Black	
1985	When Nature Calls	Weejun	
1986	At Close Range	Tony Pine	
1987	Matewan	Police Chief Sid Hatfield	
1988	Stars and Bars	Charlie	
1988	Call Me	Sam	
1988	Eight Men Out	Eddie Cicotte	
1988	Dominick and Eugene	Martin Chernak	
1989	The Feud	The Stranger	
1990	Memphis Belle	Colonel Craig Harriman	
1991	City of Hope	Asteroid	
1992	Big Girls Don't Cry... They Get Even	Keith Powers	
1992	A League of Their Own	Ira Lowenstein	
1992	Bob Roberts	Mack Laflin	
1992	Sneakers	Erwin 'Whistler' Emory	
1992	Passion Fish	Rennie	
1993	Lost in Yonkers	Johnny	
1993	The Firm	Ray McDeere	
1993	A Dangerous Woman	Getso	
1994	The River Wild	Tom Hartman	
1995	Losing Isaiah	Charles Lewin	
1995	Dolores Claiborne	Joe St. George	
1995	Home for the Holidays	Russell Terziak	
1996	Mother Night	Lieutenant Bernard B. O'Hare	
1997	Song of Hiawatha	Marcel	
1997	L.A. Confidential	Pierce Morehouse Patchett	
1997	Bad Manners	Wes Westlund	
1998	The Climb	Earl Himes	
1998	With Friends Like These...	Armand Minetti	
1998	Simon Birch	Reverend Russell	
1998	Meschugge	Charles Kaminski	
1998	Evidence of Blood	Jackson Kinley	
1999	A Midsummer Night's Dream	Theseus	
1999	Limbo	"Jumpin Joe" Gastineau	
1999	A Map of the World	Howard Goodwin	
2000	A Good Baby	Truman Lester	
2000	Harrison's Flowers	Harrison Lloyd	
2001	Relative Evil	Dr. Charlie	a.k.a. Ball in the House
2002	Speakeasy	Bruce Hickman	
2002	Blue Car	Auster	
2004	Twisted	Melvin Frank	
2005	The Notorious Bettie Page	Estes Kefauver	
2005	Missing in America	Henry	
2005	Good Night, and Good Luck	Edward R. Murrow	
2006	The Shovel	Paul Mullin	Short film
2006	Heavens Fall	Judge James Horton	
2006	We Are Marshall	Donald Dedmon	
2007	The Sensation of Sight	Finn	Also producer
2007	Steel Toes	Danny Dunckelman	
2007	Fracture	District Attorney Joe Lobruto	
2007	Racing Daylight	Henry Becker/Harry Stokes	
2007	The Bourne Ultimatum	Noah Vosen	
2007	My Blueberry Nights	Arnie Copeland	
2007	Matters of Life and Death	Mr. Jennings	
2007	Trumbo	Readings	
2008	The Spiderwick Chronicles	Arthur Spiderwick	
2009	The Uninvited	Steven Ivers	
2009	Cold Souls	Dr. Flintstein	
2009	The People Speak	Himself	Documentary
2009	Odysseus in America	Narration	
2010	Howl	Ralph McIntosh	
2010	The Tempest	Alonzo, King of Naples	
2010	The Whistleblower	Peter Ward	
2012	The Bourne Legacy	Noah Vosen	
2012	Maladies	Delmar	
2012	No God, No Master	William J. Flynn	
2012	Lincoln	William Seward	
2014	Godzilla	Admiral William Stenz	
2015	The Second Best Exotic Marigold Hotel	Ty Burley	
2015	Louder Than Bombs	Richard	
2015	The Debt	Nathan	
2016	American Pastoral	Nathan Zuckerman	
2017	Darkest Hour	Franklin D. Roosevelt (voice)	
2017	November Criminals	Theo Schacht	
2018	An Interview with God	God	
2018	Fast Color	Ellis	
2018	UFO	Franklin Ahls	
2019	Godzilla: King of the Monsters	Admiral William Stenz	
2019	The Devil Has a Name	Fred Stern	
2020	Walkaway Joe	Joe Haley	
2020	Nomadland	David	
2021	Nightmare Alley	Pete Krumbein	
2022	Where the Crawdads Sing	Tom Milton	
2023	Remember This	Jan Karski	
2023	A Little Prayer	Bill	
2024	The Luckiest Man in America	Bill Carruthers	
2025	O Horizon	Warren	
2025	Zootopia 2	Milton Lynxley (voice)	
2026	By Any Means	Special Agent Roy K. Moore	
TBA	Babies	Michael	Post-production

=== Television ===
Year	Title	Role	Notes
1984	Search for Tomorrow	Dr. Robert Hand	4 episodes
1985	Miami Vice	Marty Lang	Episode: "Out Where the Buses Don't Run"
1987	Broken Vows	Stuart Chase	Television movie
1987	Spenser: For Hire	Doggie Thorpe	Episode: "One for my Daughter"
1988	The Equalizer	Phillip Borchek	Episode: "Sea of Fire"
1988–91	The Days and Nights of Molly Dodd	Moss Goodman	20 episodes
1989	Wiseguy	Matthew Stemkowsky	2 episodes
1989	Day One	J. Robert Oppenheimer	Television movie
1990	Heat Wave	Bill Thomas	Television movie
1990	Judgment	Father Frank Aubert	Television movie
1991	Son of the Morning Star	Capt. Frederick W. Benteen	Television movie
1991	Without Warning: The James Brady Story	Doctor Art Kobrine	Television movie
1992	O Pioneers!	Carl Linstrum	Television movie
1994	April One	John McCowan	Television movie
1996	Beyond the Call	Russell Cates	Television movie
1997	In the Gloaming	Martin	Television movie
1998	Evidence of Blood	Jackson Kinley	Television movie
2000	Freedom Song	Peter Crowley	Television movie
2000	The Miracle Worker	Captain Keller	Television movie
2001	Big Apple	FBI Agent Will Preecher	8 episodes
2002	Lathe of Heaven	Mannie	Television movie
2002	Master Spy: The Robert Hanssen Story	Jack Hoschouer	Television movie
2004	The Sopranos	Robert Wegler	3 episodes
2004	Paradise	Reverend Bobby Paradise	Television movie
2008	The Trials of Oppenheimer	J. Robert Oppenheimer	BBC docudrama
2008	Monk	Patrick Kloster	Episode: "Mr. Monk and the Genius"
2010	Temple Grandin	Dr. Carlock	HBO television movie
2010	House	Nash	Episode: "Lockdown"
2011–12	Alphas	Dr. Lee Rosen	24 episodes
2012	Hemingway & Gellhorn	John Dos Passos	HBO television movie
2015–16	The Blacklist	Peter Kotsiopulos (aka The Director)	12 episodes
2015–17	Z: The Beginning of Everything	Judge Anthony Sayre	5 episodes
2015	Axe Cop	Extincter	Voice; Episode: "Night Mission: The Extincter"
2017–19	Billions	"Black Jack" Foley	8 episodes
2018	McMafia	Semiyon Kleiman	Miniseries; 7 episodes
2018–19	The Expanse	Klaes Ashford	13 episodes
2018	My Dinner with Hervé	Marty Rothstein	Television movie
2020	Interrogation	Henry Fisher	10 episodes
2021	Fairfax	Chet	Voice; Episode: "Chernobylfest"
2025	A Man on the Inside	Dr. Benjamin Cole	4 episodes

=== Theatre ===
Year	Title	Role	Playwright	Venue
1981	Einstein and the Polar Bear	Bobby Bullins	Tom Griffin	Cort Theatre, Broadway debut
1997	The Three Sisters	Vershinin	Anton Chekhov	Roundabout Theatre Company, Broadway
2001	Dance of Death	Kurt	August Strindberg	Broadhurst Theatre, Broadway
2003	Salome	Jokanaan	Oscar Wilde	Ethel Barrymore Theatre, Broadway
2012	The Heiress	Dr. Austin Sloper	Augustus & Ruth Goetz	Walter Kerr Theater, Broadway
2026	Waiting for Godot	Vladimir	Samuel Beckett	Guthrie Theater, Minneapolis, MN

=== Music videos ===
Year	Title	Artist	Notes
2018	"Oh Baby"	LCD Soundsystem	

== Awards and nominations ==
Organizations	Year	Category	Nominated work	Result	Ref.
Academy Award	2005	Best Actor	Good Night and Good Luck	Nominated	
BAFTA Award	2005	Best Actor in a Leading Role	Good Night and Good Luck	Nominated	
Critics' Choice Awards	2005	Best Actor	Good Night and Good Luck	Nominated	
Critics' Choice Awards	2005	Best Acting Ensemble	Good Night and Good Luck	Nominated	
Golden Globe Awards	2005	Best Actor – Motion Picture Drama	Good Night and Good Luck	Nominated	
Golden Globe Awards	2010	Best Supporting Actor – Series, Miniseries or Television Film	Temple Grandin	Nominated	
Independent Spirit Award	1987	Best Supporting Male	Matewan	Nominated	
Independent Spirit Award	1991	Best Supporting Male	City of Hope	Won	
Independent Spirit Award	1992	Best Supporting Male	Passion Fish	Nominated	
Independent Spirit Award	1999	Best Male Lead	Limbo	Nominated	
Independent Spirit Award	2005	Best Male Lead	Good Night and Good Luck	Nominated	
Primetime Emmy Awards	2010	Outstanding Supporting Actor in a Miniseries or Movie	Temple Grandin	Won	
Primetime Emmy Awards	2012	Outstanding Supporting Actor in a Miniseries or Movie	Hemingway & Gellhorn	Nominated	
Screen Actors Guild Awards	1997	Outstanding Cast in a Motion Picture	L.A. Confidential	Nominated	
Screen Actors Guild Awards	2005	Outstanding Cast in a Motion Picture	Good Night and Good Luck	Nominated	
Screen Actors Guild Awards	2005	Outstanding Actor in a Leading Role	Good Night and Good Luck	Nominated	
Screen Actors Guild Awards	2012	Outstanding Cast in a Motion Picture	Lincoln	Nominated	
Venice International Film Festival	2005	Volpi Cup for Best Actor	Good Night, and Good Luck	Won	
