= I Am JoJo Tour =

2015–16 concert tour by JoJo

- Tour by JoJo
- Promotional poster for the tour
- Associated album: III.
- Start date: November 2, 2015
- End date: March 7, 2016
- Legs: 2
- No. of shows: 31
- Website: www.iamjojoofficial.com/tour

JoJo concert chronology
- The Agápē Tour (2013); The I Am JoJo Tour (2015–16); Mad Love Tour (2017)

The I Am JoJo Tour was the third headlining & first world concert tour by American singer-songwriter JoJo. It was launched in support of her upcoming yet to be titled third studio album & its III., which included the album's first 3 singles. The first leg of the "I Am JoJo" tour was announced on October 5, 2015 and the first dates were revealed the same day. It kicked off on November 2, 2015 in Minneapolis. The tour traveled to theaters and clubs across the country, with stops in New York, Chicago, St. Louis, Los Angeles, Atlanta, Houston, and Toronto before wrapping the first leg in the U.S. on December 20, 2015 in New Orleans. The first leg of the tour will visit just 24 cities and is currently being expanded to more cities in the US and to Canada. Its first set of international European dates were announced on December 15, 2015 bringing a total of 31 shows so far; more international dates are yet to be announced. Preparations for the shows began a month prior to the beginning of the tour. After being away for so long JoJo wanted the tour to be more intimate and be "all about connecting".

The set list for the concerts included songs from JoJo's first two studio albums, her two mixtapes as well as few covers of other artists. The central theme of the tour was to take audiences down memory lane by performing her repertoire in chronological order beginning with her 2004 self titled debut album and everything else in between right up until her most current release of the III. Majority of the shows included VIP meet & greet packages that all took place before the show which included a private acoustic performance from JoJo, where she would perform a few rehearsed songs for the crowd as well as snippets of requested songs from the crowd which included most of the leaked songs that surfaced online throughout 2009 until 2014.

== Background ==
In an interview with Billboard.com at the 2015 MTV Video Music Awards on August 30, 2015, JoJo expressed plans to go on a nationwide tour before heading overseas in 2016 for further promotion. On October 5, 2015 JoJo announced her second major nationwide tour entitled The "I Am JoJo Tour" via her official Twitter page. The tour will visit 23 cities all across North America beginning on November 2 at Minneapolis’ Triple Rock Social Club and runs through the end of the year, wrapping up on JoJo's 25th Birthday on December 20 at the Hi Ho Lounge in New Orleans., making it her widest spread tour to date. The tour will visit smaller more intimate venues such as theaters & nightclubs as a way to reconnect with fans after so long. During an interview with AXS JoJo discussed what plans she had for the tour stating "For this tour, I wanted to take a journey back to the beginning, back to my first album where ‘Leave (Get Out)’ came from. I wanted to visit the second album, The High Road, which had 'Too Little Too Late.' And, I wanted to cover the mixtapes that I released while I was in that period of limbo. I'll be doing everything, right up to the tringle and I'll even do a couple of new songs that will be on the upcoming album". On October 26, 2015 JoJo officially announced that Aaron Camper would be serving as the opening act for the duration of the tour beginning on November 3, 2015 show. On December 14, 2015 JoJo announced the first international tour date for the show in Paris, France, on March 5, 2016. Tickets officially went on sale that same week on December 16, 2015. The next day an additional European date had been announced at the O2 Academy in Islington, London on March 7, 2016. Tickets go on sale December 17, 2015.

== Commercial response ==
Pre-Sale & VIP Tickets for the "I Am JoJo Tour" went on sale Wednesday October 7, 2015 with General Public tickets going on sale on Friday October 9, 2015. 2 hours after tickets went on sale The December 12 date in Washington, DC sold out, followed by New York (Nov. 3), Los Angeles (Nov. 23), San Francisco (Nov. 24), Seattle (Nov. 29) & Toronto (Dec. 15) all within its first day on sale. In response to the reaction to the tour JoJo stated "I am vibrating with excitement and thankfulness. After such a long journey, this kind of response surprises the hell out of me and makes me feel like the luckiest girl in the world. Which I am. To have you. THANK YOU THANK YOU". Due to the high demand of sales, On October 23, 2015 more VIP packages were made available for an additional 10 cities, which include tour perks & Meet & Greet packages. VIP packages for the tour included 1 Show Ticket, Access to a VIP Meet & Greet with JoJo, Access to an Acoustic Song Performed by JoJo, A Limited Edition Poster & An Exclusive VIP Laminate.

== Opening act ==
- Aaron Camper

== Tour dates ==
List of concerts, showing date, city, country, venue, opening act, tickets sold, number of available tickets, and amount of gross revenue
Date	City	Country	Venue	Opening act(s)	Tickets sold / available
Leg 1 – North America
November 2, 2015	Minneapolis	United States	Triple Rock Social Club		
November 3, 2015	New York City	United States	Marlin Room at Webster Hall	Aaron Camper	Sold Out
November 4, 2015	Philadelphia	United States	Coda	Aaron Camper	Sold Out
November 8, 2015	Cincinnati	United States	20th Century Theater	Aaron Camper	
November 10, 2015	Kansas City	United States	The Record Bar	Aaron Camper	
November 11, 2015	Chicago	United States	Lincoln Hall	Aaron Camper	Sold Out
November 16, 2015	Milwaukee	United States	Turner Hall Ballroom	Aaron Camper	
November 17, 2015	St. Louis	United States	Old Rock House	Aaron Camper	
November 19, 2015	Indianapolis	United States	The Emerson Theater	Aaron Camper	
November 23, 2015	Los Angeles	United States	The Roxy	Aaron Camper	Sold Out
November 24, 2015	San Francisco	United States	Social Hall	Aaron Camper	Sold Out
November 28, 2015	Portland	United States	Wonder Ballroom	Aaron Camper	
November 29, 2015	Seattle	United States	Neumos	Aaron Camper	Sold Out
December 4, 2015	Atlanta	United States	The Loft	Aaron Camper	Sold Out
December 6, 2015	Dallas	United States	Dada	Aaron Camper	
December 7, 2015	Houston	United States	Studio at Warehouse Live	Aaron Camper	
December 8, 2015 (Note: The December 8, 2015 concert in Pennsylvania, Wilkes-Barre was part of the 98.5 Krz Presents Let It Show 2015 Festival.)	Wilkes-Barre	United States	F.M. Kirby Center	Aaron Camper	
December 9, 2015	Fort Lauderdale	United States	Culture Room	Aaron Camper	
December 10, 2015	St. Petersburg	United States	State Theatre	Aaron Camper	
December 12, 2015	Washington	United States	U Street Music Hall	Aaron Camper	Sold Out
December 14, 2015	Cambridge	United States	The Sinclair	Aaron Camper	Sold Out
December 15, 2015	Toronto	Canada	Mod Club	Aaron Camper	Sold Out
December 16, 2015	Ferndale	United States	Magic Bag	Aaron Camper	
December 18, 2015 (Note: The December 18, 2015 concert in Birmingham, Alabama was part of the 103.7 the Q's 11th annual Little Black Dress Party. All proceeds benefit the Breast Cancer Research Foundation of Alabama)	Birmingham	United States	Workplay Theatre	Aaron Camper	
December 19, 2015 (Note: The December 18, 2015 concert in Nashville, Tennessee was part of the 107.5 The River presents the 1st Annual Ugly Christmas Party)	Nashville	United States	Wildhorse Saloon	Aaron Camper	
December 20, 2015	New Orleans	United States	Hi-Ho Lounge	Aaron Camper	Sold Out
Leg 2 – Europe
March 1, 2016	Cologne	Germany	Gloria Theater		
March 3, 2016	Hamburg	Germany	Mojo Club		
March 4, 2016	Amsterdam	Netherlands	Melkweg		Sold Out
March 5, 2016	Paris	France	Les Etolies		
March 7, 2016	London	England	O2 Academy Islington		Sold Out
