= Favorite Fix =

Studio album by Artist vs Poet
- Released: March 2, 2010
- Genre: Pop rock; pop punk; power pop
- Length: 42:18
- Label: Fearless Records

Artist vs Poet chronology
Damn Rough Night (2009)	Favorite Fix (2010)	Remember This (2012)

Professional ratings
Review scores
Source	Rating
AbsolutePunk	(77%)
Alternative Press	3.5/5 stars
I Am The Trend	2/5 stars
Shred News	8.5/10 stars

Favorite Fix is the debut full-length album by American pop punk band Artist vs. Poet, which was released on March 2, 2010. It was released through Fearless Records.

Favorite Fix, produced by Mike Green (Paramore, Breathe Carolina, The Matches), Zack Odom and Kenneth Mount (All Time Low, Every Avenue, Hit the Lights), is the follow-up release to the band's third EP Damn Rough Night, and the EP's title track is featured on the album. It is the second Artist vs. Poet album to be sold both digitally and physically, alongside the band's self-titled 2008 EP. Favorite Fix features Forever the Sickest Kids bassist Austin Bello on vocals for the track "Damn Rough Night", and The Maine's John O'Callaghan collaborating on "Car Crash".

== Track listing ==
No.	Title	Length
1.	"Car Crash"	3:15
2.	"Adorable"	3:32
3.	"Favorite Fix"	2:52
4.	"Unconscious Reality"	3:54
5.	"Damn Rough Night"	3:21
6.	"We're All The Same"	3:38
7.	"So Much I Never Said"	3:30
8.	"Miserably Loving You"	3:50
9.	"Broke But Not Broken"	3:59
10.	"He's Just Not Me"	3:15
11.	"Alive"	4:01
12.	"Giving Yourself Away"	3:11

Japan Bonus Tracks
No.	Title	Length
13.	"Purchase A Personality"	3:11
14.	"Hold On"	3:10
15.	"Fall As Fast As Me"	3:14

== Chart performance ==
Favorite Fix reached #17 on the Billboard Heatseekers chart.

== Personnel ==
- Tarcy Thomason - lead vocals
- Craig Calloway - guitar, backing vocals
- Joe Kirkland - guitar, backing vocals
- Jason Dean - bass guitar
- Joe Westbrook - drums
- Zack Odom - producer
- Kenneth Mount - producer
- Mike Green - producer
