= Remember This (film) =

- Directed by: Derek Goldman; Jeff Hutchens
- Written by: Derek Goldman; Clark Young
- Based on: Remember This: The Lesson of Jan Karski by: Derek Goldman; Clark Young
- Starring: David Strathairn
- Production company: Sobremesa Media
- Distributed by: Abramorama
- Release date: January 27, 2023 (limited)
- Running time: 95 minutes
- Country: United States
- Language: English

Remember This is a 2023 American drama film written by Derek Goldman and Clark Young, directed by Goldman and Jeff Hutchens and starring David Strathairn as Jan Karski. It is an adaptation of the play Remember This: The Lesson of Jan Karski by Goldman and Young.

== Cast ==
- David Strathairn as Jan Karski

== Release ==
The film was released in limited theaters on January 27, 2023.

== Reception ==
The film has a 100% rating on Rotten Tomatoes based on six reviews.

Michael Rechtshaffen of the Los Angeles Times gave the film a positive review and wrote, "Despite his perceived failings, Karski and Remember This serve as a crucial reminder of society’s duty to bear witness, especially whenever and wherever it would seem impossible to raise one’s voice above the din of indifference."

Claire Shaffer of The New York Times also gave the film a positive review and wrote, "...Strathairn is once again a one-man tour de force."

Julian Roman of MovieWeb also gave the film a positive review and wrote, "David Strathairn astounds in a tour de force adaptation of his harrowing one-man play(...)Strathairn brilliantly portrays every character in a devastating account of survival, courage, and unconscionable suffering."
