= Remember This (Artist vs. Poet album) =

2012 album by Artist vs. Poet

Studio album by Artist vs Poet
- Released: April 25, 2012
- Genre: Acoustic
- Length: 29:42
- Label: Self Released

Artist vs Poet chronology
Favorite Fix (2010)	Remember This (2012)	Keep Your Secrets (2013)

Professional ratings
Review scores
Source	Rating
Push To Fire	4/5 stars
Highlight Magazine	4/5 stars

Remember This is the second album released by American pop punk band Artist vs. Poet, which was released on April 25, 2012. It marks their first self-released album after being dropped by Fearless Records on December 7, 2011.

== Track listing ==
No.	Title	Length
1.	"Leavin’ In The Morning (Feat. Mat Musto)"	3:06
2.	"Stay"	3:13
3.	"Wait For You"	2:40
4.	"Anything At All"	4:06
5.	"Different People"	4:20
6.	"Let You Go"	3:33
7.	"Remember This"	5:05
8.	"The Best You Can Be"	3:39

== Personnel ==
- Joe Kirkland – Lead vocals, rhythm guitar, piano
- Jason Dean – Bass, drums
- Dylan Stevens – Lead guitar, backing vocals

== Remember This (Anniversary Edition) ==
Remember This (Anniversary Edition)

Studio album (reissue) by Artist vs Poet
- Released: April 27, 2013
- Genre: Pop Rock
- Length: 35:43
- Label: Self Released

Artist vs Poet chronology
Keep Your Secrets (2013)	Remember This (Anniversary Edition) (2013)	Sake of Love (2014)

Remember This (Anniversary Edition) is the reissue of the band Artist vs. Poet's acoustic album, Remember This, released on April 27, 2013. It features full band versions of all eight original tracks, a full band version of their single, "The Remedy", and a newly recorded track, "Whiskey > Problems".

=== Track listing ===
No.	Title	Length
1.	"Leaving In The Morning Ft. Blackbear"	3:08
2.	"Stay"	3:08
3.	"Wait For You"	2:40
4.	"Anything At All"	4:05
5.	"The Remedy"	3:03
6.	"Different People Ft. Devyn DeLorea"	4:17
7.	"Whiskey > Problems"	2:51
8.	"Let You Go"	3:41
9.	"Remember This"	5:23
10.	"The Best You Can Be"	3:27
