= State Theatre (St. Petersburg, Florida) =

Coordinates: 27.77142°N 82.64337°W

Floridian Social Club
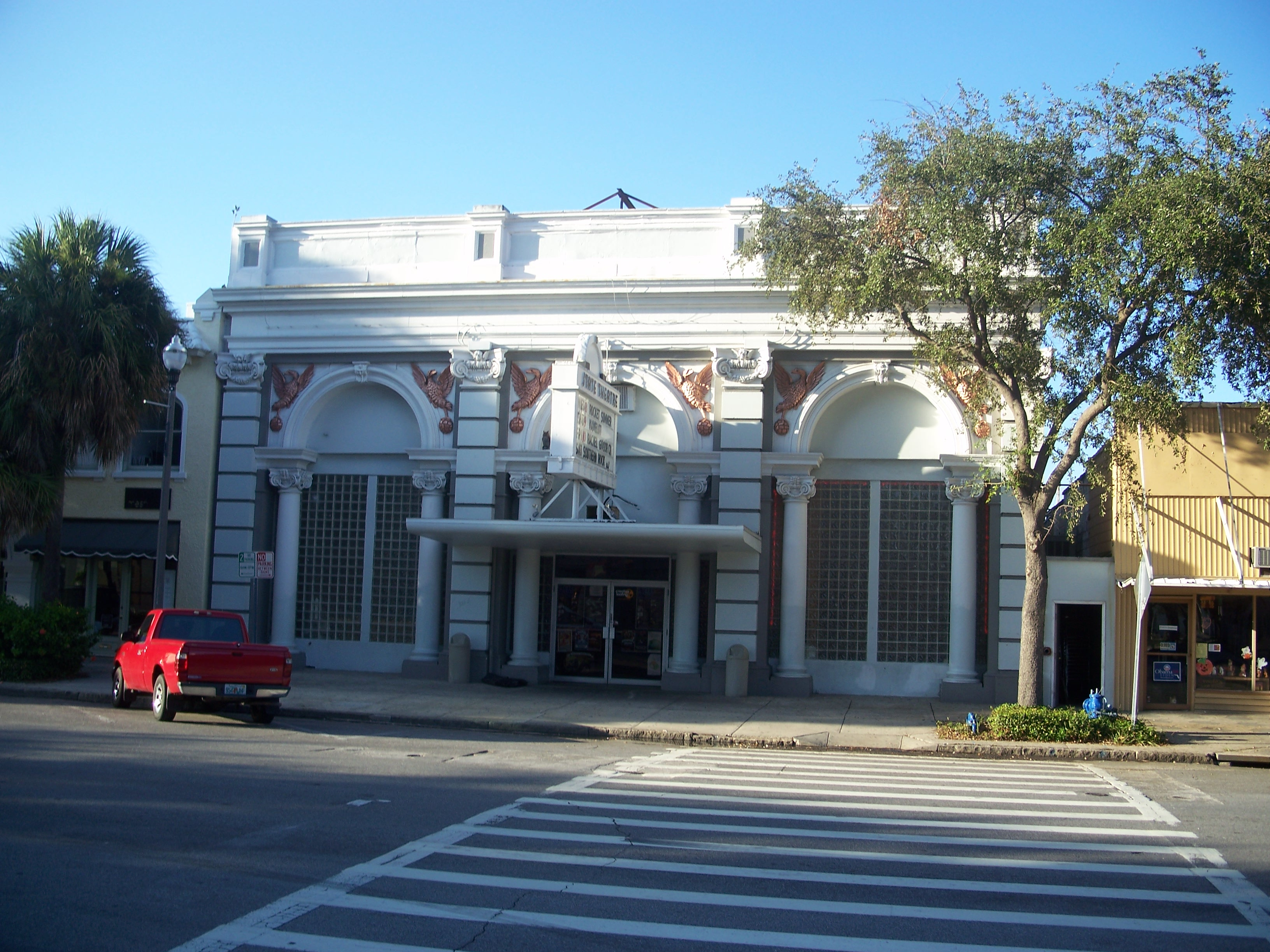
- Exterior view of venue (c.2008)
- Former names: State Theatre (1950-2020)
- Address: 687 Central Ave N St. Petersburg, FL 33701-3625
- Location: Downtown St. Petersburg
- Owner: Kevin Chadwick
- Capacity: 800

Construction
- Opened: May 1, 1950
- Renovated: 1990; 2017-20
- Reopened: February 5, 2021
- Architect: Archie Parrish

Website
- Venue Website
- Building details

General information
- Renovated: September 2018-February 2020
- Renovation cost: $1 million

Renovating team
- Architect: John A. Bodziak
- Other designers: Creative Arts Unlimited; ESI
- Main contractor: Boyd Construction

The Floridian Social Club (formerly the State Theatre) The State Theatre was a single-screen movie theatre that opened in 1949 and closed in 2017 due to local fire code violations. It was purchased in 2018, with renovations beginning that same year. Construction was completed however the site was not able to reopen due to the COVID-19 pandemic. The venue reopened in February 2021 as a Beaux-Arts style concert & ticketed event venue in St. Petersburg, Florida... Since 2026, The Floridian Social Club has operated primarily as a private events venue, hosting weddings, corporate events, galas, and other private events, after being awarded 2025's "Best Event Venue" by St. Pete Life Magazine.

In 1991, the building was added to The St. Petersburg Register of Historic Places.

== History ==
The original building was constructed as Alexander National Bank in 1924. It was designed by Neel Reid, who also designed the Alexander Hotel in St. Petersburg. At that time, the 6,000-square-foot (560 m^{2}) building made it one of the largest banks in St. Petersburg. The bank was shut down in 1926 with the death of Jacob Alexander.

During part of 1927, the building was occupied by the Gregory Electric Refrigeration Company but by 1928 sat vacant. The Fidelity Bank and Trust Company purchased the building in July 1929. The stock market crash in October of that same year was too much for the local economy and the Fidelity Bank, like most St. Petersburg banks, was forced to close. After Fidelity's liquidation in 1931, the building was used for a succession of small office tenants until 1949 when it was remodeled by Archie Parrish into the State Theatre.

In November 2016, the building failed a fire inspection, receiving 30 fire code violations from St. Petersburg Fire Rescue. By the end of August, the venue cleared 11 of the violations. In September, the owners hired John A. Bodziak to redesign the space to comply with local fire codes. The venue booked 12 concerts from mid-September to early November.

After an inspection on September 22, 2017, the fire department stated the capacity would have to reduce from 705 to 431. Despite protests from the owners, the City Council approved the occupancy limit. Seven concerts were canceled and moved to different venues, costing The State over $200,000 in lost revenue.

Bodziak redesigned the theater to increase the capacity to 590. Despite changes, the owners placed the property on sale in December 2017. The building sold for $2.1 million, purchased by real estate broker Kevin Chadwick. It was set to reopen on September 28, 2018, with a performance by Andy Grammer, however, this did not come to fruition. Instead, Chadwick expanded the renovations for the building.

Construction completed on the site in February 2020, with an increased capacity to 800. In April 2020, Chadwick announced the venue will now be named the "Floridian Social Club". The re-opened and remodeled venue hosted concerts for local, regional and national musical acts, as well as special events through 2025. Since 2026, The Floridian Social Club has operated primarily as a private events venue, hosting weddings, corporate events, galas, and other private events, after being awarded 2025's "Best Event Venue" by St. Pete Life Magazine.

== Design ==
The facade of the State Theatre is a symmetrical composition of three bays. The bays are defined by engaged pilasters expressed as a series of quoins above a projected water table base topped by an ionic capital with an attached swag. A projected cornice with a simple entablature tops the facade. Above this is a parapet divided into three corresponding bays again divided by projecting pilasters. Each of the three main bays contains a pair of ionic columns on a block base supporting a banded arch with an engaged keystone with an acanthus motif.

A stylized bas-relief eagle fills the space between the sides of the three arches and the engaged pilasters. The original fenestration was removed at the time of the 1949 remodeling when the openings at the side bays were filled, and a new contemporary projecting marquis was added at the central bay above the theater doors.

== Noted performers ==
- They Might Be Giants
- Cannibal Corpse
- Matchbox Twenty
- Orchestral Manoeuvres in the Dark (OMD)
- Fall Out Boy
- The 1975
- Twenty One Pilots
- Sum 41
- Stephen Stills
- Chick Corea
- Warren Zevon
- Garbage
- Tori Amos
- Yeah Yeah Yeahs
- Betty Who
- Shwayze
- The Dillinger Escape Plan
- Saliva
- LANY
- Dawes
- Less Than Jake
- Neon Trees
- The Ting Tings
- Hoodie Allen
- Watsky
- Ghoti Hook
- Millencolin
- Gogol Bordello
- Value Pac
