= Warehouse Live =

Music venue in Houston, Texas

- Interactive map of Warehouse Live
- Address: 2600 Travis Street; Houston, TX 77006
- Coordinates: 29.7458308°N 95.3779362°W
- Owner: Blackhorse Limo
- Operator: Big City Entertainment
- Seating type: General Admission
- Capacity: 1,300 (The Ballroom); 450 (The Studio); 125 (The Greenroom)
- Type: Club
- Public transit: Houston MetroRAIL Green Line & Purple line, exit EADO / STADIUM Station

Construction
- Opened: February 15, 2006

Website
- Venue Website

The Warehouse Live is a large club/small theater-sized live entertainment venue located in East Downtown (EADO), Houston, Texas.

Warehouse Live was converted from a warehouse built in the 1920s. The venue is distinctive for its LED chandeliers. There are three separate performance rooms: The Ballroom (capacity 1,300), The Studio (capacity 450) and The Greenroom (capacity 150). All concerts are standing-room-only as there are no seats in the venue.

Warehouse Live was awarded Houston's "Best Musical Venue" in 2008 by Citysearch. In 2017 Warehouse Live served as the Atlanta Falcons' Official Fan Headquarters during Super Bowl LI at NRG Stadium in Houston, TX.

It moved from East Downtown to Midtown in 2023.

== Events ==
A variety of acts have performed in this venue ranging from Adele, Bad Religion, Cannibal Corpse, JoJo, Drake, Fifth Harmony, Kendrick Lamar, Marina and the Diamonds, Kreayshawn, Meek Mill, Migos, Chris Cornell of Soundgarden, SZA, Skinny Puppy, Tyler, The Creator, Earl Sweatshirt, The Darkness, Sepultura, DEVO, Bloc Party, Olivia Rodrigo, Insane Clown Posse, JPEGMAFIA, Big KRIT, Ben Folds, D'Angelo, Blondie (band), Gwar, Bruno Mars, Coheed & Cambria, Dashboard Confessional, Hoobastank, Deftones, Opeth, Imogen Heap, Panic! at the Disco, P!nk, ScHoolboy Q, Mayhem, Watain, Slaughter, Snow Patrol, Jennifer Peña, Winger, Zhu and other musical acts, to comedy, burlesque, private events & parties.
