= Artist vs. Poet =

American power pop band

Artist Vs Poet
- Origin: Fort Worth, Texas, U.S.
- Genres: Pop punk; pop rock; power pop
- Years active: 2007–2017 (inactive)
- Label: Fearless
- Spinoffs: The Follow Through
- Past members: Craig Calloway; Cale Kanack; Jeff Olson; Patrick Rigden; Tarcy Thomason; Joe Westbrook; Dylan Stevens; Joe Kirkland; Jason Dean
- Website: Official Myspace

Artist vs. Poet was an American pop punk band from Fort Worth, Texas, United States, formed in late 2007 by Jason Dean, Craig Calloway, Jeff Olson, Patrick Rigden, Joe Kirkland, Joe Westbrook, and Tarcy Thomason. After many changes in the band, Artist vs Poet is made up of Joe Kirkland, on vocals, guitar and keyboards, and Jason Dean, on bass and drums. Kirkland was also a contestant in the third season of the American NBC reality show The Voice.

== History ==
After the demise of his previous band, Enter the Collector, Lead vocalist Tarcy Thomason advertised on MySpace.com about starting an acoustic project in 2007. Lead guitarist/backing vocalist Craig Calloway was the first to respond. They wrote music and quickly converted the project into a full band. Drummer, Joe Westbrook, joined the band as did bassist Jason Dean and finally rhythm guitarist and backing vocalist Joe Kirkland.

In 2008 they were signed by Fearless Records. Artist vs. Poet released their debut, self-titled EP in November 2008, recorded by producer Mike Green, who has worked with Paramore, The Higher, and Danger Radio. Their songs have been on MTV's The Real World and Parental Control. Alternative Press has called them "one of the 100 bands you need to know" in both 2009 and 2010. It was announced that Craig Calloway was leaving the band on a live ustream chat on September 23, 2010.

The band has traveled across the U.S. supporting their album and were a part of the Atticus Walk the Plank Tour with A Change of Pace and The Classic Crime. They have also toured with My American Heart, The Graduate, Danger Radio, Mayday Parade, Breathe Carolina, Go Radio, The Maine, We the Kings, as well as being on the Guys Guys Guys Tour with Sing It Loud, The Summer Set, The Morning Light, and The Friday Night Boys. AVP played all summer on the Vans Warped Tour 2010 and toured fall 2010 on the Fearless Friends Tour.

They released their second EP Damn Rough Night while on tour with Forever the Sickest Kids in 2009. Their first full-length album Favorite Fix was released on Fearless Records in March 2010. Favorite Fix reached No. 17 on the Billboard Heatseekers chart.

Artist vs. Poet covered Lady Gaga's song, "Bad Romance", for the album Punk Goes Pop 3.

in mid-2011, Artist vs. Poet announced that lead vocalist, Tarcy Thomason, and drummer, Joe Westbrook, were leaving the band. Thomason to spend more time with his wife and child; Westbrook to pursue further schooling. Lead guitarist, Craig Calloway, had already left the band, leaving only bassist Jason Dean and rhythm guitar Joe Kirkland. Dean and Kirkland felt they were an important enough part of AvP to keep the band alive. New lead vocalist, rhythm guitarist and keyboardist would be Joe, and a new lead guitarist and backing vocalist was added named Dylan Stevens. Jason would be bassist and drummer.

They more recently posted on the band's tumblr a voting poll for fans to vote which song the band should cover. Artist vs. Poet is going to record/release the winning song. As a result, the band covered Jason Derülo's "Ridin' Solo", Taylor Swift's "Mean", Nicki Minaj's "Super Bass" and Carly Rae Jepsen's "Call Me Maybe".

The band was released from the label on December 7, 2011, with the band releasing their own statement. The band subsequently independently released Naughty or Nice, a Christmas EP. They moved to Los Angeles in early 2012. They released an acoustic album, Remember This, on April 25, 2012, that contains eight original songs, including "Leavin' In the Morning" featuring Mat Musto as blackbear. They released a full-band album, Keep Your Secrets, on January 8, 2013, that features eight original tracks. and re-released their acoustic album, Remember This (Anniversary Edition), on April 26, containing all of the tracks on that album in full-band arrangement, as well as two new tracks, "The Remedy" and "Whiskey > Problems." They released "Sleep EP", a mix of old songs re-imagined and new material, on September 21, 2013, and Sake of Love, containing only new songs, on March 3, 2014. On December 8, 2014, the band announced that Medicine would be released on December 16, 2014, having released several tracks, including "Medicine", "Sincerely Me", "Break Away" and "Kids Again", via SoundCloud.

== Band members ==
Current members

- Joe Kirkland – lead vocals, keyboards, piano (2011–present), guitars (2007-present), backing vocals (2007-2011)
- Jason Dean – bass (2007–present), drums, percussion (2011–present)

Former members

- Jeff Olson – guitars, backing vocals (2007)
- Craig Calloway – guitars, backing vocals (2007–2010)
- Patrick Rigden – guitars, backing vocals (2007)
- Tarcy Thomason – lead vocals (2007–2011) (Deceased 2022)
- Joe Westbrook – drums, percussion (2007–2011)
- Dylan Stevens - guitars, backing vocals (2011-2014)

Timeline

== Discography ==
- 2008: Artist Vs Poet
- 2009: Damn Rough Night
- 2010: Favorite Fix
- 2012: Remember This
- 2013: Keep Your Secrets
- 2013: Remember This (Anniversary Edition)
- 2014: Sake of Love
- 2014: Medicine
