= George Watsky discography =

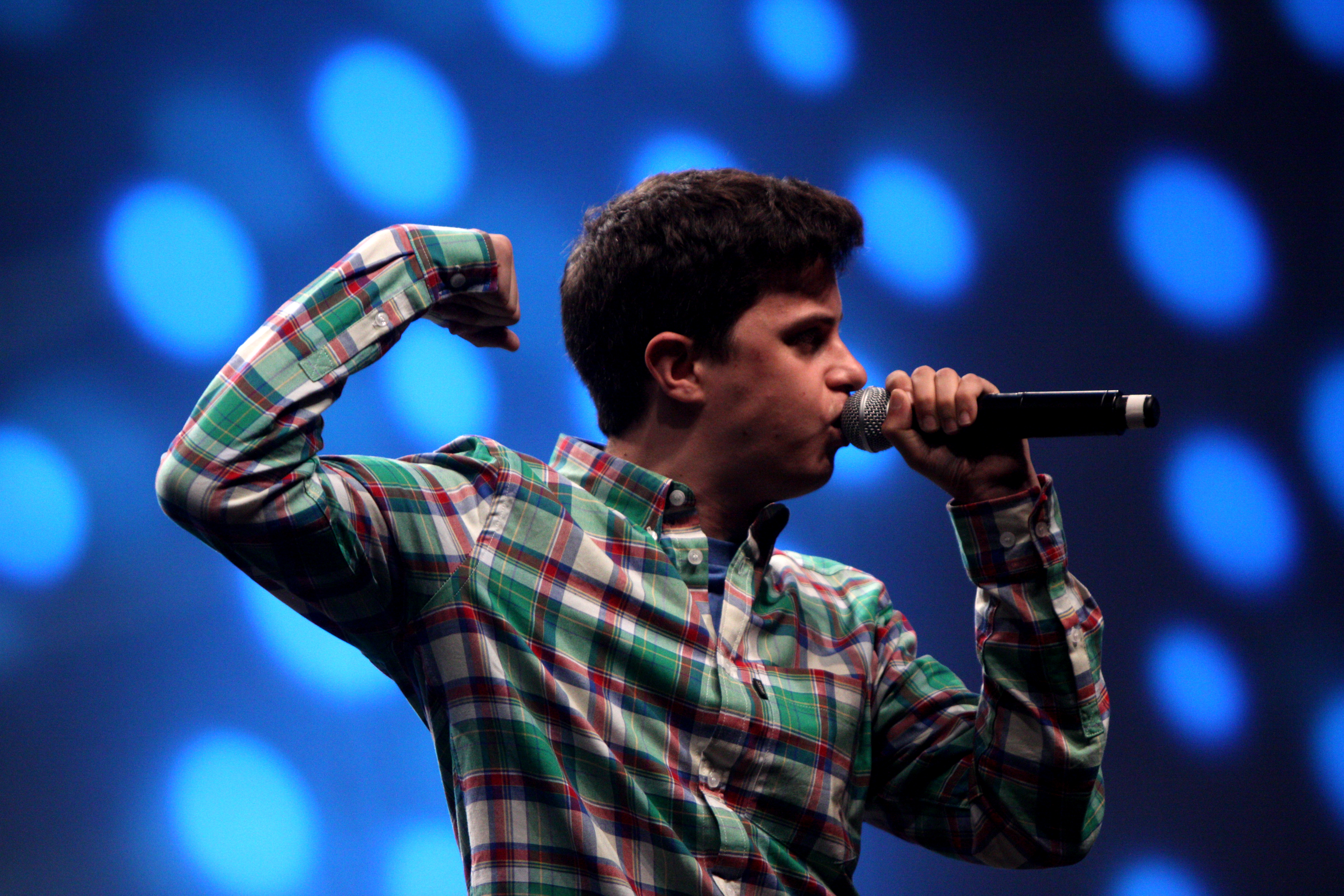
- George Watsky performing at VidCon 2012
- Studio albums: 7
- EPs: 2
- Live albums: 4
- Singles: 23
- Remix albums: 1
- Mixtapes: 3
- Guest appearances: 19

This is the discography of American hip hop recording artist George Watsky.

== Albums ==
=== Studio albums ===
Title	Details	Peak chart positions						
Title	Details	US	US Rap	US Ind	US Heat	BEL (V)	BEL (W)	CAN
Watsky	Released: October 14, 2009; Label: Watsky; Format: Digital download, CD	— (Note: Watsky reached as high as #7 on the iTunes Hip Hop albums chart.)	62	—	23	—	—	—
Cardboard Castles	Released: March 8, 2013; Label: Steel Wool; Format: Digital download, CD	50	6	9	—	—	—	—
All You Can Do	Released: August 12, 2014; Label: Steel Wool; Format: Digital download, CD	33	6	4	—	197	177	—
x Infinity	Released: August 19, 2016; Label: Steel Wool / EMPIRE; Format: Digital download, CD	58	5	6	—	—	—	96
COMPLAINT	Released: January 11, 2019; Label: Watsky; Format: Digital download, CD	–	—	—	—	—	—	—
PLACEMENT	Released: March 6, 2020; Label: Symmetry Unlimited; Format: Digital download, CD	–	—	—	—	—	—	—
INTENTION	Released: Part 1 - February 24, 2023; Released: Part 2 - April 12, 2023; Label: Symmetry 3.3 Music; Format: Digital download	–	—	—	—	—	—	—

=== Mixtapes ===
Title	Details
A New Kind of Sexy	Released: August 1, 2011; Label: Watsky; Format: Digital download
Nothing Like The First Time	Released: June 11, 2012; Label: Watsky; Format: Digital download
Plane 651 (Oops! All Berries) (Note: The track "Don't Be Nice" from Watsky's album x Infinity contains the lyrics "infinity versions of me in parallel universes". On December 5, 2016, Watsky released five projects meant to embody the concept of alternate universes to a secondary Bandcamp profile with the URL "kisswatskysgluteusmaximus.bandcamp.com".) (Note: The first project in Watsky's series of plane-themed releases is Plane 651 or Oops! All Berries, a mixtape containing leftover tracks from the x Infinity sessions.)	Released: December 5, 2016; Label: Watsky; Format: Digital download

=== Invisible Inc. ===
List of albums by Watsky and his band Invisible Inc.
Title	Details	Peak chart positions						
Title	Details	US	US Rap	US Ind	US Heat	BEL (V)	BEL (W)	CAN
Invisible Inc.	Released: July 1, 2007; Label: Watsky; Format: Digital download, CD	—	—	—	—	—	—	—
Fine Print	Released: March 30, 2018; Label: Watsky; Format: Digital download, CD	—	—	—	—	—	—	—

=== Remix projects ===
Title	Details
Guilty Pleasures (Note: Guilty Pleasures is a project that remixes Watsky's self-titled debut album Watsky. It contains mashups of tracks from the latter with popular music by other artists. The album was produced by Procrastination (the alias of San Francisco musician Tobias Butler).) (with Procrastination)	Released: August 3, 2010; Release type: LP; Label: Watsky; Format: Digital download
Plane 332 (MMM) (Note: The second project in Watsky's series of plane-themed releases is an extended play called Plane 332, which contains five remixed versions of songs from x Infinity.) (as Matsky or Mike Maven)	Released: December 5, 2016; Release type: EP; Label: Watsky; Format: Digital download
Plane 143 (Note: The fourth project in Watsky's series of plane-themed releases is ' Plane 143, is a full-length remix album containing alternate versions of the full x Infinity track list.) (as Bam Keith)	Released: December 5, 2016; Release type: LP; Label: Watsky; Format: Digital download

== Extended plays ==
Title	Details
Watsky & Mody (with Kush Mody)	Released: February 1, 2012; Label: Watsky; Format: Digital download
Grain 1,989^33 (Note: Grain 1,989^33 is a collection of leftover tracks from the COMPLAINT sessions. They were only released to the URL "kisswatskysgluteusmaximus.net " referenced in Watsky's song "Advanced Placement".)	Released: November 15, 2019; Label: Watsky; Format: Digital download

== Live releases ==
Title	Details
Undisputed Backtalk Champion: Behind the Book (Note: Behind the Book is an audio CD containing live performances of Watsky's spoken word and was released in accompaniment with a collection of his poetry, Undisputed Backtalk Champion. The CD was produced by 616.)	Released: January 1, 2006; Release type: LP; Label: Youth Speaks, Inc.; Format: CD
Live! From The Troubadour	Released: 2012; Release type: LP; Label: Watsky; Format: Digital download
All You Can Do: Live From The Regency Ballroom	Released: June 2, 2015; Release type: LP; Label: Steel Wool / Watsky; Format: Digital download
x Infinity LIVE! From the Fonda	Released: June 16, 2017; Release type: LP; Label: Steel Wool / EMPIRE; Format: Digital download
Lovely Thing Suite Live	Released: March 7, 2018; Release type: EP; Label: Steel Wool / EMPIRE; Format: Digital download

== Singles ==
Title	Year	Album
"Strong As An Oak"	2013	Cardboard Castles
"Moral Of The Story"	2013	Cardboard Castles
"Hey, Asshole" (featuring Kate Nash)	2013	Cardboard Castles
"Give A Hater A Hug"	2014	Non-album single
"Whoa Whoa Whoa"	2014	All You Can Do
"Ink Don't Bleed"	2014	All You Can Do
"Right Now"	2014	All You Can Do
"All You Can Do"	2014	All You Can Do
"Stick to Your Guns"	2016	x Infinity
"Tiny Glowing Screens, Pt. 3"	2016	x Infinity
"Talking to Myself"	2016	x Infinity
"Midnight Heart"	2016	x Infinity
"Brave New World"	2016	x Infinity
"Tiny Glowing Screens 3 Bossa"	2016	Plane 31,333 (Note: The third project in Watsky's series of plane-themed releases is Plane 31,333, a remix of x Infinity song "Tiny Glowing Screens, Pt. 3".)
"Sun Of Sound"	2016	31,332 (Note: The fifth and final project in Watsky's series of plane-themed releases is simply titled 31,332. Within it is one unreleased song called "Sound of Sun".)
"Welcome to the Family"	2018	Complaint
"All Like Whatever"	2018	Complaint
"Mean Ass Drunk"	2018	Complaint
"No Complaints No Conversation"	2018	Complaint
"Limos 4 Emos"	2019	Complaint
"Advanced Placement"	2019	Placement
"Undermine"	2020	Placement
"AWW SHiT" (featuring Hollis & Gifted Gab)	2023	Intention
"ROLLIN" (featuring Camila Recchio)	2023	Intention
"Paper Nihilist"	2023	Intention
"Exquisite Corpse X" (featuring Connor Price, Travis Thompson, Frak, Gifted Gab, Abhi The Nomad, & Chip Fu)	2026	Non-album single

== Guest appearances ==
Title	Year	Other artist(s)	Album
"The Answer"	2007	40 Love	Advantage
"Dr Seuss VS Shakespeare"	2011	—	Epic Rap Battles of History
"Monday Zombie Blues"	2012	Nice Peter	—
"That's Life"	2012	Tomorrows Bad Seeds	The Great Escape
"Don't Stop Me Now"	2012	Peter Hollens	—
"Doc Brown vs Doctor Who"	2012	—	Epic Rap Battles of History
"Work"	2012	dahLak	Spiritrials
"Obama Goes Ham"	2013	The Gregory Brothers	—
"Suit & Tie" (Cover)	2013	Mike Tompkins	—
"Stephen King vs Edgar Allan Poe"	2014	—	Epic Rap Battles of History
"What We Want"	2014	Bryarly	Bryarly
"No E"	2014	Zach Sherwin	Songs You Need To See The Video For
"No Flex Zone" (Remix)	2014	Karmin	—
"See You Again" (Cover)	2015	Peter Hollens	—
"Nobody"	2015	Spose	Why Am I So Happy?
"Never Afraid"	2015	MC Lars	The Zombie Dinosaur LP
"I'm Dope"	2016	The Palmer Squares	Planet of the Shapes
"An Open Letter (Interlude)"	2016	Shockwave	The Hamilton Mixtape
"Small Talk"	2016	Frak	Limewire '03
"One Step"	2016	Camila Recchio & Wax	Learning Logic
"Tear the Roof Off"	2017	Bliss n Eso	Off the Grid
