= Brave New Voices =

National youth poetry contest

- Status: Active
- Genre: Festivals, television
- Frequency: Annually
- Country: United States
- Major events: Poetry slam, spoken word contest
- Website: bravenewvoices.org

Brave New Voices (BNV) is a youth spoken word festival created by the nonprofit organization Youth Speaks in 1998. Its conception was inspired by the inaugural Youth Speaks Teen Poetry Slam in San Francisco, California, which was the first poetry slam dedicated to youth in the world. In the years since, Brave New Voices has grown to represent young writers from the ages of 13 to 19, and it is the largest ongoing spoken word festival in the world.

BNV's main event is the International Youth Poetry Slam, where as many as 50 teams, each composed of 4-6 youths, compete for title of best poetry slam team in the world. The final teams are judged by a jury composed of artistic personalities such as illusionist and television host Penn Jillette, poets Mayda Del Valle and Beau Sia, musician Talib Kweli and actress Sanaa Lathan.

In 2008 and 2010, the final rounds of the Brave New Voices Poetry Slam aired on HBO.

== HBO Presents Brave New Voices ==
James Kass, Marc Bamuthi Joseph and others had worked with Stan Lathan for several years to make sure that young people were booked on HBO's Def Poetry Jam. Before Russell Simmons and Lathan launched Def Poetry Jam on Broadway, they tried it out in San Francisco, finding appreciative audiences and new talents there. Kass, Bamuthi and others pitched the idea of the Brave New Voices series to Hollywood, and Lathan agreed to make it happen. He brought it to HBO, where young poets could tell their stories without fear of censorship.

Youth Speaks had collaborated with HBO's Def Poetry in previous years, but their 2008 docuseries was their first direct partnership with HBO and the Simmons Lathan Media Group. HBO additionally provided corporate support for the 2008 and 2010 Brave New Voices Festivals.

== The Brave New Voices International Youth Poetry Slam Festival ==
Brave New Voices is a program of Youth Speaks in San Francisco. The pedagogy of Brave New Voices was designed by Hodari Davis, who produced the festival alongside Joan Osato for over a decade. The festival is produced by alumni of the Brave New Voices community, referred to as Future Corps, every year in a different city around the United States.

The festival has happened annually since 1997, and first began as a 2-3 day experience for 5 teams. Since then it has grown to an annual competition featuring as many as 50 teams from the United States and around the world. BNV has been held in a number of different cities, including San Francisco, New York City, Washington D.C., Los Angeles, Houston, San Jose, Chicago, Las Vegas, Philadelphia, Oakland, and Atlanta.

During the Brave New Voices Festival, smaller events have been held that are open to all festival participants. There are many different types of competitions and events including Speak Green, MC Olympics, the Individual Poetry Slam, Queeriosity, and Life is Living. The winners and stand-out performers from these events are often highlighted during the festival, featured in social media and on YouTube, and have been given other performance opportunities outside of the festival.

=== International Youth Poetry Slam ===
The youth poetry slam hosts a number of preliminary events to reduce the number of competing teams to four. The process includes 2 quarterfinal rounds, where every registered competing team can participate. It is then followed by 4-5 semifinal rounds featuring the top 20 teams from quarterfinals. The winner of each semifinal bout then proceeds to final stage. Each slam is 4-5 rounds long and includes one speed round. Both group poems and individual poems are performed, and each slam is judged by 5 members from the community of the host city. These judges are often BNV partner affiliates, civic leaders, teachers, poets, celebrities, and other local volunteers.

Semifinal bouts have previously been held in prestigious venues around the United States, including Constitution Hall, the Kennedy Center for the Performing Arts, and the University of Chicago. The competition's final stage has had audiences of well over 2,000 people, and has been held in venues such as the Apollo Theater, the San Francisco Opera House, and the Chicago Theater.

=== Speak Green ===
Initially introduced in 2007 and hosted until 2012, Speak Green was a competition where participants wrote and performed poems about the environment and environmental justice. The event was a collaboration between Youth Speaks and the Robert Redford Sundance Institute. The top poets from the competition subsequently formed the Green Team for their year. Past members of the Green Team were able to perform at the Sundance Film Festival, the U.S. Greenbuild International Conference and Expo and the Kennedy Center. James Redford—son of Robert Redford, a sponsor of Speak Green—has spoken publicly about the Green Team's efforts, saying, "Artists like the Green Team poets have the power to remind us of the power of our own humanity. By taking something as broad as climate change, and running it through the prism of personal experience and artistic expression, well, what emerges are stories of undeniable honesty and power, stories that can inspire commitments to action, solutions, and change."

=== MC Olympics ===
Initially introduced in 2009, the MC Olympics is a rap competition inspired by the work of Young Chicago Authors. BNV established a National MC Olympics competition "as a model to engage rappers in the poet community". The competition is open to all participants of Brave New Voices, and each phase of the competition focuses on a certain style or technique of rapping such as freestyling and written verses. Each year, the winner of the competition each year is awarded a trophy.

=== Life is Living ===
Initially introduced in 2008 and hosted at BNV until 2021, Live is Living was an annual service project aimed at making a lasting contribution to the cities that hosted the festival. The BNV Life is Living Experience featured community activism, street parades, gardening, live performances, and celebration at the urban centers of these cities. Each year, 600 to 800 people provided physical support for local communities. Life is Living also hosted performances from artists including Saul Williams, Pharaoh Monch, Mick Jenkins, George Watsky, Chinaka Hodge, Jamila Woods, and Theaster Gates.

=== Queeriosity ===
Introduced in 2010, Queeriosity is an open mic for LGBTQ poets inspired by the work of Youth Speaks in the San Francisco Bay Area.

Following its inception, Queeriosity has held events in other cities.

The event is open to all festival participants, including youth poets, team coaches, and festival staff. In some festival years, the event has also been opened with a performance or workshop relevant to the city's LGBTQ community. In 2023, Queeriosity began with a Ballroom workshop.

== Competition Finalists ==
=== National Youth Poetry Slam ===
Year	Winner	Runners Up	Host City
2026	Ink Theory (New Haven, CT)	(2) Youth Speaks Bay Area (3) Lowell High School (Lowell, MA) (4) Dewmore Baltimore (5) BeSpoke (Bay Area, CA)	Oakland, CA
2025	Youth Speaks Bay Area	(2) Mass Poetry (Boston, MA) (3) Meta4 Houston (4) Dewmore Baltimore	Madison, WI
2024	Meta4 Houston	(2) Exodus United (Orlando, FL) (3) Southern Word (Nashville, TN) (4) Dewmore Baltimore	Washington, D.C.
2023	Meta4 Houston	(2) Urban Word NYC (3) Southern Word (Nashville, TN) (4) Sacramento Area Youth Speaks	San Francisco Bay Area, CA
2021	Run DSM (Des Moines, IA)	(2) Dewmore Baltimore (3) Hampton Roads Youth Poets (4) Urb Arts (St. Louis, MO)	Virtual
2020	Urb Arts (St. Louis, MO)	(2) Get Lit (Los Angeles) (3) Poetic Pathos (Fayetteville, NC) (4) Miami Gardens, FL	Virtual
2019	Urb Arts (St. Louis, MO)	(2) Young Chicago Authors (3) Youth Speaks Seattle (4) Just Say It (Newark, NJ)	Las Vegas, NV
2018	Dewmore Baltimore	(2) ROOTS Poetry Slam (Trinidad and Tobago) (3) Sacramento Area Youth Speaks (4) Mass LEAP (Boston, MA)	Houston, TX
2017	Forward Arts (Baton Rouge, LA)	(2) Mass LEAP (Boston, MA) (3) Atlanta Word Works (4) Philly Youth Poetry Movement	San Francisco Bay Area, CA
2016	Dewmore Baltimore	(2) Hampton Roads Youth Poets (3) Atlanta Word Works (4) Young Chicago Authors	Washington, D.C.
2015	Philadelphia Youth Poetry Movement	(2) Atlanta Word Works (3) Fort Worth, TX (4) Minor Disturbance (Denver, CO)	Atlanta, GA
2014	Washington, D.C.	(2) Cape Town, South Africa (3) Get Lit (Los Angeles, CA) (4) Minor Disturbance (Denver, CO)	Philadelphia, PA
2013	Minor Disturbance (Denver, CO)	(2) Washington, D.C. (3) Urban Word NYC (4) Albuquerque, NM	Chicago, IL
2012	Minor Disturbance (Denver, CO)	(2) Philly Youth Poetry Movement (3) Richmond, VA (4) Youth Speaks Bay Area	San Francisco Bay Area, CA
2011	Philadelphia Youth Poetry Movement	(2) Urban Word NYC (3) Minor Disturbance (Denver, CO) (4) Detroit, MI	San Francisco Bay Area, CA
2010	Urban Word NYC	(2) Youth Speaks Bay Area (3) Albuquerque, NM (4) Minor Disturbance (Denver, CO)	Los Angeles, CA
2009	Youth Speaks Hawai'i	(2) Leeds Young Authors (Leeds, England) (3) Youth Speaks Bay Area (4) Jacksonville, FL	Chicago, IL
2008	Youth Speaks Hawai'i	(2) Urban Word NYC (3) Young Chicago Authors (4) Rochester, NY	Washington, D.C.
2007	Philadelphia Youth Poetry Movement	(2) Providence, RI (3) Urban Word NYC (4) Cleveland, OH	San Jose, CA
2006	Youth Speaks Bay Area	(2) Urban Word NYC (3) Philly Youth Poetry Movement (4) Providence, RI	New York City, NY
2005	Urban Word NYC	(2) Youth Speaks Bay Area (3) Chico Speaks (Chico, CA)	San Francisco Bay Area, CA

=== MC Olympic Champions ===
Year	Winner
2020	Malick Da Blackstract (Savannah, GA)
2018	Mailo (Atlanta, GA)
2017	Mai’saan (San Francisco Bay Area, CA)
2016	Amari Chatmon (Bay Area, CA)
2015	Issa Shomari Jackson (Sacramento, CA)
2014	Juwan Seaton (Philadelphia, PA)
2013	Joey Davis (Kansas City, KS)
2012	Robyn Kidd (Houston, TX)
2011	Robyn Kidd (Houston, TX)
2010	Eli Lynch (Denver, CO)
2009	Trey Amos (Nashville, TN)

=== Individual Poetry Slam Champions ===
Year	Winner	Runner up
2012	Daisy Armstrong (Stockton, CA)	Kai Davis (Philadelphia)
