= Bruce George (disambiguation) =

Bruce George (1942–2020) was a British Labour Party politician.

Bruce George may also refer to:

- Tony George (weightlifter) (Bruce Ronald George, 1919–2006), New Zealand weightlifter
- Bruce George (Genius Is Common), founder of the Genius Is Common movement
