= Def Poetry Jam =

Spoken word poetry television series

- Presented by: Mos Def
- Country of origin: United States
- Original language: English

Production
- Producer: Russell Simmons

Original release
- Network: HBO
- Release: 2002 – 2007

Russell Simmons Presents Def Poetry, better known as simply Def Poetry Jam or Def Poetry, was a spoken word poetry television series hosted by Mos Def and airing on HBO between 2002 and 2007. The series features performances by established and up-and-coming spoken word poets. Performances also included special appearances by well-known actors and musicians, as well as occasional performances by Mos Def himself. Co-created by Bruce George, Danny Simmons, Deborah Pointer, Stan Lathan, and Russell Simmons, the show is a spin-off of the popular Def Comedy Jam which began airing on HBO in the 1990s.

== About ==
The series included historical legendary poets such as The Last Poets, Nikki Giovanni, Amiri Baraka, and Sonia Sanchez. It also featured poets, Saul Williams, J. Ivy, Jessica Care Moore, Lemon and openly gay poet Emanuel Xavier. Though technically not a poetry slam, Def Poetry has become heavily associated with the poetry slam movement, and utilized many of poetry slam's best-known poets, including National Poetry Slam champions such as Beau Sia, Taylor Mali, Big Poppa E, Mayda Del Valle, Mike Mcgee, Alix Olson and Rives, among others. Even poets who are critical of the poetry slam, such as John S. Hall, have acknowledged slam's influence on the show. In a 2005 interview, Hall was quoted as saying:

It's true that I was on Def Poetry even though I've never slammed. I'm probably the only person to be on there who hasn't slammed. And I think most people on Def Poetry have won slams or done well in slams. And, all of them, except the special guest stars, the celebrities, are writing slam poems and performing slam poems on Def Poetry, so to me, Def Poetry is still extremely slam-informed, and I think it will probably always be. What they say about Def Poetry is that it wants to bring an urban feel. And to me, they don't mean black or Latino, or non-white. What they really mean is, a rhythm of poetry that comes out of the Nuyorican Poets Cafe, that came out of the slams.

In a 2005 interview, Bob Holman, who founded the Nuyorican Poets Cafe's poetry slam and appeared on Season 4 of the show, applauded Def Poetry, noting:

I'm real happy poetry is on television. My hat is off to Russell Simmons, who has found a way to get poems on HBO in a way that feeds his own business. It gives him the back credentials for his hip-hop label, and at the same time he's magnanimous towards the art of poetry, giving us a place like that. It's a great, great moment, just as Def Poetry Jam on Broadway was a great moment, too. Not since Ntozake Shange's For Colored Girls Who Have Considered Suicide When the Rainbow Is Enuf has a poem like that been on the stage.

However, Marc Smith, the founder of the Poetry Slam movement, is more critical of the program. Smith decries the intense commercialization of the poetry slam, and refers to Def Poetry as "an exploitive entertainment [program that] diminished the value and aesthetic of performance poetry."

In November 2002, a live stage production, Russell Simmons Def Poetry Jam, opened on Broadway. Directed by Stan Lathan, the show featured poets Beau Sia, Suheir Hammad, Staceyann Chin, Lemon, Mayda Del Valle, Georgia Me, Black Ice, Poetri Smith, and Steve Coleman. The show ran on Broadway until May 2003, and won a 2003 Tony Award for Best Special Theatrical Event. The show subsequently toured both nationally and internationally.

Def Poetry premiered on HBO in 2002 and the latest season to air (Season 6) premiered in February 2007. As of summer 2008, there has been no word about the possibility of a Season 7. Starting in 2008, producers of Def Poetry (including Simmons, Stan Lathan, and Kamilah Forbes) developed and broadcast the HBO poetry show Brave New Voices, which is stylistically similar to Def Poetry, with teenage poets competing and backstage scenes.

== Episode index ==
=== Season 1 (2002) ===
==== Episode 1 ====
- Steve Colman – I Wanna Hear a Poem
- Georgia Me – Full Figure Potential
- Vanessa Hidary - Culture Bandit
- Lemon – Shine
- Nikki Giovanni – Talk to Me Poem, I Think I've Got the Blues
- Black Ice – Bigger Than Mine?
- Suheir Hammad – First Writing Since

==== Episode 2 ====
- Taylor Mali – What Teachers Make
- Yellow Rage – Listen Asshole
- Jewel – Poem Song
- Flow Mentalz – They Call Me Drama
- Sonia Sanchez – Poem to Some Women
- Shihan – This Type Love
- Dawn Saylor – When I Was 14
- Kayo – Who Am I?

==== Episode 3 ====
- Cedric the Entertainer – Untitled
- Sarah Jones – Your Revolution
- Beau Sia – Give Me a Chance
- Willie Perdomo – How Beautiful We Really Are
- Abyss – God Gave Me Grey Skies
- The Last Poets – Take Your Time
- IN-Q – When Hip-Hop Was Fun
- J. Ivy – I Need To Write

==== Episode 4 ====
- Mayda Del Valle – Descendancy
- Poetri – Money
- Jessica Care Moore – Warriors Walk Alone
- Dave Chappelle – The Corner Store
- Amiri Baraka – from Why is We Americans?
- Liza Jessie Peterson – Ice Cream Fiend
- Kevin Coval – Family Feud

=== Season 2 (2003) ===
==== Episode 1 ====
- Beau Sia – Asian Invasion
- Jason Carney – Southern Heritage
- Thea Monyee – Woman to Woman
- Sekou Sundiata – Come on and Bring on the Reparations
- Marty McConnell – Give Me One Good Reason to Die
- Twin Poets – Dreams are Illegal in the Ghetto
- Jamie Foxx – Off the Hizzle for Shizzle

==== Episode 2 ====
- Danny Hoch – Corner Talk, September
- Patricia Smith – Skinhead
- Dante Basco – Nikki
- Maggie Estep – Emotional Idiot
- Black Ice – Truth Is
- Kent Foreman – Epiphany
- Roger Bonair-Agard – How the Ghetto Loves Us Back
- Erykah Badu – Friends, fans, and artists must meet

==== Episode 3 ====
- Lemon – Where I'm From and A Toast
- Bassey Ikpi – Sometimes silence is the loudest kind of noise
- Taylor Mali – Totally like whatever, you know?
- Regie Cabico – What kind of guys are attracted to me
- Haki R. Madhubuti – The B Network
- Rat Sack – I'm Losing You
- Talib Kweli

==== Episode 4 ====
- Ishle Yi Park – All I have ever done is write you love poems
- Shihan – Say What?
- Suheir Hammad – Not Your Erotic, Not Your Exotic
- Big Poppa E – Wussy Boy
- La Bruja – WTC
- Anthony Morales – Story Avenue Stuck
- Amalia Ortiz – Some Days
- Oscar Brown Jr. – I Apologize

==== Episode 5 ====
- Felipe Luciano – Jibaro, My Pretty Nigger
- MuMs – Ploylessness
- Amanda Diva – Hot Shit
- Malik Yusef – I Spit
- Asha Bandele – Morning Was My Mentor
- Malcolm Jamal Warner – I Love My Woman

==== Episode 6 ====
- Sekou the Misfit – I'm a Rapper
- Steve Connell – Why Not Wine Coolers
- Georgia Me – NigGods
- Louis Reyes Rivera – Bullet Cry
- Jessica Care Moore – I'm a Hip Hop Cheerleader
- Keith Murray – Man Child.

==== Episode 7 ====
- Denizen Kane – Lost and Found
- Staceyann Chin – If Only Out of Vanity
- Big Rube – Alphabet Acrobat
- Wood Harris – Night Song
- Goldie – No title
- Regie Gibson – For James Marshall Hendrix
- Joy Harjo – A Poem to Get Rid of Fear
- Linton Kwesi Johnson – If I Was a Top-notch Poet

=== Season 3 (2004) ===
==== Episode 1 ====
- Black Ice – Lone Soldier
- Rives – Sign Language
- Helena D. Lewis – Stank Breath
- Poem-cees – Power
- Mutabaruka – Dis Poem
- Daniel Beaty – Duality Duel
- Rupert Estanislao – Empress
- Jill Scott – Nothing is for Nothing
- Suheir Hammad – We Spent the 4th of July in Bed

==== Episode 2 ====
- Mayda Del Valle and Lemon – Tito Puente
- Flaco Navaja – Kids Don't Play
- Gemineye – Poetic Bloodline
- Ursula Rucker – Get Ready
- Michael Ellison – Light Skin-did
- Ishle Park – Pussy
- Ras Baraka – American Poem
- Dana Gilmore – Wife, Woman, Friend
- Common – God is Freedom

==== Episode 3 ====
- Poetri – Krispy Kreme
- Emanuel Xavier – Tradiciones
- Marc Bamuthi Joseph – For Pop
- Richard Montoya – Miami
- Vanessa Hidary – The Hebrew Mamita
- Danny Hoch – PSA
- Bassey Ikpi – Homeward
- Lemon – Gangsta MCs
- Steve Colman – Terrorist Threat

==== Episode 4 ====
- Black Ice & Staceyann Chin – Jammin
- Rock Baby – Titty Man
- Alix Olson – Women Before
- Mike 360 – Twilight Zone
- Cheryl James – We Follow Your Lead
- Shappy – I Am That Nerd
- Jonzi D – 3000 Casualties of War
- Amalia Ortiz – Cat Calls
- Jimmy Santiago Baca – from Healing Earthquakes ("Twelve")

==== Episode 5 ====
- Roger Bonair-Agard – For Trent Lott
- Frenchie – Fucking Ain't Conscious
- Geoff Trenchard – Of Copper Chipped Teeth
- Chinaka Hodge – Barely Audible
- Quincy Troupe – Forty One Seconds in June, in Salt Lake City, Utah (for Michael Jordan)
- Dufflyn – Single Life
- MuMs – Brooklyn Queen
- Kevin Coval – Jam Master J
- Beau Sia – Love

==== Episode 6 ====
- Shihan – Sick and Tired
- Jason Carney – Out Here
- Gina Loring – Somewhere There Is a Poem
- Kanye West – Self Conscious
- Jamie DeWolf (formerly Jamie Kennedy) – Grim Fairy Tale
- Bao Phi – You Bring Out the Vietnamese in Me
- Roscoe P. Coldchain – Trouble
- Mayda Del Valle – Mami's Makin' Mambo
- Buju Banton – How Long

==== Episode 7 ====
- Maggie Estep – Happy
- Malak Salaam – Warrior's Love
- Joel Chmara – Sweet Tooth Tollbooth School Year
- Flowmentalz – The Payphone
- Saul Williams – Coded Language
- Georgia Me – Hit Like a Man
- Deb Young – Children of a Lesser God
- Smokey Robinson – A Black American

=== Season 4 (2005) ===
==== Episode 1 ====
- Daniel Beaty – Knock, Knock
- Rives – Kite
- Nafessa Monroe – White
- Mark Gonzales – As with Most Men
- Zena Edwards – Laugh
- Oscar Brown Jr. – Children of Children
- Amalia Ortiz – Women of Juarez
- Black Ice – Or Die
- MC Lyte – I Was Born

==== Episode 2 ====
- Gemineye – What Are You Fighting For?
- Bonnie – My Man
- Javon Johnson – Elementary
- Suheir Hammad – What I Will
- Rachel and George McKibbons – Multi-tasking
- Vanessa Hidary – Fling Gone Awry
- Flowmentalz – Constipation
- Nikki Patin – Sweat
- Nikky Finney – Girlfriends Train
- Kanye West – 18 Years

==== Episode 3 ====
- Bassey Ikpi – Diallo
- John S. Hall – America Kicks Ass
- Tish Benson – Fifth Word Email
- Kelly Tsai – Mao
- Tracy Morgan – Feeling Fucked Up
- Will Bell – So I Run
- Morris Stegosaurus – Big Man II
- Dawn Saylor – Take You To Brooklyn
- Michael Eric Dyson – Intellectual MCs
- KRS-One and Doug E. Fresh – 2nd Quarter

==== Episode 4 ====
- Poetri – Dating Myself
- Julian Curry – Nigger, Niggas, Niggaz
- Ishle Park – Open Letter to Soldier
- Taylor Mali – Like Lily Like Wilson
- Adele Givens – That Shit Ain't Funny
- Kevin Coval – My g-dself Loose
- Yolanda Kae Wilkinson – Circa Valentine's Day
- Amir Sulaiman – Danger
- Floetry – Everybody Heard

==== Episode 5 ====
- Lemon – Love Poem
- Regie Cabico – You Bring Out the Writer in Me
- Rafael Casal – Abortion
- Kim Fields – How Come
- Reg E. Gaines – I Don't Feel Like Writing
- Jon Goode – Barbara
- Dana Gilmore – Wife, Woman, Friend, Pt. 2
- Rita Dove – Black on a Saturday Night
- Talib Kweli – Lonely People

==== Episode 6 ====
- Flaco Navaja – Revolution
- Liza Jesse Peterson – Waitress
- Robert Karimi – Get Down with Your Catholic Muslim Self
- Triple Black – Love Poems
- Bonafide Rojas – In front of the Class
- Laura "Piece" Kelly – Central District
- BessKepp – Rotten Pomegranates
- Michael Franti – Rock the Nation
- Ruby Dee – Tupac

==== Episode 7 ====
- Georgia Me – Bitch Ass Nigga
- Jus Cus – Homeland Security
- J. Ivy – Dear Father
- Marlon Esquerra – Morning Papers
- Marvin Tate – My Life to the Present
- Martin Espada – Imagine the Angels of Bread
- Alix Olson – America on Sale
- Mos Def – Pornographic Content
- Ani DiFranco – Coming Up
- Mike Epps – I Love the Hood

==== Episode 8 ====
- Mayda Del Valle – Hood Days
- Andy Buck – *69
- Faraji Salim – Star Spangled Banner
- Bob Holman – Rock & Roll Mythology
- Patrick Washington – Letter to the Editor
- Tara Betts – Switch
- Paul Flores – Brown Dreams
- muMs – The Truth Parts I & II
- Buttaflysoul – Queer Eye
- Dead Prez – 4 the Hood

==== Episode 9 ====
- Beau Sia – I'm So Deep
- Aysiha Knight – Until
- Buddy Wakefield – Convenience Store
- Shihan – The Auction Network
- Miguel Algarin – Met Walking
- Kendra Urdang – To Every Man Who Never Called Himself a Feminist
- Speech – Night Time Demons
- Red Storm – My Debut
- Universes (poetic theatre ensemble) (Steven, Mildred & Gamal) – Don't Front
- Common – A Letter to the Law

==== Episode 10 ====
- Tommy Bottoms – Basic Economics
- Staceyann Chin – Three Frenzied Days
- Joe Hernandez-Kolski – Cool
- Marc Batmuthi Joseph – Move
- Denizen Kane – Love Song
- Aya De Leon – Cellulite
- Musiq – Pieces of this Life
- Mos Def – My Life is Real
- Yusef Komunyakaa – The Sure Beat
- Beau Sia, Georgia Me, Suheir Hammad – First Taste

=== Season 5 (2006) ===
==== Episode 1 ====
- J. Ivy – Never Let Me Down
- Dahlak Brathwaite – Just Another Routine Check
- Claudia Alick – Employed Poor
- Black Ice – Imagine
- Gideon Grody-Patinkin – Touching
- Avery Brooks – from Purlie Victorious (by Ossie Davis)
- Lauryn Hill – Motives and Thoughts
- Rachel McKibbens – After School Special
- Dave Chappelle – Fuck Ashton Kutcher and How I Got the Lead On Jeopardy

==== Episode 2 ====
- Al Letson – The Ball the Rim and Him
- Dan Sully and Tim Stafford – Death From Below
- Georgia Me – For Your Protection
- John Legend – Again
- Caroline Harvey – Spoons
- Bounty Killer – Look Into My Eyes;
- Bassey Ikpi – I Want to Kiss You
- Will "Da Real One" Bell – Diary of the Reformed
- Alicia Keys – P.O.W.

==== Episode 3 ====
- Reg E. Gaines and Savion Glover – Pawn Shop
- Tommy Chunn – Computer Wordplay
- Scorpio Blues – Second Guessing
- Gemineye – Penny for Your Thoughts
- Emanuel Xavier – Nueva York
- Mayda Del Valle – To All the Boys I've Loved Before
- Rev. Run – Peter Piper
- Aulelei Love – Same Cell, A Poem for Women in Prison
- Mike Booker – Hoodology
- Smokey Robinson – Gang Bangin'

==== Episode 4 ====
- The Poem-cees – Cheatin'
- Geoff Trenchard – Ode to my Bathroom
- Marty McConnell – Instructions for a Body
- Nikki Giovanni – Nikki-Rosa
- Roger Bonair-Agard – Calypso
- Joaquin Zihuatanejo – This is a Suit
- Ishle Park – Sa-I-Gu
- Willie Perdomo – Nigger-Reecan Blues
- Floetry x2 – Fantasize

==== Episode 5 ====
- Poetri – Driving
- Sharrif Simmons— Fuck What You Heard
- Michael D. Ellison – Mezeker Means to Remember
- Phylicia Rashad – On Status (by Vivian Ayers)
- Ratsack – Free the Toes
- Abyss – She
- Kevin Coval – Nothing Fight
- Mollie Angelheart – Psychotic Bitch
- Flomentalz – Talkin' to God
- Thea Monyee and Gaknew – A Different World

==== Episode 6 ====
- Wyclef Jean – Immigrant
- Nayeli Adorador-Knudsen – Priceless
- Michael Cirelli – Love Song for Kelis
- M'Reld – Ready for Love
- Red Storm – Snake in the Grass
- Kelly Tsai – Aftershocks
- Paul Mabon – The Toothbrush
- Kevin Derrig – Andrew
- Mighty Mike McGee – Like
- Narubi Selah – Uncle Benz
- Ise Lyfe – Popular Dirt

==== Episode 7 ====
- Kanye West – Bittersweet
- Ursula Rucker – What a Woman Must Do
- Rafael Casal – Barbie and Ken 101
- Terry Creech – Lost Bird
- Thadra Sheridan – Bad Boyfriend
- Beau Sia – Hip Hop
- Shihan – In Response
- Sonia Sanchez – Our Vision Is Our Voice
- Amir Sulaiman – She Said, I Prefer A Broken Neck...
- Lemon and Flaco – Boriquas

==== Episode 8 ====
- Preach R Sun – Cotton
- Steve Connell and Sekou The Misfit – America Calls
- Big Poppa E – Poem For A Friend
- Amanda Diva – 40 Emcees
- Al B. Back – Super Negro
- Sista Queen – Try Being A Lady
- Jerry Quickley – 3-Part Bitter X-girlfriend #167249-B
- Oscar Brown, Jr. – This Beach
- Staceyann Chin – A City In Tragedy
- Brother J – Atlan
- Common – Be Known

==== Episode 9 ====
- Suheir Hammad – Mike Check
- Lemon – Poor People
- Tamara Blue – Thick Chicks
- Rives – Op-talk
- Otep Shamaya– Dedicated To My Enemy
- Heru Ptah – Why
- Sharon Olds – Self Portrait, Rear View
- Perre Shelton – Dandelion
- Consequence – Friend Zone
- Jason Carney – Our Soldiers
- Black Thought – Untitled

==== Episode 10 ====
- Gina Loring – You Move Me
- Rock Baby – That Sweet That Funk
- Chinaka Hodge – Cousin
- Denizen Kane – Patriot Act
- Sekou Sundiata – Amman
- Kristiana Colon – From the Clay
- Jimmy Tran – Mediocre Penis
- Flaco Navaja – Dimple
- Eve Ensler – My Father's House
- Black Ice, Poetri and Shihan – We Are Men

=== Season 6 (2007) ===
==== Episode 1 ====
- DMX – The Industry
- Big Mike – Sexy
- Asia – The Waiting Hour
- Dan Vaughn & Dasha Kelly – Six Million
- Kelly Tsai – Grey Matter
- Red Storm – Black Barbie Doll
- Shanelle Gabriel – Why I Love You
- Idris Goodwin – What is They Feedin' Our Kids
- Jill Scott – Ain't a Ceiling

==== Episode 2 ====
- Dahlak Braithwaite – Peculiar Evolution
- Skim – Your Eyes
- Eamon Mahone & Paul Graham – Black Irish
- Tahani Salah – Hate
- George Watsky – V For Virgin
- Shannon Leigh – Sudanese Children
- Pat's Justice – Innocent Criminal
- Lyfe Jennings – Rough Stuff
- Matisyahu – Late Night In The Field
- Talib Kweli – Hell

==== Episode 3 ====
- Sarah Kay – Hands
- Riva & Sciryl – My Best Friend (Hip Hop)
- Rafael Casal – First Week Of A Break-Up
- Meilani Clay – Lost
- Shihan – Father's Day
- Shannon Matesky – My Space
- Carlos Andres Gomez – What's Genocide
- Carole King – Touchstone
- Natalie Stewart – Her Story
- Jamal Joseph – Ricky Do & The 4th Of July

==== Episode 4 ====
- Oveous Maximus – Salcedo's Breakdown
- Sonya Renee Taylor – Connections
- Anis Mojgani – For Those Who Can Still Ride an Airplane for the First Time
- Rives – Dirty Talk
- Mush – Next Wednesday
- Joe Hernandez-Kolski – No Disclaimers
- African-American Shakespear – Will You Be There
- David Banner – What About Us
- Sunni Patterson – We Made It

==== Episode 5 ====
- Big Poppa E – Propers
- Bassey Ikpi – Apology To My Unborn
- Alvin Lau – What Tiger Said
- Saddi Kali – Goin' Platinum In 2 Days
- Liza Garza – My Everything
- Lamont Carey – I Can't Read
- Brian Dykstra – Pushing Bush
- Vanessa Hidary – Phd In Him
- Basikknowledge – Numbers
- George Clinton – Dope Dog

==== Episode 6 ====
- Black Ice – The Ugly Show
- Mayda Del Valle – The porn industry
- Steve Colman – I Want To Eat Your Pu**y
- Georgia Me – The Promiseland
- Beau Sia – Back To The Now
- Staceyann Chin – Nails
- Poetri – Monsters In My Stomach
- Suheir Hammad – Daddy's Song
- Lemon – Experience
- Nelly Furtado – Nevis

=== Reboot ===
Chance the Rapper will host this season.
