= Big Mike =

Big Mike is a nickname of:

== People with the nickname ==
- Mike Abrams (criminal) (died 1898), American underworld criminal
- Michael Clemente (1908–1987), American mobster
- Michael Clarke Duncan (1957–2012), American actor sometimes credited as "Big Mike" Duncan
- Michael Elgin (born 1986), Canadian professional wrestler
- Mike Holmes (born 1963), Canadian contractor-builder and TV personality
- Michael Hossack (1946–2012), American drummer for the band The Doobie Brothers
- Michael Lynche (born 1983), American singer and American Idol contestant
- Mike Mahoney (first baseman) (1873–1940), American baseball player
- Michele Miranda (1896–1973), American mobster
- Michael Oher (born 1986), American National Football League player
- Michael Sarno (born 1958), American mobster
- Black Mike Winage (1870–1977), Serbian-Canadian miner, pioneer and adventurer, known early on as "Big Mike"

== Fictional characters ==
- Big Mike (Chuck), in the American television series Chuck
