= Four in the Morning =

Four in the Morning may refer to:

== Songs ==
- "[It's] Four in the Morning" (1971), by Faron Young
- "Four in the Morning" (1985), by Night Ranger on album 7 Wishes
- "4 in the Morning" (2006), by Gwen Stefani

== Other media ==
- Four in the Morning (1938 film), a French comedy film
- Four in the Morning (1965 film), a British film
- Four in the Morning (TV series), a Canadian TV series
- "The 4 a.m. mystery", a TED talk by poet John Rives
