= Russell Simmons' Def Poetry Jam on Broadway =

- Original language: English
- Subject: Slam poetry, performance poetry

Premiere
- Date: November 14, 2002; 23 years ago
- Place: Broadway, New York City
- Directed by: Stan Lathan

Russell Simmons' Def Poetry Jam on Broadway is 2002 slam poetry Broadway show inspired by the Def Poetry Jam television series and produced by Russell Simmons.

The show was Russell Simmons' first Broadway venture.

The show's original cast of spoken word poets featured Staceyann Chin, Mayda Del Valle, Steve Colman, Suheir Hammad, Black Ice, Georgia Me, Beau Sia.

The show closed in 2003.
