= Dahlak Brathwaite =

American performance artist

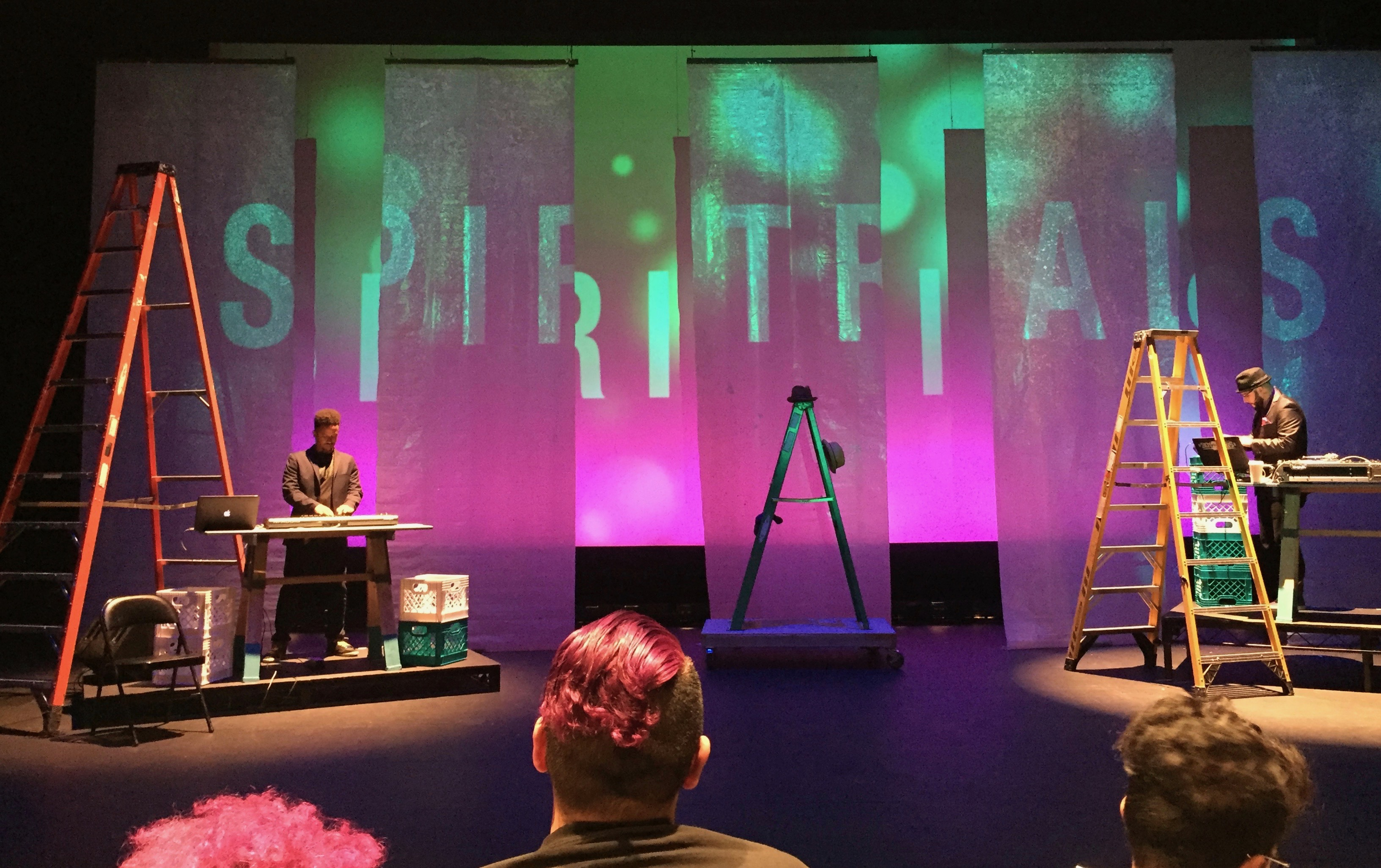
- Brathwaite, at left, preparing for a production of Spiritrials in 2017.
- Born: 1986 (age 39–40)
- Occupations: Performance artist, spoken-word poet, actor, musician, and writer
- Known for: HBO's Def Poetry Jam, Spiritrials

Dahlak Brathwaite (born 1986) is a hip-hop-rooted performance artist, spoken-word poet, actor, musician, and writer. He has toured the United States with his one-man show, Spiritrials, since 2015. He first gained prominence when he appeared twice on HBO's Def Poetry Jam. As a CalArts artist-in-residence he has further developed Spiritrials with director Roberta Uno and choreographer Toran Moore to create the project Try/Step/Trip which he has performed at venues such as Chicago's Museum of Contemporary Art, San Francisco's CalArts Center for New Performance, and the American Conservatory Theater. Since 2004, Brathwaite has toured over 200 colleges throughout the United States and Europe with the ill-Literacy artists collective and been a featured performer at the Los Angeles Get Down Festival. He has toured nationally and internationally with the hip-hop theater production of Word Becomes Flesh and Scourge, both under the direction of Marc Bamuthi Joseph. Additional collaborations include a track with acclaimed Bay Area rapper George Watsky and performances with Princess Cut. Brathwaite is a presenter through the CalArts initiative ArtChangeUS: Arts in a Changing America and a U.S. State Department International Exchange Fellowship's OneBeat Fellow, through which he has performed for the State Department's hip-hop diplomacy program, Next Level. The role, which placed him on Team Uzbekistan, has taken him to Guatemala, Israel, Nigeria, the Philippines, Turkey, and the Dominican Republic.

== Early life ==
Brathwaite is a Sacramento native and currently resides in Long Beach, California.

=== Religion ===
Brathwaite was raised Catholic which segued into what he describes as "a traditional Black church where folks, you know, catch the Holy Ghost and run up to the altar and speak in tongues." This experience caused him to "contextualize Christianity in the historical sense," testing, and ultimately losing, his belief in the faith. It was with his encounter with the law, having been racially profiled and brought to court, that solidified his agnosticism, and that he was no longer Christian; the experience reignited his troubled sensibility over rituals that are never explained. Brathwaite has cited Judaism as a religion that he believes does a better job at linking historical and biblical events to religious practice. In an April 2019 Medium article, Brathwaite describes his current spiritual practice:

"On every good day, on every day that I'm not rushed, I get on my floor and I meditate for 15 to 20 minutes, sometimes longer. Then get on my knees and stretch, and then pray. And sometimes when I do it so much, that that's when the ritual has to be made new again.

"I started those rituals when I started this play and that was my way of sampling. Because meditation was an Eastern practice, and the way that I stretch probably looks like Islamic prayer to some people, and then I pray sometimes just in that Catholic form. Lately, even though my prayers are structured and I have a thing that I usually say all the time, I've been trying to invoke kind of that Pastor spirit, that spirit that I've learned from the black church, in terms of a crazy desperate plea for more faith."

"Art is a type of spirituality for me. As I'm trying to discover what art does again, that is that prayer that I'm asking for: more faith, to believe in more, to believe in what I don't see and what I can't plan out."

== Education ==
Brathwaite attended the University of California, Davis, earning his bachelor's degrees in English and Dramatic Art in 2008. While a student, he and Adriel Luis, Nico Cary, Ruby Veridiano-Ching, and others formed the spoken-word group ill-Literacy. As of 2019, Brathwaite and the group still tour. Also while a UCD student, Brathwaite appeared twice on HBO's Russell Simmons presents Def Poetry Jam, on which he shared a bill with Talib Kweli, Lauryn Hill, Lyfe Jennings, Dave Chappelle, and others. During this time, Brathwaite performed in UC Davis Department of Theatre & Dance productions such as The Island, directed by Professor Peter Lichtenfels, and participated in projects like a Youth Radio series helmed by reporter Anyi Howell.

== Career ==
Brathwaite's works reflect the modern age's struggle with the intersection of race, religion, law enforcement, and mass incarceration. Fresh out of college in 2008, Brathwaite was pulled over by a police officer while driving in a case of racial profiling. The officer found four stems of hallucinogenic mushrooms in Brathwaite's vehicle and arrested him; Brathwaite was subsequently made out to be an addict in court, even though he was not, and was placed in a court-mandated drug rehabilitation program, with the threat of a felony hanging over him if he did not comply. This provided the impetus for his 70-minute one-man show and LP by the same name, Spiritrials, which he developed in 2010 and proceeded to tour across the United States. As of May 2019, he had performed the show in 35 U.S. states. Venues have included Los Angeles's REDCAT Theatre; Sonoma State University's Persons Theater; Arizona's Mesa Arts Center; Price Center at the University of California, San Diego; Georgia Tech; Florida's Asolo Repertory Theatre; the Greenway Court Theatre; Connecticut's University of Saint Joseph; and Montana's Myrna Loy Theatre. Also by May 2019, Brathwaite had brought the show to Brazil and South Africa.

Since 2013, he has been touring nationally and internationally with a production of Word Becomes Flesh, playing venues including the University of Massachusetts, Amherst's Bowker Auditorium; Northeastern University; the Theater Alliance of Washington, D.C.'s Anacostia Playhouse, the University of Chicago; Virginia's Middlebury University; Philadelphia's Painted Bride Art Center; Intermedia Arts in Minneapolis, and other venues.

In 2025, Brathwaite announced his new musical, Ashwa, would premiere at Off-Broadway's York Theatre.

== Awards and honors ==
- Charles MacArthur Award for Outstanding New Play or Adaptation for Long Way Down
- Nominee for 2019 United States Artists Fellowship
- Winner of the Brave New Voices International Poetry Slam 2018
- U.S. State Department International Exchange Fellowship's OneBeat Fellow 2014–2018

== Discography ==
- Spiritrials (2012)
- Of No Consequence (2012)
- Live From The Boondocks: Commencement (2008)
- Dual Consciousness (2007)
