= Michael D. Ellison =

African-American recording artist

- Also known as: MIKE-E
- Genres: Hip hop, slam poetry
- Occupations: Poet, Actor, MC, Songwriter, Activist
- Label: Wendemé Records
- Member of: Afroflow
- Website: www.afroflow.com

Michael D. Ellison (aka MIKE-E, Mike Ellis, Michael Ellison) is an African American recording artist. He is well known for his slam poetry performances and his involvement with the Detroit Concert of Colors annual event.

== Biography ==
Ellison was born in Ethiopia to expatriate African American parents who lived and worked in Ethiopia's capital Addis Ababa.

== Performance work ==
Ellison is noted for his slam poetry and hip-hop performances, which he performs under the name MIKE-E as well as with his group called AfroFlow. He has performed in several venues such as HBO's Def Poetry, for the National Football League, for Toyota, and for the NAACP. MIKE-E's music was also used by the Barack Obama presidential campaign.

Ellison had a narration role and also appeared in the film Standing in the Shadows of Motown. He has also appeared as a part of marketing campaign for the urban fashion brand Pelle Pelle as a part of their 25th anniversary.

== Concert of Colors involvement ==
As a part of his Detroit-based work, Ellison has been a regular participant in the city's Concert of Colors annual event, which emphasizes both world talent in addition to performances from performers originally from Detroit. Ellison has been called a highlight of the event One of Ellison's performances called Stepping into Destiny demonstrated various transitions in American music from field holler work songs to blues and featured performances from Kenny Watson, saxophonist DeShawn Jones, and drummer Eric Gaston. Previously, Ellison's production was sold out and many attendants were unable to attend, causing organizers to plan a separate performance was held at Detroit's Scarab Club.

== The AfroFlow Tour ==
MIKE-E’s performances addressing the disproportionate tobacco advertising aimed at youth, ethnic and economically challenged populations brought him to the attention of the American Cancer Society (ACS). In 2007, the ACS partnered with MIKE-E, sponsoring the Afroflow Tour. Entering its fourth year in 2010, the tour of U.S. colleges and universities, middle and high schools, churches, communities and music venues was intended to engage youth, young adults and families nationwide in the fight against cancer, as well as tobacco prevention and cessation. MIKE-E also wrote, produced and appeared in a series of public service announcements for the ACS, one of which (Victorious) features his aunt, a cancer and heart transplant survivor.
