= Afroflow =

Musical group

AfroFlow is a musical group, heavily influenced by African beats through drums, spoken word, and call and response. The group started the Afroflow tour in 2006. They have partnered with the American Cancer Society (ACS) to speak out against the tobacco industry and to reach out to young adults about the dangers of tobacco use. The group consists of Mike-E, DJ Invisible, Kenny Watson, and Sowande Keita.

== Band members ==
- Mike-E – Spoken Word
- DJ Invisible – DJ (Carl Hollier)
- Kenny Watson – Vocalist
- Sowande Keita – African Percussionist

Mike-E was the one who started this group. He has already been performing when he decided to get together a group of individuals to spread the word on creating a cancer-free world. His music has even been used by the Barack Obama presidential campaign. Sowande Keita is the son of the Djembe player, King Sundiata Keita. King Sundiata was a master drummer and tuner of djembe, and played djembe with musicians including The Wailers and Carlos Santana. Sowande followed in his father's footsteps as a djembe master. DJ Invisible, Based out of Detroit, also tours with Pimp my Ride Xzibit and is a United States Music & Culture Ambassador DJ INvisible is also a Multi time Detroit Music Award Winner. Kenny Watson has performed with bands such as he Electrifying Monica Blaire, The Lovely L-RENE, Relativity, The D'sean Jones Quartet.

== Style of music ==
AfroFlow literally means "flowing from Africa". It recognizes where the music comes from and was also named out of respect for Fela Anikulapo-Kuti, who created a style of music called afrobeat. AfroFlow is, "the root of hip-hop, R&B, soul and gospel music." They incorporate all these styles into their music.

== Performances ==
During performances, AfroFlow is known for pulling people on stage from the audience. They believe that entertaining should be interactive and the crowd is a vital part of every performance. They have even brought audience member who are currently smoking up on stage to quit right on the spot.

== Acting ==
Mike-E also has 13 acting credits to his name, including small parts in The Butterfly Effect 3: Revelations, The Ides of March and Batman v Superman: Dawn of Justice. He also modeled Pelle Pelle clothing for an international print campaign.

== Partnership with American Cancer Society ==
It all started when Mike-E was asked to perform at an American Cancer Society conference for the South-Atlantic Division. Here, he did a combination of hip-hop and spoken word to entertain and educate and to create awareness about cancer and the effects of tobacco use. The American Cancer Society realized the great partnership that could be formed to help spread the message. From that point, Mike-E traveled to hospitals, cafes, middle schools, along with a variety of other locations before they decided to take it national. Mike-E wrote poems about the tobacco industry long before his partnership with ACS. He states, "I believe that tobacco companies are knowingly engaging in legalized genocide." AfroFlow has committed their entire work to educating others about the harmful effects of tobacco use and educating other on how to stay healthy. In 2008, AfroFlow performed at the Great Lakes Regional Summit. It was here, with the help of others, that they were inspired to create a Fight Back song. The song includes the three main elements of Relay for Life: Celebrate. Remember. Fight Back. Mike-E has also appeared in a variety of Public Service Announcements for ACS.
