= All You Can Do =

Studio album by Watsky
- Released: August 12, 2014
- Recorded: 2013–2014
- Genre: Alternative hip-hop
- Length: 57:43
- Labels: Steel Wool Media, Welk Music Group
- Producers: Anderson .Paak, Mister Carmack, Mikos da Gawd, LODEF

Watsky chronology
Cardboard Castles (2013)	All You Can Do (2014)	x Infinity (2016)

Singles from All You Can Do
- 1. "Whoa Whoa Whoa" Released: June 10, 2014; 2. "Ink Don't Bleed" Released: June 24, 2014; 3. "Right Now" Released: July 15, 2014; 4. "All You Can Do" Released: August 5, 2014

All You Can Do is the third studio album by American spoken word artist and rapper Watsky. The 16-track album was released on August 12, 2014. Watsky said in a YouTube video that he wanted the album to be a tribute to his parents, and that because of this, the album cover would be a photo of his father, poet Paul Watsky, and his cat, Saruman. During this video, he also gave a preview of a song, entitled Hand Over Hand featuring producer and rapper Anderson .Paak. The album was preceded by the single Whoa Whoa Whoa, produced by Anderson .Paak, Mr. Carmack, Mikos da Gawd, and Lo Def.

== Content ==
In the final episode of his Watsky Wednesdays YouTube blog series before he left for Warped Tour, Watsky revealed a little information about the content of All You Can Do. He explained that he recently had a seizure and he had to go on epilepsy medications to try to avoid any future seizures, and that before he had the seizure, he had written a song about prescription medications, Tears To Diamonds. He said of the song, "I wanted to write a balanced song about how prescription drugs are necessary, but there's so much fucked up shit that goes on." Topics he said he focuses on in this song include doctors getting kickback from the industry for prescribing these medications, the overprescription of medication, side effects, and that what would have been seen as a facet of somebody's personality 20 years ago is now being seen as medical disorders that are being highly medicated. He explained that he wanted to write this song because he felt like all the songs about the pharmaceutical industry are about how bad the industry is and that none of them balance it out with the fact that pharmaceuticals save some peoples lives.

He also explained that he deals with the "London situation" on it, referring to the 30-foot stage dive he made off of the lighting rig at the Warped Tour show in London in 2013, which left one man with minor injuries and another woman with a broken arm. He explained that he didn't speak on this too much because he didn't want it to seem like he was wallowing in it; he wanted to be able to address it but not let it consume the album.

He said that the album was a tribute to his mother and father: His father, Paul Watsky, is on the front cover with his cat Saruman; his mother is on the back cover. He explained that it is not only a tribute to his parents but also the kind of music they listened to when they were growing up, which is why there is so much psychedelic artwork in the deluxe physical copy.

== Singles ==
On June 10, 2014, the first single Whoa Whoa Whoa was released on iTunes. The video (starring Watsky, Jim Belushi, Chinaka Hodge, Bo Burnham & Julia Misaki) was also released on June 10, on Billboard.com. He explained in the final episode before his departure on Warped Tour for his vlog, Watsky Wednesdays, that his inspiration for Whoa Whoa Whoa was "to have a verbal flexing song", and he explained that he wanted this song as a song to be what Pale Kid Raps Fast was as a viral video. He explained that he wanted to make a song that included "elements of my personality and what I could do with wordplay, and had a catchy chorus. It's a song for people who feel like they're not getting their due respect from people." He went on to call Whoa Whoa Whoa "a silly song that's trying to prove people wrong that doubt you." The music video went on to reach a million views in the first ten days of its release on YouTube. It reached two million views in less than six weeks. As of February 25, 2021, the video has 26.4 million views.

On June 11, 2014, during the final episode before Warped Tour of his vlog Watsky Wednesdays, Watsky announced that the second single would be Ink Don't Bleed, featuring rapper Anderson .Paak. He said that the song is very different than Whoa Whoa Whoa.

On Twitter on July 13, 2014, he said that the third single from the album would be the song Right Now featuring Lisa Vitale, to be released the following Tuesday.

On Twitter on July 31, 2014, he said that he would be releasing his fourth and final single pre-album release, and it would be the title track All You Can Do, and later announced the song would be released on August 5. He also announced on his Facebook page that the album would be available for streaming on Rap Genius starting August 8 at midnight, eastern time.

== Release ==
Professional ratings
Review scores
Source	Rating
AllMusic	3/5 stars

The album was available on iTunes and Spotify as well as a limited edition physical copy and limited edition double-disc vinyl. In October 2019, the album was removed from streaming platforms for unknown reasons but has since been restored.

== Chart performance ==
The album debuted at number 33 on the Billboard 200, selling 10,000 copies in its first week.

== Track listing ==
This track list was confirmed with the iTunes Pre-Order on June 10, 2014, the day the album was made available for preorder.

No.	Title	Writer(s)	Producer(s)	Length
1.	"All You Can Do" (featuring Jimetta Rose)	George Watsky, Vicky Nguyen	Anderson .Paak	4:06
2.	"Stand for Something" (featuring Anderson .Paak)	Watsky, Pat Dimitri	Anderson .Paak	2:30
3.	"Bet Against Me"	Watsky, Jose Rios	Anderson .Paak	3:09
4.	"Whoa Whoa Whoa"	Watsky, Mikos Da Gawd	Anderson .Paak, Mr. Carmack, LODEF	3:07
5.	"Ink Don't Bleed" (featuring Anderson .Paak)	Watsky	Jarius Mozee	3:34
6.	"Right Now" (featuring Lisa Vitale)	Watsky, Dimitri	Anderson. Paak	3:14
7.	"My First Stalker"	Watsky, Rios, Max Miller-Loran	Anderson. Paak	1:30
8.	"The One"	Watsky, Kush Mody	Anderson. Paak	2:55
9.	"Boomerang" (featuring Ariana Deboo)	Watsky	Mikos Da Gawd, Mr. Carmack	2:51
10.	"Lets Get High and Watch Planet Earth"	Watsky, Brandon Anderson, Kelsey Gonzalez	Anderson .Paak, Mr. Carmack	3:24
11.	"Hand Over Hand" (featuring Anderson .Paak)	Watsky, Anderson, Rios	Anderson .Paak	4:38
12.	"Tears to Diamonds" (featuring Raquel Rodriguez)	Watsky, Dimitri	Anderson .Paak	3:24
13.	"Grass Is Greener"	Watsky	Anderson .Paak	3:44
14.	"Never Let It Die"	Watsky, Mody	Anderson .Paak	5:06
15.	"Sarajevo" (featuring Dia Frampton)	Watsky, Mody	Anderson .Paak	3:43
16.	"Cannonball" (featuring Stephen Stills)	Watsky, Mody	Anderson .Paak	6:40
Total length:				57:43
