= Lemon Andersen =

American poet (born 1975)

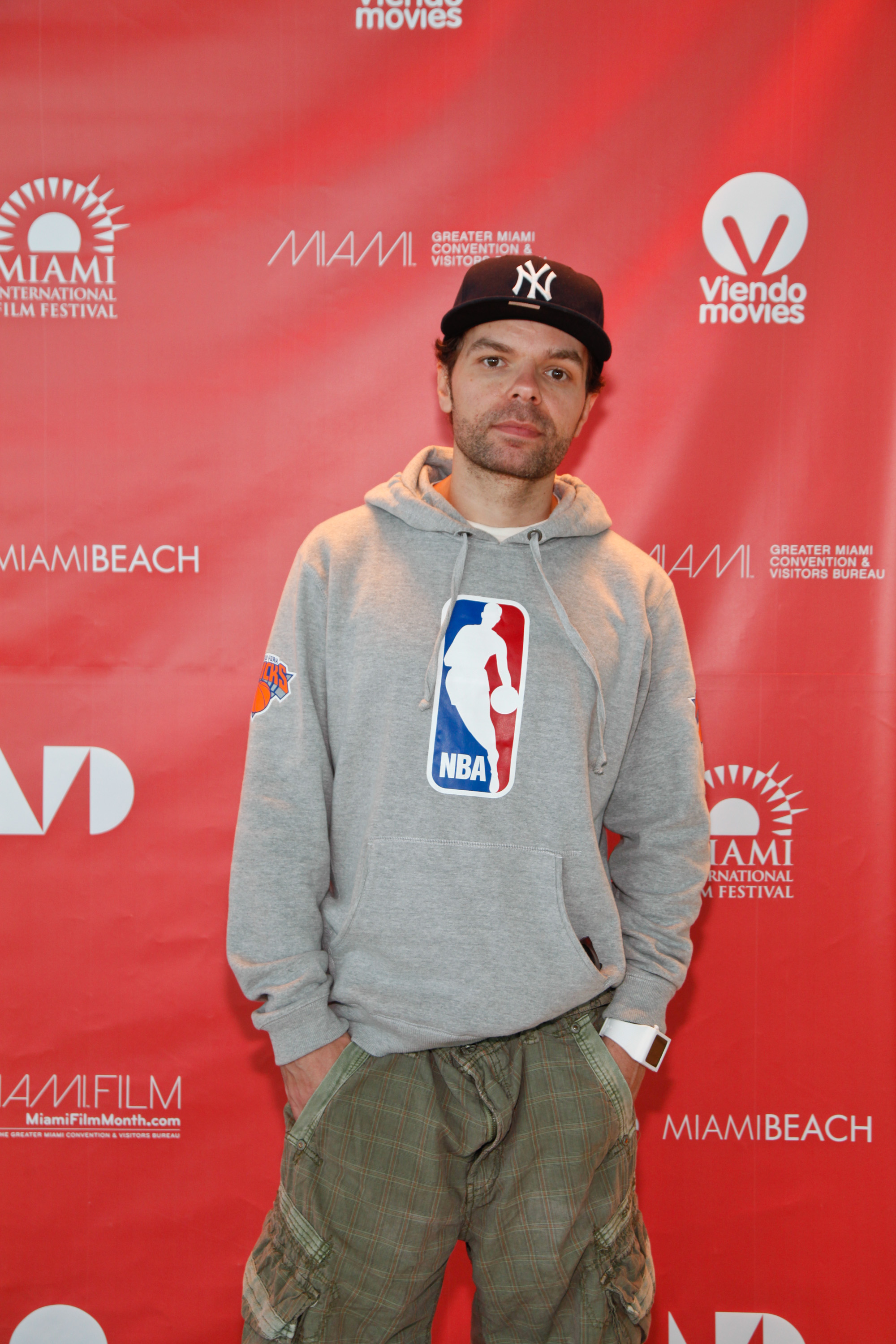
- Andersen at the 2012 Miami International Film Festival presentation of Lemon
- Born: Andrew Andersen; April 21, 1975 (age 51); Brooklyn, New York, U.S.
- Other names: Lemon, Lemon Anderson
- Occupations: Poet, spoken word artist, actor

Lemon Andersen (born Andrew Andersen; April 21, 1975) is an American poet, spoken word artist and actor. He is sometimes credited as Lemon. He is the author of County of Kings and the subject of the documentary Lemon. In his November 2011 TEDYouth talk Please don't take my Air Jordans, Lemon's performance of the title poem by Reg E. Gaines is followed by his own spoken-word riff on the influence of Gaines, Etheridge Knight, and other poets on his creative growth as a poet and spoken word artist.

== Early life ==
Born and raised in Brooklyn, New York, he still resides there. He is the son of Milagros "Mili" Quiñones, from Puerto Rico, and Peter Andersen, a Norwegian-American from Bensonhurst, Brooklyn. Growing up in poverty, as a teenager Lemon experienced the successive deaths of his stepfather, father, and mother from complications of heroin abuse and AIDS, leaving him and his older brother orphaned and forced to fend for themselves. Lemon became involved in serious crime, but was diverted through his passion first for hip hop and then acting, and a succession of mentors.

== Poetry ==
As a poet Lemon Andersen has the most aired episodes on HBO's Def Poetry, eight times in six seasons, and was an original cast member of the Russell Simmons Def Poetry Jam on Broadway (2002-2003), for which he won the Tony Award for Best Special Theatrical Event in 2003 and the Drama Desk nomination for Unique Theatrical Experience that same year. His poetry collections include Ready Made Real: Poems (2004) and County of Kings (2009), both of which were published independently by County of Kings Publishing.

== Spoken word ==
Andersen has performed spoken-word and theater for the last decade including at the Nuyorican Poets Cafe, Apollo Theater, Chicago Theater, and Hollywood’s Kodak Theatre. On July 2, 2005 he performed in front of 500,000 people at Philadelphia’s Live 8 concert. Nike also chose him to write a piece to help them sign LeBron James.

In 2012 he toured a one person show titled County of Kings: The Beautiful Struggle, which was developed and produced through The American Place Theatre's Literature to Life program. It was the grand prize winner in the 2010 New York Book Festival.

== Acting ==
In film, Lemon has worked with Spike Lee on four movies: Sucker Free City (2004), She Hate Me (2004), Inside Man (2006) (appearing opposite Denzel Washington and Clive Owen), and Miracle at St. Anna (2008). In 2009, he played Uncle Tommy in The Soloist, directed by Joe Wright. He In 2012 he was the subject of the documentary film Lemon, which appeared as the fourth episode in America's PBS Voces series on October 19, 2012.

Lemon Andersen's theater credits include Slanguage, directed by Jo Bonney, The Ride at PS 122, and U at the Mark Taper Forum. He was also the voice actor for Pharaoh, Boxcar and Axel in The Warriors and The Crowd of Liberty City in Grand Theft Auto IV.

== Playwriting ==
As a Baryshnikov Arts Center Resident Artist from November 26-December 1, 2012, Andersen worked with director Elise Thoron and sound designer Robert Kaplowitz on the score for his new play ToasT, focusing on African-American poetic narratives in the setting of Attica Prison at the time of the 1971 riots. ToasT was commissioned by the Sundance Institute and recently showed, as ToasT (Work in Progress), in Off-Broadway's Under the Radar Festival at The Public Theater in Lower Manhattan, New York.
