= Joe Hernandez-Kolski =

American actor, spoken word poet, comedian and hip-hop theater artist

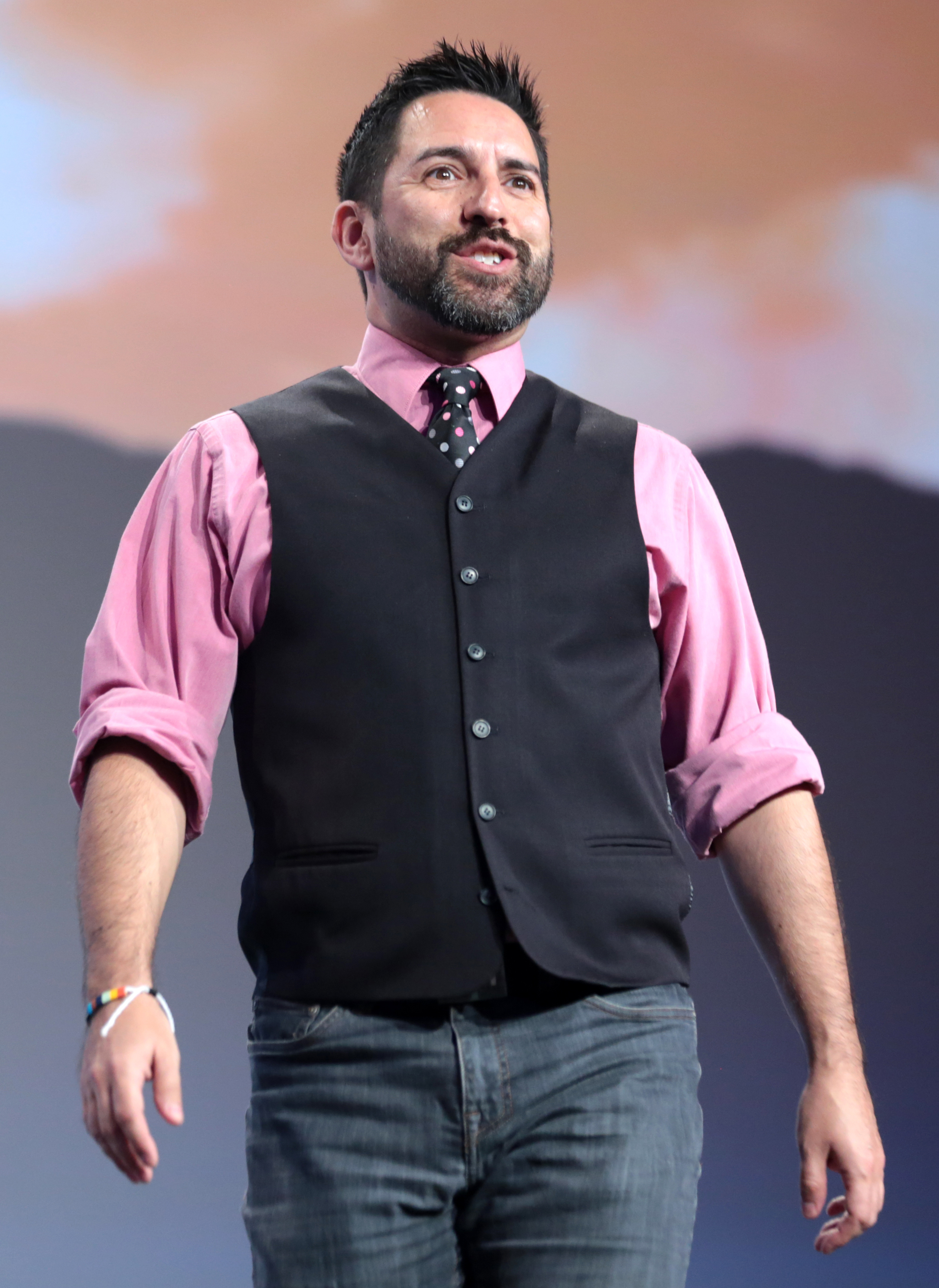
Hernandez-Kolski in 2017

Joe Hernandez-Kolski is an American actor, spoken word poet, comedian and hip-hop theater artist. He appeared on the fourth and sixth seasons of HBO's Def Poetry Jam.

== Early life and education ==
Hernandez-Kolski was born in Chicago, the son of Philip Edmund Kolski and Cynthia Marie Hernandez-Kolski. He is the oldest of two children. He began acting professionally as a child in Chicago, working with Chicago Actors Ensemble and Profiles Performance Ensemble. His first professional theater production was the Chicago premiere of Matt Williams' Between Daylight and Boonville.

Hernandez-Kolski graduated from Whitney M. Young Magnet High School. He then graduated from Princeton University with a degree in history.

== Career ==
Hernandez-Kolski moved to Los Angeles and acted in several theatrical productions, including the long-running Zoo District production of Mikhail Bulgakov's The Master and Margarita. Around the same time, Hernandez-Kolski began performing in the spoken word poetry scene.

In 2002, Hernandez-Kolski was cast in American Stage Theater Company's production of The Bomb-itty of Errors. This production led to a long-running series of performances, including a run at the Chicago Shakespeare Theater, The Edinburgh Festival Fringe (where the cast received the Stage Award for "Best Ensemble"), The Helix (Dublin) and the Ambassadors Theatre (London).

In 2004, Hernandez-Kolski debuted on the season finale of the fourth season of HBO's Def Poetry Jam then appeared again in the sixth season.

Hernandez-Kolski was chosen to warm up the crowd for Hillary Clinton's speech at the 2015 National Council of La Raza annual conference. Hernandez-Kolski currently tours around the country with his performances titled, "Refried Latino Pride" and "Cultural Collisions: Commentary for a Changing America."

In addition to his solo work, he performs regularly with his comedy partner, comedian/beatboxer Joshua Silverstein. In addition to their live performances, they co-hosted Si TV's Not So Foreign Filmmakers Showcase and shot a political/comedy digital series for MiTu, Pocho Joe & Silverstein.

Hernandez-Kolski hosts Downbeat 720, an open-mic for high school youth sponsored by the City of Santa Monica. The televised version, Downbeat Showdown received the Los Angeles Emmy for "Outstanding Youth Programming."

Hernandez-Kolski's first solo hip-hop theater show You Wanna Piece of Me? was published by the University of Michigan press in a hip-hop theater anthology, Say Word: Voices from Hip Hop Theater.

Hernandez-Kolski has a guest role in the 2016 Netflix series Gilmore Girls
