= Mayda Del Valle =

- Born: 1978 (age 47–48); Chicago, Illinois, U.S.
- Citizenship: United States
- Occupations: Poet, writer
- Writing career
- Language: English
- Genres: Slam poetry, performance poetry
- Website: maydadelvalle.com

Mayda Del Valle is an American slam poet. She is the poet laureate of Chicago.

== Biography ==
She was raised in Chicago's South Side, the daughter of Puerto Rican parents, Carmen, a homemaker, and Alejandro, a forklift operator.

Del Valle graduated from Williams College. She first performed slam poetry at New York's Nuyorican Poet's Café. She later won the 2001 Nuyorican Grand Slam Champion and the 2001 National Slam Poet individual title. She worked on Def Poetry Jam for four seasons as writer and was a cast member in Russell Simmons' Def Poetry Jam on Broadway.

She has been featured in The New York Times and Latina magazine.

Oprah Winfrey's O, The Oprah Magazine selected Del Valle as one of 20 women on the publication's first "O Power List."

In May 2009, First Lady Michelle Obama and President Barack Obama asked Del Valle to perform at the White House's Evening of Poetry, Music, and the Spoken Word.

Del Valle was also a judge on the HBO television film of the 2010 Brave New Voices slam poetry competition.
