= Joaquin Zihuatanejo =

American slam poet and teacher (born 1971)

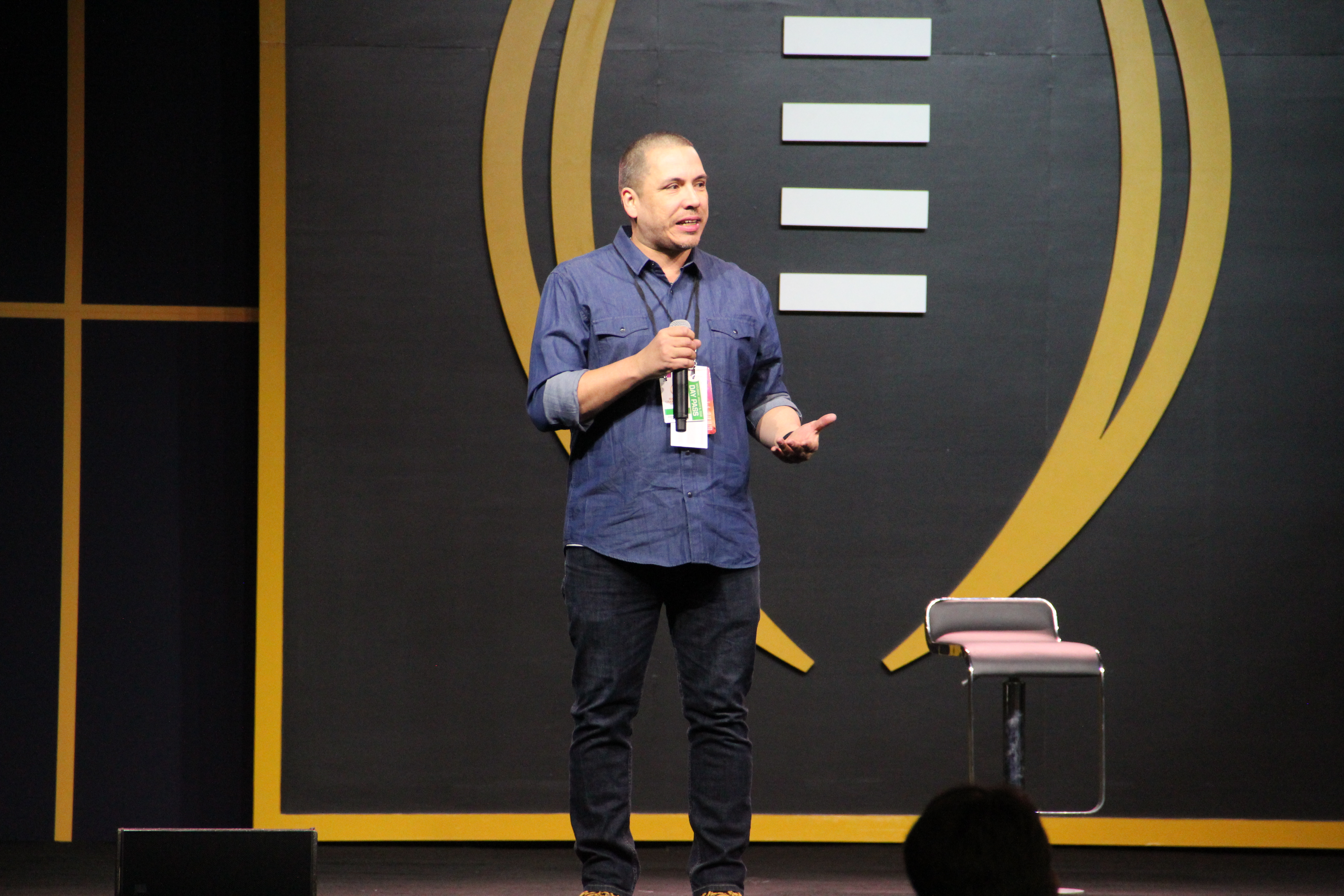
Zihuatanejo in 2018

Joaquin Zihuatanejo (born 1971 in Dallas, Texas) is an American slam poet and teacher. In 2004, Zihuatanejo competed in the National Poetry Slam as part of the Dallas Poetry Slam team, which placed third. He also appeared on HBO's Def Poetry in 2005. In 2008, he won the Individual World Poetry Slam and was the winner of the World Cup of Poetry Slam in 2009. He is a featured faculty member at the 2018 Conference on Poetry and Teaching at The Frost Place in Franconia, NH. Currently, Zihuatanejo resides near his hometown of Dallas with his wife and two daughters. Outside of poetry, Zihuatanejo taught English and creative writing for seven years.

Zihuatanejo regularly visits Middle and High Schools like New Tech High and Coppell High School. One teacher, Danae Boyd says "Zihuatanejo is an inspiration to all of our students. He encourages them and shows them the true beauty of poetry."

On April 6, 2022, Zihuatanejo was named the first Poet Laureate of the City of Dallas.

== Life ==
Zihuatanejo was born in Dallas, Texas.

== Works ==
=== Poetry collections ===
- Of Fire and Rain (BookBaby, 2007)
- Barrio Songs (2011)
- Family Tree (2012)
- Fight or Flight (CoolSpeak Publishing Company, 2015)
- Arsonist (2018)
- Occupy Whiteness (Deep Vellum Publishing, 2024)
