= Ise Lyfe =

American spoken word artist and activist

Ise Lyfe (pronounced "Ice Life")
- Born: Isaac Patrick-Francis Brown; December 28, 1982 (age 42); Oakland, California
- Occupation(s): Entrepreneur, Actor, Social Justice Advocate, Spoken Word Artist, Writer, Emcee
- Years active: 2000–present
- Organization: Lyfe Productives
- Notable work: Pistols and Prayers (2010), Pistols and Prayers Audiobook (2010), Brighter Than Blight (2013)
- Awards: John George Social Justice Award (2009); Civic Pride Award (2011); Oakland Indie Award (2012); Oakland Soul Award (2012); Ise Lyfe Day birthday honored by City of Oakland (2012)
- Website: www.iselyfe.com

Ise Lyfe (pronounced "Ice Life"), born Isaac Patrick-Francis Brown, is a spoken word and hip-hop artist as well as an educator, community organizer, and activist in his native Oakland, California. He appeared on Russell Simmons' Def Poetry Jam performing a piece entitled Popular Dirt on HBO. He appeared in a one-man show based on his book Pistols and Prayers, and wrote another one-person show called Who's Krazy?. He has also presented a multi-media conceptual art project, Brighter than Blight.

From 2008 to 2011 he was a member of the Cultural Affairs Commission for the city of Oakland. He won the Soul of Oakland award in 2012. He was featured along with several other Oakland artists in the book Oakland in Popular Memory by Matt Werner.

== Early life ==
=== Childhood and Family Life ===
Ise Lyfe was born to Sharon and Francis Brown on December 28, 1982. He has two younger siblings named Erin and Constance Brown. His parents separated in 1990. Lyfe and his sisters were raised by their mother in East Oakland's so-called "Brookfield Village", a low to lower middle income working class community near the city's southern border. He attended Fruitvale Elementary School where he would first be introduced to poetry through the works of Langston Hughes, He competed in and won citywide oratorical festivals performing the works of writers from the Harlem Renaissance in the 5th and 6th grade. He attended Montera Junior High School (Now Montera Middle School) in the Oakland Hills/Montclair area where he was bussed to a higher economic school. He began rapping in junior high school.

=== Turning Point (2002 Concert Murder) ===
Ise Lyfe attended Skyline High School (Oakland, California) from 1997–2001, graduating in 2001. He performed average academically and faced common challenges experienced by young Black men growing up in American inner-cities. In a 2006 documentary on his early life and young adulthood directed by Erica Eng, Lyfe recounts a turning point in his life where he witnessed a riot at a rap concert at the age of 17 when someone violently lost their life. He said he realized that he and many others had grown numb to violence and this startled him towards a more deliberate path of being constructive. His performing and writing as a teen poet commenced shortly after.

=== Visionary Artist, Community Organizer and Activist ===
Ise Lyfe became popular on the Bay Area Spoken Word and Hip-Hop scene in the early 2000s. A local favorite, he won regional and national poetry slam competitions, and club shows with him on the bill became sold-out events. Lyfe also became a young voice for social justice and community organizing. He co-founded a social justice arts/activism collective, P.O.W.E.R., and was also affiliated with Youth Together, Youth Speaks, Leadership Excellence, and other organizations addressing social inequity.

He worked as a regional marketer for Def Jam West promoting artists and special events and was inspired to form his company Lyfe Productives at the age of 23 years, a Product Development firm specializing in developing products and campaigns with healthy and transformative outcomes.
