= X Infinity =

Studio album by Watsky
- Released: August 19, 2016
- Recorded: 2014–2016
- Studios: Seahorse Studios, Los Angeles, California; Grand St. Recording, Brooklyn, New York; Aqua Vibea, Hadley, Massachusetts
- Genre: Alternative hip-hop
- Length: 65:42 (standard version); 75:22 (deluxe version)
- Labels: Steel Wool Media, Empire
- Producers: Watsky; Kush Mody; Russell Simmons; Anderson Paak; Frans Mernick; Mikos Da Gawd; Daniel Riera; Wax; Andrew Oedel

Watsky chronology
All You Can Do (2014)	X Infinity (2016)	Complaint (2018)

Singles from x Infinity
- 1. "Stick to Your Guns" Released: July 1, 2016; 2. "Tiny Glowing Screens, Pt. 3" Released: July 8, 2016; 3. "Talking to Myself" Released: July 26, 2016; 4. "Midnight Heart" Released: August 9, 2016

x Infinity, (pronounced Times Infinity) is the fourth studio album by American rapper, spoken word artist and author George Watsky, released on August 19, 2016. The album was recorded at Seahorse Studios in Los Angeles, Grand St. Recording in Brooklyn, and Aqua Vibea in Hadley, Massachusetts.

The album, executive produced by Russell Simmons – who Watsky previously connected with as a guest on Season 6 of Simmons' HBO series Russell Simmons Presents Def Poetry – was produced by Kush Mody and features additional production from Anderson .Paak and drumming by Josh Dun of Twenty One Pilots, among other collaborations. Unlike Watsky's previous album, All You Can Do, which was almost entirely produced by .Paak, the album contains only one song, Midnight Heart, that features production from him. Josh Dun of Twenty One Pilots accompanies Watsky on the drums in Track 13, Midnight Heart. In 2026, to commemorate x Infinity’s 10 year anniversary, Watsky released a special 10 year anniversary edition with a new single called Exquisite Corpse X. He went on tour shortly after to celebrate the occasion, show off the album film made for it 10 years prior, and help transition his career into film for the audience.

== Background ==
On Twitter, Watsky described the album's thesis statement as a message "that embracing our insignificance in the vastness of time & space frees us to be joyful." He stated in another tweet that the album was his first in 2 years.

== Release ==
The lead single, Stick to Your Guns featuring Julia Nunes, was released on July 1, 2016, as a free download on Watsky's Bandcamp page. A week later, the second single, Tiny Glowing Screens, Pt. 3, was released alongside the announcement of the album. An accompanying music video was released on YouTube. On August 18, 2016, the day before the album's scheduled release, lyric annotation site Genius premiered the song Don't Be Nice, along with the lyrics for the entire album. This is not the first time Watsky premiered music right before the album through Genius; a similar promotion was done for the release of Cardboard Castles and All You Can Do.

== Reception ==
Professional ratings
Review scores
Source	Rating
AllMusic	3.5/5 stars
The Musical Hype	4/5 stars

x Infinity was met with positive reviews.

Andy Kellman of AllMusic gave the album a three and a half out of five stars, adding that "Ultimately, this is his brightest, most accomplished release yet."

== Track listing ==
Track listing and credits from Genius.

No.	Title	Writer(s)	Producer(s)	Length
1.	"Tiny Glowing Screens, Pt. 3" (featuring Danny McClain & Camila Recchio)	Watsky; Kush Mody	Mody	3:53
2.	"Talking to Myself"	Watsky; Julian Le	Watsky; Mody	3:41
3.	"Chemical Angel"	Watsky; Le	Mody	2:31
4.	"Little Slice" (featuring Danny McClain)	Watsky; Frans Mernick	Mernick; Mody	3:24
5.	"Springtime in New York"	Watsky; Mernick	Mernick	2:23
6.	"Pink Lemonade"	Watsky; Daniel Riera	Riera	3:17
7.	"Don't Be Nice"	Watsky; Mody	Mody	3:18
8.	"Yes Britannia"		Mody; Watsky	3:37
9.	"Love Letters"	Watsky; Mody	Mody	4:24
10.	"Stick to Your Guns" (featuring Julia Nunes)	Watsky; Mody	Mody	4:05
11.	"Brave New World" (featuring Chaos Chaos)	Watsky; Mody	Mody	4:04
12.	"Going Down"	Watsky; Mikos	Mikos	5:16
13.	"Midnight Heart" (featuring Mal Devisa)	Watsky; Brandon Paak Anderson; Michael Jones	Paak; Mody	4:37
14.	"Lovely Thing Suite: Conversations"	Watsky; Mody	Mody	3:40
15.	"Lovely Thing Suite: Knots"	Watsky; Mody; Ryan Whyman	Mody	3:06
16.	"Lovely Thing Suite: Roses"	Watsky; Mody	Mody; Mikos	4:09
17.	"Lovely Thing Suite: Theories"	Watsky; Mody	Mody	6:17
Total length:				65:42

Bonus track
No.	Title	Writer(s)	Producer(s)	Length
18.	"Exquisite Corpse" (featuring Dumbfoundead, Grieves, Adam Vida, Wax, Rafael Casal, Daveed Diggs, and Chinaka Hodge)	Watsky; Mody; Jonathan Park; Benjamin Laub; Adam Traore; Jones; Rafael Casal; Daveed Diggs; Chinaka Hodge	Mody	9:40
Total length:				75:22

== Charts ==
Chart (2016)	Peak position
New Zealand Heatseekers Albums (RMNZ)	6
US Billboard 200	58
