= Big Poppa E =

American performer of slam poetry

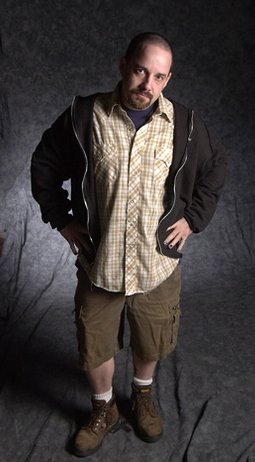
- Occupations: Slam poet, writer
- Known for: The Wussy Boy Manifesto
- Website: http://www.bigpoppae.com

Big Poppa E is an American performer of slam poetry. His live performances combined poetry, stand-up comedy, and dramatic monologue.

== Performance poetry ==
He participated in the 10th Annual Poetry Slam in Chicago as part of the San Francisco team. In that event, he identifies himself as a "Wussy Boy" in introductions of his performance poem The Wussy Boy Manifesto, a humorous rant which champions sensitive men and elevates Duckie from Pretty in Pink and Lloyd Dobler from Say Anything... to role models. Ms. Magazine named him "an icon for effeminate males" and the Los Angeles Times called him the "leader of a new men's movement." Jacinda Abcarian says his work gives a male's perspective on male bashing.

In 2001, he released a 2-disc recording of his work, including the "Wussy Boy Videos" . The Chicago News and Review said the work was "colorful, scathing tirades" with "rapid timing and delivery (namely volume) for maximum impact".

== Apple Computer ==
Big Poppa E's video "Why I Got Fired From Apple" received over a million hits on YouTube, Google Video, and MySpace. The clip detailed the uproar over the poem Oh! Canadian FedEx Lady! after it was performed at an Apple Computer employee talent show in 2005, two days after which Big Poppa was fired for undisclosed reasons.

The poem was a comedic rant about a male worker in the Apple Computer call center who flirts over the phone with a female Canadian FedEx employee while keeping "rude, mean American customers" on hold.

The story of his firing was picked up in various news sources across the Internet and was used as an example of increased scrutiny of employee blogging and vlogging by companies that has led to firings.
