= Mike Abrams (criminal) =

American criminal in Chinatown, New York City

- Died: 1898; New York, New York, U.S.
- Other name: Big Mike
- Occupations: New York criminal and longtime underworld figure
- Known for: He was a criminal for hire on the streets of New York's Chinatown.

Mike Abrams (died 1898) also known as Big Mike was an American criminal and a longtime figure in the underworld of New York's Chinatown.

== Criminal career ==
A criminal for hire on the streets of New York's Chinatown, Mike Abrams was one of many employed by the Tongs and others for assault and murder for hire among other criminal activities. He also operated opium dens on Pell Street as well as on Coney Island and, during his later years, took in protection money from similar establishments.

However, despite his business activities, he had a violent and dangerous reputation among the residents of Chinatown particularly the decapitations of three men in front of dozens of witnesses on Pell Street.

== Altercations ==
Although feared by many Tong hatchetmen, Abrams was attacked by a drunken Hip Sing hatchetman Sassy Sam who chased the unarmed Abrams with a ceremonial sword down Pell Street. Despite the murder and decapitation of Hip Sing chief Ling Tchen, Abrams lost a considerable amount of respect from the Tongs after the embarrassing incident and soon began plotting against him.

== Death ==
Less than a month after Ling Tchen's murder, police found the body of Abrams whose room had been filled with gas while he was asleep. A further investigation found the door and windows of his room had been blocked off and a thin hose from a gas jet in the hall had been stuffed into the keyhole.

Although credited in the underworld for Abram's murder, the Hip Sing Association never claimed responsibility (possibly fearing retribution from Abrams associates elsewhere in New York).

== See also ==
- Hui
- Tong Wars
- Tiandihui
- List of Chinese criminal organizations
