= Staceyann Chin =

American poet (born 1972)

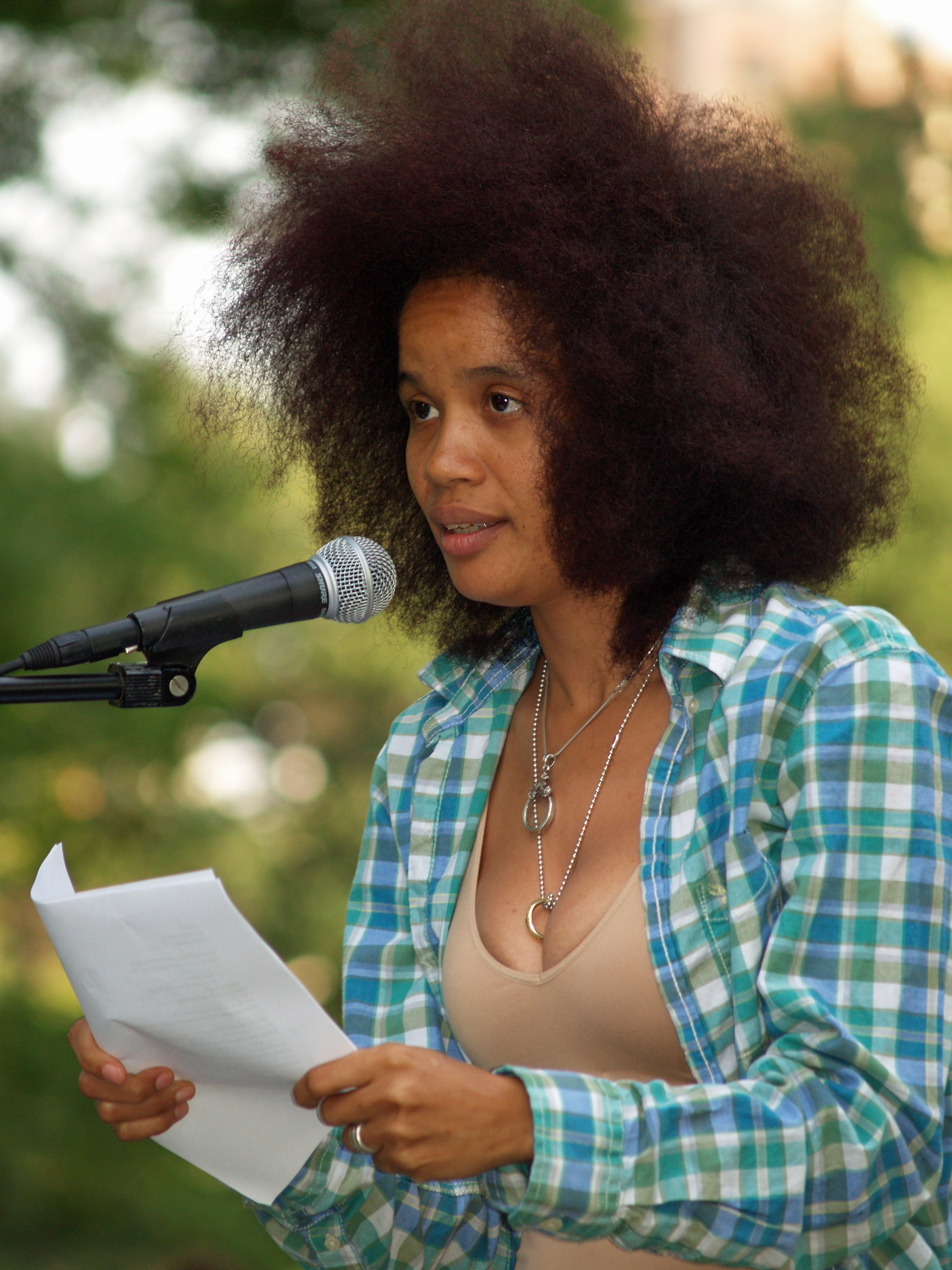
- Born: December 25, 1972 (age 53); St. James, Jamaica
- Occupations: Poet, writer, performance artist

Staceyann Chin (born December 25, 1972) is a spoken-word poet, performing artist and LGBTQ rights political activist. Her work has been published in The New York Times, The Washington Post, and the Pittsburgh Daily, and has been featured on 60 Minutes. She was also featured on The Oprah Winfrey Show, where she shared her struggles growing up as a gay person in Jamaica. Chin's first full-length poetry collection was published in 2019.

== Personal life ==
Chin was born in Jamaica but now lives in New York City, in Brooklyn. She is of Chinese-Jamaican and Afro-Jamaican descent. She announced in 2011 that she was pregnant with her first child, giving birth to her daughter in 2012. She has been candid about her pregnancy by means of in-vitro fertilization, and wrote about her experiences as a pregnant, single lesbian in a guest blog for the HuffPost.

== Career ==
Openly lesbian, she has been an "out poet and political activist" since 1998. In addition to performing in and co-writing the Tony-nominated Russell Simmons' Def Poetry Jam on Broadway, Chin has appeared in Off-Broadway one-woman shows and at the Nuyorican Poets Cafe. She has also held poetry workshops worldwide. Chin credits her accomplishments to her hard-working grandmother and the pain of her mother's absence.

Chin's poetry can be found in her first chapbook, Wildcat Woman, the one she now carries on her back, Stories Surrounding My Coming, and numerous anthologies, including Skyscrapers, Taxis and Tampons, Poetry Slam, Role Call, Cultural Studies: Critical Methodologies. Chin's voice can be heard on CD compilations out of Bar 13- Union Square and Pow Wow productions. In 2009, Chin published her autobiographical novel, The Other Side of Paradise: A Memoir.

She has been a host on Logo's After Ellen Internet show, "She Said What?" and a co-host of Centric's My Two Cents.

In 2009, Chin performed in The People Speak, a documentary feature film that uses dramatic and musical performances of the letters, diaries, and speeches of everyday Americans, based on historian Howard Zinn's A People's History of the United States.

She taught a seminar at the arts-oriented Saint Ann's School in Brooklyn.

In 2024 she was the subject of Laurie Townshend's documentary film A Mother Apart.

== Critical analysis ==
Chin's "activist driven" work has garnered praise in various publications. Of her one-woman show Border/Clash, The New York Times wrote that Chin "is sassy, rageful and sometimes softly self-mocking." The Advocate wrote, "With poems that combine hilarious one-liners ("I told her I liked the way she made that pink push-up bra look intellectual") with a refusal to conform ("I want to be the dyke who likes to fuck men"), Chin is out to confront more than just the straight world." In the book, Words in Your Face: A Guided Tour Through Twenty Years of the New York City Poetry Slam, author Cristin O'Keefe Aptowicz referred to Chin as "definitely the prize to win" among the three New York City Poetry Slam venues during the years she competed, adding:

To watch Chin perform is to watch the very essence of poetry manifested: her performances are imperfect, volatile and beautiful. Chin's poetry is passionate and well-written, sure; but it's her ability to communicate that passion in performance that is unparalleled. She becomes the poetry.

== Awards ==
Chin was the winner of the 1999 Chicago People of Color Slam; first runner- up in the 1999 Outright Poetry Slam; winner of the 1998 Lambda Poetry Slam; a finalist in the 1999 Nuyorican Grand Slam; winner of the 1998 and 2000 Slam This!; and winner of WORD: The First Slam for Television. She has also been featured by public-access television cable television programs in Brooklyn and Manhattan as well as many local radio stations including, WHCR and WBAI. The Joseph Papp Public Theater has featured her on more than one occasion, and Staceyann has toured internationally, with performances in London, Denmark, Germany, South Africa and New York's own Central Park Summer Stage. In 2015, she was named by Equality Forum as one of their 31 Icons of the 2015 LGBTQ History Month.

=== Other Awards ===
- Drama Desk Award (2003)
- Center for Women and Gender at Dartmouth College for the Visionary-in-Residence Award (2007)
- Human Rights Campaign Power of the Voice Award (2007)
- Lesbian AIDS Project Honors (2008)
- Safe Haven Award from Immigration Equality (2008)
- New York State Senate Special Human Rights Award (2009)
- LGBTQ Humanist Award (2017)
- American Book Awards (2020)

== Works ==
=== Books ===
- The Other Side of Paradise - A Memoir. 2010. New York: Scribner. ISBN 0743292901
- Crossfire: A Litany for Survival. 2019. Chicago: Haymarket Books. ISBN 9781642590258

=== Chapbooks ===
- Wildcat Woman (1998)
- Stories Surrounding My Coming (2001)
- Catalogue the Insanity (2005)
- Mad Hatter: Ramblings from the Attic Volume 1 (2007)
- Mad Hatter: Ramblings from the Attic Volume 2 (2007)

=== Theatre ===
- Hands Afire (2000) (one-woman show) - Bleecker Theatre, New York
- Unspeakable Things (2001) (one-woman show) - Bleecker Theatre, New York
- Russell Simmons' Def Poetry Jam on Broadway (2002–2003)
- Border/Clash: A Litany of Desires (2005) (one-woman show) - Bleecker Theatre, New York
- Motherstruck! (one-woman show) (2015–2016) (Run in Chicago, DC, and NYC)

=== Anthologies ===
- "Authenticity", in Black Cool: One Thousand Streams of Blackness. Edited by Rebecca Walker (Soft Skull Press, February 1, 2012)

=== Performances ===
- Staceyann Chin: Performed Poems in Trikster - Nordic Queer Journal #3, 2009.
