= Michael Clemente =

American mobster

- Born: August 29, 1908; New York City, U.S.
- Died: December 1987 (aged 79)
- Other names: Mike Costello; Big Mike
- Occupations: Labor organizer, business agent (International Longshoremen's Association)
- Known for: Controlling the East River waterfront of Manhattan
- Status: Convicted
- Allegiance: Genovese crime family
- Criminal charges: Extortion, conspiracy to violate federal liquor laws, perjury, Racketeer Influenced and Corrupt Organizations Act (RICO) violations, tax evasion
- Penalty: 5 years (1953); 20 years (1979)

Michael Clemente (August 29, 1908 – December 1987), (also known as Mike Costello or Big Mike), was a New York mobster in the Genovese crime family who became a major force in controlling the East River waterfront of Manhattan from the 1940s to 1979. His principal territory was between piers 36 and 42. In 1943, Clemente, who was a Caporegime of Joseph Lanza, took over his boss's waterfront rackets at the Fulton Fish Market on the East River when "Socks" Lanza went to prison for 7½ years for extortion.

== Biography ==
Born in New York City, Clemente lived in Brooklyn. He married Josephine Tresonte and was the father of three daughters. His official jobs included labor organizer, secretary, and business agent for Manhattan Local 856 of the International Longshoremen's Association (ILA). Clemente's criminal record included rape, assault, disorderly conduct, extortion, conspiracy to violate federal liquor laws, and perjury.

Originally a lieutenant in a crew of Rocco Pellegrino, Clemente used his power at the waterfront to extort money from shipping companies and the companies that loaded and unloaded cargo. At one point, the president of a company managing stevedores paid Clemente $11,000 for one of his daughter's weddings. In 1953, Clemente was convicted of extortion, removed from office at the ILA local, and sent to prison for five years. After his release, he exercised control at the ILA through his surrogates.

In 1977, the government gained the cooperation of William Montella, a shipping company employee, and planted undercover surveillance devices in his office. Over the next two years, law enforcement recorded meetings there in which Clemente received payments from Montella. In 1979, Clemente was convicted on Racketeer Influenced and Corrupt Organizations Act (RICO) charges including extortion and tax evasion and was sentenced to 20 years in federal prison.

On February 21, 1987, Clemente was released from prison. Clemente died in December 1987.

== In popular culture ==
Clemente was reportedly the inspiration for the character of waterfront boss "Johnny Friendly", played by Lee J. Cobb, in the 1954 film On the Waterfront.
