= Bruce George (Genius Is Common) =

- Born: New York, U.S.
- Education: Niagara University
- Occupations: Co-Founder of Russell Simmons Presents, Def Poetry Jam (HBO), Founder of the Genius Is Common Movement.
- Website: Genius Is Common

Bruce George is the co-founder of the award-winning "Russell Simmons Presents, Def Poetry Jam (HBO)," and the Founder of a growing "Genius Is Common" Movement. He is also an executive producer, writer, poet, entrepreneur, author, speaker and social activist. He was born and raised in New York City. He has written poetry/prose & articles for over 36 years.

== Genius Is Common ==
The slogan used Genius is Common suggests that all beings have an extraordinary or exceptional creative power in them. The idea implying that for example a woman that comes from a city, who knows how to micro braid hair, as Picasso painted in (for example) 'Woman with braid (1971)'; that skill is her genius. The movement has been gaining some attention due to its optimistic ideals, its key concept being that every being has their own unique way of expressing their passion, in their profession, their art or their talents.

== Poetic stance ==
"It’s imperative that these spoken word artists be catapulted to the mainstream and be recognized. Finally the marriage between hip-hop and spoken word can begin the arduous task of reconciliation." —Bruce George

== Awards ==
- "The President's Lifetime Achievement Award 2024"
- "Peabody Award" for "Russell Simmons Presents, Def Poetry Jam(HBO)"
- "Tony Award" for "Russell Simmons Def Poetry Jam on Broadway "
- "Miky Award" for "Russell Simmons Presents, Def Poetry Jam (HBO)"

== Education ==
George graduated from Niagara University with a B.A. degree in psychology.

== Bibliography ==
Bruce George is the Founder/Managing Editor of:

- "The Bandana Republic, an Anthology of Poetry & Prose by Gang Members & Their Affiliates." (2008)
