= Rives (poet) =

American poet, storyteller, and author (born 1968)

- Born: October 31, 1968 (age 57); Los Angeles, California, U.S.
- Occupation: Poet
- Website: shopliftwindchimes.com

Rives (born 1968) is an American poet, storyteller, and author. He appeared on seasons 3-6 of HBO's Def Poetry Jam and was a member of Team Hollywood, which won the 2004 National Poetry Slam. His best-known poems include "Kite," about waking up alone in a new lover's apartment, and "Mockingbird," which he performs differently every time, incorporating the words of other poets and speakers in the program.

In 2008, Rives hosted the television special Ironic Iconic America with Tommy Hilfiger and Bar Refaeli, examining how pop culture has influenced American tastes and styles. In October of that year, he began appearing as the "first 2.0 poet" in a series of ads for telecom company Orange S.A.

Rives has made multiple appearances at the TED Conference and is the regular co-host of TEDYouth. His multimedia performances touch on themes of connectedness, wordplay, and romance. In 2013, Rives began curating the Museum of Four in the Morning, an online crowd-sourced collection of references to the time, 04:00 am, in art and popular culture.

Rives has written and paper engineered several pop-up books for children and adults. Early in his career, Rives worked at Intervisual Books, under the leadership of Waldo Hunt. Two pop-up books, with paper engineering by Rives, were finalists for the Movable Book Society Meggendorfer Prize for Best Paper Engineering: The Consummate Cigar Book in 2000 and If I Were a Polar Bear in 2002.

== The Museum of Four in the Morning ==
Rives created The Museum of Four in the Morning, a collection of 4:00 a.m. references in art, culture, and elsewhere. The collection started after he gave a talk at TED2007. The talk, The 4 a.m. mystery, was a mock "conspiracy theory" about 4:00 a.m. and a series of coincidences he had encountered. Rives theorized that Swiss sculptor and painter, Alberto Giacometti (his sculpture, The Palace at 4 a.m.) was the beginning of what he called “The Giacometti Code”. Rives made connections to many 04:00 am references and events including Isabel Allende (her novel, The House of the Spirits), Bill Clinton (his autobiography, My Life), Wislawa Szymborska (her poem, Four in the Morning), and Dame Judi Dench (her film, Four in the Morning). After the talk, Rives received 04:00 am references from people who had seen the talk live. Soon however, he would receive many more messages after his talk was published on the TED website, which had launched in April that year. While he never intended for the project to go beyond the 2007 talk, he realized at a certain point that he had this hobby thanks to all the submissions he had received.

Rives was curious about a possible confirmation bias for the time, questioning whether one couldn’t effectively do the same for any hour of the day. He found that four in the morning was the one that came up in dire or interesting contexts and was often used as a scapegoat hour. Thanks to all the messages and tips he received, Rives published the collection online in October, 2013. On the site, a refresh button brings up randomized video clips, with links to Tumblr, Instagram, and Twitter pages that are regularly updated with other 4:00 a.m. references.

== TED talks ==
- "If I controlled the Internet"
- "A mockingbird remix of TED2006"
- "The 4 a.m. mystery"
- "A story of mixed emoticons"
- "Reinventing the encyclopedia game"
- "The Museum of Four in the Morning"
