= Chinaka Hodge =

American poet, educator, playwright, and screenwriter

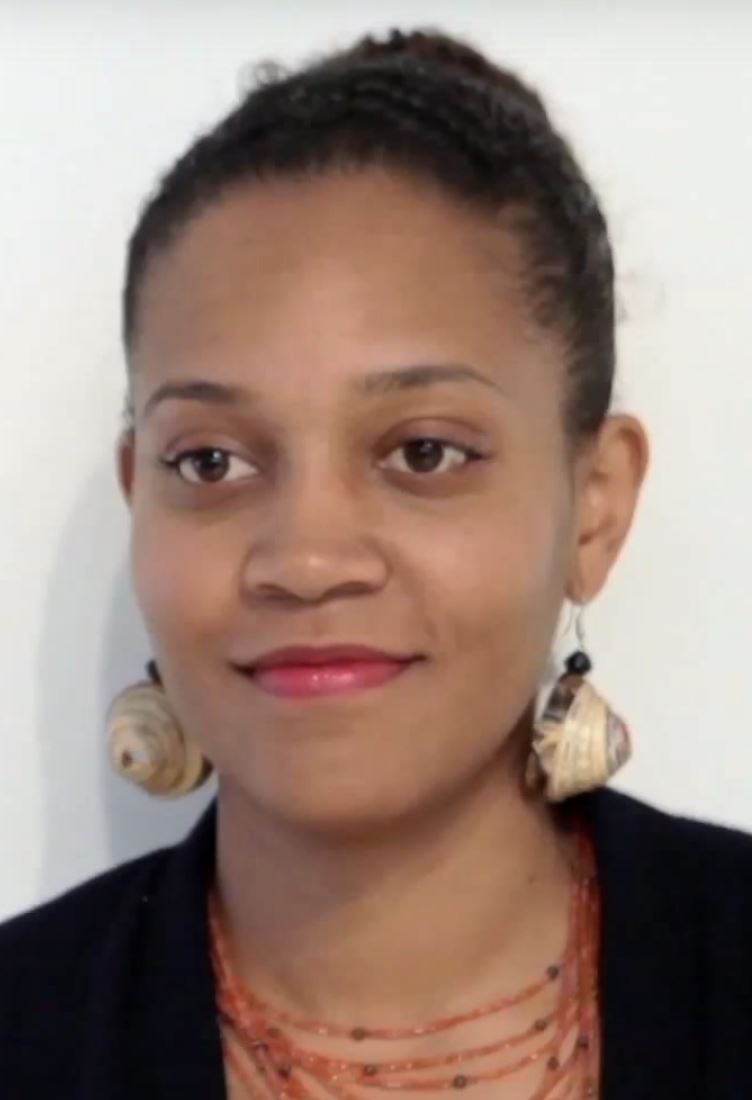
- Hodge in 2014
- Born: 1984 or 1985 (age 41–42); Oakland, California, U.S.
- Education: New York University; University of Southern California (MFA)
- Occupations: Poet; educator; playwright; screenwriter
- Partner: McLeod Bethel Thompson

Chinaka Hodge (born 1984) is an American poet, educator, playwright and screenwriter. She has received national recognition for her publications, especially her artistic work on gentrification.

== Early life ==
Chinaka Hodge was born in Oakland, California, the daughter of Afrocentric, Bay Area community activist Greg "Baba" Hodge. She lived in various neighborhoods of the city throughout the course of her childhood, and graduated from Berkeley High School. During her time at Berkeley High, journalist Meredith Maran profiled the school and some of its students, and in the resulting book Class Dismissed: A Year in the Life of an American High School, a Glimpse into the Heart of a Nation, Maran quoted from pieces of Hodge's poetry.

External videos
- Presentation on Class Dismissed, including poetry readings by Hodge and her classmates, November 29, 2000, C-SPAN

In May 2006, Hodge graduated from NYU's Gallatin School of Individualized Study, and was the student speaker at the 174th Commencement exercise. Four years later, Chinaka received USC's Annenberg Fellowship to continue her studies at its School of Cinematic Arts. She received her MFA in Writing for Film and TV in 2012.

== Career ==
Hodge was a 2012 Artist in Residence at The Headlands Center for the Arts in Marin, CA. In January 2013, Hodge was a Sundance Feature Film lab Fellow for her script, "700th&Int'l." In June 2013 she began as a first-year fellow at Cave Canem’s summer retreat.

Since 2005, Hodge has worked in various capacities at Youth Speaks/The Living Word Project, a San Francisco-based literary arts non-profit. During her tenure there, she served as Program Director, Associate Artistic Director, and worked directly with Youth Speaks’ core population as a teaching artist and poet mentor.

She has acted in comparable capacities in New York and Los Angeles at Urban Word NYC and Get Lit: Words Ignite. Her poems, editorials, interviews and prose have been featured in Newsweek, San Francisco Magazine, Believer Magazine, PBS, NPR, CNN, C-SPAN, and in two seasons of HBO’s Def Poetry. In 2013 and 2014, she was featured in two of Watsky's music videos as a guest rapper and writer. She is also the author of the book Dated Emcees (City Lights, 2016), a collection of poetry about urban hip-hop.

In April 2021, Hodge had been hired as the head writer on the Marvel Studios streaming series Ironheart for Disney+. In 2025 she was nominated at the 57th NAACP Image Awards for Outstanding Breakthrough Creative in Television for her writing work on the series.

=== Music ===
Hodge is a founding member, along with Daveed Diggs and Rafael Casal, of a collaborative hip hop ensemble, The Getback.

=== Plays ===
- Mirrors In Every Corner (2010)
- Chasing Mehserle (2014)

=== Poetry collections ===
- For Girls with Hips: Collected Poems and Writings (2006)
- Dated Emcees (2016)

== Personal life ==
Hodge is in a long-term relationship with McLeod Bethel-Thompson, a gridiron football quarterback who plays in the Canadian Football League for the Ottawa REDBLACKS.

== Filmography ==
Year	Title	Credited as		Notes
Year	Title	Writer	Actor	Notes
2004	Def Poetry	No	Yes	
2011	Miles Away	Yes	No	
2012	The Dream Share Project	No	Yes	Johnson State College documentary
2013	Kill a Hipster	Yes	Yes	Song by Watsky, guest rapper and writer
2014	Exquisite Corpse	Yes	Yes	Song by Watsky, guest rapper and writer
2020	Amazing Stories	Yes	No	Wrote: "The Heat", also executive story editor
2020	Snowpiercer	Yes	No	Teleplay: "Justice Never Boarded", also staff writer
2022	The Midnight Club	Yes	No	Co-wrote: "Witch", also co-producer
2025	Ironheart	Yes	No	Head writer, wrote "Take Me Home" and "The Past Is the Past"
