= George Watsky =

American rapper, singer and poet

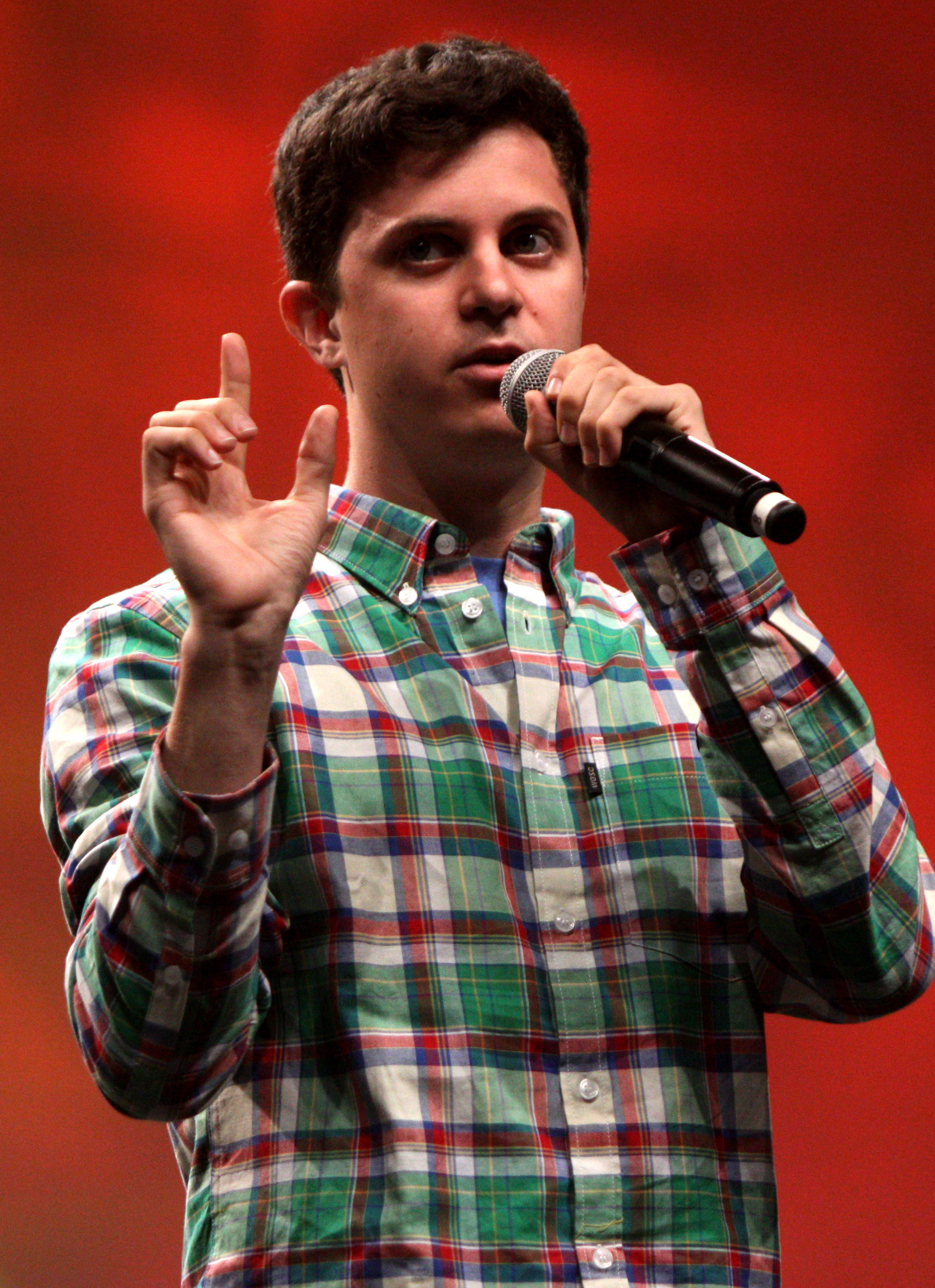
- Watsky in June 2012

Background information
- Born: George Virden Watsky; September 15, 1986 (age 40); San Francisco, California, U.S.
- Genres: Alternative hip-hop; slam poetry; spoken word; essay; progressive rap
- Occupations: Rapper; singer; songwriter; record producer; poet; author; illustrator
- Years active: 2001–present
- Label: Steel Wool Media / EMPIRE
- Website: georgewatsky.com

George Virden Watsky (born September 15, 1986) is an American rapper, singer, songwriter, record producer, poet, author, and illustrator.

Watsky broke out as a rapper with his viral video "Watsky raps fast" in 2011, which featured his trademark chopping style. He has released seven studio albums: Watsky (2009), Cardboard Castles (2013), All You Can Do (2014), x Infinity (2016), Complaint (2019), Placement (2020), and Intention (2023). He performs live shows with a backing band called Créme Fraîche. He is also known for his appearances in episodes of Epic Rap Battles of History, and as an author following the publication of How to Ruin Everything in 2016.

On May 7, 2020, Watsky set the Guinness World Record for longest rapping marathon, rapping for 33 hours 33 minutes and 19 seconds. Also known for his slam poetry, he was featured on Season 6 of Russell Simmons Presents Def Poetry.

== Early life ==
George Virden Watsky was born in San Francisco, California, on September 15, 1986, the son of librarian Clare E. (née Miller) and psychotherapist Paul Norman Watsky. His maternal grandfather was Democratic politician Clement Woodnutt Miller. He has a brother who is a pilot and has described himself as "half Jewish" on his father's side. Watsky attended San Francisco University High School and Emerson College in Boston. He majored in Writing and Acting for the Screen and Stage, a program he designed through the Interdisciplinary Studies Program at Emerson. His talents began to receive national and international acclaim in 2006 when he was the Youth Speaks Grand Slam Poetry Champion, and was also named Brave New Voices International Poetry Slam Champion.

== Career ==
=== Poetry ===
Watsky started slam poetry at the age of 15. As a teen, he won around a dozen slams in the Bay Area, and was on the team that took fourth place in the national contest in 2005.

Watsky's poetry incorporates political and social themes. In 2006, in the midst of a lively performance to a sold-out crowd, Watsky likened politicians' behavior to a common bar pick-up line, and won the night's top score. He also appeared in Season Six, Episode Two of Def Poetry Jam that year, performing his poem "V for Virgin."

Reviewing a 2008 performance at Brandeis University, Sarah Bayer wrote, "Skinny, quirky George Watsky was next, with the night's most innovative piece. Watsky, a sophomore at Emerson College and a member of the grand prize-winning team from San Francisco at the National Youth Poetry Slam in 2006, adjusted the microphone to different parts of his body, imitated the sound of rewinding tape and recited binary code (a trope that caught the eye of headliner Saul Williams) in an altogether amusing performance." In 2009, he was also profiled in The Boston Globe; the Arts section reviewed his one-man show "Where the Magic Happens" favorably, and called him a "poetry-slam star."

Watsky continues to implement spoken word into his current career as a musician with songs like "Tiny Glowing Screens Pt. 1-3", "Cannonball.", “Springtime in New York” and “Dreams & Boxes”.

=== Music ===
==== 2009–2011: Watsky, Guilty Pleasures, and "Pale Kid Raps Fast" ====
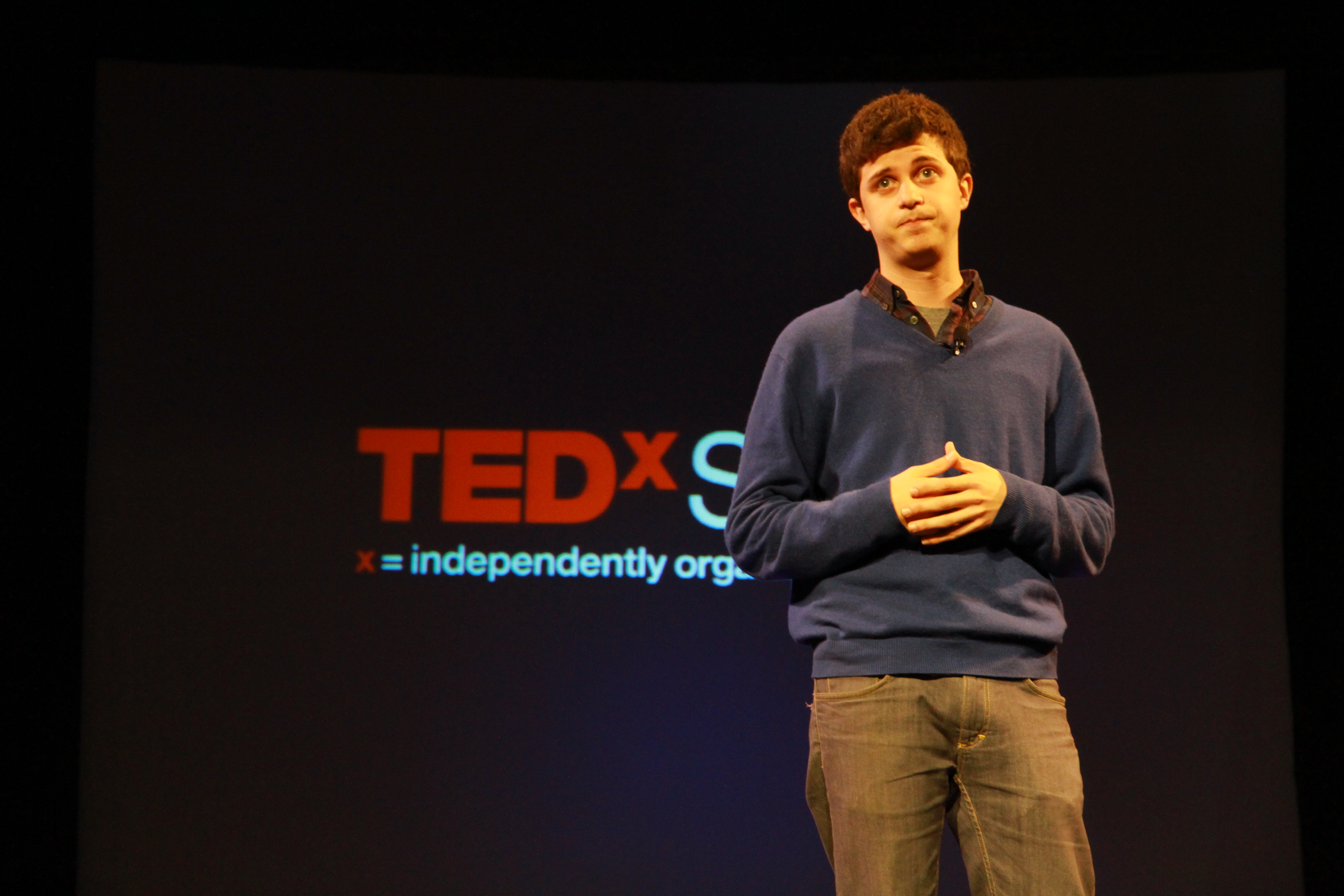
Watsky at TEDxSFED in 2011

In 2009, Watsky produced a 15-track hip-hop album titled Watsky. The next year, he released the album Guilty Pleasures, which he made available as a free download on his website. Produced by Procrastination (San Francisco musician Tobias Butler), Guilty Pleasures contains mashups between popular songs and those from his first album.

On January 17, 2011, Watsky uploaded a video entitled "Pale kid raps fast" to YouTube, in which he performed a humorous original rap with rapid delivery over the instrumental of "Break Ya Neck" by Busta Rhymes. The video went viral, partly due to support from Reddit and Philip DeFranco (Watsky's music can be heard in the background of DeFranco's news series and SourceFed channel). It accumulated four million views within two days, and eventually exceeded 25 million views despite later being unlisted by Watsky and the title being changed to "Watsky raps fast." He performed a slightly modified version of the rap on The Ellen DeGeneres Show one week later. Being able to match the speed of the song's rapping was viewed as an Internet challenge, spawning covers by fellow rappers such as Mac Lethal, and YouTube celebrities such as Hank Green and Bry.

==== 2012–2013: Nothing Like The First Time and Cardboard Castles ====
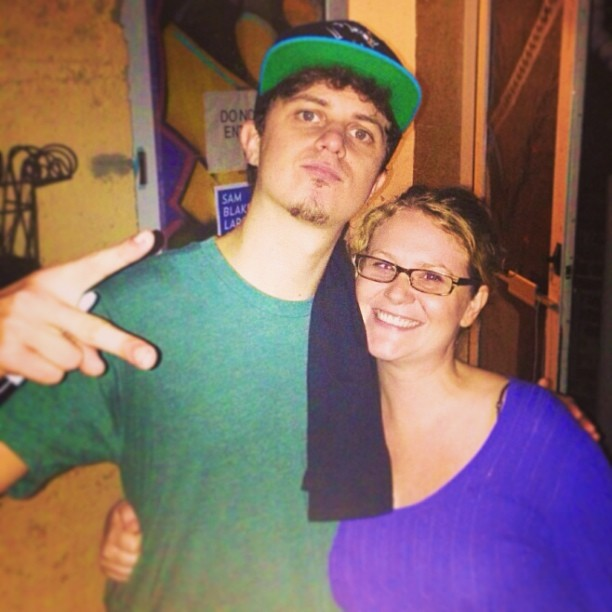
Watsky with a fan in 2013

On June 10, 2012, Watsky released a free mixtape entitled Nothing Like The First Time. The mixtape coincided with his first official tour of the same name beginning in July, featuring his touring band Créme Fraîche, with support from Dumbfoundead. It included dates in Chicago, New York City, Boston, Northampton, Jacksonville, Atlanta, Toronto, and London.

Watsky released Live! At the Troubadour, a fully mixed concert CD of his Los Angeles show from the Nothing Like The First Time tour, in August 2012. He also started a production company with Brad Simpson called Steel Wool Media.

In January 2013, Watsky announced he would be releasing a new album entitled Cardboard Castles on March 12, 2013. On the same date, he announced tour dates for the Cardboard Castles tour, which included dates in many major cities in the U.S. and Canada such as Austin, New Orleans, Gainesville, Orlando, D.C., Philadelphia, Northampton, Boston, Denver, Los Angeles, Toronto, Vancouver and New York City. Tour dates for Europe (including the UK, Germany, Switzerland, Austria, Belgium and the Netherlands) were released shortly after. The first single from the album, "Strong As An Oak" was released through Steel Wool Media on January 22, 2013. The second single from the album, "Moral of the Story" was released on February 5, 2013. The third single, "Hey, Asshole" was released on February 19, 2013, and features English singer Kate Nash.

The album was released on March 12, 2013, through Welk Music Group, topping the iTunes Hip Hop Charts in the US, Canada, and the United Kingdom due in part to a Twitter campaign. He then went on his follow-up to the Nothing Like The First Time tour called "Sloppy Seconds."

Watsky made a web-series with YouTube channel LOUD titled Watsky's Making an Album. It consisted of 9 main episodes and many behind the scenes and live videos from the Nothing Like The First Time tour. The web series was restarted on March 12, 2013, with the first episode of Season 2 (entitled Watsky's Releasing An Album), coinciding with the release of his second album, Cardboard Castles.

In November 2013 the Vans Warped Tour was briefly shut down after Watsky made a stage jump from the 35 ft high rigging during the band's performance in London. During the stage jump the audience parted. Watsky and also two members of the audience were injured. Watsky apologized after the event via Facebook.

==== 2014–2015: All You Can Do and the Meaner Than The Average Tour ====
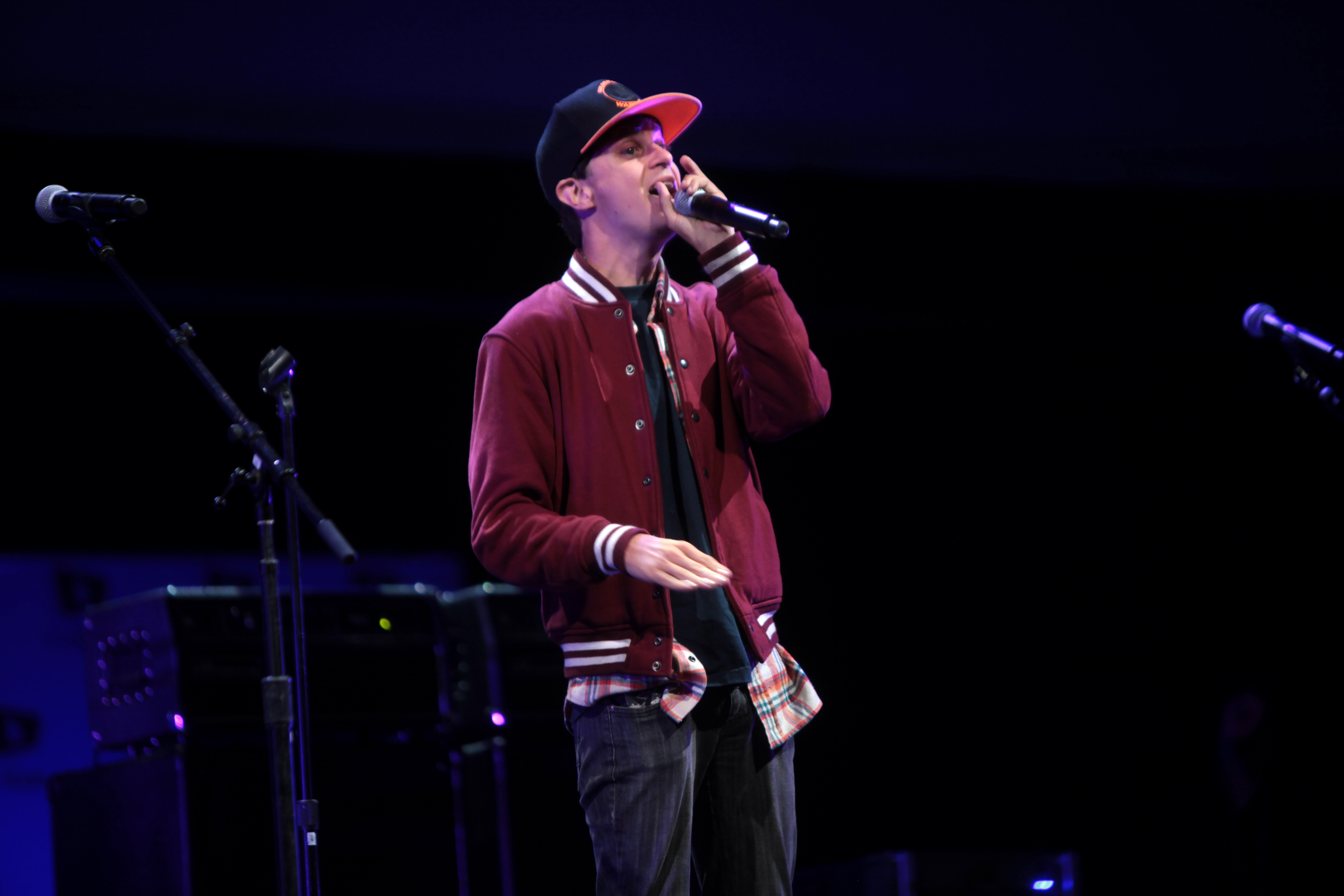
Watsky performing at VidCon in 2014

On January 2, 2014, Watsky tweeted that he was beginning work on his third studio album, then tweeted a link to a picture of a microphone with the caption "The Booth #guardianangel" less than a minute later. This was the first sign of new music from Watsky since March 2013, when he released his second album, Cardboard Castles.

On May 21, 2014, during one of his Watsky Wednesday vlogs, he announced that the title of his new album would be All You Can Do, as well as explaining that he wanted to keep his family ties in the album (announcing that his father would be on the cover and that he would like his mother to be on an alternate cover) and that the album would be released in August. He had tweeted earlier in the month that the first single from All You Can Do would be released on June 10, 2014.

The album was made available for preorder on June 10, 2014, on iTunes (with a download of the first single," Whoa Whoa Whoa"); a physical copy and limited edition double-vinyl were made available for pre-order on his website. It included collaborations with Anderson .Paak, Dia Frampton and Stephen Stills among others, and is Watsky's highest-charting album to date, reaching number 33 on the Billboard 200. The All You Can Do Tour spanned across North America, Europe, and Australia, consisting of over 60 headlining shows. His live band Créme Fraîche consists of Max Miller-Loran (keys/trumpet), Kush Mody (keys, bass) Pat Dimitri (guitar), Chukwudi Hodge (drums) and others.

In December 2014, Watsky's YouTube channel was listed on New Media Rockstars Top 100 Channels, ranked at No. 51.

On May 30, 2015, Watsky announced through social media that he would be releasing All You Can Do: Live From The Regency Ballroom, the live album that he recorded during the All You Can Do tour, on June 2 on BitTorrent, Bandcamp, Spotify, iTunes and SoundCloud. He also announced that he would be embarking on a monthlong club tour, called the Meaner Than The Average tour, with Créme Fraîche, A-1, and Mikos Da Gawd in late July and August. The focus of the tour would be to hit cities that he didn't get to on the All You Can Do tour. He also said that many of the shows would be in various Canadian cities that he has never performed in.

In January 2016, he announced through various YouTube videos that he would release an album due sometime in the summer.

==== 2016–2017: x Infinity and The Hamilton Mixtape ====
On July 8, 2016, Watsky announced a new album titled x Infinity, as well as an upcoming tour (in America and Europe) on Twitter and Facebook. The album's lead producer is long-time collaborator Kush Mody, while Def Jam Recordings co-founder Russell Simmons was an executive producer. It was released on August 19, 2016, and included Josh Dun, Julia Nunes, and Chaos Chaos as collaborators. The album's bonus track "Exquisite Corpse", referencing the poetry game, features seven guest verses rapped by Dumbfoundead, Grieves, Adam Vida, Wax, Rafael Casal, Daveed Diggs, and Chinaka Hodge. Watsky embarked on his x Infinity tour on September 2, 2016, in Phoenix, Arizona, and was slated to finish in Los Angeles at the end of November, but he later added stops in Anchorage, Alaska on December 1, and his final show in Honolulu, Hawaii on December 10, 2016. The album reached 58th on the US Billboard 200.

In December 2016, Watsky contributed a song to The Hamilton Mixtape, a project of Lin-Manuel Miranda, for whom Watsky previously performed in 2015 at a #Ham4Ham event. On the mixtape, he performed "An Open Letter" with the artist Shockwave. This was an adapted form of a rap cut from the song "The Adams Administration" in the original show, in which Hamilton refutes insults and rumors spread about him from President John Adams.

==== 2018–present: Complaint, Placement, Invisible Inc. reunion, and Intention ====
In March 2018, Watsky regrouped with his band Invisible Inc. for their ten-year anniversary. The group released a single entitled "Fine Print" and went on tour. It was announced that their next album, "Fine Print", would premiere on March 30, 2018.

In August 2018, Watsky released a single entitled 'Welcome to the Family'. He announced at a show in October that his next album, “Complaint,” would be released.

On January 11, 2019, Watsky released his fifth album, Complaint. Complaint would later exist to be part of a 3 part album series. On the same day he announced the Complaint tour which spanned from January to April 2019. The tour traveled most of North America as well as Europe and the United Kingdom with support from Grieves, Beau Young Prince, and Feed the Biirds. On January 15, Watsky released the single "Whitecaps" which was featured off the Complaint album. In February, Watsky also released a self illustrated book of the Complaint album lyrics which was sold on his merch site.

On April 27, 2019, Watsky co-hosted The Get Lit Grand Slam Finals at The Theater at the Ace Hotel in Los Angeles. The Get Lit program is for high school students studying poetry in organized after school programs where students compete to win scholarships for their team. Shortly after on May 11, 2019, Watsky performed poetry at the Arcosanti, Arizona based music and arts festival FORM. Watsky also released a free VR concert of his Welcome to the Family tour's show in Boulder Colorado which was featured by NextVR. Later in the year, on November 13, 2019, Watsky released the single, "Advanced Placement", which would be his first single release off his 2020 album Placement. A week later he announced his "Advanced Placement Tour", which was scheduled to travel across North America. The tour included support acts from Travis Thompson, Feed the Biirds, Nikki Jean, G Yamazawa, Hollis, Ed Balloon, Grieves, Suppose, A-1, Danny J, Garth, Wax, Chukwudi Hodge, Mikos Da Gawd and a co-headline date in Denver, CO with Hobo Johnson.

On January 31, 2020, Watsky released the single "Undermine" feat. Raquel Rodriguez, which would also appear on his upcoming album Placement. He appeared on Dumbfoundead's podcast Fun with Dumb on February 20, where he discussed the significance of the album and how it was the second of a three-album series. Which hinted towards the numbers at the bottom of the Complaint artwork which had 1.3 printed in the corner, and Placement having 2.3 in the corner of the artwork that was announced on February 15. His sixth album, Placement, was self-released on March 6, 2020. At this time the tour name changed from the "Advanced Placement Tour" to the "Placement Album Tour". Two days later on March 8, Watsky released his third single from the album, "Best Friend the Floor". The tour was scheduled to start in Santa Fe, New Mexico, on March 24 but due to outbreak of COVID-19 the tour was announced as postponed on March 13. It has since been canceled, with Watsky instead going on the road with his band and crew to work on material for his next album.

Watsky's new album Intention was released on February 24, 2023. Watsky announced via social media the day prior to his album releasing that Intention may be his final album, and that it feels like the end of his persona, "Watsky". Although he stated that this might be his final album, he also stated in the same social media post that he will continue to make art.

=== Acting ===
In May 2013, Watsky appeared in season 4 of Arrested Development as Chris Kazmierczak.

Watsky has documented the process it takes to create albums in a couple of TV series. He has also appeared in several Epic Rap Battles of History videos, rapping as and portraying one of the battling characters. To date, he has played William Shakespeare, the Fourth Doctor from Doctor Who, and Edgar Allan Poe.

Watsky appeared as Tanner in the film Blindspotting, which was released in 2018.

=== Writing ===
In June 2016, Watsky published a collection of his essays in a book entitled How to Ruin Everything. It entered the top ten in The New York Times Best Seller list, and received public praise from Lin-Manuel Miranda, John Green, Russell Simmons, Hasan Minhaj, Jeff Chang, Adam Mansbach, Rhys Darby, Myq Kaplan, and Chinaka Hodge.

=== Rapping world record ===
On May 6, 2020, Watsky beat the world record for the longest continuous freestyle rap. He rapped for 33 hours, 33 minutes, and 19 seconds, beating the previous record by over seven hours. In attempting to do so, he raised over $140,000 for the Sweet Relief Musicians Fund, a non-profit charity which raises money for music artists and crew members affected financially by COVID-19 event cancellations. Watsky held the record for 3 years until Japanese rapper PONEY beat the record at 48 hours in April 2023.

== Discography ==
=== Studio albums ===
- Watsky (2009)
- Cardboard Castles (2013)
- All You Can Do (2014)
- x Infinity (2016)
- Complaint (2019)
- Placement (2020)
- Intention (2023)

=== Invisible Inc. ===
- Invisible Inc. (2007)
- Fine Print (2018)

== Tours ==
Headlining

- Nothing Like the First Time Tour (2012)
- Cardboard Castles Tour (2013)
- All You Can Do Tour (2014)
- Meaner Than the Average Tour (2015)
- x Infinity Tour (2016)
- Welcome to the Family Tour (2018)
- Complaint Tour (2019)
- Intention Tour (2023)
- x Infinity Tenth Anniversary Tour (2026)

Co-headlining

- Hug a Hater Tour (with Wax) (2013)
- Low Visibility Tour (with Invisible Inc.) (2018)

== Bibliography ==
- Undisputed Backtalk Champion (2006) (Note: Undisputed Backtalk Champion is a collection of poetry by Watsky and in associated with Youth Speaks, Inc. It was released with an accompanying audio CD called Undisputed Backtalk Champion: Behind the Book featuring live poetry slam performances.)
- How to Ruin Everything: Essays (2016)
- COMPLAINT Illustrated (2019)
- PLACEMENT Illustrated (2020)
- Watsky Notated (2020) (Note: Watsky Notated is a notated music book with transcriptions by frequent collaborator Kush Mody.)
