= Heavy Is the Crown (album) =

Studio album by Anderson .Paak and Cordae
- Released: October 23, 2026
- Genre: Hip-hop
- Length: 31:57
- Labels: Apeshit; Mass Appeal; Empire
- Producers: 9th Wonder; Caleb Oh; The Collective; FnZ; Hollywood Cole; J. Cole; Soul Rasheed; Swizz Beatz; Conductor Williams

Anderson .Paak chronology
Why Lawd? (2024)	Heavy Is the Crown (2026)

Cordae chronology
The Crossroads (2024)	Heavy Is the Crown (2026)

Singles from Heavy Is the Crown
- 1. "A Good Day" Released: September 16, 2026

Heavy Is the Crown is a collaborative studio album by the American singer and rapper Anderson .Paak and the American rapper Cordae. The album was released on October 23, 2026, through Apeshit, Mass Appeal Records, and Empire Distribution. It features production from FnZ, J. Cole, 9th Wonder, Swizz Beatz, Conductor Williams, and .Paak's son Soul Rasheed, among others.

== Background and release ==
Anderson .Paak and Cordae first collaborated on Cordae's song "RNP" from his debut album The Lost Boy (2019), then worked together again on two tracks from Cordae's third album The Crossroads (2024). Heavy Is the Crown was announced as a full collaborative album on August 19, 2026, with .Paak posting a video of him and Cordae posing for the album's cover photo, which is inspired by the poster for the 2008 comedy film Step Brothers. On September 16, they released the first single, "A Good Day", alongside a music video directed by Dave Meyers and inspired by the 1995 comedy film Friday.

On October 15, 2026, Florida-based record label MMMG Inc., which signed Cordae in 2018, filed a lawsuit against him, Empire Distribution, Apeshit, and Mass Appeal Records for alleged contract and copyright violations. MMMG attempted to stop the album's release by sending a cease and desist letter the day after its announcement, claiming that they have "full ownership of [Cordae's] recorded copyrights along with exclusive merchandising, touring and endorsement rights".

At the New York Comic Con in October 2026, Mass Appeal Records released a tie-in comic book created in collaboration with Marvel Comics and featuring cover art by the Japanese artist Peach Momoko. To promote the release, .Paak and Cordoe collaborated with Complex Networks to host a pop-up exhibition from October 22–24, 2026, which included a listening party, merchandise, and a meet-and-greet.

The album was released on October 23, 2026, via Apeshit, Mass Appeal Records, and Empire Distribution, in CD, digital download, streaming, vinyl, and cassette tape formats. A vinyl record featuring alternate artwork by the American artist Lauren Halsey was also made available on the album's web store.

== Track listing ==
Heavy Is the Crown track listing
No.	Title	Writer(s)	Producer(s)	Length
1.	"58th Floor"	Brandon Paak Anderson; Cordae Amari Brooks; Jermaine Cole	J. Cole	2:55
2.	"Airbender"	B. Anderson; Brooks; Kameron Cole; Dominic Frontiere	Hollywood Cole	1:28
3.	"I'm On"	B. Anderson; Brooks; K. Cole; Isaac De Boni; Michael Mulé; Paul Jules Peters; Huey Williams	FnZ; Hollywood Cole	3:53
4.	"A Good Day"	B. Anderson; Brooks; Johntá Austin; Mariah Carey; K. Cole; Douglas Davis; Jermaine Dupri; Isaac Freeman; Clarence Scarborough; Manuel Seal; Ricky Walters; William Withers	Hollywood Cole	2:31
5.	"You're Mine"	B. Anderson; Brooks; Eumir Deodato; Patrick Douthit; Ray Gilbert; Paulo Sérgio Valle	9th Wonder	2:47
6.	"Days Go By"	B. Anderson; Brooks; Caleb Anderson; Soul Rasheed Anderson; Gamal Lewis; Piero Umiliani	Caleb Oh; Soul Rasheed	3:22
7.	"Crown"	B. Anderson; Brooks; Dana Middleton; L.J. Reynolds; Jeffrey Smith; Denzel Williams	Conductor Williams	2:39
8.	"Days Like This"	B. Anderson; Brooks; Aaron Green; Marques Murrey	The Collective	3:23
9.	"Karma Tax"	B. Anderson; Brooks; Dwayne Abernathy Jr.; J. Cole	J. Cole; Dem Jointz^{[c]}	2:14
10.	"Helpless"	B. Anderson; Brooks; De Boni; Jerry Leiber; Mulé; Ralph Palladino; John Sembello	FnZ	3:38
11.	"Godfather II"	B. Anderson; Brooks; Kasseem Dean	Swizz Beatz	3:03
Total length:				31:57

=== Notes ===
- ^{^[c]} indicates a co-producer
- "A Good Day" contains samples of "Lovely Day" by Bill Withers and "Be Faithful" by Fatman Scoop.

== Personnel ==
Credits are adapted from Tidal.

- Anderson .Paak – vocals
- Cordae – vocals
- Jeremie Inhaber – mixing
- Dave Rowland – engineering (tracks 1–6, 9–11), mixing assistance (all tracks)
- Jhair Jha Lazo – engineering (1, 2, 4–11)
- Mesa D – engineering (1, 4, 5, 7, 11)
- Vic Luevanos – engineering (1)
- Connor – engineering (2, 3, 6)
- Laura Mercedes Garcia – engineering (6)
- Irv Johnson – immersive engineering
- Emerson Mancini – mastering
- Dem Jointz – background vocals (9)

== Charts ==
Chart performance for Heavy Is the Crown
Chart (2026)	Peak position
Belgian Albums (Ultratop Flanders)	160
Irish Independent Albums (IRMA)	48
Japanese Digital Albums (Oricon)	70
Japanese Download Albums (Billboard Japan)	47
Portuguese Albums (AFP)	194
Swiss Albums (Schweizer Hitparade)	90
UK Albums Sales (Official Charts)	31
UK Independent Albums (Official Charts)	13
UK R&B Albums (Official Charts)	2
US Billboard 200	11
US Independent Albums (Billboard)	1
US Top R&B/Hip-Hop Albums (Billboard)	2
