= From a Birds Eye View (album) =

2022 album by Cordae

Studio album by Cordae
- Released: January 14, 2022
- Genre: Hip-hop
- Length: 41:36
- Labels: Atlantic; Art@War; Hi-Level
- Producers: 1Mind; Audi; Beat Butcha; Boi-1da; BongoByTheWay; Cardiak; Cordae; Daoud; Hit-Boy; Hollywood Cole; Jake One; Jenius; Kid Culture; Matty Spats; Don Mills; Nami; Nils; Sholz; Sool Got Hits; Jack Uriah; Vinylz

Cordae chronology
| Just Until... (2021) | From a Birds Eye View (2022) | The Crossroads (2024) |

Singles from From a Birds Eye View
- 1. "Gifted" Released: August 27, 2020; 2. "Super" Released: October 7, 2021; 3. "Sinister" Released: December 3, 2021

From a Birds Eye View is the second studio album by American rapper Cordae. It was released through Atlantic Records and Art@War on January 14, 2022. The album features guest appearances from Gunna, Lil Wayne, H.E.R., Lil Durk, Freddie Gibbs, Stevie Wonder, Eminem, and Roddy Ricch.

== Background ==
In an August 2020 interview with Apple Music, Cordae said, "I'm like a hundred songs deep in. Like this next one, I'm really taking everything to a whole 'nother level. I really love doing music and perfecting my craft and I'm getting better every day. And the new music from here on out is going to show that".

In a January 2022 Billboard interview, the rapper discussed the inspiration behind the album, emphasizing that the project is more "memory-driven" than his debut. He mentions life experiences, including being arrested at a protest, visiting slave dungeons in Egypt and Ghana, and losing his childhood best friend, as significant influences on the album's content. On the album's title, he said, "I think about my legacy all the time... always just trying to think and look at the bigger picture from a broader perspective. From a bird's eye view."

== Release and promotion ==
The bonus track on the album, "Gifted", features Roddy Ricch and was released on August 27, 2020, with a music video directed by Cole Bennett. The track was produced by Cordae, Bongo ByTheWay, and Ray Keys.

The album's second single, "Super", was released on October 7, 2021, alongside a music video. The single was produced by Jack Uriah, Kid Culture, and Jenius.

The album's third single, "Sinister", was released on December 3, 2021, along with a music video and a guest appearance from American rapper Lil Wayne. The single was produced by Hit-Boy.

== Critical reception ==
Professional ratings
Aggregate scores
| Source | Rating |
|---|---|
| Metacritic | 71/100 |
Review scores
| Source | Rating |
| AllMusic | 3/5 stars |
| Clash | 7/10 |
| HipHopDX | 2.9/5 |
| HotNewHipHop | 79% |
| NME | 5/5 stars |
| Pitchfork | 5.0/10 |

From a Birds Eye View was met with positive reviews. At Metacritic, which assigns a normalized rating out of 100 to reviews from mainstream publications, the album received an average score of 71, based on seven reviews.

Notably, NME gave the album a perfect rating, writing, "The older generation may wish to cast doubt on younger artists, but he breathes hope into the continuation of hip-hop with his imaginative, playful flows. From a Birds Eye View is a true delight, revealing greater depth with each listen, and Cordae truly seems to be having fun while proving he's here to stay." Clash praised the album's "amazing moments of storytelling and technical rapping", though the reviewer noted that tracks such as "C Carter" fell short of Cordae's standards.

More mixed reviews came from AllMusic and Pitchfork. Jayson Buford wrote, "It's easy to tune out Cordae's music because he doesn't have an ethos that separates his music from other rappers with a working-class worldview." Fred Thomas wrote, "Still in command of strong technical skills and now rapping over instrumentals crafted with bigger budgets, Cordae falls short when he starts sounding a little too comfortably at home in the mainstream."

== Track listing ==
From a Birds Eye View track listing
| No. | Title | Writer(s) | Producer(s) | Length |
|---|---|---|---|---|
| 1. | "Shiloh's Intro" | Shiloh Young | Kid Culture | 1:08 |
| 2. | "Jean-Michel" | Cordae Dunston; Daniel Hackett | Kid Culture; Raphael Saadiq^{[b]} | 2:43 |
| 3. | "Super" | Dunston; Hackett; Julius-Alexander Brown; Jack Uriah; Willie Chambers; Andre Goodwin | Kid Culture; Jenius; Uriah | 2:57 |
| 4. | "Momma's Hood" | Dunston; Daoud Anthony; Rasool Diaz | Daoud; Sool Got Hits; 1Mind; Beat Butcha | 3:32 |
| 5. | "Want From Me" | Dunston; Jacob Dutton; Pamela Phillips; Vincent Brantley; Rickey Smith | Jake One; Dem Jointz^{[b]} | 3:50 |
| 6. | "Today" (featuring Gunna) | Dunston; Sergio Kitchens; Hackett | Kid Culture | 3:02 |
| 7. | "Shiloh's Interlude" | | Kid Culture | 0:22 |
| 8. | "C Carter" | Dunston; Anthony; Kameron Cole | Daoud; Hollywood Cole | 3:13 |
| 9. | "Sinister" (featuring Lil Wayne) | Dunston; Dwayne Carter, Jr.; Chauncey Hollis; Rafael Brown | Hit-Boy; Audio Anthem^{[a]} | 2:28 |
| 10. | "Chronicles" (featuring H.E.R. and Lil Durk) | Dunston; Gabriella Wilson; Durk Banks; Matthew Samuels; Miloš Angelov; Tahrence Brown | Boi-1da; Don Mills; Audi; Vinylz | 3:32 |
| 11. | "Champagne Glasses" (featuring Freddie Gibbs and Stevie Wonder) | Dunston; Fredrick Tipton; Stevland Morris; Hackett | Kid Culture | 4:17 |
| 12. | "Westlake High" | Dunston; Hackett; Matthew Spatola; Shola Fagbemi; George Kerr | Kid Culture; Matty Spats; Sholz | 2:56 |
| 13. | "Parables (Remix)" (featuring Eminem) | Dunston; Marshall Mathers; Carl McCormick; Dylan Teixeira; Hackett | Cardiak; Nami; Kid Culture | 4:46 |
| 14. | "Gifted" (featuring Roddy Ricch) (Bonus Track) | Dunston; Rodrick Moore; Anthony Clemons; Uforo Ebong; Hackett; Raymond Komba | Cordae; BongoByTheWay; Kid Culture^{[a]}; Ray Keys^{[a]}; Tarron Crayton^{[b]}; Russ Chell^{[b]}; Daytrip^{[b]} | 2:48 |
| Total length: | | | | 41:34 |

Notes

- ^{^[a]} signifies a co-producer
- ^{^[b]} signifies an additional producer
- "Gifted" features uncredited vocals from Ant Clemons

== Personnel ==
- Cordae – vocals
- Emerson Mancini (Note: Mancini, who publicly came out as a trans man in January 2023, is credited by his deadname.) – mastering (tracks 1–13)
- Mike Dean – mastering, mixing (14)
- Manny Marroquin – mixing (1–4, 6–13)
- Derek "MixedByAli" Ali – mixing (5, 14)
- Curtis "Sircut" Bye – mixing (5)
- RJ Cardenas – recording (1–13)
- Chris Dennis – recording (14)
- Bren Ferry – engineering (14)
- Anthony Vilchis – mixing assistance (1–4, 6–13)
- Zach Pereyra – mixing assistance (1–4, 6–13)
- Shiloh Young – vocals (1, 7)
- Stalone – additional vocals (5)

== Charts ==
Chart performance for From a Birds Eye View
| Chart (2022) | Peak position |
|---|---|
| Australian Albums (ARIA) | 44 |
| Belgian Albums (Ultratop Flanders) | 93 |
| Canadian Albums (Billboard) | 18 |
| Dutch Albums (Album Top 100) | 68 |
| Irish Albums (IRMA) | 83 |
| New Zealand Albums (RMNZ) | 28 |
| Swiss Albums (Schweizer Hitparade) | 55 |
| UK Albums (Official Charts) | 100 |
| UK R&B Albums (Official Charts) | 21 |
| US Billboard 200 | 13 |
