= BongoByTheWay =

Nigerian producer and songwriter

Bongo ByTheWay
- Also known as: Bongo on the Beat
- Born: Port Harcourt, Rivers, Nigeria
- Origin: Sylmar, California, U.S.
- Education: University of North Florida (BS)
- Genres: R&B; soul; hip hop
- Occupations: Record producer; songwriter
- Formerly of: L&F

Uforo Imeh Ebong (born 1989), known professionally as Bongo ByTheWay and Bongo on the Beat (formerly Bongo the Drum Gahd) is a Nigerian record producer, best known for producing songs for Kanye West, The Game, Lecrae, and Teyana Taylor, among others. Originally working alongside his cousin Christopher "C4" Umana in production outfit L&F (short for "Lost and Found"), Ebong moved to Los Angeles, California for wider music opportunities. L&F parted ways amicably in 2015 to pursue individual songwriting and production careers.

== Discography ==
Credits are courtesy of Discogs, Tidal, Apple Music, Genius, and AllMusic.

=== Executive-produced/co-written projects ===
Albums with ~ 50% Bongo production/songwriting credits or more
Album	Artist	Year	Label
Trouble in Paradise	Chlöe	2024	Parkwood | Columbia Records

=== Production and songwriting credits ===
Title	Year	Artist	Album
"Radio" «»	2008	Musiq Soulchild	OnMyRadio
"Free From It All" (Featuring Mathai)	2012	Lecrae	Gravity
"Why Lie"	2012	Keyshia Cole	Woman to Woman
"Y.A.S. (You Ain't Shit)" «»	2014	Trey Songz	Trigga
"Outta My League (Interlude)" «»	2014	Teyana Taylor	VII
"Outta My League" «»	2014	Teyana Taylor	VII
"Show Me" (Featuring Jeremih) «»	2014	Omarion	Sex Playlist
"Boss" (Featuring Rick Ross) «»	2014	Omarion	Sex Playlist
"Already" «»	2014	Omarion	Sex Playlist
"Jit/Juke" «»	2014	Big Sean	Non-album single
"I Won't Cry" «»	2014	Bridget Kelly	Non-album single
"Almost More" «»	2014	Bridget Kelly	Non-album single
"Last One Standing"	2015	Eric Bellinger	Cuffing Season
"Stay Down" «»	2015	Big Sean	Dark Sky Paradise
"On Me" (Featuring Kendrick Lamar)	2015	The Game	The Documentary 2
"Step Up" (Featuring Dej Loaf & Sha Sha)	2015	The Game	The Documentary 2
"Made in America" (Featuring Marcus Black)	2015	The Game	The Documentary 2
"Hashtag" (Featuring Jelly Roll)	2015	The Game	The Documentary 2
"Circles" (Featuring Q-Tip, Eric Bellinger & Sha Sha)	2015	The Game	The Documentary 2
"Dedicated" (Featuring Future & Sonyae Elise)	2015	The Game	The Documentary 2
"Just Another Day"	2015	The Game	The Documentary 2
"Magnus Carlsen" (Featuring Anderson .Paak)	2015	The Game	The Documentary 2.5
"Gang Bang Anyway" (Featuring Jay Rock & Schoolboy Q)	2015	The Game	The Documentary 2.5
"Gang Related" (Featuring Asia Bryant)	2015	The Game	The Documentary 2.5
"Sex Skit"	2015	The Game	The Documentary 2.5
"For the Homies" (Featuring Micah and Payso)	2016	The Game	Streets of Compton
"Block Wars"	2016	The Game	Block Wars
"Uzis and Grenades" (Featuring Lorine Chia)	2016	The Game	Block Wars
"True Colors / It's On"	2016	The Game	1992
"I Grew Up on Wu-Tang"	2016	The Game	1992
"However Do You Want It"	2016	The Game	1992
"Stranger at the Table"	2016	Jeremih & Chance the Rapper	Merry Christmas Lil' Mama
"The Tragedy"	2016	Jeremih & Chance the Rapper	Merry Christmas Lil' Mama
"I Can Tell"	2016	Eric Bellinger	Eventually (Mixtape)
"God, Love, Sex, and Drugs"	2017	K. Michelle	Kimberly: The People I Used to Know
"Takes Two" (Featuring Jeremih)	2017	K. Michelle	Kimberly: The People I Used to Know
"Man Now"	2017	G Herbo	Humble Beast
"Vault"	2017	Keyshia Cole	11:11 Reset
"Ol Skool" (Featuring Dej Loaf & Jeremih)	2017	Sevyn Streeter	Girl Disrupted
"Don't Go" «»	2017	Kevin Ross	The Awakening
"Ex" (Featuring YG)	2017	Ty Dolla Sign	Beach House 3
"All Mine"	2018	Kanye West	Ye
"Hurry" (Featuring Kanye West)	2018	Teyana Taylor	K.T.S.E.
"Play"	2018	Jessie J	R.O.S.E.
"Meditate"	2018	Eric Bellinger	Meditation Music
"Back It Up" (Featuring BJ the Chicago Kid)	2019	Eric Bellinger	The Rebirth 2
"Welcome Home" (Featuring Nipsey Hussle)	2019	The Game	Born 2 Rap
"Bad Idea" (Featuring Chance the Rapper)	2019	YBN Cordae	The Lost Boy
"Family Matters" (Featuring Arin Ray)	2019	YBN Cordae	The Lost Boy
"We Gon Make It" (Featuring Meek Mill)	2019	YBN Cordae	The Lost Boy
"Know Better"	2019	Tinashe	Songs for You
"Ecstasy" (Featuring) Jeremih)	2019	Dreezy	Big Dreez
"OMG"	2020	K. Michelle	All Monsters Are Human
"69"	2020	Teyana Taylor	The Album
"Lose Each Other"	2020	Teyana Taylor	The Album
"Good 4 U"	2020	Ant Clemons	Happy 2 Be Here
"West Coast Shit" (Featuring Tyga & Quavo)	2020	Pop Smoke	Shoot for the Stars, Aim for the Moon
"No Reason" (Featuring Neeak)	2020	Luke James	For No Reason
"I Lost" (Featuring Big K.R.I.T.)	2020	Luke James	For No Reason
"Girl Like Me" (Featuring H.E.R.)	2021	Jazmine Sullivan	Heaux Tales
"Bout It, Bout It"	2021	Blair Perkins	Blair Perkins
"Power Love"	2021	Blair Perkins	Blair Perkins
"Reign Down"	2021	Blair Perkins	Blair Perkins
"No Idea"	2022	Mary J. Blige	Good Morning Gorgeous
"Here with Me" (Featuring Anderson .Paak)	2022	Mary J. Blige	Good Morning Gorgeous
"Love Will Never"	2022	Mary J. Blige	Good Morning Gorgeous
"No Smoke at the Polo Lounge" (Featuring Jeremih)	2022	The Game	Drillmatic – Heart vs. Mind
"Gifted" (Featuring Roddy Ricch & Ant Clemons)	2022	Cordae	From a Birds Eye View
"Consistency" (Featuring Jhené Aiko)	2022	Megan Thee Stallion	Traumazine
"Inner Peace" (Featuring Anderson .Paak)	2022	Chris Brown	Breezy
"Caliber"	2022	Coco Jones	What I Didn't Tell You
"Sunshine" (Featuring Lil Wayne & Childish Gambino)	2022	Latto	777
"Nothings Promised"	2024	Cordae	The Crossroads
"Now You Know"	2024	Cordae	The Crossroads
"Too Bad" (Featuring Anderson .Paak)	2025	G-Dragon	Übermensch
"Know Bout Me" (with GloRilla)	2025	Halle Bailey	Love?... or Something Like It
"Heaven"	2025	Halle Bailey	Love?... or Something Like It
"Braveface"	2025	Halle Bailey	Love?... or Something Like It
"Wake Up"	2026	Ari Lennox	Vacancy: Late Checkout (Deluxe)
"Show Me"	2026	Ari Lennox	Vacancy: Late Checkout (Deluxe)
"Speak Your Mind"	2026	Ari Lennox	Vacancy: Late Checkout (Deluxe)
"Leave Me Alone"	2026	Ari Lennox	Vacancy: Late Checkout (Deluxe)
"World Cup (Champions)"	2026	IShowSpeed	FIFA World Cup 2026 Official Album
"Need Your Love" (featuring JMSN)	2026	AZ Chike	No Rest for the Wicked
"Love or Something Like It" (featuring Lucky Daye)	2026	Halle Bailey	Love?... or Something Like It (Deluxe)

«» Released as part of L&F Productions

== Guest appearances ==
List of guest appearances, with other performing artists, showing year released and album name
Title	Year	Other performer(s)	Album
"Selah"	2019	Kanye West, Ant Clemons & Sunday Service Choir	Jesus Is King

== Awards and nominations ==
Year	Work	Awarding Body	Award	Result	Ref
2013	Gravity	44th GMA Dove Awards	Rap/Hip Hop Album of the Year	Won	
2019	"Bad Idea"	61st Annual Grammy Awards	Best Rap Song	Nominated	
2023	Good Morning Gorgeous	65th Annual Grammy Awards	Album of the Year	Nominated	
2026	"Headphones"	68th Annual Grammy Awards	Best Contemporary Christian Music Performance/Song	Nominated	

== See also ==
- List of Nigerian musicians
- Music of Port Harcourt
