= Super (Cordae song) =

2021 single by Cordae

Single by Cordae

from the album From a Birds Eye View
- Released: October 7, 2021
- Length: 2:57
- Label: Atlantic; Art@War; Hi-Level
- Songwriters: Cordae Dunston; Daniel Hackett; Julius-Alexander Brown; Jack Uriah; Willie Chambers; Andre Goodwin
- Producers: Kid Culture; Jenius; Uriah

Cordae singles chronology
"Taxes" (2021)	"Super" (2021)	"Sinister" (2021)

Music video
- "Super" on YouTube

"Super" is a song by American rapper Cordae, released on October 7, 2021, as the lead single from his second studio album From a Birds Eye View (2022). It was produced by Kid Culture, Jenius and Uriah. The song was also featured in the NBA 2k23 Soundtrack

== Composition ==
In the song, Cordae raps about his recent successes, such as earning $7 million in 2020 without doing a show, starring in a Coca-Cola commercial for the Super Bowl LIV, and his friendship with Twitter CEO Jack Dorsey. He also shouts out to Dr. Dre (mentioning his then-upcoming performance at the Super Bowl LVI halftime show), boasts about his crew and designer clothes, and explains that he left YBN due to a lack of ownership.

== Music video ==
The music video was directed by Arrad and released alongside the single. In it, Cordae stands atop a skyscraper at night, plays the roles of the CEO of "Cordae Cola" and a schoolteacher, prepares to be executed via guillotine surrounded by a large crowd, and rides through a city.

== Charts ==
Chart performance for "Super"
Chart (2021)	Peak position
New Zealand Hot Singles (RMNZ)	27
US Bubbling Under Hot 100 Singles	23

== Certifications ==
Certifications for "Super"
Region	Certification	Certified units/sales
Canada (Music Canada)	Gold	40,000^{‡}
United States (RIAA)	Gold	500,000^{‡}
^{‡} Sales+streaming figures based on certification alone.
