= IfULeave =

"Ifuleave"

Single by Musiq Soulchild featuring Mary J. Blige

from the album OnMyRadio
- Released: November 25, 2008 (U.S.)
- Recorded: 2008
- Genre: R&B; soul
- Length: 4:12
- Label: Atlantic
- Songwriters: Ivan Barias; Carvin Haggins; Taalib Johnson; John Lawson; Miguel Pimentel; Johnnie Smith
- Producers: Ivan "Orthodox" Barias; Carvin "Ransum" Haggins

Musiq Soulchild singles chronology
"Radio" (2008)	"Ifuleave" (2008)	"sobeautiful" (2009)

Mary J. Blige singles chronology
"Stay Down" (2008)	"IfULeave" (2008)	"Remember Me" (2009)

"Ifuleave" is the second single from Musiq Soulchild's fifth studio album, OnMyRadio, his second full-length release on Atlantic Records. The song features R&B singer Mary J. Blige.

== Charts ==
=== Weekly charts ===
Chart (2008–2009)	Peak position
US Billboard Hot 100	71
US Adult R&B Songs (Billboard)	1
US Hot R&B/Hip-Hop Songs (Billboard)	6

=== Year-end charts ===
Chart (2009)	Position
US Hot R&B/Hip-Hop Songs (Billboard)	28
