= Just Until... (EP) =

EP by Cordae
- Released: April 21, 2021
- Recorded: 2021
- Genre: Hip-hop
- Length: 11:58
- Label: Atlantic
- Producer: Cardiak; Daoud; Eric Hudson; Kid Culture; Mario Luciano; Q-Tip; Raphael Saadiq; Sool Got Hits; Take a Daytrip; Terrace Martin

Cordae chronology
| The Lost Boy (2019) | Just Until... (2021) | From a Birds Eye View (2022) |

Professional ratings
Review scores
| Source | Rating |
|---|---|
| HipHopDX | 3.6/5 |

Just Until... is an EP by American rapper Cordae, released on April 22, 2021, through Atlantic Records. The four-track record includes guest appearances from Q-Tip and Young Thug.

== Track listing ==
- Credits adapted from Tidal.

Just Until... track listing
| No. | Title | Producer(s) | Length |
|---|---|---|---|
| 1. | "More Life" (featuring Q-Tip) | Eric Hudson; Kid Culture; Q-Tip | 3:11 |
| 2. | "Dream in Color" | Daoud; Raphael Saadiq; Sool Got Hits; Terrace Martin | 3:02 |
| 3. | "Wassup" (featuring Young Thug) | Take a Daytrip | 2:44 |
| 4. | "Thornton Street" | Cardiak; Mario Luciano | 3:01 |
| Total length: | | | 11:58 |
