= Broke as Fuck =

Song by YBN Cordae

Song by YBN Cordae

from the album The Lost Boy
- Released: July 26, 2019
- Recorded: March 2019
- Genre: Hip hop; trap
- Length: 3:16
- Label: Atlantic; Art@War
- Songwriter(s): Cordae Dunston; Daniel Hackett; David Biral; Denzel Baptiste; Russ Chell; Darian Garcia; Cooper McGill; Justin Zim; Jariuce Banks
- Producer(s): Take a Daytrip; Russ Chell; CoopTheTruth; Kid Culture; Smoko Ono

Music video
- "Broke as F**k" on YouTube

"Broke as Fuck" is a song by American rapper YBN Cordae from his debut studio album The Lost Boy (2019). It was produced by Take a Daytrip.

== Composition ==
The song contains a trap beat that mainly consists of bass and keyboard. Lyrically, Cordae details his PTSD resulting from traumatic events in his life, such as the death of his grandmother, the murder of his cousin, and his brother being sentenced to prison. The beat switches halfway through the song.

== Critical reception ==
Scott Glaysher of HipHopDX regarded the song to be the "biggest and brashest 'banger'" from The Lost Boy. Leor Galil of Chicago Reader wrote, "when the vitriolic beat on 'Broke as Fuck' transitions into a sumptuous soul melody, he switches gears as smoothly and flawlessly as somebody who's been doing it since birth."

== Music video ==
An official music video was directed by Josh Forman released on August 15, 2019. In it, Cordae and his friends ride bicycles to a convenience store, where they cause havoc and shoplift. Cordae raps his verse until his friends run out of the store and he follows suit. While his friends escape, Cordae is shot by the clerk before he can. The song's beat switch then occurs. Cordae wakes up, finding himself in a mountain trail. Recreating the cover of The Lost Boy, Cordae wanders past a sign reading "The Lost Boy" that points to different paths.

== Charts ==
Chart performance for "Broke as Fuck"
| Chart (2019) | Peak position |
|---|---|
| New Zealand Hot Singles (RMNZ) | 22 |
