= Kung Fu (YBN Cordae song) =

2018 single by YBN Cordae

Single by YBN Cordae

from the album YBN: The Mixtape
- Released: July 13, 2018
- Genre: Hip-hop
- Length: 3:19
- Songwriters: Cordae Dunston; David Biral; Denzel Baptiste
- Producers: Take a Daytrip; Russ Chell

YBN Cordae singles chronology
"Fighting Temptations" (2018)	"Kung Fu" (2018)	"Alaska" (2018)

Music video
- "Kung Fu" on YouTube

"Kung Fu" is a song by American rapper YBN Cordae, released in July 2018. It is the lead single from YBN's only mixtape, YBN: The Mixtape (2018). Produced by Take a Daytrip, it is considered Cordae's breakout single.

== Critical reception ==
The song received generally positive reviews from music critics. Alex Zidel of HotNewHipHop gave the song a "Very Hottttt" rating and wrote, "With seemingly unlimited potential, Cordae's 'Kung Fu' has the rapper exploring his flows and melodies, going hard on an original loop, produced by Day Trip. With his exposure gaining by the day, Cordae is definitely worth your attention. Where does 'Kung Fu' rank in terms of his previous singles?" Trey Alston of Highsnobiety had a mixed response to the song, calling it "a little rough around the edges" and writing, "The production, while fitting of the ominous nature of most of the tracks on YBN: The Mixtape, isn't Cordae's forte. If he believes it is, he needs to take a long, hard, look in the mirror. Lyrical rap is at odds with new age's trap-esque beat catalog. Mixing the two just doesn't sound as good, no matter who does it." The song was ranked number 2 on The Washington Post's list of "The best DMV rap songs and albums of 2018".

== Music video ==
A music video for the song was directed by PplCallMeAce and released on July 11, 2018. It finds Cordae hanging out on the block with boys and girls, and riding in a lime green Mercedes-Benz G-Class through a residential neighborhood.

== Certifications ==
Region	Certification	Certified units/sales
Canada (Music Canada)	Gold	40,000^{‡}
New Zealand (RMNZ)	Gold	15,000^{‡}
United States (RIAA)	Gold	500,000^{‡}
^{‡} Sales+streaming figures based on certification alone.
