= RNP (song) =

2019 single by YBN Cordae

Single by YBN Cordae featuring Anderson .Paak

from the album The Lost Boy
- Released: July 23, 2019
- Genre: Hip-hop; R&B
- Length: 2:56
- Label: Atlantic; Art@War
- Songwriters: Cordae Dunston; Brandon Anderson; Jermaine Cole
- Producer: J. Cole

YBN Cordae singles chronology
"Racks" (2019)	"RNP" (2019)	"In These Streets" (2019)

Anderson .Paak singles chronology
"Make It Better" (2019)	"RNP" (2019)	"Stainless" (2019)

Music video
- "RNP" on YouTube

"RNP" ("Rich Nigga Problems") is a song by American rapper Cordae (then known as YBN Cordae) featuring fellow American rapper and singer Anderson .Paak. It was released on July 23, 2019, as the third single from Cordae's debut studio album The Lost Boy (2019). Written by the artists alongside producer J. Cole, It was Cordae's highest-charting song, until the release of "Gifted" featuring Roddy Ricch.

== Composition ==
The song finds Cordae and Anderson .Paak trading "bars about their 'rich nigga problems'". The former "effortlessly blends his nostalgic influences with his current surrounding", and "a gaudy chorus that parallels excess wealth to a boom-bap inspired instrumental" is sung by the latter. Althea Legaspi of Rolling Stone writes that their rhymes "playfully glide over Cole's bouncy beats and slinky production."

== Music video ==
The music video was released on October 14, 2019. It is a 1970s-themed visual and was directed by APlus Filmz. Cordae and Anderson .Paak are basketball players "Big Play" and "Sweet Shot" respectively, and "rock afro wigs and furs in homage to Blaxploitation action films". Paak convinces Cordae to have them hit the "biggest lick of their lives" worth more than a million dollars instead of showing up at their championship game, but they eventually make it to the tournament to help their losing team win.

== Live performances ==
Cordae and Paak have performed the song on The Tonight Show Starring Jimmy Fallon and at the 2019 BET Hip Hop Awards.

== Charts ==
Chart (2019)	Peak position
Canada Hot 100 (Billboard)	84
Ireland (IRMA)	92
New Zealand Hot Singles (RMNZ)	4
US Bubbling Under Hot 100 (Billboard)	15

== Certifications ==
Region	Certification	Certified units/sales
Canada (Music Canada)	Gold	40,000^{‡}
New Zealand (RMNZ)	2× Platinum	60,000^{‡}
United States (RIAA)	Gold	500,000^{‡}
^{‡} Sales+streaming figures based on certification alone.
