= OnMyRadio =

Studio album by Musiq Soulchild
- Released: December 9, 2008
- Recorded: 2007–2008
- Genres: R&B, neo soul
- Length: 50:24
- Labels: Atlantic; Soulstar; Soli Ridge
- Producers: Christopher Umana, Dru Castro, Uforo Ebong, Anthony Life, JR Hutson, Ivan "Orthodox" Barias & Carvin "Ransum" Haggins, Warryn "Baby Dubb" Campbell, Musiq Soulchild

Musiq Soulchild chronology
Luvanmusiq (2007)	OnMyRadio (2008)	MusiqInTheMagiq (2011)

Professional ratings
Aggregate scores
Source	Rating
Metacritic	(75/100)
Review scores
Source	Rating
About.com	4/5 stars
Allmusic	3.5/5 stars
The Boston Globe	(favorable)
The Dallas Morning News	B+
Entertainment Weekly	B+
Okayplayer	(83/100)
The Phoenix	2.5/4 stars
Toronto Star	3/4 stars
USA Today	3/4 stars
Vibe	3.5/5 stars

OnMyRadio is R&B singer-songwriter Musiq Soulchild's fifth studio album. It was released on December 9, 2008.

The album entered the Billboard 200 chart at number 11, selling 91,498 copies its first week. It entered the Billboard Top R&B/Hip-Hop Albums chart at number 82 through street sales and, in its second week, jumped to number 1.

== Singles ==
The first single to be taken from the album was "Radio". It was sent to US radio stations in August 2008, and charted on Billboard's Hot R&B/Hip-Hop songs chart.

The album's second single, "IfULeave", was released to radio in October 2008.

The third single was "SoBeautiful".

== Track listing ==
No.	Title	Writer(s)	Length
1.	"Backagain"	Musiq Soulchild, Campbell, Campbell, Morales, Wimbley	4:06
2.	"Until"	Soulchild, Campbell, Gaye, Fraustro, Jones, Stanton, Wilson	3:31
3.	"IfULeave" (featuring Mary J. Blige)	Soulchild, Barias, Haggins, Lawson, Miguel Pimentel, Smith	4:12
4.	"Deserveumore"	Soulchild, Barias, Haggins, Tellington, C. Williams	3:52
5.	"Special"	Soulchild, Barias, Haggins, Stephens	3:18
6.	"Dearjohn"	Soulchild, Campbell, Morton	4:31
7.	"Loveofmylife"	Soulchild, Campbell, Dawkins, Dixon, Sledge	5:13
8.	"Moneyright"	Soulchild, Campbell, Fauntleroy, Jones	4:38
9.	"Someone"	Soulchild, Barias, Church, Guinn, Haggins, Poyser	4:36
10.	"Iwannabe" (featuring Damian Marley)	Soulchild, Campbell, Dawkins, Marley, Sledge, Starr	4:21
11.	"SoBeautiful"	Soulchild, JR Hutson	4:51
12.	"Radio"	Soulchild, Castro, Ebong, Umana	3:20

== Personnel ==
- Nick Banns – Assistant Engineer
- Ivan "Orthodox" Barias – Audio Production, composer, Drum Programming, engineer, Instrumentation, Keyboards, producer, Programmer, Programming, Various Instruments
- Adam Blackstone – Guitar (Bass)
- Mary J. Blige – Featured Artist, Primary Artist, Vocals
- Bruce Buechner – Engineer, Mixing
- Joi Campbell – Arranger, composer, Vocal Arrangement
- Sandra Campbell – Project Coordinator
- Warryn Campbell – Arranger, Audio Production, composer, Instrumentation, producer, Programming, Various Instruments, Vocal Arrangement, Vocals (Background)
- Terrence Cash – Engineer
- Dru Castro – Audio Production, composer, engineer, producer
- Curt Chambers – Guitar
- Corey Church – Composer
- Sean Cooper – Sound Design
- Eric Dawkins – Arranger, composer, Vocal Arrangement
- Antonio Dixon – Composer
- Bojan Dugich – Vocal Recording
- Euforo Ebong – Audio Production, composer, producer
- Allen L. Irvin III – Vocals
- James Fauntleroy – Arranger, composer, Vocal Arrangement
- Rick Friedrich – Audio Engineer
- Lanre Gaba – A&R
- Marvin Gaye – Composer
- Chris Gehringer – Mastering
- Larry Gold – Strings
- Victor Jason Greig – Executive Producer
- Kairi Guinn – Composer
- Carvin "Ransum" Haggins – Arranger, Audio Production, composer, engineer, producer, Vocal Arrangement
- Home Cookin' – Audio Production
- Adrian Hood – Vocals
- J.R. Hutson – Audio Production, Keyboards, producer, Programming
- Lee Hutson, Jr. – Composer
- Jaycen Joshua – Mixing
- John Lawson – Composer, Drums
- Buddy Jones – Composer
- Anika King – Art Manager
- Jason Kingsland – Assistant Engineer
- Jamie Knight – Vocals
- Labrats – Vocal Arrangement
- The Labratz – Arranger
- John Lawson – Composer, Drums
- Kevin Liles – Executive Producer
- Glen Marchese – Mixing
- Damian Marley – Composer, Featured Artist, Primary Artist
- Danny Miller – Art Direction, Design
- Wayne Moore – Bass Instrument, Bass
- Mark Morales – Composer
- PJ Morton – Arranger, composer, Vocal Arrangement
- Musiq Soulchild – Arranger, Audio Production, composer, Executive Producer, Mixing, Primary Artist, Vocal Arrangement, Vocals (Background)
- Renaldo Nehemiah – Stylist
- Kristal Oliver – Vocals
- Kristal "Tytewriter" Oliver – Guitar
- Dave Pensado – Mixing
- Miguel – Arranger, composer, Vocal Arrangement
- James Poyser – Audio Production, composer, Instrumentation, producer, Various Instruments
- Nick Romei – Package Manager
- Eric Rosseau – Engineer
- BJ Sledge – Composer
- John Smith – Guitar
- Johnnie "Smurf" Smith – Composer, Instrumentation, Keyboards
- John Stahl – Assistant Engineer, Audio Engineer, Mixing Assistant
- Michael Stanton – Composer
- Joi Starr – Composer
- Leonard Jr. Stephens – Composer, Guitar, Keyboards, Pedal Steel, Pedal Steel Guitar
- Tyrone Tellington – Composer
- Eric Tribbett – Drums
- Christopher Umana – Audio Production, composer, producer
- Joel Whitley – Guitar
- Corey Williams – Arranger, composer, Vocal Arrangement, Vocals
- Charlie Wilson – Composer
- Damon Wimbley – Composer
- Joy Winans – Spoken Word, Dialogue
- Peter Yang – Photography

== Charts ==
=== Weekly charts ===
Chart (2008)	Peak position
US Billboard 200	11
US Top R&B/Hip-Hop Albums (Billboard)	1

=== Year-end charts ===
Chart (2009)	Position
US Billboard 200	97
US Top R&B/Hip-Hop Albums (Billboard)	16
