= Block Wars =

Soundtrack album by the Game
- Released: July 29, 2016
- Recorded: 2016
- Genre: West Coast hip hop; gangsta rap
- Length: 31:58
- Label: Blood Money; eOne
- Producer: The Game; Stat Quo; Cash "Wack100" Jones; Bongo; GoodGuyDez; @officialkingBenny; Jelly Roll; Sap

The Game chronology
Streets of Compton (2016)	Block Wars (2016)	1992 (2016)

Block Wars is the second soundtrack album by American rapper the Game. It was released on July 29, 2016, by Blood Money Entertainment and Entertainment One Music. The album features a single guest appearance by singer Lorine Chia. Production was handled by numerous producers including frequent collaborator Bongo.

== Background ==
On May 24, 2016, Game took to his Instagram account to announce the release of his new mobile game with Atari titled "Block Wars". A soundtrack of the same name was developed by Game himself to feature in the app as well as coincide with the app's release. However, the mobile game was never released. It was to feature themes of gang violence and drug trafficking, which is also reflected within the content of the music itself. The soundtrack sold 5,000 copies in pure album sales in its first week of sales.

== Track listing ==
No.	Title	Producer(s)	Length
1.	"Block Wars"	Bongo	4:25
2.	"Freeway"	GoodGuyDez	3:26
3.	"Get High"	Jelly Roll	2:19
4.	"Alameda"	Sap	2:40
5.	"Gutter"	GoodGuyDez	2:11
6.	"Uzis and Grenades" (featuring Lorine Chia)	Bongo	2:57
7.	"Lights Go Out"	GoodGuyDez	2:29
8.	"Run It"	GoodGuyDez	2:24
9.	"Bullet with Your Name on It"	Sap	4:33
10.	"Murder"	GoodGuyDez	4:33
Total length:			31:58

== Charts ==
Chart (2016)	Peak position
US Independent Albums (Billboard)	33
US Top R&B/Hip-Hop Albums (Billboard)	22
