= Sinister (song) =

2021 single by Cordae featuring Lil Wayne

Single by Cordae

from the album From a Birds Eye View
- Released: December 3, 2021
- Recorded: 2021
- Genre: Hip-hop
- Length: 2:28
- Label: Atlantic; Art@War; Hi-Level
- Songwriters: Cordae Dunston; Dwayne Carter, Jr.; Chauncey Hollis; Rafael Brown
- Producers: Hit-Boy; Audio Anthem (co.)

Cordae singles chronology
"Super" (2021)	"Sinister" (2021)	"Chronicles" (2022)

Lil Wayne singles chronology
"Ya Dig" (2021)	"Sinister" (2021)	"Thought I Was Gonna Stop (Remix)" (2022)

Music video
- "Sinister" on YouTube

"Sinister" is a song by American rapper Cordae, released on December 3, 2021, as the second single from his second studio album From a Birds Eye View (2022). It features American rapper Lil Wayne and was produced by Hit-Boy, with co-production from Audio Anthem.

== Composition ==
In the chorus, Cordae raps about his plan of staying in the rap game for at least 20 years, and shouts out to Hit-Boy as well. Toward the end of the song, Lil Wayne raps his verse, using "dizzying wordplay".

== Critical reception ==
Jon Powell of Revolt wrote that the song sees Cordae "bringing some of his hardest bars to date". Wongo Okon of Uproxx commented that both rappers "strike fire for an impressive lyrical onslaught."

== Live performances ==
On January 11, 2022, Cordae performed the song on The Tonight Show Starring Jimmy Fallon along with "Chronicles".

== Music video ==
The music video was directed by Edgar Esteves, and references the Black Panther Party. In it, Cordae and Lil Wayne lead a "revolution" of bringing about the success of Cordae's own record label Hi-Level. Cordae plays the role of an activist, while Lil Wayne is a guest speaker. The two stand in front of a group of their followers as leaders.

== Charts ==
Chart performance for "Sinister"
Chart (2021)	Peak position
New Zealand Hot Singles (RMNZ)	40
