= Streets of Compton =

Soundtrack album by the Game
- Released: June 17, 2016
- Recorded: 2016
- Genre: West Coast hip hop; gangsta rap
- Length: 36:10
- Label: Blood Money; eOne Music
- Producer: The Game; Stat Quo; Cash "Wack100" Jones; Bongo; DeUno; DNYC3; Dupri; JellyRoll; League of Starz; Phonix; Tone Mason

The Game chronology
The Documentary 2.5 (2015)	Streets of Compton (2016)	Block Wars (2016)

Streets of Compton is the soundtrack by American rapper the Game. It was released on June 17, 2016, by Blood Money Entertainment and eOne Music. The album features guest appearances from Problem, Boogie, J3, AD, Micah, Payso, and AV. It also has production from League of Starz, DeUno, Tone Mason, Bongo, Phonix, and Jelly Roll. The album is supported by the lone single, "Roped Off".

== Background ==
Streets of Compton is a soundtrack album to support his show on A&E with the same name. It is a three-part documentary series that aired on June 9, 2016. The series feature interviews with several Compton residents and delve into Compton's recent past and attempt to explain how drugs, gangs, and political strife helped give birth to one Compton's rich musical and cultural history.

== Commercial performance ==
Streets of Compton debuted at number 25 on the US Billboard 200, with 20,000 equivalent album units; it sold 15,000 copies in its first week, and boasted over 3 million streams. As of July 24, 2016 Streets of Compton has sold over 25,000 copies in pure album sales not including streams.

== Critical reception ==
Professional ratings
Review scores
Source	Rating
Exclaim!	4/10

Exclaim!'s Rob Boffard gave the album a mixed to negative review, writing that it "feels a cynical attempt to benefit from the massive interest in Compton, a contractually obliged soundtrack album for an A&E documentary series of the same name."

== Track listing ==
No.	Title	Producer(s)	Length
1.	"Support Compton" (featuring J3 and Payso)	Phonix	4:09
2.	"Roped Off" (featuring Problem and Boogie)	DNYC3; Dupri; Jay Nari	3:35
3.	"Hit the News"	Jay Nari of League of Starz	2:26
4.	"Bullshit"	Jay Nari	3:00
5.	"Can't Wait"	DNYC3 of League of Starz	2:46
6.	"Gang Signs"	DeUno	4:01
7.	"Unfollow Me Bitch" (featuring Problem)	DeUno	2:40
8.	"The Chronic" (featuring AD and AV)	DeUno	3:25
9.	"Like Me"	Tone Mason	2:48
10.	"Death Row Chain"	Jelly Roll	3:35
11.	"For the Homies" (featuring Micah and Payso)	Bongo	3:44
Total length:			36:10

== Charts ==
Chart (2016)	Peak position
Australian Albums (ARIA)	72
Belgian Albums (Ultratop Flanders)	180
Canadian Albums (Billboard)	53
Swiss Albums (Schweizer Hitparade)	63
UK Albums (OCC)	176
US Billboard 200	25
US Independent Albums (Billboard)	2
US Top R&B/Hip-Hop Albums (Billboard)	4
