= The Lost Boy (album) =

Studio album by YBN Cordae
- Released: July 26, 2019
- Recorded: October 2018 – April 2019
- Genre: Hip-hop; neo soul
- Length: 45:19
- Label: Atlantic; Art@War
- Producer: Cordae (also exec.); BazeXX; SlimXX; BongoByTheWay; Cardiak; CoopTheTruth; Flippa; G Koop; Grandma; illuid.haller; J. Cole; Kid Culture; Maneesh; MixedbyAli; Bren “BrenOnTheBoards” Ferry; Nils; Rasool Diaz; Russ Chell; Slim; Smoko Ono; Take a Daytrip; Terrace Martin

YBN Cordae chronology
YBN: The Mixtape (2018)	The Lost Boy (2019)	Just Until... (2021)

Singles from The Lost Boy
- 1. "Have Mercy" Released: March 8, 2019; 2. "Bad Idea" Released: June 17, 2019; 3. "RNP" Released: July 23, 2019

The Lost Boy is the debut studio album by American rapper Cordae (then known as YBN Cordae). The album was released on July 26, 2019, by Atlantic Records and Art@War, and contains features from Chance the Rapper, Anderson .Paak, Ty Dolla Sign, Pusha T, Arin Ray, and Meek Mill. The album has received widespread acclaim from music critics. The album was later nominated for Best Rap Album at the 2020 Grammy Awards, while the album track "Bad Idea" was nominated a Grammy Award for Best Rap Song.

The Lost Boy was supported by three singles, "Have Mercy", "Bad Idea", and "RNP".

== Release and promotion ==
The album's lead single, "Have Mercy", was released on March 8, 2019. Two music videos for "Have Mercy" were released on April 16, 2019, with the first one being directed by Cole Bennett and the other being directed by Aplus. The single was produced by Flippa, Kid Culture, and Nils.

The album's second single, "Bad Idea", was released on June 17, 2019, along with an accompanied music video and features vocals from American rapper Chance the Rapper. The single was produced by Bongo ByTheWay with co-production by Kid Culture.

The album's third single, "RNP", was released on July 23, 2019, and features vocals from American singer Anderson .Paak. The single was produced by J. Cole. The music video was released on October 14.

The music video for "Broke as Fuck", was released on August 15, 2019.

== Critical reception ==
Professional ratings
Aggregate scores
Source	Rating
Metacritic	81/100
Review scores
Source	Rating
AllMusic	4/5 stars
Clash	8/10
Exclaim!	9/10
Highsnobiety	4.0/5
HipHopDX	3.8/5
Pitchfork	7.0/10
Tom Hull – on the Web	A−

The Lost Boy received widespread acclaim from critics. At Metacritic, which assigns a normalized rating out of 100 to reviews from mainstream publications, the album received an average score of 81, based on five reviews. Fred Thomas of AllMusic said, "The rapper's skills aren't in question on The Lost Boy, but the album sometimes overshoots in its ambition, aiming for too many styles to hit them all with excellence. It's still a strong collection, and when Cordae strikes a perfect balance of mellow production and lyrical power on standout tracks like "We Gon Make It," it points to even more fully formed work ahead from a strong talent just getting started." Nicolas Tyrell of Clash stated "Both bold and filled with bravado, yet layered and emotional, YBN Cordae is able to convey his desires, hopes, and fears in an ambitious and well-thought out format. A strong debut from an artist who knows that he is capable of long-term success."

Jacob Carey of Exclaim! said, "If The Lost Boy was the new wave rapper's most substantial test of talent and longevity, YBN Cordae passed with flying colours." Scott Glaysher of HipHopDX stated "Encapsulates everything a Gen Z rapper should be aiming for; young gun energy mixed with traditional skill." Will Schube of Pitchfork said, "Despite the glossy guestlist, The Lost Boy remains Cordae’s show. At 15 songs, it could have used an edit, another voice in the room telling him to tone it down. But still, it’s an assured debut." Tom Hull ranked it 52nd on his list of the best non-jazz albums from 2019.

== Commercial performance ==
The Lost Boy debuted at number 13 on the Billboard 200, with 25,000 copies moved in its first week for the chart dated August 10, 2019. The album also debuted on the Top R&B/Hip-Hop Albums chart at number eight.

== Track listing ==
Credits adapted from Tidal.

No.	Title	Writer(s)	Producer(s)	Length
1.	"Wintertime"	Cordae Dunston; Carl McCormick; Illuid Haller; Daniel Hackett; Terrace Martin; Jon Lucien	Cardiak; Kid Culture^{[a]}; Martin^{[a]}; illuid.haller^{[a]}	3:01
2.	"Have Mercy"	Dunston; Hackett; Ronald Colson; Nils Noehden	Flippa; Kid Culture; Nils	3:19
3.	"Sweet Lawd (Skit)"	Dunston; Haller; Hackett	illuid.haller; Kid Culture^{[a]}	1:09
4.	"Bad Idea" (featuring Chance the Rapper)	Dunston; Chancelor Bennett; Uforo Ebong; Hackett; Roberta Flack; Charles Mann; Donny Hathaway	BongoByTheWay; Kid Culture^{[a]}	3:54
5.	"Thanksgiving"	Dunston; Hackett; Cooper McGill; Karim Hutton	CoopTheTruth; Kid Culture	3:18
6.	"RNP" (featuring Anderson .Paak)	Dunston; Brandon Anderson; Jermaine Cole	J. Cole	2:56
7.	"Broke as Fuck"	Dunston; Hackett; David Biral; Denzel Baptiste; Russ Chell; Darian Garcia; McGill; Justin Zim; Jariuce Banks	Take a Daytrip; Russ Chell; CoopTheTruth; Kid Culture; Smoko Ono	3:16
8.	"Thousand Words"	Dunston; McCormick; Maneesh Bidaye; Martin	Cardiak; Martin^{[a]}	3:20
9.	"Way Back Home" (featuring Ty Dolla Sign)	Dunston; Tyrone Griffin, Jr.; Hackett; Robert Mandell	G Koop; Kid Culture; Mike Robbins	3:19
10.	"Grandma's House (Skit)"	Dunston; Janet Dunston	Grandma; YBN Cordae; illuid.haller	1:23
11.	"Been Around"	Dunston; Haller; Hackett	Kid Culture; illuid.haller	3:24
12.	"Nightmares Are Real" (featuring Pusha T)	Dunston; Terrence Thornton; Slim Allen; Stephen Basil; Haller; Hackett	Bazexx; Kid Culture; Slim; illuid.haller	2:47
13.	"Family Matters" (featuring Arin Ray)	Dunston; Arin Ray; Ebong; Thomas Brenneck; Homer Steinweiss; David Guy; Leon Michels; Ramon Velez	Bongo ByTheWay	3:31
14.	"We Gon Make It" (featuring Meek Mill)	Dunston; Robert Williams; Ebong; Hackett; Kenneth Gamble; Leon Huff	Bongo ByTheWay; Kid Culture	3:57
15.	"Lost & Found"	Dunston; Rasool Diaz; Bidaye	Maneesh; Rasool Diaz	2:41
Total length:				45:19

Notes

- ^{^[a]} signifies a co-producer
- "Wintertime" features vocals by Quincy Jones and additional vocals by PJ
- "Sweet Lawd (Skit)" and "Grandma's House (Skit)" features additional vocals by Arin Ray, Masego and SiR
- "Bad Idea" features additional vocals by Ant Clemons and SiR
- "Thanksgiving" features background vocals by SiR
- "Broke As Fuck" features background vocals by Jehreeus Banks
- "Thousand Words" features background vocals by Syd
- "Been Around" features background vocals by Hasani and vocals by Quincy Jones
- "Family Matters" features additional vocals by ThePpl

== Personnel ==
Credits adapted from Tidal.

Instrumentation

- Aliandro Prawl – keyboards (track 4)
- Amanda Bailey – strings (track 4)
- Tarron Crayton – bass (tracks 4, 13–14)
- Kid Culture – programming (track 4)
- Karim "Kace" Hutton – bass (track 5)
- Justin Zim – bass (track 7)
- Freaky Rob – guitar (track 9)
- illuid.haller – piano (track 10)
- G Koop – guitar (track 12)
- Raymond Komba – piano (track 13–14)

Technical

- Brendan "Bren" Ferry – recording (tracks 1–8, 10–15)
- Pedro Calloni – recording (track 2)
- Juro "Mez" Davis – recording (track 6)
- Take a Daytrip – recording (track 7)
- Cyrus "NOIS" Taghipour – mixing (tracks 1–2, 5, 7, 9, 12–15)
- Derek "MixedByAli" Ali – mixing (all tracks)
- Aria "Angel" Ali – mixing (tracks 2, 4, 6)
- Dave Kutch – mastering (all tracks)
- Zachary Acosta – engineering assistant (all tracks), mixing (tracks 2–3)
- Curtis "Sircut" Bye – engineering assistant (track 2)

== Charts ==
Chart (2019)	Peak position
Australian Albums (ARIA)	27
Belgian Albums (Ultratop Flanders)	105
Canadian Albums (Billboard)	12
Dutch Albums (Album Top 100)	25
Irish Albums (IRMA)	49
New Zealand Albums (RMNZ)	21
Swiss Albums (Schweizer Hitparade)	77
UK Albums (OCC)	85
US Billboard 200	13
US Top R&B/Hip-Hop Albums (Billboard)	8
