= All Eyez =

2016 single by The Game

Single by The Game featuring Jeremih

from the album 1992
- Released: June 20, 2016
- Recorded: 2016
- Genre: Pop-rap; R&B
- Length: 3:36
- Label: Blood Money; Fifth Amendment; eOne
- Songwriters: Jayceon Taylor; Jeremy Felton; Scott Storch
- Producers: Scott Storch; Diego Ave

The Game singles chronology
| "El Chapo" (2016) | "All Eyez" (2016) | "All the Way Up" (2016) |

Jeremih singles chronology
| "Pass Dat" (2016) | "All Eyez" (2016) | "Point Seen Money Gone" (2016) |

"All Eyez" is a song by American rapper The Game featuring Jeremih; it was released on June 20, 2016, by Blood Money Entertainment, Fifth Amendment and Entertainment One Music. It is the first single off of his album, 1992. The song is produced by Scott Storch and Diego Ave.

== Music video ==
On August 16, 2016, The Game uploaded the music video for "All Eyez" on his YouTube and Vevo account. The music video was directed by Benny Boom. The video stars The Game himself as well as Jamaican Canadian recording artist / model Kreesha Turner with appearances by Jeremih and Scott Storch.

== Track listing ==
- Digital download
1. "All Eyez" (featuring Jeremih) — 3:35

== Remix ==
On June 24, 2016, the official remix was released featuring a new verse from rapper Chronic on his SoundCloud account.

== Charts ==
=== Weekly charts ===
| Chart (2016) | Peak position |
|---|---|
| US Billboard Hot 100 | 79 |
| US Hot R&B/Hip-Hop Songs (Billboard) | 30 |
| US Rhythmic Airplay (Billboard) | 4 |

=== Year-end charts ===
| Chart (2016) | Position |
|---|---|
| US Rhythmic (Billboard) | 35 |

== Certifications ==
| Region | Certification | Certified units/sales |
|---|---|---|
| New Zealand (RMNZ) | Platinum | 30,000^{‡} |
| United States (RIAA) | Gold | 500,000^{‡} |
^{‡} Sales+streaming figures based on certification alone.

== Release history ==
| Region | Date | Format | Label | Ref. |
|---|---|---|---|---|
| United States | June 20, 2016 | Digital download | eOne | |
| United States | July 12, 2016 | Rhythmic contemporary | eOne | |
