= 1992 (album) =

Studio album by the Game
- Released: October 14, 2016
- Recorded: 2015–2016
- Genre: Hip hop
- Length: 53:13
- Labels: Blood Money; Fifth Amendment; eOne
- Producers: The Chemists Create; BongoByTheWay; Drumz & Rosez; WLPWR; Kidd Planet; BC; Cool & Dre; Invincible; JP Did This 1; Phonix Beats; Scott Storch; Terrace Martin

The Game chronology
Block Wars (2016)	1992 (2016)	Born 2 Rap (2019)

Singles from 1992
- 1. "All Eyez" Released: June 20, 2016

Professional ratings
Review scores
Source	Rating
AllMusic	3.5/5 stars
HipHopDX	4.1/5
Pop Magazine	3.5/5 stars
XXL	XL

1992 is the eighth studio album by American rapper the Game. It was released on October 14, 2016, by Blood Money Entertainment, Fifth Amendment Entertainment, and eOne Music. The album features two guest appearances by R&B singer Jeremih and by Jason Derulo, as well as uncredited appearances by Osbe Chill, Lorine Chia and Sonyae Elise.

== Background ==
Two months after releasing his previous double album The Documentary 2 and The Documentary 2.5 respectively, the Game took to Instagram to announce his next project entitled "1992". Without saying too much about the album, he did reveal the album will have no guest appearances and the project will be executive produced by Nigerian producer and frequent collaborator Bongo. The album's artwork was designed by Joe Cool, famed artist who is most famous for designing the cover of Snoop Dogg's famed album Doggystyle, along with Justin Roach.

== Recording and production ==
Explaining the album concept in an interview, the Game said it's based on his personal experiences growing up in Compton, California including the LA Riots, O. J. Simpson's murder trial and the Dream Team. Hip-hop artist Nas coached the Game in this aspect by speaking daily, listening to and sending back and forth tracks from the album. Long time collaborator and record producer Bongo is also described as having helped complete the album and providing production for the project. Talking about the album, Bongo describes it as having the approach of Golden age hip-hop in a way younger audiences can relate to and enjoy it.

== Release and promotion ==
On June 20, 2016, the lead single "All Eyez" produced by Scott Storch and featuring American singer Jeremih was released. The song was sent to rhythmic contemporary radio on July 12, 2016, and has since peaked at number 79 on US Billboard Hot 100 chart. The music video was shot in Malibu by director Benny Boom. The video stars the Game himself as well as Jamaican Canadian recording artist / model Kreesha Turner with appearances by Jeremih and Scott Storch. It premiered on August 16, 2016, on Vevo.

Upon completion of the album, the Game embarked on his 1992: Block Wars Tour in an effort to promote the album. The tour running from August 26, 2016, until October 6, 2016, involved an array of shows in various cities across the US. The European stretch of the tour is due to take place in the following winter. On September 15, 2016, the album became available to pre-order on iTunes. Along with this, the track list consisting of 13 songs was revealed and the song "True Colors / It's On" became available as an instant download with a pre-order. The song features production from Bongo and vocals from underground Los Angeles rap artist Osbe Chill.

A week later while performing at a Miami beach nightclub, the Game publicly threatened Philadelphia rapper Meek Mill on-stage. The following day, the song "92 Bars" premiered on Power 105.1. The song contained numerous lyrics aimed at Meek Mill including comments about Meek's relationship with Nicki Minaj and his feud with rap superstar Drake. This prompted Meek to respond to Game on a remix of Young M.A.'s song, "Ooouuu" with appearances by fellow rappers Omelly and Beanie Sigel. The song was released on September 18, 2016. Following this, the Game made his own remix of the same song titled "Pest Control". Taking shots not only at Meek, but affiliates Omelly, Beanie Sigel and Sean Kingston for their involvement in the beef, the song was released two days after Meek's remix on September 20, 2016. A music video for "Pest Control" was shot in Brooklyn and Baltimore. The video premiered on WorldStarHipHop on September 27, 2016.

"Baby You" became available as an instant download with a pre-order starting September 30, 2016. The song features vocals from American singer Jason Derulo, while production was handled by Miami-based production duo and long time collaborator Cool & Dre.

== Commercial performance ==
1992 debuted at number four on the US Billboard 200 with 32,000 album-equivalent units, which included 25,000 pure album sales, marking the second highest debut of the week and the second best-selling album of the week. It serves as the Game's ninth top-ten album in the United States. 1992 marking the Game's eighth number one-album on the Top R&B/Hip-Hop Albums chart, tie Tupac Shakur and Lil Wayne for the third most number-one, among Hip Hop acts on that chart. The album is the Game's sixth album to entry on the US Top R&B/Hip Hop Albums in 2016, more than any other act. The album also became the Game's eighth solo album in a row to top the Top Rap Albums chart, extending his record for the most number-one albums by a solo act in the chart. 1992 is the third album by Game to debut at number-one on the US Independent Albums in one year. In the United Kingdom, the album debuted at number 38 on the UK Albums Chart, it serves as the Game's ninth UK top 40 album. 1992 is Game's third number-one album on the UK R&B Chart.

== Track listing ==
No.	Title	Writer(s)	Producer(s)	Length
1.	"Savage Lifestyle"	Jayceon Taylor; Cory "LoKey" Martin; Invincible	The Chemists Create	4:51
2.	"True Colors / It's On"	Taylor; Uforo Ebong	Bongo	5:34
3.	"Bompton"	Taylor; Earl Johnson II	JP Did This 1	3:08
4.	"Fuck Orange Juice"	Taylor; Terrace Martin	Martin; The Game	1:43
5.	"The Juice"	Taylor; Lorine Bihchia; Martin; Watson; Jonathan Robinson	The Chemists Create; Drumz & Rosez	3:47
6.	"Young Niggas"	Taylor; Sonyae Elise; Martin; Invincible	The Chemists Create	4:08
7.	"The Soundtrack"	Taylor; Kenneth Joseph; Williams Robert Rihmeek	WLPWR	4:14
8.	"I Grew Up on Wu-Tang"	Taylor; Ebong	Bongo	2:55
9.	"However Do You Want It"	Taylor; Ebong	Bongo	4:52
10.	"Baby You" (featuring Jason Derulo)	Taylor; Jason Desrouleaux; Marcello Valenzano; Andre Lyon	Cool & Dre	5:04
11.	"What Your Life Like"	Taylor; Darius Barnes	Phonix	3:24
12.	"92 Bars"	Taylor; Tyler Coomes; A.Chenevert		5:58
13.	"All Eyez" (featuring Jeremih) (Bonus track)	Taylor; Valenzano; Lyon; Jeremih Felton; Scott Storch	Storch	3:35
Total length:				53:13

Notes

- "True Colors / It's On" features vocals from rapper Osbe Chill.
- "The Juice" and "The Soundtrack" features vocals from singer Lorine Chia.
- "Young Niggas" features vocals from singer Sonyae Elise.
- "Baby You" features vocals from singer Jason Derulo.

== Charts ==
=== Weekly charts ===
Chart (2016)	Peak position
Australian Albums (ARIA)	19
Belgian Albums (Ultratop Flanders)	83
Belgian Albums (Ultratop Wallonia)	164
Canadian Albums (Billboard)	14
Dutch Albums (Album Top 100)	99
German Albums (Offizielle Top 100)	91
Irish Albums (IRMA)	33
New Zealand Heatseeker Albums (RMNZ)	2
Scottish Albums (Official Charts)	43
Swiss Albums (Schweizer Hitparade)	45
UK Albums (Official Charts)	38
UK R&B Albums (Official Charts)	1
US Billboard 200	4
US Independent Albums (Billboard)	1
US Top Rap Albums (Billboard)	1
US Top R&B/Hip-Hop Albums (Billboard)	1

=== Year-end charts ===
Chart (2016)	Peak position
US Independent Albums (Billboard)	43
US Top R&B/Hip-Hop Albums (Billboard)	75

== See also ==
- 2016 in hip hop music
- List of UK R&B Albums Chart number ones of 2016
- List of Billboard number-one R&B/hip-hop albums of 2016
