= Ray Keys =

Nigerian-American songwriter and producer

Ray keys
- Born: Raymond Komba; 17 April 1990 (age 36); San Jose, California, United States
- Occupation: Music producer
- Known for: Tekashi 69 ZAZA

Raymond Komba (born 17 April 1990), professionally known as Ray Keys, is a Nigerian-American songwriter and producer. He is recognized for his work on Tekashi 6ix9ine’s song ZAZA released in 2021 and Gifted by Cordae, released in 2020.

== Early life and education ==
Keys was born on 17 April 1990 in San Jose, California. Keys, while growing up, was highly influenced by Pharrell Williams, Dr. Dre, and Ryan Leslie. He later learned to play piano, drums and guitar.

== Career ==
Keys, during his career, has partnered with several producers including Carter Lang, Kid culture, Swagg R’Celious, BongoByTheWay, RoccStarr, and others. Keys’ unique technique of combining his music talent and reaching out to the artists on a deeper level resulted in Keys composing numerous hit songs along with several artists such as Chris Brown, Fivio Foreign, Jack Harlow, Jeremih, Ty Dolla Sign, Dani Leigh, YBN Cordae, Teyana Taylor and Tekashi 6ix9ine.

Some of his works and collaborations include Tekashi 6ix9ine’s ZAZA, Cordae’s Gifted, Jason Derulo’s Let’s Shut Up & Dance, Dani Leigh’s Can’t Relate, and Takes Two.

== Discography ==
S.No.	Title	Album	Year
1	Adams Tale	Sweet to Get/ Adams Tale	2014
2	Sweet to Get	Sweet to Get/ Adams Tale	2014
3	Daylight	Daylight / Throughout	2014
4	Throughout	Daylight / Throughout	2014
5	Brown and Gold	Brown and Gold	2020
6	Lullabies	Brown and Gold	2020
7	Anybody	Brown and Gold	2020
8	Sweet Memories Pt. I	Brown and Gold	2020
9	Time’s a Wastin’	Brown and Gold	2020
10	Sweet Memories Pt. II	Brown and Gold	2020
11	Fool’s Gold	Brown and Gold	2020
12	Gifted	Gifted	2020
13	Harder Days	Harder Days	2021
14	ZAZA	ZAZA	2021
