= Radio (Musiq Soulchild song) =

Single by Musiq Soulchild

from the album OnMyRadio
- Released: August 5, 2008 (U.S.)
- Recorded: 2008
- Genre: Crunk
- Length: 3:22
- Label: Atlantic
- Songwriters: Soulchild, Castro, Ebong, Christopher Umana
- Producer: L&F

Musiq Soulchild singles chronology
"Makeyouhappy" (2007)	"Radio" (2008)	"IfULeave" (2008)

"Radio" is the first single from Musiq Soulchild's fifth studio album OnMyRadio, his second full-length release on Atlantic Records.

It charted at #55 on Billboard's Hot R&B/Hip-Hop Songs chart.

The video premiered August 13, 2008 on BET's Access Granted.

== Chart position ==
Chart (2008)	Peak position
U.S. Billboard Hot R&B/Hip-Hop Airplay	55
U.S. Billboard Hot R&B/Hip-Hop Songs	55
U.S. Billboard Mainstream R&B/Hip-Hop	36
