= Chronicles (song) =

2022 song by Cordae featuring H.E.R. and Lil Durk

Song by Cordae featuring H.E.R. and Lil Durk

from the album From a Birds Eye View
- Released: January 14, 2022
- Genre: Hip hop; R&B
- Length: 3:32
- Label: Atlantic; Art@War; Hi-Level
- Songwriters: Cordae Dunston; Gabriella Wilson; Durk Banks; Matthew Samuels; Miloš Angelov; Tahrence Brown; Anderson Hernandez
- Producers: Boi-1da; Don Mills; Audi; Vinylz

Music video
- "Chronicles" on YouTube

"Chronicles" is a song by American rapper and singer Cordae featuring fellow American singer H.E.R. and fellow American rapper and singer Lil Durk. Written alongside producers Boi-1da, Don Mills, Audi, and Vinylz, it is taken from the former's second studio album From a Birds Eye View (2022). The song features a guitar-laden instrumental, as well as crooning from Cordae.

== Critical reception ==
The song was well received by music critics. Chris Saunders of Clash wrote, "'Chronicles' gives us Cordae in a light we haven't seen before, attempting a more melodic, R&B inspired sound which surprisingly comes off fantastically well and is a standout moment on the album. Cordae's voice is filled with personality and confidence over the guitar sample laced throughout the track and he sounds completely at home while harmonising with an incredible vocalist in H.E.R on the chorus." Preezy Brown of Vibe described the song as the "real jewel" on From a Birds Eye View in terms of collaborations, also commenting that it "has the makings of a dark-horse hit that will surely get consistent spins on my personal playlist." NME's Kyann-Sian Williams called the song a highlight of the album. Uproxx's Aaron Williams regarded the song as a standout of the album that shows off Cordae's "star power", while David Blake of HipHopDX considered it one of the album's highest moments because of Cordae "breaking from the monotony and delivering the heartfelt feeling that is sorely lacking from this album." Robert Blair of HotNewHipHop wrote, "Alongside Lil Durk, 'Chronicles' with H.E.R sees him coax the global star out of her comfort zone to wondrous effect. While on Cordae's part, he finally unleashes those soothing vocal chops that had occasionally appeared on the peripheries of his output. With production overseen by Boi-1da, it's a track that feels predestined to be felt further afield and, with the proper promotion, could grant him the breakout commercial single that's proved elusive up until this point." Jayson Buford of Pitchfork stated, "The standout 'Chronicles' is an example of what Cordae could do if he took himself less seriously. The production hints at 2010s Jeremih, and H.E.R. turns in a great guest performance."

== Live performances ==
On January 11, 2022, Cordae performed the song on The Tonight Show Starring Jimmy Fallon along with "Sinister".

== Music video ==
A music video for the song premiered on January 19, 2022. It was directed by Aplus, Fredo Tovar, Scott Fleishman and Edwin Tovar. The video opens with Cordae heading to a diner at night, and sees the three artists performing the song atop the hood of a convertible in the parking lot, while each of them is also involved in a relationship of their own. Cordae works as a cook in the diner and becomes acquainted with a beautiful waitress, laughing and joking with her; H.E.R. is on a date at the diner with a man, whom she has "ups and downs" with; and Lil Durk hangs out in the parking lot, talking with his romantic interest, who rolls her eyes as he makes promises he cannot keep.

== Charts ==
Chart performance for "Chronicles"
| Chart (2022) | Peak position |
|---|---|
| New Zealand Hot Singles (RMNZ) | 14 |
| US Bubbling Under Hot 100 Singles (Billboard) | 7 |
| US Hot R&B/Hip-Hop Songs (Billboard) | 47 |

== Certifications ==
Certifications for "Chronicles"
| Region | Certification | Certified units/sales |
|---|---|---|
| United States (RIAA) | Gold | 500,000^{‡} |
^{‡} Sales+streaming figures based on certification alone.
