= Bad Idea (YBN Cordae song) =

2019 single by YBN Cordae

Single by YBN Cordae featuring Chance the Rapper

from the album The Lost Boy
- Released: June 17, 2019
- Genre: Hip-hop
- Length: 3:54
- Label: Atlantic; Art@War
- Songwriters: Cordae Dunston; Chancelor Bennett; Uforo Ebong; Daniel Hackett; Roberta Flack; Charles Mann; Donny Hathaway
- Producers: BongoByTheWay; Kid Culture (co.)

YBN Cordae singles chronology
"Have Mercy" (2019)	"Bad Idea" (2019)	"Racks" (2019)

Chance the Rapper singles chronology
"Cross Me" (2019)	"Bad Idea" (2019)	"True Kinda Love" (2019)

Music video
- "Bad Idea" on YouTube

"Bad Idea" is a song by American rapper Cordae, released on June 17, 2019 as the second single from his debut studio album The Lost Boy (2019). It features American rapper Chance the Rapper and was produced by BongoByTheWay, with co-production from Kid Culture. The song contains a sample of "Home Is Where the Hatred Is" by Gil Scott-Heron.

The song was nominated for the Grammy Award for Best Rap Song in 2020.

== Background and composition ==
Cordae premiered the song on Beats 1, during an interview with Zane Lowe in which he explained how the song came about. Cordae stated he met Chance the Rapper at Coachella, where they agreed to work on the song, and that he flew to Chicago to complete it. Moreover, he discussed the meaning behind the song:

The opening lines to the song is, "I know myself far too well to be a stranger of pain." I freestyled that line. That's like immediately what I thought of when I heard that beat. Meaning like, you know, "I know what I've been through. Everything that I've witnessed, everything that I've been to to[sic] act like I don't know myself." And that's really essentially what the song is about. It has like good home vibes, good summer vibes, like good nostalgic feeling to it. But like, not in a forceful way, cause I feel like now everybody's bringing back the nostalgic way, but in a force, you know what I'm saying? Like, it got to come natural. You know what I'm saying? This one feels real natural.

Lyrically, Cordae and Chance rap about the ups and downs of life, both ultimately deciding they are in a good state. The song also features additional vocals from singers Sir and Ant Clemons.

== Music video ==
The music video was released alongside the single. In it, Cordae reflects on his life after a long day of manual labor, and enjoys a family barbecue in the backyard with Chance the Rapper.

== Charts ==
Chart (2019)	Peak position
New Zealand Hot Singles (RMNZ)	22
