= Have Mercy (YBN Cordae song) =

2019 single by YBN Cordae

Single by YBN Cordae

from the album The Lost Boy
- Released: March 8, 2019
- Genre: Hip-hop
- Length: 3:09
- Label: Atlantic; Art@War
- Songwriters: Cordae Dunston; Daniel Hackett; Ronald Colson; Nils Noehden
- Producers: Flippa; Kid Culture; Nils

YBN Cordae singles chronology
"Locationships" (2019)	"Have Mercy" (2019)	"Bad Idea" (2019)

Music video
- "Have Mercy" on YouTube
- "Have Mercy (Path B)" on YouTube

"Have Mercy" is a song by American rapper YBN Cordae, released on March 8, 2019, as the second single from his debut studio album The Lost Boy (2019). It was produced by Flippa, Kid Culture, and Nils, and mixed and mastered by Mixed By Ali.

== Background ==
In an interview with Genius, YBN Cordae talked about the process of making the song:

I was in the studio all day, right? I be takin' naps in the studio, 'cause I be in that shit all day, so I took a nap at like 11. I take naps at the weirdest times, for real. I took a nap at like 11 and I woke up at like 3 AM, and then I wake up and my little bro, the cat who produced it, Kidd and Flip and then Brent my engineer. Kidd in there, playin' with the drums and Flip got the sample. And then Kidd start adding the drums and automatically it was just like, "Sweet Lord, please have mercy. Baby Jesus, please save us." I think I had a nightmare or some shit. You know what I'm sayin'? I just woke up like, "Sweet Lord …" And I was goin' through a bunch of shit around that time. Just the same shit everybody go through. 'Cause I feel like the world needs saving. Not just from like a religious standpoint, obviously. But just like, the world is fucked up, bro, like help! Nigga, please! You feel me? And we just all in the studio like, "Damn! That shit hard." I don't really think it was any like actual world events that I was thinking about at that current time. But I mean, some fucked up shit happens every fuckin' week. Every day, really, in the world. So, it's crazy.

== Composition ==
The song contains a synth hook and hi-hats in the production. Lyrically, YBN Cordae asks for mercy and forgiveness due to his sins.

== Music video ==
Two official music videos for the song were released on April 16, 2019. The first was directed by Cole Bennett and has a lighthearted theme; it finds YBN Cordae a prison jumpsuit, also featuring vivid colors, abstract imagery, "trippy effects", and large insects. The second was directed by Aplus and takes a dark approach; it finds Cordae exploring through a scary motel, witnessing crimes and violence along the way, while surrounding palm trees also catch fire. Cordae also gives a blank stare, showing his eyes as "demonic" fireballs.

== Charts ==
Chart (2019)	Peak position
New Zealand Hot Singles (RMNZ)	32

== Certifications ==
Region	Certification	Certified units/sales
United States (RIAA)	Gold	500,000^{‡}
^{‡} Sales+streaming figures based on certification alone.
