= SoBeautiful (song) =

Single by Musiq Soulchild

from the album OnMyRadio
- Released: January 20, 2009 (U.S.)
- Recorded: 2008
- Genre: R&B
- Length: 4:51
- Label: Atlantic
- Songwriters: JR Hutson, Musiq Soulchild
- Producer: JR Hutson

Musiq Soulchild singles chronology
"IfULeave" (2008)	"SoBeautiful" (2009)

"SoBeautiful" is the third single from Musiq Soulchild's fifth studio album, OnMyRadio. It was sent to US radio stations for airplay consideration in January 2009. It was nominated for a Grammy Award in the category of Best Male R&B Vocal Performance.

== Background ==
In an interview with HitQuarters, producer and co-writer JR Hutson described the genesis of the song,

"We’d done a couple of other ideas just off the cuff ... and then as he was leaving I started playing those four chords that are in the beginning of the song. He put his bag down and began commenting on what I was playing. I then started building the track, and he started writing the song - a couple of hours later we had the basic skeleton to the record."

== Charts ==
=== Weekly charts ===
Weekly chart performance for "SoBeautiful"
Chart (2009)	Peak position
US Billboard Hot 100	84
US Adult R&B Songs (Billboard)	2
US Hot R&B/Hip-Hop Songs (Billboard)	8

=== Year-end charts ===
Year-end chart performance for "SoBeautiful"
Chart (2009)	Position
US Hot R&B/Hip-Hop Songs (Billboard)	9
