= Grammy Award for Best Rap Song =

Award

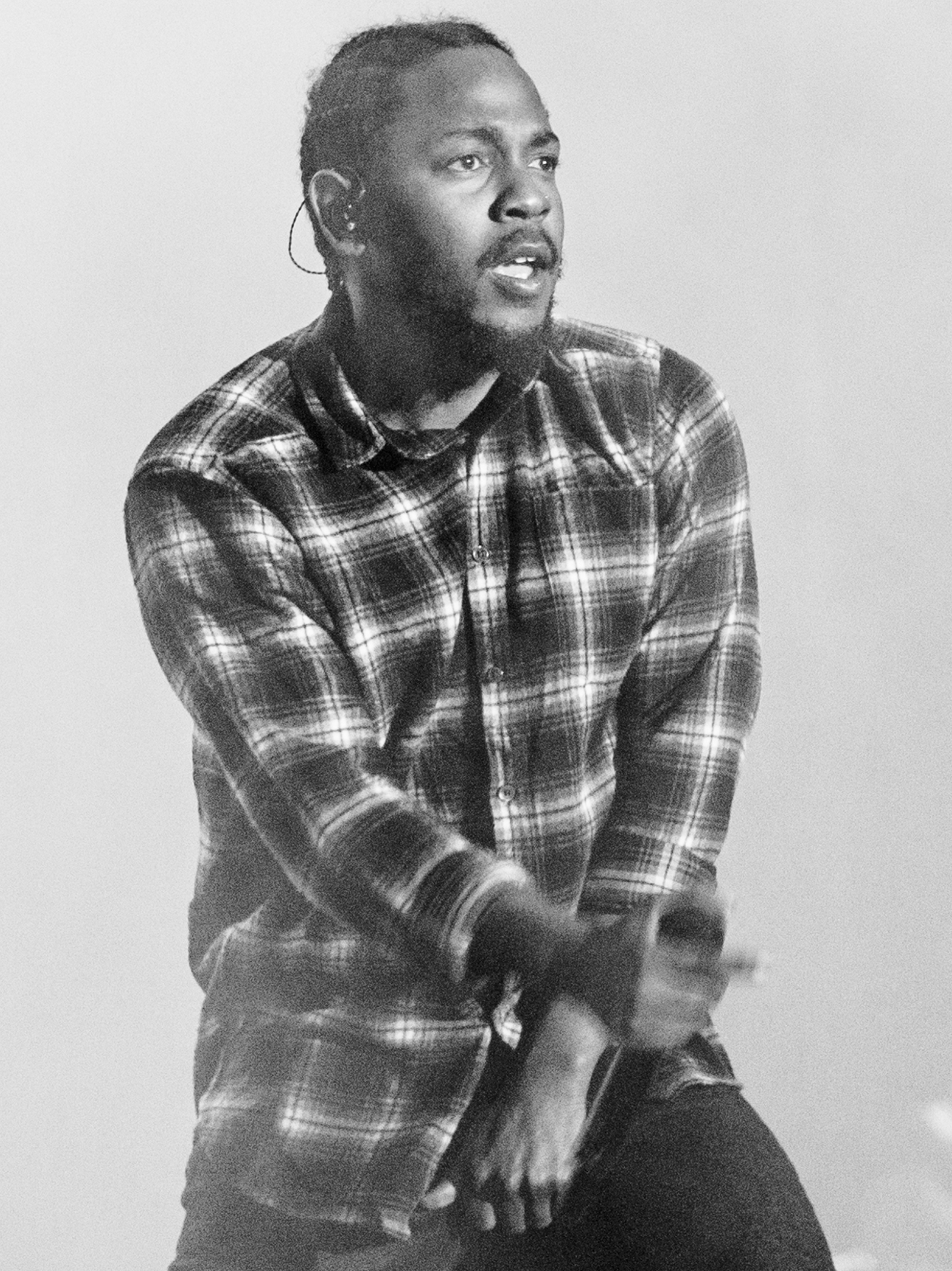
- "TV Off" by Kendrick Lamar (pictured) featuring Lefty Gunplay is the most recent recipient
- Awarded for: Quality rap songs
- Country: United States
- Presented by: National Academy of Recording Arts and Sciences
- First award: 2004
- Currently held by: Jack Antonoff, Larry Jayy, Kendrick Lamar, Dijon McFarlane, Sean Momberger, Mark Anthony Spears and Kamasi Washington for "TV Off" (Kendrick Lamar ft. Lefty Gunplay) (2026)
- Website: grammy.com

The Grammy Award for Best Rap Song is an honor presented at the Grammy Awards, a ceremony that was established in 1958 and originally called the Gramophone Awards, to recording artists for quality songs in the rap music genre. Honors in several categories are presented at the ceremony annually by the National Academy of Recording Arts and Sciences of the United States to "honor artistic achievement, technical proficiency and overall excellence in the recording industry, without regard to album sales or chart position".

The award was first presented to Eminem along with Jeff Bass and Luis Resto for the song "Lose Yourself" from the soundtrack 8 Mile in 2004. According to the 54th Grammy Awards description guide, the award honors the songwriter(s) of new songs (containing both music and lyrics) or songs "first achieving prominence during the period of eligibility". Songs containing prominent samples may be eligible. The award goes to the songwriter(s), not to the artist except when the artist is also a songwriter of the winning song. Songwriters who wrote the original samples, are not eligible for an award.

Kanye West holds the records for the most wins and nominations in this category, having won seven times out of sixteen nominations. Ye, Jay-Z, Pharrell Williams, Drake and Kendrick Lamar are the only songwriters to have won the category more than once. Cyhi the Prynce holds the record for most nominations without a win, with six.

== Recipients ==
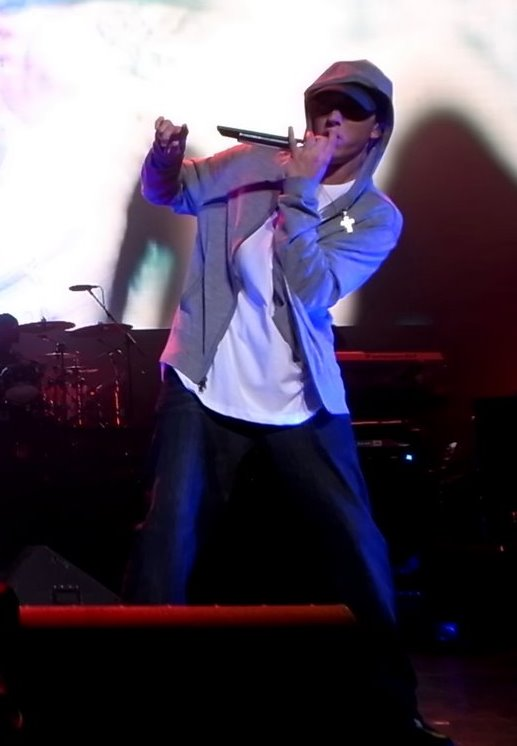
Eminem was the first recipient of the award in 2004 alongside Jeff Bass and Luis Resto.

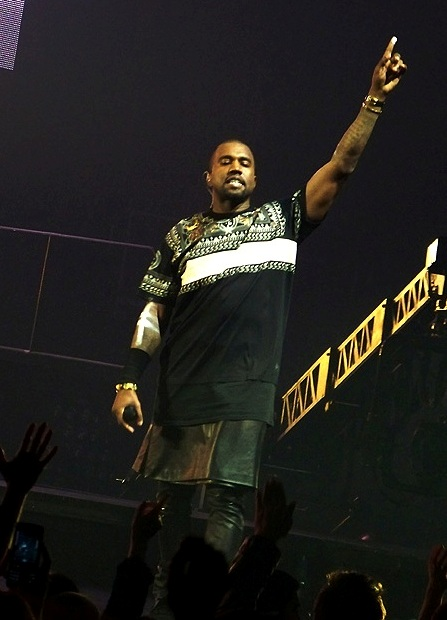
Kanye West holds the records of most wins in the category with seven, as well as most nominations for the award with sixteen.

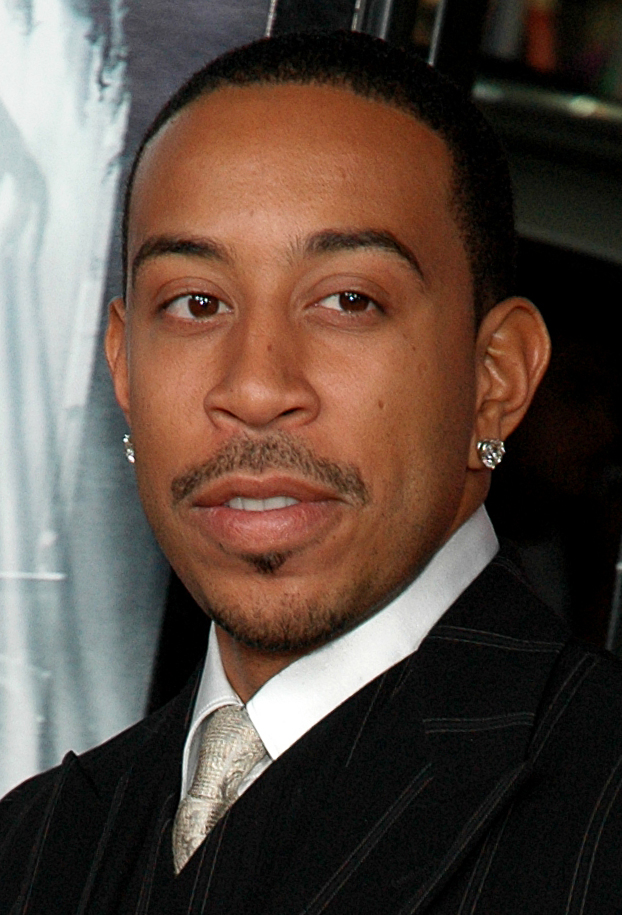
2007 winner Ludacris.

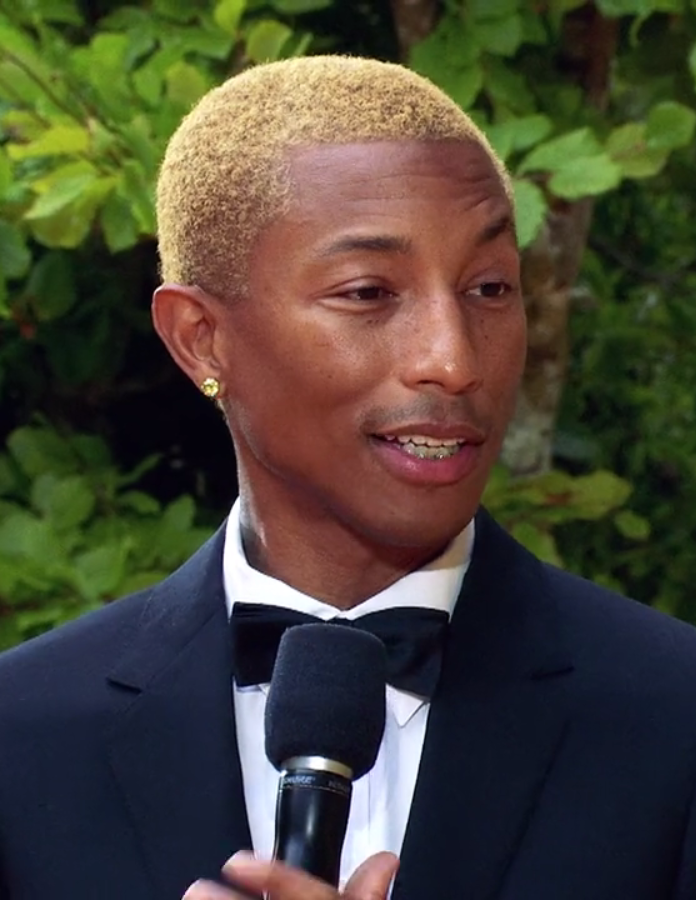
Two-time winner Pharrell Williams.

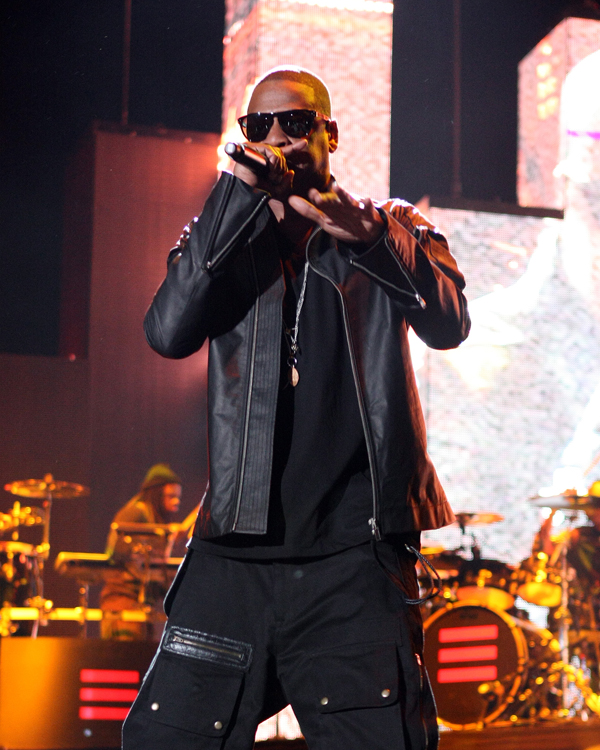
Four-time winner Jay-Z.

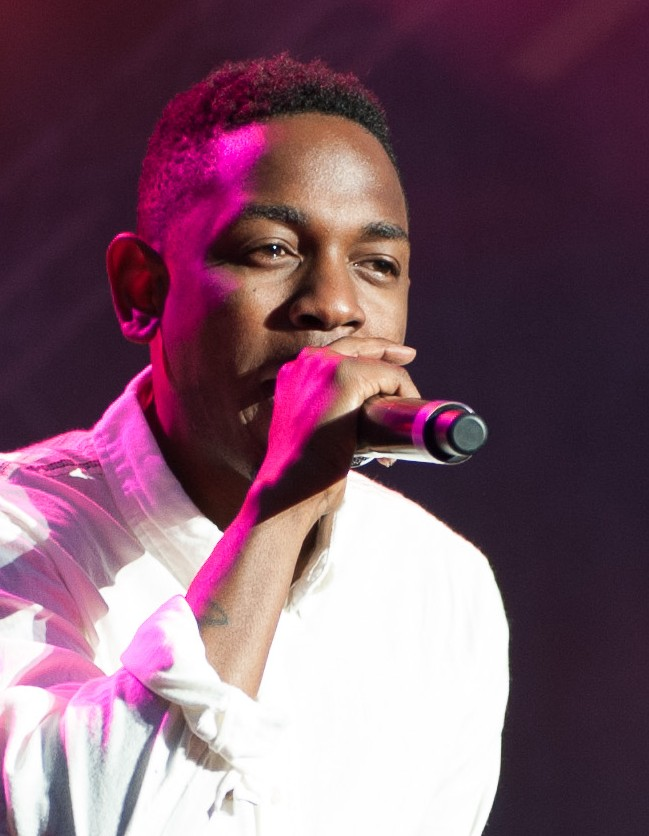
Six-time winner Kendrick Lamar.

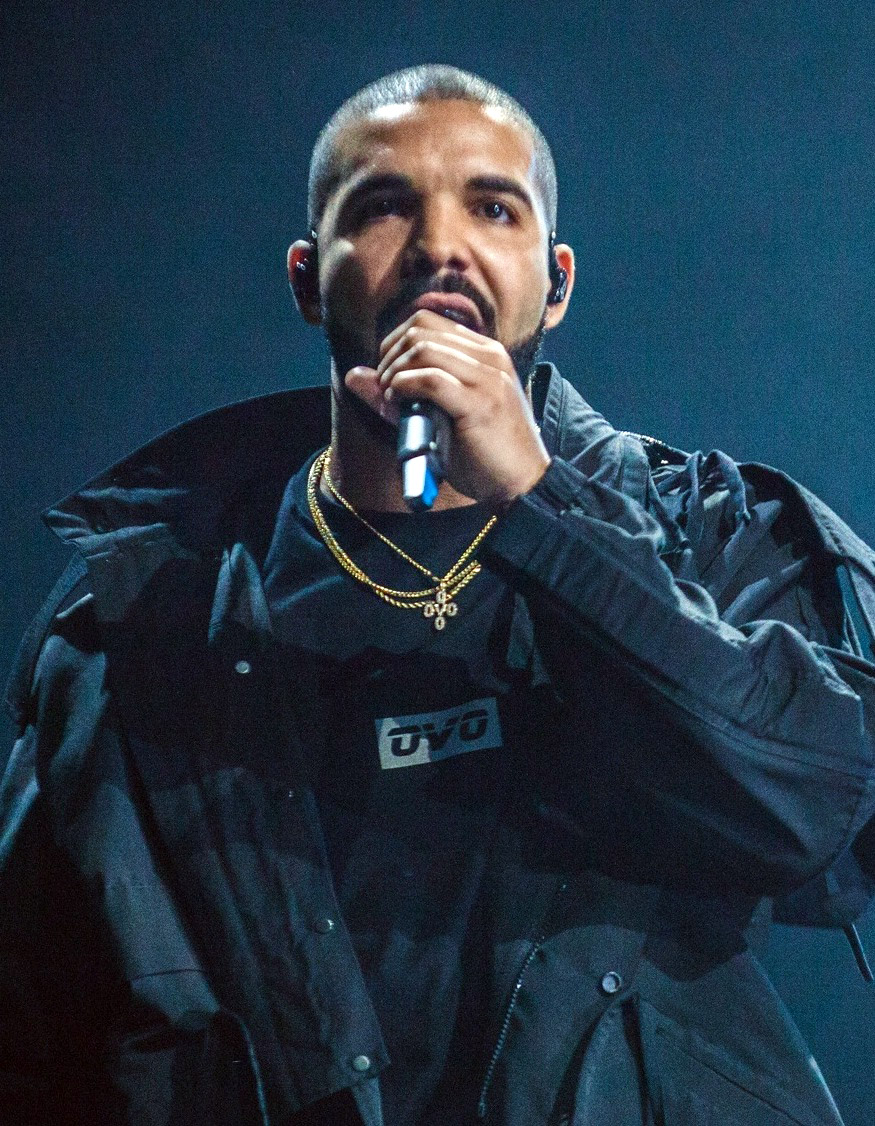
Two-time winner Drake.

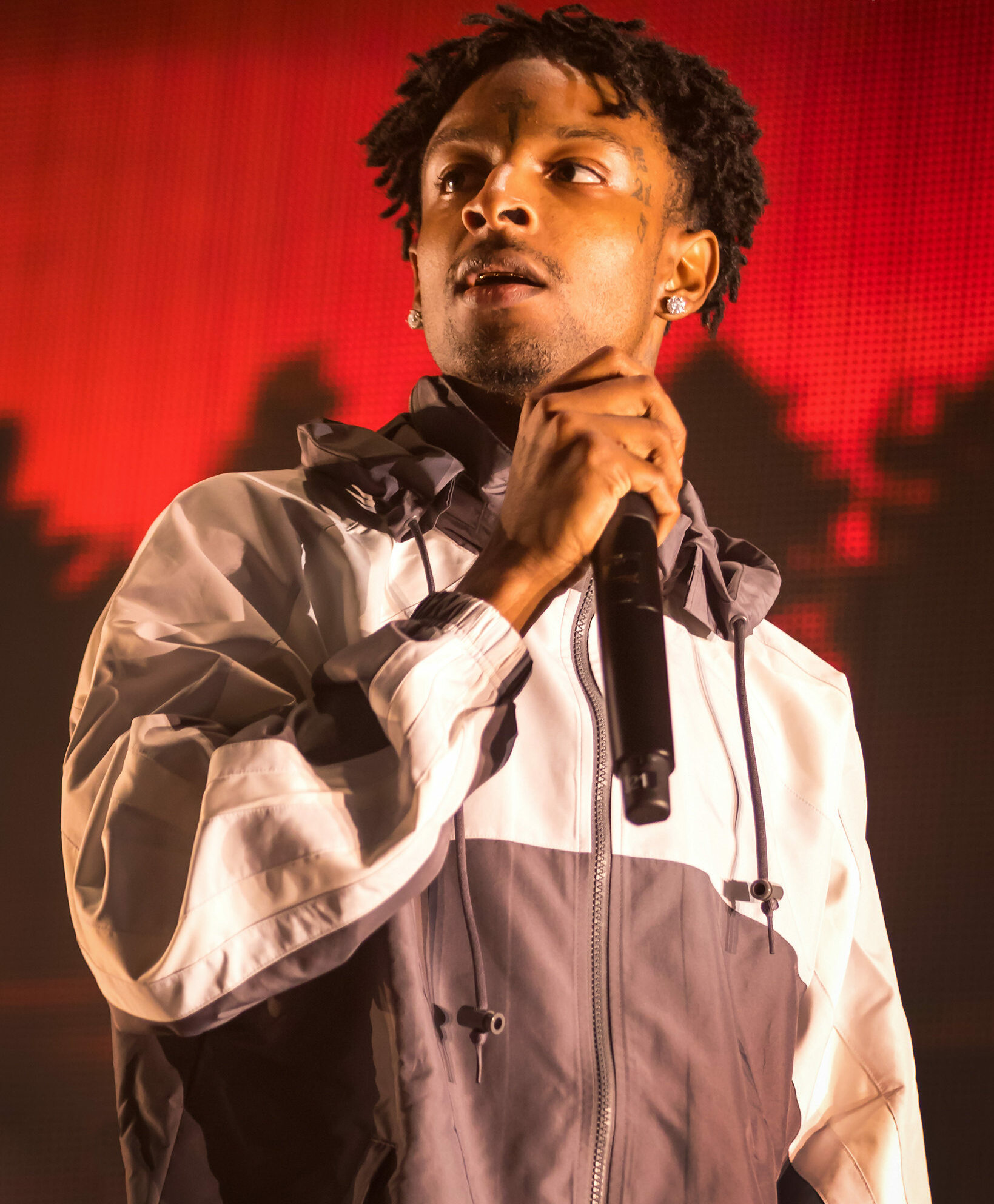
2020 winner 21 Savage.

=== 2000s ===
Year^{[I]}	Song	Songwriter(s)	Artist(s)
2004
2004	"Lose Yourself"	Jeff Bass, Marshall Mathers and Luis Resto	Eminem
2004	"Beautiful"	Calvin Broadus, Chad Hugo and Pharrell Williams	Snoop Dogg and Pharrell Williams
2004	"Excuse Me Miss"	Shawn Carter, Chad Hugo and Pharrell Williams	Jay-Z and Pharrell Williams
2004	"In da Club"	Mike Elizondo, Curtis Jackson and Andre Young	50 Cent
2004	"Work It"	Missy Elliott and Tim Mosley	Missy Elliott
2005
2005	"Jesus Walks"	Che Smith and Kanye West	Kanye West
2005	"Drop It Like It's Hot"	Calvin Broadus, Chad Hugo, Scott Thomas and Pharrell Williams	Snoop Dogg and Pharrell Williams
2005	"Hey Mama"	Will Adams and Anthony Henry	Black Eyed Peas
2005	"Let's Get It Started"	Will Adams, Mike Fratantuno, Jaime Gomez, George Pajon Jr., Allan Pineda and Terence Yoshiaki	Black Eyed Peas
2005	"99 Problems"	Shawn Carter and Rick Rubin	Jay-Z
2006
2006	"Diamonds from Sierra Leone"	Devo Harris and Kanye West	Kanye West
2006	"Candy Shop"	Curtis Jackson and Scott Storch	50 Cent featuring Olivia
2006	"Don't Phunk with My Heart"	William Adams, Printz Board, Stacy Ferguson and George Pajon Jr.	Black Eyed Peas
2006	"Hate It or Love It"	Curtis Jackson, Andre Lyon, Jayceon Taylor and Marcello Valenzano	The Game featuring 50 Cent
2006	"Lose Control"	Missy Elliott, Ciara Harris and Isaac Freeman III	Missy Elliott featuring Ciara and Fatman Scoop
2007
2007	"Money Maker"	Christopher Bridges and Pharrell Williams	Ludacris featuring Pharrell
2007	"It's Goin' Down"	Chadron Moore and Jasiel Robinson	Yung Joc
2007	"Kick, Push"	Wasalu Muhammad Jaco	Lupe Fiasco
2007	"Ridin'"	Anthony Henderson, Juan Salinas, Oscar Salinas and Hakeem Seriki	Chamillionaire featuring Krayzie Bone
2007	"What You Know"	Adrian Davis and Clifford Harris	T.I.
2008
2008	"Good Life"	Aldrin Davis, Faheem Najm and Kanye West	Kanye West featuring T-Pain
2008	"Ayo Technology"	Nate (Danja) Hills, Curtis Jackson, Timothy Mosley and Justin Timberlake	50 Cent featuring Justin Timberlake and Timbaland
2008	"Big Things Poppin' (Do It)"	Clifford Harris and Byron Thomas	T.I.
2008	"Can't Tell Me Nothing"	Aldrin Davis and Kanye West	Kanye West
2008	"Crank That"	Soulja Boy	Soulja Boy
2009
2009	"Lollipop"	Dwayne Carter, Stephen Garrett, Darius Harrison, Jim Jonsin and Rex Zamor	Lil Wayne featuring Static Major
2009	"Low"	Tramar Dillard, Montay Humphrey and T-Pain	Flo Rida featuring T-Pain
2009	"Sexual Eruption"	Calvin Broadus, Seneca Lovejoy and Demetrius Stewart	Snoop Dogg
2009	"Superstar"	Wasalu Muhammad Jaco and Soundtrakk	Lupe Fiasco featuring Matthew Santos
2009	"Swagga Like Us"	Mathangi Arulpragasam, Dwayne Carter, Shawn Carter, Clifford Harris, Topper Headon, Mick Jones, Wesley Pentz, Paul Simonon, Joe Strummer and Kanye West	T.I. featuring Jay-Z, Lil Wayne, Kanye West and M.I.A.

=== 2010s ===
Year^{[I]}	Song	Songwriter(s)	Artist(s)
2010
2010	"Run This Town"	Shawn Carter, Robyn Fenty, Makeba Riddick, Kanye West and Ernest Wilson	Jay-Z featuring Rihanna and Kanye West
2010	"Best I Ever Had"	Dwayne Carter, Aubrey Graham and Matthew Samuels	Drake
2010	"Day 'n' Nite"	Scott Mescudi and Oladipo Omishore	Kid Cudi
2010	"Dead and Gone"	Clifford Harris, Robin Tadross and Justin Timberlake	T.I. featuring Justin Timberlake
2010	"D.O.A. (Death of Auto-Tune)"	Shawn Carter and Ernest Wilson	Jay-Z
2011
2011	"Empire State of Mind"	Shawn Carter, Angela Hunte, Bert Keyes, Alicia Keys, Jane't "Jnay" Sewell-Ulepic and Alexander Shuckburgh	Jay-Z featuring Alicia Keys
2011	"Love the Way You Lie"	Alexander Grant, Skylar Grey and Marshall Mathers	Eminem featuring Rihanna
2011	"Not Afraid"	Matthew Burnett, Jordan Evans, Marshall Mathers, Luis Resto and Matthew Samuels	Eminem
2011	"Nothin' on You"	Philip Lawrence, Ari Levine, Bruno Mars and Bobby Simmons Jr.	B.o.B featuring Bruno Mars
2011	"On to the Next One"	Shawn Carter, Jessie Chaton and Kasseem Dean	Jay-Z and Swizz Beatz
2012
2012	"All of the Lights"	Jeff Bhasker, Malik Jones, Warren Trotter and Kanye West	Kanye West featuring Rihanna, Kid Cudi and Fergie
2012	"Black and Yellow"	Mikkel Eriksen, Tor Erik Hermansen and Cameron Thomaz	Wiz Khalifa
2012	"I Need a Doctor"	Andre Young, Alexander Grant, Skylar Grey and Marshall Mathers	Dr. Dre, Eminem and Skylar Grey
2012	"Look at Me Now"	Jean Baptiste, Chris Brown, Ryan Buendia, Trevor Smith, Dwayne Carter and Wesley Pentz	Chris Brown, Lil Wayne and Busta Rhymes
2012	"Otis"	Shawn Carter and Kanye West	Jay-Z and Kanye West
2012	"The Show Goes On"	Dustin William Brower, Jonathon Keith Brown, Daniel Johnson, Kane and Wasalu Muhammad Jaco	Lupe Fiasco
2013
2013	"Niggas in Paris"	Shawn Carter, Mike Dean, Chauncey Hollis and Kanye West	Jay-Z and Kanye West
2013	"Daughters"	Nasir Jones and Ernest Wilson	Nas
2013	"Lotus Flower Bomb"	Olubowale Akintimehin, S. Joseph Dew, Jerrin Howard, Walker Johnson and Miguel Jontel Pimentel	Wale featuring Miguel
2013	"Mercy"	Sean Anderson, Tauheed Epps, Stephan Taft, James Thomas, Terrence Thornton and Kanye West	Kanye West featuring Big Sean, Pusha T and 2 Chainz
2013	"The Motto"	Dwayne Carter, Aubrey Graham and Tyler Williams	Drake featuring Lil Wayne and Tyga
2013	"Young, Wild & Free"	Calvin Broadus, Chris Brody Brown, Philip Lawrence, Ari Levine, Peter Hernandez and Cameron Thomaz	Snoop Dogg and Wiz Khalifa featuring Bruno Mars
2014
2014	"Thrift Shop"	Ben Haggerty and Ryan Lewis	Macklemore & Ryan Lewis featuring Wanz
2014	"Fuckin' Problems"	Tauheed Epps, Aubrey Graham, Kendrick Lamar, Rakim Mayers and Noah Shebib	ASAP Rocky featuring Drake, 2 Chainz and Kendrick Lamar
2014	"Holy Grail"	Shawn Carter, Terius Nash, J. Harmon, Timothy Mosley, Justin Timberlake and Ernest Wilson	Jay-Z featuring Justin Timberlake
2014	"New Slaves"	Christopher Breaux, Ben Bronfman, Mike Dean, Louis Johnson, Malik Jones, Elon Rutberg, Sakiya Sandifer, Che Smith, Kanye West and Cydel Young	Kanye West
2014	"Started from the Bottom"	William Coleman, Aubrey Graham and Noah Shebib	Drake
2015
2015	"I"	Kendrick Duckworth, Columbus Smith and Ronald Isley	Kendrick Lamar
2015	"Anaconda"	Ernest Clark, Jamal Jones, Onika Maraj, Marcos Palacios and J. Solone Myvett	Nicki Minaj
2015	"Bound 2"	Mike Dean, Malik Jones, Che Pope, Elon Rutberg, Sakiya Sandifer, John Stephens, Kanye West, Charlie Wilson and Cydel Young	Kanye West featuring Charlie Wilson
2015	"We Dem Boyz"	Noel Fisher and Cameron Thomaz	Wiz Khalifa
2015	"0 to 100 / The Catch Up"	Adam Feeney, Aubrey Graham, Anderson Hernandez, Paul Jefferies, Matthew Samuels and Noah Shebib	Drake
2016
2016	"Alright"	Kendrick Duckworth, Kawan Prather, Mark Spears and Pharrell Williams	Kendrick Lamar
2016	"All Day"	Ernest Brown, Tyler Bryant, Sean Combs, Mike Dean, Rennard East, Noah Goldstein, Malik Yusef Jones, Karim Kharbouch, Allan Kyariga, Kendrick Lamar, Paul McCartney, Victor Mensah, Charles Njapa, Che Pope, Patrick Reynolds, Allen Ritter, Kanye West, Mario Winans and Cydel Young	Kanye West featuring Theophilus London, Allan Kingdom and Paul McCartney
2016	"Energy"	Richard Dorfmeister, Aubrey Graham, Markus Kienzl, Matthew O'Brien, M. Samuels and Phillip Thomas	Drake
2016	"Glory"	Lonnie Lynn, Che Smith and John Stephens	Common and John Legend
2016	"Trap Queen"	Tony Fadd and Willie J. Maxwell	Fetty Wap
2017
2017	"Hotline Bling"	Aubrey Graham and Paul Jefferies	Drake
2017	"All the Way Up"	Joseph Cartagena, Edward Davadi, Shandel Green, Karim Kharbouch, Andre Christopher Lyon, Reminisce Mackie and Marcello Valenzano	Fat Joe and Remy Ma featuring French Montana and Infared
2017	"Famous"	Chancellor Bennett, Ross Birchard, Ernest Brown, Andrew Dawson, Kasseem Dean, Mike Dean, Noah Goldstein, Kejuan Muchita, Patrick Reynolds, Kanye West and Cydel Young	Kanye West featuring Rihanna
2017	"No Problem"	Chancellor Bennett, Dwayne Carter and Tauheed Epps	Chance the Rapper featuring Lil Wayne and 2 Chainz
2017	"Ultralight Beam"	Chancellor Bennett, Kasseem Dean, Mike Dean, Kirk Franklin, Noah Goldstein, Samuel Griesemer, Terius Nash, Jerome Potter, Kelly Price, Nico "Donnie Trumpet" Segal, Derek Watkins, Kanye West and Cydel Young	Kanye West featuring Chance the Rapper, Kelly Price, Kirk Franklin and The-Dream
2018
2018	"Humble."	Kendrick Duckworth, Asheton Hogan and Michael Williams II	Kendrick Lamar
2018	"Bodak Yellow"	Dieuson Octave, Klenord Raphael, Shaftizm, Jordan Thorpe, Belcalis Almanzar and Anthony White	Cardi B
2018	"Chase Me"	Judah Bauer, Brian Burton, Hector Delgado, Jaime Meline, Antwan Patton, Michael Render, Russell Simins and Jon Spencer	Danger Mouse featuring Run the Jewels and Big Boi
2018	"Sassy"	Marlanna Evans and Eric Gabouer	Rapsody
2018	"The Story of O.J."	Shawn Carter and Dion Wilson	Jay-Z
2019
2019	"God's Plan"	Aubrey Graham, Ronald LaTour, Daveon Jackson, Brock Korsan, Matthew Samuels and Noah Shebib	Drake
2019	"King's Dead"	Kendrick Duckworth, Samuel Gloade, James Litherland, Johnny McKinzie, Mark Spears, Travis Walton, Nayvadius Wilburn and Michael Williams II	Kendrick Lamar, Jay Rock, Future and James Blake
2019	"Lucky You"	Ray Fraser, Gary Lucas, Marshall Mathers, Matthew Samuels and Jahaan Sweet	Eminem featuring Joyner Lucas
2019	"Sicko Mode"	Khalif Brown, Rogét Chahayed, BryTavious Chambers, Mike Dean, Mirsad Dervic, Kevin Gomringer, Tim Gomringer, Aubrey Graham, John Edward Hawkins, Chauncey Hollis, Jacques Webster, Ozan Yildirim and Cydel Young	Travis Scott featuring Drake, Big Hawk and Swae Lee
2019	"Win"	Kendrick Duckworth, Anderson Hernandez, Johnny McKinzie, Matthew Samuels and Corey Thompson	Jay Rock

=== 2020s ===
Year^{[I]}	Song	Songwriter(s)	Artist(s)
2020
2020	"A Lot"	Jermaine Cole, Dacoury Natche, 21 Savage and Anthony White	21 Savage featuring J. Cole
2020	"Bad Idea"	Chancelor Bennett, Cordae Dunston, Uforo Ebong and Daniel Hackett	YBN Cordae featuring Chance the Rapper
2020	"Gold Roses"	Noel Cadastre, Aubrey Graham, Anderson Hernandez, Khristopher Riddick-Tynes, William Leonard Roberts II, Joshua Quinton Scruggs, Leon Thomas III and Ozan Yildirim	Rick Ross featuring Drake
2020	"Racks in the Middle"	Ermias Asghedom, Dustin James Corbett, Greg Allen Davis, Chauncey Hollis, Jr. and Rodrick Moore	Nipsey Hussle featuring Roddy Ricch and Hit-Boy
2020	"Suge"	DaBaby, JetsonMade and Pooh Beatz	DaBaby
2021
2021	"Savage"	Beyoncé, Shawn Carter, Brittany Hazzard, Derrick Milano, Terius Nash, Megan Pete, Bobby Session Jr., Jordan Kyle Lanier Thorpe and Anthony White	Megan Thee Stallion featuring Beyoncé
2021	"The Bigger Picture"	Dominique Jones, Noah Pettigrew and Rai'shaun Williams	Lil Baby
2021	"The Box"	Samuel Gloade, Larrance Dopson, Rodrick Moore, Adarius Moragne, Eric Sloan and Khirye Anthony Tyler	Roddy Ricch
2021	"Laugh Now Cry Later"	Durk Banks, Rogét Chahayed, Aubrey Graham, Daveon Jackson, Ronald LaTour and Ryan Martinez	Drake featuring Lil Durk
2021	"ROCKSTAR"	Jonathan Lyndale Kirk, Ross Joseph Portaro IV and Rodrick Moore	DaBaby featuring Roddy Ricch
2022
2022	"Jail"	Dwayne Abernathy, Jr., Shawn Carter, Raul Cubina, Michael Dean, Charles M. Njapa, Sean Solymar, Kanye West and Mark Williams	Kanye West featuring Jay-Z
2022	"Bath Salts"	Shawn Carter, Kasseem Dean, Michael Forno, Nasir Jones and Earl Simmons	DMX featuring Jay-Z and Nas
2022	"Best Friend"	Amala Zandile Dlamini, Lukasz Gottwald, Randall Avery Hammers, Diamonté Harper, Asia Smith, Theron Thomas and Rocco Valdes	Saweetie featuring Amala Zandile Dlamini
2022	"Family Ties"	Roshwita Larisha Bacha, Hykeem Carter, Tobias Dekker, Colin Franken, Jasper Harris, Kendrick Lamar, Ronald Latour and Dominik Patrzek	Baby Keem featuring Kendrick Lamar
2022	"My Life"	Shéyaa Bin Abraham-Joseph, Jacob Dutton and Jermaine Cole	J. Cole featuring 21 Savage and Morray
2023
2023	"The Heart Part 5"	Jake Kosich, Johnny Kosich, Kendrick Lamar and Matt Schaeffer	Kendrick Lamar
2023	"Churchill Downs"	Alex Ernewein, Ryan Bakalarczyk, Matthew Samuels, Tahrence Brown, Rogét Chahayed and Aubrey Graham	Jack Harlow featuring Drake
2023	"God Did"	Tarik Azzouz, E. Blackmon, Khaled Khaled, F. LeBlanc, Shawn Carter, John Stephens, Dwayne Carter, William Roberts and Nicholas Warwar	DJ Khaled featuring Rick Ross, Lil Wayne, Shawn Carter, John Legend and Fridayy
2023	"Pushin P"	Lucas Depante, Nayvadius Wilburn, Sergio Kitchens, Wesley Tyler Glass and Jeffery Lamar Williams	Gunna and Future featuring Young Thug
2023	"Wait for U"	Tejiri Akpoghene, Floyd E. Bentley III, Jacob Canady, Isaac De Boni, Aubrey Graham, Israel Ayomide Fowobaje, Michael Mule, Oluwatoroti Oke and Temilade Openiyi	Future featuring Drake and Temilade Openiyi
2024
2024	"Scientists & Engineers"	Andre Benjamin, Paul Beauregard, James Blake, Michael Render, Tim Moore and Dion Wilson	Killer Mike featuring André 3000, Future and Eryn Allen Kane
2024	"Attention"	Rogét Chahayed, Amala Zandile Dlamini and Ari Starace	Doja Cat
2024	"Barbie World"	Isis Naija Gaston, Ephrem Louis Lopez Jr. and Onika Maraj	Nicki Minaj and Ice Spice featuring Aqua
2024	"Just Wanna Rock"	Mohamad Camara, Symere Woods and Javier Mercado	Lil Uzi Vert
2024	"Rich Flex"	Tay Keith, Isaac "Zac" De Boni, Aubrey Graham, J. Gwin, Anderson Hernandez, Michael "Finatik" Mule and Shéyaa Bin Abraham-Joseph	Drake and 21 Savage
2025
2025	"Not Like Us"	Kendrick Lamar	Kendrick Lamar
2025	"Asteroids"	Marlanna Evans	Rapsody featuring Hit-Boy
2025	"Carnival"	Jordan Carter, Raul Cubina, Grant Dickinson, Samuel Lindley, Nasir Pemberton, Dimitri Roger, Tyrone Griffin Jr., Kanye West and Mark Carl Stolinski Williams	¥$ (Kanye West and Ty Dolla Sign) featuring Rich the Kid and Playboi Carti
2025	"Like That"	Kendrick Lamar Duckworth, Kobe Hood, Leland Wayne and Nayvadius Wilburn	Future and Metro Boomin featuring Kendrick Lamar
2025	"Yeah Glo!"	Ronnie Jackson, Jaucquez Lowe, Timothy McKibbins, Kevin Andre Price, Julius Rivera III and Gloria Woods	GloRilla
2026
2026	"TV Off"	Jack Antonoff, Larry Jayy, Kendrick Lamar, Dijon McFarlane, Sean Momberger, Mark Anthony Spears and Kamasi Washington	Kendrick Lamar featuring Lefty Gunplay
2026	"Anxiety"	Jaylah Hickmon	Doechii
2026	"The Birds Don't Sing"	Gene Elliott Thornton Jr., Terrence Thornton, Pharrell Williams and Stevie Wonder	Clipse, Pusha T and Malice featuring John Legend and Voices of Fire
2026	"Sticky"	Aaron Bolton, Dudley Alexander Duverne, Gloria Woods, Dwayne Carter, Jr., Janae Wherry, Tyler Okonma and Rex Zamor	Tyler, the Creator featuring GloRilla, Sexyy Red and Lil Wayne
2026	"TGIF"	Lucas Alegria, Dillon Brophy, Yakki Davis, Jess Jackson, Ronnie Jackson, Mario Mims, Jorge M. Taveras and Gloria Woods	GloRilla
2027
2027	"E85"	Derek Anderson, Aaron Cheung, Jaasu Mallory, Caleb Toliver and Jacques Webster II	Don Toliver
2027	"ErrTime"	Matthew Allen, Javaan Anderson, Belcalis Almanzar, James Steed and Jorden Thorpe	Cardi B
2027	"Girl, Get Up"	Jahlil Gunter, Jaylah Hickmon, Solána Rowe, Darius Scott, Anthony "Moosa" Tiffith Jr. and Anthony "Top Dawg" Tiffith	Doechii featuring SZA
2027	"Let 'Em Know"	Clifford Harris and Pharrell Williams	T.I.
2027	"Spend Dat"	Caresha Romeka Brownlee, Akil King, Maurice Simmonds and Anthony Germaine White	Yung Miami

== Artists with multiple wins ==
7 wins

- Kanye West

6 wins

- Kendrick Lamar

4 wins

- Jay-Z

2 wins

- Pharrell Williams
- Drake

== Artists with multiple nominations ==
17 nominations

- Kanye West

14 nominations

- Jay-Z

13 nominations

- Drake

11 nominations

- Kendrick Lamar

7 nominations

- Lil Wayne
- Pharrell Williams

6 nominations

- T.I.

5 nominations

- Eminem

4 nominations

- Snoop Dogg
- 50 Cent
- Future

3 nominations

- 21 Savage
- 2 Chainz
- The Black Eyed Peas
- Chance the Rapper
- Lupe Fiasco
- GloRilla
- Wiz Khalifa
- Roddy Ricch
- Justin Timberlake

2 nominations

- Cardi B
- DaBaby
- Doechii
- Doja Cat
- Missy Elliott
- J. Cole
- Kid Cudi
- Hit-Boy
- Killer Mike
- John Legend
- Bruno Mars
- Nicki Minaj
- Nas
- Pusha T
- Rapsody
- Jay Rock
- Rick Ross
- Travis Scott
- T-Pain

== See also ==
- Grammy Award for Best Rap Performance
- Grammy Award for Best Rap Album
- List of Grammy Award categories
