= Gifted (song) =

2020 single by Cordae featuring Roddy Ricch

Single by Cordae featuring Roddy Ricch

from the album From a Birds Eye View
- Released: August 27, 2020
- Recorded: August 2019
- Length: 2:48
- Label: Atlantic; Art@War
- Songwriters: Cordae Dunston; Rodrick Moore, Jr.; Ant Clemons; Daniel Hackett; Tarron Crayton; Uforo Ebong; Raymond Komba
- Producers: Cordae; BongoBytheway; Ray Keys

Cordae singles chronology
"In These Streets" (2019)	"Gifted" (2020)	"Can't Put It in the Hands of Fate" (2020)

Roddy Ricch singles chronology
"The Woo" (2020)	"Gifted" (2020)	"Lemonade" (2020)

Music video
- "Gifted" on YouTube

"Gifted" is a song by American rapper Cordae featuring fellow American rapper Roddy Ricch. The song was released on August 27, 2020, marking Cordae's first release of 2020, and the first after dropping the "YBN" from his name. "Gifted" was released a day after Cordae's 23rd birthday, and features uncredited vocals from American singer Ant Clemons.

It was included as a bonus track on Cordae's second album From a Birds Eye View (2022). Regarding subject matter, the song sees the rappers reflect on their beginnings and eventual successes.

== Background and composition ==
In an interview with Zane Lowe for Apple Music, Cordae said the song was recorded one night in August 2019 after he and Ricch both performed at Real Street Festival. Cordae stated, "It was definitely a dope process making that record, for sure". Complex's Jordan Rose deemed "Gifted" somewhat of a coming-of-age song, with Cordae reminiscing on life before fame. The song finds the rappers talking about those who depend on them, harmonizing about their rags-to-riches come up over melodic production.

== Critical reception ==
Vulture's Zoe Haylock called the song a "Chance the Rapper–tinged bop" and complimented Cordae and Ricch for establishing themselves as "relatable but inspirational" on the track. Haylock further stated that "Cordae's skills as a chameleon shine". Jessica McKinney of Complex named it among the best new music of the week, noting how the duo trade reflective bars, but said "The best part of the track, though is the harmonizing between the two stars". Billboard's Carl Lamarre listed it as an essential release, and commended the rappers for embracing "their supreme talents", as they "carve a tuneful record for dreamers yearning for their big break". Marquin Stanley of KarenCivil.com said the song "certainly showcases Cordae's continued elevation as an artist and as a rapper that we all truly can relate to". Rap-Up called the track "inspirational". Alex Zidel of HotNewHipHop opined that Ant Clemons's vocal contributions complement the duo well.

== Music video ==
The music video was directed by Cole Bennett and premiered on his Lyrical Lemonade channel along with the song's release.
The visual reflects the lyrics, and sees Cordae go from driving a low-range car to living a grande life, complete with a mansion and a Rolls-Royce. The video closes with a quote from political activist Huey P. Newton: "The revolution has always been in the hands of the young. The young always inherit the revolution". The next frame references police brutality in the US, reading "Defund the police. Arrest and convict the killer cops", along with the names of Jacob Blake, Breonna Taylor, George Floyd, and Elijah McClain. Shortly prior to the song's release, Cordae showed support for the Black Lives Matter movement – he was arrested and charged with a felony while protesting Breonna Taylor's death by sitting on the lawn outside of Kentucky Attorney General Daniel Cameron's house with other protestors.

== Charts ==
Chart performance for "Gifted"
Chart (2020)	Peak position
Canada Hot 100 (Billboard)	84
New Zealand Hot Singles (RMNZ)	9
US Bubbling Under Hot 100 (Billboard)	1
US Hot R&B/Hip-Hop Songs (Billboard)	37
US Rhythmic Airplay (Billboard)	13
US Rolling Stone Top 100	73

== Certifications ==
Certifications for "Gifted"
Region	Certification	Certified units/sales
United States (RIAA)	Gold	500,000^{‡}
^{‡} Sales+streaming figures based on certification alone.
