= Cordae =

American rapper (born 1997)

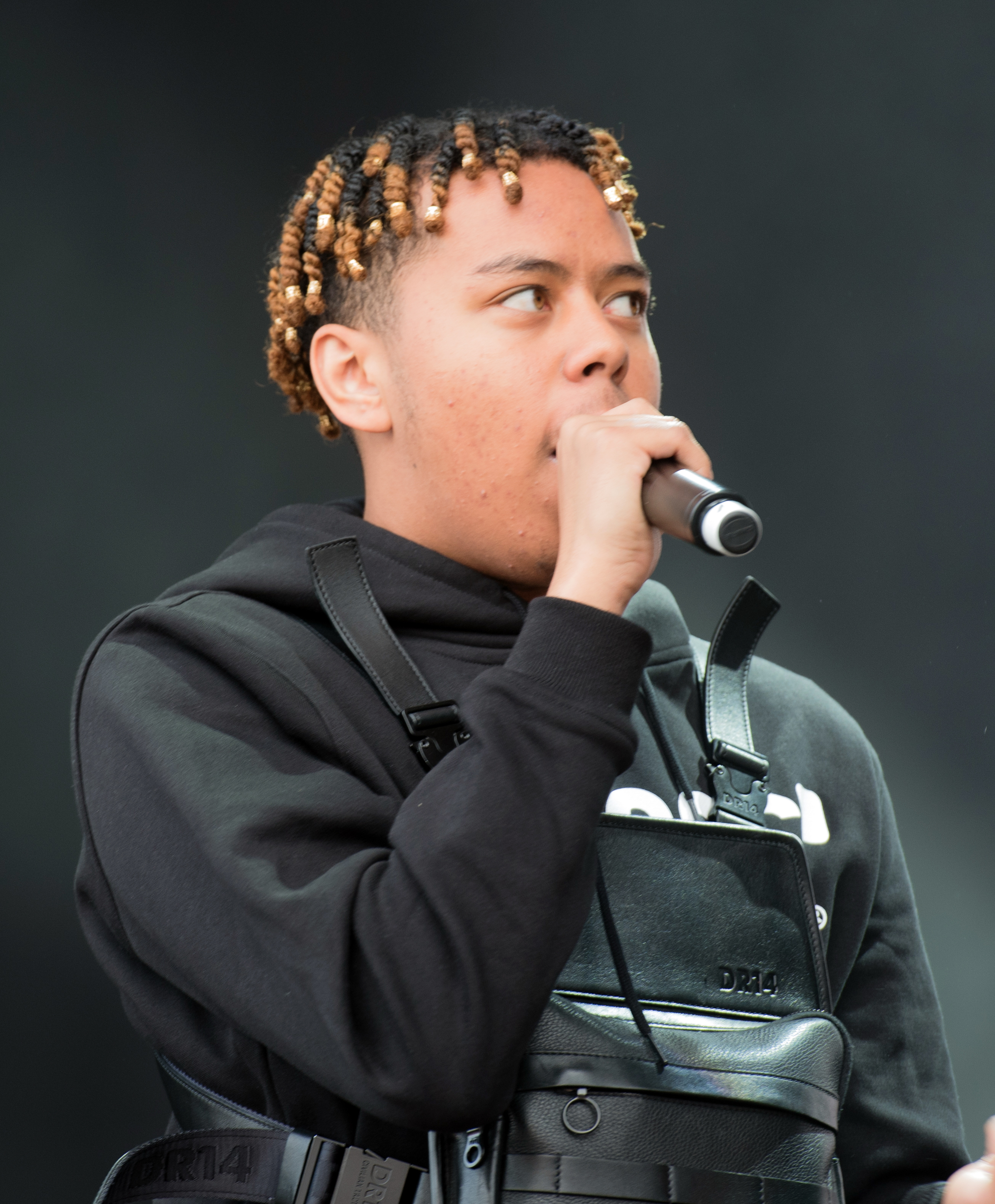
- Cordae performing at Openair Frauenfeld in 2019

Background information
- Also known as: Entendre; YBN Cordae
- Born: Cordae Amari Dunston; August 26, 1997 (age 29); Raleigh, North Carolina, U.S.
- Origin: Suitland, Maryland, U.S.
- Genres: Hip-hop; trap
- Occupations: Rapper; singer; songwriter
- Years active: 2014–present
- Labels: Atlantic; Art@War; Hi-Level
- Formerly of: YBN
- Partner: Naomi Osaka (2019–2025)

Cordae Amari West Brooks (né Dunston; born August 26, 1997), known mononymously as Cordae (formerly YBN Cordae and Entendre), is an American rapper. He began his career as a member of the hip-hop collective YBN.

His 2019 debut studio album, The Lost Boy, peaked at number 13 on the Billboard 200 and was met with critical acclaim. At the 62nd Grammy Awards, it was nominated for Best Rap Album, while its single, "Bad Idea" (featuring Chance the Rapper), was nominated for Best Rap Song. After the group disbanded in 2020, he dropped the "YBN" from his stage name. His second studio album, From a Birds Eye View (2022), matched the chart position of his previous, and was met with similar critical reception. Cordae released his third studio album, The Crossroads, in November 2024. It was a commercial failure but received positive critical reception.

== Early life ==
Brooks was born in Raleigh, North Carolina. He lived in nearby Zebulon, until he was 9 years old, when his family moved to Suitland, Maryland, where he was mostly raised. As a young child, he took an interest in music after his father played classic hip-hop artists such as Rakim, Nas, Big L, and Talib Kweli. He began writing raps around the age of fifteen. As he got older, he researched artists through YouTube, attempting to find music like his father played.

Brooks became more interested in pursuing a rap career as he grew older. He prioritized his studies, but often became distracted by writing lyrics. He graduated from high school in 2015 and decided to attend college at Towson University. He dropped out in 2018, explaining that college was "bigger than him" as a first-generation student, and he was mainly doing it for his mother. He moved to Los Angeles shortly afterward.

== Career ==
=== 2014–2019: Early beginnings, record deal, and The Lost Boy ===
He released three mixtapes as a teenager under the name Entendre: Anxiety (2014), I'm So Anxious (2016), and I'm So Anonymous (2017), which served as his first collaborative mixtape between Cordae and producer Anonymous.

Cordae began taking his rap career seriously in early 2018. When visiting Los Angeles, he hung around YBN Nahmir and YBN Almighty Jay, whom he'd met through social media. Nahmir had reached out to Cordae after hearing a song by Brooks, the only member of YBN who hadn't been introduced through video games. Cordae said he already felt like a part of YBN, and so changed from "Entendre" to "YBN Cordae". He also said that Entendre had been a name that he'd wanted to change for while: "I was just always around Nahmir and shit, those were just like my brothers... And, I was thinking, yo, I need to change my shit to like, Cordae, and shit, my actual first name. I was already "YBN" without the social tag".

In May 2018, Cordae released his first single, which he called his "introduction to the world": a remix of the 1999 song "My Name Is" by Eminem. He released the song along with a music video via WorldStarHipHop on YouTube. He then released "Old Niggas" as a response to "1985" by J. Cole, followed by the tracks "Fighting Temptations" and "Kung Fu".

In May 2018, Cordae made his debut live performance at the annual Rolling Loud music festival, where he performed with YBN Nahmir and YBN Almighty Jay. He performed with the duo again at the 2018 XXL Freshman Show in New York City, after Nahmir was announced as an inductee of the yearly freshman class. Brooks was then announced to be joining Juice Wrld on his North American WRLD Domination tour from May to September 2018, along with Lil Mosey and Blake, ended up reaching 28 cities.

Soon after, it was announced that the YBN collective would make a month-long tour in Europe. Brooks said he would release singles until his debut project was complete. On August 2, 2018, Nahmir and Cordae released a video for their single "Pain Away". On August 12, YBN Nahmir announced that an official YBN Mixtape featuring the trio would be released September 7, 2018. Cordae released the music video for his single, "Scotty Pippen", on August 23, 2018.

On January 28, 2019, Cordae released a music video for a new song, "Locationships", on his YouTube channel. In March, he released "Have Mercy", the lead single from his debut studio album, The Lost Boy. He was named as one of the members of XXL's "2019 Freshman Class" on June 20. Cordae released "Bad Idea" and "RNP" as the second and third singles from the album, and finally the album itself on July 26, 2019. The album landed YBN Cordae two nominations at the 62nd Grammy Awards: Best Rap Album and Best Rap Song for the single "Bad Idea". In November, YBN Cordae announced that he would be headlining "The Lost Boy in America Tour", which began in January 2020.

=== 2020–present: Disbanding of YBN, From a Birds Eye View, and The Crossroads ===
On August 6, 2020, YBN Nahmir announced on Twitter that the YBN collective had disbanded after a period of tension during which he and Cordae had stopped communicating. Cordae subsequently dropped the YBN from his stage name and asked YBN Nahmir for his blessing of the name change. On August 27, Cordae released a new single, "Gifted", featuring Roddy Ricch.

On April 22, 2021, Cordae released the EP Just Until..., featuring Q-Tip and Young Thug, in anticipation of his second studio album. On October 7, 2021, he released the single "Super".

Cordae released his second studio album, From a Birds Eye View, on January 14, 2022. The 14-song album features Eminem, Stevie Wonder, Gunna, and others.

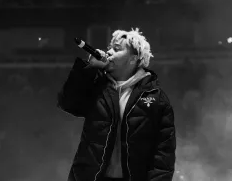
Cordae at the 2023 Lyrical Lemonade Summer Smash event

Cordae is featured by NF in the song "Careful", is the third song of the album Hope, released on April 7, 2023. This song reached the Billboard Hot 100 for a week and landed on position 85.

In July 2023, Cordae performed on the Lyrical Lemonade track "Doomsday" alongside the late rapper Juice Wrld; the song is the first single off the Lyrical Lemonade debut compilation album All Is Yellow (2024).

On November 15, 2024, Cordae released his third studio album, The Crossroads.

On August 19, 2026, Anderson .Paak and Cordae announced a full-length collaborative album entitled Heavy is the Crown. The album was released on October 23, 2026.

== Musical style and influences ==
Cordae lists Nas, Jay-Z, Kid Cudi, Kanye West, Eminem, Capital Steez, Lil Wayne, J. Cole, Big L, Travis Scott, and Kendrick Lamar as some of his biggest influences. Shortly after the release of The Lost Boy, he said his five favorite rappers were Jay-Z, Nas, 2Pac, The Notorious B.I.G., and Big L. He has called Nas' album It Was Written a big influence. He has repeatedly said that, given his musical background and understanding of old school hip-hop and what hip-hop is evolving into, he can be the key in bridging the generational gap in hip-hop.

Respect Magazine opined in 2018 on Brooks' trajectory as a rapper. "He is a mix of the old and new school, and the deliverance and perception of his music sets himself apart from the new generation of rappers these days. We get a clear glimpse of this in his music videos for "Old N*ggas," 'My Name Is,' and 'Kung Fu,' which all have over 5 million views on YouTube. He is building a solid buzz for himself day by day, and letting the world know his bars and rhymes are ahead of his time. He has yet to drop a project proving such."

Revolt TV said in 2018, "There's always going to be artists who go against the grain and manage to generate conversation without being mundane or routine. Cordae is the result of perfect timing, a need for change and managing to bridge the gap between aesthetic and talent. He's the Gohan of the YBN collective, appearing docile and juvenile but displaying a 'mastery' over words that seems at odds with old-school "hip-hoppers" belief about his age group. It is yet to be seen if his talent warrants the praise he's receiving."

== Personal life ==
Cordae has a tongue thrust. Before leaving college, he worked at a local T.G.I. Friday's in Maryland. He told Adam22 on the No Jumper podcast that he "hated" it and that he knew he was destined for more.

In July 2020, Brooks was arrested at a Breonna Taylor protest in Louisville, Kentucky, along with American professional football player Kenny Stills. He wore a defund the police t-shirt while watching the 2020 US Open women's singles final.

He began dating tennis star Naomi Osaka in 2019, whom he met at a Los Angeles Clippers game. On January 11, 2023, they announced that they were expecting their first child. On July 7, 2023, the couple welcomed a baby girl.

In September 2024, Cordae revealed via his Instagram story that he legally changed his last name from Dunston to Brooks.

On January 6, 2025, Naomi Osaka announced she and Cordae were no longer in a relationship. Osaka stated there was "no bad blood" between the two and that Cordae is "a great person and an awesome dad".

== Discography ==
=== Studio albums ===
Studio albums, with selected chart positions
Title	Album details	Peak chart positions							Certifications
Title	Album details	US	US R&B/HH	US Rap	AUS	CAN	NZ	UK	Certifications
The Lost Boy	Released: July 26, 2019; Label: Atlantic, Art@War; Formats: CD, LP, digital download, streaming	13	8	6	27	12	21	85	RMNZ: Gold
From a Birds Eye View	Released: January 14, 2022; Label: Atlantic, Art@War; Formats: CD, LP, digital download, streaming	13	7	4	44	18	28	100	
The Crossroads	Released: November 15, 2024; Label: Atlantic, Art@War; Formats: LP, digital download, streaming	143	—	—	—	—	—	—	
Heavy Is the Crown (with Anderson .Paak)	Released: October 23, 2026; Label: Apeshit + Empire, Hi Level + Mass Appeal; Formats: CD, LP, digital download, streaming	11	2	1	—	—	—	—	
"—" denotes a recording that did not chart or was not released in that territory.

=== Extended plays ===
Extended plays, with selected chart positions
Title	EP details
Just Until...	Released: April 22, 2021; Label: Atlantic; Formats: Digital download, streaming

=== Mixtapes ===
List of mixtapes, with selected chart positions and details
Title	Details	Peak chart positions				Certifications
Title	Details	US	US R&B/HH	US Rap	CAN	Certifications
Anxiety (as Entendre)	Released: June 22, 2014; Label: Self-released; Format: Digital download	—	—	—	—	
I'm So Anxious (as Entendre)	Released: August 7, 2016; Label: Self-released; Format: Digital download	—	—	—	—	
I'm So Anonymous (with Anonymous, as Entendre)	Released: August 15, 2017; Label: Self-released; Format: Digital download	—	—	—	—	
YBN: The Mixtape (as YBN Cordae with YBN Almighty Jay and YBN Nahmir)	Released: September 7, 2018; Label: Atlantic, Art@War; Formats: Digital download	21	13	12	19	RIAA: Gold; MC: Gold
"—" denotes a recording that did not chart or was not released in that territory.

=== Singles ===
==== As lead artist ====
Title	Year	Peak chart positions					Certification	Album
Title	Year	US	US R&B/HH	CAN	IRE	NZ Hot	Certification	Album
"My Name Is"	2018	—	—	—	—	—		Non-album singles
"Old Niggas"	2018	—	—	—	—	—		Non-album singles
"Fighting Temptations"	2018	—	—	—	—	—		Non-album singles
"Kung Fu"	2018	—	—	—	—	—	RIAA: Gold; MC: Gold; RMNZ: Gold	YBN: The Mixtape
"Alaska (Scotty Pippen)"	2018	—	—	—	—	—		YBN: The Mixtape
"What's Life"	2018	—	—	—	—	—		Non-album singles
"Locationships"	2019	—	—	—	—	—		Non-album singles
"Have Mercy"	2019	—	—	—	—	32	RIAA: Gold	The Lost Boy
"Bad Idea" (featuring Chance the Rapper)	2019	—	—	—	—	22		The Lost Boy
"RNP" (featuring Anderson .Paak)	2019	— (Note: "RNP" did not enter the Billboard Hot 100, but peaked at number 15 on the Bubbling Under Hot 100 chart.)	— (Note: "RNP" did not enter the Billboard Hot R&B/Hip-Hop Songs, but peaked at number three on the Billboard Bubbling Under Hot R&B/Hip-Hop Singles chart.)	84	92	4	RIAA: Gold; MC: Gold; RMNZ: 2× Platinum	The Lost Boy
"Gifted" (featuring Roddy Ricch)	2020	— (Note: "Gifted" did not enter the Billboard Hot 100, but peaked at number one on the Bubbling Under Hot 100 chart.)	37	84	—	9	RIAA: Gold	From a Birds Eye View
"The Parables"	2020	—	—	—	—	—		Non-album singles
"Taxes"	2021	—	—	—	—	—		Non-album singles
"Killer (Remix)" (with Eminem and Jack Harlow)	2021	62	—	37	64	2	RIAA: Platinum; ARIA: Gold	Non-album singles
"Super"	2021	— (Note: "Super" did not enter the Billboard Hot 100, but peaked at number 23 on the Bubbling Under Hot 100 chart.)	—	—	—	27	RIAA: Gold; MC: Gold	From a Birds Eye View
"Sinister" (featuring Lil Wayne)	2021	—	—	—	—	40		From a Birds Eye View
"Unacceptable" / "So with That"	2022	—	—	—	—	—		Non-album singles
"Checkmate" (with Hit-Boy)	2022	—	—	—	—	—		Non-album singles
"Two Tens" (featuring Anderson .Paak)	2023	— (Note: "Two Tens" did not enter the Billboard Hot 100, but peaked at number 25 on the Bubbling Under Hot 100 chart.)	—	74	—	8		The Crossroads
"Curious" (with Eric Bellinger and Fabolous)	2023	—	—	—	—	—		1-800-Hit Eazy: Line 2
"Doomsday" (with Lyrical Lemonade and Juice Wrld)	2023	58	19	49	83	3	RIAA: Gold	All Is Yellow
"Saturday Mornings" (featuring Lil Wayne)	2024	—	41	—	—	37		The Crossroads
"Summer Drop" (featuring Anderson .Paak)	2024	—	—	—	—	27		The Crossroads
"No Bad News" (featuring Kanye West)	2024	—	—	—	—	37		The Crossroads
"A Good Day" (with Anderson .Paak)	2026	—	38	—	—	—		Heavy Is the Crown
"—" denotes a recording that did not chart or was not released in that territory.

==== As featured artist ====
List of singles as a featured artist, showing year released and album name
Title	Year	Peak chart positions	Album
Title	Year	US	Album
"Blackjack (Remix)" (Aminé featuring Cordae)	2019	—	Non-album single
"Racks" (H.E.R. featuring Cordae)	2019	—	I Used to Know Her
"In These Streets" (Godfather of Harlem featuring John Legend, Cordae, and Nick Grant)	2019	—	Non-album single
"Can't Put It in the Hands of Fate" (Stevie Wonder featuring Rapsody, Cordae, Chika, and Busta Rhymes)	2020	—	TBA
"Soda" (DJ Scheme featuring Cordae, Ski Mask the Slump God, and Take a Daytrip)	2020	—	Family
"Life Is Like a Dice Game" (Nas featuring Freddie Gibbs and Cordae)	2021	—	Non-album single
"Spinnin" (Dougie B featuring B-Lovee and Cordae)	2022	—	Nobody Bigger
"Flame On" (Aitch featuring Cordae)	2023	—	Lost Files
"—" denotes a recording that did not chart or was not released in that territory.

=== Other charted songs ===
List of songs, with selected chart positions, showing year released and album name
Title	Year	Peak chart positions			Certifications	Album
Title	Year	US	US R&B/HH	NZ Hot	Certifications	Album
"Mama / Show Love" (Logic featuring Cordae)	2019	—	— (Note: "Mama / Show Love" did not enter the Hot R&B/Hip-Hop Songs chart, but peaked at number six on the Bubbling Under R&B/Hip-Hop Singles chart.)	18		Confessions of a Dangerous Mind
"Broke as Fuck"	2019	—	—	22	RIAA: Gold	The Lost Boy
"Dream in Color"	2021	—	—	20		Just Until...
"Wassup" (featuring Young Thug)	2021	—	—	37		Just Until...
"Today" (featuring Gunna)	2022	— (Note: "Today" did not enter the Billboard Hot 100, but peaked at number 11 on the Bubbling Under Hot 100 chart.)	—	28		From a Birds Eye View
"Chronicles" (featuring H.E.R. and Lil Durk)	2022	— (Note: "Chronicles" did not enter the Billboard Hot 100, but peaked at number seven on the Bubbling Under Hot 100 chart.)	47	14	RIAA: Gold	From a Birds Eye View
"Parables (Remix)" (featuring Eminem)	2022	—	—	31		From a Birds Eye View
"Careful" (NF featuring Cordae)	2023	85	29	10		Hope
"Airbender" (with Anderson .Paak)	2026	— (Note: "Airbender" did not enter the Billboard Hot 100, but peaked at number 15 on the Bubbling Under Hot 100 chart.)	28	—		Heavy Is the Crown
"—" denotes a recording that did not chart or was not released in that territory.

=== Guest appearances ===
List of non-single guest appearances, with other performing artists, showing year released and album name
Title	Year	Other artist(s)	Album
"Starving Artist"	2018	[602] Prophet	Abstract Nostalgia
"Make Me Feel"	2018	YBN Almighty Jay	YBN: The Mixtape
"Pain Away"	2018	YBN Nahmir	YBN: The Mixtape
"Tout ce que je sais"	2018	Orelsan	La fête est finie – Épilogue
"Multiply"	2018	Problem, Mozzy	S2
"Elevate"	2018	DJ Khalil, Denzel Curry, SwaVay, Trevor Rich	Spider-Man: Into the Spider-Verse
"Mama / Show Love"	2019	Logic	Confessions of a Dangerous Mind
"Nothin' Less"	2019	Curren$y, Statik Selektah	Gran Turismo
"Let Me Down"	2019	NBDY	Admissions
"Lord Is Coming"	2019	H.E.R.	I Used to Know Her
"Gone"	2019	Robert Glasper, Bilal, Herbie Hancock	Fuck Yo Feelings
"Sunshine"	2019	Robert Glasper	Fuck Yo Feelings
"Al1enZ"	2019	Denzel Curry	iFruit Radio (Soundtrack)
"What's Life"	2021	Common	Liberated / Music For the Movement Vol. 3
"Settle the Score"	2021	Duckwrth	Space Jam: A New Legacy (Original Motion Picture Soundtrack)
"Work It Out"	2021	Terrace Martin	Drones
"Only Fan"	2022	Bazzi	Infinite Dream
"Careful"	2023	NF	Hope
"Beetleborgs"	2023	BabyTron	Bin Reaper 3
"Lost My Trust"	2023	Lil Keed,	Keed Talk to Em 2
"Tried and Tried Again"	2023	Tee Grizzley	Tee's Coney Island
"long Way"	2023	Dave East	Fortune Favors the Bold
"Suicide Doors"	2024	Juicy J	Ravenite Social Club
"So Superb"	2024	Slum Village	F.U.N.
