= John Kwatakye-Atiko =

American music executive

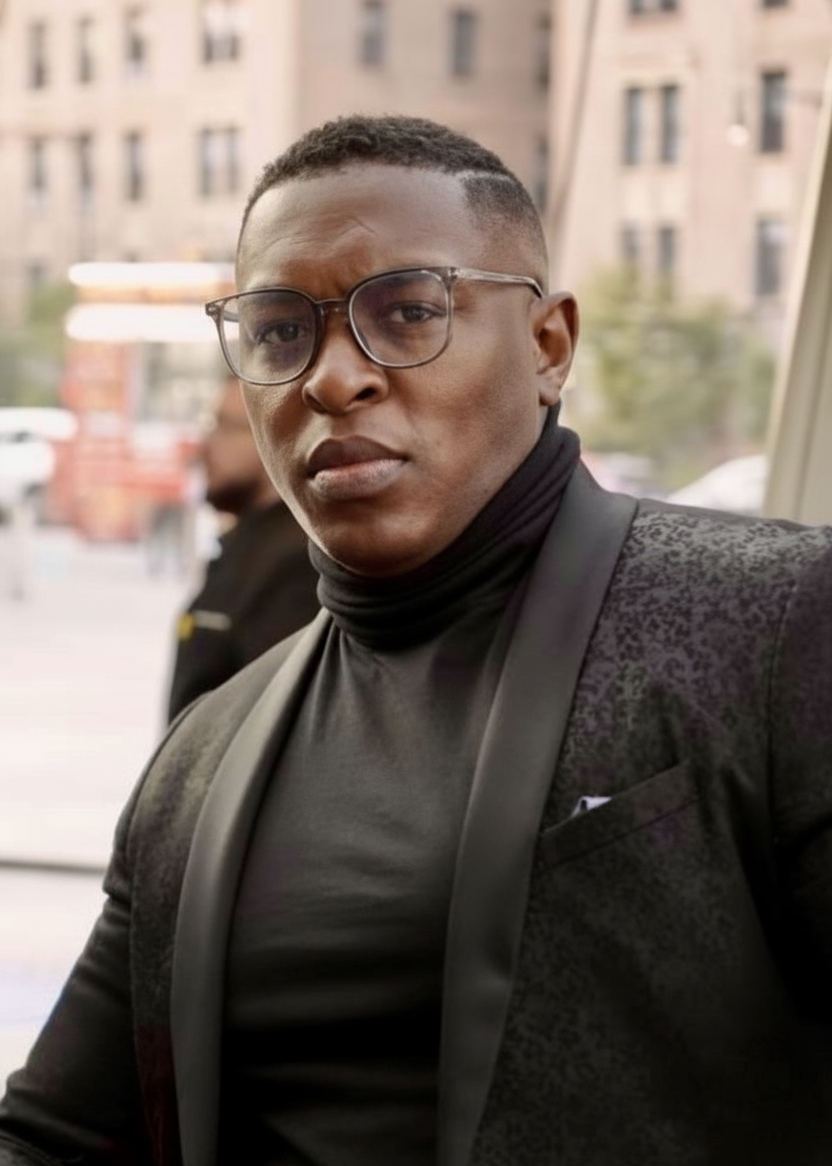
- Popsmoke Tribute Event at Brooklyn Museum in Brooklyn, NY on July 22nd 2025
- Born: April 22, 1987 (age 39); Far Rockaway, Queens, U.S.
- Occupations: Record Executive Publicist Coder; A&R; Businessman; Songwriter
- Years active: 2004–present
- Labels: Island; Def Jam; Popular Demand Entertainment
- Website: johnkwatakyeatiko.com

John Kwatakye-Atiko (/kwɑːˈtɑːtʃiː ɑːˈtiːkoʊ/ kwah-TAH-chee-ah-TEE-koh)(born April 22, 1987) also known as JKA, is an American music industry executive, publicist, coder, and entrepreneur. He is President of Popular Demand Entertainment a Record Label and Management company that develops Independent Artists.

== Early career ==
John Kwatakye-Atiko began his career at Island Def Jam Records, working as a mix-show promoter and on marketing campaigns for artists such as Jay-Z, Kanye West, Rihanna and Ludacris. His duties were to service mix-tape, radio DJ's and TV stations such as BET, MTV and VH1 with the latest releases.

== Popular Demand Entertainment ==
In 2016, Kwatakye-Atiko met recording artist Ariie West. They began officially collaborating in October 2022, Kwatakye-Atiko began focusing on developing marketing campaigns through Popular Demand Entertainment. Notably, their work together resulted in the song "Dangerous" achieving over one million streams across various platforms. In 2024 Kwatakye-Atiko on behalf of Popular Demand oversaw Marketing for Monique The Star ft. Capella Grey's single "Real Woman" released by Platinum Producer Jerry Duplessis's record label Wonda Music.

== Popularity PR ==
John Kwatakye-Atiko is the founder and president of Popularity PR, a public relations firm. Through the agency, he frequently serves as an industry expert for major media outlets, offering analysis on celebrity crisis management, entertainment strategy, business, pop culture and political trends.

His media commentary primarily focuses on:

=== Crisis Communications and Brand Protection ===
Kwatakye-Atiko frequently analyzes the reputational and financial impacts of high-profile disputes. He has provided extensive commentary on the PR strategies and consumer brand fallout surrounding the 2026 Blake Lively and Justin Baldoni legal settlement, as well as how strict NDAs dictate celebrity privacy and manage public rumors, such as those surrounding Taylor Swift and Travis Kelce.

=== Entertainment and Touring Strategy ===
He provides insight into the commercial decisions driving the music and film industries. His public analyses have covered the anatomy of a genuine career comeback versus a fleeting media moment (Justin Bieber at Coachella), the financial and demographic calculations behind controversial festival bookings (Ella Langley), and Hollywood's reliance on established IP and Millennial nostalgia for financial risk mitigation.

=== Political Media Tactics ===
Kwatakye-Atiko also examines the intersection of politics and entertainment, such as analyzing the viral, social-media-driven messaging strategies used by political figures like Barack Obama during late-night television appearances.

== Talk Money TV Show ==
Kwatakye-Atiko is the co-executive producer of the upcoming television series "Talk Money," produced by Popular Demand and hosted and co-executive produced by Content Coach Lindsay. The series aims to demystify wealth building and make financial literacy accessible to a diverse audience. The show will feature interviews with celebrities, music executives, entrepreneurs, athletes, government officials, and authors, who will share their experiences in turning their passion into profit. The series focuses on delivering financial literacy, offering actionable insights and real-world examples of achieving financial success.

== Discography ==
Complete discography
Year	Album	Artist	Role
2003	The Black Album (Jay-Z album)	Jay-Z	Marketing & MixShow Promo Island Def Jam
2004	The Red Light District	Ludacris	Marketing & MixShow Promo Island Def Jam
2004	The College Dropout	Kanye West	Marketing & MixShow Promo Rocafella Records Island Def Jam
2004	It's About Time	Christina Milian	Marketing & MixShow Promo Island Def Jam
2004	The DEFinition	LL Cool J	Marketing & MixShow Promo Island Def Jam
2005	Bobby Valentino (album)	Bobby V	Marketing & MixShow Promo Island Def Jam
2005	The B. Coming	Beanie Sigel	Marketing & MixShow Promo Rocafella Records Island Def Jam
2005	534	Memphis Bleek	Marketing & MixShow Promo Rocafella Records Island Def Jam
2005	Roc-A-Fella Records Presents Teairra Marí	Teairra Marí	Marketing & MixShow Promo Rocafella Records Island Def Jam
2005	Music of the Sun	Rihanna	Marketing & MixShow Promo Island Def Jam
2005	Let's Get It: Thug Motivation 101	Jeezy	Marketing & MixShow Promo Island Def Jam
2005	The Emancipation of Mimi	Mariah Carey's	Marketing & MixShow Promo Island Def Jam
2005	Late Registration	Kanye West	Marketing & MixShow Promo Rocafella Records Island Def Jam
2006	In My Own Words	Ne-Yo	Marketing & MixShow Promo Island Def Jam
2006	Release Therapy	Ludacris	Marketing & MixShow Promo Island Def Jam
2006	Kingdom Come	Jay-Z	Marketing & MixShow Promo Rocafella Records Island Def Jam
2006	Coming Home	Lionel Richie	Marketing & MixShow Promo Island Def Jam
2006	So Amazin'	Christina Milian	Marketing & MixShow Promo Island Def Jam
2006	The Inspiration: Thug Motivation 102	Jeezy	Marketing & MixShow Promo Island Def Jam
2006	Todd Smith (album)	LL Cool J	Marketing & MixShow Promo Island Def Jam
2006	A Girl Like Me	Rihanna	Marketing & MixShow Promo Island Def Jam
2007	Good Girl Gone Bad	Rihanna	Marketing & MixShow Promo Island Def Jam
2007	Special Occasion	Bobby V	Marketing & MixShow Promo Island Def Jam
2007	Love/Hate (The-Dream album)	The-Dream	Marketing & MixShow Promo Island Def Jam
2007	Because of You	Ne-Yo	Marketing & MixShow Promo Island Def Jam
2010	Brother Clyde (album)	Billy Ray Cyrus Ft. King Phaze	Executive Consultant Walt Disney Records
2023	Dangerous (Single)	Ariie West	Co-Executive Producer
2023	Betcha	Chantae Vetrice	Executive Producer
2024	Cash App	Chantae Vetrice	Executive Producer
2024	VEGAS (What Goes On)	Chantae Vetrice	Executive Producer
2025	All I Know (We Ride)	Freaky Kah feat Chantae Vetrice	Executive Producer
2025	Mad Scientist	Yah-Sin feat Method Man	Executive Producer
2025	Killa Whale	Prayah feat Sheek Louch & Hue Hef	Executive Producer

== DOPE. Music ==
Kwatakye-Atiko co-founded DOPE with Mathew "Vine" Burke. DOPE integrates a mentorship program, offering artists exclusive monthly content focused on the music industry's business aspects.
