= Lady London =

American rapper (born 1995)

- Born: Zaire Miylaun Stewart; June 25, 1995 (age 31); The Bronx, New York, U.S.
- Origin: East Orange, New Jersey, U.S.
- Genres: Hip hop; R&B
- Occupations: Rapper; songwriter
- Years active: 2018–present
- Labels: High Standardz; Def Jam (former)
- Website: www.bossladylondon.com

Zaire Miylaun Stewart (born June 25, 1995), known professionally as Lady London, is an American rapper from The Bronx, New York, currently based in Los Angeles. Her debut compilation album S.O.U.L. (Signs of Universal Love)—preceded by two mixtapes—was released on November 3, 2023.

== Early life ==
London was born in The Bronx, New York, to a Jamaican mother and Trinidadian father. Raised in her grandmother's house in East Orange, New Jersey, she started composing poems at the age of 11, which she used as "an outlet to speak about [her] anger and what was bringing [her] in [those] spaces". She graduated in 2012 from Mother Seton Regional High School in Clark, New Jersey. London attended Howard University, where she studied and received a bachelor's degree in sports medicine and chemistry before later attending the University of Southern California and receiving a master's degree in global medicine with a concentration in international health policy. During that time, her original goal was to become an orthopedic surgeon.

== Career ==
In March 2018, London posted a video of her freestyling while sitting in a car via her Twitter account, which soon went viral and received praise from media outlets. Afterwards, she began recording and posting more freestyles titled "Lady Londays", which helped her gain more traction. On July 30, 2019, she independently released a song titled "Woosah" to digital platforms and started a dance challenge to promote the track. In 2021, she released two official singles: "Money Over" and "Never", which were both accompanied with music videos, to generally favorable reviews from critics. On January 14, 2022, London released her first solo full-length project, a mixtape titled Lady Like: The Boss Tape; the mixtape consists of thirteen tracks, majority of them being freestyles. A few months later, she released a single "What Is It Giving", produced by Kosine, alongside its music video. While speaking on the song, she said: "Creating this record, I wanted a chant... one that felt comfortable enough to repeat, while also being full of caption-worthy rhetoric. The perfect balance."

In September 2022, London made her acting debut in the Sanaa Lathan-directed musical drama film On the Come Up as the character Ms. Tique. To promote the film, she was featured alongside Jamila C. Gray and Rapsody on a song of the same name, which was later featured on the film's soundtrack. On March 23, 2023, she signed a joint record deal with High Standardz and Def Jam Recordings. On April 14, 2023, she was featured on the remix to Ciara's song "Da Girls" entitled the "Girls Mix" alongside Lola Brooke. On October 10, 2023, she performed on the BET Hip Hop Awards cypher alongside Brooke, Gloss Up and Bun B. London's debut compilation album S.O.U.L. (acronym of Signs of Universal Love) was released on November 3, 2023. The album was preceded by the releasing of two singles "Yea Yea" (with Dreezy) and "Do Something" (featuring Jeremih). It features guest appearances from Dreezy, Jeremih, B-Boy Stance, Tink, Omeretta the Great, Capella Grey, Brooke Valentine and Mila J.

== Musical style ==
A defining aspect of her style is her bravado and her “Boss-Lady” persona.

== Discography ==
Compilation albums

- S.O.U.L. (2023)

Mixtapes

- I Kant Make This Shit Up (with Murrille) (2022)
- Lady Like: The Boss Tape (2022)
