= Chantae =

Chantae or Chantay is a feminine given name which may refer to:

- Chantae McMillan (born 1988), American heptathlete
- Chantae Vetrice, American rapper and singer
- Chantay Savage (born 1971), American R&B/dance singer
- Chantay Black, a character in the television series Degrassi: The Next Generation

== See also ==
- Chanté Moore (born 1967), American singer-songwriter, television personality and author
- Chanty, a traditional sailors' folk song
- Chanty (singer), Filipino singer and actress Maria Chantal Videla (born 2002), a member of the South Korean girl group Lapillus
