= Popular Demand Entertainment =

American record label

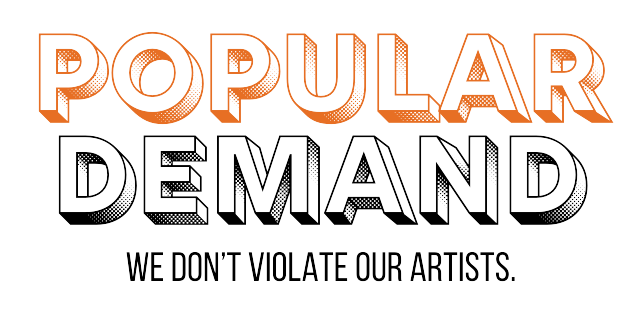
- Founded: February 9, 2023; 3 years ago
- Founder: John Kwatakye-Atiko
- Distributor: Vydia a Gamma Company
- Genre: Various
- Country of origin: United States
- Location: New York City, New York
- Official website: pdentmt.com

Popular Demand Entertainment is an American record label and entertainment company founded by John Kwatakye-Atiko. The company specializes in artist development, brand enhancement, and music releases within the Hip-Hop, R&B, and Pop genres.

Kwatakye-Atiko launched the label in February of 2023. Popular Demand Entertainment operates as an incubator label, focusing on building sustainable artist brands through a combination of music production, lifestyle integration, and strategic marketing and promotions. The company's mission is to provide artists with the resources and support necessary to navigate the complexities of the modern music industry.

== Current ==
- Prayah
- Freaky Kah
- Yah Sin
- Kyra Kane
- Ginzee
- William Revenue
- Nnish
- Tron Dada
- Lilith's Lotus
- Marvlous Marv
- Prayah
- Freaky Kah
- Yah Sin
- Kyra Kane
- Ginzee
- William Revenue
- Nnish
- Tron Dada
- Lilith's Lotus
- Marvlous Marv

== Former artists ==
- Chantae Vetrice

== Discography ==
=== Singles ===
List of singles
Title	Year
"Betcha" (By Chantae Vetrice)	2023
"Cash App" (By Chantae Vetrice)	2024
"VEGAS (What Goes On)" (By Chantae Vetrice)	2024
"All I Know (We Ride)" (By Freaky Kah feat Chantae Vetrice)	2025

== Television ==
=== Talk Money Show ===
Popular Demand Entertainment, and record executive John Kwatakye-Atiko, is producing the upcoming television series, "Talk Money." Hosted and co-executive produced by Content Coach Lindsay, the series aims to democratize wealth-building and enhance financial literacy for a broad audience. "Talk Money" will feature in-depth interviews with a diverse array of guests, including celebrity music executives, entrepreneurs, athletes, government officials, and authors, who will share their personal journeys of transforming passion into profit. The series focuses on providing actionable financial insights and real-world examples of achieving financial success, with the intent of making complex financial concepts accessible and engaging. "Talk Money" is scheduled for release in the fall of 2025 on Amazon Prime, Freevee, and Tubi.
