= Samson: The Album =

Studio album by Chika
- Released: July 28, 2023
- Genre: Hip hop
- Length: 54:13
- Label: Warner
- Producer: Derek Dixie

Chika chronology
Once Upon a Time (2020)	Samson: The Album (2023)

Singles from Samson: The Album
- 1. "Requiem for a Dream" Released: June 2, 2023; 2. "Truth or Dare" Released: June 30, 2023; 3. "Demigod" Released: July 7, 2023; 4. "Mad" Released: July 21, 2023

Samson: The Album is the debut studio album by American rapper Chika. It was released on July 28, 2023, through Warner.

== Background and composition ==
The album's title was inspired by Samson, an Old Testament figure who loses his superhuman strength in an act of betrayal by his lover Delilah. Chika described how this story resonated with her in an interview with Rolling Stone magazine.

I think that my strength has always been my vulnerability, but at the same time, it’s always been my weakness because that’s the thing that’s weaponized the most against me. I wanted to tell my story based on Samson because there’s been a lot of pitfalls; things that have publicly been about me that would look like a loss.

— Chika, in Mankaprr Conteh, "Chika Can Explain Everything", Rolling Stone, 2023

In that same interview, Chika disclosed how her mental health struggles, particularly with post-traumatic stress disorder, had influenced the album's lyrical content.

== Release ==
In June 2023, Chika released two singles: "Requiem for a Dream" and "Truth or Dare," a collaboration with Freddie Gibbs. Samson: The Album was announced alongside the release of album's third single, "Demigod", on July 7. The album's fourth single, "Mad", was released on July 21 and the full project was released a week later.

== Track listing ==
Samson: The Album track listing
No.	Title	Writer(s)	Producer(s)	Length
1.	"Overture" (featuring Lin-Manuel Miranda)	Jane Chika Oranika; Derek Dixie; Lin-Manuel Miranda	Dixie; Chika	2:15
2.	"Intro"	Oranika; Derek Dixie	Dixie; Chika	2:23
3.	"Requiem for a Dream"	Oranika; Corinne Bailey Rae; Derek Dixie; Thurst	Thurst; Dixie; Chika	2:06
4.	"Truth or Dare" (featuring Freddie Gibbs)	Andrew Cohen; Carron Mitchell; Oranika; Derek Dixie; Peder Losnegård	Lido; Mayer Hawthorne; Dixie; Chika	4:05
5.	"Outro"	Oranika; Chris Urbanowicz; Derek Dizie; Edward Lay; Russell Leetch; Thurst; Tom Smith	Thurst; Dixie; Chika	0:50
6.	"Demigod"	Oranika; Derek Dixie	Dixie; Chika	4:34
7.	"Night 4"	Oranika; Derek Dixie; Ophlin Russell; Winston Riley	Dixie; Chika	3:05
8.	"Awards"	Oranika; Derek Dixie	Dani Pampuri; Filipe Pampuri; Dixie; Chika	4:03
9.	"Mad"	Oranika; Andre Robertson; Andrew Gradwohl Jr.; Carl Taylor; Dixie; Derelle Rideout; Zachary Perry	Bizness Boi; Derelle Rideout; Ekzakt; Jupiter!; BigWhitebeatz; Dixie; Chika	2:46
10.	"Prodigy"	Oranika; Daniel Pampuri; Derek Dixie	Dani Pampuri; Dixie; Chika	4:39
11.	"Intermission"	Oranika; Dixie	Dixie; Chika	0:43
12.	"Show Me"	Oranika; Daniel Pampuri; Derek Dixie; Filipe Pampuri	Dixie; Dani Pampuri; Filipe Pampuri; Chika	1:58
13.	"Plain Jane"	Oranika; Dixie	Dixie; Chika	3:17
14.	"Tap"	Oranika; Dixie	Dixie; Chika	2:28
15.	"Hurt"	Oranika; Dixie	Dixie; Chika	1:44
16.	"Unc's Interlude" (featuring Snoop Dogg)	Oranika; Snoop Dogg	Snoop Dogg	0:46
17.	"Blind"	Oranika; Declan Miers; Dixie; Filipe Pampuri; Snoop Dogg	Dixie; Declan Miers; Filipe Pampuri; Chika	3:17
18.	"Brother's Betrayal"	Oranika; Wale		1:08
19.	"Delilah"	Oranika; Dixie	Dixie; Chika	3:19
20.	"Get Here" (featuring Stevie Wonder)	Oranika; Dixie	Dixie; Chika	4:38
Total length:				54:13
