= Beauty and the Beast (EP) =

EP by Rapsody
- Released: October 7, 2014
- Genre: Hip-hop
- Length: 38:48
- Label: Jamla
- Producers: Nottz; Eric G.; 9th Wonder; Khrysis; Problem

Rapsody chronology
The Idea of Beautiful (2012)	Beauty and the Beast (2014)	Laila's Wisdom (2017)

Beauty and the Beast is the second EP released by the hip-hop artist Rapsody. It was released on October 7, 2014, by Jamla Records.

== Background ==
On September 9, 2014, Rapsody announced her latest project on Instagram with the release date of October 7, 2014, along with a picture of the artwork. After the EP's release, she released music videos for the songs "Drama", "Godzilla", and "The Man" through Vevo, all directed by Cam Be.

== Critical reception ==
Professional ratings
Review scores
Source	Rating
Complex	3/5 stars
HipHopDX	4/5 stars

Beauty and the Beast received generally positive reviews from critics. HipHopDX reviewer Marcus Dowling called it "a stellar take on her strengths", albeit one that does not "experiment enough with her delivery to truly carry Jamla's searing production." Justin Charity from Complex regarded the EP as "a work of brute strength and self-determination. There’s zero capitulation to popular taste." In Vice, Robert Christgau called it an "underground rap manifesto as genuinely worthwhile endeavor", citing "Hard to Choose" and "The Man" as highlights.

== Track listing ==
All tracks are written by Rapsody.

No.	Title	Producer(s)	Length
1.	"Feel It (Intro)"	Nottz	3:53
2.	"Who I Am"	Eric G.	3:32
3.	"Hard to Choose"	9th Wonder	4:14
4.	"Drama"	Khrysis	3:10
5.	"Waiting on It (Baby Girl)" (featuring Problem)	Problem & Eric G	3:31
6.	"The World"	Khrysis	1:40
7.	"Godzilla" (featuring Khrysis)	9th Wonder	5:56
8.	"The Man"	Eric G.	6:23
9.	"Coming for You"	9th Wonder	3:55
10.	"Forgive Me (I'm Sorry)"	Eric G.	3:30
Total length:			38:48

iTunes deluxe edition (bonus tracks)
No.	Title	Producer(s)	Length
11.	"Don't Need It" (featuring Merna)	Young Guru	4:17
12.	"For You"	Eric G.	3:19
13.	"Believe Her" (featuring Merna)	9th Wonder	4:00
Total length:			50:24
