= Eve (Rapsody album) =

Studio album by Rapsody
- Released: August 23, 2019
- Genre: Hip hop
- Length: 62:59
- Label: Jamla; Roc Nation
- Producer: 9th Wonder; Khrysis; Nottz; Eric G; Mark Byrd

Rapsody chronology
Laila's Wisdom (2017)	Eve (2019)	Please Don't Cry (2024)

Eve is the third studio album by American rapper Rapsody, released on August 23, 2019. Each song is named for an influential black woman, including Michelle Obama, Oprah Winfrey, Myrlie Evers, and Aaliyah. Eve also samples artists like Phil Collins (his hit single "In the Air Tonight" was sampled on the second track "Cleo"), Nina Simone and Herbie Hancock.

== Production ==
Rapsody decided to write the album in 2018 when a writer asked her if she felt that she was a successor to Nina Simone and Roberta Flack. She crafted an album with each song dedicated to one of her heroes.

== Critical reception ==
Professional ratings
Aggregate scores
Source	Rating
AnyDecentMusic?	8.0/10
Metacritic	90/100
Review scores
Source	Rating
AllMusic	5/5 stars
And It Don't Stop	A−
Evening Standard	4/5 stars
The Guardian	4/5 stars
HipHopDX	5/5
The Independent	5/5 stars
Pitchfork	8.0/10
Q	4/5 stars
Rolling Stone	4/5 stars
Tom Hull – on the Web	B+

Eve was critically acclaimed by contemporary music critics at the time of its release. At Metacritic, which assigns a normalized rating out of 100 to reviews from mainstream publications, the album received an average score of 90, based on 8 reviews.

Andy Kellman reviewed the album for AllMusic, concluding that "[Rapsody's] lyrical marksmanship, top-tier mike command, and service to her people and culture are indisputable." Reviewing the album for HipHopDX, Kyle Eustice claimed that "The 16-track potent lyrical adventure is peppered with countless poetic musings masquerading as seamless Hip Hop tracks, easily solidifying Rapsody's musical legacy." In the review for Pitchfork, Sheldon Pearce described Rapsody as "A self-professed rapper's rapper, [she] has been taut and inflexible in the past, almost as if having to force her immense talent to overcome a deck stacked against her. It sounds like she's in a home-run trot on Eve."

Roisin O'Conner also praised the album in the review for The Independent; "Women’s power, as a source of strength, intellect, emotion and, most importantly, life, has been a recurring theme in the North Carolina artist’s work for years. On her new album, Eve, she explores a lineage of black female icons in a way that is both tender and compelling." Writing about the album's content, Stephen Kearse stated in a review for Rolling Stone that "Throughout Eve, Rapsody speaks frankly of the burdens black women bear, citing infighting that perpetuates sexism ("Cleo") as well as the psychic costs of the violence that black men endure ("Myrlie") and commit ("Afeni"). These are not new themes for her, but here they resonate more fully. As she taps into the specific struggles and tribulations borne by her idols, she sees her own battles with visibility and self-assurance more clearly. Black girls are magic, but they are also people." In the review for The Guardian, Aimee Cliff declared, "With a delivery cut from the same cloth as Jay-Z or Lauryn Hill, she’s a storyteller, and counterbalances her wisdom with a dry, playful wit. Plus, she’s the queen of the dismissive one-liner."

In a year-end essay for Slate, Ann Powers cited Eve as one of her favorite albums from 2019 and proof that the format is not dead but rather undergoing a "metamorphosis". She added that concept albums had reemerged through the culturally-relevant autobiographical narratives of artists such as Rapsody, who created a tribute to her ancestors "that spoke volumes about black life today".

== Track listing ==
Eve track listing
No.	Title	Writer(s)	Producer(s)	Length
1.	"Nina"	Mark Byrd; Marlanna Evans; Lewis Allen	Mark Byrd	4:20
2.	"Cleo"	Evans; Patrick Douthit; Phil Collins	9th Wonder	4:00
3.	"Aaliyah"	Evans; Eric Gabouer; Brandon Canada; Derek Gamlan; Sabrina Claudio	Eric G	3:54
4.	"Oprah" (featuring Leikeli47)	Evans; Gabouer; Sauveur Mallia	Eric G	5:02
5.	"Whoopi"	Evans; Christopher Tyson; Herbie Hancock	Khrysis	3:12
6.	"Serena"	Evans; Gabouer; Jacob Dutton; Luther Campbell	Eric G	2:54
7.	"Tyra"	Evans; Gabouer; Björk Gudmundsdottir; Alejandra Ghersi	Eric G	2:01
8.	"Maya" (featuring K. Roosevelt)	Evans; Douthit; Kevin Moore II; Victor Cooke; Erica Wright; James Poyser	9th Wonder	3:41
9.	"Ibtihaj" (featuring GZA and D'Angelo)	Evans; Douthit; Michael Archer; Gary Grice; Eddie Brigati; Felix Cavaliere	9th Wonder	4:40
10.	"Myrlie" (featuring Mereba)	Evans; Gabouer; Marina Mereba; John Herbert	Eric G	2:21
11.	"Reyna's Interlude"	Douthit; Quintin Gulledge; Terrace Martin	9th Wonder	3:49
12.	"Michelle" (featuring Elle Varner)	Evans; Dominick Lamb; Elle Varner	Nottz	3:49
13.	"Iman" (featuring Sir and JID)	Evans; Douthit; Sir Farris; Destin Route; Morris Bailey Jr.	9th Wonder	4:35
14.	"Hatshepsut" (featuring Queen Latifah)	Evans; Lamb; Dana Owens	Nottz	3:15
15.	"Sojourner" (featuring J. Cole)	Evans; Douthit; Jermaine Cole; Kendra Morris; Jeremy Page	9th Wonder	5:31
16.	"Afeni" (featuring PJ Morton)	Evans; Douthit; PJ Morton; Tupac Shakur; Daryl Anderson; Roger Troutman; Stan Vincent; Deniece Williams; Susaye Greene; Hank Redd; Nathan Watts	9th Wonder	5:53
Total length:				62:59

Sample credits

- "Nina" contains a sample of "Strange Fruit" written by Lewis Allen and performed by Nina Simone.
- "Cleo" contains samples of "In The Air Tonight" written and performed by Phil Collins.
- "Aaliyah" contains a sample of "Natural" written by Sabrina Claudio, Brandon Canada and Derek Gamlan and performed by Sabrina Claudio.
- "Oprah" contains a sample of "Electronic Africa" written and performed by Sauveur Mallia
- "Whoopi" contains a sample of "Watermelon Man" written and performed by Herbie Hancock.
- "Serena" contains samples of "I Wanna Rock (Doo-Doo Brown) written by Luther Campbell and Jacob Dutton and performed by Luke.
- "Tyra" contains a sample of "The Gate" written by Björk Guðmundsdóttir and Alejandra Ghersi and performed by Björk.
- "Maya" contains a sample of "Green Eyes" written by Erica Wright, James Poyser and Victor Cooke and performed by Erykah Badu.
- "Ibtihaj" contains samples of "Groovin'" written by Eddie Brigati and Felix Cavaliere and performed by Willie Mitchell as well as "Liquid Swords" written and performed by GZA.
- "Ibtihaj" also contains a sample of "Things Done Changed" performed by The Notorious B.I.G.
- "Myrlie" contains a sample of "The Audience" written and performed by Herbert
- "Michelle" contains samples of "Rhodes Piano Four" performed by Dexter Wansel and "Da Butt" performed by E. U.
- "Iman" contains a sample of "Ebony Woman" written by Morris Bailey and performed by Billy Paul.
- "Iman" also contains a sample of "The Madman" performed by McKendree Spring
- "Hatshepsut" contains a sample of "U.N.I.T.Y." written and performed by Queen Latifah
- "Hatshepsut" also contains samples of "Practice What You Preach" performed by Barry White and "Dancing Through the Day" performed by Rob Mullins
- "Sojourner" contains a sample of "If You Didn't Go" written by Kendra Morris and Jeremy Page and performed by Kendra Morris.
- "Sojourner" also contains a sample of "Is Anyone There" performed by Hookfoot
- "Afeni" contains a sample of "Keep Ya Head Up" written by Tupac Shakur, Daryl Anderson, Roger Troutman and Stan Vincent and performed by 2Pac.
- "Afeni" also contains a sample of "Free" written by Deniece Williams, Susaye Greene, Hank Redd and Nathan Watts and performed by Deniece Williams.

== Charts ==
Chart performance for Eve
Chart (2019)	Peak position
US Billboard 200	76
US Top R&B/Hip-Hop Albums (Billboard)	42
