= Laila's Wisdom =

Studio album by Rapsody
- Released: September 22, 2017
- Genre: Hip hop
- Length: 64:29
- Labels: Jamla; Roc Nation
- Producers: 9th Wonder; Eric G; Ka$h Don't Make Beats; Khrysis; Nottz

Rapsody chronology
Beauty and the Beast (2014)	Laila's Wisdom (2017)	Eve (2019)

Laila's Wisdom is the second studio album by American rapper Rapsody, released on September 22, 2017, by Jamla Records and Roc Nation. It is Rapsody's first album released under her partnership with Roc Nation. The album features collaborations with Kendrick Lamar (with whom Rapsody had previously collaborated on To Pimp a Butterfly), Anderson .Paak, Busta Rhymes, Lance Skiiiwalker, Black Thought, BJ the Chicago Kid, and Musiq Soulchild, among others.

== Background ==
The album is Rapsody's first following her signing with Roc Nation in 2016, and follows her mixtape Crown (2016).

Rapsody has previously collaborated with several of the guests on the record, including Kendrick Lamar, who she collaborated with on the track "Complexion (A Zulu Love)" from Lamar's 2015 album To Pimp a Butterfly, which is credited with gaining Rapsody wider attention than she had had previously. Lamar also rapped on the track "Rock the Bells" from her 2011 mixtape For Everything. Rapsody also appeared on Anderson .Paak's album Malibu, on "Without You". Paak also appeared on Crown.

In early September, Rapsody released "You Should Know", featuring Busta Rhymes, as the first single from the album. In an Instagram post, Rhymes called the album "the best album I've heard not only from a female MC but in Hip hop period as well that I've personally had a chance to hear from top to bottom in its entirety that I've probably in the last 10yrs [sic]".

The guest appearances for the album were revealed in a video featuring Rapsody in a mural surrounded by the guests that appear on the record.

== Critical reception ==
Professional ratings
Aggregate scores
Source	Rating
Metacritic	87/100
Review scores
Source	Rating
AllMusic	4/5 stars
Exclaim!	9/10
HipHopDX	4.5/5
Now	4/5 stars
RapReviews	9/10
Tom Hull	B+
Vice	A−
XXL	4/5

Laila's Wisdom received widespread acclaim from critics. At Metacritic, which assigns a normalized rating out of 100 to reviews from mainstream publications, the album received an average score of 87, based on seven reviews.

Michael J. Warren of Exclaim! called it Rapsody's best work, as well as "the best amongst her peers, the sort of album that transcends the lane she was in beforehand, transcends whatever antiquated gender biases may still permeate the genre and puts her in the same category as your favourite rapper (who's now clamouring for a Rapsody feature)." Jesse Fairfax of HipHopDX found that "Rapsody evolves on this latest album—increasingly comfortable revealing a wide range of personal facets while developing into an apt storyteller." Writing for XXL, Peter A. Berry described the album as "a smooth, cohesive and powerfully insightful effort." In his review for AllMusic, writer Andy Kellman praised Rapsody's progression on the album, writing that "'Laila's Wisdom' is Evans' lyrically broadest and musically richest work, yet it doesn't have the sprawling quality of the first album. There's a finer, detail-filled shape to it, from the 'Young, Gifted, and Black' (Aretha)-sampling title track to 'Jesus Coming,' an astonishing finale in which Evans relates the aftermath of a playground tragedy from multiple perspectives."

=== Accolades ===
The album received two Grammy Award nominations for Best Rap Album and Best Rap Song.

Accolades for Laila's Wisdom
Publication	Accolade	Year	Rank	Ref.
Drowned in Sound	Favourite Albums of 2017	2017	95	
Rolling Stone	200 Greatest Hip-Hop Albums of All Time	2022	112	

== Track listing ==
Laila's Wisdom track listing
No.	Title	Writer(s)	Producer(s)	Length
1.	"Laila's Wisdom"	Marlanna Evans; Dominic Lamb; Nina Simone; Weldon Irvine	Nottz	3:14
2.	"Power" (featuring Kendrick Lamar and Lance Skiiiwalker)	Evans; Kendrick Duckworth; Lance Howard; Patrick Douthit; William Collins; George Clinton, Jr.; Gary Cooper; Chuck Jackson; Walter Godfrey	9th Wonder	5:34
3.	"Chrome (Like Ooh)"	Evans; Christopher Tyson; Kashif "Ka$h Don't Make Beats" Norville	Khrysis; Ka$h Don't Make Beats	3:27
4.	"Pay Up"	Evans; Tyson; Norville	Khrysis; Ka$h Don't Make Beats	3:16
5.	"Ridin'" (featuring GQ)	Evans; Quentin "GQ" Thomas; Douthit; Eric Gabouer; Andre Solomko; John Hammink	9th Wonder; Eric G	4:51
6.	"Sassy"	Evans; Gabouer	Eric G	3:13
7.	"Nobody" (featuring Anderson .Paak, Black Thought, and Moonchild)	Evans; Brandon Anderson; Tariq Trotter; Amber Navaran; Max Bryk; Andris Mattson; Tyson; Douthit; Art Neville; Leo Nocentelli; George Porter, Jr.; Ziggy Modeliste; Ronja Gullichsen; Arthur Franck; Rauli Eskolin	Khrysis; 9th Wonder	7:27
8.	"Black & Ugly" (featuring BJ the Chicago Kid)	Evans; Bryan Sledge; Douthit; Charlene Keys; Craig Brockman; Charles Bereal; Jairus Mozee	9th Wonder	4:09
9.	"You Should Know" (featuring Busta Rhymes)	Evans; Trevor Smith; Douthit; Gabouer; Merna Bishouty; Robert Barnett; Cameron Gipp; Patrick Brown; Willie Knighton; Thomas Callaway; Rico Wade; Ray Murray	9th Wonder	6:17
10.	"A Rollercoaster Jam Called Love" (featuring Musiq Soulchild and Gwen Bunn)	Evans; Taalib Johnson; Gwen Bunn; Douthit; D'wayne Wiggins; Raphael Saadiq; Carl Wheeler; Michelle Hailey	9th Wonder	5:18
11.	"U Used 2 Love Me" (featuring Terrace Martin)	Evans; Terrace Martin; Douthit	9th Wonder	2:42
12.	"Knock on My Door" (featuring BJ the Chicago Kid)	Evans; Sledge; Douthit; Gianni Marchetti; Piero Ciampi; Giuseppe Pavone	9th Wonder	4:41
13.	"OooWee" (featuring Anderson .Paak)	Evans; Anderson; Tyson	Khrysis	4:01
14.	"Jesus Coming" (featuring Amber Navaran)	Evans; Navran; Douthit; Martin; Otis G. Johnson	9th Wonder	6:19
Total length:				64:29

Notes

- ^{^[a]}Amber Navaran, Max Bryk, and Andris Mattison are collectively credited as Moonchild, their band name, for their feature on "Nobody".

== Personnel ==
- Rapsody – lead vocals (all tracks), engineering (tracks 3–4, 6, 12)
- 9th Wonder – engineering (tracks 1–2, 5–14), recording arranger (tracks 2–14), additional vocals (tracks 6–7, 10)
- Anderson .Paak – additional vocals (tracks 7, 13)
- Black Thought – additional vocals (track 7)
- Gwen Bunn – vocals, vocal arranger (track 10)
- Busta Rhymes – vocals (track 9, additional on 5)
- Coup de Grace – guitar, piano, recording arranger (track 9)
- Eric G – recording arranger (track 9)
- Ka$h Don't Make Beats – engineering (track 4)
- Khrysis – engineering (tracks 4, 12–13)
- Terrace Martin – keyboards (tracks 2, 6, 11, 13, additional on 1, 4–5, 7, 9–10, 12), recording arranger (tracks 2, 4–8, 10–13), saxophone (tracks 10–11), synthesizer (track 10), vocals (track 11)
- Merna – additional vocals (track 9)
- Musiq Soulchild – additional vocals (track 10)
- Amber Navaran^{[a]} – vocals (tracks 7, 14)
- Max Bryk^{[a]} – keyboards (track 7)
- Andris Mattison^{[a]} – keyboards (track 7)
- James Poyser – keyboards (tracks 3, 5)
- Taylor Jon Shepard – additional keyboards (tracks 1, 4)
- Heather Victoria – additional vocals (track 4)
- Marlon Williams – string arranger (tracks 2, 5–6, 8), guitar, recording arranger (track 4)
- Young Guru – engineering (tracks 5, 10)

== Charts ==
Chart performance for Laila's Wisdom
Chart (2017)	Peak position
US Billboard 200	125
