= The Idea of Beautiful =

Studio album by Rapsody
- Released: August 28, 2012
- Recorded: Brightlady Studios (Raleigh, North Carolina); Mac Miller's tour bus (Burlington, North Carolina); Lake Oasis Studios (Miami)
- Genre: Hip hop
- Length: 70:12
- Label: Jamla
- Producer: Khrysis; 9th Wonder; Eric Jones; AMP; Eric Gabouer.; Ka$h

Rapsody chronology
The Idea of Beautiful (2012)	Beauty and the Beast (2014)

Professional ratings
Review scores
Source	Rating
HipHopDX	4/5 stars
RapReviews	(8.5/10)

The Idea of Beautiful is the debut studio album by American rapper Rapsody. It was released through her independent record label, named It's a Wonderful World Music Group on August 28, 2012. The album features guest appearances from Big Rube, Raheem DeVaughn, Ab-Soul, Mac Miller, The Cool Kids, Buckshot, Childish Gambino, GQ, Big Remo, Heather Victoria, Rocki Evans, BJ the Chicago Kid, and Nomsa Mazwai. Production on the album was handled by its members of the musical group, called The Soul Council (consisting of 9th Wonder, Khrysis, Eric Jones, AMP, Eric Gabouer, and Ka$h).

The album was released after Rapsody has been receiving a critical acclaim through her mixtapes with Return of the B-Girl (2010), Thank H.E.R. Now (2011), and For Everything (2011), alongside her debut extended play (EP), The Black Mamba (2012).

== Background ==
The album includes the production by its members of the musical group, called The Soul Council (consisting of 9th Wonder, Khrysis, Eric Jones, AMP, Eric Gabouer, and Ka$h). The album features guest appearances from Big Rube, Raheem DeVaughn, Ab-Soul, Mac Miller, The Cool Kids, Buckshot, Childish Gambino, GQ, Big Remo, Heather Victoria, Rocki Evans, BJ the Chicago Kid, and Nomsa Mazwai.

== Singles and other songs ==
The album's first single was a track, "Believe Me", and its music video was released on YouTube and two more videos were released - the songs "Kind of Love" and "The Drums". All of these music videos were directed by It's a Wonderful World Music Group's in-house director Kenneth Price.

== Track listing ==
No.	Title	Writer(s)	Producer(s)	Length
1.	"Idea of Beautiful Intro"	M. Evans; C. Tyson	Khrysis	3:41
2.	"How Does It Feel" (featuring Rocki Evans)	M. Evans; R. Evans; C. Tyson	Khrysis	4:20
3.	"Precious Wings"	M. Evans; E. Gabouer	Eric G.	4:08
4.	"Believe Me"	M. Evans; P. Douthit	9th Wonder	5:08
5.	"Non Fiction" (featuring Raheem DeVaughn and Ab-Soul)	M. Evans; R. DeVaughn; H. Stevens; P. Douthit	9th Wonder	4:49
6.	"The Drums" (featuring Heather Victoria)	M. Evans; H. Victoria; P. Douthit; H. Gavin	9th Wonder	4:11
7.	"Kind of Love" (featuring Nomsa Mazwai)	M. Evans; N. Mazwai; M. Pholo; P. Douthit	9th Wonder	3:58
8.	"Role Play Interlude"			0:19
9.	"Destiny"	M. Evans; C. Tyson	Khrysis	2:28
10.	"Good Good Love" (featuring BJ the Chicago Kid)	M. Evans; B. Sledge; P. Douthit	9th Wonder	6:01
11.	"In the Town" (featuring Nomsa Mazwai)	M. Evans; N. Mazwai; M. Pholo; P. Douthit	9th Wonder	3:22
12.	"Round Table Discussion" (featuring Mac Miller and the Cool Kids)	M. Evans; M. McCormick; A. Reed; E. Ingersoll; P. Douthit	9th Wonder	4:18
13.	"The Cards" (featuring Big Remo)	M. Evans; R. Cash; W. Hendricks	AMP	4:46
14.	"Come Home" (featuring Rocki Evans)	M. Evans; R. Evans; C. Tyson; C. Clayton	Khrysis	3:24
15.	"When I Have You" (featuring Nomsa Mazwai)	M. Evans; N. Mozwai; M. Pholo; P. Douthit	9th Wonder	4:23
16.	"Believe Me (HaHaHa Remix)"	M. Evans; P. Douthit	9th Wonder	5:12
Total length:				1:11:04

Deluxe edition
No.	Title	Writer(s)	Producer(s)	Length
17.	"Beautiful Music" (featuring Childish Gambino and GQ)	M. Evans; D. Glover; Q. Thomas; Ka$h	Ka$h	5:07
18.	"Thunder"	M. Evans; P. Douthit	9th Wonder	3:18
Total length:				1:18:54

Sample credits

- "Destiny" contains a sample from "You're the One for Me" as performed by the Edwards Generation.

== Personnel ==
- Keyboards: Zo! on "Motivation"
- Acoustic guitar: Nick Hagelin on "Good Good Love"
- Recording engineer: 9th Wonder, Khrysis
- Mixing: Khrysis
- Executive Producer: 9th Wonder & Rapsody
- Artwork and design: Warren "AMP" Hendricks Jr.
- Photography: Adam Sikora
- Cover Photo: Patrick Douthit
