= Ariie West =

American musician and songwriter

- Born: Robert Nicholson Salik; April 4, 1999 (age 27); Harlem, New York, U.S.
- Genres: Hip hop; drill
- Occupations: Rapper; songwriter; record producer
- Label: Autrumn Records

Ariie West (born Robert Nicholson Salik on April 4, 1999) is an American rapper, songwriter, and record producer from Harlem, New York.

== Early life and career ==
West began his career at the age of 15 under the guidance of music executive Jay Jackson, also known as Ice Pick of Ruff Ryders. He was signed and assigned to create songs for Teyana Taylor, under Pharrell's label, Star Trak Entertainment.

== Career breakthrough ==
In 2016, West met music producer John Kwatakye-Atiko, marking a turning point in his career. Their professional collaboration officially began in October 2022. In January 2023, West released his single "Dangerous", which garnered 1.7 million views within its first two weeks on YouTube.
