= Gyalis =

2021 song by Capella Grey

Single by Capella Grey
- Released: January 4, 2021; June 17, 2021 (Re-released)
- Recorded: 2020
- Genre: R&B; dancehall; hip hop
- Length: 1:45
- Label: Allepac the Family; Capitol
- Songwriters: Byron Thomas; Curtis Jackson II; Dwayne Carter; Terius Gray
- Producer: Capella Grey

Capella Grey singles chronology
"One More Chance" (2020)	"Gyalis" (2021)	"Sas Crise" (2021)

Music video
- "Gyalis" on YouTube

"Gyalis" is a song by American singer Capella Grey. It was released on January 4, 2021, through Capitol Records and Allepac the Family. Rappers Mannie Fresh, Lil Wayne and Juvenile are credited as co-writers of the song as it samples Juvenile's "Back That Azz Up". The song went viral on TikTok, and gained over 18.1 million streams on Spotify by September 2021, reaching number 10 on the Billboard Hot R&B/Hip-Hop Songs chart.

== Background and composition ==
Grey told Billboard of the inspiration behind the song, explaining: "I was in LA [Los Angeles] at the time. I made the beat and got in the booth real quick, and after I recorded on it, I added a little more to the beat and then recorded on it some more and mixed it on my laptop. It just popped in my head, it wasn't too much of a buildup or anything like that. When the 'Back That Azz Up' sample plays in the club, it's a big moment. Turning that into a whole uptown type of feel, I felt like that really shook the room. Once I got the inspiration for it, I just went for it."

The song samples "Back That Azz Up" (1999) by Juvenile. It is written in the key of A♭ major, with a tempo of 96 beats per minute.

== Music video ==
An accompanying video was released on August 26, 2021, and directed by Brennan Rowe. It was filmed in Grey's hometown, Bronx, and "captures the heart and soul of New York's uptown movement". It features Grey "vibing in a sea of fans who eagerly came out take part in the shoot".

== Credits and personnel ==
Credits adapted from AllMusic.

- Dwayne Carter – composer
- Terius Gray – composer
- Capella Grey – engineer, mastering engineer, mixing, primary artist
- Curtis Jackson – composer, programming
- Byron Thomas – composer

== Charts ==
=== Weekly charts ===
Weekly chart performance for "Gyalis"
Chart (2021)	Peak position
Canada (Canadian Hot 100)	84
New Zealand Hot Singles (RMNZ)	34
Global 200 (Billboard)	161
UK Singles (OCC)	65
UK Hip Hop/R&B (OCC)	26
US Billboard Hot 100	38
US Hot R&B/Hip-Hop Songs (Billboard)	10
US Rhythmic (Billboard)	6

=== Year-end charts ===
Year-end chart performance for "Gyalis"
Chart (2021)	Position
US Hot R&B/Hip-Hop Songs (Billboard)	62

== Certifications ==
Region	Certification	Certified units/sales
United Kingdom (BPI)	Silver	200,000^{‡}
United States (RIAA)	Platinum	1,000,000^{‡}
^{‡} Sales+streaming figures based on certification alone.

== Remix versions ==
"Gyalis (Remix)"

Song by Capella Grey featuring Popcaan and Chris Brown
- Released: October 1, 2021
- Recorded: 2020–2021
- Genre: R&B; dancehall; hip hop
- Length: 3:16
- Label: Allepac the Family; Capitol
- Songwriters: Byron Thomas; Curtis Jackson II; Dwayne Carter; Terius Gray; Chris Brown; Andre Hugh Sutherland
- Producer: Capella Grey

Audio video
- "Gyalis" (Remix) on YouTube

The official remix was released on October 1, 2021, and features Jamaican dancehall artist Popcaan and R&B singer Chris Brown.

On May 31, 2022, Capella Grey released a "Shemix" featuring Chlöe with a female's perspective of the song. The remix was released after popular demand following Chlöe posting her remix and going viral on social media on May 10.

Other unofficial remixes were released by many artists including A Boogie wit da Hoodie, Tory Lanez, Kranium, Angel and Haile, among others.

=== Critical reception ===
Kim Somajor of The Source said that the remix "elevates the song", praising particularly Brown's "superlative singing flow". Alex Zidel of HotNewHipHop said that the artist featured on the remix "fit perfectly on the song" creating "an even stronger vibe" than the original version. Respect's writer called the remix "electrifying", stating that "the rich melodies and playful energy of “Gyalis” have made the song synonymous with the warmer months, and this new version only magnifies these feelings".

== Release history ==
Release history and versions for "Gyalis"
Region	Date	Format	Version	Label	Ref.
Various	January 4, 2021	Digital download; streaming	Original	Allepac the Family, Capitol	
Various	October 1, 2021	Digital download; streaming	Popcaan and Chris Brown remix	Allepac the Family, Capitol	
Various	May 31, 2022	Digital download; streaming	Chlöe remix	Allepac the Family, Capitol	
