= Chika (rapper) =

American rapper (born 1997)

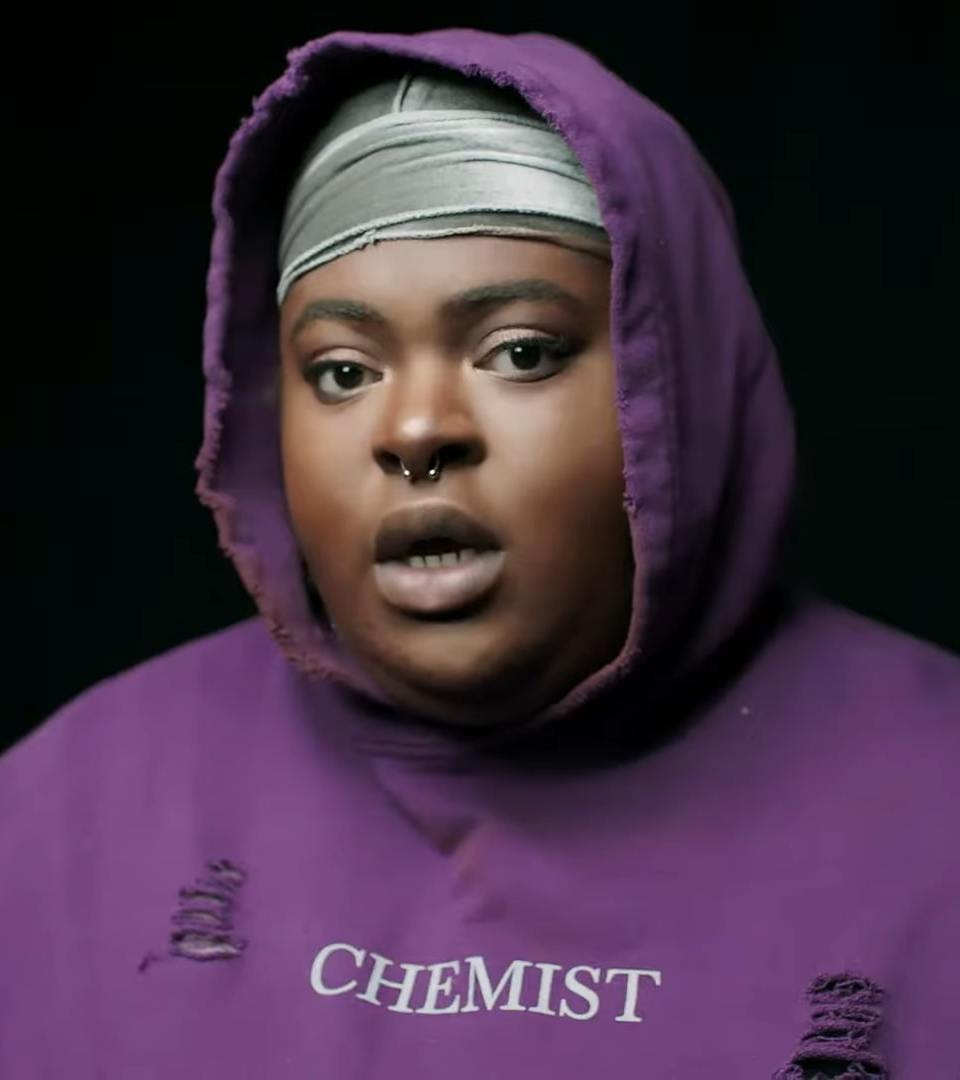
- Chika in 2020

Background information
- Born: Jane Chika Oranika; March 9, 1997 (age 29); Montgomery, Alabama, U.S.
- Genres: Hip hop; R&B
- Instrument: Vocals
- Years active: 2017–present
- Label: Warner

Jane Chika Oranika (born March 9, 1997), known mononymously as Chika (often stylized CHIKA), is an American rapper. She first garnered attention on social media before signing to Warner Records in 2019. The following year, she was included in XXL's 2020 Freshman Class and was nominated for the Grammy Award for Best New Artist. In July 2023 she released her album Samson: The Album, which was met with high praise from various music publications and critics alike.

== Early life ==
Chika was born in Montgomery, Alabama. Because of her interest in music and slam poetry, she attended Booker T. Washington Magnet High School. She was accepted at the prestigious Berklee College of Music, but due to tuition costs, she enrolled at the University of South Alabama instead. She dropped out after her first year to focus on a music career.

== Career ==
=== Music ===
==== 2016–2018: Social media career and freestyles ====
Chika first gained widespread attention following an Instagram post from November 9, 2016, the day after the 2016 United States presidential election. In the video, she covers herself in pale foundation, saying "African-American? Never felt that, never heard of that, never tasted that, never smelled that". Early in 2017, she created the #EgoChallenge, using the Beyoncé song of that title to promote body positivity and self-love. That year she also released a Pride-themed remix of Ed Sheeran's "Shape of You". On June 4, 2017, she released an independent EP of poetry called Full Bloom.

In 2018, Chika went viral for a freestyle addressed at Kanye West over West's own "Jesus Walks" beat. The freestyle concerned West's support for Donald Trump and caught the attention of Jada Pinkett Smith, Sean "Diddy" Combs, and Erykah Badu. She later released a freestyle dedicated to Nia Wilson. In August 2018, she featured on Rachel Crow's single "Coulda Told Me".

==== 2019–2021: Warner Records and Industry Games ====
Chika released her debut single, "No Squares", in April 2019. The following month, at the invitation of guest host Lena Waithe, she performed "Richey v. Alabama", another of her songs, on Jimmy Kimmel Live!. The song dealt with the state of Alabama's 2019 abortion bill and was named for a friend of Chika's. That summer, she signed a deal with Warner Records. Chika released two more singles as a lead artist in 2019: "High Rises" and "Can't Explain It" featuring Charlie Wilson. That year, she also featured on JoJo's "Sabotage", which reached number 18 on the Billboard US R&B Digital Downloads.

In December 2019, Chika announced that she was working on her debut extended play titled Industry Games. On January 23, 2020, Chika confirmed the title and posted snippets of music from the EP, telling followers the release was two months away. She released the EP's titular single on February 18. The EP was released on March 12, 2020. On August 11, 2020, Chika was included on XXL's 2020 Freshman Class. She was nominated for a Grammy Award for Best New Artist. and an NAACP Image Award for Outstanding New Artist. On March 11, 2021, Chika announced that her second EP Once Upon A Time would be released at midnight.

On April 10, 2021, Chika posted a widely publicized note to her Twitter account explaining her decision to retire from music while reflecting on the "mental toll" that life as a musician in the spotlight had taken on her health. In an Instagram Live session in which she interacted with fans following her initial retirement announcement, she criticized "trolls" or "stans" who "dogpile on top of people's other mental problems and make them worse." She specifically cited the effects of online abuse on her ongoing battle with depression on her decision, although she left a small possibility for a comeback in her final statement.

==== 2023–present: Samson: The Album ====
On July 7, 2023, Chika announced her full-length debut, Samson: The Album, by sharing lead single "DEMIGOD." The full album was released later that month.

=== Films ===
Chika had a role as a high school student in the 2020 Netflix Original film Project Power. She also contributed the track "My Power".

=== Fashion ===
In May 2019, Chika featured in a Calvin Klein #MyCalvins advertisement, also writing poetry for the brand's S/S 2019 campaign. That same year, she participated in a Business of Fashion panel at Paris Fashion Week and posed for the December cover of Teen Vogue. She was recognized by Business of Fashion as one of the top 500 people shaping the fashion industry in 2019.

== Personal life ==
Chika is the youngest of her Nigerian-American parents' three daughters. She is of Igbo descent and was raised in the Pentecostal faith.

Chika is bisexual and addresses her sexuality in her music and videos. In her video for "Can't Explain It", she put her own queer spin on A Different World, one of her favorite sitcoms.

On May 30, 2020, Chika was briefly detained by police at a Los Angeles protest following the police murder of George Floyd. She addressed the incident on social media the following day, emphasizing the peaceful nature of the demonstration prior to police involvement.

Chika shared her mental health struggles in a 2023 interview with Rolling Stone magazine published alongside the release of Samson: The Album. She described how the project had been influenced by her experiences processing trauma and disclosed that she had been diagnosed with bipolar II disorder the year prior. Chika has said that she was diagnosed with autism at age 27. In a 2026 episode of Shirley's Temple, she said that she initially began to self-identify with autism before undergoing testing, which confirmed her understanding of herself.

On March 25, 2022, Chika took to her Instagram story with concerning messages alluding to taking her own life. With posts such as "I'm not making it home" and "Madison, actually. Hope ur happy," fans begun to get concerned. The following day she went back to her Instagram stories to discuss her suicide attempt at the InterConntinental Hotel in St. Paul Minnesota, with some heartfelt messages thanking fans for their concern and discussing the mental hardships she had been enduring.

== Discography ==
Chika discography
- EPs: 4
- Singles: 19

=== Studio albums ===
Title	Details
Samson: The Album	Released: July 28, 2023; Label: Warner Records; Format: Digital download, streaming

=== Extended plays ===
Title	Details
Full Bloom // A Poetry EP	Released: June 4, 2017; Label: Self-released; Format: Digital download
Industry Games	Released: March 12, 2020; Label: Warner; Format: Digital download, streaming
Spotify Singles	Released: March 9, 2021; Label: Warner; Format: Digital download, streaming
Once Upon a Time	Released: March 12, 2021; Label: Warner; Format: Digital download, streaming

=== Singles ===
==== As lead artist ====
Title	Year	Peak chart positions					Certifications	Album
Title	Year	US Dance	AUS	IRE	NZ	UK	Certifications	Album
"xFaded"	2017	—	—	—	—	—		Non-album singles
"Juke Jam" (cover)	2017	—	—	—	—	—		Non-album singles
"Love Galore" (cover)	2017	—	—	—	—	—		Non-album singles
"(Get You)" cover	2017	—	—	—	—	—		Non-album singles
"Lovin' You" (poem)	2017	—	—	—	—	—		Non-album singles
"Spoiled" (cover)	2017	—	—	—	—	—		Non-album singles
"Smile"	2017	—	—	—	—	—		Non-album singles
"Monsters"	2017	—	—	—	—	—		Non-album singles
"Congratulations" (cover)	2017	—	—	—	—	—		Non-album singles
"Want Me"	2018	—	—	—	—	—		Non-album singles
"KOD" (Remix)	2018	—	—	—	—	—		Non-album singles
"No Squares"	2019	—	—	—	—	—		Non-album singles
"High Rises"	2019	—	—	—	—	—		Non-album singles
"Can't Explain It" (featuring Charlie Wilson)	2020	—	—	—	—	—		Non-album singles
"Industry Games"	2020	—	—	—	—	—		Industry Games
"U Should"	2020	—	—	—	—	—		Non-album singles
"My Power" (from Project Power)	2020	—	—	—	—	—		Non-album singles
"FWB"	2020	—	—	—	—	—		Once Upon a Time
"Too Much Sun in LA"	2021	—	—	—	—	—		Non-album single
"Requiem for a Dream"	2023	—	—	—	—	—		Samson: The Album
"Truth or Dare" (with Freddie Gibbs)	2023	—	—	—	—	—		Samson: The Album
"Demigod"	2023	—	—	—	—	—		Samson: The Album
"Places to Be" (with Fred Again and Anderson .Paak)	2024	10	51	43	27	35	ARIA: Platinum; RMNZ: Platinum	Ten Days

==== As featured artist ====
Title	Year	Peak chart positions	Album
Title	Year	US R&B Dig.	Album
"Coulda Told Me" (Rachel Crow featuring Chika)	2018	—	Non-album singles
"Sabotage" (JoJo featuring Chika)	2019	18	Non-album singles
"Chore" (Chelsea Peretti featuring Chika)	2020	—	Foam and Flotsam
"Can't Put It in the Hands of Fate" (Stevie Wonder featuring Rapsody, Cordae, Chika, and Busta Rhymes)	2020	—	Non-album single

=== Music videos ===
Title	Year	Director
"No Squares"	2019	Jack Piatt
"High Rises"	2019	Cierra "Sh00ter" Glaude
"Can't Explain It" (featuring Charlie Wilson)	2019	Top Shelf Jr., Chika

== Filmography ==
=== Film ===
Year	Title	Role	Notes
2020	Project Power	Akeela	
2023	Ladies First: A Story of Women in Hip-Hop	Herself	

Key
†	Denotes films that have not yet been released

=== Television ===
Year	Title	Role	Notes
2022	The Hair Tales	Herself	

== Awards and nominations ==
Organization	Year	Category	Nominated work	Result	Ref.
Grammy Awards	2021	Best New Artist	–	Nominated	
NAACP Image Awards	2021	Outstanding New Artist	"High Rises"	Nominated	
GLAAD Media Awards	2021	Outstanding Breakthrough Music Artist	Industry Games	Won	
