= Please Don't Cry =

2024 studio album by Rapsody

Studio album by Rapsody
- Released: May 17, 2024
- Genre: Hip-hop
- Length: 64:51
- Labels: Jamla; Roc Nation
- Producers: Ayo Awosika; Blk Odyssy; Marc Bridges; Joe Conner; Corbett; Lily Elise; Epikh Pro; Marlanna Evans; Eric G; Hit-Boy; Lonestarrmuzik; Jameil Aossey; Major Seven; Andre Mego; Brock Pollock; Rapsody; Markeith Reid; S1; Sir Tim; Sndtrak; Treehouz; Wu10

Rapsody chronology
Eve (2019)	Please Don't Cry (2024)	God Gotta Afro & Gold Hoops (2026)

Please Don't Cry is the fourth studio album by American rapper Rapsody. It was released on May 17, 2024, through the Jamla and Roc Nation labels.

== Background ==
After releasing her previous album, Eve, in 2019, Rapsody began to work on her next musical projects in March 2020. She describes herself as having begun "working on three albums at one time" during this period. Rapsody recounted that, early in the album's development, she struggled with motivation and questioned whether there would be an audience for her music; she told Vulture that those feelings created a mental block she needed to overcome in order to complete the album.

Throughout the development of Please Don't Cry, Rapsody wrote more than 350 songs, from which she selected 22 to appear on the project. In determining which tracks to include, Rapsody expressed that she wanted to prioritize more personal material so that listeners would best understand her:

I told myself that I haven't really introduced myself to people yet. And before I could do any other album, I want people to get to know me and know who I am first. [...] About the other two [albums in progress], I was like, "I can't put them out until I purge this and allow people to see me and let me get to know Marlanna outside of Rapsody."

Shortly after the album was released, Rapsody announced that she would support it with a tour of Europe and North America in September and October 2024.

== Content ==
Please Don't Cry is an introspective album on which Rapsody explores a variety of topics, such as "sexuality, identity, self-preservation, and the plight of Hip-Hop artistry". She has described it as "a love story with the reflection in the mirror". The album employs a framing device where Rapsody portrays herself as attending a therapy session; the therapist, voiced by Phylicia Rashad, appears on the opening track "She's Expecting You" and several subsequent occasions. The principal elements of the album's instrumentation have been identified as "warm bass, crisp percussion, heavenly background vocals, and light chords". It also features greater R&B influences than Rapsody's previous work.

On tracks such as "Look What You've Done", Rapsody criticizes media outlets that sought to praise her by deriding more sexually focused female rappers. The song "DND (It's Not Personal)", a track which discusses the value of solitude, samples Monica's "Don't Take It Personal" and has been compared to G-funk. On "Stand Tall", Rapsody reflects on facing public speculation about her sexuality. "3:AM" is a jazzy song that addresses the topic of romance, and features vocals from Erykah Badu. Rapsody has described the experience of collaborating with Badu as follows:

["3:AM" is] the one record I have enjoyed the most because it was a process, and getting to know [Badu] more and building a deeper friendship. [...] She taught me, just in that one song and interacting the way we did, that art can't be rushed; you take your time and really get what you want to say and how you want to say and live with it. So that was a beautiful experience. She really elevated that record.

"Loose Rocks" has an "airy" sound and features Rapsody discussing a relative's battle with dementia. "Never Enough" incorporates reggae elements, and "He Shot Me" reflects on police brutality. Lil Wayne provides a guest verse on the track "Raw". Rapsody has stated that she rewrote her own lyrics "like 27 times" after Wayne submitted his verse, and recalls how collaborating with Wayne inspired her to showcase her strongest lyricism:

Wayne is the only person that I've worked with that I rewrote my verse. And it wasn't even that I was trying to out-rap him. ... Before he got on it, I just approached it like, "Yo, I just want to do something that's fun that might be a little easier for somebody to learn." But when I got his verse back, it inspired me. I was like, "Yo, he ate this so much. I want to match that approach to the record." ... I wanted to match for the culture and make a really dope joint where two elite MCs are just being lyrical and loving hip-hop.

In contrast to the more reflective mood present on much of Please Don't Cry, "Raw" has been identified as a more "hard-hitting", lyrically driven track; similar descriptions have been applied to "Black Popstar" and "Asteroids". "Lonely Women" is a "playful" song that discusses masturbation; Its instrumentation is built on "watery synths". Rapsody has stated that her goal with "Lonely Women" was to emphasize the wide variety of ways in which one can discuss sexual topics, and to showcase her own preferred approach to the subject matter. The song "A Ballad for Homegirls" includes a feature from Baby Tate and reflects on the challenges of "yearning for an emotionally unavailable man".

Rapsody has given the following explanation for the meaning of the album title:

It's supposed to be ironic, right. It's Please Don't Cry, but the real message is please do cry. Allow yourself to be human, allow yourself to feel, to sit in your emotions, to grow from it. And think of all the reasons that we do cry. Of course, we cry when we're sad, but we cry when we're happy, too, and joyful. And we cry when we're in love. It's just about allowing yourself to really be imperfect and embracing the human that you are.

== Critical reception ==
Professional ratings
Review scores
Source	Rating
Clash	8/10
Pitchfork	8.1/10
RapReviews	9/10

Please Don't Cry received positive reviews from critics. Danilo Castro of HotNewHipHop stated that "listeners will be rewarded" for paying close attention to the album, and Robin Murray of Clash remarked that it "just might stand as [Rapsody's] most complete work yet". In particular, Rapsody's emotional openness received commendation: Gary Gerard Hamilton of the Associated Press described the album as "entering a new territory of unapologetic vulnerability", and Pitchfork's Stephen Kearse called it "a vivid affirmation of self and community". Sy Shackleford of RapReviews compared the emotional weight of the album to the TV series This Is Us. Gabriel Bras Nevares of HotNewHipHop praised the album as a soulful and compassionate work where "every piece lends a purpose" to the whole, though he also argued that the album occasionally "spins its own wheels in place thematically or takes too jarring and sharp of a turn off-road". Rapsody's performance achieved acclaim as well, with Kearse stating the opinion that she showcased "all the flows, cadences, and deliveries she's mastered" over the course of the album.

The album's production was also viewed favorably. Nevares felt that the prevailing mood of the production was "calm cohesion" that "highlight[ed] subtle instrumentation in ways that more complicated beats would overshadow". Kearse praised the "lush blends of R&B, gospel, reggae, and trap", and elsewhere compared its sonic palette to The Miseducation of Lauryn Hill and to Dungeon Family artists. Rapsody's divergences from this core sound received more mixed reviews. Castro felt that tracks like "Black Popstar" employed "hard-hitting instrumentals that liven things up", but Nevares criticized it as "trite trap drum sequencing". Critics also commented on the length of the album, but expressed that they generally found the material substantive enough to justify the runtime.

The guest artists on Please Don't Cry received praise as well. Erykah Badu was especially singled out for providing a "sensational" appearance on "3:AM", in which she was described as "capturing the spirit of grateful heartbreak". Nevares praised Lil Wayne's verse on "Raw" as "charismatic", but felt its mixing to be poor.

== Track listing ==
Credits adapted from Apple Music and Spotify

Please Don't Cry track listing
No.	Title	Writer(s)	Producer(s)	Length
1.	"She's Expecting You" (featuring Phylicia Rashad)	Marlanna Evans; Juwan Elcock; Chester Burnett	Rapsody; Blk Odyssy	1:08
2.	"Marlanna"	Elcock; Evans; Anthony Broussard	Blk Odyssy; Sndtrak	2:33
3.	"Asteroids" (with Hit-Boy)	Evans; Chauncey Hollis; Dustin James Corbett	Hit-Boy; Corbett	2:35
4.	"Look What You've Done"	Elcock; Evans; Alejandro Rios; Lara	Blk Odyssy	4:20
5.	"DND (It's Not Personal)" (featuring Bee-B)	Elcock; Evans; Brittany Chikyra Barber; Justin Martin; Quincy Jones III; Dallas Austin; Derrick Simmons; James Todd Smith; Jerry Davis; Willie Baker; George Clinton; Philippe Wynn	Blk Odyssy	2:35
6.	"Black Popstar" (featuring Dixson)	Evans; Jameil Aossey; Larry Griffin, Jr.; Stuart Lowery; Timothy German; Darius Dixson	S1; Epikh Pro; Aossey^{[a]}; Sir Tim^{[a]}	2:39
7.	"Stand Tall"	Evans	Eric Guerrero	2:09
8.	"That One Time"	Wyclef Jean; Rios; Corey Henry; Elcock; Evans	Blk Odyssy	3:13
9.	"3:AM" (featuring Erykah Badu)	Maurice Nichols; Erykah Badu; Marc Bridges; Christopher Wilkes; Evans; Griffin	S1; Lonestarrmuzik; JeMarcus Bridges; STLNDRMS^{[a]}	3:33
10.	"Loose Rocks" (featuring Alex Isley)	German; Alex Isley; Evans; Griffin	S1; Sir Tim	4:01
11.	"Diary of a Mad Bitch" (featuring Bibi Bourelly)	Bibi Bourelly; Evans; Griffin; Kelvin Wooten	S1; Wu10; Bibi Bourelly^{[v]}	3:23
12.	"Never Enough" (featuring Keznamdi and Nicole Bus)	Evans; Keznamdi McDonald; Omar Walker	Major Seven; Nicole Bus^{[c]}; Precious Wisely^{[c]}	3:51
13.	"He Shot Me"	Lara; Elcock; Rios; Evans; Bob Marley	Blk Odyssy	3:09
14.	"God's Light"	Evans; Jamar McNaughton; Matthew Louis Merisola; Daniel McKinnon; David Pimentel; Kelsey Gonzalez; Vicky Farewell; Eric Gabouer	Eric G	2:39
15.	"Back in My Bag"	Evans; Walker; Ebo Taylor	Major Seven	3:01
16.	"Niko's Interlude" (featuring Niko Brim)	Niko Brim	Sndtrak; Markeith Reid	1:04
17.	"Raw" (featuring Lil Wayne)	Brim; Evans; Dwayne Michael Carter, Jr.; Robert Diggs; Russell Jones; Griffin; Wooten	S1; Wu10	2:44
18.	"Lonely Women"	Elcock; Evans; Rios	Blk Odyssy; Tave^{[a]}	1:42
19.	"A Ballad for Homegirls" (featuring Baby Tate)	Lara; Elcock; Evans; Tate Farris; Steve Octave	Blk Odyssy; Tave^{[a]}	4:22
20.	"Please Don't Cry Interlude" (featuring Phylicia Rashad)	André Mego; Evans; Walker	André Mego; Marlanna Evans; Major Seven^{[a]}	2:01
21.	"Faith"	Lily Elise; Brock Pollock; Joe Conner; Rahel Phillips; Shaan Ramaprasad; Evans; Ayotunde Elizabeth Awosika; Walker; Jeremy Lawrence	Major Seven; Lily Elise; Treehouz; Brock Pollock; Joe Conner; Awosika	3:35
22.	"Forget Me Not" (featuring Amber Navran and Phylicia Rashad)	Amber Navran; Evans; Ciarán McDonald; Gabouer	Eric G	4:34
Total length:				64:51

Note

- ^{^[a]} indicates an additional producer
- ^{^[c]} indicates a co-producer
- ^{^[v]} indicates a vocal producer

== Personnel ==
Musicians

- Rapsody – vocals
- Phylicia Rashad – voice (tracks 1, 2, 22)
- Madison Brim – additional vocals (track 1)
- Juwan Elcock – bass (tracks 2, 4, 5, 8, 13, 19), additional vocals (13), keyboards (18)
- Alejandro Rios – guitar (tracks 2, 4, 5, 8, 13, 18)
- JeMarcus Bridges – keyboards (tracks 2, 9, 13); bass, horns (9)
- Tamae – additional vocals (track 2)
- Coleman – keyboards (track 2)
- Lara – additional vocals (tracks 4, 13, 19)
- Charlamagne Tha God – additional vocals (track 4)
- Christina Bell – strings (track 4)
- S1 – keyboards (tracks 6, 9, 10); programming, samples (6); drums, horns (9); additional vocals (10)
- Sir Tim – keyboards (tracks 6, 10), bass (10)
- Epikh Pro – drums (tracks 6, 10)
- Nigel – guitar (tracks 6)
- Jameil A. – keyboards (track 6)
- Christopher Patterson – additional vocals (track 7)
- Fenn O'Meally – additional vocals (track 7)
- Wyann Vaughn – additional vocals (track 7)
- Grace Sorensen – additional vocals (tracks 8, 19)
- Wyclef Jean – additional vocals (track 8)
- Art Hays – flute (track 8)
- Cory Henry – keyboards (track 8); Rhodes, synthesizer (19)
- Marlon Williams – guitar (tracks 9–11, 14)
- Terrace Martin – keyboards (tracks 9, 10, 17); bass, horns (9)
- Lonestarrmuzik – drums (track 9)
- Amber Navran – flute (track 9)
- Clemerdale Joyner – additional vocals (track 10)
- Rjtheweirdo – additional vocals (track 10)
- Nicole Bus – additional vocals (track 12)
- Pirate Biker – additional vocals (track 12)
- Adrian "Jerks" Henry – bass (track 12)
- Harry Edohoukwa – additional vocals (track 13)
- Eric G – additional vocals, keyboards (track 14)
- Robert Glasper – keyboards (track 17)
- Tave – bass, guitar (track 19)
- Brandan Smith – keyboards (track 19)
- Sebastian Mikael – additional vocals (track 20)
- Shaan Ramaprasad – strings (tracks 20, 21)
- Samuel "Muzikman" Williams – organ, piano (track 21)
- Ayo Awosika – additional vocals (track 21)
- Rahel Phillips – additional vocals (track 21)
- Marcaelis Sanders – bass (track 21)
- Brody Simpson – drums (track 21)

Technical

- Colin Leonard – mastering
- Leslie Brathwaite – mixing
- Victor Gaspar – engineering (tracks 1, 2, 4, 5, 8, 13, 16, 18, 19, 22), additional engineering (3, 6, 7, 11, 14, 17)
- Sam Valentine – engineering (tracks 1, 2, 15, 22)
- Huynh Nguyen – engineering (track 2)
- Rapsody – engineering (tracks 3, 6, 7, 10–12, 14, 15, 17, 22), vocal arrangement (1, 2, 4–6, 8–14, 16–22)
- Rich Niles – engineering (tracks 5, 9, 21)
- Dixson – engineering, vocal arrangement (track 6)
- S1 – engineering (tracks 9–11, 14)
- Alex Isley – engineering, vocal arrangement (track 10)
- Nathanael Graham – engineering (track 11)
- Gregory "Phace" Fils-Aimé – engineering (tracks 12, 15, 20, 21)
- Manny Galvez – engineering (track 17)
- Hector "Tor" Fernandez – engineering (track 19)
- Phylicia Rashad – engineering (track 20), vocal arrangement (20, 22)
- Stephen "Stevenkeyz" Oyeniran – engineering (track 21)
- Amber Navran – engineering (track 22)
- Major Seven – additional engineering (tracks 12, 15, 21)
- Eric Guerrero – engineering assistance
- Gili Portal – engineering assistance (track 11)
- Brittany B – vocal arrangement (track 5)
- Erykah Badu – vocal arrangement (track 9)
- Bibi Bourelly – vocal arrangement (track 11)
- Keznamdi McDonald – vocal arrangement (track 12)
- Niko Brim – vocal arrangement (track 16)
- Lil Wayne – vocal arrangement (track 17)
- Baby Tate – vocal arrangement (track 19)
- Rahel Phillips – vocal arrangement (track 21)
- BruceBeats – horn arrangement (track 12)
