= On the Come Up (soundtrack) =

2022 soundtrack album

On the Come Up (Music from the Motion Picture)

Soundtrack album by Various artists
- Released: September 23, 2022
- Genres: Pop; rap; hip hop
- Length: 33:53
- Label: Paramount Music
- Producer: Rapsody, Bobby Francis, Larrance "Rance" Dopson
- Compiler: Sanaa Lathan

Singles from On the Come Up (Music from the Motion Picture)
- 1. "On the Come Up" Released: September 16, 2022; 2. "Chopin's Waltz" Released: September 19, 2022

On the Come Up (Music from the Motion Picture) is the soundtrack album accompanying the 2022 film of the same name. The album was released on September 23, 2022, by Paramount Music and featured 12 tracks, which were sung by Jamila C. Gray, Lil Yachty and Rapsody, who executive produced the soundtrack with 1500 or Nothin' Bobby Francis and Larrance "Rance" Dopson.

== Background ==
Sanaa Lathan, the film's director, roped in Bobby Francis and Larrance "Rance" Dopson from the 1500 or Nothin' to executive produce the soundtrack. Also joining the team, were North Carolina–based rapper Rapsody, who also recorded and contributed for few of the tracks and wrote all the rhymes of the film. Rapsody shared her experience on working on the film, saying "I love film and to tie film and music together when I have the opportunity. I definitely was excited when they brought me on board, but it was dope. Sanaa opened the door and she allowed me to learn a lot about filmmaking, the process, and she trusted my ear. We worked well together along with Larrance Dopson in just creating something dope, musically."

Jamila C. Gray, the film's protagonist, closely worked with Rapsody to master cadence, breath control and to understand the nuances of rap and pop music, Gray received a playlist from Rapsody, that has classic hip-hop tunes featuring artists like Jay-Z, Lauryn Hill, Mobb Deep and Ms. Jade. She also coached Gray during the battle music sequences, which were considered the film's intense moments. For the climactic battle sequence with Infamous Millz (Lil Yachty), Gray watched YouTube clips of Tori Doe, to practice wordplay, and struck by one of her vicious battles with her co-rapper. Gray said "Watching that battle really helped me define the character of Bri in that moment. It was a moment of release, but it's also a moment of ownership: I'm taking my power back. Nobody can take my power away from me."

Rapsody recorded the title track with Gray and Lady London. While writing the track, she also carefully kept the original words and punchlines from Thomas' novel. The track was supposed to be sounded as an anthem, but also underscores Bri's witticism and command of language. She said "It was important to Sanaa to create some moments for fans to see the essence of the rhymes in the book come to life. Our job was to build on what that music sounded like and incorporate those words into a cadence and flow for Jamila to perform."

== Release ==
On the Come Up (Music from the Motion Picture) was promoted by two singles—the title track was released on September 16, 2022, and "Chopin Waltz", a solo piano track by Chloe Flower was released on September 19, 2022. Paramount Music released the soundtrack officially on September 23.

== Track listing ==
No.	Title	Artist(s)	Length
1.	"On the Come Up"	Lady London; Rapsody; Jamila C. Gray	2:57
2.	"That's How We Ball"	Lil Yachty	2:47
3.	"Runnin' Wild"	GQ	3:15
4.	"Swaggerific"	Justin Martin	1:50
5.	"M Dot Freestyle"	GaTa	1:36
6.	"Milez vs. Bri"	Martin; Gray	3:14
7.	"Miss Tique vs. Bri"	London; Gray	2:45
8.	"Round 1: Bri vs. Infamous Millz"	Gray; Yachty	3:43
9.	"Round 2: Bri vs. Infamous Millz"	Gray; Yachty	2:08
10.	"Bri-LLIANT"	Gray	2:17
11.	"See It Clear"	Rapsody; SVRCINA	3:01
12.	"On the Come Up (Film Version)"	Gray	2:40
13.	"Chopin's Waltz"	Chloe Flower	1:40
Total length:			33:53

== Score album ==
On the Come Up (Original Score)

Film score by Daniel Wohl
- Released: October 21, 2022
- Recorded: 2022
- Genre: Film score
- Length: 24:28
- Label: Paramount Music
- Producer: Daniel Wohl

Daniel Wohl chronology
The Thief Collector (2022)	On the Come Up (2022)	Mickey: The Story of a Mouse (2022)

Daniel Wohl's score album was released under the title On the Come Up (Original Score) on October 21, 2022 by Paramount Music.

No.	Title	Length
1.	"Floating"	2:37
2.	"At One Time"	1:23
3.	"Child"	2:28
4.	"Retaliation"	0:44
5.	"Quitting"	1:03
6.	"One Hit Wonder"	2:10
7.	"Battle Choke"	0:51
8.	"Another Morning"	1:23
9.	"Forgiveness"	1:29
10.	"Like Magic"	1:12
11.	"Held at Gunpoint"	1:48
12.	"Speaking Terms"	1:17
13.	"Pool Kiss"	1:44
14.	"Skittles"	1:35
15.	"Thrown to the Ground"	1:35
16.	"Brilliant"	1:09
Total length:		24:28
