= Can't Put It in the Hands of Fate =

2020 single by Stevie Wonder featuring Rapsody, Cordae, Chika, Busta Rhymes

Single by Stevie Wonder featuring Rapsody, Cordae, Chika, Busta Rhymes
- Released: October 13, 2020
- Genre: Hip-hop; funk
- Length: 6:42
- Label: So What the Fuss; Republic
- Songwriter: Stevie Wonder
- Producer: Stevie Wonder

Stevie Wonder singles chronology
"Where Is Our Love Song" (2020)	"Can't Put It in the Hands of Fate" (2020)	"Don't Make Me Wait Too Long" (2023)

Rapsody singles chronology
"Air & Water Interlude" (2020)	"Cant Put It In The Hands Of Fate" (2020)	"Deep End (Remix)" (2020)

Cordae singles chronology
"Gifted" (2020)	"Cant Put It In The Hands Of Fate" (2020)	"Soda" (2020)

Chika singles chronology
"My Power" (2020)	"Cant Put It In The Hands Of Fate" (2020)	"FWB" (2020)

Busta Rhymes singles chronology
"Yuuuu" (2020)	"Cant Put It In The Hands Of Fate" (2020)	"Nutshell Pt. 2" (2021)

Audio video
- "Can't Put It in the Hands of Fate" on YouTube

"Can't Put It in the Hands of Fate" is a song by American singer-songwriter Stevie Wonder, featuring American rappers Rapsody, Chika, Cordae and Busta Rhymes. Released on October 13, 2020, it is a funk track with lyrics addressing institutional racism, and associated issues such as police brutality and the Black Lives Matter movement.

Released in a live-streamed press conference alongside "Where Is Our Love Song", this is Stevie Wonder's first single since "Faith" in 2016, and since he announced a temporary hiatus from performing in 2019 in order to undergo a kidney transplant. In addition, this is the first music he has not released through Motown, marking the end to his career-long association with the record label in favour of his new label, So What the Fuss Music, distributed through Republic Records. Both labels are currently part of the Universal Music Group.

Calling it "a response to systemic racism", Wonder said the song speaks in a time when "Not just Black people or people of colour but young people everywhere are going, 'This is not acceptable.' Change is right now". Busta Rhymes rap references the aftermath of the murder of George Floyd and the killing of Breonna Taylor.

== Personnel ==
- Stevie Wonder – main artist, lyrics, vocals, keyboards, harmonica, choir arranger, composer, producer
- Busta Rhymes – featured artist
- Rapsody – featured artist
- Cordae – featured artist
- Chika – featured artist
- Allison Semmes – backing vocals
- Camille Grigsby – backing vocals
- Cory Rooney – backing vocals
- George Young – backing vocals
- Kimberly Brewer – backing vocals
- Phylicia Hill – backing vocals
- Traci Nelson – backing vocals
- Will Wheaton – backing vocals
- Nathan Watts – bass
- Munyungo Jackson – percussion
- Stanley Randolph – drums
- Lamar Mitchell – programming
- Femi Jiya – recording
- Cristian F. Perez – engineering
- Neal Pogue – mixing
- David Avetisian – assistant mixing
- Mike Bozzi – mastering
