= Capella Grey =

American singer, songwriter, rapper and record producer (born 1995)

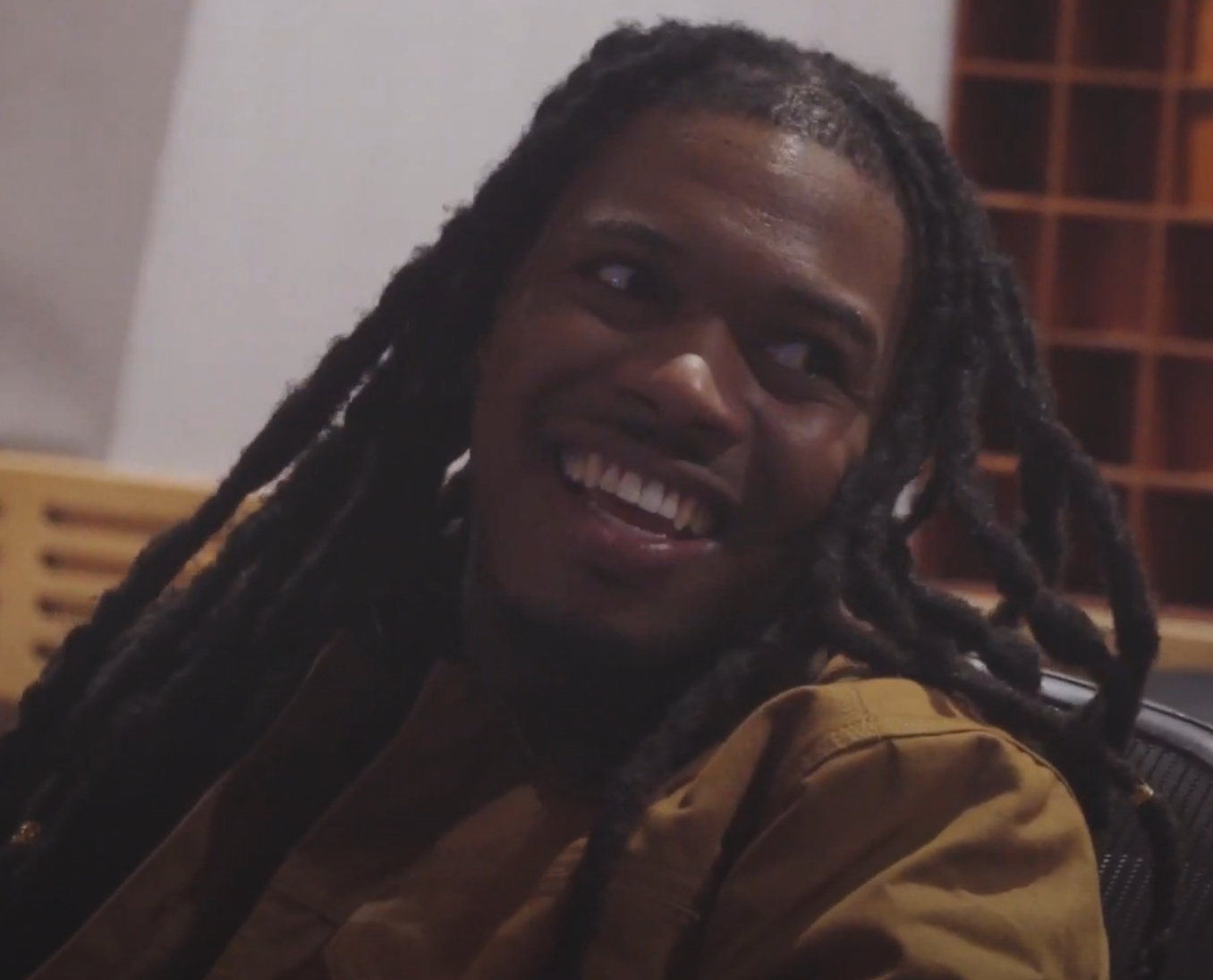
- Capella Grey in 2021

Background information
- Also known as: The Mayor
- Born: Curtis Anthony Jackson II; August 2, 1995 (age 31); New Rochelle, New York, US
- Origin: The Bronx, New York, US; Mount Vernon, New York, US
- Genres: R&B; dancehall; hip hop
- Occupations: Singer; songwriter; record producer
- Instruments: Piano; guitar; drums; bass guitar; saxophone
- Years active: 2016–present
- Labels: Allepac the Family; 10K Projects (former); Capitol (former)

Curtis Anthony Jackson II (born August 2, 1995), known professionally as Capella Grey, is an American singer, songwriter and record producer from the Bronx, New York. He is the founder of Allepac the Family and released two songwriter mixtapes in 2020 and received widespread recognition in 2021 with his breakout single "Gyalis". His debut album, Vibe Responsibly, Vol. 1 was released on June 21, 2024, after signing a record deal with 10K Projects.

== Early life ==
Curtis Jackson II was born on August 2, 1995, in New Rochelle, New York. He grew up in a Jamaican family and started playing instruments at a young age, learning how to play music from church. He developed his musical career in Mount Vernon, New York after graduating high school.

== Musical career ==
=== 2016–2020: Career beginnings and early mixtapes ===
Capella Grey started his musical career writing and producing for other artists, including "Love You Better" by King Combs featuring Chris Brown. He signed an R&B girl group called Rèign to Allepac Records, and wrote and produced their debut album released in 2019. On January 8, 2020, he released his debut mixtape Yea Nah I'm Out, followed by his second mixtape The QuaranTape Vibe 1.

=== 2021–2022: "Gyalis" and breakthrough ===
On January 4, 2021, he released the single "Gyalis", which samples Juvenile's "Back That Azz Up". The song went viral in New York and on social media platforms, spawning unofficial remixes from A Boogie wit da Hoodie, Kranium, Tory Lanez, Angel and Haile, among others. The song reached number 10 on the Billboard Hot R&B/Hip-Hop Songs chart, and was called the "song of the summer" by multiple publications. The official remix was released on October 1, 2021, featuring Popcaan and Chris Brown. Later that month on October 15, 2021, Capella was featured on fellow New York rapper DreamDoll‘s single ‘You Know My Body’, the song was a hit and received heavy radio play in New York. He signed with Capitol in 2021, saying they are "not trying to change me as an artist to meet the standards or expectations of music now, which is why I went with them." He also said, "they are a great team of record breakers and I am excited to work with them."

On December 17, 2021, Capella Grey released the single "Talk Nice". On March 18, 2022, he released the single "Confujawn" with Nija. On May 6, he released the music video for "Sas Crise" featuring Alayzha Sky and Ghost, and directed by Mikey Scho. On June 10, Capella Grey released the single "OT" featuring Ty Dolla Sign.

He appeared on Chris Brown's album Breezy, on the song "Till The Wheels Fall Off" featuring Lil Durk. On July 1, he was featured on DJ Drama's single "Forever" featuring Fabolous, Benny the Butcher, and Jim Jones. Capella Grey was the opening act for Joey Badass on a 20-date summer concert tour, the 1999–2000 Tour. On July 22, he also featured on the song "Welcome Back" with Joey Badass and Chris Brown, on the album 2000.

=== 2023–present: Vibe Responsibly, Vol. 1 ===
In January 2023, Capella Grey announced the tentative release date for his debut album for January 27 which was later delayed. On July 17, 2023, Capella Grey released the EP Here, Damn as a teaser and placeholder before his debut. In October 2023, he released two singles independently, "How I Am" and "Baechester". On December 18, he released his first Holiday album titled Nah It’s Brick: A Holiday Vibe.

In May 2024, Capella Grey announced the release date for his anticipated debut album. On June 11, he released the single "Strings" with Fivio Foreign and French Montana under his new licensing deal with 10K Projects. On June 21, he released his debut album Vibe Responsibly, Vol. 1 including features from Jaewon, Young M.A, Jacquees, Cash Cobain, Jada Kingdom, DreamDoll, Journey Montana, Tone Stith, Tory Lanez and Skillibeng, among others.

== Artistry ==
Capella Grey described his musical style as "singing at the tempo of a rapper", and cited Kranium, Ty Dolla Sign, Charlie Wilson, Jodeci, Diddy, 50 Cent, and Dipset as his musical influences.

== Allepac the Family ==
Allepac the Family
- Parent company: Warner Music Group
- Founded: 2016
- Founder: Capella Grey
- Status: Active
- Distributor: 10K Projects Atlantic Records
- Genre: R&B; dancehall; hip hop
- Location: New York City, U.S.

Allepac the Family ("Capella" spelled backwards) is an American record label based in New York City founded by Capella Grey. He calls the genre of the label's music "RNBOP", which was coined by his frequent collaborator BBearded.

== Discography ==
=== Albums ===
Title	Album details
Vibe Responsibly, Vol. 1	Released: June 21, 2024; Label: Allepac the Family, 10K Projects; Format: Digital download, streaming

=== Extended plays ===
Title	Album details
HERE, damn.	Released: July 16, 2023; Label: Allepac the Family; Format: Digital download, streaming
Nah, It's Brick: A Holiday Vibe	Released: December 18, 2023; Label: Allepac the Family; Format: Digital download, streaming
Vibe Responsibly: The Afties	Released: November 8, 2024; Label: Allepac the Family, 10K Projects; Format: Digital download, streaming

=== Mixtapes ===
Title	Album details
Yea Nah I'm Out	Released: January 8, 2020; Label: Allepac the Family; Format: Digital download, streaming
The QuaranTape Vibe 1.	Released: April 17, 2020; Label: Allepac the Family; Format: Digital download, streaming
u miss me yet?	Released: February 12, 2025; Label: Allepac the Family, 10K Projects; Format: Digital download, streaming

=== Singles ===
==== As lead artist ====
Title	Year	Peak chart positions					Certifications	Album
Title	Year	US	US R&B /HH	CAN	UK	UK R&B	Certifications	Album
"One More Chance"	2020	—	—	—	—	—		Vibe Responsibly Vol. 1
"Sas Crise" (featuring Alayzha Sky and Ghost)	2020	—	—	—	—	—		Non-album single
"Gyalis"	2021	38	10	84	65	26	RIAA: Platinum; BPI: Silver	Non-album single
"Gyalis (Remix)" (featuring Chris Brown and Popcaan)	2021	—	—	—	—	—		Non-album single
"Talk Nice"	2021	—	—	—	—	—		Non-album single
"Confujawn" (with Nija)	2022	—	—	—	—	—		Non-album single
"OT" (with Ty Dolla $ign)	2022	—	—	—	—	—		Non-album single
"How I Am"	2023	—	—	—	—	—		Vibe Responsibly Vol. 1
"Baechester"	2023	—	—	—	—	—		Vibe Responsibly Vol. 1
"Strings" (with Fivio Foreign & French Montana)	2024	—	—	—	—	—		Vibe Responsibly Vol. 1
"I'm Weak"	2024	—	—	—	—	—		Vibe Responsibly: The Afties

==== As featured artist ====
List of singles as a featured artist, showing year released and album name
Title	Year	Peak chart positions				Album
Title	Year	US	US R&B /HH	CAN	NZ Hot	Album
"Bestie" (Culture Jam featuring A Boogie wit da Hoodie & Capella Grey)	2021	—	—	—	—	Kawhi Leonard Presents: Culture Jam (Vol. 1)
"You know My Body" (DreamDoll featuring Capella Grey)	2021	—	—	—	—	Life in Plastic 3: The Finale
"Seduce" (Russ featuring Capella Grey & Tamae)	2021	— (Note: "Seduce" did not enter the Billboard Hot 100, but peaked at number 20 on the Bubbling Under Hot 100 chart.)	10	79	2	Non-album single
"Forever" (DJ Drama featuring Fabolous, Benny the Butcher, Jim Jones & Capella Grey)	2022	—	—	—	—	I'm Really Like That
"Werk" (Karlie Redd featuring Spice & Capella Grey)	2022	—	—	—	—	Non-album single
"Round & Round" (Kai Ca$h featuring Capella Grey)	2022	—	—	—	—	Non-album single
"Impatient" (Neila featuring Capella Grey)	2023	—	—	—	—	Bite Me
"Don't Vibe And Tell" (Red Café featuring Capella Grey & Fabolous)	2023	—	—	—	—	Non-album single
"Having My Way" (ShaqnLivin featuring Capella Grey)	2023	—	—	—	—	Non-album single
"Skin Out" (Monroe X featuring CJ & Capella Grey)	2023	—	—	—	—	Non-album single
"Facetime" (Byrd Gang & Jim Jones featuring Capella Grey, Dyce Payso & DramaB2R)	2023	—	—	—	—	Non-album single
"Real Woman" (Monique The Star featuring Capella Grey)	2024	—	—	—	—	Soft Girl Era
"Addicted" (Jaylah Oshea featuring Capella Grey)	2026	—	—	—	—	Non-album single

=== Other charted songs ===
Title	Year	Peak chart positions		Album
Title	Year	NZ Hot	UK	Album
"Till The Wheels Fall Off" (Chris Brown featuring Lil Durk & Capella Grey)	2022	8	66	Breezy

=== Guest appearances ===
List of non-single guest appearances, with other performing artists, showing year released and album name
Title	Year	Other artist(s)	Album
"Never Mind"	2016	Niko	—N/a
"City of Mine"	2016	DJ Myte, TheMoneyManDot, MoneyGangDeeDee, Quentin Gilmore, S.O, T-Mac	4 Square Peace Project
"Nostalgia"	2016	Spades Saratoga, ManFromDaVideo, PlayBoiiTwan, Jayy	4 Square Peace Project
"Black & Blue"	2016	Ella Avolu, Quentin Gilmore, Topik, Deputy Commissioner Anthony Mitchell	4 Square Peace Project
"Getaway ♂"	2016	Dre Dot, Moriece, Y.A.C (Young and Comfortable), Chris Denim	4 Square Peace Project
"Be The Change"	2016	Carson Stapleton, Darnella Fountain, Dre Dot, Franceska Marie, Chris Denim, Devyn, Sals, Kaveh	4 Square Peace Project
"Our Ting"	2016	Quentin Gilmore	—N/a
"Up To You / Away"	2016	Brandon Brown	—N/a
"Vibe Right"	2018	DJ Kanai, Haddy Hadd	—N/a
"Like I Do"	2019	Branford	—N/a
"Up On Time"	2020	Earl Young, 40 Kash	—N/a
"Mutual"	2020	Yungin' Miyagi	Back From That Fall Off
"Kittylude, Pt. 2"	2020	MoneyGangDeeDee	Dee Dee F. Baby
"Ari's Interlude Pt. 5"	2020	Tony Smeezy, Branford	Fuck Tony Smeezy
"Don't Have Time (Remix)"	2020	Xotica	—N/a
"Again & Again"	2020	31sbillz, Jayy B, 31stdre	Trap Luv
"Say Less, Do More"	2020	Chubbs Guapo, Sbam Khi	Journal Entries
"Painful Silence"	2020	Haddy Racks	—N/a
"1hunnid (Remix)"	2021	Rico Tarantino, Jdhane, Ryan Ramirez	Clarity
"Outside"	2021	Hannibal	—N/a
"Gyalis Summer"	2021	Yung Gemini	—N/a
"Mid Night Drive"	2021	Khaleel Rei	The Other Side
"Too Late"	2021	Jdhane	—N/a
"Driver"	2021	WhyThree	Balloon Boy
"Still My Baby"	2021	Quentin Gilmore, MoneyGangDeeDee	—N/a
"Find My Way 2 U"	2021	Rayven M.	—N/a
"Facetime"	2021	Queenferrari	—N/a
"Let Me Know"	2021	Rush33	—N/a
"Me Vs You"	2022	PJ tha Balla	—N/a
"Frontin For The Gram"	2022	Haddy Racks	Trench Talk
"Whatever On Whatever"	2022	Zae France	—N/a
"When I Call You"	2022	Su'Lan	—N/a
"Outside"	2022	ViddyOnDaBeat	—N/a
"King of the City"	2022	Lobby Boyz, Jim Jones, Maino	The Lobby Boyz
"Welcome Back"	2022	Joey Badass, Chris Brown	2000
"Same Gang"	2022	DJ Big Skipp, Mr.Chicken	—N/a
"Cruise Control"	2022	Young Devyn	Baby Goat 2
"You Be Ight"	2022	Loopy Ferrell, Sada James	Long Story Short
"Run It Up"	2022	Busta Rhymes	The Fuse Is Lit
"What She Wants"	2023	DJ E-STYLEZ, Rico Rozay	—N/a
"Selfish"	2023	JR JustReal, Mally Stakz	—N/a
"Badly"	2023	Jadda Ann	—N/a
"Talk that Talk"	2023	Alder Motta	—N/a
"Te Quiero A Ti"	2023	Anabel Itoha	—N/a
"Stranger"	2023	Ryan Witherspoon	—N/a
"Act Like You Know"	2023	Lady London	S.O.U.L.

== Writing discography ==
List of non-performed songs as writer, showing performing artists, year released and album name
Title	Year	Artist(s)	Album
"Love You Better"	2018	King Combs, Chris Brown	Non-album single
"Everything (Intro)"	2019	Rèign	Ii, Say That
"CLA"	2019	Rèign, DJ Myte, Jazzi Corleone	Ii, Say That
"Want Me"	2019	Rèign	Ii, Say That
"Girlfriend"	2019	Rèign	Ii, Say That
"Draggin' It"	2019	Rèign, JusQuinn	Ii, Say That
"Are You Dumb"	2019	Rèign, Kai Ca$h, Niko Brim	Ii, Say That
"Chances"	2019	Rèign	Ii, Say That
"Mad Face"	2019	Rèign, Lady London	Ii, Say That
"Dyckman"	2019	Rèign, Terrele Rose	Ii, Say That
"G's Joint (Interlude)"	2019	Rèign	Ii, Say That
"Done"	2019	Rèign	Ii, Say That
"Don't Tempt Me"	2019	Rèign	Ii, Say That
"One More"	2019	Rèign	Ii, Say That
"Reasons"	2019	Rèign	Ii, Say That
"Intro"	2020	Tierra B.	Tierra B.
"Toxic"	2020	Miriam Sintim	—N/a
"Perfect Girl"	2020	Karyl	—N/a
"Incoming Call"	2021	Khaleel Rei	—N/a

== Production discography ==
List of songs as producer or co-producer, showing year released, performing artists and album name
Title	Year	Artist(s)	Album
"Anything Like Your Mother"	2016	Capella Grey	—N/a
"Junior's Interlude"	2016	Wilbert "Busta" Francis	4 Square Peace Project
"City of Mine"	2016	DJ Myte, Capella Grey, TheMoneyManDot, MoneyGangDeeDee, Quentin Gilmore, S.O, T-Mac	4 Square Peace Project
"Nostalgia"	2016	Spades Saratoga, ManFromDaVideo, PlayBoiiTwan, Capella Grey, Jayy	4 Square Peace Project
"Getaway ♀"	2016	Màz, MoneyGangDeeDee, Lyph, Omega, Sals, Slayla	4 Square Peace Project
"Incredible"	2016	Quentin Gilmore, Màz, TheMoneyManDot, MoneyGangDeeDee, JodyJo	4 Square Peace Project
"Getaway ♂"	2016	Dre Dot, Moriece, Y.A.C (Young and Comfortable), Capella Grey, Chris Denim	4 Square Peace Project
"Be The Change"	2016	Carson Stapleton, Darnella Fountain, Dre Dot, Franceska Marie, Chris Denim, Devyn, Sals, Capella Grey, Kaveh	4 Square Peace Project
"Like I Do"	2019	Branford, Capella Grey	—N/a
"CLA"	2019	Rèign, DJ Myte, Jazzi Corleone	Ii, Say That
"Want Me"	2019	Rèign	Ii, Say That
"Girlfriend"	2019	Rèign	Ii, Say That
"Draggin' It"	2019	Rèign, JusQuinn	Ii, Say That
"Are You Dumb"	2019	Rèign, Kai Ca$h, Niko Brim	Ii, Say That
"Chances"	2019	Rèign	Ii, Say That
"Mad Face"	2019	Rèign, Lady London	Ii, Say That
"2 Fif"	2019	Rèign, DJ Kanai	Ii, Say That
"Dyckman"	2019	Rèign, Terrele Rose	Ii, Say That
"Done"	2019	Rèign	Ii, Say That
"Reasons"	2019	Rèign	Ii, Say That
"Flexx"	2019	Amirahle	—N/a
"Favorite Girl"	2020	Capella Grey, JusQuinn	Yea Nah I'm Out
"Body!"	2020	Capella Grey	Yea Nah I'm Out
"Boyz2Us"	2020	Capella Grey, Playboiitwan, DrewSoWavy	Yea Nah I'm Out
"Breathe (nfs)"	2020	Capella Grey	Yea Nah I'm Out
"Run The City"	2020	Capella Grey, The Frvternity	Yea Nah I'm Out
"Buzz Me In"	2020	Capella Grey	Yea Nah I'm Out
"Here She Go"	2020	Capella Grey	Yea Nah I'm Out
"Soon Come"	2020	Capella Grey, Iman, JusQuinn	Yea Nah I'm Out
"As You Should"	2020	Capella Grey, JusQuinn	Yea Nah I'm Out
"Together"	2020	Capella Grey, Timeless	Yea Nah I'm Out
"Word?"	2020	Capella Grey, Timeless	Yea Nah I'm Out
"Unappreciated"	2020	Capella Grey	Yea Nah I'm Out
"Bum"	2020	Capella Grey, Nick Barnz, ViddyOnDaBeat, Bsmnt Boy	Yea Nah I'm Out
"WTW"	2020	Capella Grey, JusQuinn, Alayzha Sky	The QuaranTape Vibe 1.
"Dashout"	2020	Capella Grey, Father Z	The QuaranTape Vibe 1.
"Boffum"	2020	Capella Grey, Quentin Gilmore, JusQuinn	The QuaranTape Vibe 1.
"So.. Slide"	2020	Capella Grey, Bsmnt Boy, Brandon Brown	The QuaranTape Vibe 1.
"Trues"	2020	Capella Grey, AO, Spades Saratoga	The QuaranTape Vibe 1.
"One More Chance"	2020	Capella Grey	—N/a
"Gyalis" (Solo or Remix)	2021	Capella Grey, Chris Brown, Popcaan	—N/a
"Sas Crise"	2021	Capella Grey, Alayzha Sky, Ghost	—N/a
"Toxic"	2021	Branford	—N/a
"LIPO (Intro)"	2023	Capella Grey	HERE, damn.
"Roll Up Again"	2023	Capella Grey	HERE, damn.
"1st Last"	2023	Capella Grey	HERE, damn.
"Sun Goes Down"	2023	Capella Grey	HERE, damn.
"Waiting On"	2023	Capella Grey	HERE, damn.
"Cozy"	2023	Capella Grey, Koniko Knight	Nah, It's Brick: A Holiday Vibe
"Come My Way"	2023	Capella Grey, Lady London	Nah, It's Brick: A Holiday Vibe
"Ultimate Gift"	2023	Capella Grey, Branford, Koniko Knight	Nah, It's Brick: A Holiday Vibe
"Store Run"	2023	Capella Grey, DreamDoll, Jaewon	Nah, It's Brick: A Holiday Vibe
"Not Like Mine"	2023	Capella Grey, Melii, Quentin Gilmore	Nah, It's Brick: A Holiday Vibe
"Black Sheep"	2023	Capella Grey	Nah, It's Brick: A Holiday Vibe
"Wavy New Years"	2023	Capella Grey, Melii, Mally Staks, Charliee Cole	Nah, It's Brick: A Holiday Vibe
"All I Want"	2023	Capella Grey, Ghost, Ryan Witherspoon, Koniko Knight	Nah, It's Brick: A Holiday Vibe
"BAECHESTER"	2024	Capella Grey	Vibe Responsibly, Vol. 1
"UCU"	2024	Capella Grey	Vibe Responsibly, Vol. 1
"Activate"	2024	Capella Grey	Vibe Responsibly, Vol. 1
"NOW THIS"	2024	Capella Grey, Cash Cobain	Vibe Responsibly, Vol. 1
"ANTICS!"	2024	Capella Grey	Vibe Responsibly, Vol. 1
"One More Whine"	2024	Capella Grey	Vibe Responsibly, Vol. 1
"Typa Girl"	2024	Capella Grey	Vibe Responsibly, Vol. 1
"One More Chance"	2024	Capella Grey	Vibe Responsibly, Vol. 1
"Bougie"	2024	Capella Grey, Jada Kingdom, Journey Montana, DreamDoll	Vibe Responsibly, Vol. 1
"How I Am"	2024	Capella Grey	Vibe Responsibly, Vol. 1
"Say Dat (interlude)"	2024	Capella Grey	Vibe Responsibly, Vol. 1
"Jodeci"	2024	Capella Grey, J.I the Prince of N.Y	Vibe Responsibly, Vol. 1
"Say Dat (interlude)"	2024	Capella Grey	Vibe Responsibly, Vol. 1
"My Bop"	2024	Capella Grey	Vibe Responsibly, Vol. 1
"Strings"	2024	Capella Grey, French Montana, Fivio Foreign	Vibe Responsibly, Vol. 1
"Whole Team"	2024	Capella Grey, Tory Lanez	Vibe Responsibly, Vol. 1
"MONEY PULL UP"	2024	Capella Grey, Skillibeng, MarriDon	Vibe Responsibly, Vol. 1
"Song About Me"	2024	Capella Grey	Vibe Responsibly, Vol. 1
"we out"	2024	Capella Grey, Jaewon	Vibe Responsibly: The Afties
"make it hot, Pt. 2"	2024	Capella Grey	Vibe Responsibly: The Afties
"im weak."	2024	Capella Grey	Vibe Responsibly: The Afties
"1st Last, Pt. 2"	2024	Capella Grey	Vibe Responsibly: The Afties
"good karma"	2024	Capella Grey, MarriDon, Father Z	Vibe Responsibly: The Afties
"boffum, Pt. 2"	2024	Capella Grey	Vibe Responsibly: The Afties
"miles from the palace (skit)"	2024	Capella Grey	Vibe Responsibly: The Afties
"backseat"	2024	Capella Grey	Vibe Responsibly: The Afties

== Filmography ==
=== Film and television ===
Year	Title	Role	Notes
2021–22	A Lot Going On	Himself	Documentary series, 10 episodes

=== Music videos ===
==== As lead artist ====
List of music videos as lead artist, showing year released and director(s)
Title	Year	Director(s)
"Gyalis"	2021	Brennan Rowe
"Talk Nice"	2021	Oliver Shore
"Whatever on Whatever" (Capella Grey & Zae France)	2022	Vina Love
"Confujawn" (featuring Nija)	2022	Cam Busby
"Sas Crise"	2022	Mikey Scho
"OT" (featuring Ty Dolla $ign)	2022	—N/a
"Gyalibans (Talibans PellaMix)"	2022	Foday Films
"How I Am"	2022	Gambino
"Baechester"	2022	Jack Trudes
"Water (PellaMix)"	2022	Jack Trudes

==== As featured artist ====
List of music videos as lead artist, showing year released and director(s)
Title	Year	Director(s)
"Up On Time" (Earl Young featuring 40 Kash & Capella Grey)	2020	IHateKngSol
"Too Late" (J Dhane featuring Capella Grey)	2021	Gambino
"Bestie" (Culture Jam featuring A Boogie wit da Hoodie & Capella Grey)	2021	Rook
"Find My Way 2 U" (Rayven M. featuring Capella Grey)	2021	Whoa, Rico & Jay Visuals
"You know My Body" (DreamDoll featuring Capella Grey)	2021	Sara Lacombe
"Driver" (WhyThree featuring Capella Grey)	2021	Controverse
"Seduce" (Russ featuring Capella Grey & Tamae)	2021	Logan Fields & Juan Felipe Zuleta
"Me Vs You" (PJ Tha Balla featuring Capella Grey)	2022	Benji Filmz & Launch Team
"Forever" (DJ Drama featuring Fabolous, Benny the Butcher, Jim Jones & Capella Grey)	2022	Kid Art
"Werk" (Karlie Redd featuring Spice & Capella Grey)	2022	
"You Be Ight" (Loopy Ferrell featuring Capella Grey & Sada James)	2022	
"Impatient" (Neila featuring Capella Grey)	2023	
"Skin Out" (Monroe X featuring CJ & Capella Grey)	2023	Foday Films
"Facetime" (Byrd Gang & Jim Jones featuring Capella Grey, Dyce Payso & DramaB2R)	2023	Jim Jones & Shula The Don

== Tours ==
=== Supporting ===
- 1999–2000 Tour (Joey Badass) (2022)

== Awards and nominations ==
Award	Year	Category	Nominee(s)	Result	Ref.
Soul Train Music Awards	2021	Best New Artist	Himself	Nominated	
