= Monique The Star =

American singer (born 1996)

- Born: Monique Spencer; January 10, 1996 (age 29); Newark, New Jersey, U.S.
- Genres: R&B; Soul
- Occupations: Singer; performer
- Years active: 2019–present
- Labels: Wonda Music Media
- Website: moniquethestar.com

Monique Spencer (born January 10, 1996), professionally known as Monique The Star, is an American singer from Newark, New Jersey. She was signed by Jerry Duplessis of Wonda Music Media Known for his work with Wyclef Jean, Fugees, Whitney Houston and more. Monique gained recognition in the late 2010s for her heartfelt storytelling and collaborations with artists.

== Career ==
Monique began her music career in 2019. By 2020, she had collaborated with hip-hop artists Shotgun Suge, Bexgawd, Max YB, and DoItAll from the Lords of the Underground.

=== "Real Woman" and Soft Girl Era ===
In 2024, Monique released the single "Real Woman" featuring Bronx rapper Capella Grey. The song, produced by Jerry Wonda, Dre Knight, and Arden "Arkeyz" Altino. "Real Woman" serves as the lead single for Monique's upcoming album, Soft Girl Era, a project that promises to showcase her artistic and personal evolution.

== Discography ==
=== Singles ===
Title	Year	Album	Label
"Real Woman Ft. Capella Grey"	2024	Soft Girl Era	Wonda Music Media
