= Content Coach Lindsay =

American TV host and entrepreneur

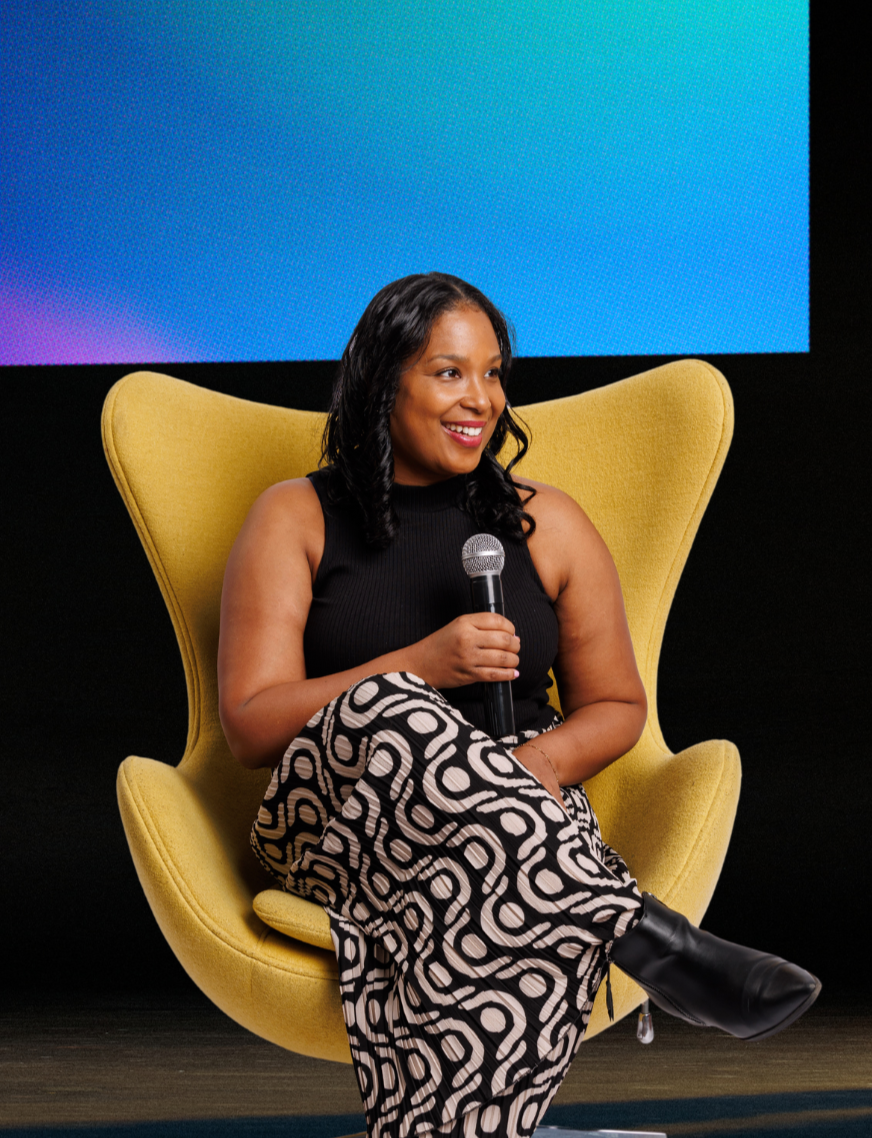
- Lindsay speaking at a business conference in New York (2024)
- Born: Lindsay Ivana Burgess; March 12, 1991 (age 35); Peekskill, New York
- Other names: Content Coach Lindsay, Lyrix The Writer
- Education: Pace University (Communications, marketing & journalism)
- Occupations: TV host, social media content coach, entrepreneur, co-executive producer and song writer
- Website: contentcoachlindsay.com

Lindsay Burgess, known professionally as Content Coach Lindsay, is an American TV host, social media content coach, entrepreneur, and former entertainment journalist. She is recognized for her work in empowering entrepreneurs to build their brands and scale their businesses, and for her role as co-executive producer and host of the upcoming television series, "Talk Money."

== Early life and education ==
Lindsay Burgess was born on March 12, 1991, in Peekskill, New York. She graduated from Pace University with a background in communications, marketing, and journalism.

== Career ==
=== Entertainment journalism ===
Prior to her career as a business coach, Burgess worked in entertainment media, where she conducted interviews with notable figures such as comedian Sinbad and rock band Outlaws at Paramount Hudson Valley Theater in Peekskill, New York, through Red House Entertainment LLC.

=== Social media content coaching and entrepreneurship ===
In 2021, Burgess transitioned into coaching, focusing on helping entrepreneurs develop their brands and expand their businesses, operating as an international business coach.

=== "Talk Money" ===
Burgess is the co-executive producer and host of the upcoming television series "Talk Money," produced by Popular Demand and Record Executive John Kwatakye-Atiko. The series aims to demystify wealth building and make financial literacy accessible to a diverse audience. The show will feature interviews with celebrities, music executives, entrepreneurs, athletes, government officials, and authors, who will share their experiences in turning their passion into profit. The series focuses on delivering financial literacy, offering actionable insights and real-world examples of achieving financial success.
