= Jada Kingdom =

Jamaican singer, model and social media personality

Jada Ashanti Murphy (born 5 September 1998), known professionally as Jada Kingdom, is a Jamaican dancehall and R&B singer, songwriter and music producer. Born and raised in Kingston, she originally started her career as a swimsuit model on Instagram before becoming a musician. She is known for her unique blend of dancehall and R&B in her music, melodic flow and passionate lyrics.

== Early life ==
Born on 5 September 1998, in St Andrew, Jamaica, she has gained recognition both locally and internationally.

== Career ==
Jada is a singer-songwriter and musician who began writing music in her early teens. She initially wrote songs for other artists before launching her solo career. In 2019, she released her debut single, "Heavy," which gained popularity on streaming platforms and social media. Following the success of this single, Jada released several other songs, culminating in the release of her debut EP in 2020.

Since then, she has collaborated with prominent artists such as John Legend, Popcaan, and Vybz Kartel, contributing to various tracks. Jada has also performed at Coachella and Red Rocks Amphitheater, establishing herself as a significant figure in the music industry.
