= Chantae Vetrice =

American Rapper and Singer

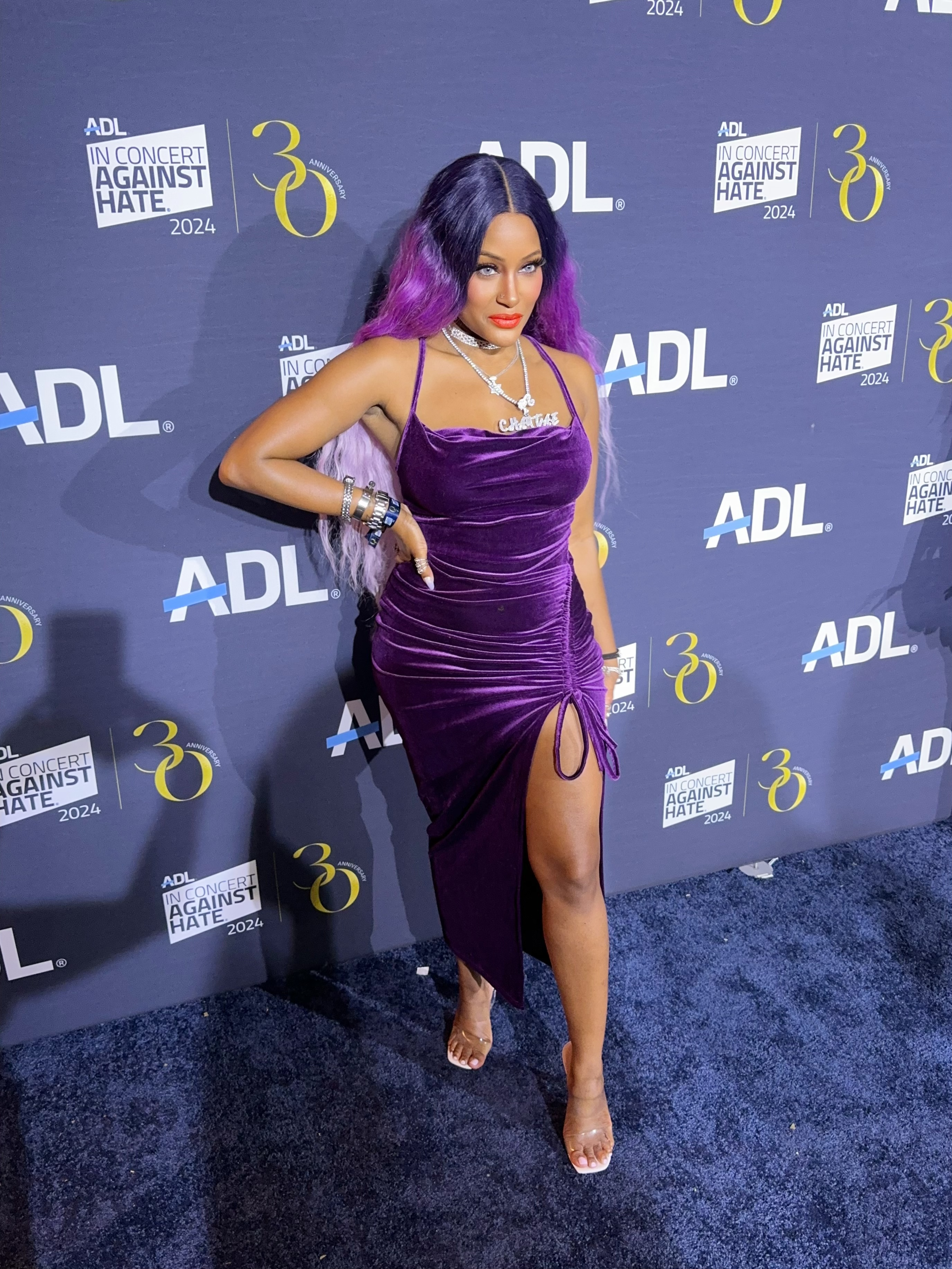
- Chantae Vetrice at the ADL 2024

Background information
- Born: Chantae Vetricé; July 24th Rochester, New York, U.S.
- Genres: Hip Hop R&B; Pop Music
- Occupations: Rapper; Singer; Performer
- Years active: 2012–present
- Labels: Popular Demand Entertainment (Former Label)
- Website: chantaevetrice.com

Chantae Vetricé (born July 24), professionally known as Chantae Vetrice, is an American rapper and singer born in Rochester, New York. She was signed to Popular Demand Entertainment and has since gone independent.

== Career ==
Chantae began her career as a Rap / Pop artist in the U.S., Canada and Ibiza Spain. She later released hip hop trap music under the same name with her single Elevated. In 2023 she signed a partnership deal with Popular Demand Entertainment and released her first single Betcha that reached over 1 Million streams in its first week, her follow up single Cash App was covered on mainstream Radio and other outlets.

== Support of Israel ==
Chantae is a vocal supporter of a two state solution between Israel and Palestine. She identifies as a Black Jewish woman and has stated that she is proud of her support for the Jewish background. Vetrice has been outspoken about her beliefs in the face of criticism, and has said that she believes it is important to be true to oneself and stand up for one's beliefs. Vetrice's support for Israel has been praised by some and criticized by others.

=== Vetrice and other celebrities defend Jamie Foxx ===
In August 2023, actor Jamie Foxx faced accusations of antisemitism following an Instagram post. While some, including actress Jennifer Aniston, condemned the post, numerous celebrities defended Foxx, asserting that his message was misconstrued and not intended to be hateful.

Among those who supported Foxx was Chantae' Vetrice, who stated: "As a Black Jewish woman and a [woman] in entertainment, I accept the apology and I believe you didn't mean any harm in what you said. Unfortunately, antisemitism is on the rise and this is the state we are in. Continue BEING YOU. You've always been one of the best."

Other celebrities who defended Foxx included retired basketball player Etan Thomas, comedian Jay Pharoah, model Winnie Harlow, rapper Waka Flocka Flame, R&B star Keisha Epps, and filmmaker Kenya Barris. Their defenses ranged from clarifying the intended meaning of the post within the Black community to emphasizing Foxx's character and lack of hateful intent.

== TV Appearances ==
List of Appearances
| Title | Year | Version | Role | Ref. |
As Chantae Vetrice
| "Pass at Me" | 2011 | Original | Self | |
| "Glad You Came" | 2011 | Original | Self | |

== Discography ==
=== Singles ===
| Title | Year | Album | Label |
|---|---|---|---|
| "Betcha" | 2023 | The Other Side | Popular Demand Entertainment |
| "Cash App" | 2024 | The Other Side | Popular Demand Entertainment |
| "VEGAS (What Goes On)" | 2024 | The Other Side | Popular Demand Entertainment |
