= Rapsody =

American rapper (born 1983)

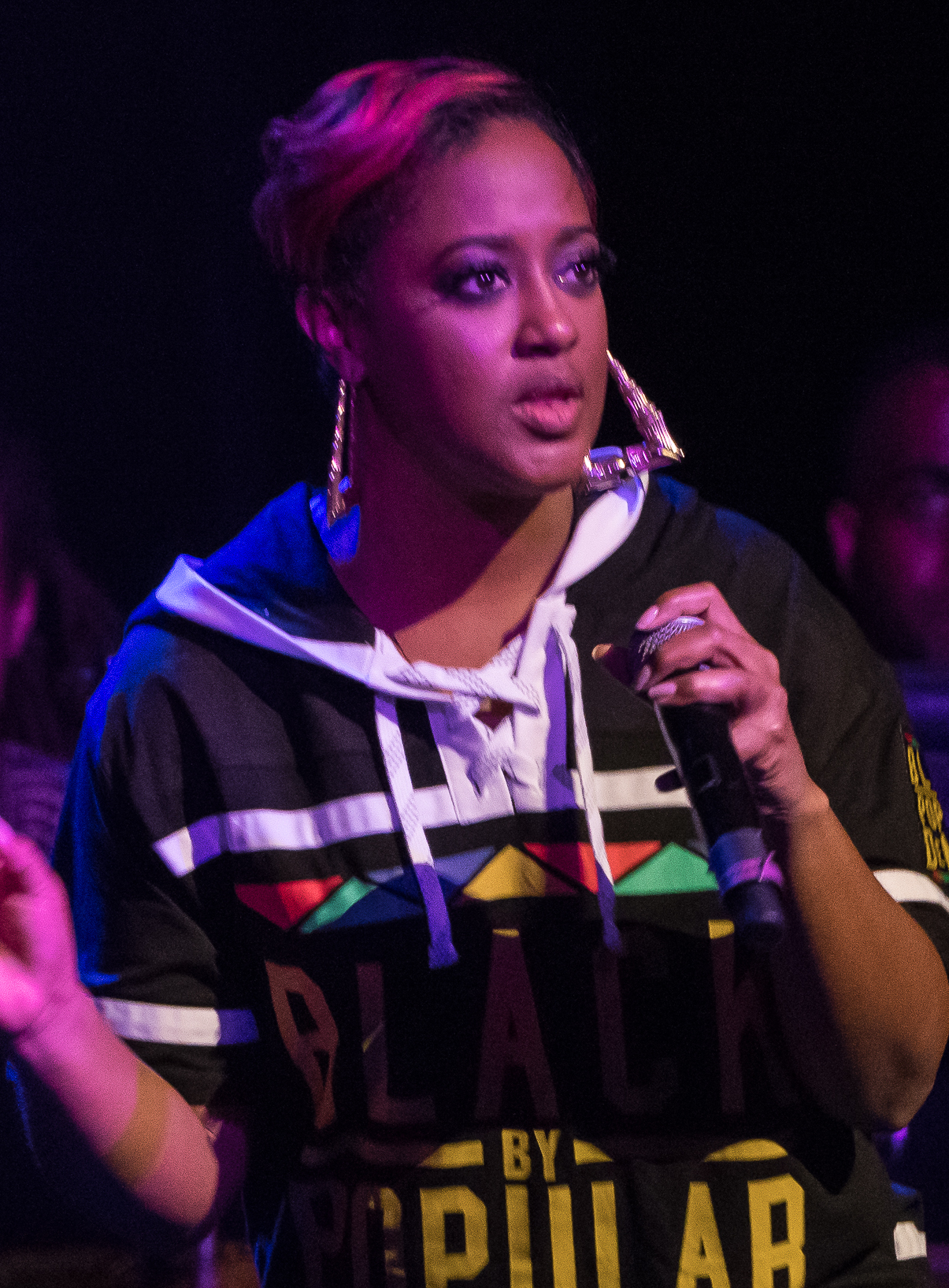
- Rapsody performing in 2018

Background information
- Also known as: Rapdiddy
- Born: Marlanna Evans; January 21, 1983 (age 43); Snow Hill, North Carolina, U.S.
- Genre: Hip hop
- Occupations: Rapper; songwriter
- Years active: 2003–present
- Labels: It's a Wonderful World Music Group; Roc Nation; We Each Other
- Website: iamrapsody.com

Marlanna Evans (born January 21, 1983), better known by her stage name Rapsody, is an American rapper. After signing with music producer 9th Wonder's music label It's a Wonderful World Music Group, she released a series of mixtapes and collaborated with Erykah Badu and Talib Kweli. Soon afterwards Rapsody released her debut album The Idea of Beautiful (2012). She would attain further prominence when she was featured on Kendrick Lamar's 2015 album To Pimp a Butterfly, on the track "Complexion (A Zulu Love)".

Her second album, Laila's Wisdom (2017), received critical acclaim and was nominated at the Grammy Awards for Best Rap Album and Best Rap Song. Rapsody released her third studio album, Eve on August 23, 2019, to critical acclaim from music critics. In 2020, she was featured alongside Cordae, Chika, and Busta Rhymes, on the Stevie Wonder song "Can't Put It in the Hands of Fate". Rapsody released her fourth album, Please Don't Cry, on May 17, 2024. She released her fifth studio album, God Gotta Afro & Gold Hoops on August 21, 2026.

== Career ==
Rapsody began her career at North Carolina State University, where she would later join hip hop collective H2O and its spinoff group Kooley High, despite not having rapped before. The group met producer 9th Wonder in 2004, who was impressed by one of Rapsody's verses, and she would go on to make her recording debut on 9th Wonder's sophomore album, The Dream Merchant Vol. 2 which released on October 9, 2007, in which she freestyled over 9th's re-chopping of old samples he already used for other artists.

She launched her solo career in 2008 after signing with 9th Wonder's It's A Wonderful World Music Group. Her first significant career breakthrough came with the release of her mixtape Return of the B-Girl on December 7, 2010. Return of the B-Girl marked her first work with hip-hop producer, DJ Premier, and featured guests such as Mac Miller and Big Daddy Kane. She continued to build acclaim with the release of her next mixtape, Thank H.E.R. Now which showcased her storytelling abilities as she drew from personal life experiences and featured her work with a variety of critically acclaimed acts such as Marsha Ambrosius, Estelle, Raekwon, Jean Grae, Murs, and Big K.R.I.T.

Her next project, For Everything was released on November 15, 2011, and showcased her work with both newly acclaimed and established acts such as Kendrick Lamar and Freeway and a number of the tracks were featured in XXL magazine's "Bangers" section. In May 2011, Rapsody joined Mac Miller on his Incredibly Dope Tour for 15 dates. In late 2011, she toured with Phonte and 9th Wonder as a part of the Phonte & 9th Wonder Tour.

Rapsody signed with Jay-Z's record label Roc Nation in July 2016, and her debut for the label, Laila's Wisdom, was released on September 22, 2017. The album received two Grammy Award nominations for Best Rap Album and Best Rap Song.

Rapsody's third studio album, Eve, was released on August 23, 2019, to critical acclaim from music critics. In June 2024, Rapsody's "Asteroids" was nominated for the Hollywood Independent Music Awards in the Adult Contemporary Hip Hop category. The song was the first lead single from her fourth studio album, Please Don't Cry, her first project after five years. The album released on May 17, 2024. The album spawned the single, "3:AM", featuring Erykah Badu, which went on to win the Grammy Award for Best Melodic Rap Performance at the 67th Annual Grammy Awards.

In 2025, she released the EP, MadRaps, in collaboration with producer Madlib. The following year, she released her fifth studio album, God Gotta Afro & Gold Hoops. The album featured guest appearances from Amanda Reifer, George Clinton and Malice.

== Style and philosophy ==
Rapsody is known for her intricate rhyme patterns, metaphors, and wordplay. She is often hailed as one of the best living lyricists in the hip-hop genre. Rapsody cites Jay-Z, Mos Def, Lauryn Hill, and MC Lyte as the biggest influences on her music.

Rapsody's production is primarily handled by The Soul Council, the team of in-house producers at It's A Wonderful World Music Group comprising E. Jones, Ka$h Don't Make Beats, AMP, Eric G., Nottz and Khrysis. Rapsody's philosophy is "Culture Over Everything," referring to the culture of hip-hop music. She describes this phrase in an interview with Vibe where she says, "To me, it's about culture more so than money or anything. I make music for the people of the culture we’re in; that comes first. If you touch the people first, the rest just falls into place. That's what it means to me, just preserving and respecting the culture."

== Personal life ==
In her younger years, she watched the MTV show Yo! MTV Raps and considered MC Lyte as one of her early influences and later stated Lauryn Hill as an all-time favorite. She grew up in the small town of Snow Hill in North Carolina. Rapsody wasn't exposed to much hip hop and would listen to what her older cousins would play in the car. She would later develop her love for hip hop when she entered college.

Her 2017 album Laila's Wisdom was named after her grandmother, Laila Ray.

In 2019, Rapsody played for the "Home" roster during the NBA All-Star Celebrity Game at the Bojangles' Coliseum in Charlotte, North Carolina. The roster was made up of celebrities with Carolina roots. Her team won the game and she had one assist in the game while playing around 12 minutes.

== Discography ==
=== Studio albums ===
Title	Album details	Peak chart positions	
Title	Album details	US	US R&B/HH
The Idea of Beautiful	Released: August 28, 2012; Label: Jamla; Format: LP, CD, digital download, streaming	—	—
Laila's Wisdom	Released: September 22, 2017; Label: Jamla, Roc Nation; Format: LP, CD, digital download, streaming	125	—
Eve	Released: August 23, 2019; Label: Jamla, Roc Nation; Format: LP, CD, digital download, streaming	76	42
Please Don't Cry	Released: May 17, 2024; Label: Jamla, Roc Nation; Format: LP, CD, cassette, digital download, streaming	—	—
God Gotta Afro & Gold Hoops	Released: August 21, 2026; Label: We Each Other, Inc., Roc Nation; Format: LP, CD, cassette, digital download, streaming	—	—

=== Extended plays ===
- The Black Mamba (2012)
- Beauty and the Beast (2014)
- Crown (2016)

==== with Kooley High ====
- Kooley High Presents... Raleigh's Finest (Mixtape) (2007)
- The Summer Sessions EP (2008)
- Eastern Standard Time (2010)
- Kooley High Presents...David Thompson (2011)

==== with Madlib ====
- MadRaps (2025)

=== Mixtapes ===
- Return of the B-Girl (2010)
- Thank H.E.R. Now (2011)
- For Everything (2011)
- She Got Game (2013)

=== Guest appearances ===
Title	Year	Other performer(s)	Album
"We Are Jamla"	2009	Skyzoo, Big Remo, GQ	The Power of Words
"As We Shine"	2009	Thee Tom Hardy, D-Mal	The Hardy Boy Mystery Mixtape: Curse of thee Green Faceded
"Okaaaaaay"	2009	Thee Tom Hardy, TP	The Hardy Boy Mystery Mixtape: Curse of thee Green Faceded
"Let's Go"	2010	Actual Proof	The Free EP
"It's Cool (Word to A. Gilliam)"	2010	Actual Proof	The Free EP
"Times Up"	2010	Actual Proof, Halo, GQ, Sean Boog	The Free EP
"I Will Always Be Down"	2010	Heather Victoria	Victoria's Secret
"Your Favorites"	2010	Thee Tom Hardy	The Hardy Boy Mystery Mixtape: Secret of thee Green Magic
"Never Settle"	2010	Sean Boog, Halo, Sundown	Light Beers Ahead of You
"What It Is"	2010	Sean Boog	Light Beers Ahead of You
"Heroes"	2010	Sean Boog, Big Remo, King Mez, Halo, GQ, TP	Light Beers Ahead of You
"Breathe"	2011	Actual Proof	The Talented Tenth
"The Jungle"	2011	Halo	Heat Writer II
"Dream Big"	2011	TP	TP Is My Hero
"Won't Stress Me"	2011	Heather Victoria	Graffiti Diary
"Fight the Feeling"	2011	Sean Boog, Halo, Tyler Woods	The Phantom of the Jamla
"Represent"	2011	Actual Proof	Still Hotter Than July
"Sizzlin"	2011	Median	The Sender
"Lines"	2011	Halo, 9thmatic	The Blind Poet
"20 Feet Tall (Remix)"	2011	9th Wonder, Erykah Badu	The Wonder Years
"Set It Off"	2011	The Away Team, Talib Kweli	Scars & Stripes
"Black Swan"	2011	Statik Selektah, Nitty Scott, MC	Population Control
"ACC"	2011	GQ, Halo	Trouble Man
"Optimus Prime"	2011	GQ, Bluu Suede	Trouble Man
"Not Taking You Back"	2011	Heather Victoria	Hip Hop Soul Lives
"Headlights"	2012	Actual Proof	Black Boy Radio
"Many Microphones"	2012	Actual Proof, 9thmatic	Black Boy Radio
"I'm Back"	2012	Big Remo	Sleepwalkers
"A Love Never Dies"	2012	Sean Boog, Khrysis	Sean Boogie Nights
"And Another One"	2012	Rah Digga	Non-album single
"Shorty Left"	2012	Buckshot, 9th Wonder	The Solution
"Get Together"	2012	Murs, 9th Wonder	The Final Adventure
"Gettin' Mine"	2013	Big K.R.I.T., Heather Victoria	Non-album single
"Same Shit"	2013	Oh No, Psalm One	Disrupted Ads
"I Know"	2013	GQ, Rocki Evans	Death Threats & Love Notes: The Prelude
"Before Midnight"	2013	L'Orange & Stik Figa	The City Under the City
"It's OK"	2013	Add-2 & Khrysis	Between Heaven and Hell
"The Resurrector"	2014	Bishop Lamont	The (P)reformation
"Hallelujah"	2014	Dilated Peoples, Fashawn, Domo Genesis, Vinnie Paz, Action Bronson	Directors of Photography
"Pretty Balloons"	2014	Halo	Mansa Musa
"Pump Ya Brakes"	2014	Diamond D, Boog Brown, Stacy Epps	The Diam Piece
"Never Give Up (One for Ava)"	2014	A-Villa, Guilty Simpson, Villa, Avalyn Villagomez	Carry on Tradition
"Complexion (A Zulu Love)"	2015	Kendrick Lamar	To Pimp a Butterfly
"Told Y'all"	2015	dEnAuN	sTuFf In My BaCkPaCk
"Kidnapped"	2015	King Magnetic	Timing Is Everything
"Another Level"	2015	Statik Selektah	Lucky 7
"Stop Play Rewind"	2015	Add-2	Prey for the Poor
"Kool Aid"	2015	Add-2, Sam Trump	Prey for the Poor
"Guillotine Flow"	2015	Big K.R.I.T.	Non-album single
"Respect"	2015	Bad Lucc	Breathe
"Ski Mask Way"	2015	Bad Lucc	Breathe
"Every Ghetto"	2015	Talib Kweli, 9th Wonder	Indie 500
"Life Ahead of Me"	2015	Talib Kweli, 9th Wonder	Indie 500
"Don't Be Afraid"	2015	Talib Kweli, 9th Wonder, Problem, Bad Lucc	Indie 500
"See Love"	2015	Shawn Stockman	Non-album single
"Walk Like a God"	2015	Murs, 9th Wonder, Propaganda	Brighter Daze
"Without You"	2016	Anderson .Paak	Malibu
"Far Gone"	2016	Musiq Soulchild	Life on Earth
"Shadows Crawl (DJ Premier Open Eyes Remix)"	2016	Torii Wolf	Non-album singles
"Guns Hang High"	2016	GQ	Non-album singles
"The Law"	2016	Ab-Soul, Mac Miller	Do What Thou Wilt.
"Let It Burn"	2017	Talib Kweli, Styles P, Chris Rivers	The Seven
"Loved Ones"	2018	PRhyme	PRhyme 2
"Love Is A Funny Thing"	2018	Evidence, Styles P, Khrysis	Weather or Not
"Care To Say About It"	2018	T.I.	Rapture The Soundtrack
"Go"	2018	H.E.R., Alex da Kid	Non-album singles
"Go (Remix)"	2018	H.E.R., Alex da Kid, Jorja Smith	Non-album singles
"Dostoyevsky"	2018	Black Thought	Streams of Thought, Vol. 1
"Big Discount"	2019	The Karrin Allyson Sextet	Shoulder to Shoulder: A Centennial Tribute to Women's Suffrage
"Wishing Well"	2019	Elle Varner	Ellevation
"He Won't Hold You"	2020	Jacob Collier	Djesse Vol. 3
"Fight The Power: Remix 2020"	2020	Public Enemy, Nas, Black Thought, Jahi, YG, ?uestlove	What You Gonna Do When the Grid Goes Down?
"The Mighty Tree"	2020	Terrace Martin, Robert Glasper, 9th Wonder, Kamasi Washington, Herbie Hancock	Dinner Party: Dessert
"Air & Water Interlude"	2020	T.I.	The L.I.B.R.A.
"Can't Put It in the Hands of Fate"	2020	Stevie Wonder, Cordae, Chika, Busta Rhymes	Non-album single
"Deep End (Remix)"	2020	Lecrae	Restoration
"Fallback"	2022	Phife Dawg, Renée Neufville	Forever
"Still"	2025	Joey Badass, Ab-Soul	Lonely at the Top
"PS118"	2025	Jurin Asaya	Non-album single

== Other sources ==
Kooley High Presents... Raleigh's Finest Mixtape by Kooley High, HaLo, Median, Lazurus, Rsonist, Nervous Reck Hosted by DJ ill digitz, 9th Wonder, Big Treal, The Alchemist, Marco Polo, Monie Love
