= Anderson .Paak discography =

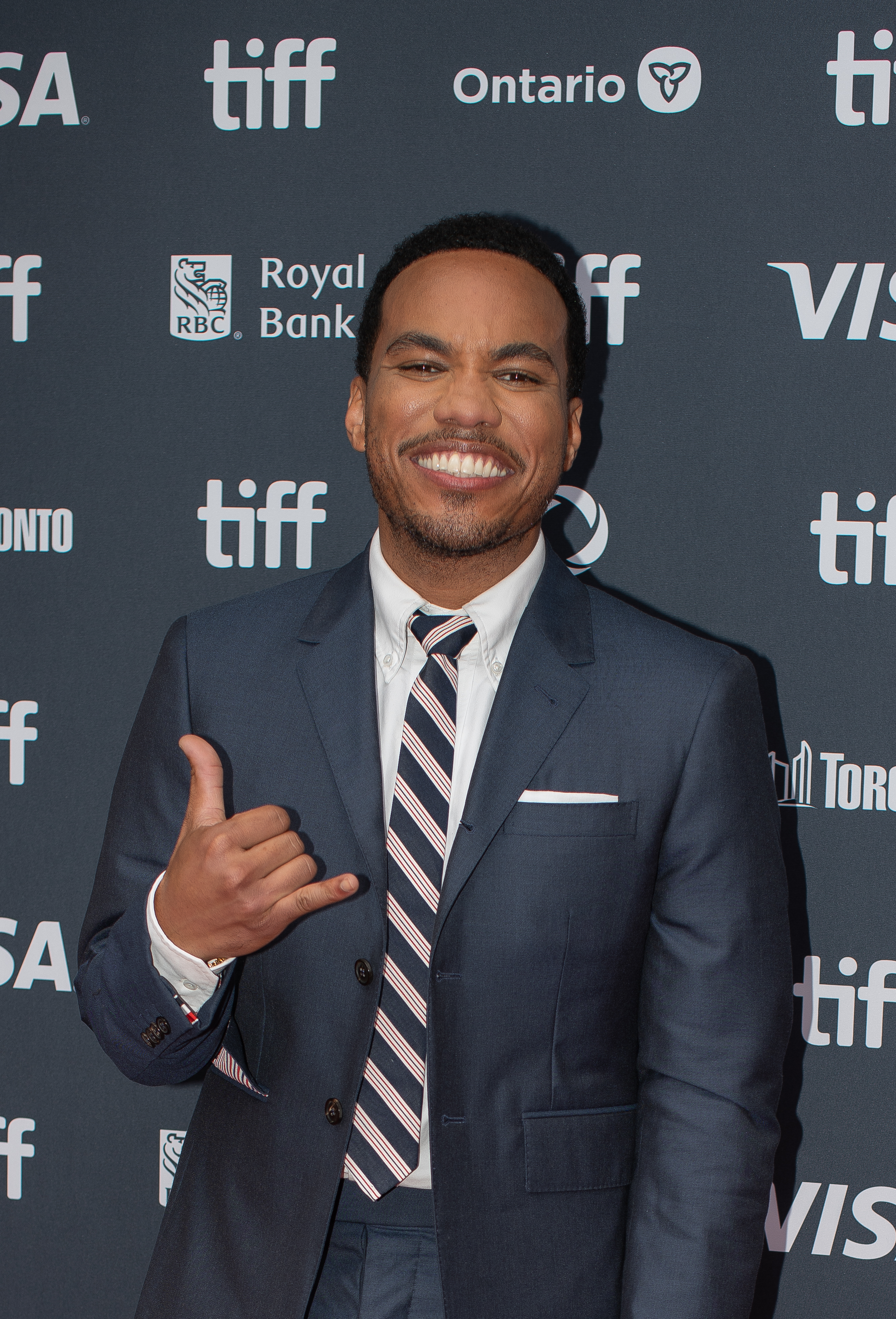
- Anderson .Paak in 2024
- Studio albums: 4
- EPs: 4
- Singles: 23
- Collaborative albums: 4
- Mixtapes: 1

The discography of American singer Anderson .Paak consists of four studio albums, four collaborative albums, four extended plays (EP), one mixtape and 18 singles.

== Albums ==
=== Studio albums ===
List of studio albums, with selected chart positions
Title	Album details	Peak chart positions										Certifications
Title	Album details	US	US R&B /HH	AUS	BEL (FL)	CAN	FRA	NL	NZ	SWI	UK	Certifications
Venice	Released: October 28, 2014; Label: Steel Wool, OBE, Empire; Format: LP, CD, digital download	—	—	—	—	—	—	—	—	—	—	
Malibu	Released: January 15, 2016; Label: Steel Wool, OBE, Art Club, Empire; Format: LP, CD, digital download	79	9	85	22	88	92	18	39	33	—	RIAA: Gold; BPI: Gold; IFPI DEN: Gold
Oxnard	Released: November 16, 2018; Label: Aftermath, 12Tone, Atlantic; Format: LP, CD, digital download	11	6	20	25	16	117	21	22	46	42	
Ventura	Released: April 12, 2019; Label: Aftermath, 12Tone, Atlantic; Format: LP, CD, digital download	4	2	19	18	4	98	7	15	34	27	
"—" denotes a recording that did not chart or was not released in that territory.

List of collaborative albums, with selected chart positions
Title	Details	Peak chart positions										Certifications
Title	Details	US	US R&B /HH	AUS	BEL (FL)	CAN	FRA	NL	NZ	SWI	UK	Certifications
Yes Lawd! (with Knxwledge as NxWorries)	Released: October 21, 2016; Label: Stones Throw; Format: Digital download, CD, LP	59	3	48	63	—	192	82	—	97	—	
An Evening with Silk Sonic (with Bruno Mars as Silk Sonic)	Released: November 12, 2021; Label: Aftermath, 12 Tone, Atlantic; Format: CD, LP, digital download, streaming	2	1	4	7	3	12	4	3	5	9	RIAA: Platinum; BPI: Silver; MC: Platinum; NVPI: Gold; RMNZ: Platinum; SNEP: Gold
Why Lawd? (with Knxwledge as NxWorries)	Released: June 14, 2024; Label: Stones Throw; Format: Digital download, CD, LP, cassette	81	26	8	113	—	—	68	—	—	30	
Heavy Is the Crown (with Cordae)	Released: October 23, 2026; Label: Apeshit + Empire, Hi Level + Mass Appeal; Format: Digital download, CD, LP, cassette	11	2	—	160	—	—	—	—	90	—	
"—" denotes a recording that did not chart or was not released in that territory.

=== Mixtapes ===
List of mixtapes, with selected details
Title	Details
Sh%t I Can't Clear (as Breezy Lovejoy)	Released: February 12, 2010; Label: Self-released; Format: Digital download

== Extended plays ==
List of extended plays, with selected details
Title	Details
Violets Are Blue (as Breezy Lovejoy)	Released: February 14, 2010; Label: Block Cheddar; Format: Digital download
Cover Art	Released: December 4, 2013; Label: Hellfyre Club; Format: Digital download
The Anderson .Paak EP (with Blended Babies)	Released: September 28, 2015; Label: BBMG; Format: Digital download
Link Up & Suede (with Knxwledge, as NxWorries)	Released: December 4, 2015; Label: Stones Throw; Format: CD, LP, digital download, streaming

== Singles ==
=== As lead artist ===
Title	Year	Peak chart positions										Certifications	Album
Title	Year	US	US R&B /HH	US Adult R&B	AUS	BEL (FL)	FRA	IRE	NLD	NZ	UK	Certifications	Album
"Drugs"	2014	—	—	—	—	—	—	—	—	—	—		Venice
"Miss Right"	2014	—	—	—	—	—	—	—	—	—	—		Venice
"The Season / Carry Me"	2015	—	—	—	—	—	—	—	—	—	—		Malibu
"Am I Wrong" (featuring ScHoolboy Q)	2015	—	—	—	—	— (Note: "Am I Wrong" did not enter the Ultratop 50, but peaked at number six on the Flemish Ultratip chart.)	152	—	—	—	—	RIAA: Gold; RMNZ: Gold	Malibu
"Room in Here" (featuring The Game)	2015	—	—	—	—	—	—	—	—	—	—		Malibu
"Come Down" (solo or featuring T.I.)	2016	—	—	—	—	— (Note: "Come Down" did not enter the Ultratop 50, but peaked at number 13 on the Flemish Ultratip chart.)	—	—	—	—	—	RIAA: Platinum; BPI: Silver; RMNZ: Platinum	Malibu
"'Til It's Over"	2018	—	—	—	—	— (Note: "Til It's Over" did not enter the Ultratop 50, but peaked at number 18 on the Flemish Ultratip chart.)	—	—	—	—	—		Non-album singles
"Bubblin"	2018	—	—	—	—	—	—	—	—	—	—	RIAA: Gold	Non-album singles
"Tints" (with Kendrick Lamar)	2018	— (Note: "Tints" did not enter the Billboard Hot 100, but peaked at number 22 on the Bubbling Under Hot 100 chart.)	— (Note: "Tints" did not enter the Billboard Hot R&B/Hip-Hop Songs, but peaked at number seven on the Bubbling Under Hot R&B/Hip-Hop Singles chart.)	9	81	50	—	77	—	—	81	RIAA: Gold; RMNZ: Gold	Oxnard
"Who R U?"	2018	—	—	—	—	—	—	—	—	—	—		Oxnard
"King James"	2019	—	—	—	—	— (Note: "King James" did not enter the Ultratop 50, but peaked at number three on the Flemish Ultratip chart.)	—	—	—	—	—		Ventura
"Make It Better" (featuring Smokey Robinson)	2019	—	—	2	—	—	—	—	—	—	—	RIAA: Gold; RMNZ: Gold	Ventura
"Don't Slack" (with Justin Timberlake)	2020	—	—	—	—	— (Note: "Don't Slack" did not enter the Ultratop 50 Flanders chart, but garnered an unranked position on its extension, the Ultratip Flanders chart.)	—	—	— (Note: "Don't Slack" did not enter the Dutch Top 40, but reached number 24 on its extension, Tipparade.)	—	—		Trolls World Tour (Original Motion Picture Soundtrack)
"Lockdown"	2020	—	—	—	—	—	—	—	—	—	—		Non-album single
"Cut Em In" (featuring Rick Ross)	2020	—	—	—	—	—	—	—	—	—	—		Madden NFL 21
"Jewelz"	2020	—	—	—	—	—	—	—	—	—	—		Non-album single
"Leave the Door Open" (with Bruno Mars as Silk Sonic)	2021	1	1	1	10	5	39	18	11	1	20	RIAA: 2× Platinum; ARIA: Gold; BPI: Platinum; MC: 5× Platinum; NVPI: Gold; RMNZ: 4× Platinum	An Evening with Silk Sonic
"Skate" (with Bruno Mars as Silk Sonic)	2021	14	4	4	32	17	166	48	24	12	45	BPI: Silver; MC: Platinum; RMNZ: Platinum	An Evening with Silk Sonic
"Smokin Out the Window" (with Bruno Mars as Silk Sonic)	2021	5	2	1	8	24	150	11	32	4	12	RIAA: 2× Platinum; BPI: Silver; MC: 2× Platinum; RMNZ: 2× Platinum	An Evening with Silk Sonic
"Love's Train" (with Bruno Mars as Silk Sonic)	2022	— (Note: "Love's Train" did not enter the Billboard Hot 100, but peaked at number 11 on the Bubbling Under Hot 100 chart.)	47	1	—	—	—	—	—	— (Note: "Love's Train" did not enter the NZ Top 40 Singles Chart, but peaked at number 18 on the NZ Hot Singles Chart.)	—		An Evening with Silk Sonic
"After Last Night" (with Bruno Mars as Silk Sonic, with Thundercat and Bootsy Collins)	2022	68	17	1	—	—	—	—	— (Note: "After Last Night" did not enter the NZ Top 40 Singles Chart, but peaked at number eight on the NZ Hot Singles Chart.)	—	—	MC: Platinum; RMNZ: Gold	An Evening with Silk Sonic
"Too Fast (Pull Over)" (with Jay Rock featuring Latto)	2023	—	—	—	—	—	—	—	—	—	—		Non-album single
"Places to Be" (with Fred Again and Chika)	2024	—	—	—	51	—	—	43	—	27	35	ARIA: Platinum; BPI: Silver; RMNZ: Gold	Ten Days
"A Good Day" (with Cordae)	2026	—	38	—	—	—	—	—	—	—	—		Heavy Is the Crown
"—" denotes a recording that did not chart or was not released in that territory.

=== As featured artist ===
Title	Year	Peak chart positions								Certifications	Album
Title	Year	US Bub.	US R&B /HH	US Dance	AUS	BEL (FL) Tip	FRA	IRL	NZ	Certifications	Album
"Dance Off" (Macklemore & Ryan Lewis featuring Anderson .Paak and Idris Elba)	2016	—	—	—	7	13	137	59	29	ARIA: Platinum; RMNZ: Platinum	This Unruly Mess I've Made
"Glowed Up" (Kaytranada featuring Anderson .Paak)	2016	—	—	—	—	—	—	—	—	RIAA: Gold; RMNZ: Gold	99.9%
"Dang!" (Mac Miller featuring Anderson .Paak)	2016	7	45	—	99	3	76	—	—	RIAA: Gold; BPI: Silver; RMNZ: 2× Platinum	The Divine Feminine
"RNP" (Cordae featuring Anderson .Paak)	2019	15	— (Note: "RNP" did not enter the Billboard Hot R&B/Hip-Hop Songs, but peaked at number three on the Bubbling Under Hot R&B/Hip-Hop Singles chart.)	—	—	—	—	92	— (Note: "RNP" did not enter the NZ Top 40 Singles Chart, but peaked at number four on the NZ Hot Singles Chart.)	RIAA: Gold; MC: Gold; RMNZ: 2× Platinum	The Lost Boy
"More" (Flying Lotus featuring Anderson .Paak)	2019	—	—	30	—	—	—	—	—		Flamagra
"Stainless" (The Game featuring Anderson .Paak)	2019	—	—	—	—	—	—	—	—		Born 2 Rap
"Yuuuu" (Busta Rhymes featuring Anderson .Paak)	2020	—	—	—	—	—	—	—	—		Extinction Level Event 2: The Wrath of God
"Coast" (Hailee Steinfeld featuring Anderson .Paak)	2022	—	—	—	—	—	—	—	— (Note: "Coast" did not enter the NZ Top 40 Singles Chart, but peaked at number five on the NZ Hot Singles Chart.)	RMNZ: Gold	Non-album singles
"Two Tens" (Cordae featuring Anderson .Paak)	2023	25	—	—	—	—	—	—	— (Note: "Two Tens" did not enter the NZ Top 40 Singles Chart, but peaked at number eight on the NZ Hot Singles Chart.)		Non-album singles
"Do 2 Me" (Kaytranada featuring Anderson .Paak and SiR)	2024	—	—	—	—	—	—	—	—		Timeless
"Summer Drop" (Cordae featuring Anderson .Paak)	2024	—	—	—	—	—	—	—	— (Note: "Summer Drop" did not enter the NZ Top 40 Singles Chart, but peaked at number 27 on the NZ Hot Singles Chart.)		The Crossroads
"Too Bad" (G-Dragon featuring Anderson .Paak)	2025	—	—	—	—	—	—	—	— (Note: "Too Bad" did not enter the NZ Top 40 Singles Chart, but peaked at number 16 on the NZ Hot Singles Chart.)		Übermensch
"Rock Solid" (Taeyong featuring Anderson .Paak)	2026	—	—	—	—	—	—	—	—		TBA
"—" denotes a recording that did not chart or was not released in that territory.

== Other charted and certified songs ==
Title	Year	Peak chart positions							Certifications	Album
Title	Year	US	US R&B /HH	IRE	NL	NZ Hot	POR	UK	Certifications	Album
"Medicine Man" (Dr. Dre featuring Eminem, Candice Pillay and Anderson .Paak)	2015	— (Note: "Medicine Man" did not enter the Billboard Hot 100, but peaked at number 21 on the Bubbling Under Hot 100 chart.)	40	—	—	—	—	—		Compton
"Deep Water" (Dr. Dre featuring Kendrick Lamar, Justus and Anderson .Paak)	2015	—	— (Note: "Deep Water" did not enter the Hot R&B/Hip-Hop Songs chart, but peaked at number six on the Bubbling Under R&B/Hip-Hop Singles chart.)	—	—	—	—	—		Compton
"Heart Don't Stand a Chance"	2016	—	—	—	—	—	—	—	RMNZ: Gold	Malibu
"Bloody Waters" (with Ab-Soul and James Blake)	2018	— (Note: "Bloody Waters" did not enter the Billboard Hot 100, but peaked at number 16 on the Bubbling Under Hot 100 chart.)	— (Note: "Bloody Waters" did not enter the Hot R&B/Hip-Hop Songs chart, but peaked at number five on the Bubbling Under R&B/Hip-Hop Singles chart.)	—	—	—	—	98		Black Panther: The Album
"Trippy" (featuring J. Cole)	2018	—	—	—	—	23	—	—		Oxnard
"6 Summers"	2018	—	—	—	—	31	—	—		Oxnard
"The Chase" (featuring Kadhja Bonet)	2018	—	—	—	—	37	—	—		Oxnard
"Come Home" (featuring André 3000)	2019	—	—	—	—	22	—	—		Ventura
"Reachin' 2 Much" (featuring Lalah Hathaway)	2019	—	—	—	—	29	—	—		Ventura
"Jet Black" (featuring Brandy)	2019	—	—	—	—	23	—	—		Ventura
"Lock It Up" (Eminem featuring Anderson .Paak)	2020	89	45	—	—	—	—	—	ARIA: Gold; RMNZ: Gold	Music to Be Murdered By
"Silk Sonic Intro" (with Bruno Mars as Silk Sonic)	2021	— (Note: "Silk Sonic Intro" did not enter the Billboard Hot 100, but peaked at number 14 on the Bubbling Under Hot 100 chart.)	48	—	—	34	—	—		An Evening with Silk Sonic
"Fire in the Sky"	2021	—	—	—	—	37	—	—		Shang-Chi and the Legend of the Ten Rings: The Album
"Fly as Me" (with Bruno Mars as Silk Sonic)	2021	81	23	51	75	9	114	49		An Evening with Silk Sonic
"Put on a Smile" (with Bruno Mars as Silk Sonic)	2021	78	22	—	—	10	137	—		An Evening with Silk Sonic
"777" (with Bruno Mars as Silk Sonic)	2021	— (Note: "777" did not enter the Billboard Hot 100, but peaked at number four on the Bubbling Under Hot 100 chart.)	35	—	—	—	192	—		An Evening with Silk Sonic
"Blast Off" (with Bruno Mars as Silk Sonic)	2021	73	20	—	—	—	102	—		An Evening with Silk Sonic
"Airbender" (with Cordae)	2026	— (Note: "Airbender" did not enter the Billboard Hot 100, but peaked at number 15 on the Bubbling Under Hot 100 chart.)	28	—	—	—	—	—		Heavy Is the Crown
"—" denotes a recording that did not chart or was not released in that territory.

== Guest appearances ==
List of guest appearances, with other performing artists, showing year released and album name
Title	Year	Other performer(s)	Album
"Do Thangs"	2009	Afro Classics	The Classic EP
"The Follow Through"	2009	Afro Classics	The Classic EP
"Sing My Song"	2010	Verbs	The Progress EP 2: Fuck Yea Man
"Cell Phone"	2011	Dumbfoundead	DFD
"Bitch"	2011	Dumbfoundead	DFD
"No More Sunny Days"	2011	Dumbfoundead	DFD
"Body High"	2012	Dumbfoundead	Love Everyday EP
"Wine"	2012	Dumbfoundead	Take the Stares
"Fuck It"	2012	Dumbfoundead	Take the Stares
"Drinking Alone"	2012	Dumbfoundead	Take the Stares
"Much Better"	2012	Verbs	The Progress EP 3: Manifest Awesome
"Dreaming Out Loud"	2012	Mike B.	Dear Michael, You're Welcome
"Summer Breeze"	2013	EOM	ForAllWeKnow
"I'm on It"	2013	EOM	ForAllWeKnow
"AimShootReload"	2013	EOM	ForAllWeKnow
"Prelection"	2013	Jose Rios	To Live and Grow in LA
"Sweet Day"	2013	Jose Rios	To Live and Grow in LA
"Feels Good"	2013	Wax	Continue
"Too Much to Ask"	2014	Nocando	Jimmy the Burnout
"Stand for Something"	2014	Watsky	All You Can Do
"Ink Don't Bleed"	2014	Watsky	All You Can Do
"Hand Over Hand"	2014	Watsky	All You Can Do
"My Supernova"	2014	Tiron & Ayomari	A Sucker for Pumps: Limited Edition
"It's Better for You"	2014	Shafiq Husayn	—N/a
"A Day Trip to the Nightosphere"	2014	Milo	A Toothpaste Suburb
"Realla"	2014	TOKiMONSTA	Desiderium
"New Days"	2014	Kush Mody	Creature Comforts and a Collection of Songs
"Freight Train"	2014	Kush Mody	Creature Comforts and a Collection of Songs
"Locked"	2014	Kush Mody	Creature Comforts and a Collection of Songs
"Sexy Sadie"	2014	Kush Mody	Creature Comforts and a Collection of Songs
"Get Along"	2015	EOM	Sunrain
"Green Light"	2015	Jonwayne	Jonwayne Is Retired
"Til It's Done"	2015	DJ Premier, BMB Spacekid	—N/a
"Shifty"	2015	Mike Gao	—N/a
"Own Life"	2015	Vindata	Through Time and Space...
"Liberation"	2015	Sir	Seven Sundays
"Cold Crush"	2015	Jose Rios	Jose Rios
"All in a Day's Work"	2015	Dr. Dre, Marsha Ambrosius	Compton
"Issues"	2015	Dr. Dre, Ice Cube, Dem Jointz	Compton
"Deep Water"	2015	Dr. Dre, Kendrick Lamar, Justus	Compton
"For the Love of Money"	2015	Dr. Dre, Jon Connor, Jill Scott	Compton
"Animals"	2015	Dr. Dre	Compton
"Medicine Man"	2015	Dr. Dre, Eminem, Candice Pillay	Compton
"Magnus Carlsen"	2015	The Game	The Documentary 2.5
"Crenshaw / 80s and Cocaine"	2015	The Game, Sonyae Elise	The Documentary 2.5
"The Strip"	2015	MED, Blu, Madlib	Bad Neighbor
"Bloomingdales"	2015	White Boiz	Neighborhood Wonderful
"Worlds to Run"	2015	Busdriver, Milo	Thumbs
"Unique"	2015	GoldLink	And After That, We Didn't Talk
"Put It Down"	2015	Tokimonsta	Fovere
"Found in You"	2015	Tokimonsta	—N/a
"Put My Hands on You"	2015	Dean	—N/a
"Church" (West Coast Remix)	2015	BJ the Chicago Kid	—N/a
"Dance Off"	2016	Macklemore, Ryan Lewis, Idris Elba	This Unruly Mess I've Made
"IT G MA Remix (josh pan Opus)"	2016	Keith Ape	—N/a
"Dapper"	2016	Domo Genesis	Genesis
"Blessings (Reprise)"	2016	Chance the Rapper	Coloring Book
"Money on Me"	2016	Snakehips	Money on Me
"Blank Face"	2016	ScHoolboy Q	Blank Face LP
"No Slaves"	2016	Knox Brown	Searching
"Responsibilities"	2016	Thane, BJ the Chicago Kid	Topia
"Dang!"	2016	Mac Miller	The Divine Feminine
"Movin Backwards"	2016	A Tribe Called Quest	We Got It from Here... Thank You 4 Your Service
"OooWee"	2016	Rapsody	Crown / Laila's Wisdom
"It Don't Matter"	2017	Moonbase	—N/a
"New LA"	2017	SiR, King Mez	Her Too
"Nobody"	2017	Rapsody, Black Thought, Moonchild	Laila's Wisdom
"Out Here"	2017	Ze11a, LG, Chels	4What4U
"Traveling Light"	2017	Talib Kweli	Radio Silence
"Bloody Waters"	2018	Ab-Soul, James Blake	Black Panther: The Album – Music from and Inspired By
"WrestleMania 20"	2018	Westside Gunn	Supreme Blientele
"Black Hole"	2018	Chris Dave and the Drumhedz	Chris Dave and the Drumhedz
"Giannis"	2019	Freddie Gibbs, Madlib	Bandana
"Gidget"	2019	Free Nationals	Free Nationals
"Lock It Up"	2020	Eminem	Music to Be Murdered By
"Don't Slack"	2020	Justin Timberlake	Trolls World Tour: Original Motion Picture Soundtrack
"It's All Love"	2020	Justin Timberlake, Mary J. Blige, George Clinton	Trolls World Tour: Original Motion Picture Soundtrack
"Just Sing"	2020	Justin Timberlake, Anna Kendrick, Kelly Clarkson, Mary J. Blige, Kenan Thompson, Kunal Nayyar	Trolls World Tour: Original Motion Picture Soundtrack
"Atomic Dog World Tour Remix"	2020	George Clinton and Parliament-Funkadelic, Mary J. Blige	Trolls World Tour: Original Motion Picture Soundtrack
"Just Sing (Finale)"	2020	Justin Timberlake, Anna Kendrick, James Corden, Kelly Clarkson, George Clinton, Mary J. Blige, Rachel Bloom, Kenan Thompson, Anthony Ramos, Red Velvet, Icona Pop, Sam Rockwell	Trolls World Tour: Original Motion Picture Soundtrack
"All Bad"	2020	Nas	King's Disease
"Guard Your Heart"	2020	Big Sean, Earlly Mac, Wale	Detroit 2
"Track 6"	2020	Ty Dolla Sign, Kanye West, Thundercat	Featuring Ty Dolla Sign
"Pitch Black"	2022	Chris Brown	Breezy
"Inner Peace"	2022	Chris Brown	Breezy
"Still Life"	2022	RM	Indigo
"Take a Chance"	2022	DOMi & JD BECK	NOT TiGHT
"Feel No Pain"	2022	Freddie Gibbs, Raekwon	Soul Sold Separately
"Here With Me"	2022	Mary J. Blige	Good Morning Gorgeous
"Let's Get Married"	2023	Justin Timberlake, Anna Kendrick, Zooey Deschanel, Kenan Thompson, Kunal Nayyar, Icona Pop, Ron Funches	Trolls Band Together: Original Motion Picture Soundtrack
"Gangsta"	2024	Free Nationals, A$AP Rocky	—N/a
"Ensalada"	2025	Freddie Gibbs, The Alchemist	Alfredo 2
"Play This Song"	2025	Mariah Carey	Here for It All

== Production discography ==
Title	Year	Artist(s)	Album	Credits	Written with	Produced with
"10 Rounds"	2012	Dumbfoundead	Take the Stares	Production	—N/a	Michael G. Gray
"Haven't You Heard?"	2013	TiRon & Ayomari	The Wonderful Prelude	Production	—N/a	-
"All You Can Do" (featuring Jimetta Rose)	2014	Watsky	All You Can Do	Production	—N/a	-
"Bet Against Me"	2014	Watsky	All You Can Do	Production	—N/a	-
"Whoa Whoa Whoa"	2014	Watsky	All You Can Do	Production	—N/a	Mr. Carmack and LODEF
"Right Now" (featuring Lisa Vitale)	2014	Watsky	All You Can Do	Production	—N/a	-
"My First Stalker"	2014	Watsky	All You Can Do	Production	—N/a	-
"The One"	2014	Watsky	All You Can Do	Production	—N/a	-
"Let's Get High and Watch Planet Earth"	2014	Watsky	All You Can Do	Co-writing and production	Watsky and Kelsey Gonzalez	Mr. Carmack
"Tears to Diamonds"	2014	Watsky	All You Can Do	Production	—N/a	-
"Grass Is Greener"	2014	Watsky	All You Can Do	Production	—N/a	-
"Never Let It Die"	2014	Watsky	All You Can Do	Production	—N/a	-
"Sarajevo" (featuring Dia Frampton)	2014	Watsky	All You Can Do	Production	—N/a	-
"Cannonball" (featuring Stephen Stills)	2014	Watsky	All You Can Do	Production	—N/a	-
"Loose Cannons" (featuring Xzibit, Cold 187um, and Sly Pyper)	2015	Dr. Dre	Compton	Additional vocals	—N/a	
"One Shot One Kill" (performed by Jon Connor featuring Snoop Dogg)	2015	Dr. Dre	Compton	Additional vocals	—N/a	
"Talking to My Diary"	2015	Dr. Dre	Compton	Additional vocals	—N/a	
"See I Miss"	2015	GoldLink	And After That, We Didn't Talk	Additional vocals	—N/a	
"Midnight Heart" (featuring Mal Devisa)	2016	Watsky	x Infinity	Co-writing and production	Watsky and Wax	Kush Mody
"I'M A GOD (내가)"	2017	TELISU	—N/a	Co-writing	TELISU	—N/a
"Anywhere"	2018	Mustard and Nick Jonas	—N/a	Co-writing	Mustard, Nick Jonas, Salva, Americo Garcia, and Jorge Medina	—N/a
"Sick of Sittin'"	2018	Christina Aguilera	Liberation	Co-writing, production, and background vocals	Christina Aguilera, Melvin Henderson, Whitney Phillips, and Janne Schaffer	Mell Beats
"Like I Do" (featuring GoldLink)	2018	Christina Aguilera	Liberation	Co-writing and production	Christina Aguilera, Dumbfoundead, Whitney Phillips, Tayla Parx, GoldLink, and BRLLNT	BRLLNT and Dumbfoundead
"I Don't Need It Anymore (Interlude)"	2018	Christina Aguilera	Liberation	Background vocals	—N/a	
"Till the World Falls" (featuring Mura Masa, Cosha, and Vic Mensa)	2018	Chic & Nile Rodgers	It's About Time	Co-writing, drums, and background vocals	Nile Rodgers, Anaïs Aida, Nao, Mura Masa, and Vic Mensa	—N/a
"My-Story of Love / Starring You"	2019	Shafiq Husayn	The Loop	Background vocals	—N/a	
"One Life"	2020	John Legend	Bigger Love	Co-writing, production, drums	John Legend, Cautious Clay, and Jeff "Gitty" Gitelman	Jeff "Gitty" Gitelman
"Yuuuu"	2020	Busta Rhymes	Extinction Level Event 2: The Wrath of God	Production	—N/a	
