= You Don't Know (Smoove & Turrell song) =

Single by Smoove & Turrell

from the album Antique Soul
- Released: 2009
- Label: Jalapeño Records
- Songwriters: Jonathan Scott Watson; John Turrell; Lynsey de Paul; Barry Blue

Smoove & Turrell singles chronology
"I Can't Give You Up" (2009)	"You Don't Know" (2009)	"Don't Go" (2009)

"You Don't Know" is a song by Smoove & Turrell, released both as a CD and 12 inch single, including remixes by Kraak & Smaak as well as Featurecast, on Jalapeño Records in 2009. It was also released as a track on the Smoove & Turrell 2009 album Antique Soul, as well as on the compilation album, Wavemusic: Soul Ya 3. "You Don't Know" was written by Jonathan Scott Watson (known as Smoove), John Turrell, Lynsey de Paul and Barry Blue, and sampled the track "Water" from de Paul's debut album, Surprise.

In an interview, Smoove said "I wanted a retro feel while keeping hip-hop production values in my beats. It reflects the different styles I play in my DJ sets - soul, latin, funk, jazz, easy listening, northern soul and hip hop. I'm a real crate digger and only play vinyl in my DJ sets. I found an amazing track by 70's songwriter Lynsey de Paul that we sampled for You Don't Know. Normally samples take forever to clear but someone played it directly to Lynsey and she loved it. We got everything cleared the same day". The song received positive reviews from the music press.

The song was play-listed on BBC Radio 6 Music and on The Craig Charles Funk and Soul Show. It was also played by DJs Mark Lamarr, Annie Nightingale, Janice Long and Mark Radcliffe, and it received favourable reviews. The song has also appeared on various compilation CD albums such as "White Lounge - Wintersun Sessions" (released in Austria on Musicpark Records), "Hotel Saint Tropez - Yaca 2" (released in Spain on Essential Records), "Sweet & Sweat - Best Of Volumes Three & Four" (released in Greece on the Planetworks label), "Club Tikka! Volume 3" (released in Germany on the Muto label) and "Jalapeno Funk Vol.2".

In March 2019, the song was included on the Smoove & Turrell greatest tracks compilation CD, Solid Brass: Ten Years of Northern Funk. One year later the song appeared on a re-released, limited, red & black splatter, 180-gram vinyl edition of "Antique Soul" that was the Wax Buyers Club Album of the month, April 2020.

On their 2020 album Stratos Bleu, Smoove & Turrell featured a track entitled "Still Don't Know", that is a remake of "You Don’t Know" and a dub mix is the last track on their 2021 "Stratos Bleu Dubs" album.
