= 2020 BET Hip Hop Awards =

Annual edition of the awards show

- Date: October 27, 2020
- Most wins: Megan Thee Stallion (3)
- Most nominations: DaBaby (12)

The 2020 BET Hip Hop Awards is a recognition ceremony that was held on October 27, 2020, as the 15th installment of the BET Hip Hop Awards. The nominations were announced on September 29, 2020. Hosted by Wild 'N Out cast members and hosts of 85 South Comedy Show podcast: Chico Bean, Karlous Miller and D.C. Young Fly.

DaBaby lead the number of nominations with twelve, with Roddy Ricch earning eleven, and both Megan Thee Stallion and Drake receiving eight each.

== Winners and nominees ==
=== Hip Hop Artist of the Year ===
Megan Thee Stallion

- DaBaby
- Drake
- Future
- Lil Baby
- Roddy Ricch

=== Hip Hop Album of the Year ===
Roddy Ricch – Please Excuse Me for Being Antisocial

- Future – High Off Life
- DaBaby – Blame It on Baby
- DaBaby – Kirk
- Lil Baby – My Turn
- Megan Thee Stallion – Suga

=== Best Hip Hop Video ===
Future featuring Drake – "Life Is Good"

- DaBaby – "Bop"
- DaBaby featuring Roddy Ricch – "Rockstar"
- Drake – "Toosie Slide"
- Lil Baby – "The Bigger Picture"
- Roddy Ricch – "The Box"

=== Best Collaboration ===
Megan Thee Stallion featuring Beyoncé – "Savage (Remix)"

- DaBaby featuring Roddy Ricch – "Rockstar"
- Future featuring Drake – "Life Is Good"
- Jack Harlow featuring Tory Lanez, DaBaby and Lil Wayne – "Whats Poppin (Remix)"
- Megan Thee Stallion featuring Nicki Minaj and Ty Dolla $ign – "Hot Girl Summer"
- Mustard featuring Roddy Ricch – "Ballin'"

=== Best Duo/Group ===
Chris Brown and Young Thug

- City Girls
- EarthGang
- JackBoys
- Migos
- Run the Jewels

=== Best Live Performer ===
Travis Scott

- Big Sean
- DaBaby
- Drake
- Megan Thee Stallion
- Roddy Ricch

=== Lyricist of the Year ===
Rapsody

- Big Sean
- DaBaby
- Drake
- J. Cole
- Megan Thee Stallion

=== Video Director of the Year ===
Teyana Taylor

- Cactus Jack & White Trash Tyler
- Cole Bennett
- Colin Tilley
- Dave Meyers
- Director X

=== DJ of the Year ===
D-Nice

- Chase B
- DJ Drama
- DJ Envy
- DJ Khaled
- Mustard

=== Producer of the Year ===
Hit-Boy

- 9th Wonder
- DJ Khaled
- JetsonMade
- Mike Will Made It
- Mustard

=== Song of the Year ===
"The Box" – Produced by 30 Roc and DatBoiSqueeze (Roddy Ricch)

Only the producer of the track nominated in this category.

- "Bop" – Produced by JetsonMade and Starboy (DaBaby)
- "Life Is Good" – Produced by Ambezza, D. Hill and OZ (Future featuring Drake)
- "Rockstar" – Produced by SethInTheKitchen (DaBaby featuring Roddy Ricch)
- "Savage (Remix)" – Produced by J. White Did It (Megan Thee Stallion featuring Beyoncé)
- "Toosie Slide" – Produced by OZ (Drake)

=== Best New Hip Hop Artist ===
Pop Smoke

- Flo Milli
- Jack Harlow
- NLE Choppa
- Mulatto
- Rod Wave

=== Hustler of the Year ===
Megan Thee Stallion

- Cardi B
- DJ Khaled
- JAY-Z
- Rick Ross
- Travis Scott

=== Sweet 16: Best Featured Verse ===
Beyoncé – "Savage (Remix)" (Megan Thee Stallion featuring Beyoncé)

- Bia – "Best on Earth" (Russ featuring Bia)
- Cardi B – "Writing on the Wall" (French Montana featuring Post Malone, Cardi B and Rvssian)
- Future – "Roses (Remix)" (Saint Jhn featuring Future)
- Travis Scott – "Hot (Remix)" (Young Thug featuring Gunna and Travis Scott)
- Roddy Ricch – "Rockstar" (DaBaby featuring Roddy Ricch)

=== Impact Track ===
Lil Baby – "The Bigger Picture"

- Anderson .Paak and Jay Rock – "Lockdown"
- J. Cole – "Snow on tha Bluff"
- DaBaby featuring Roddy Ricch – "Rockstar (BLM Remix)"
- Rapsody featuring PJ Morton – "Afeni"
- Wale featuring Kelly Price – "Sue Me"

=== Best International Flow ===
Stormzy (UK)

- Djonga (Brazil)
- Kaaris (France)
- Khaligraph Jones (Kenya)
- Meryl (France)
- Ms Banks (UK)
- Nasty C (South Africa)

=== Best Hip-Hop Platform ===
The Joe Budden Podcast

- HipHopDX
- HotNewHipHop
- XXL
- The Breakfast Club
- The Shade Room
- Complex

=== I Am Hip Hop Icon ===
Master P
