= The Craig Charles Funk and Soul Show =

The Craig Charles Funk & Soul Show
- Genre: Funk and soul music
- Running time: 180 minutes
- Country of origin: United Kingdom
- Language: English
- Home station: BBC Radio 6 Music
- Hosted by: Craig Charles
- Produced by: Ben Appleyard; Simon Hodge; Ellen Orchard
- Recording studio: Media City, Salford
- Original release: 15 March 2002
- Audio format: Digital radio, TV and internet
- Opening theme: "Homeboy", Maceo Parker
- Website: BBC Funk & Soul Show

The Craig Charles Funk and Soul Show is a British radio programme, broadcast on BBC Radio 6 Music on Saturdays between 18:00 and 21:00, and from 2016 until 2022 between 22:00 and midnight on BBC Radio 2 (dubbed the Craig Charles House Party). The Radio 6 Music show is presented live by Craig Charles and produced by Simon Hodge, Ben Appleyard and Ellen Orchard for Audio Always Ltd. All varieties of funk and soul music are played, from classic tracks to contemporary releases. It is the longest-running show on BBC Radio 6 Music.

== Programme format ==
The Craig Charles Funk and Soul Show plays classic and contemporary funk and soul music, as well as other genres such as Northern Soul, rhythm and blues, jazz, blues, gospel and hip hop.

The programme also includes interviews with artists, as well as text messages and phone-ins from listeners.

== Features ==
Regular features on the show:

- Talcum Time – a listener's three favourite Northern Soul songs played in a row.
- Trunk of Funk – playing thirty minutes of back-to-back funk hits.
- The History of Women in Funk and Soul – each week a well-known female funk and soul musician is chosen, with three tracks played.
- Spinage au Trois – a listener chooses their three favourite tracks to be played back-to-back.

Occasional features on the show:

- Fight Club – a well-known challenger takes on Charles' record collection, song against song, in themed rounds.
- 6 On 6 In 6 – a guest chooses six songs which are played in six minutes, with one song being played in full.
- Version Excursion – a great dance tune or remix at least 10 minutes long.

On the former BBC Radio 2 show:

- New to 2 – a track not previously played on Radio 2.
- Secret Soul Boy / Secret Soul Sister – a celebrity reveals their love of soul music by choosing tracks to be played.
- Cover From Another Brother/Mother and You Heard it Here First – a cover of a well-known song played back-to-back, with the original version of a song made famous by a cover.
- Additionally, Talcum Time was occasionally included on the Radio 2 show.

Former BBC 6 Music show features include:

- Slow Cooking – a listener's choice of romantic 'Get a Room Tune'.
- Cover From Another Brother/Mother – a cover version of a well-known track.
- The A to Z of Funk – listeners suggest songs, bands, record labels or anything else beginning with the letter of the week.
- World Funk Airways – educating listeners about funk bands from around the world.
- Choir Practice – playing a listener's two favourite gospel tracks in a row.
- The History of Black Music From 1899 – explaining the importance of the early track played.
- Songs You Don't Know – Lack of Afro asks listeners for further information on the obscure track played.
- 52 Weeks of Funk – a year-long countdown of Charles' favourite funk records.
- Hammond Time – Greg Boraman chooses a track for the Hammond organ.
- Soul Mining – the listening public dig deep for funk or soul records by artists they wouldn't expect to hear on the show.
- Betty's Hotpot – playing songs by "Bettys", inspired by Betty Driver who played Betty Williams in Coronation Street.
- Sub Zero – a "cool" funk or soul album is chosen, from which three tracks are played during the show.
- Re-souled covers – each week a different band performs a session and records a cover version of their chosen track from the featured album.
- Funk Log – highlighting a funk track originating from a different country.
- Facts of Funk – Charles profiles a group which is added to the dictionary, to show the diversity of the music.
- Three of a Kind – an in-depth look at a classic record label.
- Sample City – Charles demonstrates the funk roots of his favourite hip-hop artists.

Occasional specials, such as "The History of Black American Music from 1945" and 'The History of the Stax Record Label', feature the house band, The History Teachers, composed of Angelo Starr (vocals), Mick Talbot (keyboard), Ernie McKone (base guitar), Crispin Taylor (drums) and Julian Burdock (electric guitar).

== Notable guests ==
Special guests have included James Brown, George Clinton, Gil Scott-Heron, Bootsy Collins, Maceo Parker, Fred Wesley, Booker T, Chuck Brown and Candi Staton, along with members of bands such as Sly and the Family Stone, Kool & The Gang, The Isley Brothers and The Temptations. British artists have included Soul II Soul, Paul Weller and Primal Scream, James Taylor Quartet, The New Mastersounds, The Brand New Heavies, Cymande, Smoove & Turrell, Bluey of Incognito and Amy Winehouse.

== Production and history ==
The show was produced by TBI Media productions since March 2011 until 2025. In November 2011, the show began broadcasting from studios at the newly built MediaCityUK site, at Salford Quays, Greater Manchester, having relocated from the BBC Manchester Headquarters at New Broadcasting House in Manchester City Centre. The show has also aired from other BBC locations around the UK, and occasionally live from festival sites.

The programme was first broadcast on Friday 15 March 2002, during the first week of the station's launch, and was originally known as The Craig Charles Funk Show. In the early years of the network, the show aired twice weekly, on Friday and Saturday nights. The previous production company, from September 2006 until March 2011, was Demus Productions, with Hermeet Chadha as a producer and co-presenter, and the programme was also previously produced by Henry Lopez-Real.

== The Fantasy Funk Band ==
In 2007, as a long-running feature, Charles asked the show's listeners to vote for their perfect British funk band line-up. In 2009, to celebrate 75 years of the prestigious BBC Maida Vale Studios, Charles formed the Fantasy Funk Band from their suggestions. The band originally featured James Taylor of the James Taylor Quartet (Hammond organ), The Haggis Horns (horns), Eddie Roberts of New Mastersounds (guitar), Ernie McKone of Push (bass), Mike Bandoni of Funkshone (drums), John Turrell of Smoove and Turrell (male vocals), Dionne Charles of Baby Charles (female vocals), Chip Wickham (baritone sax/flute) and Snowboy (percussions /music director).

In 2010, the band's performances included Glastonbury, the Big Chill and Bingley festivals. In September 2010, Mick Talbot of The Style Council (Rhodes piano) joined the band and Leigh Gracie of Speedometer (guitar) replaced Eddie Roberts. In February 2012, the band came together again at the Maida Vale Studios, to rehearse and record an album in celebration of BBC 6 Music's 10th anniversary. Guest singers included The Magic Numbers, Lisa Stansfield, Omar, John Turrell, Jasmine Kara, Beverley Knight and Pat Kane of Hue and Cry. At Christmas, they played a concert at The Spiegeltent in Bristol.

The line-up for 2013 consisted of Mick Talbot (Hammond and Fender Rhodes), Snowboy (percussion), Mark Van der Gucht (guitar), Atholl Ransome (saxophone and flute), Jim Corry (tenor saxophone) and Malcolm Strachan (trumpet) of The Haggis Horns, Ernie McKone (bass), Mike Bandoni (drums), John Turrell (vocals), and Ria Currie (vocals). They played a variety of live events during the summer, including the Mostly Jazz, Funk & Soul festival, Craig Charles' Fantasy Weekender, and the BBC's Last Night 'Proms in the Park', with further appearances planned for 2014.

== The Craig Charles Funk & Soul Club ==
Since 2008, Charles has continuously toured The Craig Charles Funk and Soul Club, performing live DJ sets at nightclubs, festivals and special events throughout the UK and beyond.

Charles plays a mixture of well-known, classic funk and soul tracks, usually covered and remixed by current leading bands and DJs, along with the latest new danceable songs. Residencies have included Band on the Wall in Manchester, The Wardrobe and The Elbow Room in Leeds, Bloomsbury Bowling Lanes and Brixton Jamm in London, and The Lanes and Motion in Bristol.

Festivals have included Glastonbury (where Charles has also introduced acts and interviewed artists for BBC TV), WOMAD, The Cheltenham Jazz Festival, Kendal Calling, Big Chill, Limetree, Vintage at Goodwood and the Wickerman Festival, and Charles plays other diverse events such as Soundcrash Boat Parties and the SFX Weekender sci-fi convention. As well as performing as a DJ, Charles has compered and curated a day of the Mostly Jazz, Funk & Soul Festival, since the festival opened in 2010, and his band, The Fantasy Funk Band, also took to the stage in 2013. In 2013, Charles hosted his own festival, The Craig Charles Fantasy Weekender, where fellow 6 Music DJ Gilles Peterson also played. International gigs in 2013 included Australia, Croatia, Ibiza and Dubai.

Charles' first compilation album, The Craig Charles Funk and Soul Club, was released on Freestyle Records in 2012, in CD and digital download format, with a second volume following in 2013. To date (November 2018), six volumes have been released, together with a CD entitled Craig Charles' Soul and Funk Classics. The albums showcase music from leading artists of the genre that is played at the clubnights.
