= Rosana (song) =

Single by Wax

from the album Continue
- Released: July 2012
- Recorded: 2012
- Genre: Hip hop, pop
- Length: 3:54 (album version)); 3:30 (radio edit)
- Label: WM Germany
- Songwriters: Wax, Reginald Perry
- Producer: Nobody Famous

Wax singles chronology
"Summer Breeze" (2012)	"Rosana" (2012)

"Rosana" is a song by American rapper Wax. It was originally featured on Wax's mixtape Eviction Notice in November 2011. It was later released as a single in July 2012 but failed to chart. It also featured on the album Continue. The song was released throughout Europe in March 2013 and reached number one in Austria while peaking in the top ten in Germany, Luxembourg, Netherlands, Slovakia and Switzerland and charted in several other european territories. Rosana was produced by Nobody Famous.

== Music video ==
The video was published on YouTube in July 2012. It features Melissa Soria as Rosana, and was directed by Casey Chan. The concept of the video was brought up by Wax and Casey Chan. The video has Wax meeting a girl, fantasizing about her and starting a relationship together, while the viewer watches them in several scenes involving sexual innuendo (mostly with Mexican background musicians).

== Charts ==
=== Weekly charts ===
Chart (2012–13)	Peak position
Austria (Ö3 Austria Top 40)	1
Belgium (Ultratop 50 Flanders)	24
Germany (GfK)	7
Luxembourg Digital Songs (Billboard)	6
Netherlands (Dutch Top 40)	9
Netherlands (Single Top 100)	16
Poland Dance (ZPAV)	31
Slovakia Airplay (ČNS IFPI)	10
Slovenia (SloTop50)	34
Switzerland (Schweizer Hitparade)	7

=== Year-end charts ===
Chart (2013)	Position
Austria (Ö3 Austria Top 40)	8
Germany (Media Control AG)	38
Netherlands (Dutch Top 40)	51
Netherlands (Single Top 100)	100
Switzerland (Schweizer Hitparade)	36

== Certifications ==
Region	Certification	Certified units/sales
Austria (IFPI Austria)	Platinum	30,000^{*}
Germany (BVMI)	Gold	150,000^{^}
Switzerland (IFPI Switzerland)	Platinum	30,000^{^}
^{*} Sales figures based on certification alone.^{^} Shipments figures based on certification alone.

== Release history ==
Country	Release date	Format
United States	July 2012	Digital download, Radio airplay
Europe	March 29, 2013	Digital download, Radio airplay
