= Demus Productions =

Radio production company

Demus Productions was founded in 1994, making programmes for the BBC. They are currently the biggest independent radio production house in Scotland, making around 160 programmes each year for BBC Scotland, BBC Radio 2, as well as television programmes for BBC, STV and Channel 4.

Weekly strand radio shows on BBC Radio Scotland include the (Bronze) Sony Radio Award winning Janice Forsyth Show. Radio documentaries include a six-part jazz documentary on Verve Records founder Norman Granz for Radio 2, a four-part series The Scottish Suffragettes for BBC Radio Scotland using never-before-aired audio, Return to Goose Green (a soldier-turned-Church-of-Scotland minister's pilgrimage to the Falklands), The Sandmen Of the Gulf (about the first men to drill for oil in the Middle East) and The Herb Alpert Story for Radio 2, which included a rare interview with the man himself, one of the world's most successful songwriters.

In 2007, they completed the first series of The Atrocity Machine for Channel 4Radio, a sonic tapestry that many have described as "a shocking, incoherent mess". Working with some of the best talent around today, Demus work closely with three separate teams of writers and performers, producing The Lewis Lectures (a wry look back at famous historical moments), Pythonesque live sketch show Sabotage and the dark satire of The Franz Kafka Big Band for BBC Radio Scotland.

2008 saw BBC1 Scotland transmit their observational documentary The Whisky Dream, following the re-opening of Bruichladdich an historic distillery on the remote island of Islay.

One of the biggest ratings winners has been an emotional STV documentary following the highs and lows of arguably Scotland's toughest Sunday League Football teams. Other BBC TV documentaries include Vambo Rules, the story of the singer Alex Harvey, Full Cycle, a biopic of troubled cycling genius Graeme Obree who won four world titles on a bike built from a washing machine, as well as filming soul legend Dionne Warwick for The Gospel Channel in the United States.

They have also completed two series of Proud Parents for Channel 4 Daytime (features looking at celebrities through the eyes of their parents, letting the viewer witness emotional, touching encounters). These included Amir Khan, Aggie Mackenzie (How Clean Is Your House?), motorbike world champion James Toesland, Vic Reeves, Shobna Gulati (ex Coronation Street) and Carol Vorderman, starring alongside their parents.

Demus Productions has also produced the BBC 6Music Funk & Soul Show on a Saturday evening, presented by Craig Charles for the past four years though their tender has now came to an end.
