= Wax (rapper) =

American rapper

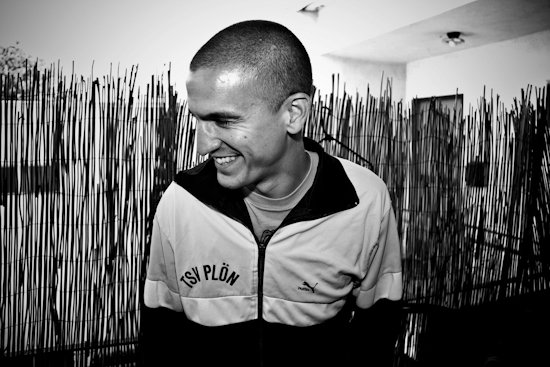
- Wax in Los Angeles, November 2010

Background information
- Born: Michael Jones; Washington, D.C.
- Origin: Dunkirk, Maryland, U.S.
- Genres: Hip hop; indie hip hop; underground hip hop; reggae fusion
- Occupations: Rapper; singer; songwriter; musician; producer; comedian
- Instruments: Vocals; guitar; bass guitar; drums; keyboards
- Years active: 2000–present
- Labels: AGP; Def Jam; Scrublife
- Website: waxdotcom.com

Michael Jones, better known by his stage name Wax, is an American rapper, singer, songwriter, musician, producer, and comedian. He became a YouTube star after uploading several videos of himself rapping and singing. He currently resides in Los Angeles, California. Wax is best known for his single "Rosana", which was released in 2012 and again in Europe in 2013. There it reached number one in Austria and top ten places in several other European countries.

== Early life ==
Jones is of Irish and Cuban descent and hails from Dunkirk, in Calvert County, Maryland. He grew up watching music videos and live performances on MTV. His biggest influences from his early childhood were Guns N' Roses and DJ Jazzy Jeff & The Fresh Prince. Soon after, in sixth grade, he picked up a guitar and started singing and rapping. Then, in middle school, he started listening to artists such as Eazy-E, N.W.A, and Too Short.

== Career ==
=== MacGregor ===
From 2000 to 2005, Jones was the lead vocalist and guitarist of the six piece band MacGregor. The band toured throughout the United States in the Midwest, the South, and New England, receiving a lot of local buzz in D.C. and Maryland. The group released two albums before entering a "super-extended" hiatus. They split because members had obtained other jobs or engaged in serious relationships. During this time, Wax also released his first solo EP, Biatch!

=== YouTube ===
In mid-2007, Jones and his twin brother, Herbal T, started posting videos of themselves rapping on YouTube. In early 2008, Wax made a name for himself after performing his song ("New Crack") over a Stephen Marley track called "Traffic Jam" while driving. The YouTube video has received over 2.2 million views. He also began to collaborate with other well known musicians on YouTube, such as Dumbfoundead and Prince Ea. After he cracked YouTube's Top 100 Musician list, his subscription base tripled and averaged about nearly 1,000 new subscribers each day. His videos have collectively garnered over 80 million views on his YouTube channel. The YouTuber Ray William Johnson then asked him to make an outro song titled "Stalkin Ya Mom". The two later collaborated on a song called "Orphan Tears". For Your Favorite Martian's comeback on June 10, 2022, they collaborated again on "Orphan Tears Part. 2". On December 15, 2014, he appeared in the Epic Rap Battles of History episode Steven Spielberg Vs. Alfred Hitchcock playing Quentin Tarantino. He later returned to ERB in 2019 in the episode Freddy Krueger vs Wolverine in which he portrayed Freddy Krueger.

=== Independent venture ===
Wax and Herbal T released their first album together, Grizzly Season, under AGP Records in 2006.

In 2008, an East Coast producer named EOM (Elements of Music) and Wax collaborated on a song called "The Adventures of Larry and Tina," written by Wax and produced by EOM. Eventually, they recorded and released a full album together, Liquid Courage, at the end of 2008. In 2010 Wax released Clockwise, a collaborative effort with Dumbfoundead and EOM.

On November 13, 2012, Wax announced a new album entitled "Continue..." that was released January 15, 2013.

On May 27, 2015, Wax announced that his next studio album would be called "Livin' Foul," and include an extended version of a previously unreleased song, "No Smoking in the House." The album was released on October 23, 2015.

=== Def Jam Recordings ===
In March 2011, Wax announced that he was signed to Def Jam Recordings by Max Gousse when he released a joint venture mixtape called Scrublife hosted by DJ Skee and Dale Firebird. EOM, The Fyre Department, Finatik N Zac and Jim Jonsin are featured guest boardworks for the mixtape. His lead single is a song called Dispensary Girl and the music video debuted on Entertainment Weekly a day before Scrublife released. Wax's debut LP with Def Jam Recordings was hinted to be released in October 2011, but on August 24, 2012, Wax announced on his YouTube channel that he had parted from Def Jam Recordings due to creative differences.

=== Podcast ===
In August 2012, Wax began doing a weekly podcast where he discusses a wide variety of issues. The podcast has a few segments on a consistent basis such as "Call Someone and Fuck With Them", "Recommendations from Wax", "Wax's True Hollywood Stories", and "Fan Questions". The Podcast has had many guests such as Wax's Twin Brother Herbal T, Producer EOM, comedian Todd Rexx and more. The average length of the podcast is about an hour, and is generally released every few weeks. As of May 31, 2017, Wax has released 141 podcasts.

== Discography ==
=== Studio albums ===
- Liquid Courage (November 25, 2008)
- Continue (January 15, 2013; Scrublife)
- Livin Foul (October 23, 2015; Scrublife)
- The Cookout Chronicles (September 2, 2016; Scrublife)
- B.A.A.A. (September 16, 2019; Scrublife)
- Lifetime Achievement Award (May 30, 2025)

=== Collaboration albums ===
- Beat Camp Tactics (with MacGregor), May 13, 2002
- Scatterbrain (with MacGregor), December 18, 2003, AGP Records
- Grizzly Season (with Herbal T), December 13, 2006, AGP Records
- Clockwise (with Dumbfoundead), May 31, 2010, Knocksteady
- Things Are Changin (with Eric Krasno), June 28, 2024, Feel Music Group
- Highway Hotel (with DJ Hoppa), June 6 2026, Not Sure

=== Live albums ===
- Wax Unplugged (Live from Los Angeles) (February 14, 2013; Scrublife)

=== EPs ===
- Biatch! (2003)
- Back In Business (2017) with Lack of Afro and Herbal T

=== Mixtapes ===
- Scrublife (March 15, 2011; Scrublife) – hosted by DJ Skee and Wax's fictional character Dale Firebird, the mixtape was released as a free digital download on DJ Booth.
- Eviction Notice (November 28, 2011; Scrublife) – released as a free digital download on DJ Booth.

=== Singles ===
Year	Song	Peak chart positions					Album
Year	Song	AT	CH	DE	NL	BE	Album
2008	"The Adventures of Larry and Tina"	—	—	—	—	—	Liquid Courage
2009	"Music and Liquor"	—	—	—	—	—	
2010	"Stay Offa My Facebook"	—	—	—	—	—	
2011	"Don't Need"	—	—	—	—	—	Scrublife
2011	"Dispensary Girl"	—	—	—	—	—	Scrublife
2011	"Two Wheels"	—	—	—	—	—	Scrublife
2011	"Too Loud"	—	—	—	—	—	Eviction Notice
2011	"Coins"	—	—	—	—	—	Eviction Notice
2012	"Rosana"	1	7	7	16	24	Continue
2012	"Toothbrush"	—	—	—	—	—	Continue
2013	"We All Can't Be Heroes"	—	—	—	—	—	Continue
2013	"I Shoulda Tried Harder"	—	—	—	—	—	Continue
2013	"She Used To Be Mine"	—	—	—	—	—	Continue
2013	"Feels Good"	—	—	—	—	—	Continue
2015	"Dreamin'"	—	—	—	—	—	Continue
2015	"This One's On Me"	—	—	—	—	—	Livin' Foul
2015	"Hypnotic"	—	—	—	—	—	Livin' Foul
2015	"The Meanest"	—	—	—	—	—	Livin' Foul

=== Guest appearances ===
- 2009: Lack Of Afro "International" (ft. Wax & Herbal T) from the album My Groove Your Move
- 2009: Lack of Afro "Suspicious Glow" (ft. Wax) from the album My Groove Your Move
- 2011: Lack Of Afro "P.a.r.t.y" (ft. Wax and Herbal T) from the album This Time
- 2011: Your Favorite Martian "Stalkin' Your Mom" (ft. Wax)
- 2011: Your Favorite Martian "Orphan Tears" (ft. Wax)
- 2011: Red Ribbon Army "Are You That Somebody" (Aaliyah Cover) (ft. Wax)
- 2012: The Palmer Squares "Bag It Up"(ft. Wax)
- 2012: Watsky & Kush Mody "Kick Monday" (ft. Wax)
- 2012: EOM "Summer Breeze" (ft. Wax, Herbal T, Dumbfoundead, Breezy Lovejoy) from the album For All We Know
- 2013: EOM "I'm On It" (ft. Wax) from the album For All We Know
- 2013: Watsky "Give a Hater a Hug" (ft. Wax)
- 2013: Herbal T "That's That" (ft. Wax) from the album Lo-Fi Blow Dry
- 2014: Epic Rap Battles of History "Steven Spielberg vs Alfred Hitchcock" (ft. Wax as Quentin Tarantino)
- 2015: DJ Hoppa "Grown" (ft. Devon Lee, Futuristic, Wax & Dizzy Wright) from the album Hoppa and Friends
- 2015: Spose "Lies Song" (ft. Wax & Shane Reis) from the album Why Am I So Happy?
- 2016: Watsky "Exquisite Corpse" from the album xInfinity
- 2017: Lack Of Afro "Back In Business" (ft. Wax & Herbal T) from the EP Back In Business
- 2018: Netflix's Cooking on High as a guest judge (Episode: "Southern Comfort")
- 2019: Epic Rap Battles of History "Freddy Krueger vs Wolverine"
- 2022: Your Favorite Martian "Orphan Tears Part 2 (ft. Cartoon Wax & Stevi the Demon)"
- 2022: Your Favorite Martian “Orphan Tears Part 3 (ft. Cartoon Wax & Stevi the Demon)”
- 2022: Your Favorite Martian “Uno Reverse (feat. Cartoon Wax)”
- 2022: Your Favorite Martian “Eff This Job (feat. Cartoon Wax)”
- 2022: Your Favorite Martian "This Is Why I'm Single (feat. Shuba and Cartoon Wax)"
- 2022: Your Favorite Martian "Rich People $hit (feat. Cartoon Wax)"
- 2023: Your Favorite Martian "Everyone Clapped (feat. Cartoon Wax)"

=== Music videos ===
- 10/08/2008 "The Adventures of Larry and Tina"
- 06/11/2009 "Music and Liquor"
- 06/22/2010 "Stay Offa My Facebook"
- 09/15/2010 "Crazy Ex"
- 02/10/2011 "Don't Need"
- 04/15/2011 "Dispensary Girl"
- 07/07/2011 "Two Wheels"
- 07/21/2011 "Coins"
- 12/14/2011 "Guess Who"
- 12/24/2011 "Need"
- 07/13/2012 "Rosana"
- 11/15/2012 "Toothbrush"
- 12/21/2012 "Lewis and Clark"
- 03/10/2013 "We Can't All Be Heroes"
- 06/27/2013 "I Shoulda Tried Harder"
- 07/22/2013 "She Used to be Mine"
- 10/15/2013 "Feels Good"
- 10/31/2013 "Good Night"
- 01/26/2015 "Dreamin"
- 06/04/2015 "No Smoking In The House"
- 08/27/2015 "This One's On Me"
- 10/28/2015 "The Meanest"
- 10/07/2016 "First Love"
