= Continue (Wax album) =

Continue...

Studio album by Wax
- Released: January 15, 2013
- Studio: Scrublife Studios (Venice, CA and North Hollywood, CA); Rough Magic Studios (Brooklyn, NY); Rocket Carousel Studios (Los Angeles, CA); Record Plant (Hollywood, CA)
- Genre: Hip-hop
- Label: Scrublife
- Producer: Adam Deitch; Davy Nathan; EOM; Eric Krasno; Greg Wells; King David "The Future"; Lack of Afro; Nobody Famous; Wax

Wax chronology
Eviction Notice (2011)	Continue... (2013)	Livin Foul (2015)

Singles from Continue...
- 1. "Rosana" Released: 2012

Alternate cover
- European release

Professional ratings
Review scores
Source	Rating
AllMusic	3.5/5 stars
laut.de	3/5 stars
RapReviews	7/10
XXL	L (3/5)

Continue is the second solo studio album by American rapper Wax. It was released on January 15, 2013 via Scrublife. Recording sessions took place at Scrublife Studios in Venice and North Hollywood, at Rough Magic Studios in Brooklyn, at Rocket Carousel Studios in Los Angeles and at Record Plant in Hollywood. Production was handled by Greg Wells, Davy Nathan, EOM, Lack of Afro, Adam Deitch, Eric Krasno, King David "The Future", Nobody Famous and Wax himself. It features guest appearances from Anderson .Paak and Herbal T. The album peaked at number 80 on the Swiss Albums chart. Its lead single, "Rosana", topped the Ö3 Austria Top 40 and reached to top ten in Germany, Switzerland and the Netherlands.

== Track listing ==
No.	Title	Writer(s)	Producer(s)	Length
1.	"Dreamin"	Michael Jones; Davy Nathan	Wax; Davy Nathan	3:16
2.	"Continue"	Jones; Nathan	Wax; Davy Nathan	5:02
3.	"Worked So Hard" (Interlude)	Jones	Wax	1:10
4.	"Get It In"	Jones; Eric Krasno; Adam Deitch	Adam Deitch; Eric Krasno	3:58
5.	"Tomorrow"	Jones; Greg Wells	Greg Wells	3:39
6.	"Rosana"	Jones; R. Perry	Nobody Famous	3:55
7.	"I Shoulda Tried Harder"	Jones; Nathan	Wax	4:19
8.	"We Can't All Be Heroes"	Jones	Lack of Afro	5:06
9.	"Stupefied"	Jones; Wells; Daniel Carey	Greg Wells; EOM (add.)	3:57
10.	"Toothbrush"	Jones; Wells	Greg Wells	3:02
11.	"She Used to Be Mine"	Jones; Wells	Greg Wells	2:58
12.	"Gin and Tap Water" (Interlude)	Jones	Wax	1:22
13.	"Straight to Paradise"	Jones; Carey	EOM	2:52
14.	"Outta My Mind"	Jones; D. Manzoor	King David "The Future"	3:57
15.	"Lewis and Clark" (featuring Herbal T)	M. Jones; Christopher Jones; Adam Gibbons	Lack of Afro	2:55
16.	"What's Your Vice?"	Jones; Nathan	Wax; Davy Nathan	4:06
17.	"Feels Good" (featuring Breezy Lovejoy)	Jones; Brandon Anderson; Carey; Nathan	EOM	4:52
18.	"I Ain't a Real Man (EOM Remix)" (Bonus Track)	Jones; Carey	EOM	4:22

== Charts ==
Chart (2013)	Peak position
Swiss Albums (Schweizer Hitparade)	80
