= Two Tens =

2023 single by Cordae featuring Anderson .Paak

Single by Cordae featuring Anderson .Paak

from the album The Crossroads
- Released: January 25, 2023
- Genre: Jazz rap
- Length: 2:32
- Label: Atlantic
- Songwriters: Cordae Dunston; Brandon Anderson; Jermaine Cole; Dwayne Abernathy, Jr.
- Producers: J. Cole; Dem Jointz

Cordae singles chronology
"Feel It in the Air" (2022)	"Two Tens" (2023)	"Doomsday" (2023)

Anderson .Paak singles chronology
"Still Life (RM song)" (2022)	"Two Tens" (2023)	"Daydreaming" (2023)

Music video
- "Two Tens" on YouTube

"Two Tens" is a single by American rapper Cordae featuring American rapper and singer Anderson .Paak. It was released on January 25, 2023 as the lead single from Cordae's third studio album The Crossroads (2024) and was eventually included on the album as a bonus track. Produced by J. Cole and Dem Jointz, the song is the second collaboration between the two rappers, following "RNP" in 2019.

== Background ==
In an interview with Genius, Cordae and Anderson .Paak revealed they wrote the song in the studio using a beat from a pack sent by J. Cole. Paak stated, "We both were really trying to impress each other with each line. But also, we really want to make a good song. It's not just two dudes battling each other."

== Composition ==
The production of the song has been described as "jazzy" neo-soul in style, over which the two artists trade four-bar sequences back and forth about the women they are attracted to and sexual exploits, while debating on love and discipline in life. Anderson .Paak, who performs the hook, takes on the role of a man who is overly infatuated with a woman, while Cordae tries to talk some sense into him, Although Cordae points out unwise decisions such as spending $10,000 on a Chanel bag and paying child support for ten kids, considers the value of extra attention, time and money involved, and laments his friend's actions, Paak is completely unbothered.

== Critical reception ==
Aron A. of HotNewHipHop wrote the song "marks another exceptional collaboration from the two rappers that will undoubtedly build more demand for a collaborative album." Chris DeVille of Stereogum praised the song, commenting "It's way more entertaining than I expected."

== Music video ==
The music video was directed by Edgar Esteves and Juan Felipe Zuleta and released alongside the single. It finds Cordae arriving at a nightclub, where he meets Anderson .Paak, as he narrates: "Me and my nigga Anderson decided to pull up to the club, and I don't even like going out, but if my nigga tell me pull up, I pull up easy, you know?" There, the rappers party with women, popping bottles and taking selfies with them, and find a couple of ones from the group whom they attract to. While Cordae "keeps things lowkey", Paak takes advantage of the surrounding luxuries and women, and is also seen "enjoying a bathroom rendezvous".

== Charts ==
Chart performance for "Two Tens"
Chart (2023)	Peak position
Canada (Canadian Hot 100)	74
New Zealand Hot Singles (RMNZ)	8
US Bubbling Under Hot 100 Singles (Billboard)	25
