= Smoove & Turrell =

British music group

Smoove & Turrell (Band)
- Origin: England
- Genres: Funk
- Years active: 2007–present
- Label: Jalapeno Records
- Members: Jonathan Scott Watson; John Turrell

Smoove & Turrell are a British group hailing from Gateshead in the North East of England. They play a style of music they describe as "Northern Funk" - a contemporary fusion of funk, soul, northern soul, hip-hop and electronica.

The band is composed of Jonathan Scott Watson (known as Smoove) and singer / songwriter John Turrell. The studio and touring band also includes founder member Mike Porter (Keyboards), Lloyd Wright (Guitar), Neil Harland (Bass) and Oscar Cassidy (Drums). Previous members include Athol Cassidy (Guitar), Andy Champion (Bass), Lloyd Croft (Drums), Dave Wilde (Sax) and Tim McVicar (Bass).

They have released seven studio albums: Antique Soul (Jalapeno Records, 2009), Eccentric Audio (Jalapeno Records, 2011), Broken Toys (Jalapeno Records, 2014), Crown Posada (Jalapeno Records, 2016), Mount Pleasant (Jalapeno Records, 2018), Stratos Bleu (Jalapeno Records, 2020) and Red Ellen (Jalapeno Records, 2023).

== History ==
The story of Smoove & Turrell began in the post millennium North East of England with a group of working class lads and a shared passion for soul. Smoove had met keyboardist Mike Porter through the local music scene in Newcastle and recruited him for his ‘Smoove Live’ project for the label Acid Jazz. Around Mike’s house one day they overheard a neighbour singing sublime melodies in his garage with friends which turned out to be none other than a young John Turrell practising in a band called ‘The Stevies’. After a couple of further sessions ‘scouting’ him they finally knocked on the door and had a chat and hit it off straight away.

A man of many facets, John Turrell was a skilled carpenter, working and teaching the trade to apprentices at a local college as well as his musical endeavours. After the trio performed several gigs together with various other guest musicians it was agreed they would create some new material and so they started to write and arrange a clutch of tracks that Smoove would record and produce.

The first Smoove & Turrell release was a limited edition 7" single called "I Can't Give You Up", issued in 2007 on German record label Club Tikka as a double A-side shared with "Curry Rice (Instrumental)" by Torpedo Boyz. It was recorded at Mike Porter’s house as his Hammond Organ, which features prominently on the track, was immovably wedged in his utility room! It gained underground popularity, particularly on Mod and Northern Soul forums and all 500 pressings of the record sold out. The resultant lack of supply started a notable bidding war for one copies on auction site eBay - one of which sold for £166. Upon completing the recording of their first album, the band's Live agent sent a copy to Jalapeno Records, who offered the band a deal within an hour of listening to it.

Ahead of the release of the debut album Antique Soul (2009), Jalapeño reissued the single "I Can't Give You Up". "You Don't Know" and "Beggarman" completed a trio of singles, taken from the album, that collectively earned two 'Record Of The Week' accolades on BBC Radio 2 and were playlisted on BBC Radio 6 Music. The band toured extensively to support the album, including an appearance at the Big Chill Festival.

It was in fellow soul head DJ Craig Charles that they found their first radio champion as he supported them heavily on ‘The Craig Charles Funk & Soul Show’ which was a kick-starter for their assault on national radio eventually landing Radio 2 record of the week twice and a playlist on BBC 6 Music.

In 2011, the band released its second album Eccentric Audio (also on Jalapeno Records). The first single to be taken from the album "Slow Down" reached number 1 in the iTunes Soul chart and was playlisted across national radio stations in the UK and Europe. The follow-up single "Hard Work" was also playlisted on BBC Radio 2 and played by Chris Evans and Graham Norton. The track also appeared on a TV commercial for Rust-Oleum. "Gabriel" was the final single to be taken from the album.

Smoove & Turrell tracks were used on US TV shows, feature films and an ABC network primetime advertising campaign, as well as in video games such as 'The Crew'. KCRW in LA put 'Hard Work' in their coveted Today’s Top Tune slot further exposing the band to west coast tastemakers and the boys becoming unlikely darlings of the US sync business.

The band capped off 2011 with live appearances on BBC Radio 2 on Christmas Eve and BBC Radio 6 Music on New Year's Eve.

2012 was spent touring and writing. They supported Nile Rodgers and Chic, and Martha and the Vandellas over the Summer festival season and put in an appearance at Space in Ibiza.

In 2014 the band released its third album on Jalapeño, entitled Broken Toys. Its release was preceded by the release of the single "Lay It On Me" and followed by "Will You Be Mine" and "Now or Never". The band formally launched the album at a gig at The Jazz Cafe in London. Following the album launch, the band embarked on a UK and European promotional tour - The Broken Toys tour - to support its release.

Respected DJ / label boss and producer Gilles Peterson played the title track on his BBC 6 Music show.

One notable show on 13 March 2015 saw the band play a secret acoustic gig at the North East Of England Institute Of Mining. The secret was the location of the gig, which was only revealed two days prior to the performance, in front of an audience of 100 fans. The band continued to tour in 2015.

By 2016 their extensive touring and appeal across borders was recognised by the BPI and the band were awarded Music for Export Growth Scheme funding to assist with an extended touring schedule. The band were invited to play Canadian Music Week and crowdfunded the necessary costs to take them there in just two days.

Album number four 'Crown Posada' was released in 2016, with the whole band involved in the writing process. An album which infused their northern soul and funk style with early electronica influences, rock, pop, disco and jazz whilst still maintaining the signature Smoove & Turrell sound.

Socially conscious lyrics are central to the themes explored by the band. These lyrics highlight the divide between the rich and the poor, and offer an insider’s look at what it’s like to grow up, live, and raise a family in the North East of England. '50 days Of Winter' offers a bleak picture of isolation after life on the road ends and reality kicks in.

As always though with Smoove & Turrell the highs and the lows of life are represented and the hard times realism of some of the lyrics is tempered by the irrepressible dancefloor euphoria of others. The album opener 'You Could Have Been A Lady' – a cover of the Hot Chocolate classic – being a prime example. The track was playlisted on BBC Radio 2 and BBC 6 Music and championed by DJ Chris Evans.

'Mount Pleasant' LP cover, Jalapeño Records (2018)

The Geordie soul crew returned in 2018 with a fifth album 'Mount Pleasant', after the success of Crown Posada, which gave the band multiple BBC Radio 2 playlists and 6 music spins. An album which, true to the band's style, draws on subject matters which are aimed to make us stop and think, with songs such as the politically charged ‘Hate Seeking Missile’, balanced fittingly with uplifting stompers, such as ‘There For Me’. The lead single 'You're Gone', a duet featuring John Turrell and Jalapeño Records stablemate, Izo Fitzroy, was again picked up by Gilles Peterson and played extensively by Craig Charles on BBC Radio 2. The follow-up single 'I Feel Alive' was released in June 2016. The euphoric track, which recalls a hedonistic night John Turrell spent in Paris, is backed with the On the B side is ‘Mr Hyde’ - a beast of a track that opens with energetic live drums and a standout organ riff, played by Mike Porter on his vintage Farfisa.

In May 2018 the band embarked on the 'Mount Pleasant Tour' to support the album, playing at venues throughout the UK and Europe.

Since April 2020, the duo present The Northern Coal Experience on Brighton based community radio station 1BTN.

In 2023, the band released its eighth album, Red Ellen.

== Band members ==
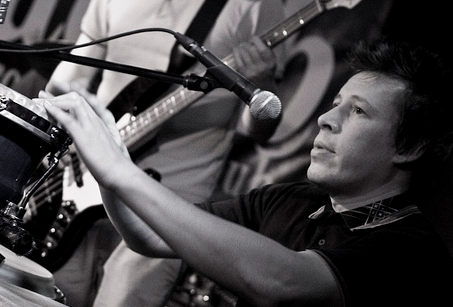
Smoove

Smoove (Jonathan Scott Watson) originally started out as a professional DJ in 1990, when he worked in bars and clubs, mainly in the Newcastle upon Tyne and Sunderland areas. In 1991 he began to make his own music - based on a blend of hip-hop, soul and funk - and released a single under the band name Ashbrooke All Stars entitled "Dubbin' Up The Pieces", on East West Records (a Warner Brothers imprint). The track, which was based on the Average White Band classic "Pick Up the Pieces" reached number 16 on the UK Dance Chart. In the years leading up to the formation of Smoove & Turrell his DJ career flourished, he presented a radio show - called Ultravibe - on Sunderland's Wear FM, fronted a Newcastle upon Tyne funk and hip hop band named Rubberneck and remixed music for other artists. A notable early remix of 'No Nose Job' by hip-hop band Digital Underground was commissioned by the Big Life record label.

Smoove's debut single "He Won't Get Far" was released on the Atomic Hi-Fi label as 12" picture disc, designed to resemble dusty, scratched vinyl. In 2004 he signed a deal with Acid Jazz records, releasing two albums Dead Men's Shirts (2005) and Gravy (2007). Outside of Smoove & Turrell he runs two record labels - Wack Records and Wass Records - and works as a music producer, remixer and DJ. His Wack label releases vinyl and digital EPs featuring mashups created by blending two or more pre-recorded songs. Smoove appears as his alter-ego S.M.O.V. on releases issued on the Wack label. The Wass Records label provides a platform for original music based around jazz, hip-hop and funk - but with a contemporary flavour. The label has released singles and albums by Renegades Of Jazz and Daytoner in both vinyl and digital formats.

In 2012, Smoove released First Class (on Jalapeno Records), his second compilation album of remixes he has produced for other artists (Gravy being the first).

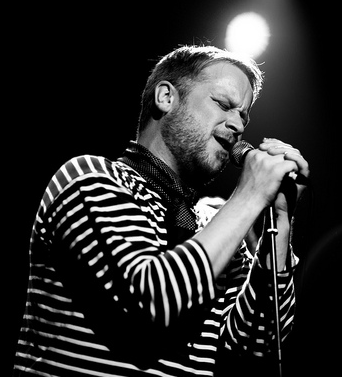
John Turrell

John Turrell is a vocalist and songwriter. He is also a skilled carpenter and a former lecturer at Newcastle College. He was lead vocalist of a band called The Stevies, prior to meeting Jonathan Watson and forming Smoove and Turrell. In 2010 listeners of The Craig Charles Funk & Soul Show on BBC Radio 6 Music voted for their Fantasy Funk Band and he was voted best funk male vocalist. Craig Charles subsequently got this funk dream team together to perform at the BBC's Maida Vale studios] for a radio broadcast.

Since the formation of Smoove & Turrell, he has collaborated with a number of artists on their own recordings, among these are The James Taylor Quartet, Kraak & Smaak, Ashley Beedle's, Mavis Project, and Fab Samperi.

He released his debut solo album, The Kingmaker, in 2013 on the Big Chill label. The album was reissued by Jalapeño Records and two digital-only EPs, 'The Kingmaker Remixed - parts 1 & 2' were released to support it.

== Live band ==
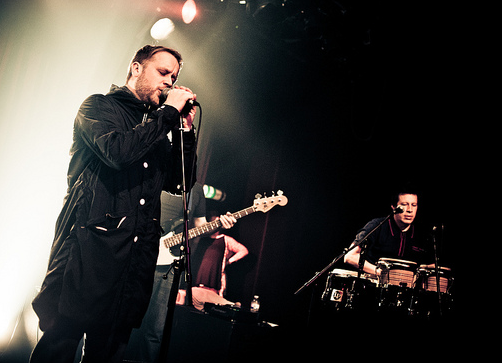

Smoove & Turrell have performed live throughout the world since 2009. They appear either as a duo (with John Turrell on live vocals and Smoove on decks and samples) or as a full live band. Keyboardist Mike Porter, as well as being one of the band's founders, is also its longest serving touring member.

The band has played many festivals including Glastonbury in 2010. They have recorded many live radio sessions on UK and European stations including BBC Radio 2, BBC Radio 6 Music, and BBC Radio Newcastle.

== Discography ==
=== Singles and EPs ===
- "I Can't Give You Up" (2007) (AA side 7" single shared with Torpedo Boyz) - issued as 'Club Tikka 45 Vol. 1' (Muto Records, MUTO008, Germany) - limited edition of 500 pressings.
- "I Can't Give You Up" (2009) (Jalapeno Records, JAL 72, 12" single and download)
- "You Don't Know" (2009) (Jalapeno Records, JAL 78, 12" single and download)
- "Don't Go" (2009) (Jalapeno Records, JAL 79, limited edition 7" single)
- "Beggarman" (2009) (Jalapeno Records, JAL 85, 12" single and download)
- "Slow Down" / "Broke" (2011) (Jalapeno Records, JAL 116, download)
- "Hard Work" / "Money" (2011) (Jalapeno Records, JAL 121, download)
- "Hard Work" / "Slow Down" (2011) (Wass Records, WASS-004, limited edition (400 copies) 7" white label promo with hand-stamped 'Barnum and cockerel' logo)
- "Gabriel" (2011) (Jalapeno Records, JAL 125, download)
- "In Deep" (2012) Jalapeno Records, JAL 122, 12" single and download)
- "Lay It On Me" (2014) Jalapeño Records
- "Will You Be Mine EP" (2014) Jalapeño Records
- "Now Or Never" (2014) Jalapeño Records
- "You Could've Been a Lady" (2016) Jalapeño Records
- "No Point In Trying" (2016) Jalapeño Records
- "You're Gone" (feat. Izo Fitzroy) (2018) Jalapeño Records
- "I Feel Alive" (2018) Jalapeño Records

=== Albums ===
- Antique Soul (2009) (Jalapeno Records, vinyl JAL 75V, CD JAL75CD and download JAL75)
- Eccentric Audio (2011) (Jalapeno Records, vinyl JAL112V, CD JAL112CD and download JAL112)
- Broken Toys (2014) (Jalapeno Records, vinyl JAL178V, CD JAL178CD and download JAL178)
- Crown Posada (2016) (Jalapeno Records)
- Mount Pleasant (2018) (Jalapeno Records)
- Solid Brass: Ten Years Of Northern Funk (2019) (Jalapeno Records)
- Stratos Bleu (2020) (Jalapeno Records)
- Red Ellen (2023) (Jalapeno Records)
