= Saturday Mornings =

2024 single by Cordae featuring Lil Wayne

Single by Cordae featuring Lil Wayne

from the album The Crossroads
- Released: July 24, 2024
- Genre: Hip-hop
- Length: 4:23
- Label: Art@War; Atlantic
- Songwriters: Cordae Brooks; Dwayne Carter Jr.; Darian Garcia; Jahmal Gwin; Nicholas Smith
- Producers: Smoko Ono; BoogzDaBeast

Cordae singles chronology
"Tough Decisions PT. 2" (2023)	"Saturday Mornings" (2024)	"Summer Drop" (2024)

Lil Wayne singles chronology
"You Will Respect Me" (2024)	"Saturday Mornings" (2024)	"Ya Don't Stop" (2024)

Music video
- "Saturday Mornings" on YouTube

"Saturday Mornings" is a song by American rapper Cordae, released on July 24, 2024, as the second single from his third studio album, The Crossroads (2024). It features American rapper Lil Wayne and was produced by Smoko Ono and BoogzDaBeast.

== Composition ==
The production uses a chopped soul sample and drums. Cordae and Lil Wayne respectively perform the first and second verses. Lyrically, the rappers address wanting to be around honest people in life. Furthermore, Cordae mentions his close relationship with rapper Jay-Z and raps about his ambitions for 2024, and Lil Wayne asserts his status as the "G.O.A.T." Cordae references American rapper Rod Wave, saying: “Feelin’ like Rod Wave, got a lot on my plate”, which critics described as highly disrespectful to Wave and one of the funniest rap lyrics of 2024.

== Critical reception ==
The song received generally positive reviews. Will Schube of HipHopDX praised the production for "providing the perfect backdrop for the two lyricists to trade braggadocious bars" and called Lil Wayne's verse "show-stealing". Comparing the song to their previous collaboration "Sinister", Zachary Horvath of HotNewHipHop wrote "we feel that 'Saturday Mornings' might be the stronger one of the two. From the extremely soulful production to the rappers' effortless change in tone, this song has it all." Elaina Bernstein of Hypebeast remarked the song "sounds like what a Saturday morning should sound like. A soulful sample carries the melody, with Cordae and Weezy spitting smartly written bars atop it." Shawn Grant of The Source described the rappers as "exchanging high-level lyrical bars for over four minutes, elevating their rap game."

== Music video ==
The music video was released alongside the single and directed by APLUS. It shows the rappers outside of an airplane hangar, as well as footage of the recording process of Cordae's upcoming album.

== Charts ==
Chart performance for "Saturday Mornings"
Chart (2022)	Peak position
New Zealand Hot Singles (RMNZ)	37
US Hot R&B/Hip-Hop Songs (Billboard)	41
