= The Crossroads (album) =

Studio album by Cordae
- Released: November 15, 2024
- Recorded: 2024
- Length: 48:09
- Labels: Art@War; Atlantic
- Producers: Alex Goldblatt; Angwang Jin; Ashton Sellars; Biako; BongoByTheWay; BoogzDaBeast; Camper; Cordae; Darko; Dem Jointz; Dkjbeats; Don Mills; D. Phelps; Elkan; FnZ; Hitmaka; Illuid Haller; Jaasu; J. Cole; Johan Lenox; Linden Jay; Ryan James Carr; Smoko Ono; Tarron Crayton; Thelonious Martin; Tommy Parker

Cordae chronology
From a Birds Eye View (2022)	The Crossroads (2024)	Heavy Is the Crown (2026)

Singles from The Crossroads
- 1. "Two Tens" Released: January 25, 2023; 2. "Saturday Mornings" Released: July 24, 2024; 3. "Summer Drop" Released: August 28, 2024; 4. "Mad as Fuck" Released: October 11, 2024; 5. "Syrup Sandwiches" Released: November 7, 2024

Professional ratings
Review scores
Source	Rating
AllMusic	4/5 stars

The Crossroads is the third studio album by the American rapper Cordae, released through Art@War and Atlantic Records on November 15, 2024. The album has guest appearances from Anderson .Paak, Joey Badass, Jordan Ward, Juicy J, Kanye West, Lil Wayne, Ravyn Lenae, and Ty Dolla Sign. Several producers worked on the album, including FnZ, Hitmaka, J. Cole, Thelonious Martin, Cordae himself, and others. His previous studio album was From a Birds Eye View (2022).

== Background and recording ==
Before the release of the album, Cordae told Billboard that it was his strongest work yet. "I think it’s ready. I think I’m better than I’ve ever been as an artist". He said he had spent the time since releasing his previous album to live, "access life", and grow as an artist.

I wanted to get better, like, as a songwriter, as a rapper. I wanted my verses to be better. I wanted my storytelling to be better. I wanted my beat selection and taste in beat selection to get better, and that requires work and time, so I feel like this is my best foot forward thus far.

Asked about the album's title, Cordae said that he had reached a turning point where he felt as though he was at a crossroads in life: "It was like life or death. … If I go right, everything is gonna be perfect and yay, life is great, and if I go left, all life is horrible. I’ve kinda realized that one decision doesn’t hold that much weight. It’s a culmination of decisions".

== Release and promotion ==
On January 25, 2023, Cordae released the album's lead single, "Two Tens" featuring Anderson .Paak. The album's second single, "Saturday Mornings" featuring Lil Wayne was released on July 24, 2024. The album's third single, "Summer Drop" featuring Anderson .Paak was released on August 28, 2024. The record's fourth single, "Mad as Fuck" was released on October 11, 2024. The album's fifth single, "Syrup Sandwiches" featuring Joey Badass was released on November 7, 2024.

== Track listing ==
The Crossroads track listing
No.	Title	Writer(s)	Producer(s)	Length
1.	"Intro"	Cordae Dunston; Anthony Cowan; Anthony Henderson; Byron McCane; Charles Scruggs; Cristopher Jasper; Ernest Isley; Marvin Isley; O'Kelly Isley Jr.; Ronald Isley; Rudolph Isley; Steven Howse; Tim Middleton	Biako; D. Phelps; Smoko Ono; Tommy Parker	1:10
2.	"06 Dreamin"	Dunston; Darian Garcia; Isaac De Boni; Michael Mulé; Ashton Sellars; Jennifer Duston	Dunston; Smoko Ono; FnZ; Tommy Parker^{[b]}; Ashton Sellars^{[b]}	2:34
3.	"Back on the Road" (featuring Lil Wayne)	Dunston; Dwayne Carter Jr.; Garcia; Milos Angelov	Smoko Ono; Don Mills	2:37
4.	"Summer Drop" (featuring Anderson .Paak)	Dunston; Brandon Anderson; Jermaine Cole; Dwayne Abernathy, Jr.; Alana Chenevert; Kelsey Gonzalez; Ayanna McNeil; Chris Galland; Nili Harary	J. Cole	2:49
5.	"Nothings Promised"	Dunston; Uforo Ebong; Eric Hudson; Ye; Adam Levine; Gerald Goffin; Michael Masser	BongoByTheWay; Eric Hudson^{[b]}	3:32
6.	"Mad as Fuck"	Dunston; Garcia; Julius Herold; Paul Agyei	Smoke Ono; Darko; Elkan	3:42
7.	"All Alone"	Dunston; Garcia; Angwang Jin; Illuid Haller; Burt Bacharach; Hal David; Itai Shapira	Smoke Ono; Angwang Jin; Illuid Haller; Biako^{[b]}	1:53
8.	"Never See It" (featuring Juicy J)	Dunston; Jordan Houston III; Garcia; Jaasu Mallory; Barbara Mason	Smoko Ono; Jaasu	3:28
9.	"Pray" (featuring Ty Dolla Sign)	Dunston; Tyrone Griffin Jr.; Garcia; Darhyl Camper Jr.; Charles Fox; Christian Dotson; Christian Ward; Norman Gimbel	Camper; Hitmaka	3:22
10.	"Don't Walk Away" (featuring Jordan Ward and Ravyn Lenae)	Dunston; Jordan Ward; Ravyn Lenae; Garcia; Alex Goldblatt; Linden Berelowitz; Carr; Federico Vindver	Smoko Ono; Alex Goldblatt; Linden Jay; Ryan James Carr	3:32
11.	"Saturday Mornings" (featuring Lil Wayne)	Dunston; Carter; Garcia; Jahmal Gwin; Nicholas Smith	Smoko Ono; BoogzDaBeast	4:23
12.	"No Bad News" (featuring Kanye West)	Dunston; Ye; Garcia; Gwin; De Boni; Mulé; Malcolm Martin; Dominic Salole; Esau Joyner Jr.; Joey Dosik; Miguel Atwood-Ferguson	Smoko Ono; BoogzDaBeast; FnZ; Thelonious Martin	2:32
13.	"Shai Afeni"	Dunston; Garcia; Mallory; Shapira; Thomas Lumpkins; Bobby Eli; Jeff Prusan	Smoko Ono; Jaasu; Biako^{[a]}; Tommy Parker^{[a]}	2:56
14.	"What Really Matters"	Dunston; Garcia; Shapira; Daniel Johnson; Lumpkins; Doug Edwards; Thomas Richardson	Smoko Ono; Biako; Dkjbeats; Tommy Parker^{[b]}	2:03
15.	"Syrup Sandwiches" (featuring Joey Badass)	Dunston; Jo-Vaughn Scott; Garcia; Martin; Jabari Rayford; Lydia Kitto	Smoko Ono; Thelonious Martin	2:59
16.	"Now You Know"	Dunston; Ebong; Stephen Feigenbaum; Tarron Crayton	BongoByTheWay; Johan Lenox^{[b]}; Crayton^{[b]}	2:11
17.	"Two Tens" (featuring Anderson .Paak) (Bonus Track)	Dunston; Anderson; Cole; Abernathy; Gerald Wilson	J. Cole; Dem Jointz	2:32
Total length:				48:09

Notes

- ^{^[a]} signifies a co-producer
- ^{^[b]} signifies an additional producer

Sample credits

- "Intro" contains a sample of "Tha Crossroads (D.J. U-Neek’s Mo Thug Remix)", written by Steven Howse, Anthony Henderson, Byron McCane, Charles Scruggs, Tim Middleton, Ernest Isley, Marvin Isley, O'Kelly Isley Jr., Ronald Isley|Rudolph Isley, and Cristopher Jasper, as performed by Bone Thugs-n-Harmony.
- "Nothings Promised" contains a sample of "Someone That I Used to Love", written by Michael Masser and Gerry Goffin, as performed by Natalie Cole; and interpolations from "Heard 'Em Say", written by Masser, Goffin, Ye, and Adam Levine, as performed by Kanye West and Adam Levine.
- "All Alone" contains a sample of "A House Is Not a Home", written by Burt Bacharach and Hal David, as performed by Luther Vandross.
- "Never See It" contains a sample of "Who'd Ever Think", written by Ronnie Baker, as performed by Barbara Mason.
- "Pray" contains a sample of "Killing Me Softly with His Song", written by Charles Fox, Norman Gimbel, and Lori Lieberman, as performed by Fugees.
- "Saturday Mornings" contains a sample of "I Really, Really Love You", written by Nick Smith, as performed by Father's Children.
- "No Bad News" contains a sample of "Inside Voice (Reprise)", written and performed by Joey Dosik.
- "Shai Afeni" contains a sample of "Keep It Comin'", written by Bobby Eli and Jeff Prusan, as performed by Atlantic Starr.
- "What Really Matters" contains a sample of "Wild Flower", written by Doug Edwards and David Richardson, as performed by New Birth.

== Personnel ==
Musicians

- Cordae – vocals
- Tommy Parker – background vocals (tracks 1, 2, 13, 14)
- Brandy Haze – background vocals (tracks 2, 5, 15)
- Dem Jointz – background vocals (track 4)
- The Last Artful, Dodgr – background vocals (track 4)
- Alex Vaughn – background vocals (tracks 5, 9)
- Lekan – background vocals (tracks 5, 16)
- Darius Coleman – background vocals (track 13)
- Jabari Rayford – background vocals (track 15)
- Lydia Kitto – background vocals (track 15)
- Caleb McLaughlin – background vocals (track 16)
- Ashton Sellars – guitar (track 2)
- Kelsey Gonzales – bass (track 4)
- Linden Jay – bass (track 10)
- Ryan James Carr – drums (track 10)
- Alex Goldblatt – guitar (track 10)
- Dominique Sanders – live bass (track 12)
- Johan Lenox – strings (track 16)

Technical

- Zach Pereyra – mastering (tracks 1–16), mixing assistance (tracks 2–4, 6, 8, 9, 11, 13, 14)
- Emerson Mancini – mastering (17)
- Manny Marroquin – mixing (tracks 2–4, 6, 8, 9, 11, 13, 14)
- Elton "L10" Chueng – mixing (tracks 5, 7, 10, 12, 15, 16)
- Chris Galland – mixing (track 5)
- Jeremie Inhaber – mixing (track 17)
- Anthony Vilchis – mixing assistance (tracks 2–4, 6, 8, 9, 11, 13, 14)
- Trey Station – mixing assistance (tracks 2–4, 6, 8, 9, 11, 13, 14)
- Daniel Vargas – mixing assistance (tracks 5, 7, 12, 15, 16)
- Robert Mendioro – mixing assistance (tracks 5, 7, 12, 15, 16)
- Luca Zadra – engineering (tracks 1, 2, 5, 7, 14)
- Mesa D – engineering (tracks 1–3, 5, 7, 8–10, 12–16)
- Shaan Singh – engineering (tracks 1–3, 5, 7, 10, 14, 17)
- Bryan Schwaller – engineering (track 10)
- Jhair Lazo – engineering (track 17)

== Charts ==
Chart performance for The Crossroads
Chart (2024–2025)	Peak position
Hungarian Physical Albums (MAHASZ)	28
US Billboard 200	143
