= Indigo (RM album) =

- Digital cover

Studio album by RM
- Released: December 2, 2022
- Recorded: 2019–2022
- Length: 32:07
- Languages: Korean; English
- Label: Big Hit
- Producers: Logikal J; Ghstloop; Ninos Hanna; Emil Schmidt; Adam Kulling; Pdogg; John Eun; Honne; EAeon; Docskim

RM chronology
Mono (2018)	Indigo (2022)	Right Place, Wrong Person (2024)

Singles from Indigo
- 1. "Wild Flower" Released: December 2, 2022; 2. "Still Life" Released: December 6, 2022

Indigo is the debut studio album by South Korean rapper RM of BTS, released on December 2, 2022, through Big Hit Music. The album marks the rapper's first full-length body of work since Mono (2018) and serves as a documentation or archive of his late twenties. Comprising 10 tracks, it includes appearances by Erykah Badu, Anderson .Paak, Tablo of Epik High, Kim Sa-wol, Paul Blanco, Mahalia, Colde, Youjeen of Cherry Filter, and Park Ji-yoon. The ninth track, "Wild Flower", a collaboration with Youjeen, was released alongside the album as its lead single, together with an accompanying music video.

The album peaked at number two in South Korea; number three in Lithuania, Portugal, and the United States—the highest-charting album by a Korean soloist on the Billboard 200 at the time; (Note: This record was later surpassed by BTS bandmate Jimin, who peaked at number two with his debut studio album Face in April 2023.) and number four in Japan. Indigo was certified double platinum by the Korea Music Content Association in January 2023 and has sold over 800,000 copies domestically as of July 2023, and over 100,000 units in the US.

== Background ==
In June 2022, during BTS' ninth anniversary celebrations, after announcing that the band members would be devoting more attention to individual music projects going forward, RM spoke about dealing with creative burnout and losing his sense of direction following the release of the band's fourth studio album Map of the Soul: 7 (2020) and the single "Dynamite". He explained that the pressure from being part of the K-pop industry, to constantly produce music, had made it difficult for him to grow and mature as an artist, and that he needed time to think and rediscover his musical identity—it had become harder to balance his personal artistic works with the demands of his role in the band. RM additionally said he wanted audiences to get to know the band members, including himself, as separate entities, outside of the BTS collective, and revealed they all had solo music in the works that they were preparing to release.

During a personal livestream held on Weverse in July, he shared updates about the progress of his own album, stating that it was nearing completion, about "90 percent done", and all that was left was the filming of music videos and additional content to be released alongside the album. He also explained that the music would be very different to 2018's Mono: "If 'Mono' recorded my 2016 to '18, then I think this new album serves as my diary and archive for 2019 to '22."

== Release ==
On November 10, during Hybe Corporation's annual community briefing on YouTube, CEO Jiwon Park announced that RM would be the third member of BTS—after J-Hope and Jin—to release a solo project, his debut album. RM subsequently posted a series of Instagram stories containing the album's title and release date—Indigo, December 2, 2022—as well as the fact that he had begun working on the album since the beginning of 2019. In a follow-up post on Weverse, he mentioned "working hard on it for the past four years" and that "fun friends" were included, seemingly hinting at collaborations on the album. The official announcement notice from Big Hit Music, posted on the platform shortly afterwards, confirmed collaborations with various artists, but did not publish any names. The cover artwork for the album, "a photo of a blue fabric swatch with the album title bleached in white", was shared by Big Hit later in the day. Two days later, RM unveiled more photos hinting at the overall mood of the album via his social media, first posting a photo of a spacious room with wooden furniture bathed in warm-toned light, followed by an Instagram story of an image with the phrase "the last archive of my twenties" set against a painted blue background. He shared a preview of the album's external packaging via Instagram on November 14, several hours before preorders began.

RM's first official solo release, but third overall after his eponymous mixtape in 2015 and Mono in 2018, Indigo recounts "stories and experiences [he] has gone through, like a diary." The preorder period for the album opened on November 15. Big Hit released an "Identity Film" for the project on November 22. In line with the album's title, the blue-tinted visual featured "a rapidly paced montage of vague images" with the sound of static playing in the background. Descriptive text about the album appeared as the clip progressed: "Record of RM : Indigo. From the colors of nature, human, etc. Documentation of my youth in the moment of independent phase. Sun-bleached record faded like old jeans". The final line of text read: "the last archive of my twenties", before the video "gracefully faded out". Five teaser photos followed the next day and showed RM, dressed in blue denim and all-white outfits, standing and sitting in the same warm-toned, light-filled room from the previously shared mood images. The painting Blue, by the late Korean artist Yun Hyong-keun (whom RM is known to be an admirer of), featured in some of the photos. RM has said that with Indigo he created a collaboration that "transcends boundaries" between music and art. Big Hit revealed the tracklist on November 24. The album comprises 10 songs and includes appearances by Erykah Badu, Anderson .Paak, and Tablo, among others.

=== Format ===
Two editions of the album were made available for purchase. The "Book Edition" was released in traditional CD format and includes a book, postcard, photocard, and poster. The Target and Weverse Shop USA exclusive versions of this edition contained an additional photocard each. The "Postcard Edition" comprises a lyric book, instant photo, User Guide, and scannable QR guide to access the digital version of the album on Hybe's music streaming app, Weverse Albums, and additional digital content exclusive to that platform.

=== Singles ===
The album's ninth track, "Wild Flower", (Note: also translated as "Playing with Wildflowers" or "Wild Flower Play") which features vocals by Youjeen of Cherry Filter, was announced as the album's lead single on November 25, 2022. A preview clip for the single's music video was shared via YouTube on November 30. The teaser was nature-based, first showing a "serene field of wheat", followed by "RM walking on a plain and admiring the sunrise", then cutting to an overhead view of the clouds lit up from below "with pockets of lighting", before ending with a wide angle shot of RM standing atop a mountain next to a lone tree as "atmospheric drum and synth beats" played in the background. The full music video premiered simultaneously on YouTube in conjunction with the single's global digital release on December 2—Youjeen does not appear in the video.

"Wild Flower" debuted at number 75 on the week 49 issue of the Circle Digital Chart in South Korea, for the period dated November 27–December 3, 2022, and numbers 4 and 193 on the corresponding issues of the component Download and Streaming charts respectively. It debuted at number 24 on Oricon's Weekly Digital Singles Chart in Japan with 3,046 downloads sold, for the period dated November 28–December 4, 2022. In the United States, the single accrued 4.1 million streams and sold 29,000 downloads in its first tracking week (period dated December 2–8), and went on to debut at number 83 on the Billboard Hot 100 issue dated December 17, earning both RM and Youjeen their first solo entries on the chart. It was also the best-selling song for that period and topped the corresponding issue of the Digital Songs chart. The single debuted at number one on the genre-specific World Digital Song Sales chart, earning RM his fourth number one overall on the ranking.

Dazed listed "Wild Flower" at number 17 on its year-end ranking of the 40 best K-pop songs released in 2022, with music writer Taylor Glasby stating that the song's position on the list was "a testament to [its] powerful and emotive immediacy". She described it as a "beautifully paced, produced and performed snapshot of a superstar's psyche, as fascinating as it is profoundly stirring." The single was later nominated in the Best Music (Winter) category at the 2023 Fact Music Awards.

== Promotion ==
RM discussed Indigo in in-depth interviews with NME, Variety, and The Atlantic published the day of the album's release. He made his solo performance debut on NPR's Tiny Desk Concert shortly afterwards. The rapper's 3-song set opened with "Seoul" from his Mono (2018) mixtape, followed by the first two tracks from the album: "Yun" and "Still Life". RM also guested on a two-part episode on the Melon Station radio series where he talked about producing the album, his collaborations, shared behind-the-scenes anecdotes, and participated in a Q&A. An exclusive "Ask Me Anything" video was also released.

=== Performances ===
==== Live in Seoul ====
A small, commemorative music event was held at Rolling Hall in Hongdae, Seoul on December 5. Two hundred fans were selected via lottery on Weverse—winners were announced on November 24—from among those who preordered the album, to participate in the event, which was recorded for subsequent promotional video content. RM performed eight of the album's 10 tracks in addition to two of his other previously released songs. Featuring guest appearances by Paul Blanco, Kim Sa-wol, Colde, and Youjeen, the show was uploaded to the official BTS YouTube channel for free viewing later that month.

==== Live in Dia Becon ====
In keeping with Indigo's underlying theme of promoting "harmony between music and art", RM recorded a mini concert special at the Dia Beacon art museum in New York. The 12-minute-long video premiered on YouTube on December 8, 2022, and comprised four selections from the album: "Wild Flower", "Still Life", "Change Pt.2", and "No. 2". The opening performance took place in the venue's exterior garden before progressing through various interior art installation spaces for the remaining songs. RM first visited the museum while on vacation in December 2021 and the experience inspired him to broach the idea of filming there.

"I thought ["Still Life"] could resonate with the artwork perfectly because you know it's a whole kind of transformation"... Dia Beacon had transformed the former box factory into a 'magical', 'charming' and 'fascinating' place. "The way the light touches the surface of the artworks, it's just visually amazing...I absolutely wanted to do a live performance along his [Richard Serra's] artworks in Dia Beacon because his artworks are kind of like a symbol of here of this place."

— RM on what motivated him to perform at Dia Beacon, ARTnews

Seen in the video are Robert Irwin's landscape architecture, John Chamberlain's crushed metal sculptures, Richard Serra's Torqued Ellipses, and Dan Flavin's 1973 light sculpture untitled (to you, Heiner, with admiration and affection). RM chose to showcase the aforementioned in his performances because of his admiration for the respective artists and his fascination with the conception and creation of their works.

== Critical reception ==
Professional ratings
Aggregate scores
Source	Rating
Metacritic	87/100
Review scores
Source	Rating
AllMusic	4/5 stars
Clash	8/10
Consequence	91/100
NME	5/5 stars
The Observer	60/100
Rolling Stone	80/100

On Metacritic, which assigns a normalized rating out of 100 to reviews from professional publications, Indigo has received an average score of 87 based on six reviews, indicating "universal acclaim". Consequence's Mary Siroky wrote that Indigo "feels like a gift to [RM's] own creative spirit as much as it does a gift to the listeners" and that it "captures something about the human experience, which is that there's room for the kind of bone-deep heartache...alongside the joy." She summarized the album as "a record from a writer at the very top of his game who has proven that he still has so far to go and so much to share", with praise for the way RM expresses his frustrations about a "uniquely isolating chapter of life, the "creative catharsis" and experimentation evident on the album, and its "poignant unraveling of heartbreak and hope." Siroky pinpointed "Still Life", "All Day", and "Wild Flower" as essential tracks from the album.

Clash observed that “RM is at his kaleidoscopic best on new solo album Indigo.” Abbie Aitken highlighted the "sense of growth" and change in perspective present on Indigo in her review for Clash magazine. She described the record as "a more candid representation" of RM" that "presents a vivid accumulation of lessons learnt, artistic prowess and a mature outlook on ageing." She gave it an 8/10 rating, writing that "the inclusion of art combined with the presence of an interpretation of nature...feels calming, relatable and fresh". Aitken also commended RM's "meticulous" choice in collaborators, noting that "each track works within the featured artists confines." She concluded that the album "is a charming look into the mentality of a global superstar."

NME music writer Rhian Daly gave Indigo five stars, stating that RM “makes [an] emphatic bid for timelessness” with a “remarkable solo debut” that “incisively and imaginatively captures the uncertainties and unpredictabilities of life.” Daly observed that Indigo is “unpredictable and restless” and “exists in a constant state of metamorphosis, all the while searching for – and eventually finding some – answers.” The album “holds a mirror up to a period that’s often seen as one of exploration and finding your path” and like life, is “thrillingly in flux.” Daly praised the opening track “Yun” as a “a pensive callback to ’90s boom-bap that asks questions of identity, art and purpose” and the “rawness and roughness - and almost an emo quality” to RM's vocals in “Lonely.” Daly continued: “lyrically, the record shows one of his generation’s most incisive and imaginative writers levelling up.” Daly noted that RM “deploys every feature masterfully, each buoyed by a feeling of purpose” and concluded that “ ‘Indigo’ feels like a masterpiece with the potential to be remembered as a classic.”

Rolling Stone music writer Michelle Hyun Kim noted that “heavy is the head that wears the crown” in relation to RM, and through Indigo, he “reclaims his pen.” Kim opined that “Indigo is an adventurous sonic portrait of RM’s inner world, the work of an artist who finds his voice by bringing together the influences that resonate with his soul.” Kim praised the track “Yun” for creating a “sonic meeting ground” for “two legends to meet,” Erykah Badu and the late South Korean painter Yun Hyong-keun. Kim added: “The thrilling combination is a reminder of RM’s previous bibliography-building on BTS songs, in which he has alluded to both Haruki Murakami and Jungian philosophy—creating a universe of references that have made their music so easy to get lost in.” “Wild Flower” was called an “explosive rock track” whose “verses allude to RM’s endless anxieties” and where RM “paints the image of an open field as a place where he can reconnect with his purpose.” Kim concluded that “[RM’s] writing has become his superpower, as millions around the world have identified with his introspective, deeply felt lyrics.”

Lenika Cruz of The Atlantic stated that Indigo is a “musically omnivorous, profoundly collaborative effort that still feels like the work of an auteur—one who’s spent years refining his own sound and thematic obsessions.” Cruz framed the album as a search for meaning, saying that “despite being a pop star, RM is drawn to slower, more contemplative forms of art and engagement.” Cruz characterized lead single “Wild Flower” as “an epic that swirls like a hurricane…sincere, pleading, and full of hard-won acceptance.” Janelle Okwodu of Vogue declared that RM “delves into subjects—isolation, yearning, regret—that everyone can recognize” on tracks like “Still Life” and “Lonely”. Okwodu referred to it as a “shift toward a more intimate kind of storytelling” and challenging of genre as “an addictive blend of rock, pop, hip-hop, and funk.”

The Recording Academy stated that RM “showcases a new level of artistry” on Indigo, praising the album for its intentionality and its meshing of artistic mediums through music and art. The album's collaborations “reflect the caliber of artistry RM has reached” and “his ability to bridge the gap across borders.” Recording Academy writer Ashlee Mitchell observed that “this album is about the art of music, not breaking records or following trends.”

Uproxx writer Lai Frances called “Wild Flower” a “bone-chilling” single from RM's “highly anticipated Indigo album.” Writer Lexi Lane also praised the track “Still Life” for “blending elements of R&B with RM’s heavy-hitting rap verses.” Indigo tracks were likewise chosen as best new music picks by Nylon (“Yun” features Erykah Badu sounding “magical against the rapper’s complex ruminations”), Consequence (“Still Life” features a “dichotomy…which is about reclaiming autonomy when living a life that’s incredibly on display”), Rolling Stone, and MTV.

Music writer Divyansha Dongre called the album a "refined manifestation of the perspectives [RM has] meditated on over the past decade." Billboard ranked Indigo at the top of its year-end list of the "25 Best K-pop Albums of 2022", with journalist Jeff Benjamin writing that "RM captured the essence of his twenties in the 10 tracks on Indigo, but this 32-minute journey touches far beyond one person's experience. Like good art, Indigo speaks to ideas and messages that are complicated to put into everyday words, but just listening to the music lets it all come to the surface".

== Commercial performance ==
Indigo initially charted in Japan with digital sales only. It debuted at number one on Oricon's weekly Digital Albums Chart dated December 12, 2022, with 3,231 copies sold during the tracking period dated November 28–December 4, 2022. Following the release of the physical album in the country on December 10, it entered the weekly Albums Chart issue dated December 19, at number four, with 25,123 sales recorded for the period dated December 5–11.

The album debuted at number 15 in the United States on the Billboard 200 issue dated December 17, 2022, with 31,000 equivalent album units, marking RM's second and highest entry on the chart to date. Of this figure, 10,500 pure copies of the digital album were sold—the physical was not yet available in the country—earning RM his second top-10 entry on the corresponding issue of the Top Album Sales chart, at number 10. He re-entered the Artist 100 chart at number eight, his highest peak on the ranking at the time. Eight of the album's tracks—"Wildflower", "Still Life", "Yun", "Lonely", "All Day", "Hectic", " No.2" and "Forg_tful—simultaneously ranked on the World Digital Song Sales chart, occupying the top eight positions respectively, making RM the fourth artist since the chart's inception—after BTS, Agust D, and J-Hope—to do so. "Still Life", "Yun", and "All Day" occupied the top three of the Rap Digital Song Sales chart while "Closer" topped the R&B and R&B/Hip-Hop Digital Song Sales charts respectively.

Following the US release of the physical album on December 16, Indigo peaked at number three on the Billboard 200 chart issue dated December 31, with 83,000 equivalent album units—this included 79,000 pure sales (77,500 physical albums and an additional 1,500 digital albums) and 4,000 streaming equivalent album units (5.3 million streams)—earning RM his first solo top-10 entry and highest peak on the ranking and making him the highest-charting Korean solo artist in Billboard 200 history; he surpassed the record previously set by South Korean singer Nayeon with her debut EP Im Nayeon, which peaked at number seven in July. RM also rose to a new peak on the Artist 100 at number six.

== Accolades ==
Indigo and its tracks were featured on critics' lists from publications such as Rolling Stone India, Billboard, TIME, Consequence, and Dazed. South Korean magazine IZM ranked Indigo among the Best K-Pop Albums of 2023, with music critic Park Soo-jin noting “this initiative and boldness that runs through the length and breadth of the album is something that has not been seen in recent years.” Bandwagon Asia named Indigo in the Top Albums/EPs of 2022, and called RM “exacting in his choices, resulting in a trendless album that follows RM’s personal sensibilities.” Genius Korea ranked Indigo as number one on the Best K-Pop Albums of 2023, stating that with its “blend of different genres, a roster of eclectic artists, and masterful penmanship, RM created the poignant Indigo…a lyrical masterpiece [that] offers both reflective and ambitious perspectives, making it the best album of the year.” Paper named the track “Yun” as one the Best K-Pop B-Sides of 2022, writing that the homage to the late Korean artist Yun Hyong-keun is “a poignant reflection from one of the most influential minds in music right now.”

Billboard included the cover of Indigo as eighty-sixth on its list of the 100 Best Album Covers of All Time, stating about the cover that included artist Yun Hyong-keun's Blue (1972): “Enigmatic and elegiac, it’s a fitting visual to accompany an album about saying goodbye to a period in one’s life.”

Critics’ rankings for Indigo
Publication	Accolade	Rank	Ref
Billboard	25 Best K-pop Albums of 2022	1	
Genius Korea	Best K-Pop Albums of 2023	1	
Rolling Stone	Best of Music 2022: Staff Picks	1, 8	
Consequence	Readers Survey for Best Albums of 2022	2	
Rolling Stone India	5 Best Korean Hip-Hop and R&B Albums of 2022	3	
Genius	50 Best Albums of 2022	25	
TIME	Best K-Pop Songs and Albums of 2022	N/A	
IZM	Best Albums of the Year	N/A	
Hankook Ilbo	Albums of the Year	N/A	
Bandwagon Asia	Top Albums/EPs of 2022	N/A	

Critics’ rankings for Indigo tracks
Publication	Track	Accolade	Rank	Ref
Consequence	Wild Flower	Readers Survey for Best Songs of 2022	3	
Genius Korea	Closer	Best K-Pop Collaborations of 2023	5	
Paper	Yun	Best K-Pop B-Sides of 2022	10	
Dazed	Wild Flower	Best K-Pop Tracks of 2022	17	
Teen Vogue	Wild Flower, Still Life, Change Pt. 2	79 Best K-Pop Songs of 2022	N/A	
Bandwagon Asia	Closer	Top Collaborations of 2022	N/A	

== Track listing ==
Indigo track listing
No.	Title	Writer(s)	Producer(s)	Length
1.	"Yun" (with Erykah Badu)	RM; Logikal J; Ghstloop	Logikal J; Ghstloop	3:54
2.	"Still Life" (with Anderson .Paak)	RM; Ninos Hanna; Emil Schmidt; Adam Kulling; Ghstloop	Hanna; Schmidt; Kulling; Ghstloop	2:55
3.	"All Day" (with Tablo)	Pdogg; RM; Tablo	Pdogg	3:06
4.	"Forg_tful" (건망증; Geonmanjeung; lit. 'Forgetfulness'; with Kim Sa-wol)	RM; John Eun	Eun	2:42
5.	"Closer" (with Paul Blanco, Mahalia)	RM; Andy Clutterbuck; James Hatcher; Mahalia Burkmar; Benjamin Hart; Blanco; Pdogg	Honne	3:17
6.	"Change Pt.2"	RM; EAeon	EAeon	1:54
7.	"Lonely"	RM; Pdogg	Pdogg	2:46
8.	"Hectic" (with Colde)	Pdogg; RM; Colde	Pdogg	3:46
9.	"Wild Flower" (들꽃놀이; Deulkkonnori; lit. 'Playing with Wildflowers'; with Youjeen)	RM; Docskim	Docskim	4:33
10.	"No.2" (with Park Ji-yoon)	RM; Eun	Eun	3:14
Total length:				32:07

== Personnel ==
Credits adapted from the liner notes of Indigo and listed alphabetically. Excludes vocal, songwriting, and production credits already cited above.

Mastered by Chris Gehringer at Sterling Sound.

- JaRon "Joe Cool" Adkison – record engineering (track 1)
- Erykah Badu – background vocals (track 1)
- Antwone Barnes – choir (tracks 2, 3)
- Duane Benjamin – choir co-production (tracks 2, 3), choir arrangement/orchestration (track 2)
- Paul Blanco – background vocals (track 5), record engineering (track 5)
- Dedrick Bonner – choir arrangement/orchestration (tracks 2, 3), choir (tracks 2, 3), choir direction (tracks 2, 3)
- Bryce Charles – choir (tracks 2, 3)
- Hye-jin Choi – record engineering (track 10)
- Marqell Ward Clayton – choir (tracks 2, 3)
- Colde – record engineering (track 8)
- Docskim – piano (track 9), synthesizer (track 9), bass (track 9), programming (track 9), string arrangement (track 9)
- EAeon – keyboard (track 6), synthesizer (track 6), record engineering (track 6)
- John Eun – piano (tracks 4, 10), acoustic guitar (tracks 4, 10), bass (tracks 4, 10), percussion (tracks 4, 10), vocal and rap arrangement (tracks 4, 10), record engineering (tracks 4, 10), digital editing (tracks 4, 10), mix engineering (tracks 4, 10), electric piano (track 10), synthesizer (track 10), electric guitar (track 10), background vocals (track 10)
- Evan – digital editing (tracks 2, 3, 5–8)
- Ghstloop – keyboard (tracks 1, 2), synthesizer (tracks 1, 2), digital editing (tracks 1, 2, 6)
- Summer Greer – choir (tracks 2, 3)
- Hissnoise – digital editing (track 9)
- Honne – keyboard (track 5), synthesizer (track 5), guitars (track 5), drum programming (track 5)
- Jaycen Joshua – mix engineering (track 2)
  - Mike Seaberg – mix engineering (track 2)
    - Rachel Blum – assistant (track 2)
    - Jacob Richards – assistant (track 2)
    - DJ Riggins – assistant (track 2)
- Onewoo Kang – additional programming (track 9)
- David Kim – mix engineering (track 3)
- Jongkuk Kim – drums (track 10)
- Rob Kinelski – mix engineering (track 6)
- Adam Kulling – keyboard (track 2), synthesizer (track 2)
- Ken Lewis – mix engineering (tracks 1, 5)
- Logikal – keyboard (tracks 1, 2), synthesizer (track 1)
- Maiz – digital editing (tracks 2, 3, 5)
- Manny Marroquin – mix engineering (track 9)
  - Zach Pereyra – assistant mix engineering (track 9)
  - Trey Station – assistant mix engineering (track 9)
  - Anthony Vilchis – assistant mix engineering (track 9)
- Shin Min – string arrangement (track 9), string conducting (track 9)
- Sha'leah Nikole – choir (tracks 2, 3)
- Sung-geun Oh – record engineering (track 9)
  - Ye-chan Joo – assistant (track 9)
- Ji-yoon Park – background vocals (track 10)
- Pdogg – keyboard (tracks 3, 5, 7, 8), synthesizer (tracks 3, 7, 8), drum programming (track 5)
- Ililta Pina – choir (tracks 2, 3)
- Erik Reichers – record engineering (tracks 2, 3)
- James F. Reynolds – mix engineering (track 7)
  - CD Rios – studio assistant (tracks 2, 3)
- RM – vocal and rap arrangement (tracks 1–10), record engineering (tracks 1–10), background vocals (tracks 3, 5–10), percussion (track 4)
- Clinton Roane – choir (tracks 2, 3)
- Emily Silva – choir (tracks 2, 3)
- Slowminsteady – guitar (track 9)
- Julio Ulloa – record engineering (track 2)
- Ga Yang – mix engineering (track 8)
- Yong String – string (track 9)
- Youjeen – background vocals (track 9), vocal and rap arrangement (track 9)
- Young – guitars (track 5), record engineering (track 5)
- Zin – vocal and rap arrangement (track 9), record engineering (track 9)

== Charts ==
=== Weekly charts ===
Weekly chart performance
Chart (2022)	Peak position
Australian Albums (ARIA)	26
Austrian Albums (Ö3 Austria)	29
Belgian Albums (Ultratop Flanders)	53
Belgian Albums (Ultratop Wallonia)	8
Canadian Albums (Billboard)	19
Croatian International Albums (HDU)	9
Danish Albums (Hitlisten)	25
Dutch Albums (Album Top 100)	67
Finnish Albums (Suomen virallinen lista)	7
French Albums (SNEP)	27
German Albums (Offizielle Top 100)	18
Greek Albums (IFPI)	18
Hungarian Albums (MAHASZ)	9
Irish Albums (IRMA)	64
Italian Albums (FIMI)	21
Japanese Albums (Oricon) Book Edition	4
Japanese Combined Albums (Oricon)	4
Japanese Hot Albums (Billboard Japan)	4
Lithuanian Albums (AGATA)	3
New Zealand Albums (RMNZ)	12
Polish Albums (ZPAV)	11
Portuguese Albums (AFP)	3
South Korean Albums (Circle)	2
Spanish Albums (Promusicae) Book Edition	28
Swedish Albums (Sverigetopplistan)	55
Swiss Albums (Schweizer Hitparade)	6
UK Albums (Official Charts)	45
US Billboard 200	3
US Vinyl Albums (Billboard)	2
US World Albums (Billboard)	1

=== Monthly charts ===
Monthly chart performance
Chart (2022)	Peak position
Japanese Albums (Oricon) Book Edition	11
South Korean Albums (Circle) Book Edition	3
South Korean Albums (Circle) Weverse Album	6

=== Year-end charts ===
Year-end chart performance
Chart (2022)	Position
South Korean Albums (Circle) Book Edition	31
South Korean Albums (Circle) Weverse Album	74

Year-end chart performance
Chart (2023)	Position
Japanese Hot Albums (Billboard Japan)	93
US World Albums (Billboard)	12

== Certifications and sales ==
Sales certifications for Indigo
Region	Certification	Certified units/sales
Japan	—	33,258
South Korea (KMCA)	2× Platinum	879,620
United States	—	93,500

== Release history ==
Release dates and formats
Region	Date	Format(s)	Label	Ref.
Various	December 2, 2022	CD; digital download; streaming	Big Hit Music	
Japan	December 10, 2022	CD	Big Hit Music	
Europe	December 16, 2022	CD	Big Hit; UMG	
Italy	December 16, 2022	CD	Big Hit; UMG	
United States	December 16, 2022	CD	Big Hit; UMG	
