= Still Life (RM song) =

Song by RM featuring Anderson .Paak

from the album Indigo
- Language: Korean
- Released: December 6, 2022
- Length: 2:55
- Label: Big Hit
- Songwriters: RM; Ninos Hanna; Emil Schmidt; Adam Kulling; Ghstloop
- Producers: Hanna; Schmidt; Kulling; Ghstloop

Music video
- "Still Life" on YouTube

"Still Life" is a song by South Korean rapper RM of BTS featuring American rapper Anderson .Paak. It was released on December 2, 2022 as the second track from his debut studio album Indigo (2022). A music video for the song was released on December 6.

== Charts ==
Weekly chart performance for "Still Life"
Chart (2022)	Peak position
Global 200 (Billboard)	187
South Korea (Circle)	157
New Zealand Hot Singles (RMNZ)	29
Vietnam Hot 100 (Billboard)	37
