= Lack of Afro =

English musician

- Born: Adam Gibbons; 24 March 1981 (age 45); Exeter, Devon, England
- Genres: R&B; soul
- Occupations: Musician, music producer
- Instruments: Piano, alto saxophone
- Years active: 2006–present
- Labels: LOA Records, Freestyle Records

Adam Gibbons (born 24 March 1981) (performing as Lack of Afro) is an English musician, multi-instrumentalist and producer from Exeter, England.

== Career ==
Born into a musical family as the son of Teresa and Hugh Gibbons, he was educated at Exeter Cathedral School and Kelly College. He started playing the piano at the age of seven, taking lessons from his grandmother, Kay Gibbons. He took up the alto saxophone at the age of eleven and had progressed to Grade 8 by the time he was 17. He gained the nickname 'Lack of Afro' while a student at university where, as a disc jockey, he played funk at gigs. In his review of Gibbons's 2011 album This Time, Lloyd Bradley wrote of Gibbons that "as a fairly nerdy looking white guy, there was never going to be an afro involved in his vintage funk stylings."

Gibbons started his professional career when he was signed with Freestyle Records in 2006, who subsequently released his debut single, "Wait A Minute".

Since joining Freestyle, he has released numerous albums including Press On, My Time, and, perhaps his most popular, Music For Adverts. Jack of All Trades was released on 24 May 2018.

== Discography ==
- Press On (2007)
- My Groove Your Move (2009)
- This Time (2011)
- Music For Adverts (2014)
- Hello Baby (2016)
- Jack of All Trades (2018)
- I’m Here Now (2020)
- Square One (2023)
- From the Volt, One (2024)
- From the Volt, Two (2025)
- Love Dealer (2025)
- Music For Motion Pictures (2026)
