= Talib Kweli discography =

This is the discography of Talib Kweli, an American rapper.

== Albums ==
=== Solo albums ===
List of studio albums, with selected chart positions and certifications
Title	Album details	Peak chart positions								Certifications
Title	Album details	US	US Indie	US R&B	CAN	FRA	JPN	SWI	UK	Certifications
Quality	Released: November 19, 2002; Label: Rawkus; Format: CD, LP, digital download	21	—	6	—	120	—	—	—	RIAA: Gold
The Beautiful Struggle	Released: September 28, 2004; Label: Rawkus; Format: CD, LP, digital download	14	—	3	39	130	—	75	124	
Eardrum	Released: August 21, 2007; Label: Blacksmith, Warner Bros.; Format: CD, LP, digital download	2	—	2	23	—	—	34	82	
Gutter Rainbows	Released: January 25, 2011; Label: Javotti Media, 3D; Format: CD, LP, digital download	29	4	7	—	—	289	86	—	
Prisoner of Conscious	Released: May 7, 2013; Label: Javotti Media; Format: CD, LP, digital download	48	9	7	—	—	—	—	—	
Gravitas	Released: December 15, 2013; Label: Javotti Media; Format: CD, LP, digital download	114	22	25	—	—	—	—	—	
Fuck the Money	Released: August 14, 2015; Label: Javotti Media; Format: CD, LP, digital download	—	—	—	—	—	—	—	—	
Radio Silence	Released: November 17, 2017; Label: Javotti Media / 3D; Format: CD, LP, digital download	—	26	—	—	—	—	—	—	

=== Collaborative albums ===
List of collaborative albums, with selected chart positions
Title	Album details	Peak chart positions			
Title	Album details	US	US R&B	CAN	UK
Mos Def & Talib Kweli Are Black Star (with Mos Def as Black Star)	Released: September 29, 1998; Label: Rawkus; Format: CD, LP, cassette, digital download	53	13	—	—
Train of Thought (with Hi-Tek as Reflection Eternal)	Released: October 17, 2000; Label: Rawkus; Format: CD, LP, cassette, digital download	17	5	—	137
Liberation (with Madlib)	Released: March 20, 2007; Label: Blacksmith; Format: CD, LP, digital download	—	—	—	—
Revolutions per Minute (with Hi-Tek as Reflection Eternal)	Released: May 18, 2010; Label: Blacksmith, Warner Bros.; Format: CD, LP, digital download	18	5	61	—
Habits of the Heart (with Res as Idle Warship)	Released: November 1, 2011; Label: Blacksmith, Element 9; Format: CD, LP, digital download	—	—	—	—
Indie 500 (with 9th Wonder)	Released: November 6, 2015; Label: Javotti Media, Jamla; Format: CD, LP, digital download	—	—	—	—
The Seven (with Styles P)	Released: April 14, 2017; Label: Javotti Media, 3D; Format: Digital download	195	—	—	—
Gotham (with Diamond D)	Released: April 16, 2021; Label: Javotti Media; Format: Digital download	—	—	—	—
No Fear of Time (with Yasiin Bey as Black Star)	Released: May 3, 2022; Label: Luminary; Format: streaming	—	—	—	—
Liberation 2 (with Madlib)	Released: March 6, 2023; Label: Luminary; Format: streaming	—	—	—	—
The Confidence of Knowing (with J. Rawls)	Released: September 13, 2024; Label: Javotti Media, Fat Beats; Format: Digital download	—	—	—	—

=== Mixtapes ===
- 2004: The Beautiful Mix CD
- 2005: The Beautiful Mixtape Vol. 2: The Struggle Continues
- 2005: Right About Now: The Official Sucka Free Mix CD - Charted #113 on the Billboard 200 and #24 on US R&B/Hip-Hop Albums.
- 2006: Brooklyn, Tennessee
- 2006: Kweli: Confidential
- 2006: Blacksmith: The Movement
- 2007: Clinton Sparks & Talib Kweli: Get Familiar
- 2007: Focus
- 2008: The MCEO Mixtape
- 2009: Party Robot (with Idle Warship)
- 2009: The Re:Union (with Reflection Eternal) (mixed by Statik Selektah)
- 2010: Early Mourning Signs
- 2011: We Run This Vol. 7 (with Mr. E)
- 2012: Attack the Block
- 2014: Javotti Media Presents: The Cathedral
- 2015: Train of Thought: Lost Lyrics, Rare Releases & Beautiful B-Sides Vol.1
- 2016: Awful People Are Great at Parties

== Singles ==
=== Solo singles ===
Year	Song title	Chart positions				Album
Year	Song title	U.S.	U.S. R&B	U.S. Rap	UK	Album
2002	"Good to You"	–	95	–	–	Quality
2002	"Waitin' for the DJ" (feat. Bilal)	–	77	–	–	Quality
2003	"Get By"	77	29	16	–	Quality
2004	"I Try" (feat. Mary J. Blige)	–	77	–	59	The Beautiful Struggle
2004	"Around My Way" (feat. John Legend)	–	–	–	–	The Beautiful Struggle
2005	"Never Been in Love" (feat. Just Blaze)	–	–	–	–	The Beautiful Struggle
2005	"Peace of Mind"	–	–	–	–	N<>A
2005	"Flash Gordon"	–	–	–	170	Right About Now: The Official Sucka Free Mix CD
2006	"Fly That Knot" (feat. MF Doom)	–	–	–	–	Right About Now: The Official Sucka Free Mix CD
2006	"Listen!!!"	–	–	–	–	Eardrum/ Freedom Writers (soundtrack)
2007	"Hush" (featuring Jean Grae)	–	–	–	–	Eardrum
2007	"Hot Thing" (featuring will.i.am)	–	102	–	–	Eardrum
2007	"Hostile Gospel (Part 1) (Deliver Us)"	–	–	–	–	Eardrum
2010	"Cold Rain"	–	–	–	–	Gutter Rainbows
2012	"Push Thru"(featuring Currensy & Kendrick Lamar)	–	–	–	–	Prisoner of Conscious
2012	"Human Mic"	–	–	–	–	Prisoner of Conscious
2012	"Come Here"(featuring Miguel)	–	–	–	–	Prisoner of Conscious
2012	"High Life"(featuring Rubix & Bajah)	–	–	–	–	Prisoner of Conscious
2012	"Upper Echelon"	–	–	–	–	Prisoner of Conscious
2012	"Favela Love"(featuring Seu Jorge)	–	–	–	–	Prisoner of Conscious
2013	"State of Grace" featuring Abby Dobson	–	–	–	–	Gravitas
2013	"Rare Portraits"	–	–	–	–	Gravitas
2013	"The Wormhole"	–	–	–	–	Gravitas
2013	"What's Real" (featuring Res)	–	–	–	–	Gravitas
2013	"Violations" (featuring Raekwon)	–	–	–	–	Gravitas

=== Collaborative singles ===
Year	Song title	Collaboration partner	Group/artist name	Chart positions				Collaborative project
Year	Song title	Collaboration partner	Group/artist name	U.S.	U.S. R&B	U.S. Rap	CAN	Collaborative project
1998	"Definition"	Mos Def	Black Star	60	31	3	–	Mos Def & Talib Kweli are Black Star
1999	"Respiration" (feat. Common)	Mos Def	Black Star	–	–	54	6	Mos Def & Talib Kweli are Black Star
2000	"One Four Love Pt. 1'"	Mos Def, Kool G Rap, Rah Digga, Sporty Thievz, Shabaam Sahdeeq, Common, Pharoahe Monch & Posdnuos	N/A	55	4	6	–	Hip Hop for Respect EP
2000	"Move Somethin'"	Hi-Tek	Reflection Eternal	–	32	1	–	Train of Thought
2001	"The Blast" (feat. Vinia Mojica)	Hi-Tek	Reflection Eternal	–	48	2	–	Train of Thought
2009	"Back Again" (feat. Res)	Hi-Tek	Reflection Eternal	–	–	–	–	Revolutions per Minute
2010	"Just Begun" (feat. Jay Electronica, J. Cole and Mos Def)	Hi-Tek	Reflection Eternal	–	–	–	–	Revolutions per Minute
2010	"In This World"	Hi-Tek	Reflection Eternal	–	–	–	–	Revolutions per Minute
2010	"Strangers (Paranoid)" (feat. Bun B)	Hi-Tek	Reflection Eternal	–	–	–	–	Revolutions per Minute
2010	"Midnight Hour" (feat. Estelle)	Hi-Tek	Reflection Eternal	–	–	–	–	Revolutions per Minute
2011	"Driving Me Insane"	Res	Idle Warship	–	–	–	–	Habits of the Heart
2011	"Beautifully Bad"	Res	Idle Warship	–	–	–	–	Habits of the Heart
2011	"Beautiful"	Big K.R.I.T., Mela Machinko, Outasight	N/A					Non-album single
2019	"Legacy"	Mike Posner	–	–	–	–	–	Keep Going

=== Soundtracks ===
- 2011: Beat the World

=== Promotional singles ===
List of singles, showing year released and album name
Title	Year	Album
"Stand Up (The Sean Bell Tribute Song)" (with Swizz Beatz, Maino, Cassidy, Styles P and Drag-On)	2008	Non-album single

== Guest appearances ==
{excludes appearances as Black Star or Reflection Eternal}

List of guest appearances
Title	Year	Other performer(s)	Album
"What If?"	1997	L-Fudge, Mike Zoot, Shabaam Sahdeeq, Skam	Soundbombing
"Outside the Lounge"	1998	Shabaam Sahdeeq, WiseGuy, Word A' Mouth, Lil' Sci	Lyricist Lounge, Volume One
"Fruits of Labor in the Sunshine"	1998	Wizdom Life	—N/a
"Day by Day"	1998	Tommy Tee, Punch & Words, A.L.	Bonds, Beats and Beliefs
"The Truth"	1999	Pharoahe Monch, Common	Internal Affairs
"Protective Custody"	2000	Breeze Brewin, Donte (of Mood), El-P, Jah-Born, John Forté, Main Flow, Mr. Khaliyl, Mr. Len, Nine, Punchline, Tiye Phoenix & Jean Grae	Hip Hop 4 Respect
"Make Things Better"	2000	DJ Hurricane, N'Dea Davenport	Don't Sleep
"Y'all Stay Up"	2000	Youngblood Brass Band	Unlearn
"Broken Anglish"	2001	Crunch E.X.	Broken English
"Oz Theme 2000"	2001	Kool G Rap, Lord Jamar	Oz (soundtrack)
"Due Process"	2001	Lone Catalysts, Rubix	Hip Hop
"The Life (Remix)"	2001	Mystic, Kam	12"
"Communicate"	2001	Ge-ology, Sadat X	—N/a
"The Anti-Love Movement"	2001	Da Beatminerz, Total	Brace 4 Impak
"Live on Stage" (Remix)	2001	Dilated Peoples	—N/a
"It's Going Down (B!nk Remix)"	2002	Blackalicious, Lateef the Truthspeaker	12"
Shuffering + Shmiling	2002	dead prez, Jorge Ben Jor, Talib Kweli, Bilal & Positive Force (Nigeria)	Red Hot + Riot: The Music and Spirit of Fela Kuti
"Hot Night"	2002	Meshell Ndegeocello	Cookie: The Anthropological Mixtape
"Tha Proem"	2002	DJ Quik, Shyheim, Hi-C	Under tha Influence
"Rolling with Heat"	2002	The Roots	Phrenology
"Rhymes and Ammo"	2002	The Roots	Soundbombing III /Phrenology
"Opposite Day"	2002	Pumpkinghead	The Time Chronicles
"Mood Swings"	2003	Asheru	Wordsworth 7 Heads R Better Than 1: No Edge-Ups in South Africa, Volume 1
"Coming from the Lower Level"	2003	CHOPS, Ras Kass, Phil da Agony	Virtuosity
"Raw Shit"	2003	Jaylib	Champion Sound
"Hip Hop Worth Dying For"	2004	Main Flow	Hip Hopulation
"Get 'em High"	2004	Kanye West, Common	The College Dropout
"Freedom"	2004	Estelle, John Legend	The 18th Day
"Fly Til I Die"	2004	Pete Rock, CL Smooth	Soul Survivor II
"For the City"	2004	Phil da Agony	The Aromatic Album
"Chillin'"	2004	Erick Sermon, Whip Montez	Chilltown, New York
"Wack Niggaz"	2004	Consequence, Kanye West, Common	Take 'Em To The Cleaners
"Yellin' Away"	2004	Zap Mama, Common, Questlove	Ancestry in Progress
"We Came Up (Crystal Stair)"	2005	Smif-N-Wessun	Tek & Steele: Reloaded
"Let It Breathe"	2005	Hush	Bulletproof
"Like That"	2005	The Black Eyed Peas, Q-Tip, CeeLo Green, John Legend	Monkey Business
"Old School"	2005	Danger Doom	The Mouse and the Mask
"Temperature"	2005	Zion I	True & Livin'
"Power, Money and Influence"	2005	Guru, Jean Grae	Version 7.0: The Street Scriptures
"She"	2005	Brian McKnight	Gemini
"Ridin'"	2005	David Banner, Dead Prez	Certified
"Testify"	2006	Styles P	Time Is Money
"Kindness for Weakness"	2006	Dilated Peoples	20/20
"My Favorite Mutiny"	2006	The Coup, Black Thoughts	Pick a Bigger Weapon
"Gettin Up Anthem"	2006	Rakim	Getting Up: Contents Under Pressure (soundtrack)
"If"	2006	Kenn Starr	Starr Status
"Certified Samurai"	2007	RZA, Lil Free, Suga Bang	Afro Samurai: The Album
"Project Jazz"	2007	Hell Razah, Viktor Vaughn	Renaissance Child
"One Step"	2007	Strong Arm Steady	Deep Hearted
"Streetlights"	2007	Strong Arm Steady	Deep Hearted
"Feel the Bass"	2007	Sa-Ra Creative Partners	The Hollywood Recordings
"Lightworking"	2007	J Dilla, Q-TIp	B-Ball Zombie War
"Bushonomics"	2007	Cornel West	Never Forget: A Journey of Revelations
"Real Women"	2007	UGK, Raheem DeVaughn	Underground Kingz
"Be Alright"	2007	Scribe	Rhyme Book
"Express Yourself '08"	2007	Statik Selektah, Termanology, Consequence	Spell My Name Right: The Album
"Hold It Down"	2008	Buckshot & 9th Wonder	The Formula
"Put Ya Stamp On It"	2008	Akrobatik	Absolute Value
"So Far So Good"	2008	Skillz	The Million Dollar Backpack
"I Can't Help It"	2008	The Roots	Rising Down
"I Am"	2008	Novel, Spree Wilson	N.A.
"Lock Shit Down"	2009	Chali 2na	Fish Outta Water
"Math"	2009	Chico DeBarge	Addiction
Anguish Love and Romance	2009	The New Congress	Anguish Love and Romance
"Therapy"	2009	The Alchemist, Kid Cudi, Blu, Evidence	Chemical Warfare
"Oh Really"	2009	KRS-One, Buckshot	Survival Skills
"Crossfire"	2009	Swollen Members	Armed to the Teeth
"Get Started"	2010	Strong Arm Steady	In Search of Stoney Jackson
"Alright"	2010	Stat Quo	Statlanta
"Let Freedom Reign"	2010	Chrisette Michele, Black Thought	Let Freedom Reign
"Ironside"	2010	Quincy Jones	Q Soul Bossa Nostra
"Go"	2010	Nelly, Ali	5.0
"Chain Heavy"	2010	Kanye West, Consequence	GOOD Fridays
"Bumpy Ride Gmix"	2010	Mohombi	N.A.
"Test of Time"	2011	Animal Farm	Culture Shock
"Set It Off"	2011	The Away Team, Rapsody	Scars & Stripes
"Classic"	2011	MED	Bang Ya Head II
"Stay the Course"	2011	DJ Shadow, Posdnuos	The Less You Know, the Better
"Family First"	2011	Mac Miller	I Love Life, Thank You
"You're Gone"	2011	Statik Selektah, Colin Munroe, Lil Fame	Population Control
"Finally Free"	2012	DeStorm Power	Be Careful
"Spike Lee Was My Hero"	2012	Skyzoo	A Dream Deferred
"Fly Away"	2012	Peter Andre	Angels & Demons
"Get Your Way"	2012	Idle Warship, Res	The Man with the Iron Fists (soundtrack)
"Learn Truth"	2013	R.A. the Rugged Man	Legends Never Die
"Home"	2013	Statik Selektah	Extended Play
"Rise Up"	2013	Jon Connor	Unconscious State
"Sophisticated Lady Remix"	2013	John Michael Montgomery	N.A.
"Around the Block"	2013	Pretty Lights	A Color Map of the Sun
"Celebrate"	2013	Mack Maine, LIl Wayne	N.A.
"Flowers"	2013	Illa J, Frank Nitt, Niko Gray, Rhettmatic	Sunset Blvd.
"G.U.R.U."	2013	Marco Polo, DJ Premier	PA2: The Director's Cut
"Hickory"	2014	Kool A.D., Boots Riley	Word O.K.
"No Competition"	2014	9th Wonder, Elzhi, Phonte	Jamla Is the Squad
"D.R.E.A.M."	2014	Pharoahe Monch	PTSD
"Where's the Love"	2014	Diamond D, Elzhi, Skyzoo	The Diam Piece
"The Thrill Is Back"	2014	Statik Selektah, Styles P	What Goes Around
"Dopamine"	2014	Chris Webby, Grafh, B-Real, Trae tha Truth	Chemically Imbalanced
"Paradise"	2015	DJ EFN, Redman, Wreckonize	Another Time
"Thunderman"	2015	Brady Watt, Niko Is	Lifetronics
"Scratch Off"	2015	Statik Selektah, CJ Fly, Cane	Lucky 7
"The Second Line"	2015	David Lyttle	Faces
"Dream Defenders"	2015	Thirstin Howl III, Brother J	Survival of the Skillest
"For the Love"	2015	GRiZ	Say It Loud
"The Dreamer"	2016	Anderson .Paak, Timan Family Parker	Malibu
"Greatness"	2016	Karma Fields	New Age | Dark Age
"Every Ghetto (Part.2)"	2016	Problem, Aloe Blacc	AWFUL PEOPLE ARE GREAT AT PARTIES
"Touch"	2016	Shura	None
"Crossfire Pt. II"	2016	Stephen, KillaGraham	Crossfire Pt. II
"The Killing Season"	2016	A Tribe Called Quest, Consequence, Kanye West	We Got It from Here... Thank You 4 Your Service
"Stand Up"	2017	Maurice Brown	The Mood
"Us"	2017	K'Valentine	Here for a Reason
"Ammo"	2017	Grammatik, Balkan Bump	RE:Coil
"Is This Your Dream or Mine?"	2017	The Lulls in Traffic	Rabbit in the Snare
"Thinking Bout You (KAYTRANADA Remix)"	2018	Robert Glasper Experiment	—N/a
"De La Kufi"	2019	Brother Ali	Secrets & Escapes
"Snipers"	2019	Saud, Royce da 5'9", NARCY	Follow Me Home
"Time Flies"	2019	Bun B, Statik Selektah, Big K.R.I.T.	TrillStatik
"The Zone Out"	2019	Diamond D, Terror Van Pooh, NIKO IS	The Diam Piece 2
"Business or Art"	2019	Gang Starr	One of the Best Yet
"I Like Bees"	2019	Cody, Heart, Primm & Scatter	Helpsters: Apple O.S.T. Season 1
"Remove 45"	2020	De La Soul, Mysonne, Chuck D, Styles P, Pharoahe Monch	Non-album single
"From a Distance"	2020	Markis Precise	No Wings Without Scars
"No Caliphates"	2020	Sons of Yusef	Shaykh the World
"Maybe I'm in Love with You"	2022	Winston Surfshirt	Panna Cotta
"The Next Phase"	2023	Inspired Flight	Like the Stars, but Even More
"Didn't You"	2023	Count Bassie, Lettuce	Late Night Bessie
"Without You"	2023	Brady Watt, Conway the Machine	-
"Reset Button"	2023	XV	—N/a
"Infinite Love (Remix)"	2023	Frank Fitzpatrick, Sway, Loud	Soul Vision
"Tu Sae"	2024	Ana Tijoux, Plug One	Vida
"Right Now"	2024	Grafh & .38 Spesh	God's Timing
"Higher"	2024	Wax & Eric Krasno	Light Years
"Thelonius"	2024	Ingmar Thomas' Revive Big Band	Like a Tree It Grows
"Notes from the Underground"	2025	Javotti Media	Underground
"Go Brooklyn"	2025	Javotti Media	Underground
"Native Sons Part II"	2025	Javotti Media	Underground
"letthe..."	2025	Javotti Media	Underground
"SWAT (J Rawls Ridin Remix)"	2025	Javotti Media	Underground
"Below the Clouds (Remix)"	2025	Masta Ace & Marco Polo	Richmond Hill (Deluxe)
"Be About Some Bread"	2025	Bun B, Cory Mo	Way Mo Trill
"Around Here"	2025	Oh No, Rah Digga	Nodega

== See also ==
- Black Star discography
- Reflection Eternal
