= Idle Warship =

American hip hop group

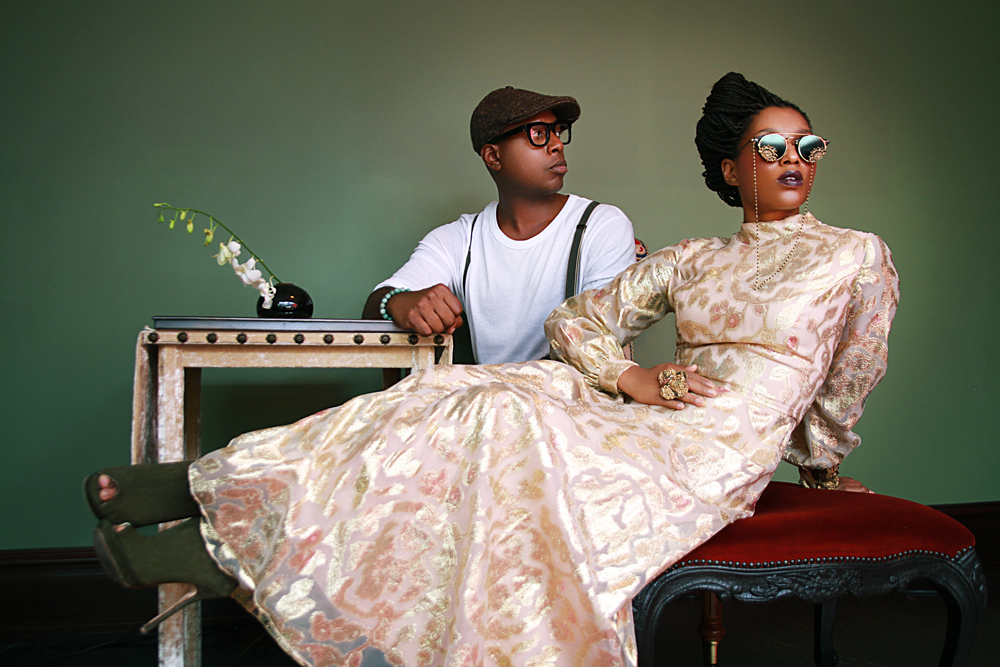

Background information
- Genres: Indie pop, hip hop, alternative hip hop
- Years active: 2004–2018
- Labels: Blacksmith Records/Element 9
- Past members: Talib Kweli; Res; Graph Nobel
- Website: www.idlewarship.com

Idle Warship was a musical duo composed of Brooklyn emcee Talib Kweli and Philadelphia singer Res. Res has appeared on each Talib Kweli album since 2000's Train of Thought. They have also toured together, including on the summer 2005 MGD Flavor 2 Savor mini-tour. They released their debut mixtape, Party Robot, on October 27, 2009 for free. This was originally set for a 2008 release and announced on Talib Kweli's MySpace page in a New Year's blog entry.

Idle Warship has released songs via their MySpace page, including "Industry Diary", "Screamin'" featuring mc chris, "Pull It Out" featuring Dapa Flex, "Fall Back" featuring Chester French, among others.

The group released their debut album Habits of the Heart on November 1, 2011.

After Res accused Talib Kweli of sexual misconduct, their dispute signaled the end of Idle Warship in 2018.

== Albums ==
- 2011: Habits of the Heart

== Mixtape ==
- 2009: Party Robot

== Singles ==
- 2008: "Screamin'" (featuring mc chris)
- 2008: "Black Snake Moan"
- 2008: "Get Up and Dance"
- 2008: "Steady"
- 2008: "Say You Will"
- 2008: "Try It On howwedoitoverhere"
- 2008: "Fall Back" (featuring Chester French)
- 2011: "Laser Beams"

== Collaborations ==
- 2000: "Too Late" (from Reflection Eternal's Train of Thought)
- 2002: "Where Do We Go" (from Talib Kweli's Quality)
- 2004: "Going Hard" (from Talib Kweli's The Beautiful Struggle)
- 2004: "We Got the Beat" (from Talib Kweli's The Beautiful Struggle)
- 2005: "7:30" (from Talib Kweli's Right About Now (Bonus Edition) and 2004's The Beautiful Mix CD)
- 2007: "Soul Music" (from Talib Kweli and Madlib's Liberation)
- 2007: "Everything Man" (from Talib Kweli's Eardrum)
- 2008: "TRY IT ON (HOWWEDOITOVERHERE)"
- 2009: "Back Again" (from Reflection Eternal's Revolutions per Minute)
- 2012: "Get Your Way (Sex as a Weapon)" (from The Man with the Iron Fists OST)
