= Stu Pflaum =

Stuart Pflaum, better known as DJ Xplosive is an American music industry figure and digital music pioneer. Pflaum was born on June 29, 1981, in Nashville, Tennessee, (age 35). Based in New York City, Pflaum previously worked as consultant to street teams and lifestyle promotions at Asylum Records and Warner Music Group.

Pflaum founded the Element 9 company in 2005 to assist in the development of independent musicians.

In 2007, Pflaum began working with teen hip-hop sensation, Soulja Boy Tell'em as his music publisher and head of online promotions.

Pflaum published The Hip-Hop Stimulus Plan in February 2009, a series of writings that explore the role of the internet in the modern music industry.

In November 2009, the Element 9 company partnered with Fontana Distribution, the independent distribution arm of Universal Music Group, to release albums from artists signed to the company's record label. Pflaum will serve as Vice President for the label.

In 2010, Element 9 announced a deal with Blacksmith Records to release a series of albums with the label headed by Talib Kweli. Their first release is scheduled to be the album Arms & Hammers by West Coast hip hop trio Strong Arm Steady and released in February 2011.
