= Right About Now: The Official Sucka Free Mix CD =

Mixtape / Studio album by Talib Kweli
- Released: November 22, 2005 (U.S.)
- Recorded: 2005
- Genres: Underground hip-hop; alternative hip-hop
- Label: Koch
- Producers: 88-Keys; Charlemagne; DJ Khalil; DJ Quick; J Dilla; J. Cardim; Kanye West; Karriem Riggins; Keezo Kane; Midi Mafia; Needlz; Raids Beats; Steven Kang; Supa Dave West; the Fyre Dept.

Talib Kweli chronology
The Beautiful Struggle (2004)	Right About Now: The Official Sucka Free Mix CD (2005)	Liberation (2006)

Professional ratings
Aggregate scores
Source	Rating
Metacritic	(68/100)
Review scores
Source	Rating
AllMusic	3/5 stars
The A.V. Club	B−
Entertainment Weekly	C+
HipHopDX	3/5 stars
Los Angeles Times	3/4 stars
Pitchfork	(5.5/10)
PopMatters	6/10 stars
RapReviews	(9/10)
Rolling Stone	3/5 stars
Spin	(6/10)
Stylus Magazine	B−

Right About Now: The Official Sucka Free Mix CD or simply Right About Now was released by Talib Kweli in November 2005 and is generally considered a mixtape. However, some people regard this release as an official album because of its availability through commercial sites and its release of two singles. It also lacks the DJ overlays often accompanied by mixtapes which makes the CD read more like an official album. This CD is notable because, although a low-key release, it features upcoming members of Kweli's record label, Blacksmith Records. The album sold 16,000 copies in its first week of release, debuting at #113 on the Billboard 200.

The appearance of Mos Def on the track Supreme Supreme is another key point of the album as Talib Kweli and Mos Def had not rapped together on a track since Kweli's Quality album in 2002. There was some controversy regarding the song "Ms. Hill", (a dedication song to artist Lauryn Hill) which features an uncredited and illegal sample of a Ben Kweller song.

== Track listing ==
#	Title	Producer(s)	Performer(s)
1	"Right About Now"	88-Keys; Raids Beats	Talib Kweli; Dave Chappelle
2	"Drugs, Basketball & Rap"	Needlz	Phil Da Agony; Planet Asia; Talib Kweli
3	"Who Got It"	Karriem Riggins	Krista Thrill; Talib Kweli
4	"Fly That Knot"	The Fyre Dept.	MF Doom; Talib Kweli
5	"Ms. Hill"	Charlemagne; Steven Kang	Talib Kweli; Ben Kweller (uncredited sample)
6	"Flash Gordon"	Supa Dave West	Talib Kweli
7	"Supreme Supreme"	Charlemagne	Black Star
8	"The Beast"	Keezo Kane	Papoose; Talib Kweli
9	"Roll Off Me"	J Dilla	Talib Kweli
10	"Rock On"	Midi Mafia	Talib Kweli
11	"Where You Gonna Run"	J. Cardim	Jean Grae; Talib Kweli
12	"Two & Two"	DJ Khalil	Talib Kweli
13	"Murderous (Bonus CD)"		Talib Kweli; Kardinal Offishall
14	"So Good (Bonus CD)"	Kanye West	Talib Kweli; Musiq; Wordsworth
15	"Tryin' To Breathe (Bonus CD)"	Midi Mafia	Talib Kweli; Killer Mike
16	"7:30 (Bonus CD)"	DJ Quik	Talib Kweli; Res

== Album singles ==
Single information
"Flash Gordon"
- Released: October 19, 2004
- B-side:
"Fly That Knot" (featuring MF Doom)
- Released: February 24, 2006
- B-side: "Who Got It"
