= Arms & Hammers =

Studio album by Strong Arm Steady
- Released: February 22, 2011
- Recorded: 2010
- Genre: Hip hop
- Length: 50:15
- Label: Blacksmith; Element 9
- Producer: Blaqthoven; DJ Khalil; Jelly Roll; Madlib; Mars; Nottz; Terrace Martin

Strong Arm Steady chronology
In Search of Stoney Jackson (2010)	Arms & Hammers (2011)	Stereo Type (2012)

Singles from Arms & Hammers
- 1. "Can't Let It Go" Released: October 21, 2008; 2. "On Point" Released: November 9, 2010; 3. "Make Me Feel" Released: December 14, 2010; 4. "Trunk Music" Released: January 11, 2011

Professional ratings
Review scores
Source	Rating
AllMusic	3.5/5 stars
HipHopDX	3.5/5

Arms & Hammers is the third studio album by the American hip hop group Strong Arm Steady. It was released on February 22, 2011, via Blacksmith Records/Element 9. Production was handled by DJ Khalil, Blaqthoven, Jelly Roll, Terrace Martin, Madlib, Mars and Nottz. It features guest appearances from Blaqthoven, Chace Infinite, Jelly Roll, Kobe, KRS-One, Kurupt, Marsha Ambrosius, Planet Asia, Talib Kweli, The Game and Too $hort. This album is dedicated to the memory of Jermaine "Janky" Salmond & Bill "Bigga B" Operian.

== Track listing ==
No.	Title	Writer(s)	Producer(s)	Length
1.	"Had Enough" (featuring JellyRoll)	Marvin Jones; Jason Smith; Charles Mitchell; Anthony Ransom	Blaqthoven	4:33
2.	"Make Me Feel" (featuring JellyRoll)	Jones; Smith; Mitchell; David Drew	JellyRoll	4:19
3.	"Klack or Get Klacked"	Jones; Smith; Mitchell; Khalil Abdul-Rahman	DJ Khalil	4:50
4.	"Gangsta's" (featuring Kobe)	Jones; Smith; Mitchell; Brian Honeycutt; Rahman	DJ Khalil	5:11
5.	"Can’t Let It Go" (featuring Blaqthoven)	Jones; Smith; Mitchell; Ransom	Blaqthoven	4:12
6.	"All the Brothers" (featuring Chace Infinite, Talib Kweli, KRS-One and Planet Asia)	Jones; Smith; Aaron Johnson; Talib Kweli Greene; Lawrence Parker; Jason Green; Dominick Lamb	Nottz	3:42
7.	"Blow My Horn" (featuring Kurupt)	Jones; Smith; Ricardo Brown; Terrace Martin	Terrace Martin	4:26
8.	"Trunk Music" (featuring The Game)	Jones; Mitchell; Jayceon Taylor; Lamar Edwards	Mars	3:59
9.	"Much More"	Jones; Smith; Mitchell; Drew	Jelly Roll	4:46
10.	"On Point" (featuring Too $hort)	Jones; Mitchell; Todd Shaw; Martin	Terrace Martin	2:57
11.	"Cheeba Cheeba Pt. 2"	Jones; Smith; Otis Jackson, Jr.	Madlib	2:37
12.	"When Darkness Falls" (featuring Marsha Ambrosius)	Jones; Smith; Mitchell; Marsha Ambrosius; Rahman	DJ Khalil	4:41
Total length:				50:15

iTunes bonus track
No.	Title	Producer(s)	Length
13.	"Bust Yo Shit" (featuring Jean Grae and David Banner)	David Banner	4:36
14.	"Smoking & Drinking"	J. Wells	4:56

== Personnel ==
- Marvin "Krondon" Jones – vocals, recording, co-executive producer
- Jason "Phil Da Agony" Smith – vocals (tracks: 1–7, 9, 11, 12)
- Charles "Mitchy Slick" Mitchell – vocals (tracks: 1–5, 8–10, 12)
- David "JellyRoll" Drew – vocals (tracks: 1, 2), producer (tracks: 2, 9)
- Brian "Kobe" Honeycutt – vocals (track 4)
- Anthony "Blaqthoven" Ransom – vocals (track 5), producer (tracks: 1, 5)
- Aaron "Chace Infinite" Johnson – vocals (track 6)
- Lawrence "KRS-One" Parker – vocals (track 6)
- Jason "Planet Asia" Green – vocals (track 6)
- Talib Kweli – vocals (track 6), executive producer, A&R
- Ricardo "Kurupt" Brown – vocals (track 7)
- Jayceon "The Game" Taylor – vocals (track 8)
- Todd "Too $hort" Shaw – vocals (track 10)
- Marsha Ambrosius – vocals (track 12)
- DJ Khalil Abdul-Rahman – producer (tracks: 3, 4, 12), mixing (tracks: 3, 12)
- Dominick "Nottz" Lamb – producer (track 6)
- Terrace Martin – producer (tracks: 7, 10)
- Lamar "Mars" Edwards – producer (track 8)
- Otis "Madlib" Jackson Jr. – producer (track 11)
- Frederico Lopez – recording
- Jason Schweitzer – mixing (tracks: 1, 3, 4, 6, 7, 10–12)
- Steve Baughman – mixing (tracks: 2, 5, 8, 9)
- Chris Bellman – mastering
- Corey Smyth – executive producer
- Christopher Lee Lyons – design
- Munk One – cover
- Jceal Parker – photography
- Brandon Torres – A&R, product management
- Midori Nishijima-Kim – A&R

== Charts ==
Chart (2011)	Peak position
US Heatseekers Albums (Billboard)	46
