= Element 9 (music) =

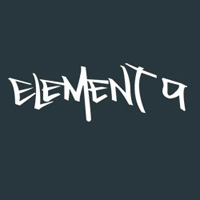
- Parent company: Fontana
- Founded: 2005
- Founder: Stu Pflaum
- Distributor: Fontana (US)
- Genre: Hip hop, R&B
- Country of origin: US
- Official website: http://www.element9muzik.com/

Element 9 is a music company founded by Stu Pflaum in 2005. The company is based in Cleveland, Ohio and has three divisions with specializations in music publishing, digital marketing and a record label.

== Company history ==
The Element 9 music company was launched in 2005 as a promotional outlet for aspiring hip hop artists. The company was founded by Stu Pflaum while he was a senior at Ohio University. Pflaum formerly performed as a DJ on college radio before launching the company. Upon graduation from Ohio University, Pflaum moved the company to New York City where he split the company into two divisions, Element 9 Recordings, specializing in music publishing and Element 9.0, specializing in digital marketing.

Element 9 Recordings was nominated for a Grammy Award in 2008 in the category of Best Rap Song for their role as music publisher for Crank That (Soulja Boy) by Soulja Boy.

In November 2009, the record label division, Element 9 Muzik, was formed. Shortly after, the company announced a partnership with Fontana Distribution, the independent distribution arm of Universal Music Group, for international distribution for artists signed to the label. The label division is headed by music industry veteran Tony Franklin. Stu Pflaum serves as Vice President for the label.

The first release from the Element 9 record label was Arms & Hammers by West Coast rap group Strong Arm Steady. The album was released in February 2011.

In November 2011, the company released Habits of the Heart by Idle Warship, which is composed of rapper Talib Kweli and singer Res. Prior to the album's official street date, the label released the album through the Spotify music service. The advance release was the first instance in which a United States based music company debuted a project far in advance using the Spotify service. The move was viewed as bold by music and technology critics and a counterweight to the release strategies of artists such as Coldplay and Adele, who had refused to make their music available through Spotify.

== Releases ==
- 2011: Strong Arm Steady - Arms & Hammers
- 2011: Idle Warship - Habits of the Heart

== Awards and nominations ==
- Grammy Awards
  - 2008: Best Rap Song: "Crank That (Soulja Boy)" (Nominated)

== See also ==
- List of record labels
