= Graph Nobel =

Canadian musician

- Born: Toronto, Ontario, Canada
- Genres: Pop; punk rock; hip hop
- Occupations: Singer; songwriter; rapper

Graph Nobel is a Canadian singer, songwriter and rapper. Her music is "hip-hop inspired with punk rock abandon".

Born and raised in Toronto, Ontario to Trinidadian parents. Nobel tributes several genres as an influence; as is evident in her performances which encompass various genres normally regarded as incompatible.

== Life and career ==
Nobel, born in Toronto to Trinidadian parents, was exposed to the musical styles of parang and calypso and soca of the Trinidadian culture, as well as reggae music. Nobel began theatre at a young age allowing her an early introduction to the arts. She discovered hip hop in her teenage years, which inspired her to explore her creative abilities as an artist. Nobel, upon reflection of her growth as an artist, cites the video for "Bonita Applebum" by a Tribe Called Quest as a muse for such creative possibilities.

Nobel's hip-hop inspired ambition of becoming an emcee led her to move to New York, in hopes of immersing herself in the city's hip-hop scene. After returning from New York City, she continued to explore new genres and push creative boundaries. However, Nobel's passion for exploring new sounds conflicted with the interests of her female hip-hop group, Gravity, causing the group to split on creative differences. Nobel became part of Black Corners collective, a collection of artists who chose a "progressive approach to music", avoiding the boundaries of a single genre. In the process, Nobel developed a distinct sound, incorporating atmospheric guitars, hip-hop beats, heavy bass lines, samples, string arrangements and innovative programming.

In August 2002, Nobel performed at the 6th Toronto Urban Music Festival. In September 2002, Nobel received CBC's Galaxie Rising Stars Award.

In 2007, she made recordings with labels Aftermath (Dr. Dre, Che Pope, Mark Batson) and BME (Lil Jon). In May 2008, Nobel became the third member of the electro-rap group Idle Warship alongside (Talib Kweli and Res) releasing their "Party Robot" mixtape (October 2009). Nobel has also worked with Muja Messiah, Simon Wilcox, Pharrell Williams, N.E.R.D., The Neptunes, The Clipse, Questlove, Chantal Kraviazuck, Kardinal Official.

Notable collaborations include recordings with:"Wikked Lil Grrrls" lead single from Esthero's "Wikked Lil Grrls" album featured in the film Miss Congeniality2 also on television shows Boston Legal, Las Vegas and in commercial spots for Sex in the City and Desperate Housewives. Hawksley Workman's "Smoke Baby" from Lover/Fighter, G. Love on "Love" on War Child's Peace Songs, Artists For War Child with fellow Canadians Jully Black, Esthero & Keshia Chanté on "Life" from Much Music's Much Dance 2004 compilation and BrassMunk, Tone Mason, and G. Stokes on "The Throwback". Nobel has also performed on stage with artists The Roots, Sam Roberts, Cody Chesnutt, Metric, Ron Sexsmith.

== Collaboration ==
- Tone Mason f. BrassMunk, G Stokes - "The Throwback"
- G. Love - "Love" (from War Child's Peace Songs)
- Artists For WarChild Canada - "Life" (Much Dance 2004 compilation along with Jully Black, Esthero, & Keshia Chanté)
- Hawksley Workman - "Smoke Baby" (from Lover/Fighter)
- Graph Nobel, Talib Kweli and RES (Idle Warship) - "Black Snake Moan"
- Belinda Peregrin - "Contigo O Sin Ti"
- Esthero - "Wikked Lil Girls", "Fastlane", "If The Mood", "Bad Boy Clyde"
- Drowning Girl formerly known as The Hill Band- "Caught By the Rope"
- Idle Warship - "Party Robot"
- The Clipse - "Champion"(Til the Casket Drops)
- Muja Messiah and Graph Nobel - "Swing First"
