= Deep Hearted =

Studio album by Strong Arm Steady
- Released: August 28, 2007
- Genre: Hip-hop
- Length: 59:14
- Label: Nature Sounds
- Producers: Blaqthoven; Da Riffs; DJ Babu; DJ Khalil; Dubb Knox; Evidence; J Macc; J. Thrill; Madlib; Thayod Ausar

Strong Arm Steady chronology
Deep Hearted (2007)	In Search of Stoney Jackson (2010)

Professional ratings
Review scores
Source	Rating
HipHopDX	3.5/5
RapReviews	6.5/10

Deep Hearted is the debut studio album by American hip-hop group Strong Arm Steady. It was released on August 28, 2007, through Nature Sounds. Production was handled by DJ Khalil, Da Riffs, J. Thrill, Thayod Ausar, Blaqthoven, DJ Babu, Dubb Knox, Evidence, J Macc and Madlib, with Devin "Dev 1" Horwitz, Phil Da Agony and Krondon serving as executive producers. It features guest appearances from Planet Asia, Talib Kweli, Black Thought, Blaqthoven, Chamillionaire, Dilated Peoples, Ina Williams, Jelly Roll, Juvenile, PNB (Pop 'N Bullets), Ras Kass, Saukrates, Styliztik Jones, Tha Alkaholiks, The Game and Xzibit.

== Track listing ==
No.	Title	Producer(s)	Length
1.	"Intro" (featuring Jack Nicholson and The Game)	Dubb Knox	1:48
2.	"The Movement" (featuring Planet Asia)	Thayod Ausar	4:16
3.	"U Ain't Me" (featuring Chamillionaire, Ras Kass and Xzibit)	Da Riffs	4:43
4.	"Bloody Money" (featuring PNB (Pop 'N Bullets) and Jelly Roll)	DJ Khalil	4:25
5.	"Co-Operation" (featuring Dilated Peoples)	DJ Babu	4:08
6.	"Clean Up" (featuring Saukrates and Black Thought)	Madlib	3:26
7.	"One Step" (featuring Talib Kweli)	Blaqthoven	3:32
8.	"I Can't Wait" (featuring Tha Alkaholiks and Styliztik Jones)	Thayod Ausar	4:01
9.	"King in the Deck" (featuring Planet Asia)	Da Riffs	4:17
10.	"Come and Get Me" (featuring Ina Williams)	DJ Khalil	4:57
11.	"Streetlights" (featuring Talib Kweli)	Evidence	4:35
12.	"My Homies" (featuring Blaqthoven)	J. Thrill	4:15
13.	"Wreckless Words"	J. Thrill	3:51
14.	"On the Grind"	DJ Khalil	3:39
15.	"Dirty Dirty" (featuring Juvenile)	J Macc	3:21
Total length:			59:14
