= Hostile Gospel =

Single by Talib Kweli featuring Sizzla

from the album Eardrum
- Released: 2007
- Recorded: 2007
- Length: 5:22
- Label: Blacksmith Music; Warner Bros. Records
- Songwriters: Talib Kweli; Justin Smith; Paul Greedus; Didier Marouani
- Producer: Just Blaze

Talib Kweli featuring Sizzla singles chronology
"Get By" (2003)	"Hostile Gospel" (2007)

Music video
- "Hostile Gospel" on YouTube

Hostile Gospel is a two Part edition song by American hip hop artist Talib Kweli. The song was released as the second video from his studio album, Eardrum (2007). "Part 1" was produced by American hip hop producer Just Blaze. "Hostile Gospel Part 2" was produced by American hip hop producer DJ Khalil and featured reggae artist Sizzla.

There is also a remix to the "Part 1" version which features rappers Joell Ortiz and Blu and R&B group Nina Sky.

== Music video ==
The music video was released on March 9, 2008 The video appeared as the "New Joint of the Day" on BET's 106 & Park on March 9, 2008.
