= Liberation (Talib Kweli and Madlib album) =

Studio album by Talib Kweli & Madlib
- Released: March 20, 2007 (official)
- Genre: Hip-hop
- Length: 30:12
- Label: Blacksmith Music
- Producer: Madlib

Talib Kweli & Madlib chronology
Liberation (2007)	Liberation 2 (2023)

Talib Kweli chronology
Right About Now: The Official Sucka Free Mix CD (2006)	Liberation (2007)	Eardrum (2007)

Madlib chronology
Beat Konducta Vol 1-2: Movie Scenes (2006)	Liberation (2007)	Yesterdays Universe (2007)

Alternative cover

Liberation is a collaborative album by Talib Kweli and Madlib. It was made available as a free download from Stones Throw's Rappcats website, and Kweli and Madlib's MySpace pages for the first week of 2007, beginning New Year's Eve 2007. It was removed about a week later. One cover for the album is an adaptation of a piece by guerrilla artist Banksy, and an alternative cover (given away as a print-ready download) is a collage of Talib Kweli, a dollar sign, and the Statue of Liberty.

Liberation 2 was released in 2023.

== Reception ==
Professional ratings
Review scores
Source	Rating
AllHipHop	4/5 stars
AllMusic	3.5/5 stars
HipHopDX	4/5 stars
RapReviews.com	8/10
Stylus Magazine	A−

A.J. Henriques of Stylus Magazine gave Liberation a grade of A−, commenting that "Talib Kweli sounds more energized rhyming over Madlib's production than he has in years" and "Madlib has crafted his most traditionally rappable beats since his work with Lootpack."

It was ranked at 53 on PopMatters' "101 Hip-Hop Albums of 2007" list.

== Track listing ==
No.	Title	Length
1.	"The Show"	2:21
2.	"Funny Money"	3:04
3.	"Time Is Right"	2:17
4.	"Engine Running" (featuring Consequence)	3:39
5.	"Over the Counter"	4:05
6.	"The Function" (featuring Strong Arm Steady)	4:09
7.	"Happy Home" (featuring Candice Anderson)	5:50
8.	"Soul Music" (featuring Res)	2:29
9.	"What Can I Do?"	2:18
