= Stereo Type (album) =

Studio album by Strong Arm Steady and Statik Selektah
- Released: August 14, 2012
- Genre: Underground hip-hop
- Length: 54:51
- Label: Stones Throw
- Producer: Statik Selektah

Strong Arm Steady chronology
Arms & Hammers (2011)	Stereo Type (2012)

Statik Selektah chronology
2012 (2012)	Stereo Type (2012)	Ambition (2012)

Stereo Type is a collaborative studio album by American Los Angeles-based rap trio Strong Arm Steady and Boston-based hip-hop record producer Statik Selektah. It was released on August 14, 2012, through Stones Throw Records. Production was handled by Statik Selektah, who also served as executive producer together with Peanut Butter Wolf and SAS member Krondon, with additional production by J Rocc. It features guest appearances from Chace Infinite, Planet Asia, Baby D, Bad Lucc, Black Hippy, Casey Veggies, David Banner, Dom Kennedy, Double R, Fiend, Picas0, Reks, Skeme and Tri State.

The album was preceded by a six-track extended play, released by the same title of Stereo Type on July 17, 2012. Rapper/producer Oh No released a nine-track remix EP titled Stereo Jr. on December 1, 2012.

== Critical reception ==
Professional ratings
Aggregate scores
Source	Rating
Metacritic	81/100
Review scores
Source	Rating
AllMusic	4/5 stars
HipHopDX	4/5
XXL	3/5 (L)

Stereo Type was met with generally favorable reviews from music critics. At Metacritic, which assigns a normalized rating out of 100 to reviews from mainstream publications, the album received an average score of 81, based on four reviews.

AllMusic's David Jeffries resumed: "this is the worthy sequel to the group's Madlib collaboration In Search of Stoney Jackson, and that's meant as high praise". Jesse Fairfax of HipHopDX wrote that the album "finds both Statik and Strong Arm Steady breaking new ground that is free of expectations and limitations, proving themselves capable of making relatable music that can't be boxed in and assigned a personality". In his mixed review for XXL, Calvin Stovall concluded: "the industry veterans offer a release that's thoughtful and well-crafted".

== Track listing ==
No.	Title	Length
1.	"Truth of the Truth"	3:24
2.	"Premium"	5:10
3.	"Forever" (featuring Chace Infinite)	2:35
4.	"Born Into It" (featuring Bad Lucc)	4:03
5.	"Do Ya Thang Girl (Jook)" (featuring Casey Veggies and Picas0)	3:54
6.	"On My Job" (featuring Skeme)	3:33
7.	"La Blues" (featuring Planet Asia and Tri-State)	3:55
8.	"Classic"	4:35
9.	"Through the Motions" (featuring David Banner and Fiend)	4:13
10.	"Married to the Game" (featuring Chace Infinite and Double R)	4:16
11.	"Fair Fight" (featuring Black Hippy)	4:21
12.	"Back On Up" (featuring Planet Asia)	2:25
13.	"Outta Control" (featuring Reks)	4:07
14.	"Smoke On" (featuring Dom Kennedy and Baby D)	4:20
Total length:		54:51

== Personnel ==
- Marvin "Krondon" Jones – vocals, executive producer
- Jason "Phil Da Agony" Smith – vocals
- Charles "Mitchy Slick" Mitchell – vocals
- Patrick "Statik Selektah" Baril – producer, mixing, executive producer
- Aaron "Chace Infinite" Johnson – vocals (tracks: 3, 10)
- Terence "Bad Lucc" Harden – vocals (track 4)
- Casey "Casey Veggies" Jones – vocals (track 5)
- Jeremiah "Picas0" Aubert – vocals (track 5)
- Lonnie "Skeme" Kimble – vocals (track 6)
- Jason "Planet Asia" Green – vocals (tracks: 7, 12)
- Donti "Tri State" Ceruti – vocals (track 7)
- Lavell "David Banner" Crump – vocals (track 9)
- Richard "Fiend" Jones – vocals (track 9)
- Rick "Double R" Robinson – vocals (track 10)
- Herbert "Ab-Soul" Stevens – vocals (track 11)
- Johnny "Jay Rock" McKinzie – vocals (track 11)
- Quincy "Schoolboy Q" Hanley – vocals (track 11)
- Corey "Reks" Christie – vocals (track 13)
- Dominic "Dom Kennedy" Hunn – vocals (track 14)
- Donald "Baby D" Jenkins – vocals (track 14)
- Jason "J Rocc" Jackson – additional producer
- Chris "Peanut Butter Wolf" Manak – executive producer
- Upendo Taylor – design
