= Habits of the Heart =

2011 studio album by Idle Warship

Studio album by Idle Warship
- Released: November 1, 2011
- Recorded: 2011
- Genre: Alternative hip hop; electronic
- Length: 40:00
- Label: Blacksmith; Element 9
- Producer: C. Whitfield; DJ Khalil; Farhot; Maxwell Drummey; M-Phazes; S. Mckie

Talib Kweli chronology
Gutter Rainbows (2011)	Habits of the Heart (2011)	Prisoner of Conscience (2013)

Res chronology
Black.Girls.Rock! (2009)	Habits of the Heart (2011)	ReFried Mac Ep (2012)

Habits of the Heart is the debut and only studio album by Idle Warship, a collaboration between hip-hop artist Talib Kweli and singer Res, it was released via Blacksmith Records and Element 9 on November 1, 2011.

== Critical reception ==
Professional ratings
Review scores
Source	Rating
ACRN	7/10 stars
Colorado Daily	(Very favorable)

Habits of the Heart received general acclaim from music critics. Ross Lockhart described the album as being "chock full of craziness" with a "unique blend" of genres and a "high energy" that "never relents". Lockhart lent particular praise to Res, writing that though "Kweli makes a few quality appearances...she steals the show", describing her vocals as "sultry and powerful." Furthermore, Lockhart favorably described the song's "hooks" as "ridiculously catchy" and the vocals "pure listening pleasure". However, he noted that the album "can get a bit fluffy" going on to write that "these tracks wouldn't seem out of place on the soundtrack to an EA sports video game" Meanwhile, Colorado Daily writer Ashley Dean called the album "phenomenal", citing their "organic" blend of "hip-hop, soul, funk, rock and electro influences" as "an achievement that's especially satisfying". Dean also highlighted "Enemy", describing it as "an intense, Latin-flavored funk number", "Kayta", "Are You In" and "Covered in Fantasy".

== Track listing ==
No.	Title	Writer(s)	Producer(s)	Length
1.	"Enemy"	S. Ballard; T. Greene; F. Samadzada	Farhot	3:19
2.	"The Floor"	K. Ross; T. Greene; F. Samadzada	Farhot	4:00
3.	"God Bless My Soul"	S. Ballard; T. Green; S. Mckie; C. Whitfield	S. Mckie; C. Whitfield	3:10
4.	"Are You In" (featuring Kay Cola)	S. Ballard; T. Greene; K. Cole; K. Rahman	DJ Khalil	3:11
5.	"System Addict" (featuring Jean Grae & Jay Knocka)	S. Ballard, T. Greene; T. Ibrahim; J. Wallace; K. Rahman	DJ Khalil	3:35
6.	"Laser Beams"	S. Ballard; T. Greene; K. Rahman; P. Injeti; E. Alcok; L. Rodriguez	DJ Khalil	3:23
7.	"Covered in Fantasy" (featuring Chester French & John Forté)	S. Ballard; T. Greene; J. Forté; M. Drummey; C. Bashford; D.A. Wallach	Maxwell Drummey	5:00
8.	"Rat Race"	K. Ross; T. Greene; F. Samadzada	Farhot	3:55
9.	"Katya" (featuring Michelle Williams)	T. Greene; K. Ross; M. Williams; F. Samadzada	Farhot	3:39
10.	"Beautifully Bad"	T. Greene; Zenya Bashford; Andre Fennell; Dwayne Shippy; F. Samadzada	Farhot	3:36
11.	"Driving Me Insane"	S. Ballard; T. Greene; K. Ross	Farhot	3:16

iTunes deluxe edition bonus tracks
No.	Title	Writer(s)	Producer(s)	Length
12.	"Burning Desire"	T. Greene; C. Bashford; N. Guiland; D. Shippy; S. Allen; M. Landon	M-Phazes	5:07
