= Gutter Rainbows =

Studio album by Talib Kweli
- Released: January 25, 2011
- Recorded: 2010
- Genre: Hip-hop
- Length: 49:03
- Label: Javotti Media; 3D
- Producer: 6th Sense; 88-Keys; E. Jones; Khrysis; Marco Polo; Maurice Brown; M-Phazes; Nick Speed; Oh No; Shuko; Ski Beatz; Symbolyc One

Talib Kweli chronology
Revolutions per Minute (2010)	Gutter Rainbows (2011)	Habits of the Heart (2011)

Singles from Gutter Rainbows
- 1. "Cold Rain" Released: November 30, 2010

Gutter Rainbows is the fourth solo studio album by American rapper Talib Kweli. Originally intended to be released in only digital format, it was announced that Duck Down Music would step in to see the album got a CD release, including an import edition and a special edition with extras. The album was released on January 25, 2011, through Javotti Media and 3D.

The album was produced by Symbolyc One, 6th Sense, 88-Keys, E. Jones, Khrysis, Marco Polo, Maurice Brown, M-Phazes, Nick Speed, Oh No, Shuko, Ski Beatz, and Caleb McCampbell. It features guest appearances from Blaqthoven, Chace Infinite, Jean Grae, Kendra Ross, Nigel Hall, Outasight, and Sean Price.

In the United States, the album debuted at number 29 on the Billboard 200, number 7 on the Top R&B/Hip-Hop Albums, number 5 on the Top Rap Albums and number 4 on the Independent Albums charts with 13,900 copies sold in its first week. The album fell 73 spots in its second week selling nearly 20,000 units in two weeks combined.

== Critical reception ==
Professional ratings
Aggregate scores
Source	Rating
AnyDecentMusic?	6.6/10
Metacritic	71/100
Review scores
Source	Rating
Beats Per Minute	81/100%
Cokemachineglow	58/100%
Consequence of Sound	C+
HipHopDX	3/5
Los Angeles Times	2.5/4 stars
Pitchfork	7.4/10
PopMatters	6/10 stars
Rolling Stone	3/5 stars
Spin	7/10 marks
Tiny Mix Tapes	2/5 marks

Gutter Rainbows was met with generally favourable reviews from music critics. At Metacritic, which assigns a normalized rating out of 100 to reviews from mainstream publications, the album received an average score of 71 based on twenty-one reviews. The aggregator AnyDecentMusic? has the critical consensus of the album at a 6.6 out of 10, based on twelve reviews.

Chase McMullen of Beats Per Minute praised the album, stating it "may well be the best thing Kweli has done since Quality". Nate Patrin of Pitchfork resumed: "in short, it's familiar without feeling rote". Alex Young of Consequence wrote: "in that right, Gutter Rainbows is the ultimate success. However, in terms of accessibility, he's done better work, and this release will probably just go down as a good, but not a great Talib Kweli album". Mosi Reeves of Spin found "the production (from Ski Beatz, 88-Keys, others) adds florid, melodramatic choruses to jazzy boom-bap tracks, blunting the impact of Kweli's dogged street intellectualism". Jeff Weiss of Los Angeles Times wrote: "accordingly, Gutter Rainbows too often feels like an unfulfilled promise--an excess of concrete and not enough vibrancy".

In mixed reviews, Slava "Roman Cooper" Kuperstein of HipHopDX stated: "Gutter Rainbows is a fairly easy spin, and can go into the listener's steady rotation in a pinch. That being said, this feels a bit like a subdued version of Eardrum". David Amidon of PopMatters noted that "despite limp production, Kweli is often a great presence here, and fans certainly won't be disappointed". Jody Rosen of Rolling Stone concluded: "Gutter Rainbows is unabashed conscious-rap classicism, with a luscious, string-swamped soul sound and rhymes that tout the MC's left-of-center cred". Cokemachineglow's Colin McGowan wrote: "there's a lot of rappity-rap clichés at work here: overwrought punchlines, vague disses, bitching about the industry. Kweli spends a good chunk of the album acting like a drunk, unemployed superhero, stumbling into supermarkets to aid old ladies whose purses are fully in their possession". David Morris of Tiny Mix Tapes stated: "Kweli still has an ear for beats, and despite some particular low points here, his lyrics were always overshadowed by his flow, which is as sharp as ever".

== Track listing ==
No.	Title	Writer(s)	Producer(s)	Length
1.	"After the Rain"	Talib Kweli Greene; Charles Njapa; Tsidi Ibrahim	88-Keys	1:27
2.	"Gutter Rainbows"	Greene; Mark Landon; Robert Mandell	M-Phazes	4:10
3.	"So Low"	Greene; Christoph Bauss; M. Wright	Shuko	3:14
4.	"Palookas" (featuring Sean Price)	Greene; Sean Price; Marco Bruno	Marco Polo	3:57
5.	"Mr. International" (featuring Nigel Hall)	Greene; Nigel Hall; Larry Griffin	S1; Caleb (co.)	3:36
6.	"I'm on One"	Greene; Christopher Tyson	Khrysis	3:55
7.	"Wait for You" (featuring Kendra Ross)	Greene; Kendra Ross; Griffin	S1; Caleb (co.)	3:45
8.	"Ain't Waiting" (featuring Outasight)	Greene; Richard Andrew; Michael Kawesch	6th Sense	3:57
9.	"Cold Rain"	Greene; David Willis	Ski Beatz	2:36
10.	"Friends & Family"	Greene; Eric Jones	E. Jones	3:57
11.	"Tater Tot"	Greene; Nicholas Speed	Nick Speed	2:56
12.	"How You Love Me" (featuring Blaq Toven)	Greene; Anthony Ransom		4:04
13.	"Uh Oh" (featuring Jean Grae)	Greene; Ibrahim; Michael Jackson	Oh No	4:15
14.	"Self Savior" (featuring Chace Infinite)	Greene; Maurice Brown	Maurice Brown	3:14
Total length:				49:03

iTunes deluxe edition bonus tracks
No.	Title	Writer(s)	Producer(s)	Length
15.	"How You Love Me (Live from BK Bowl)" (featuring Blaq Toven)	Greene; Ransom	Blaqthoven	3:46
16.	"Go Now" (featuring Iron Solomon and Jean Grae)	Greene; Ibrahim; Patrick Mathore	DJ Ty'neg	4:37

Amazon bonus track
No.	Title	Writer(s)	Producer(s)	Length
15.	"GMB (Grown Man Business)"	Greene; Jones	E. Jones	5:06

== Personnel ==
- Talib Kweli Greene — vocals, executive producer
- Tony Williams — vocals (track 1)
- Charles "88-Keys" Njapa — additional vocals & producer (track 1)
- Tsidi "Jean Grae" Ibrahim — additional vocals (track 1), vocals (track 13)
- Kendra Ross — additional vocals (track 3), vocals (track 7)
- Shareese "Res" Ballard — additional vocals (track 3)
- Sean Price — vocals (track 4)
- Nigel Hall — vocals & additional keyboards (track 5), piano (track 9)
- Richard "Outasight" Andrew — vocals (track 8)
- Anthony "Blaqthoven" Ransom — vocals (track 12)
- Aaron "Chace Infinite" Johnson — vocals (track 14)
- Winston "Wentz" Nelson — Rhodes electric piano & flute (track 1)
- Michael Loren LaValle — guitar & bass (track 1)
- Michael Geldreich — piano (track 3)
- Eric Krasno — guitar (track 3)
- Adam Deitch — drums (track 3)
- Caleb McCampbell — additional keyboards (track 5), co-producer (tracks: 5, 7)
- Jarriel Carter — horns & horns arranger (track 7)
- Harrison Young — piano (track 9)
- John Cave — guitar (track 9)
- Brady Watt — bass (track 9)
- Daru Jones — drums (track 9)
- Brian Cockerham — bass (track 10)
- Masayuki Hirano — keyboards (track 11)
- Jon Dixon — synthesizer (track 11)
- Chad — guitar (track 11)
- Louis Cato — bass (track 11)
- Borahm Lee — keyboards (track 13)
- Mark "M-Phazes" Landon — producer (track 2)
- Christoph "Shuko" Bauss — producer (track 3)
- Marco "Marco Polo" Bruno — producer (track 4)
- Larry "Symbolyc One" Griffin Jr. — producer (tracks: 5, 7), horns arranger & mixing (track 7)
- Christopher "Khrysis" Tyson — producer (track 6)
- Michael "6th Sense" Kawesch — producer (track 8)
- David "Ski Beatz" Willis — producer (track 9)
- Eric Jones — producer (track 10)
- Nick Speed — producer & programming (track 11)
- Michael "Oh No" Jackson — producer (track 13)
- Maurice Brown — producer (track 14)
- Alby Cohen — recording (tracks: 1, 5, 8, 9, 11, 13, 14)
- Frederico "C Sik" Lopez — recording (tracks: 2, 12), mixing (track 12)
- Eddie Krakaur — recording (tracks: 3–8, 10, 11)
- Maurizio "Irko" Sera — mixing (track 1)
- Steve Baughman — mixing (tracks: 2, 5, 6, 8, 10)
- Mike Gibney — mixing (tracks: 3, 4, 13, 14)
- Cid D Kid — mixing (tracks: 9, 11)
- Chris Koltay — engineering (track 11)
- Mike Wyatt — engineering (track 11)
- Kevin Calloway — session coordinator (track 11)
- Kenyatta "Buckshot" Blake — associate executive producer
- Drew "Dru-Ha" Friedman — associate executive producer
- DeChazier Stokes-Johnson — artwork
- Reuben Levi — additional artwork
- Noah Friedman — project coordinator

== Charts ==
Chart (2011)	Peak position
Swiss Albums (Schweizer Hitparade)	86
UK R&B Albums (OCC)	35
UK Independent Albums (OCC)	32
US Billboard 200	29
US Top R&B/Hip-Hop Albums (Billboard)	7
US Top Rap Albums (Billboard)	5
US Independent Albums (Billboard)	4
