= The Beautiful Struggle =

Studio album by Talib Kweli
- Released: September 28, 2004
- Recorded: 2003–2004
- Genre: Alternative hip hop
- Length: 53:40
- Label: Rawkus; Geffen
- Producer: Hi-Tek; the Neptunes; Supa Dave West; Kanye West; Just Blaze; J. R. Rotem; Midi Mafia; Charlemagne; Tone Mason; Amadeus

Talib Kweli chronology
Quality (2002)	The Beautiful Struggle (2004)	Eardrum (2007)

Professional ratings
Aggregate scores
Source	Rating
Metacritic	66/100
Review scores
Source	Rating
AllMusic	3/5 stars
The Austin Chronicle	1.5/5 stars
Robert Christgau	(1-star Honorable Mention)
Entertainment Weekly	B
The Guardian	3/5 stars
HipHopDX	3.5/5 stars
Pitchfork Media	7.6/10
PopMatters	5/10 stars
Spin	B+
Vibe	3.5/5 stars

The Beautiful Struggle is the second studio album by American rapper Talib Kweli. The album was released on September 28, 2004, by Rawkus Records and Geffen Records. It features guest appearances from Common, Faith Evans, Anthony Hamilton, Mary J. Blige, and John Legend.

The album was produced by Kanye West, the Neptunes, Supa Dave West, Just Blaze, and Hi-Tek. The first single, "I Try" featuring Mary J. Blige, was fairly popular as a music video, followed by the second single, "Never Been in Love".

== Track listing ==
Credits adapted from the album's liner notes.

No.	Title	Writer(s)	Producer(s)	Length
1.	"Going Hard"	Talib Kweli Greene; Henri Charlemagne; Corey Smyth	Charlemagne	3:50
2.	"Back Up Offa Me"	Greene; Jason "Phil The Agony" Smith; Tony Cottrell	Hi-Tek	3:38
3.	"Broken Glass"	Greene; Chad Hugo; Pharrell Williams	The Neptunes	3:11
4.	"We Know" (feat. Faith Evans)	Greene; Kendra Ross; Dave West	Supa Dave West	3:43
5.	"A Game"	Greene; Antwan Thompson	Amadeus	3:36
6.	"I Try" (feat. Mary J. Blige)	Greene; John Stephens; Mary J. Blige; Kanye West	Kanye West	4:25
7.	"Around My Way" (feat. John Legend)	Greene; Charlemagne	Charlemagne	4:48
8.	"We Got the Beat" (feat. Res)	Greene; Kevin Risto; Waynne Nugent	Midi Mafia	3:20
9.	"Work It Out"	Greene; Cottrell; Jonathan Rotem	Hi-Tek; J.R.	4:20
10.	"Ghetto Show" (feat. Common & Anthony Hamilton)	Greene; Lonnie Lynn; D. West	Supa Dave West	4:47
11.	"Black Girl Pain" (feat. Jean Grae)	Greene; Tsidi Ibrahim; Risto; Nugent; Anthony McIntyre	Midi Mafia; Tone Mason	5:04
12.	"Never Been in Love"	Greene; Justin Smith	Just Blaze	5:01
13.	"Beautiful Struggle"	Greene; Cottrell	Hi-Tek	4:00

Sample Credits

- "Around My Way" contains replayed elements of "Every Little Thing She Does Is Magic" by the Police.

== Personnel ==
Credits adapted from the album's liner notes.

- Mark Batson – piano (track 1), keyboards (track 10)
- Steve Baughman – mixing (tracks 2, 6, 9, 13)
- Elizabeth "Yummy" Bingham – additional vocals (track 11)
- Mary J. Blige – featured artist (track 6)
- Tom Brick – mastering
- David Brown – engineer (track 12)
- Charlemagne – producer (tracks 1, 7)
- Andrew Coleman – engineer (track 3)
- Common – featured artist (track 10)
- Dave Dar – engineer (tracks 1, 4–8, 7, 8, 10, 11), mixing (track 1), co-executive producer
- Dion – additional vocals (track 2)
- Faith Evans – featured artist (track 4), additional vocals (track 3)
- Brian Garten – engineer (track 3)
- Anthony Hamilton – featured artist (track 10)
- Hi-Tek – producer and engineer (tracks 2, 9, 13)
- Chad Hugo – producer (track 3)
- Jun Ishizeki – assistant engineer (track 3)
- Glen Jeffries – guitar (tracks 9, 13)
- Just Blaze – producer (track 12)
- Gimel "Young Guru" Keaton – mixing (tracks 5, 12)
- J.R. – producer (track 9), additional keyboards (track 13)
- Krondon – additional vocals (track 2)
- Talib Kweli – main artist, executive producer
- John Legend – featured artist (track 7)
- Alan Mason – vocal engineer for Mary J. Blige (track 6)
- Midi Mafia – producers (tracks 8, 11)
- Tiffany Mynon – additional vocals (tracks 9, 11)
- Jamia Simone Nash – additional vocals (track 11)
- Olivia Charnae Nash – additional vocals (track 11)
- Axel Niehaus – mixing (tracks 7, 11)
- Bob Power – mixing (tracks 1, 4, 8, 10)
- Res – featured artist (track 8), additional vocals (track 1)
- Justin Shturtz – assistant engineer (tracks 5, 11)
- Corey Smyth – executive producer
- Spacey T – guitar (track 8)
- Phil Tan – mixing (track 3)
- Alex Thomas – additional vocals (track 2)
- Antwan "Amadeus" Thompson – producer (track 5)
- Tone Mason – producer (track 11)
- Kanye West – producer (track 6)
- Supa Dave West – producer (tracks 4, 10)
- Pharrell Williams – producer and additional vocals (track 3)
- Dave Young – additional vocals (track 12)
- Anthony Zeller – assistant engineer (tracks 1, 4, 6–8, 10, 11), mixing assistant (track 9)

== Chart positions ==
Chart (2004)	Peak position
Canadian Albums (Nielsen SoundScan)	39
Canadian R&B Albums (Nielsen SoundScan)	11
US Billboard 200	14
US Top R&B/Hip-Hop Albums (Billboard)	3
