= Revolutions per Minute (Reflection Eternal album) =

Studio album by Reflection Eternal
- Released: May 18, 2010
- Recorded: 2008–2010; Electric Lady Studios (Greenwich Village, New York)
- Genre: Hip hop
- Length: 60:35
- Label: Blacksmith; Rawkus; Warner Bros.
- Producer: Hi-Tek

Reflection Eternal chronology
Train of Thought (2000)	Revolutions per Minute (2010)

Talib Kweli chronology
Eardrum (2007)	Revolutions per Minute (2010)	Gutter Rainbows (2011)

Hi-Tek chronology
Hi-Teknology 3 (2007)	Revolutions per Minute (2010)

Singles from Revolutions
- 1. "Back Again" Released: June 9, 2009; 2. "Just Begun" Released: February 2, 2010; 3. "In This World" Released: March 23, 2010; 4. "Strangers (Paranoid)" Released: April 13, 2010; 5. "Midnight Hour" Released: April 27, 2010

Revolutions per Minute is the second studio album by American hip hop duo Reflection Eternal, released May 18, 2010, on Blacksmith Records and Rawkus Records. Composed of rapper Talib Kweli and DJ/hip hop producer Hi-Tek, it is the duo's follow-up to their collaborative debut Train of Thought (2000).

The album debuted at number 18 on the US Billboard 200 chart, selling 21,000 copies in its first week. Upon its release, Revolutions per Minute received generally positive reviews from most music critics.

== Background ==
Like the first album, Revolutions per Minute was recorded at Electric Lady Studios. It is their second album after a 10-year hiatus. Hi-Tek produced the entire album. The album features five singles: "Back Again", "Just Begun" with Mos Def, Jay Electronica and J. Cole, "In This World", "Strangers (Paranoid)" with Bun B, and "Midnight Hour" with Estelle. The album was released May 18, 2010, on Blacksmith Records and Rawkus Records.

== Reception ==
=== Commercial performance ===
The album debuted at number 18 on the US Billboard 200 chart with first-week sales of 21,000 copies. It also entered at number five on Billboard's R&B/Hip-Hop Albums, at number three on its Rap Albums, and at number 11 on its Digital Albums chart.

=== Critical response ===
Professional ratings
Review scores
Source	Rating
AllMusic	4/5 stars
Alternative Press	4/5 stars
The A.V. Club	B
Boston Phoenix	3/4 stars
Pitchfork	7.5/10
PopMatters	8/10
RapReviews	9/10
Slant Magazine	4/5 stars
Spin	3.5/5 stars
Tom Hull – on the Web	A−

Upon its release, the album received positive reviews from most music critics, based on an aggregate score of 80/100 from Metacritic. AllMusic writer Gregory Heaney commended Kweli's and Hi-Tek's musical chemistry and wrote "Hi-Tek's soul-infused beats create the perfect laid-back atmosphere for Kweli's casual verbal acrobatics, crafting beats that bring the listener into the group's chilled-out space with their minimal aesthetic". Steve Juon of RapReviews gave it a 9/10 rating and praised Kweli's rapping, stating "Kweli is using his keen powers of observation to see the world for what it really is, and then translate that knowledge into a musical form you can simultaneously enjoy and learn from". Exclaim!'s Anupa Mistry wrote that Revolutions per Minute is "doused in their working chemistry". Boston Phoenix writer Chris Faraone gave it 3 out of 4 stars and stated "The chemistry between these two remains bubbling". HipHopDX writer Kathy Iandoli gave it 4 out of 5 stars and wrote that it "displays the evolution of both the emcee and the deejay". Giving it an 8/10 rating, PopMatters writer Dave Heaton praised Kweli's lyrics concerning the importance of money in life, building a career in hip hop, the differences between celebrity and work, and the former's effect on a person, stating:

Taken as a whole, Revolutions Per Minute offers a specific and complicated vision of what it means to be an artist. It presents the notion that music-making is about dedication and practice, about practical business decisions as much as art, while also being a manner of “exorcising” ghosts and “testifying” to what’s going on in the world (as he puts it on “Back Again”). To sign a record deal is to enter a deal with the devil, and every musician needs to know it, Kweli notes repeatedly.

— Dave Heaton

Giving it 4 out of 5 stars, Slant Magazine writer M.T. Richards described the album as "brainy, energizing stuff" and praised Kweli's rapping, stating "Sinking his no-frills flow into calm, bassy tracks, Kweli lands punchline after punchline with the kind of finesse Jay and Common could only dream of". The A.V. Club's Nathan Rabin gave the album a B rating and wrote "Hi-Tek lacks a trademark style, but his chemistry with Kweli remains potent, even when Minute doesn't hit the heights of the duo's debut". Mosi Reeves of Spin gave the album 3½ out of 5 stars and viewed Hi-Tek's "jazz-inflected riffs and soulful vibes" as complementary to Kweli's "mercurial" style, stating "congenial beats balance intricately daring rhymes". Alternative Press writer Casey Boland gave it four out of five stars and viewed it as an improvement for Hi-Tek's producing and Kweli's rapping, stating "he sounds at home with Hi-Tek. His cadence has never locked so tightly with the tune, his lyrical flow never so sinuous". Henry Adaso of About.com noted a "musical maturation" by the duo and wrote that the album "finds Kweli masterfully marrying the physical with the philosophical atop Hi-Tek's rich palette of headphone music". Pitchfork Media's Nate Patrin gave Revolutions per Minute a 7.5/10 rating and commended its "conscious yet unpretentious lyricism delivered with acrobatic dexterity over on-point, no-gimmick beats".

== Track listing ==
- All songs produced by Hi-Tek.

No.	Title	Writer(s)	Length
1.	"RPM's"	Tony Cottrell; Daniel Seeff; John Mills-Cockell	1:06
2.	"City Playgrounds"	Cottrell; Talib Kweli Greene	4:43
3.	"Back Again" (featuring Res)	Cottrell; Greene; Shareese Ballard	3:26
4.	"Strangers (Paranoid)" (featuring Bun B)	Cottrell; Greene; Bernard Freeman; Bill Conti	2:51
5.	"In This World"	Cottrell; Greene; Belinda Lipscomb; Kimberley Briggs; Shawn Carter	3:31
6.	"Got Work (Fame)"	Cottrell; Greene	4:16
7.	"Midnight Hour" (featuring Estelle)	Cottrell; Greene; Estelle Swaray; Willie Denson; Luther Dixon	4:40
8.	"Lifting Off"	Cottrell; Greene	5:22
9.	"In the Red"	Cottrell; Greene	3:00
10.	"Black Gold (Intro)"		0:18
11.	"Ballad of the Black Gold"	Cottrell; Greene; Jerline Shelton; Maurice Commander	5:34
12.	"Just Begun" (featuring Jay Electronica, J. Cole, and Mos Def)	Cottrell; Greene; Timothy Elpadaro; Jermaine Cole; Dante Smith	3:37
13.	"Long Hot Summer"	Cottrell; Greene; Lipscomb	2:22
14.	"Get Loose" (featuring Chester French)	Cottrell; Greene; Andrew Wallach; Maxwell Drummey	5:34
15.	"So Good"	Cottrell; Greene	3:33
16.	"Ends" (featuring Bilal)	Cottrell; Greene; Bilal Oliver	3:22
17.	"My Life (Outro)"	Cottrell; Greene	3:28

Sample credits

- "RPM's" contains elements of "Hollywood Dream Trip", written and performed by John Mills-Cockell.
- "Strangers (Paranoid)" contains samples of "Redemption (Theme from Rocky II)", written and performed by Bill Conti.
- "In This World" contains elements of:
  - "What in This World's Happening to Love", written and performed by Kimberley Briggs.
  - "Moment of Clarity", written by Shawn Carter, and performed by Jay-Z.
- "Midnight Hour" contains samples of "Mama Said", written by Willie Denson and Luther Dixon, and performed by the Shirelles.
- "Ballad of the Black Gold" contains samples from "Let Me Back In", written by Jerline Shelton and Maurice Commander, and performed by Heaven and Earth.

== Personnel ==
- Naim Ali – A&R
- Steve Baughman – mixing
- Ski Beats – engineer
- Austin Briggs – engineer
- Erik "Baby Jesus" Coomes – bass, guitar
- Affion Crockett – Skit
- Dave Dar – engineer
- Nabil Elderkin – Photography
- Estelle – arranger
- Ethan Gouldbourne – keyboards
- T. Greene – arranger, composer
- Hi-Tek – producer, engineer, executive producer, mixing, Scratching, Skit, Group Member
- Daniel Jones – keyboards
- Joseph I – stylist
- Liza Joseph – A&R
- Samuel Kalandjianv – engineer, assistant engineer
- Eddie Krakaur – engineer
- Talib Kweli – executive producer, vocals, Group Member
- Belinda Lipscomb – composer, vocals
- Zach Lucas – Sax (Tenor)
- Christopher Lee Lyons – Art Direction, Design
- Midori Nishijima – A&R
- Neal Pogues – mixing
- Jack Rayner – engineer
- Daniel Seeff – bass, guitar, composer, producer
- Sha Money XL – executive producer, Management
- Corey Smyth – executive producer, Management
- Kevin Sokolniki – Assistant
- Chris Soper – assistant engineer
- Estelle Swaray – composer
- Tekzilla – vocals
- Carolyn Tracey – Package Production
- Imani Uzuri – vocals
- Pat Viala – engineer, mixing
- Ellen Wakayama – creative director, Visual Direction
- Denise A. Williams – creative director, Visual Direction
- Young Guru – arranger, engineer

== Charts ==
=== Weekly charts ===
Chart (2010)	Peak position
Canadian Albums (Nielsen SoundScan)	61
US Billboard 200	18
US Top R&B/Hip-Hop Albums (Billboard)	5
US Top Rap Albums (Billboard)	3

=== Year-end charts ===
Chart (2010)	Position
US Top R&B/Hip-Hop Albums (Billboard)	92
