= In Search of Stoney Jackson =

Studio album by Strong Arm Steady
- Released: January 26, 2010
- Recorded: 2009; Strong Arm Studios (Los Angeles, California)
- Genre: Hip-hop
- Length: 50:49
- Label: Stones Throw
- Producers: Peanut Butter Wolf (exec.); Madlib

Strong Arm Steady chronology
Deep Hearted (2007)	In Search of Stoney Jackson (2010)	Arms & Hammers (2010)

Madlib chronology
Beat Konducta Vol. 5–6: A Tribute to… (2010)	In Search of Stoney Jackson (2010)	Madlib Medicine Show (2010)

Instrumental version cover

In Search of Stoney Jackson is the second studio album by California based hip-hop group Strong Arm Steady, released on January 26, 2010 under Stones Throw Records. The album's title is a reference to actor Stoney Jackson (The White Shadow, Streets of Fire, the video for Michael Jackson's "Beat It"). The album, entirely produced by Madlib, features guest appearances from Talib Kweli, Phonte, Fashawn, Evidence, Oh No, Roscoe, Guilty Simpson and a host of underground Los Angeles rappers, as well as former Strong Arm Steady members Planet Asia and Chace Infinite. The rap vocals are mainly performed by Phil Da Agony and Krondon, as Mitchy Slick appears on only two tracks. The album is considered a collaborative album between Madlib and the L.A. hip-hop collective, who chose the beats from 200 potential compositions.

== Critical reception ==
Professional ratings
Aggregate scores
Source	Rating
Metacritic	75/100
Review scores
Source	Rating
AllMusic	4.5/5 stars
The A.V. Club	A−
Drowned in Sound	(4/10)
Dusted Magazine	(mixed)
Filter	(84/100)
Pitchfork Media	(7.1/10)
PopMatters	6/10 medals
Q Magazine	4/5 stars
Spin	(7/10)
Tiny Mix Tapes	3/5 marks

Upon its release, In Search of Stoney Jackson received generally favorable reviews from music critics. At Metacritic, which assigns a normalized rating out of 100 to reviews from mainstream critics, the album received an average score of 75, based on 11 reviews. Phil Freeman of AllMusic gave the album four and a half stars out of five, saying "From a purely instrumental standpoint, this album is the equal of the Beastie Boys' Paul's Boutique, but without the recognizable hooks—every sound here is ultra-obscure and the more entertaining for it." The A.V. Club's Nathan Rabin gave the album an A−, saying "For an in-demand producer like Madlib, it might not be good business to give some of his most stunning beats to a relatively unknown group, but Jackson is brilliant enough to elevate Strong Arm Steady to the level of cult heroes." Jeremy Moehlmann of Filter gave the album 84%, saying "Solid, workmanlike rhymes abound, but a shortage of mind-blowing moments is tempered by the absence of mediocrity." Okayplayer reviewer Jeff Harvey gave the album an 84 out of 100, saying "All three MCs, particularly an energized Phil Da Agony, deliver more than their share of memorable verses, but they never quite take ownership of the record. It feels like most of the beats were selected to suite the guests, and since there are guests on nearly every track, the end result plays like a first rate Madlib mixtape hosted by Strong Arm Steady. Still, fans of SAS, Madlib, or vintage hip-hop in general will find more than enough heavy hitting beats and gensu-sharp rhymes to keep this album in rotation until Stoney Jackson is found."

HipHopDX reviewer Michael Cusenza gave the album a four out of five, saying "In Search of Stoney Jackson is another Stones Throw gem mined by their incomparable in-house Konducta. It's a funky ride to Rap's far side in a car fabricated by Madlib, commandeered by Strong Arm Steady and a slew of able narrators." Pitchfork's Patrick Sisson gave the album a 7.1 out of ten, saying "For all Madlib's eclecticism and supposedly short attention span, his work here sounds focused and sharp. The beats aren't wasted here by any means, but a different crew could have brought out even more potential." Mosi Reeves of Spin gave the album a seven out of ten, saying "With Strong Arm Steady's MC trio of Krondon, Phil Da Agony, and Mitchy Slick (plus extended fam like Planet Asia, Phonte, and Fashawn) dropping lyrical barbs ("Telegram") and creatively reheated thug-isms ("Needle in the Haystack"), Madlib chops up loops bubbling with quirky humor and analog soul." Matt Jost of RapReviews gave the album a seven out of ten, saying "It doesn't sound like much upon first listen. But after a few spins In Search of Stoney Jackson becomes a charming little record that has quite a lot to offer despite its fragmented, uncoordinated appearance." Joe Schmoh of Sputnikmusic gave the album three and a half stars out of five, saying "That disappointment resonating from the main attraction quickly boils over, as the guests and Madlib's tasteful samples give In Search of Stoney Jackson a [sic] off-the-cuff, mixtape-ish feeling that makes it truly a fun listen. Madlib still proves he's the master of his terrain, and certain guests slay their hosts, but for the most part, it's a mix of 90s nostalgia and the new kids, and fits together perfectly."

In a mixed review, B. McGhee of Tiny Mix Tapes gave the album a three out of five, saying "These songs are alive, but there are too many cooks, and they clutter things with all their different ideas and approaches. Madlib's instrumental interludes are weird and compelling, which is no surprise, but because of the multitude of voices, his influence is more subdued than usual." PopMatters reviewer David Amidon gave the album a six out ten, saying "Stoney Jackson isn't an album with big expectations, but as a result it fails to disappoint as well. After an incredibly strong start Stoney Jackson assumes its role as a modest, strong ringing in of the hip-hop new year, and I for one am fine with that." Ben Yaster, in his review for Dusted Magazine, wrote "Like many collaborations, the material on Stoney Jackson is varied and can feel rudderless at moments." Vyvian Raoul of Drowned in Sound gave the album a four out of ten, saying "In the end, perhaps In Search… is just so inbred it's capable of little more than frenzied tail wagging on a podium – its maniac tongue lolling – all eager and expectant that someone will pin a rosette to it just for having a nice shiny coat."

== Track listing ==
No.	Title	Writer(s)	Length
1.	"Best of Times" (featuring Phonte)	P. Coleman; M. Jones; O. Jackson, Jr.; J. Smith	3:57
2.	"Cheeba Cheeba"	M. Jones; O. Jackson, Jr.; J. Smith	2:45
3.	"Chittlins & Pepsi" (featuring Planet Asia)	J. Green; M. Jones; O. Jackson, Jr.; J. Smith	4:20
4.	"Telegram"	M. Jones; O. Jackson, Jr.; J. Smith	0:59
5.	"Questions" (featuring Planet Asia and Fashawn)	J. Green; M. Jones; O. Jackson, Jr.; S. Leyva; J. Smith	4:04
6.	"Smile"	M. Jones; O. Jackson, Jr.; J. Smith	1:41
7.	"New Love" (featuring Chace Infinite and Tri-State)	D. Ceriti; A. Johnson; M. Jones; O. Jackson, Jr.; J. Smith	4:46
8.	"Get Started" (featuring Talib Kweli)	T. Greene; M. Jones; O. Jackson, Jr.; J. Smith	3:03
9.	"Interlude One"	M. Jones; O. Jackson, Jr.; J. Smith	1:09
10.	"Pressure" (featuring Sick Jacken and Mitchy Slick)	J. Gonzalez; M. Jones; O. Jackson, Jr.; C. Mitchell; J. Smith	3:46
11.	"True Champs" (featuring Montage One, Evidence, Oh No and Roc C)	M. Jones; M. Jackson; O. Jackson, Jr.; M. Perretta; D. Smith; J. Smith; T. Taylor	4:30
12.	"Needle in the Haystack" (featuring Roscoe and Guilty Simpson)	M. Jones; O. Jackson, Jr.; B. Simpson; J. Smith; D. Williams	2:01
13.	"Interlude Two"	M. Jones; O. Jackson, Jr.; J. Smith	0:26
14.	"Ambassadors" (featuring Planet Asia and Chace Infinite)	J. Green; A. Johnson; M. Jones; O. Jackson, Jr.; J. Smith	3:29
15.	"Chants"	M. Jones; O. Jackson, Jr.; J. Smith	1:08
16.	"Bark Like a Dog" (featuring Phats Bossalini and Montage One)	L. Bankoudagba; M. Jones; O. Jackson, Jr.; J. Smith; T. Taylor	3:57
17.	"Two Pistols" (featuring Mitchy Slick)	M. Jones; O. Jackson, Jr.; C. Mitchell; J. Smith	3:28
18.	"Outro"	M. Jones; O. Jackson, Jr.; J. Smith	1:20
Total length:			50:49

Stones Throw bonus 45
No.	Title	Writer(s)	Length
19.	"Soul 4 Real"	M. Jones; O. Jackson, Jr.; J. Smith	3:37
20.	"Life" (featuring Skinhead Rob)	R. Aston; M. Jones; O. Jackson, Jr.; J. Smith	4:59

Sample credits

- "Best of Times" contains a sample from "Trust Me" as performed by Ace Spectrum.
- "Cheeba Cheeba" contains a sample from "Smokin' Cheeba Cheeba" as performed by Harlem Underground Band, and a sample from "I Found a Way Out" as performed by Bill Cosby.
- "Chittlins & Pepsi" contains a sample from "I Don't Really Care" as performed by L.V. Johnson.
- "Telegram" contains a sample from "The Medal" as performed by Ruth Copeland.
- "Questions" contains a sample from "J.L.T." as performed by T2.
- "Smile" contains a sample from "Look Around" as performed by Stevie Wonder, and a sample from "So Young (And So Innocent)" as performed by The Poets.
- "Get Started" contains a sample from "When the Sun Shines at Midnight" as performed by Starcastle.
- "Interlude One" contains a sample from "New Religion" as performed by Trifle.
- "Pressure" contains a sample from "Pulstar" as performed by Vangelis.
- "True Champs" contains a sample from "You Have Everything" as performed by The Metaphors.
- "Needle in the Haystack" contains a sample from "Bawling for Cash" as performed by Cocoa Tea.
- "Two Pistols" contains a sample from "Everything Is Alright Now" as performed by Chuck Bernard.

== Credits and personnel ==
Credits for In Search of Stoney Jackson adapted from AllMusic and from the album liner notes.

- Strong Arm Steady – primary artist
- Late "Phats Bossalini" Bankoudagba – composer, featured artist
- Donti "Tri-State" Ceruti – composer, featured artist
- Phonte Coleman – composer, featured artist
- DJ Babu – mixing [vocals]
- Egon – coordinator
- Jack "Sick Jacken" Gonzalez – composer, featured artist
- Jason "Planet Asia" Green – composer, featured artist
- Talib "Talib Kweli" Greene – composer, featured artist
- Hecktik – management [Strong Arm Steady]
- Lewis Heriz – art direction
- Kelly Hibbert – mastering
- Brock "Steady" Korsan – management [Strong Arm Steady]
- J. Rocc – A&R, coordinator, scratches [cuts]
- Michael "Oh No" Jackson – composer, featured artist
- Otis "Madlib" Jackson, Jr. – composer, mixing, producer, scratches [cuts]
- Arron "Chace Infinite" Johnson – composer, featured artist
- Marvin "Krondon" Jones – composer, engineer
- Santiago "Fashawn" Leyva – composer, featured artist
- Frederico "Csik" Lopez – engineer
- Charles "Mitchy Slick" Mitchell – composer, featured artist
- Peanut Butter Wolf – executive producer
- Michael "Evidence" Perretta – composer, featured artist
- Byron "Guilty Simpson" Simpson – composer, featured artist
- Damien "Roc C" Smith – composer, featured artist
- Jason "Phil Da Agony" Smith – composer
- Terrance "Montage One" Taylor – composer, featured artist
- David "Roscoe" Williams – composer, featured artist

== Chart positions ==
Chart (2010)	Peak position
U.S. Billboard Heatseekers Albums	29
U.S. Billboard Top R&B/Hip-Hop Albums	88

== Release history ==
Format	Date	Label	Edition	Catalog	Ref.
LP, CD, digital download	January 26, 2010	Stones Throw Records	Standard	STH2235	
LP, digital download	March 23, 2010	Stones Throw Records	Instrumentals	STH2242	
