= Eardrum (album) =

Studio album by Talib Kweli
- Released: August 21, 2007
- Recorded: 2006–2007
- Genre: Hip-hop
- Label: Blacksmith; Warner Bros.
- Producer: Adam Deitch; A Kid Called Roots; Battlecat; Chad Beatz; DJ Khalil; E. Jones; Eric Krasno; Hi-Tek; Just Blaze; Kanye West; Karriem Riggins; Kwamé; Madlib; Midi Mafia; Nick Speed; Pete Rock; Sa-Ra; Sha-La Shakier; Swiff D; Terrace Martin; will.i.am

Talib Kweli chronology
The Beautiful Struggle (2004)	Eardrum (2007)	Revolutions per Minute (2010)

Eardrum is the third studio album by American hip-hop artist Talib Kweli. The album was released on August 21, 2007, by Blacksmith Records and Warner Bros. Records. The album features guest appearances from Res, Jean Grae, UGK, Raheem DeVaughn, Roy Ayers, Kanye West, Norah Jones, Coi Mattison, Lyfe Jennings, will.i.am, Sa-Ra, KRS-One, Musiq Soulchild, Strong Arm Steady, Sizzla, Justin Timberlake and Marsha Ambrosius.

== Reception ==
Professional ratings
Aggregate scores
Source	Rating
Metacritic	73/100
Review scores
Source	Rating
AllMusic	3.5/5 stars
The A.V. Club	A−
Entertainment Weekly	A
Now	5/5 stars
The Observer	3/5 stars
The Phoenix	3/4 stars
Pitchfork Media	7.4/10
PopMatters	8/10 stars
RapReviews	9.5/10 stars
Rolling Stone	3/5 stars

=== Critical response ===
Eardrum scored 73 out of 100 from Metacritic based on "generally favorable reviews". Some than most reviews are average or mixed: Uncut gave it a score of three stars out of five and said, "Kweli, whose wordy rhymes can often read better than they flow, sounds nimble and at ease most of the time." Vibe gave it three stars out of five and said it "lacks cohesiveness." Spin gave it a score of five out of ten and said, "Though Kweli can't change his voice he was born with, he needs to figure out how to make it as compelling as his material." Hot Press gave it an above average review, however, and said, "Kweli's collaborative work has set the bar so high that his solo efforts routinely fail to meet these exalted expectations."

Metacritic, XXL gave it a score of XL (the equivalent of four out of five stars) and said, "Unlike 2004's The Beautiful Struggle, which clumsily juxtaposed grungy backpack beats with basic mainstream medleys, Eardrum is a more sonically cohesive endeavor. Having more fun with the music and ignoring his critics, Talib wants to proves about sometimes, the only one worth listening to is yourself". HipHopDX gave it four stars out of five and said, "There is still room for improvement, but this largely the album from Kweli that everyone has been waiting for." AllHipHop gave it a score of 8.5 out of 10 and said it "still delivers enough solid work to be worth checking out no matter what your expectations." About.com gave it a score of four-and-a-half stars out of five and said, "While it's questionable as to whether Eardrum can hold up against his previous classics, it is without a doubt that this is most certainly Talib Kweli’s most effective release to date." AbsolutePunk gave it a score of 74% and said, "Though highly inconsistent due to its extraordinary number of songs, Eardrum impresses as a whole, making the early cop out absolutely unneeded. Talib Kweli refuses to disappoint". Los Angeles Times gave it a favorable review and said, "Kweli's commanding delivery and the well-executed songs on his sixth album... consistently provide pointed commentary... and masterful production".

=== Commercial performance ===
Eardrum debuted at number 2 on the US Billboard 200, selling 60,000 copies in its first week, marking it as Kweli's highest-debuting album to date. In its second week, the album fell down to number 20, selling 25,000 copies, in total of 85,500 copies in the United States. As of 2013, the album has sold 239,000 copies in United States.

== Track listing ==
No.	Title	Writer(s)	Producer(s)	Length
1.	"Everything Man" (featuring Res)	Talib Kweli Greene; Otis Jackson, Jr.	Madlib	3:16
2.	"NY Weather Report"	Talib Kweli Greene; Nick Speed	Nick Speed	4:35
3.	"Hostile Gospel Pt. 1 (Deliver Us)"	Talib Kweli Greene; Justin Smith; Paul Greedus; Didier Marouani	Just Blaze	5:22
4.	"Say Something" (featuring Jean Grae)	Talib Kweli Green; Jean Grae	will.i.am	3:43
5.	"Country Cousins" (featuring UGK & Raheem DeVaughn)	Talib Kweli Greene; Bernard Freeman; Chad Butler	A Kid Called Roots; Sha-La Shakier	4:31
6.	"Holy Moly"	Talib Kweli Greene	Pete Rock	2:08
7.	"Eat to Live"	Talib Kweli Greene; Tommy Smith; Weldon Irvine	Madlib	3:07
8.	"In the Mood" (featuring Roy Ayers & Kanye West)	Talib Kweli Greene; Kanye West; Brian Potter	Kanye West	3:55
9.	"Soon the New Day" (featuring Norah Jones)	Talib Kweli Greene; Otis Jackson Jr.; Paul Charles; John Mason	Madlib; Eric Krasno	4:02
10.	"Give 'Em Hell" (featuring Coi Mattison & Lyfe Jennings)	Talib Kweli Greene; Terrace Martin; Kevin Gilliam; Coi Mattison; Chester Jennings; Al Green	Terrace Martin; Battlecat	4:27
11.	"More or Less" (featuring Dion)	Talib Kweli Greene; Tony Cottrell; Dion Jenkins	Hi-Tek	4:40
12.	"Stay Around"	Talib Kweli Greene; Peter Phillips; Robert Bell; Ronald Bell; George Brown; Cynthia Huggins; Claydes Charles Smith; Dennis Thomas	Pete Rock	4:15
13.	"Hot Thing" (featuring will.i.am)	Talib Kweli Greene; William Adams; Johnny Watson	will.i.am	3:48
14.	"Space Fruit (Interlude)" (featuring Sa-Ra)	Om'Mas Keith; Shafiq Husayn	Sa-Ra	1:31
15.	"The Perfect Beat" (featuring KRS-One)	Talib Kweli Greene; S. Thornton; Lawrence Parker; Bob Marley	Swiff D; Hi-Tek	3:49
16.	"Oh My Stars" (featuring Musiq Soulchild)	Talib Kweli Greene; Taalib Johnson; Khalil Abdul-Rahman; Amani Fela Greene	DJ Khalil	3:40
17.	"Listen!!!"	Talib Kweli Greene; Kwamé Holland; Fred Williams	Kwamé	3:28
18.	"Go With Us" (featuring Strong Arm Steady)	Talib Kweli Greene; Eric Jones; Jason Smith; Marvin Jones; Charles Mitchell	E. Jones	3:59
19.	"Hostile Gospel Pt. 2 (Deliver Me)" (featuring Sizzla)	Talib Kweli Greene; Miguel Collins; Khalil Abdul-Rahman; David Hinds	DJ Khalil	4:21
20.	"The Nature" (featuring Justin Timberlake)	Talib Kweli Greene; William Adams; Justin Timberlake	Eric Krasno; Adam Deitch	5:01

Bonus tracks
No.	Title	Writer(s)	Producer(s)	Length
21.	"Hush" (featuring Jean Grae)	Talib Kweli Greene; Chad Burnette; Michael Clervoix	Chad Beatz	3:55
22.	"Take It Back" (featuring Marsha Ambrosius)	Talib Kweli Greene; Marsha Ambrosius	Karriem Riggins	5:14
23.	"Getting My Grown Man On" (featuring Little Brother)	Talib Kweli Greene; Little Brother	Midi Mafia	3:50

== Charts ==
=== Weekly charts ===
Chart (2007)	Peak position
Canadian Albums (Nielsen SoundScan)	23
Swiss Albums (Schweizer Hitparade)	34
UK Albums (OCC)	82
UK R&B Albums (OCC)	5
US Billboard 200	2
US Top R&B/Hip-Hop Albums (Billboard)	2

=== Year-end charts ===
Chart (2007)	Position
US Top R&B/Hip-Hop Albums (Billboard)	93
