= Fontana Distribution =

US music distributor

- Industry: Music & entertainment
- Genre: Various
- Predecessor: Island Trading Co.; Independent Label Sales
- Founded: 1980; 46 years ago (as Island Trading Co.); 1989; 37 years ago (as Independent Label Sales); 2004; 22 years ago (as Fontana Distribution)
- Founder: Island Records
- Defunct: 2020; 6 years ago
- Fate: Folded
- Successor: Virgin Music (2020–2023); Virgin Music Group (2023–present)
- Headquarters: San Francisco, California, United States
- Services: Distribution, production, warehousing, marketing, sales, brand partnerships, merchandising, finance, back office
- Parent: Universal Music Group
- Divisions: Fontana Distribution; Fontana Label Services; Fontana International

Fontana Distribution was a division of San Francisco–based Isolation Network (now owned by the Virgin Music Group unit of the Universal Music Group since 2019). A minority stake of the company was owned by Universal Music until Ingrooves acquired Fontana Distribution from UMG in 2012 to form Ingrooves Fontana.

In 2019, Universal Music Group acquired Fontana's owner, Ingrooves, returning Fontana back to UMG. A year later, Fontana Distribution was folded into Caroline Distribution, acquired in 2013 via Universal's purchase of EMI, which, another year later, was rebranded as Virgin Music Label & Artist Services.

== Profile ==
Fontana deals in distribution, as well as in a range of sales, marketing, and back office support services, for a diverse roster of independent record labels and their artists. The company takes its name and logo from the Fontana Records label; it was initially launched by Universal Music Group in 2004 and later sold to Isolation Network in 2012. The company includes a UK-based operation, Fontana International, which handles territories outside of North America. The company also had a joint venture in Canada with Cadence Music Group known as Fontana North. The company is the successor of PolyGram's Independent Label Sales (ILS), previously known as Island Trading Co., which folded after the 1999 merger of the MCA and PolyGram families of labels that created Universal Music Group.

Fontana Distribution was known to successfully round up albums worldwide from national Universal Music Group companies for American release or for distribution into further territories. Fontana Distribution also partners with Executive Music Group, Chicago Independent Distribution, and Twenty Two Music Group Distribution, which in turn distribute other independent labels.

During the acquisition of EMI (including EMI Music Distribution), Universal Music Group decided to retain Caroline Distribution and later sold Fontana Distribution to Isolation Network.

After the re-acquisition of Ingrooves by Universal, Fontana was folded into Caroline, which was renamed Virgin Music Label & Artist Services in 2021.

== Fontana Distribution-affiliated labels ==
Fontana Distribution is affiliated with more than 30 labels, including the following:

- ATP Records
- ATO Records
- Angeles Records
- Arsenal Records
- Bridge 9 Records
- Black Diamond Record Companies-IHP Media Groups Music Systems
- Cadence Recordings
- Cement Shoes Records
- Constellation Records
- Century Media
- Delicious Vinyl
- Dangerbird Records
- Dischord Records
- Downtown Records (select releases)
- ECMD Film & Music Distribution
- Element 9
- Eleven Seven Music
- Epitaph Records
- Emanon Records
- Extreme Music
- Ferret Music
- Famous Records
- Fat Wreck Chords
- Fat Possum Records
- Fontana Records
- Global Underground
- Hatchet House
- Hoo-Bangin' Records
- Hopeless Records
- InVogue Records
- Ipecac Recordings
- Kung Fu Records
- Little Idiot
- Mad Science Recordings
- Ministry of Sound
- Mpire Music Group
- Matador Records
- Mancini Entertainment Group
- MySpace Records
- Metal Blade Records
- No Sleep Records
- Napalm Records
- Nuclear Blast
- Nitro Records
- Pocket Kid Records
- Prosthetic Records
- Pure Noise Records
- Pipe Dreams Records
- Psycho+Logical-Records
- Psychopathic Records
- Real Talk Entertainment
- Relativity Music Group
- Rap-A-Lot Records
- Rostrum Records
- Rise Records
- SideOneDummy Records
- Solid State Records
- Sumerian Records
- StandBy Records
- Strange Music
- SMC Recordings
- SoBe Entertainment
- SoSouth
- Telarc Records
- Trustkill Records
- Tooth & Nail Records
- Trill Entertainment
- TortureSquad Inc.
- Twenty Two Recordings
- URBNET Records
- VP Records
- Vagrant Records
- Van Richter Records
- WaterTower Music
- Wichita Recordings (select releases)
- Warcon Enterprises

== Divisions ==
- Fontana Distribution
- Fontana Label Services
- Fontana International

== See also ==
- Fontana North
