= Blacksmith Records =

Music management company and record label

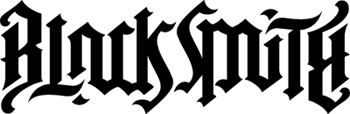
- Parent company: Fontana
- Founded: 2005
- Founder: Talib Kweli, Corey Smyth
- Distributor: Element 9/Fontana (US)
- Genre: Hip-hop, R&B
- Country of origin: US
- Official website: blacksmithnyc.com

Blacksmith is a music management company and record label founded by Harlem-born Corey Smyth and Talib Kweli of Black Star in 2005.

Signees include Jean Grae, Strong Arm Steady, Vince Staples and Idle Warship. Kweli has stated he hopes to sign Camp Lo and had expressed interest in signing Rakim as well.

The label was originally distributed through Warner Bros. Records but split in December 2008. As of 2012, the label is defunct and was disbanded after Kweli's manager decided to focus the Blacksmith brand elsewhere as a Management company rather than a label. As of 2024, Blacksmith Management is home to artists such as Chad Hugo and Vince Staples.

== Artists ==
=== Rappers/singers ===
- Talib Kweli (2005– 2012)
- Jean Grae (2005–present)
- Anjulie
- Vince Staples (2013–present)
- Kilo Kish
- Ameer Vann (ca. 2020-present)

=== Producers ===
- Hi-Tek

=== Groups ===
- Strong Arm Steady (2011–present)
  - Krondon
  - Mitchy Slick
  - Phil da Agony
- Idle Warship
  - Talib Kweli
  - Res

== Releases ==
- 2007: Talib Kweli and Madlib - Liberation
- 2007: Talib Kweli - Eardrum
- 2008: Jean Grae and 9th Wonder - Jeanius
- 2009: Idle Warship - Party Robot
- 2010: Reflection Eternal - Revolutions Per Minute
- 2011: Talib Kweli - Gutter Rainbows
- 2011: Strong Arm Steady - Arms & Hammers
- 2015: Vince Staples - Summertime '06
- 2017: Vince Staples - Big Fish Theory
- 2024: Vince Staples - Dark Times

== See also ==
- List of record labels
- Ambigram
