= Strong Arm Steady =

American hip-hop group

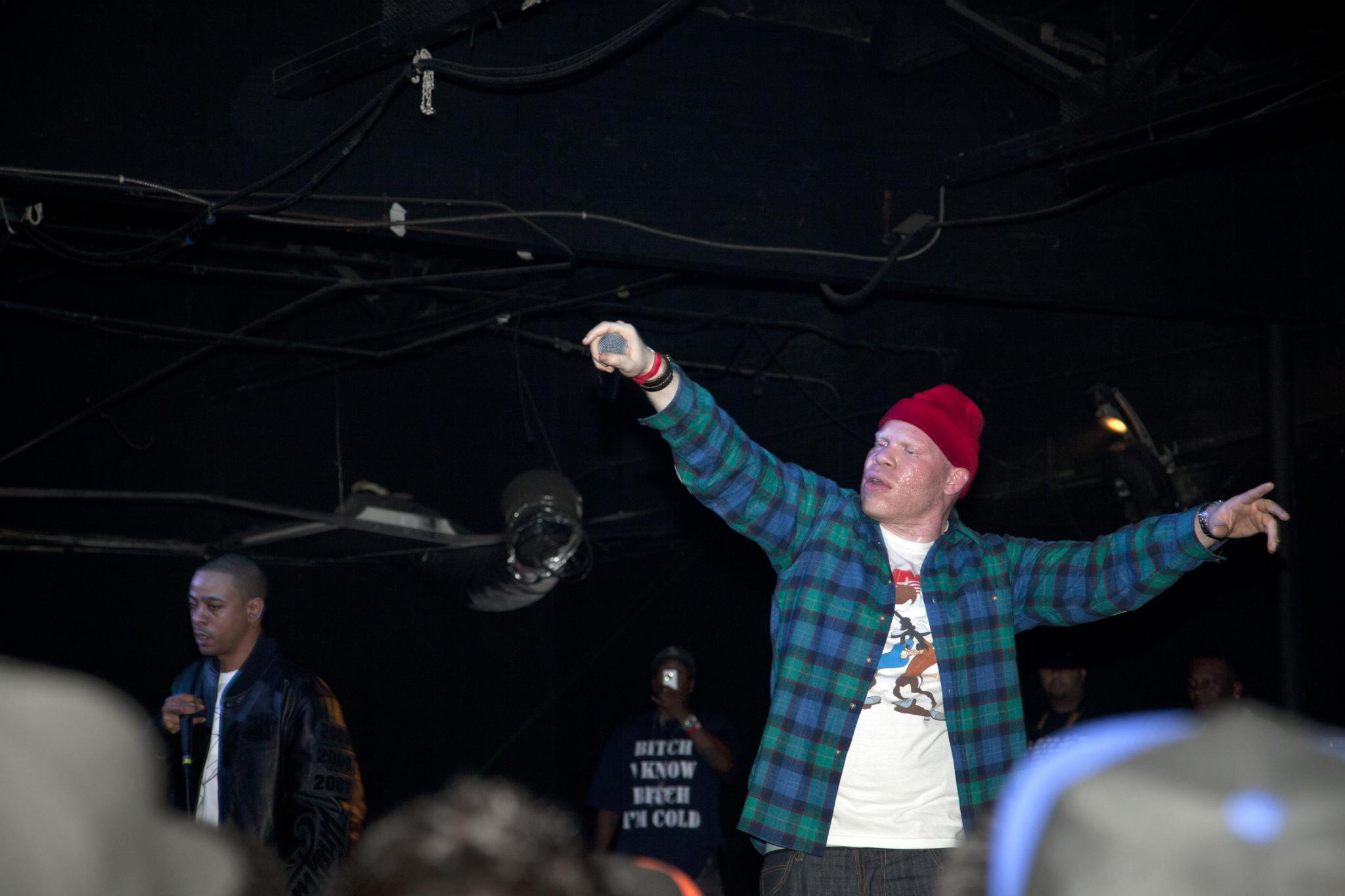
- Live in 2010

Background information
- Origin: California
- Genres: Hip-hop; underground hip-hop; West Coast hip-hop
- Years active: 2003–present
- Labels: Nature Sounds; Stones Throw; Blacksmith; Element 9; Warner
- Members: Mitchy Slick; Phil Da Agony; Krondon
- Past members: Xzibit; Planet Asia; Chace Infinite; DJ Khalil; DJ Truly OdD

Strong Arm Steady, often referred to as SAS, is a hip-hop group in California's underground hip-hop scene. As of December 2009, the act consists of members Phil Da Agony, Krondon, of Los Angeles, and Mitchy Slick of San Diego, California. Originally an amorphous collective of at least eight, formed as an alternative to the gang-focused productions of West Coast hip-hop's then-dominant Death Row Records, SAS pared down to four members for recording in the studio and performing live, with Xzibit as the frontman. Since he left the group in 2006, the three remaining members have been a stable trio.

Over the years, they have recorded many mixtapes and have distributed them all over the world. "Speaking directly to their fans," they were West Coast pioneers in the use of mixtapes as a group's principal method of distribution and marketing, a model necessitated by their neither being DJs nor closely affiliated with a DJ, and a method already proven on the East Coast by 50 Cent and others in the early 2000s.

== Music ==
Talib Kweli signed Strong Arm Steady to his Blacksmith Records label in 2007. The group released a collaboration with producer Madlib, In Search of Stoney Jackson, with a roster of guest vocalists including studio head Talib Kweli, former SAS member Planet Asia, Guilty Simpson, Phonte (of Little Brother), Fashawn, and "a host of underground Los Angeles's emerging rap talent." Stoney Jackson, as it has been called for short, was released online as MP3 files in December 2009 through Stones Throw Records, with a CD release date of January 26, 2010. The album was named one of the best albums of 2010 by numerous media outlets including AllHipHop and on the blog of famed producer DJ Premier.

Their album Arms & Hammers was released on February 22, 2011 by Blacksmith Records and Element 9 and distributed by Fontana Distribution. In 2012, they released a collaboration album with Statik Selektah, titled Stereo Type.

== Discography ==
=== Studio albums ===
- 2007: Deep Hearted
- 2010: In Search of Stoney Jackson
- 2011: Arms & Hammers
- 2012: Stereo Type (with Statik Selektah)

=== Extended plays ===
- 2012: Members Only
- 2012: Stereo Type (with Statik Selektah)
- 2012: Stereo Jr (with Oh No)

=== Official mixtapes ===
- 2003: The Collectors Edition Vol.1: The Best of Mixtapes, Exclusives & Freestyles
- 2003: D-Bo Series Vol.1
- 2003: D-Bo Series Vol.2
- 2003: Gangs of L.A.
- 2004: L.A. Ballin' 2004: All-Star Edition
- 2006: O-Dog Series Vol.1
- 2006: Green Up
- 2006: Strong Arm Radio: Klack Music - Blacksmith Edition
- 2007: Dilated Steady: 20:20 Official Mixtape (with Dilated Peoples)
- 2008: Deep Hearted: The Sampler Mixtape
- 2008: Cali Untouchable Radio 17: Klak Klak Edition
- 2009: Gang Mentality
- 2013: 2 Many Other Niggas to Name

=== Singles ===
- One Step (2007)
- Can't Let It Go (2010)
- Trunk Music (2010)
- Make Me Feel (2011)
- On Point feat. Too Short (2011)
- Hand Guns feat. Jelly-Roll (2011)
