= Res (singer) =

American singer-songwriter

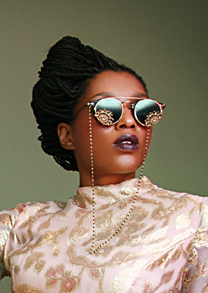
- Res, in 2011

Background information
- Born: Shareese Renée Ballard October 14, 1977 (age 48)
- Origin: Philadelphia, Pennsylvania, U.S.
- Genres: Alternative R&B; rock
- Occupations: Singer; songwriter; musician
- Instrument: Vocals
- Years active: 1999–present
- Labels: MCA; Javotti Media; eOne
- Formerly of: Idle Warship
- Website: the1res.com

Shareese Renée Ballard (born October 14, 1977), known professionally as Res (/riːs/ REESS), is an American singer, songwriter and musician from Philadelphia, Pennsylvania.

== Career ==
=== Solo career ===
Res released her debut album, How I Do, in 2001 along with its first single "Golden Boys." Despite heavy rotation on VH1, the song did not catch on in radio play. "Ice King" (Remixed by Nas) emerged as the second single later that year but also failed to break through with radio audiences and no video was filmed. In early 2002, Res released the third single from How I Do, "They-Say Vision." The song and accompanying video were breakthrough hits and reached #1 on the Billboard Dance chart and #37 on the Hot 100 Singles Sales chart. With the chart success of the single, the album entered the Billboard 200 for the first time. A fourth single, "Sittin' Back," was also released but did not enjoy the same success as "They-Say Vision."

Meanwhile, in 2002, Res appeared on a track with Tony Allen, Ray Lema, Baaba Maal, Positive Black Soul and Archie Shepp for the Red Hot Organization's compilation album Red Hot and Riot, a tribute to Nigerian musician Fela Kuti. Res also performed a cover of Jefferson Starship song, "Miracles" for the Jennifer Lopez movie Maid in Manhattan.

In 2003, her record label, MCA Records, was phased out by MCA Inc. and absorbed by Geffen Records. Res was later released from her contract at her request after the label refused to release any further work despite paying her contracted label salary. After parting ways with Geffen, Res was called upon to model for Marc Ecko's "Ecko Red" clothing line and appeared in print advertising.

In 2006, Res recorded "To Empower" for the soundtrack of the drama film Akeelah and the Bee. She joined Gnarls Barkley's St. Elsewhere tour providing supporting vocals while writing and recording material for her second album.

In 2009, Res released her second album Black.Girls.Rock! through digital media available on iTunes. The album features tracks originally recorded for her shelved Geffen album. Black.Girls.Rock! is described by Res as "more of a singer/songwriters album than my debut. Great, classic songs!" Res funded a limited production run of vinyl pressings.

On February 14, 2011, Res released a compilation of unreleased demos and remixed songs titled A Box of Chocolates after the Forrest Gump quote. The digital-only album is mixed by DJ NI** Sky (Nicole Albino of Nina Sky) and features a blend of music from multiple genres of music. The album was intended as a Valentine's Day gift to her fans as they awaited a proper release of Black.Girls.Rock!.

In 2013, Res signed with Javotti Media/EOne Records and her third studio album, 'Reset', was scheduled to be released on September 15, 2016. As of June 2018, the album had not been released, but an Indigogo campaign for the album had raised $39,000.

=== Idle Warship ===
In 2009, Res joined long-time collaborator and emcee Talib Kweli to form a hip-hop/electro duo known as Idle Warship. They released a few teaser tracks online including a song named "Steady", that borrows from "Sunglasses At Night" by Corey Hart. In June 2009, Idle Warship completed their first headlining tour through Europe. They performed to sold-out crowds in Switzerland, Norway, France and Germany. Idle Warship has produced a mixtape called Party Robots made available for download in October 2010 on Res' official site.

Their debut album, Habits of the Heart, was released on November 1, 2011. The first single from this debut, "Laser Beams", was produced by DJ Khalil and The New Royales.

== Musical style ==
Her musical style is a blend of indie pop, soul, and rock.

== Discography ==
=== Albums ===
==== Studio albums ====
- How I Do (2001)
- Black.Girls.Rock! (2009)
- How I Do (RESET) (2024)

==== Collaboration albums ====
- Habits of the Heart (with Talib Kweli as Idle Warship) (2011)

==== Compilation albums ====
- Party Robots Mixtape (with Talib Kweli as Idle Warship) (2010)
- A Box of Chocolates (2011)

==== Extended plays ====
- ReFried Mac (2013)

== See also ==
- List of number-one dance hits (United States)
- List of artists who reached number one on the US Dance chart
