= List of songs recorded by Yasiin Bey =

The following is a list of songs by Yasiin Bey (formerly known as Mos Def) organized by alphabetical order. The songs on the list are all included in official label-released albums, soundtracks and singles, but not white label or other non-label releases. As of August 30, 2009, Mos Def had released 158 songs.

Contents:	Top – 0-9 A B C D E F G H I J K L M N O P Q R S T U W Y Z See also

== A ==
1. "Another World" – Mos Def – We Are Hip-Hop, Me, You, Everybody (Disc 4)
2. "A Ha" – Mos Def – True Magic
3. "All My People (The Body Rock Party Break Remixed by Dr. Luke)" – Mos Def – We Are Hip-Hop, Me, You, Everybody (Disc 2)
4. "All Praises Due (A.D.L.I.B.)" – Mos Def – We Are Hip-Hop, Me, You, Everybody (Disc 3)
5. "Another World (Ambivalence Remix)" – Mos Def – We Are Hip-Hop, Me, You, Everybody (Disc 2)
6. "Another World" – Black Star – We Are Hip-Hop, Me, You, Everybody (Disc 1)
7. "Another World (Remix)" – Mos Def – We Are Hip-Hop, Me, You, Everybody (Disc 3)
8. "Astronomy (8th Light)" – Black Star – Black Star
9. "Auditorium (featuring Slick Rick)" – Mos Def – The Ecstatic

== B ==
1. "B Boys Will B Boys" – Black Star – Black Star
2. "B.M.T." (featuring Biz & Towa Tei) – Mos Def – We Are Hip-Hop, Me, You, Everybody (Disc 2)
3. "B-Boy Document '99" (with High & Mighty & Skillz) – Mos Def – Soundbombing 2
4. "Beautiful" (Remix – Mary J. Blige) – Mos Def – We Are Hip-Hop, Me, You, Everybody (Disc 2)
5. "Bedstuy Parade & Funeral March" (featuring Paul Oscher) – Mos Def – The New Danger
6. "Beef" – Mos Def – Mos Definite
7. "The Beggar" – Mos Def – The New Danger
8. "Big Brother Beat" – Mos Def – We Are Hip-Hop, Me, You, Everybody (Disc 4)
9. "Bin Laden" (featuring Mos Def & Eminem) – Immortal Technique – single
10. "Blade in the Pocket" – Dec 99th – December 99th
11. "Blue Black Jack" (featuring Shuggie Otis) – Mos Def – The New Danger
12. "Body Rock" (with Q-Tip & Tash) – Mos Def
13. "Boogie Man Song" – Mos Def – The New Danger
14. "A Brighter Day (with Ronnie Jordan)" – Mos Def – We Are Hip-Hop, Me, You, Everybody (Disc 1)
15. "Brooklyn" – Mos Def – Black On Both Sides
16. "Brown Skin Lady" – Black Star – Black Star
17. "Bullshittin' (with N'Dea Davenport)" – Mos Def – We Are Hip-Hop, Me, You, Everybody (Disc 2)
18. "Brown Sugar (Extra Sweet)" – Mos Def – Faith Evans – Brown Sugar Soundtrack – 2001

== C ==
1. "Caldonia" – Mos Def – Lackawanna Blues (Broadway play)
2. "Can U See The Pride In The Panthere" – Mos Def – The Dangerous Mix
3. "Casa Bey" – Mos Def – The Ecstatic
4. "Champion Requiem" – Mos Def – The New Danger
5. "Children's Story" – Black Star – Black Star
6. "Climb (featuring Vinia Mojica)" – Mos Def – Black On Both Sides
7. "Close Edge" – Mos Def – The New Danger
8. "Crime & Medicine" – Mos Def – True Magic
9. "Crosstown Beef" – Mos Def and DCQ – Soundbombing II
10. "Crying At Airports (Whale)" – Mos Def – We Are Hip-Hop, Me, You, Everybody (Disc 3)

== D ==
1. "Damascus" (featuring Omar Souleyman & Mos Def) – Gorillaz – The Mountain
2. "Dead Certainty" – Mos Def – We Are Hip-Hop, Me, You, Everybody (Disc 4)
3. "Dec 99th" – Dec 99th – single
4. "Destination Love" – Mos Def – Lackawanna Blues (Broadway play)
5. "Definition" – Black Star – Black Star
6. "Do It Now (featuring Busta Rhymes)" – Mos Def – Black On Both Sides
7. "Do Your Best (featuring Mos Def)" – Femi Kuti – Fight To Win
8. "Dollar Day" (released on Audio 3 as "Katrina Clap") – Mos Def – True Magic
9. "Double Trouble (with The Roots)" – Mos Def – We Are Hip-Hop, Me, You, Everybody (Disc 1)
10. "Drunk And Hot Girls (featuring Mos Def)" – Kanye West – Graduation

== E ==
1. "The Easy Spell" – Mos Def – The New Danger
2. "The Embassy" – Mos Def – The Ecstatic
3. "Excellence" – Mos Def – Mos Definite

== F ==
1. "Fake Bonanza" – Mos Def – True Magic
2. "Fear Not Of Man" – Mos Def – Black On Both Sides
3. "Fix Up" – Blackstar – Black Star
4. "Foundation (featuring DJ Honda)"– Mos Def – The Dangerous Mix
5. "Freak Daddy" – Mos Def – Soundbombing III
6. "Freaky Black Greetings" – Mos Def – The New Danger
7. "Free Flowin' (featuring Talib Kweli)" – Mos Def – Mos Definite
8. "Freestyle (with Tony Touch)" – Mos Def – We Are Hip-Hop, Me, You, Everybody (Disc 2)
9. "Freequency" – Black Star – No Fear of Time

== G ==
1. "Ghetto Rock" – Mos Def – The New Danger
2. "Got" – Mos Def – Black On Both Sides
3. "Grown Man Business (Fresh Vintage Bottles)" [featuring Minnesota] – Mos Def – The New Danger

== H ==
1. "Habitat" – Mos Def – Black On Both Sides
2. "Hard Margin (featuring Talib Kweli)" – Mos Def – Mos Definite
3. "The Hard Margin (The Creators)" – Mos Def – We Are Hip-Hop, Me, You, Everybody (Disc 1)
4. "Hater Players" – Black Star – Black Star
5. "Heri" – Dec 99th – December 99th
6. "High Drama" – Mos Def – We Are Hip-Hop, Me, You, Everybody (Disc 4)
7. "High Drama (Remix) [with Mike Zoot and Shawn J. Period]" – Mos Def – We Are Hip-Hop, Me, You, Everybody (Disc 3)
8. "Hip-Hop" – Mos Def – Black On Both Sides
9. "History (featuring Talib Kweli)" – Mos Def – The Ecstatic
10. "Hurricane" – Mos Def – We Are Hip-Hop, Me, You, Everybody (Disc 1)
11. "HYMN" – Dec 99th – single

== I ==
1. "I Against I" – Massive Attack ft. Mos Def – The Dangerous Mix / Blade II (soundtrack)
2. "If You Can Huh ..." – Mos Def – Soundbombing
3. "Intro" – Black Star – Black Star
4. "Intro" – Mos Def – We Are Hip-Hop, Me, You, Everybody (Disc 4)
5. "In My Math" – Mos Def – Mos Dub (mixtape)
6. "I've Committed Murder (with Macy Gray)" – Mos Def – We Are Hip-Hop, Me, You, Everybody (Disc 2)
7. "I've Committed Murder (featuring Guru)" – Mos Def – Mos Definite

== J ==
1. "Jam On It" – Mos Def – The Dangerous Mix
2. "Jump Off (featuring Ludacris) [UK Bonus Track]" – Mos Def – The New Danger

== K ==
1. "Kalifornia" – Mos Def – The Dangerous Mix
2. "K.O.S. (Determination)" – Black Star – Black Star
3. "Know That (featuring Talib Kweli)" – Mos Def – Black On Both Sides

== L ==
1. "Life In Marvelous Times" – Mos Def – The Ecstatic
2. "Life Is Real" – Mos Def – The New Danger
3. "Lifetime" – Mos Def – True Magic
4. "Life is Good" -Mos Def – single
5. "Light (Can You See It) [with DJ Krush]" – Mos Def – We Are Hip-Hop, Me, You, Everybody (Disc 2)
6. "Little Brother (Black Star)" – Mos Def – We Are Hip-Hop, Me, You, Everybody (Disc 2)
7. "Local Time" – Dec 99th – single, December 99th
8. "Love" – Mos Def – Black On Both Sides
9. "Love Rain (Remix) [with Jill Scott]" – Mos Def – We Are Hip-Hop, Me, You, Everybody (Disc 3)
10. "Love Song (featuring Bush Babies & De La Soul) – Mos Def – The Dangerous Mix
11. "The Love Song (Bush Babies)" – Mos Def – We Are Hip-Hop, Me, You, Everybody (Disc 3)
12. "The Love Song (Remix f/De La)" – Mos Def – We Are Hip-Hop, Me, You, Everybody (Disc 2)
13. "Lyrical Fluctuation 2000" – Mos Def – We Are Hip-Hop, Me, You, Everybody (Disc 3)

== M ==
1. "Magnetic Arts (featuring Mos Def) – DJ Honda
2. "Magnificent" – Mos Def – The Dangerous Mix
3. "The Main Thing Is to Keep the Main Thing the Main Thing" – Black Star – No Fear of Time
4. "Make It All Better (featuring Talib Kweli)" – Mos Def – Mos Definite
5. "Make It Better" – Mos Def – We Are Hip-Hop, Me, You, Everybody (Disc 4)
6. "Manifest Destiny (UTD)" – Mos Def – We Are Hip-Hop, Me, You, Everybody (Disc 2)
7. "Mathematics" – Mos Def – Black On Both Sides
8. "May–December" – Mos Def – Black On Both Sides
9. "Mineral Mountain" (featuring Black Thought) – Black Star – single
10. "Modern Marvel" – Mos Def – The New Danger
11. "Monster Music (featuring Cassidy)" – Mos Def – Mos Definite
12. "Moon In Cancer" – Mos Def – We Are Hip-Hop, Me, You, Everybody (Disc 4)
13. "Most Def (Brixx)" – Mos Def – We Are Hip-Hop, Me, You, Everybody (Disc 1)
14. "Mr. Nigga (featuring Q-Tip" – Mos Def – Black On Both Sides
15. "Ms. Fat Booty" – Mos Def – Black On Both Sides
16. "Murder Of A Teenage Life" – Mos Def – True Magic
17. "My Favorite Band" – Yasiin Bey – No Fear of Time
18. "My Kung-Fu (UTD)" – Mos Def – We Are Hip-Hop, Me, You, Everybody (Disc 1)
19. "My Kung-Fu (UTD) [Remix]" – Mos Def – We Are Hip-Hop, Me, You, Everybody (Disc 3)

== N ==
1. "N.A.W." – Dec 99th – single
2. "Napoleon Dynamite" – Mos Def – True Magic
3. "New World Water" – Mos Def – Black On Both Sides
4. "Next Universe" – Mos Def – We Are Hip-Hop, Me, You, Everybody (Disc 1)
5. "No Hay Nada Mas" – Mos Def – The Ecstatic
6. "Non Stop" – Mos Def – Mos Definite

== O ==
1. "o.G." – Black Star – No Fear of Time
2. "Oh No (with Pharoahe Monch & Nate Dogg)" – Mos Def – Lyricist Lounge 2
3. "One Four Love (Part 1) [with Common, Kool G Rap, Pharoahe Monch, Posdnuos, Rah Digga, Shabaam Sahdeeq, Sporty Thievz, Talib Kweli]" – Mos Def – Hip-Hop For Respect
4. "One Four Love (Part 2) [with Cappadonna, Channel Live, Crunch Lo, Shyheim, Wise Intelligent]" – Mos Def – Hip-Hop For Respect
5. "Outro" – Mos Def – Mos Definite

== P ==
1. "The Panties" – Mos Def – The New Danger
2. "Perfect Timing" – Mos Def – True Magic
3. "Pistola" – Mos Def – The Ecstatic
4. "Pornographic" – Mos Def – Mos Definite
5. "Prayer Song (featuring K'naan)" – Mos Def
6. "Pretty Dancer" – Mos Def – The Ecstatic
7. "Priority" – Mos Def – The Ecstatic

== Q ==
1. "The Questions" (Common) – Mos Def – We Are Hip-Hop, Me, You, Everybody (Disc 3)
2. "Quiet Dog Bite Hard" – Mos Def – The Ecstatic

== R ==
1. "The Rape Over" – Mos Def – The New Danger
2. "RE: DEFinition" – Black Star – Black Star
3. "Respiration (featuring Common)" – Black Star – Black Star
4. "Respiration (Dr. Luke Remix) [featuring Common]" – Mos Def – We Are Hip-Hop, Me, You, Everybody (Disc 4)
5. "Revelation" – Mos Def – The Ecstatic
6. "Rock 'N' Roll" – Mos Def – Black On Both Sides
7. "Rock, Rock Y'all (with A Tribe Called Quest)" – Mos Def – We Are Hip-Hop, Me, You, Everybody (Disc 3)
8. "Roses (featuring Georgia Anne Muldrow)" – Mos Def – The Ecstatic

== S ==
1. "S.O.S. (with Bush Babies)" – Mos Def – We Are Hip-Hop, Me, You, Everybody (Disc 1)
2. "Saturday Night" – Mos Def – We Are Hip-Hop, Me, You, Everybody (Disc 2)
3. "Seaside Panic Room" – Dec 99th – December 99th
4. "Service" – Mos Def [with Mike Zoot] – single
5. "Sex, Love & Money" – Mos Def – The New Danger
6. "Shadow in the Dark" – Dec 99th – December 99th
7. "Shinjiro (with DJ Krush)" – Mos Def – We Are Hip-Hop, Me, You, Everybody (Disc 3)
8. "Side B Freestyle (Soundbombing)" – Mos Def – We Are Hip-Hop, Me, You, Everybody (Disc 3)
9. "Six Days (feat. DJ Shadow) – Mos Def – The Dangerous Mix
10. "Smith 'N' Slappy (with Scritti Politti)" – Mos Def – We Are Hip-Hop, Me, You, Everybody (Disc 3)
11. "So Be It" – Black Star – No Fear of Time
12. "A Soldier's Dream" – Mos Def – We Are Hip-Hop, Me, You, Everybody (Disc 1)
13. "Special Dedication" – Dec 99th – December 99th
14. "Speed Law" – Mos Def – Black On Both Sides
15. "Stakes Is High (Remix) [with De La Soul]" – Mos Def – We Are Hip-Hop, Me, You, Everybody (Disc 1)
16. "Stylo" (featuring Mos Def & Bobby Womack) – Gorillaz – Plastic Beach
17. "Summertime" – Mos Def – Mos Definite
18. "Sun, Moon, Stars" – Mos Def – True Magic
19. "Sunshine" – Mos Def – The New Danger
20. "Supermagic" – Mos Def – The Ecstatic
21. "Sweepstakes" (featuring Mos Def & Hypnotic Brass Ensemble) – Gorillaz – Plastic Beach

== T ==
1. "Tall Sleeves" – Dec 99th – single, December 99th
2. "There Is A Way" – Mos Def – True Magic
3. "Thieves In The Night" – Black Star – Black Star
4. "Thug Is A Drug" – Mos Def – True Magic
5. "Tinseltown To The Boogiedown (Ali Shaheed Remix)" – Mos Def – We Are Hip-Hop, Me, You, Everybody (Disc 3)
6. "Tinseltown To The Boogiedown (Beatnuts Remix)" – Mos Def – We Are Hip-Hop, Me, You, Everybody (Disc 1)
7. "Tinseltown To The Boogiedown (Pete Rock Remix)" – Mos Def – We Are Hip-Hop, Me, You, Everybody (Disc 2)
8. "Tinseltown To The Boogiedown (Rob Swift Variation" – Mos Def – We Are Hip-Hop, Me, You, Everybody (Disc 4)
9. "Tinseltown To The Boogiedown (with Scritti Politti)" – Mos Def – We Are Hip-Hop, Me, You, Everybody (Disc 2)
10. "Travellin' Man (featuring Mos Def)" – DJ Honda – h II
11. "A Tree Never Grown" – Mos Def – We Are Hip-Hop, Me, You, Everybody (Disc 4)
12. "True Magic" – Mos Def – True Magic
13. "Twice Inna Lifetime" – Black Star – Black Star
14. "Twilite Speedball" – Mos Def – The Ecstatic
15. "Tournament" – Mos Def – <Unreleased>

== U ==
1. "U R The One" – Mos Def – True Magic
2. "Umi Says" – Mos Def – Black On Both Sides, single
3. "Undeniable" – Mos Def – True Magic
4. "Universal Magnetic" – Mos Def – Soundbombing

== V ==
1. "Very Well" – Mos Def – <Unreleased>

== W ==
1. "War" – Mos Def – The New Danger
2. "Wahid" – Mos Def – The Ecstatic
3. "What's That" – Mos Def – Mos Definite
4. "Whats That (Que Eso?)" – Mos Def – We Are Hip-Hop, Me, You, Everybody (Disc 4)
5. "White Drapes" – Mos Def – single
6. "Work It Out" – Mos Def – The Dangerous Mix
7. "Workers Comp." – Mos Def – The Ecstatic
8. "World Famous" – Mos Def – Mos Definite
9. "Wylin' Out (featuring Diverse) – Mos Def – The Dangerous Mix

== Y ==
1. "Yo Yeah" – Black Star – Black Star
2. "Yonders" – Black Star – No Fear of Time
3. "You (Feel Good Remix)" – Mos Def – We Are Hip-Hop, Me, You, Everybody (Disc 4)
4. "You Already Knew" – Black Star – single

== Z ==
1. "Zimzallabim" – Mos Def – The New Danger

== See also ==
- Mos Def discography

== Sources ==
- "Mos Def: The Ecstatic". Downtown Music. Archived from the original on June 24, 2009.
- "Mos Def: The New Danger. Geffen, 2004". Tiny Mix Tapes. 2004. Archived from the original on December 16, 2004.
- "The Week Ahead in New York Music, Nov. 28 to Dec. 4". NBC New York. November 29, 2011.
- "Rock and Pop: Yasiin Bey (Mos Def)". The New Yorker. December 8, 2016. Archived from the original on December 9, 2016.
- Aaron, Charles (May 1998). "Singles". Spin. Vol. 14, no. 5. p. 141 – via Google Books.
- Baker, Soren (March 7, 2014). "50 Cent Leaves Interscope: How Nas, Busta Rhymes, Ghostface Killah & Mos Def Fared After Leaving Their Longtime Label Homes". HipHopDX. Archived from the original on March 11, 2016.
- Chinen, Nate (January 8, 2007). "Critic's Choice: New CDs". The New York Times. Archived from the original on January 24, 2025.
- Crysell, Andy (September 19, 1998). "Blackstar (Rawkus)". NME. Archived from the original on August 17, 2000.
- Dombal, Ryan (January 12, 2007). "True Magic (review)". Entertainment Weekly. Archived from the original on November 22, 2016.
- Ducker, Jesse (June 8, 2024). "Mos Def's 'The Ecstatic' Turns 15 | Album Anniversary". Albumism. Archived from the original on June 8, 2024.
- Ducker, Jesse (June 4, 2022). "Yasiin Bey & Talib Kweli Reconnect Their Lyrical Powers as Black Star on 'No Fear of Time' | Album Review". Albumism. Archived from the original on June 5, 2022.
- Farsides, Tony (July 2000). "Reviews: Singles". Muzik. No. 62. p. 117 – via Internet Archive.
- Fennessey, Sean (January 4, 2007). "Albums: True Magic – Mos Def". Pitchfork. Archived from the original on March 17, 2009.
- Furman, Michael (2007). "Music Reviews: Mos Def – Tru3 Magic". Tiny Mix Tapes. Archived from the original on October 23, 2007.
- Goldman, Andrew (October 12, 1999). "Albums: Black on Both Sides. Mos Def: 1999". Pitchfork. Archived from the original on March 18, 2009.
- Hall, Rashaun (October 30, 2004). Paoletta, Michael (ed.). "Billboard Picks: Albums – R&B/Hip-Hop". Billboard – via Google Books.
- Heaton, Dave (October 27, 2004). "Mos Def: The New Danger". PopMatters. Archived from the original on October 24, 2020.
- Kimble, Julian (January 3, 2017). "Yasiin Bey was one of rap's brightest stars. His farewell concert was a stirring reminder". The Washington Post. Archived from the original on January 4, 2017.
- Kot, Greg (August 13, 2009). "Album review: Mos Def's 'The Ecstatic'". Chicago Tribune. Archived from the original on March 9, 2012.
- Larkin, Colin (2007). The Encyclopedia of Popular Music (5th concise ed.). New York: Omnibus Press and Muze UK. ISBN 978-1-84609-856-7.
- Leight, Elias (August 2, 2016). "Yasiin Bey Preaches Persistence on 'HYMN:' 'Never Stop Pursuing Freedom'". Rolling Stone. Archived from the original on January 29, 2019.
- Lisle, Andria (2004). "Reviews: Mos Def - The New Danger". Paste. Archived from the original on December 20, 2004.
- Moore, Marcus J. (January 2, 2017). "Yasiin Bey: December 99th (review)". Pitchfork. Archived from the original on January 3, 2017.
- Ogg, Alex; Upshal, David (2001). The Hop Hop Years: A History of Rap. New York: Fromm International. ISBN 0-8-806-4-263-7 – via Internet Archive.
- Pemberton, Rollie (October 15, 2004). "Mos Def: The New Danger. Geffen, 2004". Stylus Magazine. Archived from the original on November 10, 2004.
- Peters, Michelle (November 13, 2022). "Black Star Joined by Madlib for 'No Fear of Time' Performances During 'SNL' Debut: Watch". Billboard. Archived from the original on November 13, 2022.
- Powell, Kevin (October 7, 1998). "Album Reviews: Black Star". Rolling Stone. Archived from the original on April 1, 2008.
- Relic, Peter (2004). "Mos Def". In Brackett, Nathan; Hoard, Christian David (eds.). The New Rolling Stone Album Guide: Completely Revised and Updated (4th ed.). New York: Simon & Schuster. ISBN 9780743201698 – via Google Books.
- Samuel, S. (January 13, 2009). "Mos Def Reveals New Album Details, Bringing Back "Def Poetry"". Sounds of Hip Hop. Archived from the original on May 2, 2019.
- Schwartz, Barry (January 9, 2007). "Mos Def: True Magic. Geffen. 2006 (review)". Stylus Magazine. Archived from the original on January 12, 2007.
- Thompson, Paul A. (August 25, 2024). "Albums: Soundbombing II. Various Artists, 1999". Pitchfork. Archived from the original on August 25, 2024.
- Weiss, Dan (April 6, 2012). "Ten Rap-Rock Songs That Are Actually Awesome". LA Weekly. Archived from the original on July 28, 2020.
- Young, Jennifer R. (2010). "Brooklyn Beats: Hip Hop's Home to Everyone from Everywhere". In Hess, Mickey (ed.). Hip Hop in America: A Regional Guide. ABC-Clio. ISBN 9780313343223.
