= Yasiin Bey discography =

Yasiin Bey / Mos Def discography
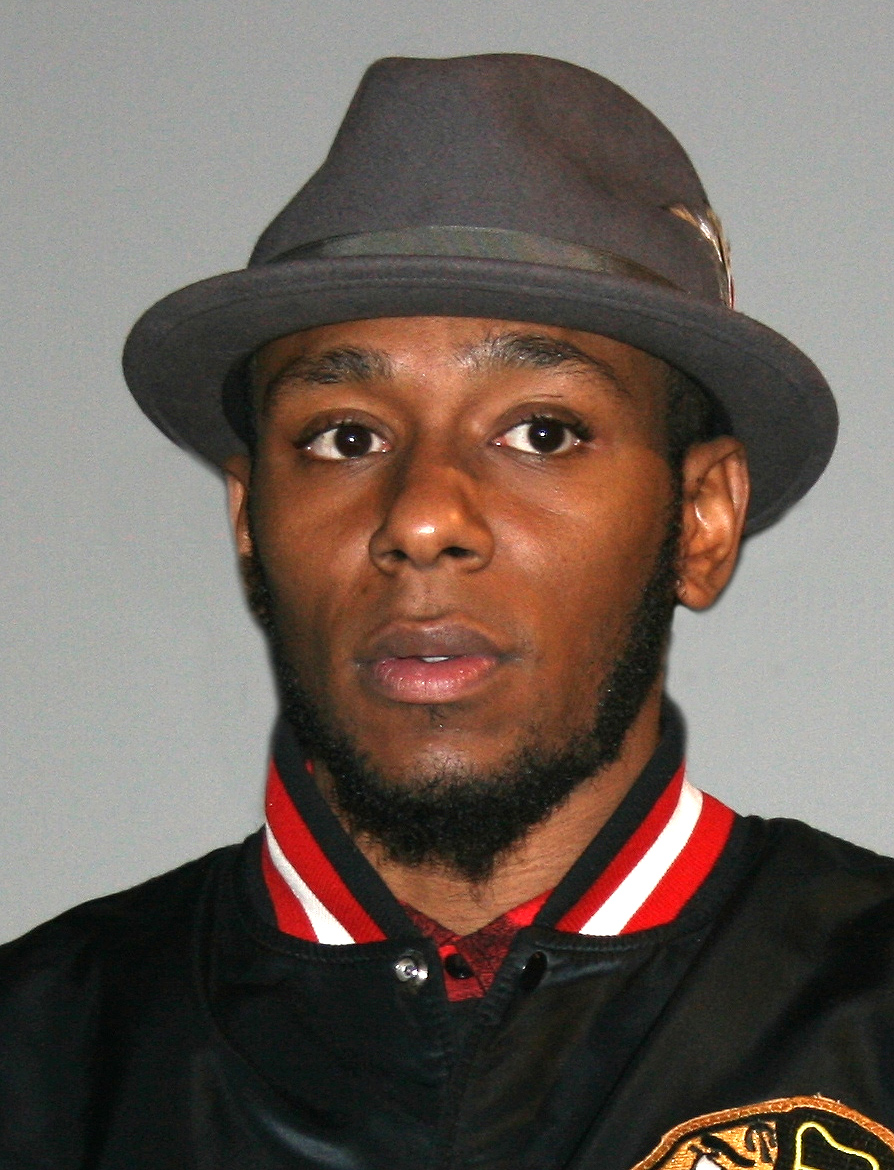
- Studio albums: 5
- Extended plays: 1
- Compilation albums: 4
- Singles: 18
- Music videos: 30
- Collaboration albums: 5
- Features singles: 11

The discography of Yasiin Bey (formerly known as Mos Def), an American rapper, consists of five solo studio albums, five collaborative studio albums, four compilation albums, one extended play, and 29 singles (11 as a featured artist). In 1994, Bey began his hip hop career in the underground rap group, UTD (Urban Thermo Dynamics), alongside his sibling group members DCQ and Ces, after which he pursued a solo career. In 1998, he made his mainstream debut on Rawkus Records in the duo Black Star, with rapper Talib Kweli. "Definition", the lead single from Black Star's self-titled debut album, reached No. 60 on the Billboard Hot 100 and No. 3 on the Hot Rap Singles chart.

In 1999, Yasiin Bey released his solo debut album Black on Both Sides, which was certified Gold in the US and featured the singles "Ms. Fat Booty", which reached No. 20 on the US Billboard Hot Rap Singles chart, and "Umi Says", which reached No. 60 on the UK Singles Chart. Bey performed on several compilations from Rawkus Records and other independent compilation albums. Among them was the single "Oh No" with Pharoahe Monch and Nate Dogg which reached No. 83 on the Hot 100 and No. 1 on the Hot Rap Singles. In 2001, his single "Jam on It" from Underground Airplay Version 1.0 reached No. 23 on the Hot Rap Tracks. In 2002, he appeared on the track "Brown Sugar (Extra Sweet)" on the soundtrack to the film Brown Sugar. Featuring Faith Evans, "Brown Sugar (Extra Sweet)" reached No. 71 on the Hot R&B/Hip-Hop Songs chart.

In 2004, Yasiin Bey released his second solo album The New Danger, in which he experimented with other genres such as rock and R&B. The single "Sex, Love & Money" reached No. 90 on the R&B chart. Later the same year saw the release of UTD album Manifest Destiny under the independent label Illsion Media, run by Bey's brother and fellow group member DCQ. The album featured a compilation of previously unreleased and re-released tracks recorded during the original UTD run. Bey's third solo album, Tru3 Magic, was released in 2006 to very little hype. Its single "Undeniable" charted only on the Hot R&B/Hip-Hop Singles Sales chart but was nominated for the Grammy Award for Best Rap Performance in 2007.

Yasiin Bey's fourth solo album The Ecstatic was released in 2009 on Downtown Records with distribution by Universal Records. His fifth album Negus was exclusively premiered during Art Basel in Hong Kong on March 29, 2019. According to a press release, it will never receive a physical or digital release but will be displayed at sound installations around the world.

In April 2022, a release date for the long-awaited Black Star project was officially announced. The album titled No Fear of Time was released via Luminary on May 3, 2022. In 2024, Bey announced an extended play Money Christmas, his first solo project in five years. It debuted on December 15 as a pay-per-view livestream on Bandcamp, and is set to release on March 15 the following year. Also, the same month the EP was released, Bey announced a new project with the Alchemist titled Forensics, which premiered on February 7 with a pay-per-view Bandcamp livestream, and it set to release on March 28.

== Albums ==
=== Studio albums ===
List of albums, with selected chart positions and certifications
Title	Details	Peak chart positions								Sales	Certifications
Title	Details	US	US R&B	US Rap	AUS	CAN	FRA	SWI	UK	Sales	Certifications
Black on Both Sides	Released: October 12, 1999; Label: Rawkus, Universal; Format: CD, LP, cassette, digital download	25	3	—	—	—	—	—	110	US: 913,000	RIAA: Gold; BPI: Silver
The New Danger	Released: October 12, 2004; Label: Rawkus, Geffen; Format: CD, LP, digital download	5	2	1	—	12	103	50	56	US: 513,000	RIAA: Gold
True Magic	Released: December 29, 2006; Label: Geffen; Format: CD	77	25	12	—	—	—	—	—	US: 97,000	
The Ecstatic	Released: June 9, 2009; Label: Downtown; Format: CD, LP, digital download	9	5	2	86	24	172	90	167	US: 168,000	
Negus (Note: Negus is Yasiin Bey’s fifth studio album, entirely produced by Lord Tusk, Steven Julien, and ACyde and was recorded in London in 2015. Negus was exclusively premiered during Art Basel in Hong Kong on March 29, 2019. According to a press release, the album will never receive a physical or digital release but will be displayed at sound installations around the world.)	Released: November 15, 2019; Label: self-released; Format: Sound installation	—	—	—	—	—	—	—	—		
"—" denotes a recording that did not chart or was not released in that territory.

=== Collaborative albums ===
Title	Details	Chart positions	
Title	Details	US	US R&B
Mos Def & Talib Kweli Are Black Star (with Talib Kweli as Black Star)	Released: September 29, 1998; Label: Rawkus, Priority; Format: CD, digital download, LP	53	13
Manifest Destiny (with UTD)	Released: October 26, 2004; Label: Illson Media; Format: CD, digital download, LP	—	—
December 99th (with Ferrari Sheppard, as Dec 99th)	Released: 2016; Label: A Country Called Earth; Format: CD, digital download, LP	—	—
No Fear of Time (with Talib Kweli as Black Star)	Released: May 3, 2022; Label: Luminary; Format: streaming	—	—
Forensics (with The Alchemist)	To be released: TBA; Label: ALC; Format: streaming	—	—

=== Compilation albums ===
Title	Details
We Are Hip-Hop: Me, You, Everybody	Released: 2002; Label: Sattan; Format: CD
Mos Definite	Released: April 20, 2007; Label: Frequent; Format: CD
We Are Hip-Hop: Me, You, Everybody, Pt. 2	Released: 2008; Label: Sattan; Format: CD
Audio 3	Released: 2008; Label: Oarfin; Format: CD

== Extended plays ==
Title	Details
Money Christmas	To be released: March 15, 2025; Label: Self-released; Format: Streaming

== Singles ==
=== Solo ===
Title	Year	Chart positions				Certifications	Album
Title	Year	US Bub.	US R&B	US Rap	UK	Certifications	Album
"Universal Magnetic"	1997	—	—^{[A]}	—	—		Soundbombing
"Ms. Fat Booty" / "Mathematics"	1999	—	54	20	85		Black on Both Sides
"Umi Says"	1999	—	—	—	60		Black on Both Sides
"Brown Sugar (Extra Sweet)" [featuring Faith Evans]	2002	—	71	—	—		Brown Sugar (soundtrack)
"Sex, Love & Money"	2004	—	90	—	—		The New Danger
"Close Edge"	2004	—	44^{[B]}	—	—		The New Danger
"Ghetto Rock"	2004	—	—	—	—		The New Danger
"Sunshine"	2005	—	—	—	—		The New Danger
"Undeniable"	2006	—	31^{[B]}	—	—		True Magic
"Life in Marvelous Times"	2008	—	—	—	—		The Ecstatic
"Quiet Dog Bite Hard"	2009	—	—	—	—		The Ecstatic
"Casa Bey"	2009	—	—	—	—		The Ecstatic

- A. Charted only on the Bubbling Under R&B/Hip-Hop Singles chart, a 25-song extensions of the original Hot R&B/Hip-Hop Songs chart.
- B. Charted only on the Hot Singles Sales or Hot R&B/Hip-Hop Singles Sales charts.

=== Collaborative singles ===
Title	Year	Chart positions				Album
Title	Year	US	US R&B	US Rap	UK	Album
"Body Rock" (with Tash & Q-Tip)	1998	—	65	21	—	Lyricist Lounge, Volume One
"Definition" (with Talib Kweli)	1998	60	31	3	—	Mos Def & Talib Kweli are Black Star
"Respiration" (with Talib Kweli featuring Common)	1999	—	54	6	—	Mos Def & Talib Kweli are Black Star
"Oh No" (with Pharoahe Monch featuring Nate Dogg)	2000	83	22	1	24	Lyricist Lounge 2
"Black Iz Back" (with Mau Maus)	2000					Bamboozled (soundtrack)
"It Ain't My Fault" (with Preservation Hall, Trombone Shorty, Allen Toussaint)	2012					Non-album single
"Sensei on the Block" (with Ski Beatz)	2015	—	—	—	—	Non-album single

- A. Charted only on the Hot Singles Sales or Hot R&B/Hip-Hop Singles Sales charts.

=== As featured artist ===
Title	Year	Chart positions				Album
Title	Year	US Bub.	US R&B	US Rap	US Alt	Album
"The Love Song" (Da Bush Babees featuring Mos Def)	1996	17	66	15	—	Gravity
"Bullshittin' (B.S.'n...)" (N'Dea Davenport featuring Mos Def)	1998	—	101	—	—	N'Dea Davenport
"Travellin' Man" (DJ Honda featuring Mos Def)	1998	13	76	17	—	h II
"B-Boy Document" (The High & Mighty featuring Mos Def and Skillz)	1999	—	63	7	—	Home Field Advantage / Soundbombing II
"A Brighter Day" (Ronny Jordan featuring Mos Def)	2000	—	54^{[A]}	20	—	A Brighter Day
"Love Rain (Head Nod Mix)" (Jill Scott featuring Mos Def)	2000					data-sort-value="" style="background: var(--background-color-interactive, #ececec); color: var(--color-base, inherit); vertical-align: middle; text-align: center; " class="table-na" | Non-album single
"Hit On Me (Hi-Tek Remix)"	2001					Chapter 1: Love, Pain & Forgiveness
"Six Days (Remix)" (DJ Shadow featuring Mos Def)	2002	—	38^{[A]}	—	—	Six Days 12"
"Wylin' Out" (with Diverse and Prefuse 73)	2002	—	65	—	—	Urban Renewal Program
"Wanna B Where U R (Thisizzaluvsong)" (Floetry featuring Mos Def)	2003	—	116	—	—	Barbershop 2: Back in Business (soundtrack) / Floacism "Live"
"Magnetic Arts" (DJ Honda featuring Mos Def)	2009	—	—	—	—	DJ Honda IV
"Cream of the Planet" (Ski Beatz featuring Mos Def)	2009					24 Hour Karate School
"Stylo" (Gorillaz featuring Mos Def and Bobby Womack)	2010	3	—	—	24	Plastic Beach
"Bang Bien" (Nightmares on Wax featuring Yasiin Bey)	2025					Echo45 Sound System

- A. Charted only on the Hot Singles Sales or Hot R&B/Hip-Hop Singles Sales charts.

== Other appearances ==
Year	Song	Artist(s)	Album
1996	"Intro"	Da Bush Babees	Gravity
1996	"S.O.S."	Da Bush Babees	Gravity
1996	"Big Brother Beat"	De La Soul	"Stakes Is High"
1996	"Stakes Is High (Remix)" [also featuring Truth Enola)]	De La Soul	"Itzsoweezee (HOT)"
1996	"Shinjiro"	DJ Krush	MiLight
1997	"Light (Can You See It?)"	DJ Krush	Holonic-The Self Megamix
1997	"BMT"	Towa Tei, Biz Markie	Sound Museum
1997	"If You Can Huh..."	—N/a	Soundbombing
1998	"World Famous"	Funkmaster Flex	The Mixtape Volume 3: 60 Minutes of Funk, The Final Chapter
1998	"Crying at Airports (Shawn J. Period Remix)"	Whale	Four Big Speakers 12"
1998	"Rock Rock Y'all"	A Tribe Called Quest, Punchline, Wordsworth and Jane Doe	The Love Movement
1999	"Double Trouble"	The Roots	Things Fall Apart
1999	"Next Universe"	—N/a	Soundbombing II
1999	"Cross Town Beef"	Medina Green, DCQ	Soundbombing II
1999	"Tinseltown to the Boogiedown"	Scritti Politti	Anomie & Bonhomie
1999	"If It's Alright Y'all"	Brixx	Superrappin: The Album
1999	"Saturday Nite" (J Dilla Remix)	Brand New Heavies	Delicious Vinyl Presents... Prime Cuts Vol. 1
1999	"All Praises Due"	A.D.L.I.B.	Urban Renewal: Word on the Street
2000	"Hurricane"	Common, Black Thought, Dice Raw, Flo Brown, Jazzyfatnastees	The Hurricane (soundtrack)
2000	"Foundation"	DJ Honda	h 2000
2000	"You (Feel Good Remix)"	Samuel Christian	Black and White (soundtrack)
2000	"On My Own"	The Black Eyed Peas, Les Nubians	Bridging the Gap
2000	"Eve"	Spacek	"Eve"
2000	"A Tree Never Grown"	A.L., Fre, Grafh, Invincible, J-Live, Jane Doe, Kofi Taha, Rubix, Tame One & Wordsworth	Hip Hop for Respect
2000	"One Four Love Pt. 2"	Cappadonna, Channel Live, Crunch Lo, Rock, Shyheim & Wise Intelligent	Hip Hop for Respect
2000	"What's That? (¿Que Eso?)"	Tony Touch, De La Soul	The Piece Maker
2000	"The Questions"	Common	Like Water for Chocolate
2000	"I've Committed Murder (Gang Starr Remix)"	Macy Gray, Gang Starr	Lyricist Lounge 2
2000	"Ms. Fat Booty 2"	Ghostface Killah	Lyricist Lounge 2
2000	"Bounce"	DJ Hasebe	Hey World
2000	"Can U C the Pride in the Panther" (Male/Female Version)	2Pac	The Rose That Grew from Concrete
2001	"Do Your Best"	Femi Kuti	Fight to Win
2001	"Jam on It"	DJ Spinbad	Underground Airplay Version 1.0
2001	"Reminisce"	Bilal, Common	1st Born Second
2001	"Get Ta Steppin'"	Hi-Tek, Vina Mojica	Hi-Teknology
2001	"Black and Blue"	Mekhi Phifer	Carmen: A Hip Hopera
2001	"Street Sounds"	Charlie Hunter Quartet	Songs from the Analog Playground
2001	"Creole"	Charlie Hunter Quartet	Songs from the Analog Playground
2001	"Seven Days (DJ Premier Remix)"	Craig David	"Seven Days"
2001	"My Nutmeg Phantasy"	Macy Gray, Angie Stone	The Id
2002	"Breakdown"	—N/a	Brown Sugar (soundtrack)
2002	"Brown Sugar (Fine)"	Adaritha	Brown Sugar (soundtrack)
2002	"I Against I"	Massive Attack	Blade II (soundtrack)
2002	"Freak Daddy"	—N/a	Soundbombing III
2002	"Mujuo"	Toshinobu Kubota	United Flow
2003	"Here We Are"	Mystic	Learning to Breathe... Cuts for Luck and Scars for Freedom, Continued
2003	"On the Run"	Mark Ronson, M.O.P.	Here Comes the Fuzz
2003	"Guess You Didn't Love Me"	Terri Walker	Untitled
2004	"Two Words"	Kanye West, Freeway, Harlem Boys Choir	The College Dropout
2004	"Living for Today"	Toshinobu Kubota	Time to Share
2004	"She Wants to Move (Native Tongues Remix)"	N*E*R*D, Common, De La Soul, Q-Tip	"Maybe"
2004	"Beauty in the Dark (Groove with You)"	The Isley Brothers	Taken to the Next Phase (Reconstructions)
2005	"Love It or Leave It Alone"	Alicia Keys, Common	Unplugged
2005	"Bin Laden"	Immortal Technique	Shade 45: Sirius Bizness
2005	"Yo-Yo-Yo (Street)"	Medina Green	---
2006	"The Corner (Remix)"	Scarface, Common	My Homies Part 2
2006	"Superstar"	Ge-ology	Facets
2006	"Victory"	K-Salaam, Sizzla	The World Is Ours
2006	"Where We At"	Jurassic 5	Feedback
2006	"Here Comes the Champ"	Dan the Automator, Anwar Superstar	Dan the Automator Presents 2K7
2006	"We Get Down"	Hi-Tek, Bootsy Collins, Raphael Saadiq	Hi-Teknology²: The Chip
2006	"Let It Go"	Little Brother & DJ Drama	Separate but Equal
2007	"Hey Baby"	Stephen Marley	Mind Control
2007	"Drunk and Hot Girls"	Kanye West	Graduation
2007	"Good Night"		Graduation
2007	"Brooklyn in My Mind [Crooklyn Dodgers III]"	9th Wonder, Jean Grae, Memphis Bleek	The Dream Merchant Vol. 2
2007	"D.A.N.C.E. (Benny Blanco Remix)"	Justice, Spank Rock	†
2008	"No Particular Place to Go"	—N/a	Cadillac Records: Music from the Motion Picture
2008	"Rising Down"	The Roots, Styles P, Dice Raw	Rising Down
2009	"America"	K'naan, Chali 2na	Troubadour
2009	"Mountain Sunlight"	Jazz Liberatorz	Fruit of the Past
2009	"On the Vista"	BlakRoc	BlakRoc
2009	"Ain't Nothing Like You (Hoochie Coo)"	BlakRoc	BlakRoc
2010	"Sweepstakes"	Gorillaz, Hypnotic Brass Ensemble	Plastic Beach
2010	"New York Is Killing Me (Remix)"	Gil Scott-Heron	---
2010	"Sweetest Fruit"	Baraka Blue	SoundHeart
2010	"Breakfast"	Curren$y	Pilot Talk
2010	"The Day" (also featuring Jay Electronica)	Curren$y	Pilot Talk
2010	24 Hour Karate School Pt. 1	Ski Beatz	24 Hour Karate School
2010	"Prowler 2" (also featuring Jean Grae, Jay Electronica & Joell Ortiz)	Ski Beatz	24 Hour Karate School
2010	"Arials" (also featuring Curren$y, Whosane, Terri Walker & Stalley)	Ski Beatz	24 Hour Karate School
2010	"Taxi" (also featuring Whosane)	Ski Beatz	24 Hour Karate School
2010	"Lord Lord Lord" (also featuring Swizz Beatz, Raekwon & Charlie Wilson)	Kanye West	G.O.O.D. Fridays
2010	"Don't Look Down" (also featuring Lupe Fiasco & Big Sean)	Kanye West	G.O.O.D. Fridays
2012	"Black Radio"	Robert Glasper	Black Radio
2012	"The Very Best"	Dee-1, Mannie Fresh	Save the Children
2013	"Freedom Is Everyone's Job"	Preservation	Old Numbers
2013	"They Die By Dawn and Other Short Stories"	The Bullitts, Lucy Liu, Jay Electronica	They Die By Dawn (And Other Short Stories)
2015	"Back Home"	ASAP Rocky, ASAP Yams, Acid	At. Long. Last. ASAP
2015	"Never Die"	Golden Rules	Golden Ticket
2016	"Give It Up Today (If I Ruled the World)"	Tara Maq, K'naan, Tink	Chi-Star
2016	"R.E.D."	A Tribe Called Red	We Are the Halluci Nation
2017	"Buy My App"	Buy Muy Drugs	Buy My Drugs
2018	"Kids See Ghosts"	Kids See Ghosts	Kids See Ghosts
2019	"Education"	MadGibbs, Black Thought	Bandana
2019	"Treal"	Robert Glasper	Fuc Yo Feelings
2020	"Breathe"	Navy Blue	Song of Sage: Post Panic!
2022	”Stars”	J.I.D	The Forever Story
2024	"Space"	Hypnotic Brass Ensemble	Hypnotic Joints, Vol. 2
2025	"Yore"	Meedak	Raps of Yore
2026	"Damascus"	Gorillaz, Omar Souleyman	The Mountain

== Videos ==
- 1994: Manifest Destiny (Urban Thermo Dynamics)
- 1996: The Love Song (Da Bush Babees featuring Mos Def)
- 1998: Travellin' Man (DJ Honda featuring Mos Def)
- 1998: Body Rock (Mos Def, Q-Tip & Tash)
- 1999: Tinseltown to the Boogiedown (Scritti Politti featuring Mos Def & Lee Majors)
- 1999: B-Boy Document '99 (The High & Mighty featuring Mos Def & Skillz)
- 1999: Ms. Fat Booty (Mos Def)
- 1999: Umi Says (Mos Def)
- 2000: One Four Love (Part 1) (Common, Kool G Rap, Posdnuos, Rah Digga, Sporty Thievz, Black Star, Pharaohe Monch & Shabaam Sahdeeq)
- 2000: Blak Iz Blak (Mos Def, Canibus, Charli Baltimore, MC Serch, Mums, DJ Scratch & Gano Grills)
- 2000: Oh No (Mos Def, Pharoahe Monch & Nate Dogg)
- 2002: Brown Sugar (Extra Sweet) (Mos Def featuring Faith Evans)
- 2003: Wanna B Where U R (Thisizzaluvsong) (Floetry featuring Mos Def)
- 2004: Two Words (Kanye West featuring Mos Def, Freeway & The Harlem Boys Choir)
- 2004: Ghetto Rock (Mos Def)
- 2004: Sex, Love & Money (Mos Def)
- 2005: Yo-Yo-Yo (Medina Green featuring Mos Def)
- 2005: Dollar Day (Mos Def)
- 2009: Casa Bey (Mos Def)
- 2009: Ain't Nothing Like You (Hoochie Coo) (The Black Keys featuring Mos Def & Jim Jones)
- 2009: Taxi (Snippet) (Ski featuring Mos Def)
- 2009: Supermagic (Mos Def)
- 2010: History (Mos Def featuring Talib Kweli)
- 2010: White Drapes (Snippet) (Mos Def)
- 2010: Stylo (Gorillaz featuring Mos Def & Bobby Womack)
- 2010: It Ain't My Fault (Gulf Aid All-Stars featuring Preservation Hall Jazz Band, Mos Def, Lenny Kravitz & Trombone Shorty)
- 2010: Cream of the Planet (Ski Beatz featuring Mos Def)
- 2013: They Die By Dawn (The Bullitts featuring Mos Def, Lucy Liu, Jay Electronica)
- 2016: R.E.D. (THE HALLUCI NATION featuring YASIIN BEY, Narcy & Black Bear)
- 2022: Peppa (Westside Gunn featuring Black Star)
- 2023: Space (Hypnotic Brass Ensemble)

== See also ==
- Black Star discography
