= The Ecstatic =

Studio album by Mos Def
- Released: June 9, 2009
- Studios: Record Plant; Someothaship Connect (Los Angeles); Downtown Music (New York); Hovercraft (Virginia Beach)
- Genres: Conscious rap; alternative hip-hop
- Length: 45:34
- Label: Downtown
- Producers: Georgia Anne Muldrow; J Dilla; Madlib; Mos Def; Mr. Flash; The Neptunes; Oh No; Preservation

Mos Def chronology
True Magic (2006)	The Ecstatic (2009)	December 99th (2016)

Singles from The Ecstatic
- 1. "Life in Marvelous Times" Released: November 4, 2008; 2. "Quiet Dog Bite Hard" Released: January 13, 2009; 3. "Casa Bey" Released: May 26, 2009

The Ecstatic is the fourth studio album by American rapper Mos Def, released on June 9, 2009, by the independent record label Downtown Records. After venturing further away from hip-hop with an acting career and two poorly received albums, Mos Def signed a recording contract with Downtown and recorded The Ecstatic primarily at the Record Plant in Los Angeles. He worked with producers such as Preservation, Mr. Flash, Oh No, and Madlib, with the latter two reusing instrumentals they had produced on Stones Throw Records. The work of Stones Throw rapper MF Doom was also cited by Mos Def as an influence, while singer Georgia Anne Muldrow, formerly of the record label, performed as one of the album's few guest vocalists, along with rappers Slick Rick and Talib Kweli.

Described by music journalists as a conscious and alternative hip-hop record, The Ecstatic features an eccentric, internationalist quality. Mos Def's raps about global politics, love, war, spirituality, and social conditions are informed by the zeitgeist of the late 2000s, Black internationalism, and Pan-Islamic ideas, incorporating many Islamic references throughout the album. Its loosely structured, lightly reverbed songs use unconventional time signatures and samples taken from a variety of international musical styles, including Afrobeat, soul, Eurodance, jazz, reggae, Latin, and Middle Eastern music. Mos Def titled the album after one of his favorite novels, Victor LaValle's The Ecstatic (2002), believing its titular phrase evoked his singular musical vision. For the album's front cover, a still from Charles Burnett's 1978 film Killer of Sheep was reproduced in a red tint.

The Ecstatic charted at number nine on the Billboard 200 in its first week of release and eventually sold 168,000 copies. Its sales benefited from its presence on Internet blogs and the release of a T-shirt illustrating the record's packaging alongside a label printed with a code redeemable for a free download of the album. To further support the album, Mos Def embarked on an international tour with concerts in North America, Japan, Australia, and the United Kingdom between August 2009 and April 2010. As his DJ on the tour, Preservation began to develop remixes of the album's songs, which he later released on the remix album The REcstatic in 2013.

A widespread critical success, The Ecstatic was viewed as a return to form for Mos Def and one of the best albums from 2009, with reviewers applauding its exuberant musical feel, adventurous creative range, and shrewd lyrical performances. Some publications ranked it among the greatest albums of the 2000s decade, including The Times at number 30. However, it struggled to reach mainstream audiences beyond Mos Def's fan base and led the already disillusioned rapper further away from the music industry, resulting in less recorded work from him over subsequent years.

== Background ==
By the mid-2000s, Mos Def had established himself as one of hip-hop's leading auteurs with records that sold millions of copies while realizing a pan-African worldview, although the rapper grew increasingly wary of the music industry. In 2006, his third album True Magic was released haphazardly by Geffen Records to fulfill a contractual obligation while he was devoting more time to his acting career. The quality of the album, along with his repeated ventures away from recording hip-hop, left "some fans wondering if Mos Def's acting accomplishments were finally affecting his music", PopMatters critic Quentin B. Huff chronicles. Speaking with Spank Rock for Interview magazine, Mos Def expressed a jadedness with the commodifying aspect of the hip-hop industry and elucidated his artistic goals at the time:

You have to get busy. There are so many things ... I can't control what people think. I'm not trying to manipulate people's thoughts or sentiments. I write all the time. You have to experience life, make observations, ask questions ... I come to uplift the people. It doesn't have to be fashionable. I don't mind being black. I'm black out loud. It's more than the people that they are, it's the condition that they represent. I don't hate nobody. I hate certain conditions that are inflicted upon the people—and they're helpless with it. To me the job of an artist is to provide a useful and intelligent vocabulary for the world to be able to articulate feelings they experience every day.

After his tenure with Geffen ended, Mos Def signed a record deal with the independent label Downtown Records and proceeded to record The Ecstatic as his first album for the label.

== Recording and production ==
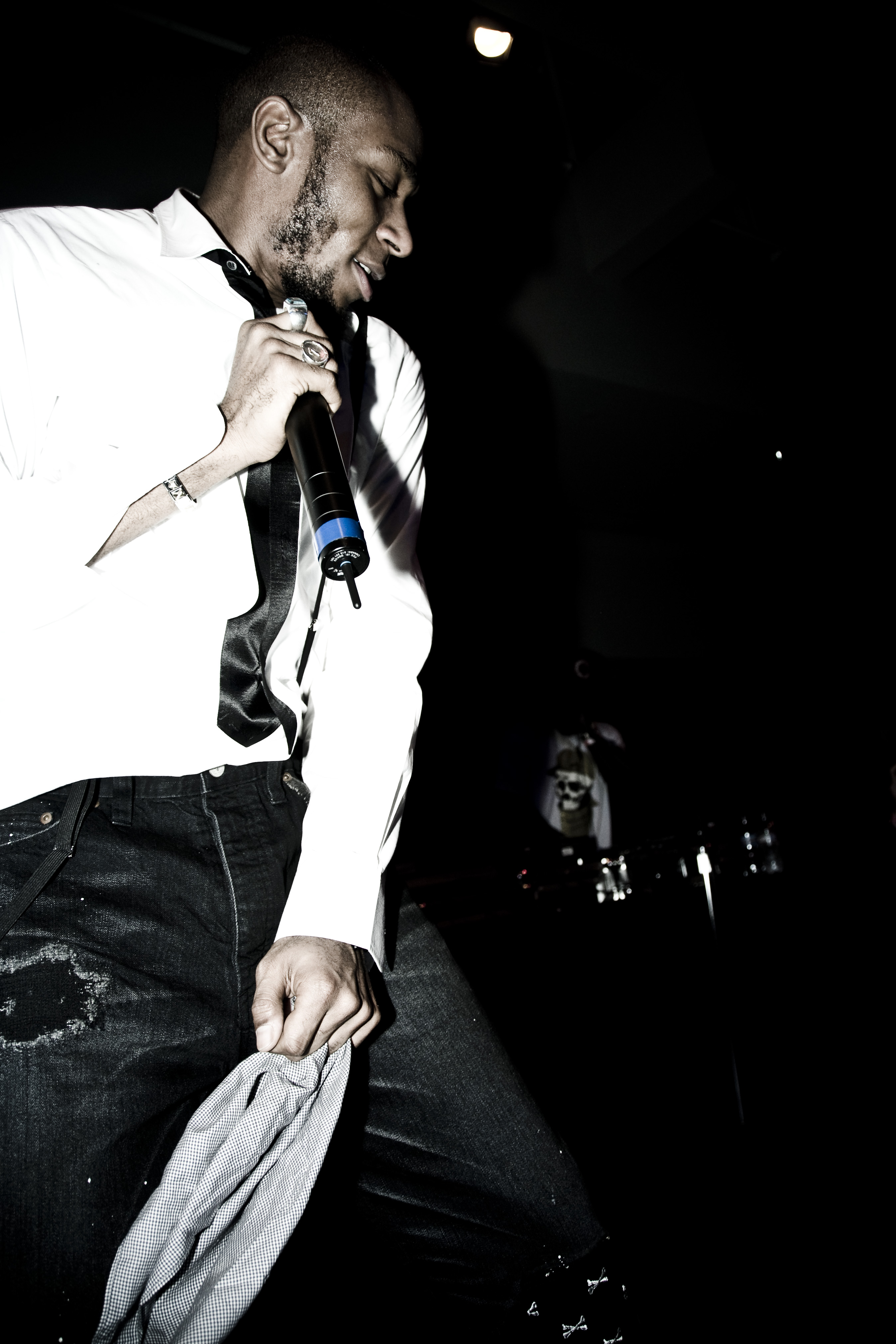
Mos Def in 2008

Mos Def recorded most of the album in sessions at the Record Plant in Los Angeles. The songs "Twilight Speedball", "No Hay Nada Mas", and "Roses" were partially recorded at Hovercraft Studios in Virginia Beach, Someothaship Connect in Los Angeles, and New York City's Downtown Music Studios. He worked with producers Mr. Flash, Oh No, Madlib, and Preservation, who previously produced some of True Magic's songs. For The Ecstatic, Oh No reused some of his productions from his 2007 album Dr. No's Oxperiment, while Madlib incorporated samples from his Beat Konducta in India (2007) record. For "Life in Marvelous Times", Mr. Flash reused the beat from "Champions" – his 2006 collaboration with the French hip-hop group TTC – while "History" used a beat produced by J Dilla before his death.

With Preservation, Mos Def produced "Casa Bey" after a 2006 trip to Rio de Janeiro, where local rapper MV Bill introduced him to the music of Banda Black Rio. (Note: According to Nate Patrin of Pitchfork, it is rumored that Mos Def was in South America at the time scouting shooting locations for The Brazilian Job – the purported sequel to the 2003 film The Italian Job (in which he had starred) – "before it got caught up in development hell".) Mos Def and Preservation altered one of the band's songs – "Casa Forte", an instrumental featuring their characteristic blend of funk, jazz, soul, and Brazilian rhythms – and used it as the beat. The original song title – meaning "strong house" in Portuguese – was changed to "Casa Bey"; Bey was Mos Def's family surname. According to him, he tried to enlist rappers Jay Electronica, Black Thought, and Trugoy for the song, but they all found it too difficult to rap over the instrumental.

The recording sessions featured collaborations with singer Georgia Anne Muldrow and rappers Slick Rick and Talib Kweli – Mos Def's partner in the rap duo Black Star. Muldrow sang and played piano on "Roses", which she originally wrote and recorded in 2008 for her album Umsindo (2009). She said Mos Def "borrowed" the song for The Ecstatic after they met through a mutual friend. "They came over one day and started playing 'Roses.' He was singing the song and knew it. He said 'I wanna grab that.' I said, 'Man, I already got this as a single'. He just wanted that song. He snatched it up real quick", she recalled in laughter.

Along with Madlib, Oh No, and J Dilla, Muldrow had been an affiliate of Stones Throw Records; according to journalist Nathan Rabin, they collectively produced half of the album, lending its sound a "sympathetic" quality. During the recording, Mos Def was also influenced by fellow rapper MF Doom, at one point improvising raps from the latter's 2004 album Mm..Food while in the studio. "He rhymes as weird as I feel", he said of Doom, citing his Madlib collaboration Madvillainy (2004) as well. With The Ecstatic, Mos Def said he wanted to offer listeners sincere, uninhibited observations about life and love, "some truth and positive heart lift", without the need for club songs. "No disrespect to [the club]".

== Music and lyrics ==
"Auditorium"
On "Auditorium", Mos Def raps about daily struggles and global politics over a Middle Eastern-influenced instrumental produced by Madlib.

The Ecstatic covers an international range of styles in a very loose and extemporaneous manner, held together by what Rabin describes as "a lyrical and sonic fascination with life beyond the Western World". According to Robert Christgau, the songs average two-and-a-half minutes and segue into one another without resolution, giving it the feel of a globally influenced hip-hop mixtape "with poles in Brooklyn and Beirut". The music reflects Mos Def's varied interests in jazz, poetry, Eastern rhythms, psychedelia, Spanish music, and the blues. The tracks on the first half are, as The Observer's Ben Thompson describes, "predominantly Eastward-looking", while the second half indulges more in Latin and reggae influences. Other sounds sampled or explored include Afrobeat ("Quiet Dog Bite Hard"), Eurodance ("Life in Marvelous Times"), Bollywood ("Supermagic"), and Philadelphia soul. "Supermagic" also draws on elements from Turkish acid rock and Mary Poppins, while on "No Hay Nada Mas", Mos Def sings and raps in Spanish over a flamenco-influenced production. He sings elsewhere on the album, often breaking into sing-song vamps during his raps. Along with his singing, the often sample-based music is unconventional in its use of what Preservation calls unusual time signatures and "awkward" breakdowns.

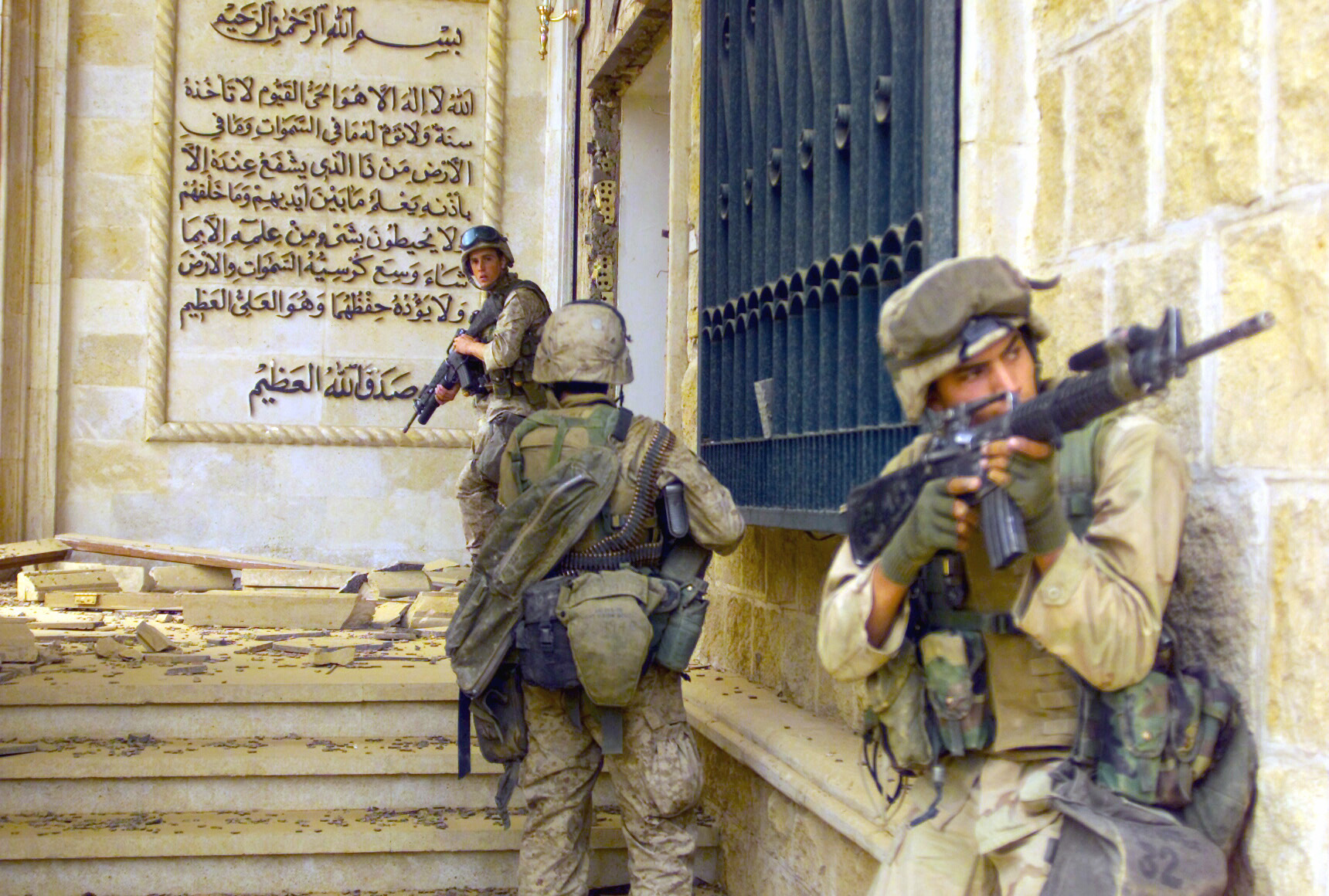
US marines in Baghdad during Operation Iraqi Freedom, April 2003. The album features criticism of the Iraq War.

According to The Independent's Simmy Richman, The Ecstatic's Eastern-influenced musical backdrop is reflective of Mos Def's "post-war on terror" themes. Richman calls it a conscious rap record, and No Ripcord's Ryan Faughnder regards it as "socially conscious alternative hip-hop". African-American studies and media scholar Sohail Daulatzai believes the album is informed by Black internationalist politics and Pan-Islamic ideas, while State magazine's Niall Byrne says it explores the theme of international relations on songs such as the Middle Eastern-influenced "The Embassy" and "Auditorium", which features an Iraq-themed guest rap by Slick Rick. On "The Embassy", Mos Def raps from the perspective of an outsider about the lifestyle of an ambassador at a luxury hotel, while the opening song "Supermagic" critiques government treatment of minority groups. Mos Def incorporates several Islamic references throughout the album, including samples of American Muslim activist Malcolm X, Turkish protest singer Selda Bağcan, and an Arab-language scene from the 1966 film The Battle of Algiers; additionally, the track "Wahid" is titled after the Arabic word for "oneness".

You're living at a time of extremism, a time of revolution, a time when there's got to be a change. People in power have misused it. And now there has to be a change and a better world has to be built and the only way it's going to be built is with extreme methods. And I, for one, will join in with anyone. I don't care what color you are, as long as you want to change this miserable condition that exists on this earth. Thank you.

— 1964 Malcolm X speech sampled for the beginning of the album

As on Mos Def's other albums, he speaks a dedication to God in Arabic ("Bismillah ar-Rahman ar-Raheem") at the start of The Ecstatic. This leads into "Supermagic" and its opening sample of Malcolm X's 1964 speech at Oxford Union. The sample prefaces the album's "small-globe statement", as Pitchfork journalist Nate Patrin explains, saying it indicates that Mos Def has "a stake in something greater than just one corner of the rap world". Alex Young from Consequence of Sound believes the speech introduces "a political album encompassing global beats and viewpoints". According to The Washington Post critic Allison Stewart, Mos Def seems equally interested in the Obama-era zeitgeist as in accounts of the past, such as the early-1980s Bedford–Stuyvesant setting of "Life in Marvelous Times". Young deems the song anthemic for "a seemingly paradoxical age that routinely sees events such as a Black man being elected president of a nation wallowing in racial inequality". From Christgau's perspective, Mos Def offers a credo in the lyrics: "More of less than ever before / It's just too much more for your mind to absorb / It's scary like hell, but there's no doubt / We can't be alive in no time but now".

Throughout The Ecstatic, Mos Def alternates between what AllMusic's Andy Kellman calls nonsensical yet intellectual raps and "seemingly nonchalant, off-the-cuff boasts", set against eccentric, lightly reverbed productions. According to The Guardian's Paul MacInnes, The Ecstatic features his characteristically "fragmented lyrical style, which loops words within phrases and plays on sound as much as meaning". "Auditorium" showcases his "complex and convoluted" lyricism delivered closely in rhythm with the beat, Patrin says, citing the lines "soul is the lion's roar, voice is the siren / I swing 'round, wring out and bring down the tyrant / chop a small axe and knock a giant lopsided". He explores Afrocentric themes on "Revelations" and compares love to a gunfight on "Pistola". On "Roses", Muldrow sings nature-friendly lyrics about drawing flowers in times of sadness rather than plucking them from the ground. "Roses is about creativity and human capacity", she explains. "A lot of times Western society makes [women] base our sense of worth on 'diamonds are forever' or 'a dozen roses' and that's how you prove your love to somebody … but you receive so many gifts and still feel empty. So draw them and let the roses come from inside."

== Title and packaging ==
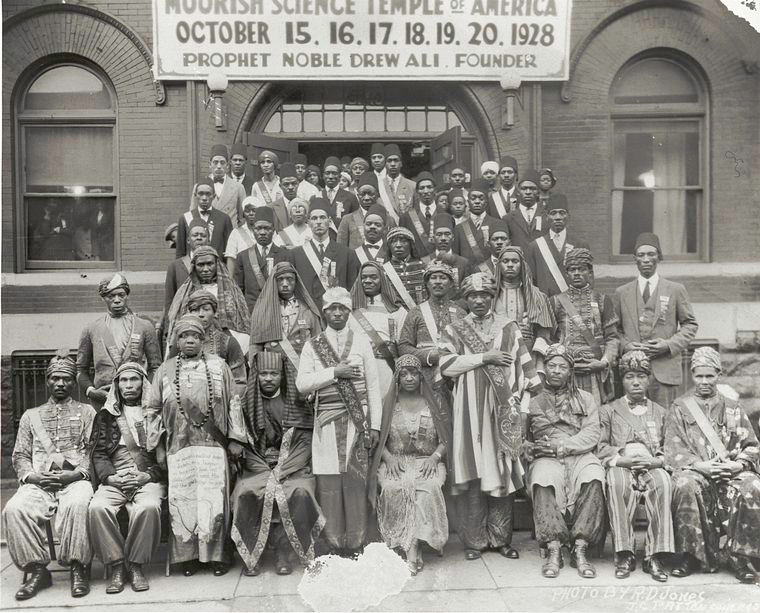
Attendees of the 1928 Moorish Science Temple Conclave; the photo was used for the album's back cover.

The Ecstatic was titled after Victor LaValle's 2002 dark humor novel. One of Mos Def's favorite novels, it was written about an overweight college dropout who fell into mental illness while living with his eccentric family in Queens, New York. According to Mos Def, the phrase "the ecstatic" was "used in the 17th and 18th centuries to describe people who were either mad or divinely inspired and consequently dismissed as kooks". The phrase resonated with him, as he believed no one else in hip-hop had ever recorded an album like The Ecstatic. "I feel like I was the only person who was capable of making this type of music in this type of way", he claimed. "I don't rap like nobody, I don't try to sound like nobody." He said "the ecstatic" also refers to "a type of devotional energy, an impossible dream that becomes reality but is discredited before it's realized. The airplane, a nutty idea. The telephone, the Internet. People who envisioned those were considered radical or extreme."

The Ecstatic was packaged with few liner notes and a two-sheet booklet featuring a photo of Mos Def taken using the Photo Booth software application. The front cover photo reproduced a still in red tint from Killer of Sheep, a low-budget 1978 film by Charles Burnett about African-American life in 1970s Watts, Los Angeles. According to Dale Eisinger from Complex, the "subtle and still-moving" photo reflects the ideas of cultural justice and global inequality present throughout Mos Def's career while capturing the "sonic construction" of The Ecstatic's music. "The cover has hazy, dream-like movement", Eisinger said, "appearing as a non-narrative, loose collection of vignettes that are tangentially fascinating and incredibly powerful." For the back cover, a 1928 photo of the Moorish Science Temple gathering in Chicago was used, which Daulatzai interpreted as another element of Mos Def's "Pan-Islamic mashup" on the album.

== Critical reception ==
Professional ratings
Aggregate scores
Source	Rating
AnyDecentMusic?	7.7/10
Metacritic	81/100
Review scores
Source	Rating
AllMusic	4/5 stars
Entertainment Weekly	B+
The Guardian	4/5 stars
The Irish Times	4/5 stars
MSN Music (Consumer Guide)	A
Pitchfork	8.0/10
Rolling Stone	3/5 stars
Spin	9/10
The Times	5/5 stars
USA Today	3.5/4 stars

The Ecstatic was met with widespread critical acclaim. After two poorly received records by Mos Def, it was viewed by critics as a return to the form of his 1999 debut album Black on Both Sides, earning some of the best reviews of his career. At Metacritic, which assigns a normalized rating out of 100 to reviews from professional publications, The Ecstatic received an average score of 81, based on 28 reviews. Aggregator AnyDecentMusic? gave it 7.7 out of 10, based on their assessment of the critical consensus.

In The New Yorker, The Ecstatic was hailed as Mos Def's "most conceptually knotty and ambitious work", while Aaron wrote in Spin that the "internationalist return to form" is also "perhaps his liveliest work". For The Irish Times, Jim Carroll said the rapper has not performed this engagingly or skillfully since his career beginnings, highlighting especially "Supermagic" and "Life in Marvelous Times". Mick Middles from The Quietus appraised it as "the joyful sound of a rampant artist, unrestrained by expectation or commercialism", with free-flowing music that escapes the boundaries his previous albums had merely pushed. Ben Thompson, in The Observer, believed the diverse range of samples make it "a crate-digger's wet dream" and "a thrillingly accessible demonstration of hip-hop's limitless creative possibilities" to a layperson. Writing for MSN Music, Christgau felt the songs are "devoid of hooks but full of sounds you want to hear again", along with "thoughtfully slurred" yet intelligible lyrics by Mos Def, whose creative vision warrants the introductory Malcolm X sample. In the opinion of Time's Josh Tyrangiel, his political meditations may not appeal to conservatives but are rich in "the rhythm, exuberance and wit Mos Def showed on his early records". Steve Jones of USA Today said his reflections on politics, love, religion, and societal conditions are full of insight and sincerity while calling the album his strongest effort.

Some reviewers were less impressed. Rolling Stone critic Christian Hoard found the quality of the songs inconsistent, while Slant Magazine's Eric Henderson claimed much of the music lacks song structure and "careen[s] wildly, free from the constraints of chorus and verse". Margaret Wappler evaluated the record with qualified praise in the Los Angeles Times, saying it "mostly lives up to its giddy name" but wanes occasionally while the artful samples may challenge listeners at first.

=== Accolades ===
At the end of 2009, The Ecstatic was named one of the year's 10 best albums. It was ranked 30th by The Guardian, 24th by Q, 23rd by Slant Magazine, 17th by Rolling Stone, 16th by Sputnikmusic, 15th by PopMatters, 10th by Relevant, 7th by Spin, and 3rd by eMusic; About.com and BBC Music both named it the year's best rap record. In The Village Voice's Pazz & Jop – an annual poll of American critics nationwide – The Ecstatic was voted the 11th best album of 2009. Christgau, the poll's creator, ranked it 12th on his own year-end list for The Barnes & Noble Review. The Times placed it at number 30 on the newspaper's decade-end list of the 100 greatest records from the 2000s. It finished at numbers 27 and 155 on similar lists published by Rhapsody and Rock's Backpages, respectively.

The Ecstatic also earned Mos Def nominations for the 52nd Annual Grammy Awards (2010) in the categories of Best Rap Album and Best Rap Solo Performance (for "Casa Bey"). However, he lost in both categories to Eminem's Relapse (2009) and Jay-Z's "D.O.A. (Death of Auto-Tune)" (2009), respectively.

== Marketing and sales ==
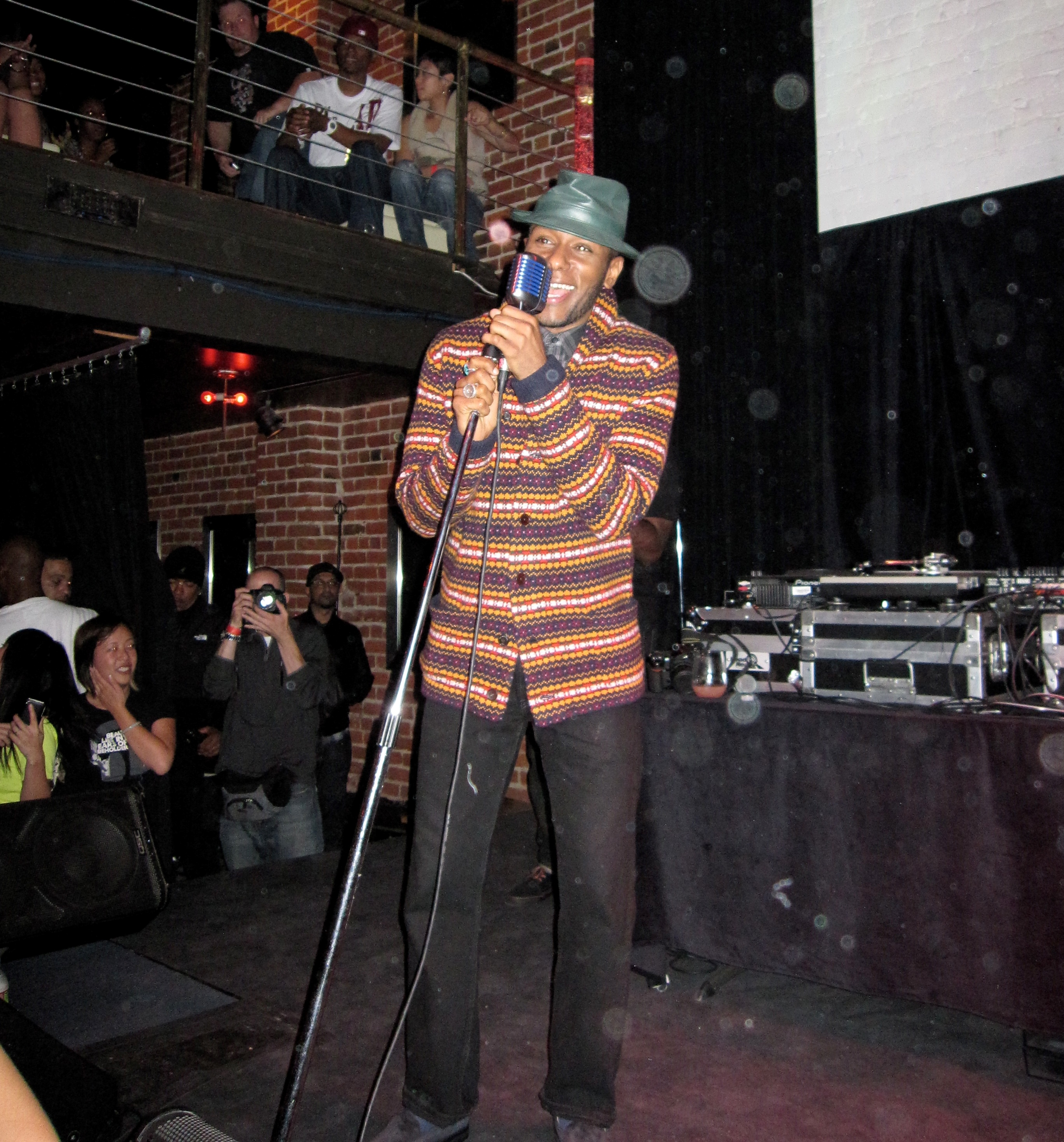
Mos Def performing at the New Parish in Oakland, October 2009

Released by Downtown on June 9, 2009, The Ecstatic sold 39,000 copies in its first week and debuted at number nine on the Billboard 200. This marked Mos Def's second appearance in the top 10 on the chart. The following week, he became the first recording artist to endorse the Original Music Tee, a T-shirt featuring the album cover on the front, the track listing on the back, and a tag with a code to download an MP3 copy of the record. The marketing strategy led to enough sales that Billboard factored the T-shirts as album units on the magazine's music charts. The Ecstatic also benefited from the number of mentions it received on Internet blog posts, which peaked during the week of June 29. The album reached 168,000 copies sold in March 2014.

Three singles were released to promote the album: "Life in Marvelous Times" on November 4, 2008; "Quiet Dog Bite Hard" on January 13, 2009; and "Casa Bey" on May 26. According to Charles Aaron, "Life in Marvelous Times" was the "most powerful and accessible song" Mos Def had ever recorded, but it could not even manage to receive airplay on radio stations in his native New York. "If [it] can't get on the radio, then I don't need to be on the radio", the rapper said in August, expressing a wavering interest in reaching mainstream audiences.

Mos Def supported the album further with an international tour, which began its North American leg in early August 2009. This stretch of concerts spanned a number of US and Canadian cities, including Chicago, Miami, Washington D.C., Miami, Portland, Calgary, and Vancouver. Jay Electronica performed as his opening act, and certain shows were co-headlined with Kweli and singer Erykah Badu. The leg concluded on October 3 with an evening performance slot at the Austin City Limits Music Festival. Mos Def continued touring into the following year, playing a series of concerts in Japan during late 2009, which were documented in an episode of the Current TV series Embedded. This was followed by his first headlining tour of Australia in January 2010 and a short series of April concerts in the United Kingdom.

=== Photo exhibit ===
Between January 30 and February 6, 2010, the HVW8 Art & Design Gallery in Los Angeles held an exclusive one-week exhibition titled "Mos Def: Ecstatic Moments – Photographs". It showcased a collection of photos taken by Cognito – a longtime hip-hop documentarian and colleague of Mos Def – capturing the rapper during the two years spent making and promoting The Ecstatic. Included in the exhibition were candid photographs of him in the studio with the album's producers, and photos of his experiences visiting and touring locations around the world, including the Cape of Good Hope and São Paulo. A series of "posse shots" taken at the end of concerts from the American tour were also displayed, showing the rapper with Jay Electronica, Kweli, Badu, and musician Shuggie Otis, who made an unexpected appearance during the tour.

The timing of the exhibition was meant to capitalize on Mos Def's two nominations for the Grammy Awards, which were being held that week. "I thought it was a perfect time to honor his presence while he's here", Cognito explained. "We've had a lot of our greats pass away in the past couple of years, be it Dilla or Bataan [sic], or whoever, and now everybody wants to talk 'Dilla Dilla Dilla' or whatever, but you weren't saying that while he was alive. Let's praise our heroes while they're alive."

=== Remix album ===
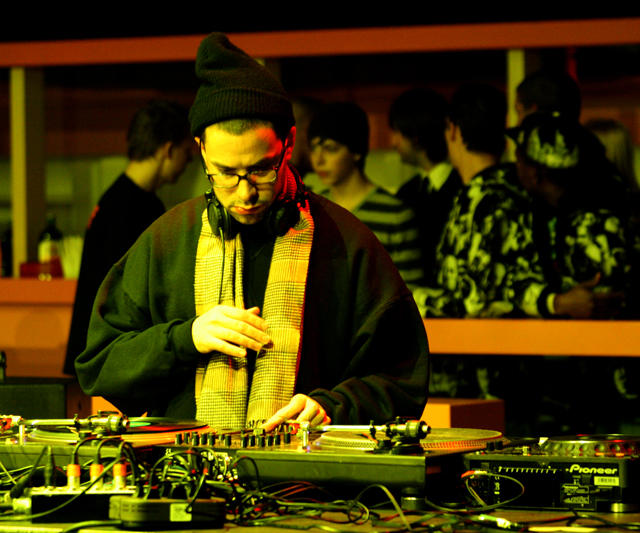
Preservation in 2007

While on tour as Mos Def's in-concert DJ, Preservation began to remix some of The Ecstatic's songs for their live routine. He challenged himself to remix the rest of the album as The REcstatic, taking more than a year and working with Jan Fairchild – the original record's mixing engineer. Preservation revisited sources for the original beats to find similar recordings that would correspond to each song's particular aesthetic while preserving Mos Def's vocals for the remixes. He wanted them to be sample-based and consistent in key, pitch, and tone to the original album, which he found difficult to achieve because of its unorthodox instrumentals and singing. "It's the result of countless hours of digging through records to sample", he recalled. "Constructing the beat, wrapping it around the vocal, adjusting the tempo, and so on". "Black Fantastic" – an outtake produced by Minnesota during The Ecstatic's recording – replaced "Casa Bey" in the final track listing, as Preservation had found the tempo and structure of the original song too difficult to make a satisfactory remix.

The REcstatic was released as a free download on June 12, 2013, by Preservation's imprint label, Mon Dieu Music. Reviewing the remix album in Tiny Mix Tapes, Samuel Diamond said the rapturous energy of the original record was given a "slightly rougher texture" on what he deemed "a respectful contribution to the canon of remix-based art, something that can be said for very few modern rap 'remixes'".

== Aftermath and legacy ==
It's machine-like how things are run now in hip-hop, and my ambitions are different. I'm not knocking it, but I have my mind on another type of prize. There's another way to achieve that [success] too. There's another way with less congestion, less emissions. I've been spending my time building that road. You have to look for validation from yourself. Who wants to be the outcast? But you have to commit to who you are. Also, a lot of it is the manifestation of society and colonialism in the industry. Radiohead can be as avant-garde as they want and still have pop success, but if you're black you have to surrender yourself to the flashing lights.

— Mos Def speaking on his disillusionment while promoting The Ecstatic

Despite The Ecstatic's success with fans and critics, Mos Def remained disillusioned with the music industry and "moved on creatively", according to Yardbarker journalist Evan Sawdey. Changing his name to Yasiin Bey, the rapper recorded sporadically during the 2010s, appearing on songs by other hip-hop artists such as ASAP Rocky, Ski Beatz, Currensy, and Kanye West. Meanwhile, he received media coverage for largely non-musical ventures and incidents, including a torture reenactment filmed in protest of the Guantanamo Bay detention camp and an illegal residence in Cape Town, South Africa, where he was detained for almost one year after trying to leave the country using a World Passport. In 2013, Beats Per Minute named The Ecstatic as the 112th best album of the past five years.

In 2015, the rapper went to London for recording sessions that would produce his next album Negus, using raps he had written during the previous few years. The following year, he announced on West's website that he was retiring from both the music and film industries, although he promised a few more collaborative recordings and one more solo album. Despite the 2016 Ferrari Sheppard collaboration December 99th, Albumism writer Jesse Ducker regards The Ecstatic as his "last hurrah" and "the last album I acknowledge that he released", as well as a reminder "that when [he] gives a shit, he's still as good as anyone at recording music." Ducker adds that its music should have won both Grammy Awards for which it was nominated in 2010.

After private presentations at art fairs in Morocco, Dubai, and Hong Kong, the rapper's next work Negus in Natural Person (or simply Negus) premiered to the public on November 15, 2019, as a "listening installation" at the Brooklyn Museum in New York. Billed as an homage to public figures who "led noble lives" such as Prince Alemayehu, Henrietta Lacks, and Nipsey Hussle, the exhibit was open for 10 weeks and featured the 28-minute musical album playable with on-ear wireless headphones given to attendees, alongside a visual artwork installation designed by the rapper, José Parlá, Julie Mehretu, and Ala Ebtekar. However, the album went unreleased outside of the exhibit, which itself was largely ignored by the hip-hop community. That same month, Vibe reported that The Ecstatic had been withdrawn from streaming services. "The ownership of that album has come out of the hands of the corporation that owned it, previously. That's why it's not there anymore", the rapper explained. "But there's still opportunities for people to hear it in other mediums, and the team is putting those things together." The album was reissued by Rhymesayers Entertainment in 2026, with streaming exclusive to Qobuz and vinyl records set to release in August 2026.

== Track listing ==
Credits are adapted from Downtown Music.

The Ecstatic track listing
No.	Title	Writer(s)	Producer(s)	Length
1.	"Supermagic"	Dante Smith; Michael Jackson	Oh No	2:32
2.	"Twilite Speedball"	Smith; Chad Hugo	The Neptunes; Mos Def	3:02
3.	"Auditorium" (featuring Slick Rick)	Smith; Otis Jackson Jr.; Richard Walters	Madlib; Mos Def	4:34
4.	"Wahid"	Smith; O. Jackson	Madlib	1:39
5.	"Priority"	Smith; Jean Daval	Preservation	1:22
6.	"Quiet Dog Bite Hard"	Smith; Daval	Preservation	2:57
7.	"Life in Marvelous Times"	Smith; Gilles Bousquet	Mr. Flash	3:41
8.	"The Embassy"	Smith; Bousquet; Ihsan al Munzer	Mr. Flash; Mos Def	2:45
9.	"No Hay Nada Mas"	Smith; Daval	Preservation	1:42
10.	"Pistola"	Smith; M. Jackson; Anthony Hester	Oh No	3:02
11.	"Pretty Dancer"	Smith; O. Jackson	Madlib	3:31
12.	"Workers Comp."	Smith; Bousquet; Marvin Gaye	Mr. Flash	2:02
13.	"Revelations"	Smith; O. Jackson; Michael Drake	Madlib	2:03
14.	"Roses" (featuring Georgia Anne Muldrow)	Smith; Georgia Anne Muldrow	Georgia Anne Muldrow	3:41
15.	"History" (featuring Talib Kweli)	Smith; James Yancey; Talib K. Greene; Zekkariyas; Mary Wells Womack	J Dilla	2:21
16.	"Casa Bey"	Smith; Eduardo Lobo	Preservation; Mos Def (Note: No producers are listed for "Casa Bey" in the official album credits, although DJBooth reported that Preservation and Mos Def had produced the song.)	4:32

Sample credits

- "Supermagic" contains a sample of "Ince Ince" by Selda Bağcan.
- "Priority" contains elements from "Flower" by Bobby Hebb.
- "Quiet Dog Bite Hard" contains portions of an interview with Fela Kuti from the documentary film Music Is the Weapon.
- "Auditorium" contains samples of "Do Jhoot Jiye Ek Sach Ke Liye", performed by Lata Mangeshkar and "Hey Raju Hey Daddy", performed by S. P. Balasubrahmanyam and Rajeshwari Dutta.
- "The Embassy" contains a sample of "The Joy of Lina" by Ihsan al Munzer.
- "Pistola" contains elements from "In the Rain" by Billy Wooten.
- "Workers Comp." contains a sample of "If This World Were Mine" by Marvin Gaye.
- "Revelations" contains portions of "Colours" by Michael Drake.
- "History" contains a sample of "Two Lovers History" by Mary Wells.
- "Casa Bey" contains a sample of "Casa Forte" by Banda Black Rio.

== Personnel ==
Credits are adapted from Downtown Music.

- Fernando Aponte – engineering
- Danny Betancourt – engineering
- Josh Blair – additional vocal engineering
- Matt De Sando – additional vocal engineering
- Sayyd Droullard – additional engineering
- Jan Fairchild – engineering, mixing
- Josh Grant – additional engineering
- Bernie Grundman – mastering
- Zach Hancock – additional engineering
- Myron Kingsbury – assistant engineering
- Talib Kweli – vocals
- Georgia Anne Muldrow – engineering, piano, production, vocals
- The Neptunes – production
- Madlib – production
- Mos Def – arrangement, production, vocals
- Mr. Flash – production
- Oh No – production
- Preservation – arrangement, production
- Slick Rick – vocals
- Ben Yonas – additional vocal engineering

== Charts ==
=== Weekly charts ===
Chart performance for The Ecstatic
Chart (2009)	Peak position
Australian Albums (ARIA)	91
Canadian Albums (Billboard)	24
French Albums (SNEP)	172
Swiss Albums (Schweizer Hitparade)	90
US Billboard 200	9
US Top R&B/Hip-Hop Albums (Billboard)	5

Chart (2026)	Peak position
Australian Albums (ARIA)	86
German Albums (Offizielle Top 100)	50
German Hip-Hop Albums (Offizielle Top 100)	10

=== Year-end charts ===
2009 year-end chart performance for The Ecstatic
Chart (2009)	Position
US Top R&B/Hip-Hop Albums (Billboard)	98

== See also ==
- 2009 in hip-hop
- Madlib discography
- Mos Def discography
- Progressive rap

== Bibliography ==
- Aaron, Charles (2009). "The SPIN Interview: Mos Def". Spin. Vol. 25, no. 8.
- Anon. (2009a). "House Music: Mos Def". Interview. Archived from the original on September 13, 2016.
- Anon. (2009b). "Mos Def Clips 'Roses' From Up-And-Coming Singer". The Urban Daily. Archived from the original on July 1, 2016.
- Anon. (2009c). "Critics' poll 2009: Albums 11 - 50". The Guardian.
- Anon. (2009d). "The 25 Best Albums of 2009". Rolling Stone. Archived from the original on March 23, 2010.
- Anon. (2009e). "The 25 Best Albums & Singles of 2009". Slant Magazine.
- Anon. (2009f). "The 60 Best Albums of 2009". PopMatters.
- Anon. (2009g). "Relevant's Best Albums of 2009". Relevant. Archived from the original on February 17, 2010.
- Anon. (2009h). "Best Albums of 2009". eMusic. Archived from the original on January 7, 2010.
- Anon. (2009i). "Staff Picks: Top Albums of 2009". Sputnikmusic.
- Anon. (2009j). "Pazz & Jop 2009". The Village Voice. Archived from the original on February 19, 2010.
- Anon. (2009k). "Very Noughtie: RBP's Best Albums, 2000-2009. By Various Writers". Rock's Backpages.
- Anon. (2009l). "The 100 best pop albums of the Noughties". The Times.
- Anon. (2010a). "Mos Def Announces Australian Tour". Triple J. Archived from the original on May 8, 2016.
- Anon. (2010b). "Mos Def – Ecstatic Moments photographs by Cognito". HVW8.
- Anon. (2015). "X Gon' Give It To Ya: Five Rap Songs That Shine Light On Malcolm X's Brilliance". Vibe. Archived from the original on August 16, 2016.
- Anon. (2016). "Yasiin Bey (Mos Def)". The New Yorker.
- Anon.[a] (n.d.). "The 100 Best Hip-Hop Albums of the 2000s". About.com. Archived from the original on July 1, 2016.
- Anon.[c] (n.d.). "Casa Bey – Mos Def". AllMusic. Archived from the original on September 28, 2016.
- Anon.[d] (n.d.). "Quiet Dog – Mos Def". AllMusic. Archived from the original on September 28, 2016.
- Anon.[e] (n.d.). "The Ecstatic by Mos Def reviews". AnyDecentMusic?.
- Anon.[f] (n.d.). "Mos Def – The Ecstatic". Downtown Music. Archived from the original on June 24, 2009.
- Anon.[g] (n.d.). "Mos Def – The Ecstatic". Hung Medien. Archived from the original on September 10, 2016.
- Anon.[h] (n.d.). "Reviews for The Ecstatic by Mos Def". Metacritic. Archived from the original on February 21, 2016.
- Anon.[i] (June 29, 2009). "Week Commencing 29th June 2009" (PDF). The ARIA Report (1009). Australian Recording Industry Association. Archived from the original (PDF) on September 2, 2009 – via Pandora Archive.
- Anon.[j] (n.d.). "Top R&B/Hip-Hop Albums – Year-End 2009". Billboard.
- Baker, Soren (2014). "50 Cent Leaves Interscope: How Nas, Busta Rhymes, Ghostface Killah & Mos Def Fared After Leaving Their Longtime Label Homes". HipHopDX. Archived from the original on March 11, 2016.
- Balfour, Jay (2013). "Yasiin Bey (Mos Def) & Preservation Release 'The REcstatic' Remix Album". HipHopDX. Archived from the original on June 16, 2016.
- Bronson, Kevin (August 21, 2009). "Ecstatic and Inspired, Mos Def Does It Again". MusicWorld. Broadcast Music, Inc..
- Byrne, Niall (2009). "Mos Def – The Ecstatic". State. Archived from the original on August 7, 2016.
- Carroll, Jim (2009). "Mos Def". The Irish Times. Archived from the original on August 5, 2016.
- Caulfield, Keith (2009). "Black Eyed Peas 'E.N.D.' Up At No. 1 On Billboard 200". Billboard. Archived from the original on May 26, 2016.
- Chennault, Sam (2009). "100 Best Albums of the Decade, 21-30". Rhapsody. Archived from the original on December 15, 2009.
- Christgau, Robert (2009). "Consumer Guide". MSN Music.
- Christgau, Robert (2010). "The Dean's List: The Best Albums of 2009". The Barnes & Noble Review. Archived from the original on August 6, 2020.
- Dantana (2009). "Updated: Mos Def Presents The Ecstatic Tour ft Jay Electronica". Okayplayer. Archived from the original on August 4, 2016.
- Daulatzai, Sohail (2012). Black Star, Crescent Moon: The Muslim International and Black Freedom Beyond America. U of Minnesota Press. ISBN 978-0816675869.
- Diamond, Samuel (2013). "Yasiin Bey & Preservation – The REcstatic". Tiny Mix Tapes. Archived from the original on August 8, 2016.
- Diver, Mike (2010). "BBC Music's Best Albums of 2009". BBC.
- Ducker, Jesse (June 8, 2019). "Revisiting Mos Def's 'The Ecstatic' (2009)". Albumism.
- Eisinger, Dale (2013). "The Ecstatic – The 50 Best Rap Album Covers of the Past Five Years". Complex. Archived from the original on June 19, 2016.
- Faughnder, Ryan (2009). "Top 50 Albums of 2009 (Part One)". No Ripcord. Archived from the original on April 15, 2016.
- Fennessey, Sean (January–February 2010). "40 Best Albums of 2009". Spin. New York. p. 33. ISSN 0886-3032 – via Google Books.
- Ford, Winston "Stone" (February 2010). "Interview: Cognito, Mos Def's Documentiarian and curator of Ecstatic Moments". The Couch Sessions.
- Gundersen, Edna (2009). "Mos Def is Most Thoughtful as He Focuses on Myriad Projects". USA Today. Archived from the original on February 5, 2016.
- Harling, Danielle (2009). "Drake, Mos Def And More Receive Grammy Nominations". HipHopDX. Archived from the original on March 10, 2016.
- Henderson, Eric (2009). "Mos Def: The Ecstatic". Slant Magazine. Archived from the original on June 23, 2013.
- Hoard, Christian (2009). "The Ecstatic : Mos Def : Review". Rolling Stone. Archived from the original on June 17, 2009.
- Huff, Quentin B. (2009). "Hip-Hop & the Contrast Principle". PopMatters. Archived from the original on August 6, 2016.
- Iles, Matthew (September 14, 2009). "Woodstock and sports: Page 2 connects the dots between 1969 and 2009". ESPN.com.
- Jones, Steve (2009). "'Ecstatic' Elevates Def's Game". USA Today. Archived from the original on September 24, 2016.
- Kellman, Andy (n.d.). "The Ecstatic – Mos Def". AllMusic. Archived from the original on March 27, 2013.
- Ketchum III, William E. (November 27, 2019). "Yasiin Bey Talks 'Negus,' Visual Art, And Unreleased Music". Vibe.
- Keyes, J. Edward (September 30, 2009). "Austin City Limits 2009: Ultimate Schedule Guide". Rolling Stone. Archived from the original on September 1, 2018.
- Kot, Greg (2009). "Turn It Up: Album Review: Mos Def's 'The Ecstatic'". Chicago Tribune. Archived from the original on March 9, 2012.
- Lamb, Karas (2013). "Yasiin Bey & Preservation Present: 'The REcstatic'". Okayplayer.
- MacInnes, Paul (2009). "Mos Def: The Ecstatic". The Guardian. Archived from the original on April 22, 2010.
- Maness, Carter (2009). "Current TV Follows Mos Def Around Japan". The Boombox. Archived from the original on July 1, 2016.
- Michaels, Sean (2009). "Mos Def to Release New Album … on a T-shirt". The Guardian. Archived from the original on August 11, 2016.
- Middles, Mick (2009). "Mos Def". The Quietus.
- Murray, Robin (2010). "Mos Def Unveils UK Tour". Clash. Archived from the original on June 25, 2016.
- Owsinski, Bobby (2009). Music 3.0: A Survival Guide for Making Music in the Internet Age. Hal Leonard Corporation. ISBN 978-1423474012.
- Patrin, Nate (May 14, 2009). "'Casa Bey' by Mos Def Review". Pitchfork.
- Patrin, Nate (June 10, 2009). "Mos Def: The Ecstatic". Pitchfork. Archived from the original on April 15, 2013.
- Potton, Ed (2009). "Mos Def: The Ecstatic". The Times. Archived from the original on March 3, 2012.(subscription required)
- Rabin, Nathan (2009). "Mos Def: The Ecstatic". The A.V. Club. Archived from the original on January 7, 2011.
- Raible, Allan (2009). "Review: Mos Def's 'The Ecstatic'". ABC News. Archived from the original on August 7, 2016.
- Richman, Simmy (2009). "Album: Mos Def, The Ecstatic (Downtown)". The Independent. Archived from the original on August 29, 2014.
- Samuel, Steven (2008). "Mos Def 'Ecstatic' About Upcoming CD". SOHH. Archived from the original on August 4, 2016.
- Samuel, Steven (2009). "Mos Def Reveals New Album Details, Bringing Back Def Poetry". SOHH. Archived from the original on August 4, 2016.
- Sawdey, Evan (August 2021). "Music artists who walked away at the top of their game". Yardbarker.
- Siehndel, Patrick; Abel, Fabian; Diaz-Aviles, Ernesto; Henze, Nicola; Krause, Daniel (2013). "Cross-Domain Analysis of the Blogosphere for Trend Prediction". In Özyer, Tansel; Rokne, Jon; Wagner, Gerhard; Reuser, Arno H. P. (eds.). The Influence of Technology on Social Network Analysis and Mining. Springer Science & Business Media. ISBN 978-3709113462.
- Slavik, Nathan (2009). "Mos Def – The Ecstatic". DJBooth. Archived from the original on August 8, 2016.
- Spadine, Richard (2009). "Mos Def – Casa Bey". DJBooth. Archived from the original on October 24, 2016.
- St. John, Colin (2009). "Review: Mos Def". Time Out. Archived from the original on September 18, 2016.
- Stewart, Allison (2009). "Music Review: Black Eyed Peas' 'The E.N.D.'; Mos Def's 'The Ecstatic'". The Washington Post. Archived from the original on March 3, 2016.
- Stosuy, Brandon (2009). "Q's 50 Best Albums Of 2009". Stereogum. Archived from the original on February 13, 2021.
- Sundaresan, Mano (February 5, 2020). "The Paradox of Yasiin Bey's 'Negus,' A Rap Album Trapped in an Art Museum". NPR Music.
- Thompson, Ben (2009). "CD: Pop Review: Mos Def, The Ecstatic". The Observer. Archived from the original on April 22, 2010.
- Tyrangiel, Josh (May 18, 2009). "Mos Def's The Ecstatic – Summer Arts Preview". Time.
- Vozick-Levinson, Simon (2009). "The Ecstatic". Entertainment Weekly. Archived from the original on March 13, 2016.
- Wappler, Margaret (June 9, 2009). "Album review: Mos Def's 'The Ecstatic'". Pop & Hiss.
- Young, Alex (2009). "Mos Def – The Ecstatic". Consequence of Sound. Archived from the original on August 8, 2016.
- Zercoe, Cole (2013). "BPM 5: The Top 130 Albums". Beats Per Minute.
