= Ms. Fat Booty =

Single by Mos Def

from the album Black on Both Sides
- B-side: "Mathematics"
- Released: August 2, 1999
- Genre: Hip hop
- Length: 4:08
- Label: Rawkus
- Songwriters: Dante Smith; Lamont Dorrell
- Producer: Ayatollah

Music video
- "Ms. Fat Booty" on YouTube

"Ms. Fat Booty" is a song by American rapper Mos Def. It was released on August 2, 1999 through Rawkus Records, as the lead single from the musician's debut solo studio album Black on Both Sides. Production was handled by Ayatollah, who used multiple samples of Aretha Franklin's 1965 single "One Step Ahead".

The song peaked at number 84 on the Dutch Single Top 100 and number 85 on the UK Singles Chart. In 2010, it was placed at #144 on Pitchfork's "The Top 200 Tracks of the 1990s" list.

It also appears on MTV Classic's 90's Nation and Yo! Hip Hop Mix.

The song's sequel, "Ms. Fat Booty 2" featuring Ghostface Killah, was featured in 2000 compilation album Lyricist Lounge 2.

== Track listing ==
No.	Title	Writer(s)	Producer(s)	Length
1.	"Ms. Fat Booty" (Clean)	Dante Smith; Lamont Dorrell	Ayatollah
2.	"Ms. Fat Booty" (Dirty)	Smith; Dorrell	Ayatollah
3.	"Ms. Fat Booty" (Instrumental)	Smith; Dorrell	Ayatollah
4.	"Ms. Fat Booty" (A Cappella)	Smith; Dorrell	Ayatollah
5.	"Mathematics" (Clean)	Smith; Christopher Martin	DJ Premier
6.	"Mathematics" (Dirty)	Smith; Martin	DJ Premier
7.	"Mathematics" (Instrumental)	Smith; Martin	DJ Premier
8.	"Mathematics" (A Cappella)	Smith; Martin	DJ Premier

== Charts ==
Chart performance for "Ms. Fat Booty"
Chart (1999–2000)	Peak position
Netherlands (Single Top 100)	84
UK Singles (Official Charts)	85
US Hot R&B/Hip-Hop Songs (Billboard)	54
US Hot Rap Songs (Billboard)	20
