= Black Star (group) =

American hip hop duo

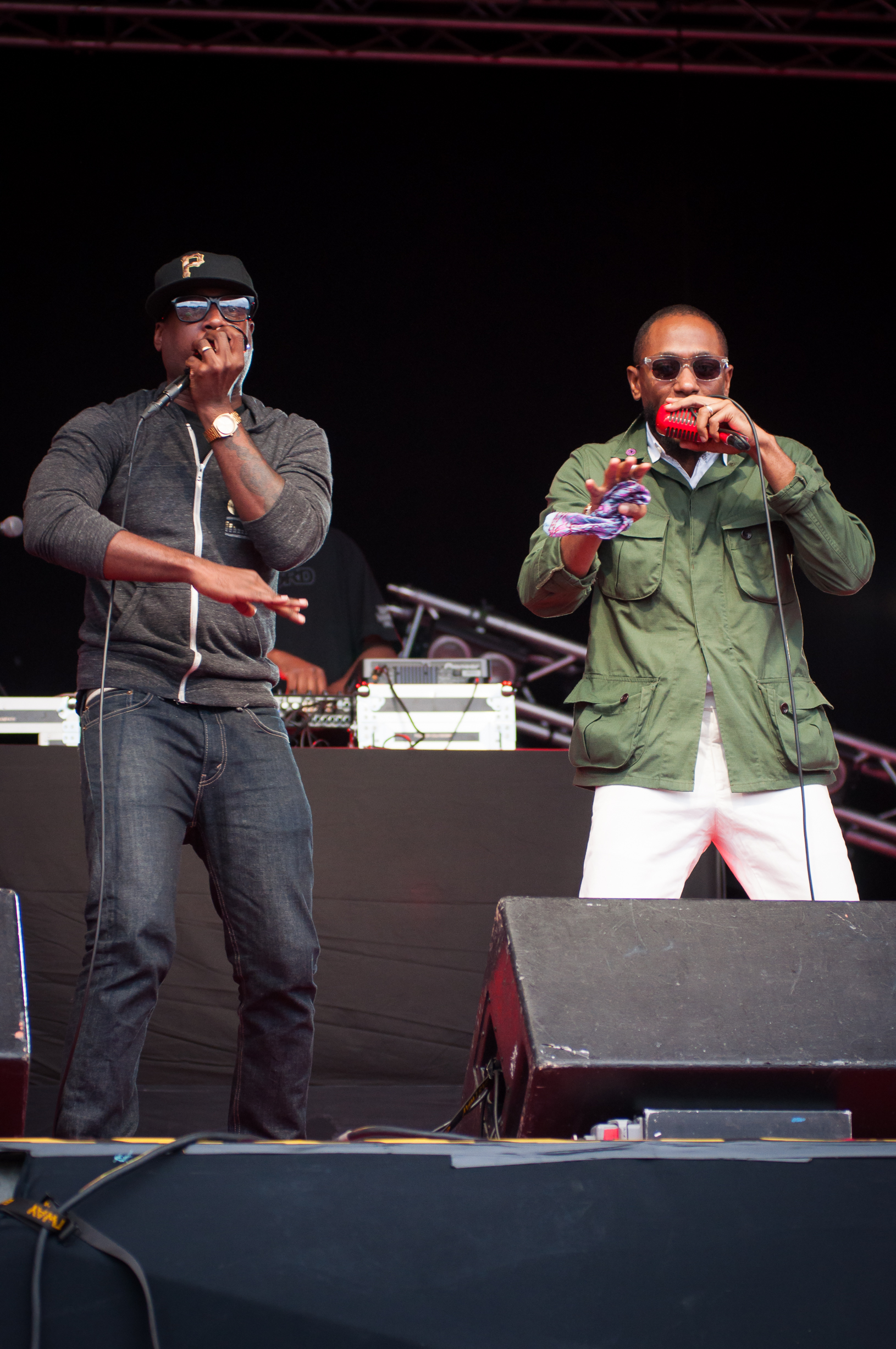
- Members Kweli (left) and Yasiin Bey performing at the 2012 Ilosaarirock festival

Background information
- Origin: Brooklyn, New York City, U.S.
- Genres: Jazz rap; East Coast hip-hop; alternative hip-hop
- Years active: 1996–present
- Labels: Javotti; Rawkus; EMI; Priority
- Spinoff of: Soulquarians
- Members: Yasiin Bey; Talib Kweli

Black Star is an American hip hop duo from Brooklyn, New York. Formed in 1996, the duo is composed of rappers Yasiin Bey (formerly known as Mos Def) and Talib Kweli. The duo is named after The Black Star Line, a shipping company founded by Marcus Garvey. Their critically acclaimed debut album, Mos Def & Talib Kweli Are Black Star, was released on September 29, 1998. After decades of only releasing singles and appearing on compilations, Black Star released their sophomore studio album, No Fear of Time, May 3, 2022 on the podcasting platform Luminary.

== History ==
Black Star arose from the underground movement of the late 1990s, which was in large part due to Rawkus Records, an independent record label stationed in New York City. They, together with other members of the Native Tongues Posse, helped shape underground alternative rap, bringing it into the mainstream. Both Yasiin Bey and Talib Kweli have gone on to greater commercial and critical success in their solo careers.

In 2001, Black Star performed "Money Jungle" with Ron Carter and John Patton for the Red Hot Organization's compilation album Red Hot + Indigo, a tribute to Duke Ellington, which raised money for various charities devoted to increasing AIDS awareness and fighting the disease. In 2002, the song "Hater Players" was used in an episode of The Wire, "The Cost". In 2005, hip hop website TheSituation.co.uk reported Kweli said that a new Black Star album was "in the pipeline".

A second album, to be produced entirely by Madlib, was confirmed to be finished in November 2019. It was announced in 2022 that the album would be titled No Fear of Time. It was released on May 3 exclusively on the podcast platform Luminary. On June 20, 2023, the album was released on Bandcamp.

The group performed twice live on Saturday Night Live, Season 48, Episode 6, hosted by Dave Chappelle, on November 12, 2022.

== Discography ==
=== Studio albums ===
List of albums, with selected chart positions
Title	Album details	Peak chart positions		
Title	Album details	US	US R&B	US Rap
Mos Def & Talib Kweli Are Black Star	Released: September 29, 1998 (US); Label: Rawkus, Priority, EMI; Format: CD, LP, cassette, digital download	53	13	—
No Fear of Time	Released: May 3, 2022 (US); Label: self-released; Format: streaming (podcast), digital download (Bandcamp)	—	—	—
"—" denotes a recording that did not chart or was not released in that territory.

=== Singles ===
List of singles, with selected chart positions, showing year released and album name
Title	Year	Peak chart positions				Album
Title	Year	US	US R&B	US Rap	CAN	Album
"Definition"	1998	60	31	3	—	Mos Def & Talib Kweli Are Black Star
"Respiration" (featuring Common)	1999	—	54	6	—	Mos Def & Talib Kweli Are Black Star
"One Four Love Pt. 1" (featuring Common, Kool G Rap, Pharoahe Monch, Posdnuos, Rah Digga, Shabaam Sahdeeq, and Sporty Thievz)	1999	—	55	4	6	Hip Hop for Respect EP
"Fix Up"	2011	—	—	—	—	Non-album single
"—" denotes a title that did not chart, or was not released in that territory.

=== Other collaborations ===
- 1997: "Fortified Live", "Freestyle" from the Rawkus Compilation Soundbombing
- 1998: "Another World" from the 7"
- 1999: "The Hard Margin" from The Creators 12"
- ~~~~: "Know That" from the Mos Def album Black on Both Sides
- ~~~~: "Beautiful" (Black Star remix) from the B-side for the Mary J. Blige song "All That I Can Say"
- ~~~~: "High Drama Pt. 3" (Ambvalence Remix) from the Mike Zoot 12"
- 2000: "Little Brother" from the soundtrack for The Hurricane
- ~~~~: "Lyrical Fluctuation 2000 (Spinna Mix)" from the Jigmastas album Grassroots: the Prologue
- ~~~~: "This Means You" from the Reflection Eternal album Train of Thought
- 2001: "Money Jungle" from the Red Hot Organization album Red Hot + Indigo
- 2002: "Joy" from the Talib Kweli album Quality
- ~~~~: "Get By" (Remix) from the Talib Kweli single
- ~~~~: "Brown Sugar (Raw)" from the soundtrack for Brown Sugar
- 2005: "Supreme Supreme" from the Talib Kweli mixtape Right About Now
- ~~~~: "Bright As the Stars" from the Mos Def single "Ah Ha"
- 2006: "Born & Raised" from the soundtrack for Dave Chappelle's Block Party
- 2009: "History" from the Mos Def album The Ecstatic
- 2010: "Just Begun" from the Reflection Eternal album Revolutions per Minute
- 2011: "You Already Knew" from Black Star Aretha, the two's tribute to Aretha Franklin
- 2022: "Peppas" from the Westside Gunn mixtape 10
