= Mathematics (Mos Def song) =

Single by Mos Def

from the album Black on Both Sides
- A-side: "Ms. Fat Booty"
- Released: August 2, 1999
- Genre: Conscious hip-hop
- Length: 4:10
- Label: Rawkus
- Songwriter(s): Dante Smith; Christopher Martin
- Producer(s): DJ Premier

Mos Def singles chronology
"Ms. Fat Booty" (1999)	"Mathematics" (1999)	"Sex, Love & Money" (2004)

"Mathematics" is a b-side single from Mos Def's solo debut album, Black on Both Sides. It contains lyrics about various social issues and asks the listener to add them up and come to conclusions about them. Many references to numbers are found in this song and at times, Mos Def rhymes statistics in numerical order.

== Background ==
The song highlights the differences between the White and African-American citizens of the US and uses the lyrics "Do your math..." - telling young African-Americans to 'do their maths' so they can avoid being part of the numerous degrading statistics he raps about in the opening and third verses of the song. The song is produced by DJ Premier whose famous scratch samples make up the song's bridge. Premier has called it one of his favorite beats.

Premier also revealed that Scarface originally wanted the beat. He was recording his album The Last of a Dying Breed and wanted Premier to produce a song on it. However, Mos Def took the track and recorded something to it. Scarface later met up with Mos Def to tell him that he really wanted the track.

== Samples ==
The bridge of "Mathematics" contains DJ Premier's signature scratched vocals from various hip hop songs. The lyrics of those samples as well as information about their origin can be found below:

"The Mighty Mos Def..." (from Mos Def's "Body Rock"),
"It's simple mathematics" (from Fat Joe's "John Blaze"),
"Check it out" (from "Look Alive" by Big C from Arista Records)
"I revolve around science..." (Ghostface Killah's vocals from Raekwon's "Criminology"),
"What are we talking about here?" (Art Seigner of Flying Dutchman Records interviewing Angela Davis),
"Do your math.." (from Erykah Badu's "On & On"), and
"One, two, three, four" (from James Brown's "Funky Drummer")

The instrumental from "Baby I'm-a Want You" by The Fatback Band is also sampled.

== In popular culture ==
"Mathematics" can be found on the soundtrack of Madden NFL 2002. The song is also played briefly in the CSI: Crime Scene Investigation episode "Crate 'n' Burial".

== Single track list ==
=== Vinyl 12" ===
A-Side

1. Ms. Fat Booty (Clean)
2. Ms. Fat Booty (Dirty)
3. Ms. Fat Booty (Instrumental)
4. Ms. Fat Booty (A Capella)

B-Side

1. Mathematics (Clean)
2. Mathematics (Dirty)
3. Mathematics (Instrumental)
4. Mathematics (A Capella)

=== CD/Maxi single ===
1. Ms. Fat Booty (4:08)
2. Ms. Fat Booty (Instrumental) (4:06)
3. Mathematics (4:08)
