= True Magic =

Studio album by Mos Def
- Released: December 29, 2006
- Genre: Alternative hip-hop
- Length: 52:37
- Label: Geffen
- Producers: The Neptunes; Rich Harrison; DJ Khalil; Minnesota; Preservation; Mos Def

Mos Def chronology
The New Danger (2004)	True Magic (2006)	The Ecstatic (2009)

True Magic is the third studio album by American rapper Mos Def, released on December 29, 2006, by Geffen Records. After Geffen had absorbed Mos Def's former label Rawkus, the album was released haphazardly to fulfill a contractual obligation; its physical release lacked a booklet, cover art, lyrics, or credits.

Following an internet leak, True Magic was released to mostly mixed reviews from critics, and has sold over 97,000 copies by 2014.

== Background ==
True Magic was released to fulfill Mos Def's contract with Geffen Records. It featured production from The Neptunes, Rich Harrison and Minnesota, among others. The song "Crime & Medicine" samples GZA's 1995 single "Liquid Swords", while the song "Dollar Day" uses the same beat as Juvenile's "Nolia Clap".

== Release and reception ==
Professional ratings
Aggregate scores
Source	Rating
Metacritic	45/100
Review scores
Source	Rating
About.com	3.5/5 stars
AllMusic	2/5 stars
Boston Herald	A−
Entertainment Weekly	C+
HipHopDX	3/5
Now	4/5
Pitchfork Media	4.5/10
Stylus Magazine	D
Tiny Mix Tapes	3.5/5 marks
Winnipeg Sun	3.5/5 stars

Following an online leak of the album, True Magic was released by Geffen in a clear plastic case without a booklet, cover art, lyrics, or credits. Geffen re-released it several months later with complete artwork and a slightly altered track order.

True Magic received generally mixed reviews from critics; it holds an aggregate score of 45 out of 100 at Metacritic. AllMusic's Andy Kellman called it "a disappointment" with "just enough quality material ('Dollar Day,' 'Fake Bonanza,' 'There Is a Way') to make the average fan not want to wipe the whole thing from memory, but the flashes of brilliance are all too scarce." New York Times critic Nate Chinen said the music sounded as if it had been produced "on the cheap" and that some songs carried "urgent messages upfront, but not much depth within". Mos Def "may deliver tantalizing flashes of lyrical skill, but he doesn't inspire much feeling other than listless dread", Chinen wrote. Michael Furman from Tiny Mix Tapes was more enthusiastic about the album, writing that "it's not a happy record, and there are few, if any, genius rhymes. But it speaks volumes about the frustration and resignation of the underprivileged." Its single, "Undeniable", was nominated for the 2007 Grammy Award for Best Rap Solo Performance. By March 2014, True Magic had sold 97,000 copies in the United States.

== Track listing ==
No.	Title	Producer(s)	Length
1.	"True Magic"	DJ Epik; Mark Knoxx	2:51
2.	"Undeniable"	Rich Harrison	4:16
3.	"U R the One"	Minnesota	3:58
4.	"Thug Is a Drug"	Minnesota	2:52
5.	"Crime & Medicine"	Mos Def	3:08
6.	"A Ha"	Minnesota	2:35
7.	"Dollar Day"	DJ Khalil	5:14
8.	"Napoleon Dynamite"	Preservation	2:01
9.	"There Is a Way"	Preservation	3:27
10.	"Sun, Moon, Stars"	Preservation	4:39
11.	"Murder of a Teenage Life"	The Neptunes	3:25
12.	"Fake Bonanza"	Preservation	4:11
13.	"Perfect Timing"	Mos Def	4:14
14.	"Lifetime"	Preservation	5:47

== Charts ==
Chart (2006)	Peak position
US Billboard 200	77
US Billboard Top R&B/Hip-Hop Albums	25
US Billboard Top Rap Albums	12
