= Sex, Love & Money =

Single by Mos Def

Single by Mos Def

from the album The New Danger
- B-side: "Ghetto Rock"
- Released: September 28, 2004
- Genre: Hip hop
- Length: 4:09
- Label: Geffen Records
- Songwriter(s): W. Campbell, D. Smith
- Producer(s): Warryn Campbell

Mos Def singles chronology
"Get By (Remix)" (2003)	"Sex, Love & Money" (2004)	"Close Edge" (2004)

"Sex, Love & Money" is a single by rapper Mos Def, released as the lead single from his second album, The New Danger. The video was directed by Paul Hunter. It was nominated for a Grammy Award, and reached the Billboard Hot R&B/Hip-Hop Songs chart.

== Single tracklist ==
=== A-Side ===
1. Sex, Love & Money (Radio) (3:48)
2. Sex, Love & Money (Instrumental) (4:09)
3. Sex, Love & Money (LP Version) (4:09)

=== B-Side ===
1. Ghetto Rock (Radio) (3:35)
2. Ghetto Rock (Instrumental) (3:52)
3. Ghetto Rock (LP Version) (3:53)
