= No Fear of Time =

Studio album by Black Star
- Released: May 3, 2022
- Recorded: 2019–2022
- Genre: Hip-hop
- Length: 33:00
- Labels: Luminary; Rhymesayers (physical)
- Producer: Madlib

Black Star chronology
Mos Def & Talib Kweli Are Black Star (1998)	No Fear of Time (2022)

No Fear of Time is the second studio album by American hip-hop duo Black Star, composed of rappers Yasiin Bey and Talib Kweli. It was released on May 3, 2022, via podcasting network Luminary. Entirely produced by Madlib, the album marks the duo's first full-length release in 24 years, following 1998's Mos Def & Talib Kweli Are Black Star.

== Background ==
In 1998, rappers Yasiin Bey (then known as Mos Def) and Talib Kweli formed the duo Black Star, releasing their debut album Mos Def & Talib Kweli Are Black Star that same year to critical acclaim. Since then, the duo went on to have greater success in their respective solo careers; while also making occasional film soundtrack/compilation appearances including The Hurricane cut "Little Brother".

In 2005, hip-hop website TheSituation.co.uk reported Kweli said that a new Black Star album was "in the pipeline". In November 2011, Black Star released two new singles entitled "Fix Up" (produced by Madlib) and "You Already Knew" (produced by Oh No), the latter of which was the lead single for a planned Aretha Franklin tribute mixtape entitled Black Star Aretha. Eight years later, it was announced that a second album by Black Star was to be produced entirely by Madlib, and was confirmed to be finished in November.

== Release and promotion ==
On April 8, 2022, Black Star officially announced that their highly anticipated second album would be titled No Fear of Time, with a scheduled release of May 3 exclusively on the podcast platform Luminary. It was also revealed in a press release by Talib Kweli that the album was recorded over a span of four years in hotel rooms and backstage at Dave Chappelle's shows.

The day after the album's announcement, the duo released a Black Thought-assisted promotional single entitled "Mineral Mountain", which used Madlib's "The New Normal" instrumental from the Sound Ancestors album.

On November 12, 2022, the duo performed "So Be It" and "The Main Thing is to Keep the Main Thing the Main Thing" on Saturday Night Live.

In 2023, the album was made available on physical format through Rhymesayers Entertainment.

== Critical reception ==
Professional ratings
Review scores
Source	Rating
Exclaim!	7/10
HipHopDX	3.9/5 stars
Pitchfork	6.2/10
Rolling Stone	4/5 stars

No Fear of Time received generally positive reviews from music critics. Metacritic, a review aggregator website, assigned the album an average score of 79 out of 100, based on five professional reviews. Exclaim! writer Kyle Mullin awarded the album a score of 7/10, noting that Black Star showcased "glimpses of their backpack brilliance" on No Fear of Time. He praised the production and lyrical content, highlighting the duo's growth since their debut.

HipHopDX contributor Riley Wallace gave the album a score of 3.9/5, suggesting that No Fear of Time was almost worth the long wait. He praised the chemistry between Yasiin Bey and Talib Kweli, as well as Madlib's production, while also acknowledging that the album might not satisfy all fans. Dylan Green of Pitchfork gave the album a score of 6.2/10, describing it as a mixed bag. He praised the duo's lyrical abilities but noted that the production occasionally overshadowed their verses, resulting in an imbalanced listening experience. Rolling Stone critic Will Dukes gave the album 4 out of 5 stars, emphasizing that Black Star sounded searingly relevant on their first album in twenty-four years. Dukes praised the thematic depth of the lyrics and the chemistry between Bey and Kweli, suggesting that the album was a significant addition to their catalog.

== Track listing ==
All songs are produced by Madlib.

No Fear of Time track listing
No.	Title	Writer(s)	Length
1.	"o.G."	Yasiin Bey; Talib Kweli Greene; Otis Jackson, Jr.; Francis Stark; Gregory Isaacs	3:56
2.	"So Be It"	Bey; Greene; Jackson; Kalyanji Shah; Anandji Shah	4:08
3.	"Sweetheart. Sweethard. Sweetodd"	Bey; Greene; Jackson; Cornelius Cade; Jamal Nubi	2:10
4.	"My Favorite Band"	Bey; Jackson; Gregory Magee	2:08
5.	"The Main Thing is to Keep the Main Thing the Main Thing"	Bey; Greene; Jackson	3:51
6.	"Yonders"	Bey; Greene; Jackson	2:40
7.	"Supreme Alchemy"	Greene; Jackson; Phil Silverberg	2:13
8.	"Freequency" (with Black Thought)	Bey; Greene; Jackson; Tariq Trotter	6:53
9.	"No Fear of Time" (with Yummy Bingham)	Bey; Greene; Jackson	5:01
Total length:			33:00

Notes

- Tracks 2, 4, 5, 7, and 9 are stylized in sentence case. For example, "So Be It" is stylized as "So be it".
- On the Bandcamp release, track 5 is stylized in lowercase.
- All guest appearances are written without parentheses, and annotated by the letter "w" (abbreviation of "with"). For example, "'Freequency' (with Black Thought)" is written as "Freequency w Black Thought".

Sample credits

- "o.G" contains excerpts from "No Easy Game", written by Francis Stark, and performed by PJ; and "The Ruler", written and performed by Gregory Isaacs.
- "So Be It" samples a portion of "Theme From Don", composed by Kalyanji–Anandji.
- "Sweetheart. Sweet hard. Sweet odd" contains a sample of "Let Us", written by Cornelius Cade and Jamal Nubi, and performed by Edge of Daybreak.
- "My Favorite Band" contains a sample of "So Good To Have You Home Again", written by Gregory Magee, and performed by the Mystiques.
- "Supreme Alchemy" contains excerpts from "Dream State", written by Phil Silverberg, and performed by LoPhi.
- "Frequency" contains excerpts from "Slow Walking", written and performed by Jon Faddis.
- "No Fear Of Time" contains a sample of Greg Tate being interviewed on the podcast Touré Show, hosted by Touré.

== Personnel ==
- Yasiin Bey – vocals (all tracks except 7)
- Talib Kweli – vocals (all tracks except 4)
- Madlib – production (all tracks)
- Jairo Valentino – additional vocals (track 1)
- Federico "C Sik" Lopez – recording engineer, mixing engineer (all tracks)
- Yummy Bingham – additional vocals (track 9)
- Isaiah Gage – cello, string arrangement (track 9)
- Mike Bozzi – mastering engineer
- Donna Dragotta – A&R
