= The New Danger =

Studio album by Mos Def
- Released: October 12, 2004
- Recorded: 2003–04
- Genre: Hip hop; psychedelic soul
- Length: 74:51
- Label: Rawkus; Geffen
- Producer: Mos Def; Easy Mo Bee; Kanye West; 88-Keys; Minnesota; Warryn Campbell; Psycho Les

Mos Def chronology
Black on Both Sides (1999)	The New Danger (2004)	True Magic (2006)

The New Danger is the second studio album by American rapper Mos Def, released on October 12, 2004, by Rawkus and Geffen Records. It is the follow-up to his breakthrough solo effort Black on Both Sides (1999), after which he devoted more time into his film and stage career.

== Production ==
Production for the album was handled by Mos Def, Kanye West, 88-Keys, Minnesota, Warryn Campbell, and Psycho Les. It also features contributions from Mos Def's rock musical project Black Jack Johnson, which was named after boxing champion Jack Johnson and consists of guitarist Dr. Know, keyboardist Bernie Worrell, bassist Doug Wimbish, and drummer Will Calhoun.

== Critical reception ==
Professional ratings
Aggregate scores
Source	Rating
Metacritic	59/100
Review scores
Source	Rating
AllMusic	2.5/5 stars
Blender	3/5 stars
Entertainment Weekly	C+
The Independent	5/5 stars
NME	7/10
Pitchfork	5.4/10
Q	2/5 stars
Rolling Stone	4/5 stars
Spin	B
The Village Voice	A−

The New Danger received generally mixed reviews from critics; it holds an aggregate score of 59 out of 100 at Metacritic. Blender called it "mushily sentimental, self-righteously indignant and constantly in your face", while AllMusic's Andy Kellman said it was "a sprawling, overambitious mess". New York magazine panned the album as "an unsatisfying muddle of protest music, black rock, and rap". In The New York Times, Kelefa Sanneh wrote that the record suffered from extended soul songs that meandered, dull rock songs, and some raps such as "The Rape Over" that were devoid of Mos Def's usual "warmth and wit". NME deemed some of the songs failed experiments but also highlighted "Boogie Man Song", "Modern Marvel", and "Champion Requiem" as more timeless material. Rolling Stone critic Tom Moon was more enthusiastic, hailing the album as an "earthy, impressively diverse" work that showcased Mos Def's abilities to "create deeply nuanced characterizations" and "broaden the hip-hop palette without sacrificing, or selling out, its core ideals". Writing for The Village Voice, Robert Christgau said while Mos Def's previous records were driven by his "verbal flow", The New Danger was more interesting musically and defined by its sonic flow, which the critic described as "a shadowy, guitar-drenched tone poem of the streets". In his ballot for the annual Pazz & Jop critics poll, he named it the 19th best album of 2004. LA Weekly included the track "Zimzallabim" in their list of "Ten Rap-Rock Songs That Are Actually Awesome".

== Commercial performance ==
The New Danger was released by Geffen Records on October 12, 2004, in the United States and October 18 in the United Kingdom. It debuted at number five on the Billboard 200 in its first week, and by March 2014, it had sold 513,000 copies in the US. In August 2017, the album was certified gold by the RIAA, indicating sales and their equivalents—streams and track downloads—of 500,000 units in the U.S.

== Track listing ==
No.	Title	Producer(s)	Length
1.	"The Boogie Man Song"	Mos Def; Raphael Saadiq	2:22
2.	"Freaky Black Greetings"	Mos Def	2:20
3.	"Ghetto Rock"	Minnesota	3:53
4.	"Zimzallabim"	Easy Mo Bee; Mos Def	3:41
5.	"The Rape Over"	Kanye West	1:34
6.	"Blue Black Jack" (featuring Shuggie Otis)	Minnesota	5:47
7.	"Bedstuy Parade & Funeral March" (featuring Paul Oscher)	Mos Def	4:32
8.	"Sex, Love & Money"	Warryn Campbell	4:09
9.	"Sunshine"	Kanye West	4:25
10.	"Close Edge"	Minnesota	3:10
11.	"The Panties"	Minnesota	4:11
12.	"War"	Mos Def; Psycho Les	3:07
13.	"Grown Man Business (Fresh Vintage Bottles)" (featuring Minnesota)	Minnesota	3:24
14.	"Modern Marvel"	Minnesota	9:19
15.	"Life Is Real"	Molecules	3:11
16.	"The Easy Spell"	Mos Def	5:32
17.	"The Beggar" (featuring Paul Oscher)	Mos Def	5:19
18.	"Champion Requiem"	88-Keys	4:52

UK Edition bonus track
No.	Title	Producer(s)	Length
19.	"The Jump Off" (featuring Ludacris)	Minnesota	4:21

Japanese Edition bonus track
No.	Title	Producer(s)	Length
19.	"That Dude" (featuring Foxy Brown)	88-Keys	4:14

== Charts ==
Chart (2004)	Peak position
Canadian Albums	12
Canadian R&B Albums	20
French Albums Chart	103
Swiss Albums Chart	50
UK Albums Chart	56
US Billboard 200	5
US Billboard Top R&B/Hip-Hop Albums	2
US Billboard Top Rap Albums	1

Singles

Year	Title
2004	"Sex, Love & Money"
2004	"Close Edge"

== Certifications ==
Region	Certification	Certified units/sales
United States (RIAA)	Gold	500,000^{^}
^{^} Shipments figures based on certification alone.

== Personnel ==
- Mos Def - vocals, piano (track 1), drums (tracks 1 and 16), guitar, bass and percussion (track 16)
- Black Jack Johnson - House Band (feat. Will Calhoun - drums, Doug Wimbish - bass, Dr. Know - guitar and Bernie Worrell - keyboard)
- Raphael Saadiq - guitar and bass (track 1)
- Minnesota - producer
- Easy Mo Bee - producer
- Kanye West - producer
- Shuggie Otis - guitar
- L Mitchellon (?) - piano, organ
- Warryn Campbell - producer
- Psycho Les - producer
- 88-Keys - producer
