= Black on Both Sides =

Studio album by Mos Def
- Released: October 12, 1999
- Genre: East Coast hip-hop
- Length: 71:21
- Labels: Rawkus; Priority
- Producers: Mos Def (also exec.); Diamond D; Ge-ology; 88-Keys; DJ Premier; Ayatollah; D Prosper; Ali Shaheed Muhammad; Psycho Les; DJ Etch-A-Sketch; David Kennedy

Mos Def chronology
Mos Def & Talib Kweli Are Black Star (1998)	Black on Both Sides (1999)	The New Danger (2004)

Singles from Black on Both Sides
- 1. "Ms. Fat Booty" / "Mathematics" Released: August 2, 1999; 2. "Umi Says" Released: 2000

Black on Both Sides is the debut solo studio album by American rapper Mos Def, released on October 12, 1999, by Rawkus and Priority Records. Released after his successful collaboration Mos Def & Talib Kweli Are Black Star, Black on Both Sides emphasizes live instrumentation and socially conscious lyrics. On February 2, 2000, the album was certified Gold in sales by the Recording Industry Association of America (RIAA), following sales in excess of 500,000 copies.

== Music ==
=== Production ===
The album features a mix between established and rising producers. DJ Premier provides the instrumental track for "Mathematics". Diamond D is credited for "Hip Hop". Ali Shaheed Muhammad, known mostly as a member of A Tribe Called Quest, produced the seventh song "Got". Psycho Les of The Beatnuts produced "New World Water" and "Rock N Roll". Jazz legend Weldon Irvine provided additional production to "Climb".

Ayatollah produced "Ms. Fat Booty" and "Know That". 88-Keys produced "Love" and "Speed Law" and co-produced the instrumental outro "May–December" with Bey himself. David Kennedy (the second swing of "Brooklyn" and "Umi Says" produced with Bey), Mr. Khaliyl ("Do It Now"), DJ Etch-A-Sketch ("Climb" and "Habitat"), Ge-ology (The first swing of "Brooklyn") and D. Prosper ("Mr. Nigga") round out the other contributors.

Bey received production assistance on most of the album's tracks. His sole production credit comes at "Fear Not of Man", but he provided additional production to four tracks ("Hip Hop", "Rock N Roll", "Climb" and "Mr. Nigga") and co-produced three ("Umi Says", "Brooklyn" and "May–December").

=== Early versions ===
On the song "Brooklyn", a three-movement piece dedicated to Mos's neighborhood in Bedford-Stuyvesant, New York, Bey rhymes three verses over three different beats. The first beat is an original composition produced by Ge-ology, while the second verse is a re-creation Smif-N-Wessun's "Home Sweet Home" and the last verse is set to the instrumental track of The Notorious B.I.G.'s 1995 single "Who Shot Ya?". Originally, Bey rhymed three complete verses over Ge-ology's musical composition, now referred to as the first movement of the song. On a later version, the first and third verses are set to the instrumentals of two other 1995 New York rap hits, "Incarcerated Scarfaces" by Raekwon as well as "Give Up the Goods (Just Step)" by Mobb Deep, respectively. The "Who Shot Ya?" verse, with the same vocal take on the released version, is placed in the middle. Bey sings his own interpretation of the Red Hot Chili Peppers song "Under the Bridge".

=== Video ===
Bey was involved with two videos for Umi Says. One was more traditional, while the second one came when Nike and Jordan Brand chose "Umi Says" as its theme song for its Much Respect series of commercials for the Air Jordan XVI. As a result, the second video features appearances from Michael Finley, Eddie Jones, Derek Jeter, Roy Jones Jr., Ray Allen and even Michael Jordan himself.

== Reception ==
Professional ratings
Review scores
Source	Rating
AllMusic	5/5 stars
Christgau's Consumer Guide	A−
Entertainment Weekly	A−
Muzik	4/5 stars
NME	8/10
Pitchfork	8.7/10
Rolling Stone	3.5/5 stars
The Rolling Stone Album Guide	4/5 stars
The Source	4/5 stars
Spin	10/10
Q	3/5 stars

Black on Both Sides received universal acclaim from critics. Matt Diehl of Entertainment Weekly praised the album's diversity and noted, "Merging old-school bravado with new-school poetics, the Brooklyn legend spouts incisive Afrocentric reality that takes all sides into account." Dan Leroy of Yahoo! Music opined that "Not since Rakim's heyday has a mic-rocker so clearly articulated such complex and entertaining thoughts, with the ability to wax eloquently on matters metaphysical ('Love') and just plain physical ('Ms. Fat Booty')" and hailed the album as "a sure pick as one of the year's best."

The Independent lauded the record's "sharp reflections on a range of subjects from parochialism to pollution, fear to fat booties, rap to rock 'n' roll" and wrote that Black on Both Sides "stands as a proud example of the heights hip-hop can achieve when its exponents put their minds to it." The Village Voice's Robert Christgau wrote that while he felt the album ran too long, "the wealth of good-hearted reflection and well-calibrated production overwhelms one's petty objections". In a retrospective review, Charles Aaron of Spin described Bey as a "restless B-Boy citizen of the world" and called the album "playful, witty, and heart-pounding."

== Track listing ==
No.	Title	Writer(s)	Producer(s)	Length
1.	"Fear Not of Man"	Dante Smith	Mos Def	4:28
2.	"Hip Hop"	D. Smith; Joseph Kirkland; David Axelrod; Michael Axelrod; Gabriel Jackson	Diamond D; Mos Def^{[a]}	3:16
3.	"Love"	D. Smith; Charles Njapa	88-Keys	4:23
4.	"Ms. Fat Booty"	D. Smith; Lamont Dorrell; Eddie Snyder; Charles Singleton	Ayatollah	3:43
5.	"Speed Law"	D. Smith; Njapa	88-Keys	4:16
6.	"Do It Now" (featuring Busta Rhymes)	D. Smith; Trevor Smith; Acklins Dillon	Mr. Khaliyl	3:49
7.	"Got"	D. Smith; Ali Shaheed Muhammad	Ali Shaheed Muhammad	3:27
8.	"Umi Says"	D. Smith	Mos Def; David Kennedy^{[a]}	5:10
9.	"New World Water"	D. Smith; Lester Fernandez	Psycho Les	3:11
10.	"Rock N Roll"	D. Smith; Fernandez	Psycho Les; Mos Def^{[a]}	5:02
11.	"Know That" (featuring Talib Kweli)	D. Smith; Talib Kweli Greene; Dorrell; Burt Bacharach; Hal David	Ayatollah	4:03
12.	"Climb" (featuring Vinia Mojica)	D. Smith; Weldon Irvine; Thomas Dunn	DJ Etch-A-Sketch; Weldon Irvine^{[a]}; Mos Def^{[a]}	4:02
13.	"Brooklyn"	D. Smith; Gerard Young; David Kennedy; Harry Whitaker III	Ge-ology; Mos Def; David Kennedy^{[b]}	5:09
14.	"Habitat"	D. Smith; Irvine	DJ Etch-A-Sketch	4:39
15.	"Mr. Nigga" (featuring Q-Tip)	D. Smith; Derick Prosper	D Prosper; Mos Def^{[a]}	5:12
16.	"Mathematics"	D. Smith; Christopher Martin; David Gates	DJ Premier	4:06
17.	"May–December"	D. Smith; Njapa; Irvine	88-Keys; Mos Def	3:29
Total length:				71:21

Notes

- ^{^[a]} signifies a co-producer.
- ^{^[b]} The song consists of three distinct movements. The first one was produced by Ge-ology, the second by David Kennedy and Yasiin Bey, and the third one by Bey

Sample credits

- "Fear Not of Man" contains samples of "Fear Not for Man", written and performed by Fela Kuti; and "Morgenspaziergang", written by Ralf Hütter and Florian Schneider, and performed by Kraftwerk.
- "Hip Hop" contains samples of "The Warnings (Part II)", written by David Axelrod and Michael Thomas Axelrod, and performed by David Axelrod; and "Slow Dance", written and performed by Stanley Clarke; and an interpolation of "Spoonin Rap", written and performed by Spoonie Gee.
- "Love" contains a sample of "Porgy (I Loves You, Porgy)", written by Ira Gershwin, George Gershwin, DuBose Heyward and Dorothy Heyward, and performed by Bill Evans Trio.
- "Ms. Fat Booty" contains a sample of "One Step Ahead", written by Eddie Snyder and Charles Singleton, and performed by Aretha Franklin.
- "Speed Law" contains samples of "And That's Saying a Lot", written by Chuck Jackson and Walter Godfrey, and performed by Christine McVie; and "Promise Her Anything but Give Her Arpeggio", written by David Schallock, and performed by Big Brother & the Holding Company.
- "Do It Now" contains a sample of "Marcus Garvey", written by Winston Rodney, and performed by Burning Spear.
- "Rock N Roll" contains a sample of "Memphis at Sunrise", written by Allen Jones and Jerome McLaughlin, and performed by Bar-Kays.
- "Know That" contains samples of "Anyone Who Had a Heart", written by Burt Bacharach and Hal David, and performed by Dionne Warwick; and "The Sweetest Thing", written by Lauryn Hill and Wyclef Jean, and performed by Refugee Camp All-Stars featuring Lauryn Hill.
- "Brooklyn" contains samples of "What Are You Doing the Rest of Your Life?", written by Alan Bergman, Marilyn Bergman and Michel Legrand, and performed by Milt Jackson; "We Live in Brooklyn, Baby", written by Harry Whitaker, and performed by Roy Ayers, and "Who Shot Ya?", written by Christopher Wallace, Sean Combs, Nashiem Myrick, Allie Wrubel and Herbert Magidson, and performed by The Notorious B.I.G.
- "Habitat" contains a sample of "The Symphony", written by Marlon Williams, Duval Clear, Craig Curry, Nathaniel Wilson, Antonio Hardy, Otis Redding, Allen Jones and Al Bell, and performed by Marley Marl featuring Masta Ace, Craig G, Kool G Rap and Big Daddy Kane.
- "Mr. Nigga" contains a sample of "A Legend in His Own Mind", written and performed by Gil-Scott Heron.
- "Mathematics" contains samples of "Baby I'm-a Want You", written by David Gates, and performed by The Fatback Band, "On & On", written by Erykah Badu and JaBorn Jamal, and performed by Badu, "Funky Drummer", written and performed by James Brown, and a clip of Art Seigner interviewing Angela Davis.
- "May–December" contains a sample of "Jungle Jazz", written and performed by Kool & the Gang; and a sample of "Rock Your Baby", written by Harry Wayne Casey and Richard Finch, and performed by KC & the Sunshine Band.

== Personnel ==
- Yasiin Bey – executive producer, bass (1–2, 10, 17), congas (1, 15), percussion (1, 15), keyboards (2), drums (10), strings arrangement (12), vibraphone (17)
- Weldon Irvine – keyboards (1), Hammond organ (8), strings arrangement (12), piano (17)
- David Kennedy – recording engineer (2–5, 14), mixing engineer (2–6, 14)
- Etch-A-Sketch – scratches (2)
- Johnny Why – recording engineer (6), guitar (10)
- Will I Am – Fender Rhodes piano (8)
- Shaka – executive producer

== Charts ==
Chart (1999)	Peak position
UK Albums Chart	56
US Billboard 200	25
US Billboard Top R&B/Hip-Hop Albums	3
US Billboard Top Rap Albums	1

Singles

Year	Title	US R&B	US Rap	UK
1999	"Ms. Fat Booty"	54	3	—
2000	"Umi Says"	—	—	8

== Certifications ==
Region	Certification	Certified units/sales
United States (RIAA)	Gold	500,000^{^}
^{^} Shipments figures based on certification alone.
