= Charles Aaron =

American music journalist and editor

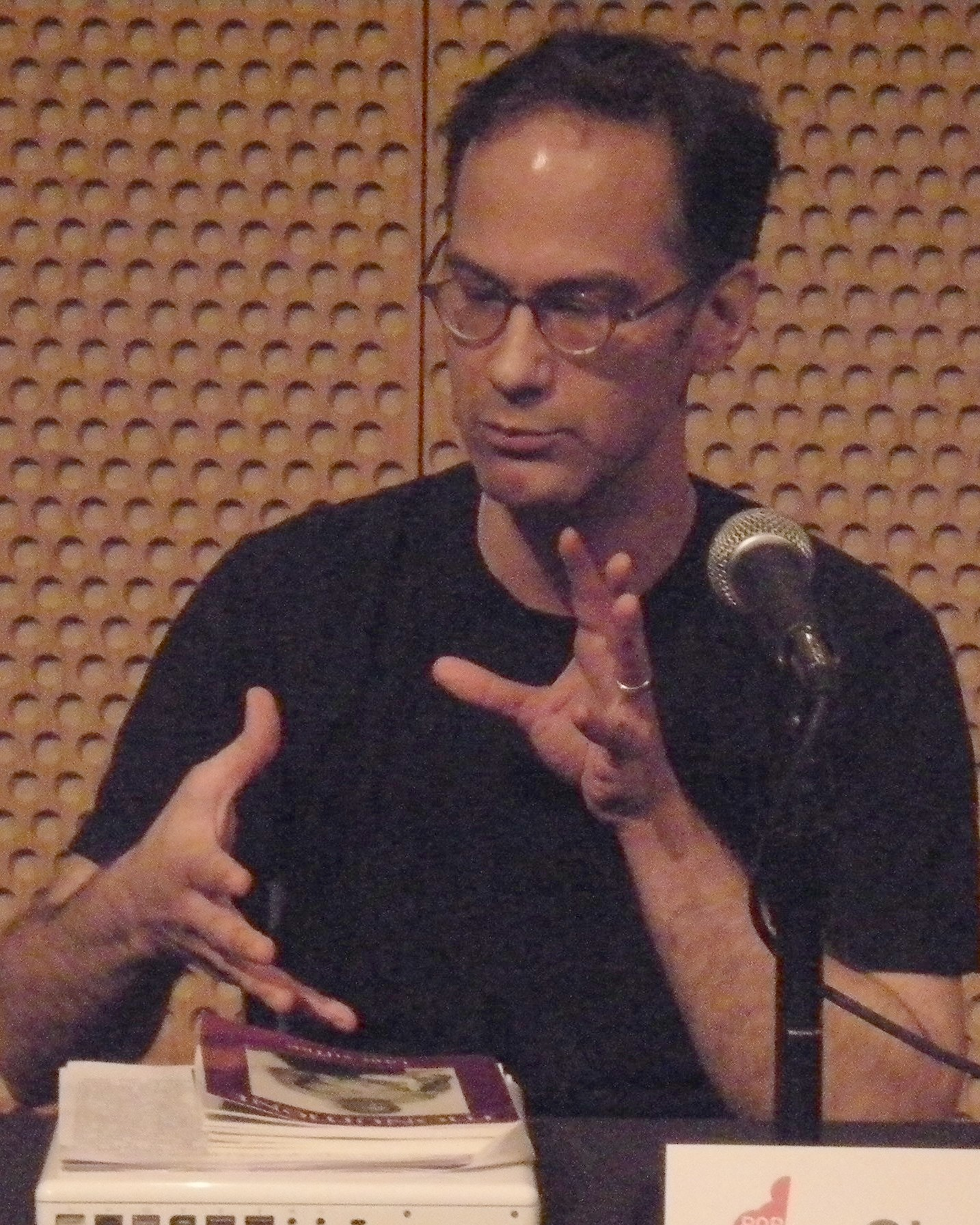
- Aaron on the panel "He Pop/She Pop", 2008 Pop Conference, Experience Music Project, Seattle, Washington
- Born: Rockingham, North Carolina, U.S.
- Education: University of Georgia
- Occupations: Music journalist and editor
- Employer: Spin magazine
- Known for: Music journalism about rappers

Charles Aaron is an American music journalist and editor, formerly for Spin magazine, where he worked for 23 years.

== Personal life ==
Charles Aaron was born in Rockingham, North Carolina, and raised in Asheboro, North Carolina and Rome, Georgia. He attended the University of Georgia in Athens, Georgia, and graduated in 1985. Aaron lived in Brooklyn, New York City, New York, with his wife Tristin and son but moved to Durham, North Carolina, after leaving Spin magazine.

== Career ==
After graduation in 1985, Charles Aaron began his journalism career at AdWeek and Sassy magazines. Before working full-time for Spin magazine, he freelanced as a music journalist at the magazine and for other publications like Rolling Stone, Village Voice, and Vibe.

Spin, an alternative music magazine, was launched in 1985. Charles Aaron began as a contributor to Spin magazine around 1991 while the hip hop music genre was becoming popular with white audiences. In one article, he refers to himself as a "white hip hopper" and says over time he wrote many articles for the magazine in appreciation of the genre. He wrote his first feature about Snoop Dogg's father for the magazine in 1993. He joined the staff of Spin magazine in 1996. He moved into his music editor roles with the magazine in 1998 and 2002. In 2011, Aaron was promoted to editorial director. BuzzMedia (now SpinMedia) took over the magazine 2011 making staff cuts and changes. That same year Spin transformed itself from 11 printed issues per year to a greater digital presence but with almost half the printed issues. In 2013, he became editor at large. Charles Aaron's last issue with Spin magazine was February 2014.

After leaving Spin, Aaron wrote for other magazines, such as Rolling Stone and Wondering Sound.

== Notable works of journalism ==
The article "Remembering Notorious B.I.G." was reprinted in the March 2010 issue of Spin, for which Aaron received an award.

On the occasion of Aaron's last issue (February 2014), Spin reprinted what was considered some of his best music journalism, including "'Sir Real'" from 1993 about Snoop Doggy Dogg.

As editorial director, Aaron also oversaw the use of apps that would allow audience to listen to artists while reading about them or to remix dance songs using app tools.

=== Awards ===
In 2000, Charles Aaron and Sia Michel, both of Spin, were presented with the ASCAP-Deems Taylor Award for their coverage of The Notorious B.I.G.'s career, which appeared in the magazine's January 1998 issue.

Also in 2000, Aaron won a National Arts Journalism Fellowship from Columbia University's Graduate School of Journalism.

The American Society of Magazine Editors named Spin's tablet version a finalist or its Ellie Awards in 2012.

=== Influence ===
Amanda Petrusich, a music critic, says she was influenced by Aaron's music journalism for Spin magazine.

== In popular culture ==
Charles Aaron was widely speculated to be the alleged author behind "The Rock Critical List", which appeared online in February 1999. While Aaron denied authorship and there was no credible evidence linking him to authorship, the list was believed to have been written by an insider.

== See also ==
- Hip hop music
