= List of songs recorded by Talib Kweli =

The following is a list of songs by Talib Kweli organized by alphabetical order. The songs on the list are all included in official label-released albums, soundtracks and singles, but not white label or other non-label releases. Next to the song titles is the album, soundtrack, or single on which it appears. Remixes and live versions of songs are listed as bullet points below the original song, but clean, explicit, a cappella and instrumental tracks are not included.

Contents:	Top - 0-9 A B C D E F G H I J K L M N O P R S T W Y External links

== 0-9 ==
1. "2000 Seasons" by Reflection Eternal (Soundbombing, 1997)

== A ==
1. "A Game" (The Beautiful Struggle, 2004)
2. "Africa Dream" by Reflection Eternal (Train of Thought, 2000)
3. "Alright" by Stat Quo (Statlanta, 2010)
4. "Amongst Gods" by Self Scientific (Nature Sounds' Hurricane Relief Benefit Megamix, 2005)
5. "(Another) Another World" by The Creators; featuring Mos Def (The Weight, 2000)
  - "Another World (Remix)" featuring Mos Def ("Another World (Remix)"/"Rise & Shine," 1999)
6. "Around My Way" featuring John Legend (The Beautiful Struggle, 2004)
7. "Astronomy (8th Light)" by Black Star; featuring Weldon Irvine (Black Star, 1998)

== B ==
1. "B Boys Will B Boys" by Black Star (Black Star, 1998)
2. "Back Up Offa Me" (The Beautiful Struggle, 2004)
3. "Beautiful Struggle" (The Beautiful Struggle, 2004)
  - "Beautiful (Blackstar Remix)" by Mary J. Blige; featuring Black Star ("All That I Can Say," 1999)
4. "Big Del from Da Natti" by Reflection Eternal; featuring Big Del (Train of Thought, 2000)
5. "Black Girl Pain" featuring Jean Grae (The Beautiful Struggle, 2004)
6. "Born & Raised" by Black Star (Dave Chappelle's Block Party Soundtrack, 2006)
7. "Bridge To 'Bama (Hi Tek Remix)" by Soulive (Next, 2002)
8. "Bright as the Stars" by Black Star ("Ah Ha"/"Bright as the Stars," 2005)
9. "Broken Glass" (The Beautiful Struggle, 2004)
10. "Brown Skin Lady" by Black Star (Black Star, 1998)
  - "Bullshit (Paul Nice Remix)" featuring Black Thought and Jane Doe (Journey to the Centre of the Beats, 2004)

== C ==
1. "Can We Go Back" by Hi-Tek; featuring Ayak (Hi-Teknology 2: The Chip, 2006)
2. "Certified Samurai" featuring Free Murda, Suga Bang Bang and Terry Tory (The RZA Presents: Afro Samurai OST, 2007)
3. "Chaos" by Reflection Eternal (Soundbombing 2, 1999)
4. "Children's Story" by Black Star (Black Star, 1998)
5. "Chillin'" by Erick Sermon; featuring Whip Montez (Chilltown, New York, 2004)
6. "Comin' from the Lower Level" by CHOPS; featuring Phil da Agony and Ras Kass (Virtuosity, 2003)
7. "Communicate" by GE-OLOGY; featuring Sadat X ("Communicate," 2001)
  - "Communicate (Remix)" by GE-OLOGY; featuring Sadat X ("Communicate," 2001)
8. "Country Cousins" featuring Raheem Devaughn and UGK (Eardrum, 2007)
9. "Cypher Outside the Lounge" by Brooklyn Academy; featuring Lil Sci, Sean Mitchell and Shabbam Sadeeq (The Academy Awards - A Greatest Hits Collection - Vol. 1: The Classics, 2003)

City playgrounds from revolutions per minute

== D ==
1. "Day by Day" by Tommy Tee; featuring A.L., Punchline and Wordsworth (Bonds, Beats & Beliefs, 1998)
2. "Definition" by Black Star (Black Star, 1998)
3. "Down for the Count" by Reflection Eternal; featuring Rah Digga and Xzibit (Train of Thought, 2000)
4. "Don't Let Up" by Planet Asia ("Don't Let Up," 2000)
5. "Drugs, Basketball & Rap" featuring Phil da Agony and Planet Asia (Right About Now: The Official Sucka Free Mix CD, 2005)
6. "Due Process" by Lone Catalysts; featuring Rubix (Hip Hop, 2001)
7. "Doc Shebeleza (Remix)" by Cassper Nyovest (Hip Hop, 2014)

== E ==
1. "Eat to Live" (Eardrum, 2007)
2. "Engine Runnin" with Madlib; featuring Consequence (Liberation, 2007)
3. "Eternalists" by Reflection Eternal (Train of Thought, 2000)
4. "Everything Man" (Eardrum, 2007)
5. "Expansion Outro" by Reflection Eternal (Train of Thought, 2000)
6. "Experience Dedication" by Reflection Eternal; featuring Dave Chappelle (Train of Thought, 2000)

== F ==
1. "Fallen Star" (The Rose, Vol. 2, 2005)
2. "Flash Gordon" (Right About Now: The Official Sucka Free Mix CD, 2005)
3. "Feel the Bass" by Sa-Ra (The Hollywood Recordings, 2007)
4. "Finally Free' by DeStorm (Be Careful, 2012)
5. "Fly That Knot" featuring MF Doom (Right About Now: The Official Sucka Free Mix CD, 2005)
6. "Fly Till I Die" by Pete Rock; featuring CL Smooth (Soul Survivor II, 2004)
7. "Foolin' Yourself" by Clinton Sparks ("Foolin' Yourself," 2004)
8. "For the City" by Phil da Agony (The Aromatic Album, 2004)
9. "For Women" by Reflection Eternal (Train of Thought, 2000)
10. "Fortified Live" by Reflection Eternal; featuring Mos Def and Mr. Man (Soundbombing, 1997)
  - "Fortified Live Remix" by Reflection Eternal; remixed by Pish Posh; featuring Mos Def and Mr. Man (Up Jumps the Boogie, 1998)
11. "Freedom" by Estelle; featuring John Legend (The 18th Day, 2004)
12. "Freestyle" featuring Mos Def (Soundbombing, 1997)
13. "Freestyle" by King Medallions; featuring J Hood (Jewelry Box Sessions Part One, 2005)
14. "Fruits of Labor in the Sunshine" by Wizdom Life & Matt Fingaz (NYC Indie Hip Hop: The Nervous 90's, 2007)
15. "Funny Money" with Madlib (Liberation, 2007)

== G ==
1. "Get Em High" by Kanye West; featuring Common (The College Dropout, 2004)
  - "Get 'Em High (Remix)" by Kanye West; featuring Common ("Get 'Em High (Remix)," 2004)
  - "Get Back (Remix)" by Reflection Eternal (Hip Hop Classics Vol. 1, 2001)
  - "Get Back Pt. II" by Hi-Tek; featuring DCQ (Hi-Teknology, 2001)
2. "Get By" (Quality, 2002)
  - "Get By (Extended Remix)" by Talib Kweli featuring Mos Def, Jay-Z, Kanye West & Busta Rhymes (Quality, 2002)
3. "Getting Up Anthem, Pt. 1" featuring Rakim (Getting Up (Soundtrack), 2006)
  - "Getting Up Anthem (Remix)" featuring Rakim (The Foundation, 2006)
4. "Ghetto Afterlife" by Reflection Eternal; featuring Kool G Rap (Train of Thought, 2000)
5. "Ghetto Show" featuring Anthony Hamilton and Common (The Beautiful Struggle, 2004)
6. "Give 'Em Hell" featuring Coi Mattison and Lyfe Jennings
7. "Go" featuring Ras Kass and Phil da Agony ("Steady Aromatic 2... The Purple Pack", 2003)
8. "Go Crazy" featuring Ras Kass ("Revenge of the Spit", 2006)
9. "Go With Us" featuring Strong Arm Steady (Eardrum, 2007)
10. "Going Hard" (The Beautiful Struggle, 2004)
11. "Good Mourning" by Reflection Eternal (Train of Thought, 2000)
12. "Good to You" (Quality, 2002)
13. "Guerrilla Monsoon Rap" featuring Black Thought, Kanye West and Pharoahe Monch (Quality, 2002)
14. "Gun Music" featuring Cocoa Brovaz (Quality, 2002)
15. "Greatness" by Karma Fields

== H ==
1. "Hard Margin" by The Creators; featuring Mos Def (The Weight, 2000)
2. "Happy Home" with Madlib; featuring Candice Anderson (Liberation, 2007)
3. "Hater Players" by Black Star; featuring Apani (Black Star, 1998)
4. "Here We Go" ("Here We Go"/"Nothin' but a Party," 2000)
5. "High Drama" by Mike Zoot; featuring Mos Def (Guesswhyld Presents Past, Present And Future, 2001)
  - "High Drama, Pt. 3: The Search for 2" by Mike Zoot; featuring Consequence and Mos Def ("High Drama, Pt. 3: The Search for 2," 2003)
6. "Hip Hop Worth Dying For" by Main Flow (Hip Hopulation, 2004)
7. "Holy Moly" (Eardrum, 2007)
8. "Hope" by Pete Philly and Perquisite (Mindstate, 2005)
9. "Hostile Gospel Pt. 1 (Deliver Us)" (Eardrum, 2007)
  - "Hostile Gospel Pt. 2 (Deliver Me)" featuring Sizzla (Eardrum, 2007)
10. "Hot Night" by Me'Shell NdegéOcello (Cookie: The Anthropological Mixtape, 2002)
11. "Hot Thing" featuring will.i.am (Eardrum, 2007)
12. "How We Do It" by Hi-Tek; featuring Slim Thug and Snoop Dogg (Hi-Teknology 2: The Chip (Limited Edition), 2006)

== I ==
1. "I Am" by Novel (Autobiography,)
2. "I Get Lonely" by Capital J (V.I.P. Dubz, 2004)
3. "I Try" featuring Mary J. Blige (The Beautiful Struggle, 2004)
4. "If" by Kenn Starr; featuring Asheru (Starr Status, 2006)
5. "Industry Lies" by Mood (Doom, 1997)
6. "In the Mood" featuring Kanye West and Roy Ayers (Eardrum, 2007)
7. "Intro" by Black Star (Black Star, 1998)
  - "It's Going Down Pt. 2 (Bink! Remix)" by Blackalicious; featuring Jonell and Lateef ("It's Going Down (Sit Back)," 2002)
  - "It's Going Gown (Lava Rocks) Pt. 3 (Chief Xcel Remix)" by Blackalicious; featuring Lateef ("It's Going Down (Sit Back)," 2002)

== J ==
1. "Joy" featuring Mos Def (Quality, 2002)
2. "Just Be Yourself" by Son Of Light (War Of The Words, 2011)

== K ==
1. "K.O.S. (Determination)" by Black Star; featuring Vinia Mojica (Black Star, 1998)
2. "Keynote Speaker" featuring Dave Chappelle (Quality, 2002)
3. "Kindness for Weakness" by Dilated Peoples (20/20, 2006)
4. "Know That" by Mos Def (Black on Both Sides, 1999)

== L ==
1. "Learn Truth" by R.A. the Rugged Man (Legends Never Die, 2013)
2. "Let It Breathe" by Hush (Bulletproof, 2005)
3. "Let It Go" by Hi-Tek; featuring Dion (Hi-Teknology 2: The Chip, 2006)
  - "Let Me See (Reflection Eternal Hip Hop Mix)" by Morcheeba ("Let Me See," 1998)
4. "Like That" by The Black Eyed Peas; featuring Cee-Lo, John Legend and Q-Tip (Monkey Business, 2005)
5. "Listen!!!" (Eardrum, 2007)
  - "Live on Stage (Remix)" by Dilated Peoples ("Live on Stage"/"Clockwork," 2001)
6. "Long Life" by Dela; (Changes of Atmosphere, 2008)
7. "Love Language" by Reflection Eternal; featuring Les Nubians (Train of Thought, 2000)
8. "Love Speakeasy" by Reflection Eternal (Train of Thought, 2000)
9. "Lunchroom Classics" featuring Makeba Mooncycle (Tags of the Times Version 2.0, 1999)
10. "Lyrical Fluctuation (Original Mix)" by Jigmastas; featuring Mos Def, Mr. Complex, Pharoahe Monch and Shabaam Sahdeeq (Grass Roots "Lyrical Fluctuation", 2000)
  - "Lyrical Fluctuation (Spinna Mix)" by Jigmastas; featuring Mos Def, Mr. Complex, Pharoahe Monch and Shabaam Sahdeeq (Grass Roots "Lyrical Fluctuation", 2000)
11. "Los elegidos" by Nach; featuring Akhenaton (rapper)

== M ==
1. "Make Things Better" by DJ Hurricane; featuring N'Dea Davenport (Don't Sleep, 2000)
2. "Manifesto" (Lyricist Lounge, Volume One, 1998)
3. "Memories Live" by Reflection Eternal (Train of Thought, 2000)
4. "Millionaires" featuring Rubix (Mission Control Presents: Prehistoric Sounds Featuring Mood, 2000)
5. "Miss January" by The Procussions (5 Sparrows for 2 Cents, 2006)
6. "Mood Swing" by Asheru (7 Heads R Better Than 1 Vol. 1: No Edge Ups in South Africa, 2003)
7. "More or Less" featuring Dion (Eardrum, 2007)
8. "Move Somethin'" by Reflection Eternal (Train of Thought, 2000)
  - "Move Somethin' (JL Mix)" by Reflection Eternal ("Move Somethin' (Remixes)," 2001)
9. "Ms. Hill" (Right About Now: The Official Sucka Free Mix CD, 2005)
10. "Music" by MyG; featuring Zelly Rock (Sidewalk Symphony, 2004)
11. "My Favorite Mutiny" by The Coup; featuring Black Thought (Pick a Bigger Weapon, 2006)

== N ==
1. "Name of the Game" by Reflection Eternal (Train of Thought, 2000)
2. "Never Been in Love" (The Beautiful Struggle, 2004)
3. "Nuclear Hip Hop" by Mood (Doom, 1997)
4. "NY Weather Report" (Eardrum, 2007)

== O ==
  - "Officially Missing You (MIDI Mafia Remix)" by Tamia ("Officially Missing You (The Remixes)," 2003)
1. "Oh My Stars" featuring Musiq Soulchild (Eardrum, 2007)
2. "Old School" by Danger Doom (The Mouse and the Mask, 2005)
3. "On Mission" by Reflection Eternal (Soundbombing 2, 1999)
4. "On My Way" by Reflection Eternal (Train of Thought, 2000)
5. "One-Nine-Nine-Nine" by Common; featuring Sadat X (Soundbombing II, 1999)
6. "One Four Love (Part 1)" featuring Common, Doug E. Fresh, Kool G Rap, Mos Def, Pharoahe Monch, Posdnuos, Rah Digga, Shabaam Sahdeeq and Sporty Thievz (Hip Hop for Respect EP, 2000)
7. "Outside the Lounge" featuring Building Block, Lil' Sci, Mr. Metaphor, Shabaam Sahdeeq and Wiseguy (Lyricist Lounge, Volume One, 1998)
8. "Over the Counter" with Madlib (Liberation, 2007)
9. "Oz Theme 2000" featuring Kool G Rap and Lord Jamar (Oz Original Soundtrack, 2001)

== P ==
1. "Peace of Mind" ("Peace of Mind," 2004)
2. "Peddlers of Doom" by Mood (Doom, 1997)
3. "Power, Money and Influence" by Guru; featuring Jean Grae (Version 7.0: The Street Scriptures, 2005)
4. "Prime Example" by Akhenaton (IAM) & Bruno Coulais ("Comme un Aimant soundtrack"/"S," 2000)
5. "Project Jazz" by Hell Razah; featuring Vik Vaughn (Renaissance Child, 2007)
6. "Protective Custody" featuring Breezly Brewin, Dante, EL-P, Imani Uzuri, Jah-Born, John Forte, Main Flow, Mr. Khaliyl, Mr. Len, Nine, Punchline, Tiye Phoenix and What? What? (Hip Hop for Respect EP, 2000)
7. "Push Thru" featuring Kendrick Lamar and Currensy (Prisoner of Conscious, 2013)
8. "Put It in the Air" featuring DJ Quik (Quality, 2002)

== R ==
1. "Raise the Bar" by DJ Babu (Duck Season Vol. 2, 2003)
2. "Raw Shit" by Jaylib (Champion Sound, 2003)
3. "Real Women" by UGK; featuring Raheem DeVaughn (UGK (Underground Kingz), 2007)
4. "RE:DEFinition" by Black Star (Black Star, 1998)
5. "Respiration" by Black Star; featuring Common (Black Star, 1998)
  - "Respiration (Flying High Mix)" by Black Star; featuring Black Thought ("Respiration," 1999)
  - "Respiration (Remix)" by Black Star; featuring Common (Hip Hop Classics Vol. 1, 2001)
6. "Rhymes & Ammo" by The Roots; featuring Dice Raw (Phrenology, 2002)
7. "Ridin'" by David Banner; featuring dead prez (Certified, 2005)
8. "Right About Now" (Right About Now: The Official Sucka Free Mix CD, 2005)
9. "Rock On" (Right About Now: The Official Sucka Free Mix CD, 2005)
10. "Roll Off Me" (Right About Now: The Official Sucka Free Mix CD, 2005)
11. "Rolling With Heat" by The Roots; featuring Dice Raw (Phrenology, 2002)
12. "Rush" featuring Xzibit (Quality, 2002)

== S ==
1. "Sacred - Pt. 1" by Mood (Doom, 1997)
2. "Say Something" featuring Jean Grae (Eardrum, 2007)
3. "Shame" by Strong Arm Steady; featuring Planet Asia (Strong Arm Steady Presents The Collectors Edition Vol. 1, 2005)
4. "Sharp Shooters" featuring dead prez (Lyricist Lounge 2, 2000)
5. "Shock Body" (Quality, 2002)
6. "Shuffering + Shmiling" featuring Bilal, dead prez, Jorge Ben Jor and Positive Force (Red Hot + Riot: The Music and Spirit of Fela Kuti, 2002)
7. "Some Kind of Wonderful" by Reflection Eternal (Train of Thought, 2000)
8. "Soul Music" with Madlib (Liberation, 2007)
9. "Soul Rebels" by Reflection Eternal; featuring De La Soul (Train of Thought, 2000)
10. "Soon the New Day" featuring Norah Jones (Eardrum, 2007)
11. "Space Fruit (Interlude)" featuring Sa-Ra (Eardrum, 2007)
12. "Stand to the Side" featuring Novel and Vinia Mojica (Quality, 2002)
13. "Stay Around" (Eardrum, 2007)
14. "Stay High Freestyle" (featuring Ras Kass, 2006)
15. "Supreme Supreme" featuring Mos Def (Right About Now: The Official Sucka Free Mix CD, 2005)

== T ==
1. "Talk to You (Lil' Darlin')" featuring Bilal (Quality, 2002)
2. "Talking to You" featuring A-Butta, Mos Def, Pharoahe Monch and Rah Digga ("C.I.A."/"Talking to You," 1997)
3. "Temperature" by Zion I (True & Livin', 2005)
  - "Temperature (Bedrock Remix)" by Zion I ("Temperature"/"The Bay," 2005)
4. "Terra Firma/Love Connection" by Rubix ("(No) Thinking Aloud," 2000)
5. "Testify" by Styles P (Time Is Money, 2006)
6. "The Anti-Love Movement" by Da Beatminerz; featuring Total (Brace 4 Impak, 2001)
7. "The Beast" featuring Papoose (Right About Now: The Official Sucka Free Mix CD, 2005)
8. "The Blast" by Reflection Eternal; featuring Vinia Mojica (Train of Thought, 2000)
  - "The Blast (Remix)" by Reflection Eternal; featuring Erykah Badu ("The Blast (Remix)," 2001)
9. "The Express" by Reflection Eternal ("The Express"/"Some Kind of Wonderful," 2000)
10. "The Function" with Madlib; featuring Strong Arm Steady (Liberation, 2007)
11. "The Human Element" by Reflection Eternal; featuring Te' (The Unbound Project, Vol. 1, 2000)
  - "The Life (Remix)" by Mystic; featuring Kam ("The Life (Remix)," 2002)
12. "The Nature" featuring Justin Timberlake (Eardrum, 2007)
13. "The Perfect Beat" featuring KRS-One (Eardrum, 2007)
14. "The Proem" by DJ Quik; featuring Hi-C and Shyheim (Under tha Influence, 2002)
15. "The Proud" (Quality, 2002)
16. "The Show" with Madlib (Liberation, 2007)
17. "The Truth" by Pharaohe Monch; featuring Common (Internal Affairs, 1999)
18. "Theme from Hi-Tek" by Hi-Tek (Hi-Teknology, 2001)
19. "Thieves in the Night" by Black Star (Black Star, 1998)
20. "This Means You" by Reflection Eternal; featuring Mos Def (Train of Thought, 2000)
21. "Time Is Money" with Madlib (Liberation, 2007)
22. "Time Is Now" by Hi-Tek (Hi-Teknology 2: The Chip (Limited Edition), 2006)
23. "Time Zone" by DJ Spinna; featuring Apani B. Fly (Heavy Beats Volume 1, 1999)
24. "Too Late" by Reflection Eternal; featuring Res (Train of Thought, 2000)
25. "Touch You" by Reflection Eternal; featuring Piakhan and Supa Dave West (Train of Thought, 2000)
26. "Tunnel Bound" by Mood (Doom, 1997)
27. "Twice Inna Lifetime" by Black Star; featuring Jane Doe, Punchline and Wordsworth (Black Star, 1998)
28. "Two & Two" (Right About Now: The Official Sucka Free Mix CD, 2005)

== W ==
1. "Wack Niggas" by Consequence; featuring Common and Kanye West (Take 'Em to the Cleaners, 2004)
2. "Wages of Sin" by Mr. Khaliyl ("Wages of Sin"/"Street Team," 2001)
3. "Waitin' for the DJ" featuring Bilal (Quality, 2002)
4. "We Came Up (Crystal Stair)" by Smif-N-Wessun (Smif 'N' Wessun: Reloaded, 2005)
5. "We Can Make It Better" by Kanye West; featuring Common, Q-Tip and Rhymefest (Hurricane Relief: Come Together Now, 2005)
6. "We Got the Beat" featuring Res (The Beautiful Struggle, 2004)
7. "We Know" featuring Faith Evans (The Beautiful Struggle, 2004)
8. "What Can I Do" with Madlib (Liberation, 2007)
9. "What They May Seem" featuring Tony Touch (Black Label: Hip Hop 101, 2000)
10. "What If?" by L-Fudge; featuring Mike Zoot, Shabaam Sahdeeq and Skam (Soundbombing, 1997)
11. "Where Do We Go" featuring Res (Quality, 2002)
12. "Where It Started At (NY)" by Hi-Tek; featuring Dion, Jadakiss, Papoose and Raekwon (Hi-Teknology 2: The Chip, 2006)
13. "Where Ya Gonna Run" featuring Jean Grae (Right About Now: The Official Sucka Free Mix CD, 2005)
14. "Who Got It" (Right About Now: The Official Sucka Free Mix CD, 2005)
15. "Won't You Stay" featuring Kendra Ross (Quality, 2002)
16. "Work It Out" (The Beautiful Struggle, 2004)

== Y ==
1. "Y'all Stay Up" by Youngblood Brass Band (Unlearn, 2000)
  - "Y'all Stay Up (Fred Ones Remix)" by Youngblood Brass Band ("Y'all Stay Up," 2002)
2. "Yelling Away" by Zap Mama; featuring Ahmir 'Questlove' Thompson and Common (Ancestry in Progress, 2004)
  - "Yelling Away (Hezekiah Remix)" by Zap Mama; featuring Ahmir 'Questlove' Thompson and Common ("Yelling Away," 2005)
  - "Yelling Away (Z Productions Remix)" by Zap Mama; featuring Ahmir 'Questlove' Thompson and Common ("Yelling Away," 2005)
  - "Yelling Away (Oddisee Remix)" by Zap Mama; featuring Oddisee and Common (Halftooth Records Presents: You Think You Know Volume II, 2005)
3. "Yo Yeah" by Black Star (Black Star, 1998)
4. "Your Move" by Black Star unreleased track, 1999)
