= Hi-Teknology 3 =

Hi-Teknology³

Studio album by Hi-Tek
- Released: December 11, 2007
- Studios: Tek Lab Studios (Cincinnati, OH); SMT Studios (New York, NY)
- Genre: Hip-hop
- Length: 51:58
- Label: Babygrande
- Producers: Hi-Tek; Fitz "The Art Teacher" Reid; Howard White

Hi-Tek chronology
Hi-Teknology²: The Chip (2006)	Hi-Teknology³ (2007)	Revolutions Per Minute (2010)

Professional ratings
Review scores
Source	Rating
AllHipHop	7.5/10 stars
AllMusic	3/5 stars
HipHopDX	3/5
laut.de	3/5 stars
Pitchfork	6.7/10
PopMatters	4/10
RapReviews	6.5/10

Hi-Teknology³ is the third solo studio album by American DJ and record producer Hi-Tek. It was released on December 11, 2007 via Babygrande Records, marking his second album for the label and the third installment in his Hi-Teknology series. Recording sessions took place at Tek Lab Studios in Cincinnati and at SMT Studios in New York City. Produced by Hi-Tek himself together with Fitz "The Art Teacher" Reid and Howard White, it featues guest appearances from Dion Jenkins, Big D, Chip tha Ripper, Count, Cross, Estelle, Ghostface Killah, Jonell, Kurupt, Lep, Lil' Tone, Little Brother, M-1, Mann, Outlawz, Push Montana, Raekwon, Rem Dog, Riz, Showtime and Young Buck, as well as his Reflection Eternal cohort Talib Kweli.

In the United States, the album peaked at number 60 on the Top R&B/Hip-Hop Albums and number 49 on the Independent Albums charts.

At the end of 2012, DJ Hi-Tek announced the release of the fourth Hi-Teknology album, subtitled Ohio Player, which was scheduled for 2013. However, the project never saw the light of day.

== Track listing ==
No.	Title	Writer(s)	Length
1.	"Tek Intro"	Tony Cottrell; C. Isaacs	1:12
2.	"Life to Me" (featuring Estelle)	Cottrell; Estelle Swaray	4:36
3.	"Interlude" (featuring Lil' Tone)	Cottrell	0:43
4.	"My Piano" (featuring Ghostface Killah, Raekwon and Dion)	Cottrell; Dennis Coles; Corey Woods; Dion Jenkins; M. Jones	4:07
5.	"God's Plan" (featuring Young Buck and Outlawz)	Cottrell; David Brown; Rufus Cooper; Malcolm Greenidge	2:33
6.	"Ohio All Stars" (featuring Cross, Showtime, Mann and Chip tha Ripper)	Cottrell; Cross; A. Vasser; Dijon Thames; Charles Worth	4:33
7.	"Back on the Grind" (featuring Riz, Kurupt and Dion)	Cottrell; R. Joyner; Ricardo Brown; Jenkins	4:28
8.	"I'm Back" (featuring Rem Dog)	Cottrell; C. Pullin; Howard White	3:54
9.	"Kill You" (featuring Push Montana)	Cottrell; Robert White; Fitz Reid	3:21
10.	"Handling My Bizness" (featuring Lep, Count, Big D' and M-1)	Cottrell; R. Wilburn; E. Jones; Delvin Geralds; Lavonne Alford	3:57
11.	"Come Get It" (Tekrumentals)	Cottrell; Daniel Jones	3:39
12.	"Step Ya Game Up Remix" (featuring Dion and Little Brother)	Cottrell; Jenkins; Phonte Coleman; Thomas Jones	3:48
13.	"Know Me" (featuring Jonell)	Cottrell; Shanonn Showes; M. Ambrosius	5:19
14.	"Time" (featuring Talib Kweli and Dion)	Cottrell; Talib Kweli Greene; Jenkins	4:39
15.	"Outtro"	Cottrell; Martin McKinney	1:09
Total length:			51:58

== Personnel ==
- Tony "Hi-Tek" Cottrell – producer, recording, mixing, executive producer
- LJ – live keyboards (track 2)
- Daniel Jones – additional keyboards (tracks: 4, 11)
- Jeff Bhasker – additional keyboards (tracks: 5, 7)
- Eric Coomes – live bass (track 12)
- Kelvin Wooten – additional keyboards (track 13)
- Eric Krasno – live bass (track 14)
- Martin "Doc" McKinney – guitars (track 15)
- Howard White – producer (track 8)
- Fitz "The Art Teacher" Reid – producer (track 9)
- Steve Baughman – mixing (track 4)
- Dragan Čačinović – mixing (track 9)
- Serban Ghenea – mixing (track 13)
- Mark B. Christensen – mastering
- Charles "Chuck" Wilson, Jr. – executive producer
- Seth Kushner – photography
- Derick Prosper – A&R
- Rodney "Boney Bones" Newman – A&R
