= Snoop Dogg Presents: Dubb Union =

Studio album by Dubb Union
- Released: August 19, 2008
- Recorded: 2008
- Genre: West Coast hip hop; gangsta rap
- Length: 1:13:07
- Label: Koch Records
- Producer: Snoop Dogg (exec.); Chris "THX" Goodman; Hi-Tek; J-Doe; Jukebox; Nominz; Soopafly; Teddy Riley; Warryn "Baby Dubb" Campbell

Professional ratings
Review scores
Source	Rating
RapReviews	7.5/10

Snoop Dogg Presents: Dubb Union is the debut album by American hip hop group Dubb Union. It was released on August 19, 2008, via Koch Records. Production was handled by member Soopafly, Hi-Tek, Nominz, Chris "THX" Goodman, J-Doe, Ronald "Jukebox" Jackson, Teddy Riley and Warryn "Baby Dubb" Campbell, with Snoop Dogg serving as executive producer. It features guest appearances from BJ the Chicago Kid, Dion Jenkins, Daz Dillinger, Kurupt, Minister Tony Muhammad, Snoop Dogg, Traci Nelson and Uncle Chucc. The album peaked at number 85 on the Top R&B/Hip-Hop Albums chart in the United States.

== Track listing ==
No.	Title	Writer(s)	Producer(s)	Length
1.	"Hata Talk"	Priest Brooks; Damani Washington; Terence Harden	Soopafly	2:48
2.	"Welcome to the Majors!!" (featuring BJ the Chicago Kid)	Brooks; Washington; Harden; Bryan Sledge; James Smith	J-Doe	3:39
3.	"Sign Language"	Brooks; Washington; Harden; Warryn Campbell	Baby Dubb	4:17
4.	"Westurn Union!!" (featuring BJ the Chicago Kid and Daz Dillinger)	Brooks; Washington; Harden; Sledge; Delmar Arnaud	Soopafly	4:02
5.	"Dont Like You Girl" (featuring Snoop Dogg)	Brooks; Washington; Harden	Soopafly	4:16
6.	"We Both Know" (featuring Dion)	Brooks; Washington; Harden; Dion Jenkins; Tony Cottrell	Hi-Tek; Soopafly (co.)	4:28
7.	"Dippin Thru!!"	Brooks; Washington; Harden	Soopafly	4:28
8.	"Turn It Up"	Brooks; Washington; Harden; Ronald Jackson; Theodore Riley	Jukebox; Teddy Riley	4:12
9.	"Eusi Umoja (Interlude)" (featuring Minister Tony Muhammad)			1:18
10.	"Struggle" (featuring BJ the Chicago Kid)	Brooks; Washington; Harden; James Amankwa; R. Thomas	Nominz	4:25
11.	"Tear It Off"	Brooks; Washington; Harden	Soopafly	4:20
12.	"Bacc Talk" (featuring Dion)	Brooks; Washington; Harden; Jenkins; Cottrell	Hi-Tek	4:06
13.	"Dub You!!" (featuring Kurupt and Traci Nelson)	Brooks; Washington; Harden; Ricardo Brown; Christopher Goodman	Chris "THX" Goodman	5:41
14.	"Miles Away!!" (featuring BJ the Chicago Kid)	Brooks; Washington; Harden; Sledge; Amankwa	Nominz	3:49
15.	"Getting Mines" (featuring Uncle Chucc)	Brooks; Washington; Harden; Charles Hamilton	Soopafly	5:45
16.	"Doggystyle West Fest Mix"	Brooks; Washington; Harden		11:33
Total length:				1:13:07

Sample credits

- Track 13 contains a sample of the recording "Good Old Funky Music" by The Meters

== Personnel ==
- Priest "Soopafly" Brooks – main artist, keyboards (tracks: 1, 4–7, 11, 15), strings (track 10), producer (tracks: 1, 4, 5, 7, 11, 15), co-producer (track 6), recording (tracks: 4, 7, 8, 10, 11, 14, 15), mixing (tracks: 1, 2, 4–7, 10–15)
- Damani Nkosi Washington – main artist
- Terence "Bad Lucc" Harden – main artist
- Bryan "BJ the Chicago Kid" Sledge – featured artist (tracks: 2, 4, 10, 14)
- Delmar "Daz Dillinger" Arnaud – featured artist (track 4)
- Calvin "Snoop Dogg" Broadus – featured artist (track 5), executive producer
- Dion Jenkins – featured artist (tracks: 6, 12)
- Minister Tony Muhammad – featured artist (track 9)
- Ricardo "Kurupt" Brown – featured artist (track 13)
- Traci Nelson – featured artist (track 13)
- Charles "Uncle Chucc" Hamilton – featured artist (track 15)
- Robert "Bubby" Smith – bass (track 10)
- James "J-Doe" Smith – producer (track 2)
- Warryn "Baby Dubb" Campbell – producer (track 3)
- Tony "Hi-Tek" Cottrell – producer (tracks: 6, 12)
- Ronald "Jukebox" Jackson – producer (track 8)
- Teddy Riley – producer & mixing (track 8)
- James "Nominz" Amankwa – producer (tracks: 10, 14)
- Chris "THX" Goodman – producer (track 13)
- "Shon Don" Dornae Brooks – recording (tracks: 1, 2, 5, 12, 13)
- Bruce Buechner – recording (tracks: 3, 7), mixing (track 3)
- Dave Aron – mixing (tracks: 1, 2, 5–7, 10–15)
- Lamar "DJ Crazy Toones" Calhoun – arranger
- Andrew Mezzi – mixing assistant (tracks: 1, 2, 5–7, 10–15)
- David "Dizmix" Lopez – mastering
- Andrew Kelley – art direction, design
- Nykauni "Nkki" Tademy – A&R

== Charts ==
Chart (2008)	Peak position
US Top R&B/Hip-Hop Albums (Billboard)	85
