= The Blast (song) =

Single by Reflection Eternal (Talib Kweli & Hi-Tek)

from the album Train of Thought
- Released: July 16, 2001
- Recorded: 1999
- Genre: Hip hop
- Length: 3:07
- Label: Priority/Rawkus
- Songwriters: Tony Cottrell; Talib Kweli Greene; Vinia Mojica
- Producer: Hi-Tek

Reflection Eternal (Talib Kweli & Hi-Tek) singles chronology
"Move Somethin'" (2000)	"The Blast" (2001)	"Just Begun" (2010)

"The Blast" is a hip hop single from Reflection Eternal's debut album, Train of Thought. It features rapping from the duo's emcee, Talib Kweli, as well as from its producer, DJ Hi-Tek. It is the only Reflection Eternal song that Hi-Tek raps on, and like all Reflection Eternal songs, he produces it. The song has a somber and jazzy beat backed by vocals from Vinia Mojica. It has a music video directed by Little X in which Kweli and Hi-Tek are rapping in a rainstorm. Yasiin Bey aka Mos Def, Pharaohe Monch and Kweli's grandmother, Javotti Greene make cameo appearances. The music video version is extended in length, and gives Talib Kweli an extra verse. The song peaked at #2 on the Billboard Hot Rap Tracks and #49 on the Hot R&B/Hip-Hop Songs and was engineered by Guy Snider. The official remix features new verses by Talib Kweli as well as neo-soul singer Erykah Badu.

== Single track list ==
=== 12-inch single ===
==== A-Side ====
1. The Blast (Clean)
2. The Blast (Dirty)
3. The Blast (Instrumental)

==== B-Side ====
1. Down for the Count (Solo Version / Dirty)
2. Down for the Count (Solo Version / Instrumental)
3. Train of Thought (Clean)
4. Train of Thought (Instrumental)

=== CD single ===
1. The Blast
2. Down for the Count
3. Train of Thought

== See also ==
- List of Talib Kweli songs
