= Definition (song) =

Single by Black Star

from the album Mos Def & Talib Kweli Are Black Star
- Released: August 26, 1998
- Recorded: 1997–1998; Funky Slice Studios by Kwame "Success" Harris; Brooklyn, NY
- Genre: Conscious hip hop
- Length: 3:26
- Label: Rawkus Records
- Songwriters: Dante Smith; Talib Kweli Greene; Tony Cottrell
- Producer: Hi-Tek

Black Star singles chronology
"Definition" (1998)	"Respiration" (1999)

"Definition" is the first single from Black Star's eponymously titled 1998 album (see 1998 in music). It is produced by Hi-Tek, who samples "The P Is Free" by Boogie Down Productions for the track's beat. In addition, the song's chorus interpolates "Stop the Violence" by Boogie Down Productions. The chorus and the song's lyrics in general deal with the necessity to stop violence in hip hop. An underground hit, the song still reached #60 on the Billboard Hot 100 chart. It is featured on multiples compilations such as Best of Decade I: 1995–2005, Rawkus Records' greatest hits album. AllMusic writer Jason Kaufman considers it to be a "flawless" track.

A reprise of "Definition" titled "RE: DEFinition" can be found on the Black Star album.

It also appears on MTV Classic's 90's Nation and Yo! Hip Hop Mix.

== Track list ==
=== A-side ===
1. "Definition" (Radio Version)
2. "Definition" (What We Really Said)
3. "Definition" (Instrumental to Your Development)

=== B-side ===
1. "Twice Inna Lifetime" (Radiohead Version)
2. "Twice Inna Lifetime" (Streethead Version)
3. "Twice Inna Lifetime" (Instrumentally Yours)

== Charts ==
Chart (1998)	Peak position
U.S. Billboard Hot 100	60
U.S. Billboard Hot R&B/Hip-Hop Singles & Tracks	31
U.S. Billboard Hot Rap Singles	3

== See also ==
- List of Talib Kweli songs
