= Respiration (song) =

Single by Black Star featuring Common

from the album Mos Def & Talib Kweli Are Black Star
- Released: February 23, 1999
- Genre: Conscious hip hop; underground hip hop
- Length: 6:05
- Label: Rawkus Records
- Songwriters: Original: Talib Kweli Greene; Dante Terell Smith; Lonnie Rashid Lynn; Tony Cottrell; Remix: Talib Kweli Greene; Peter O. Philips; Dante Terell Smith; Tariq Trotter
- Producers: Original: Hi-Tek; Remix: Pete Rock

Black Star singles chronology
"Definition" (1998)	"Respiration" (1999)

Common singles chronology
"All Night Long" (1998)	"Respiration" (1999)	"One-Nine-Nine-Nine" (1999)

"Respiration" is a song by American rappers Mos Def and Talib Kweli, collectively known as Black Star. It was released as the second single from the duo's eponymously titled 1998 album (see 1998 in music). It features a guest verse from fellow American rapper Common and guitar playing by DeChown Jenkins. The song's production was handled by Hi-Tek, who sampled "The Fox" as performed by Don Randi. In addition, the song's introduction samples a monologue from the hip hop documentary Style Wars. It is found on Best of Decade I: 1995-2005, a compilation of Rawkus Records' best songs. It can also be found on Howie B's compilation album Another Late Night: Howie B. The single reached #54 on the Billboard Hot R&B/Hip-Hop Songs chart.

Two remixes were made for "Respiration": 'Flying High Mix' contains production by Pete Rock and a verse by Black Thought of The Roots. Another remix found on the Hip Hop Classics Vol. 1 compilation album also features Pete Rock production, but has a guest verse by Common instead of Black Thought.

== Single track list ==
=== A-Side ===
1. "Respiration (Album Version Radio Edit)"
2. "Respiration (Album Version Instrumental)"

=== B-Side ===
1. "Respiration (Flying High Radio Mix)"
2. "Respiration (Flying High Main Mix)"
3. "Respiration (Flying High Instrumental)"

== See also ==
- List of Talib Kweli songs
- List of Mos Def songs
- List of Common songs
