= Hi-Teknology²: The Chip =

Studio album by Hi-Tek
- Released: October 17, 2006
- Genre: Hip hop, Progressive rap, Soul, East Coast hip hop, West Coast hip hop, Hardcore Hip hop, Pop Rap
- Label: Babygrande
- Producer: Hi-Tek

Hi-Tek chronology
Hi-Teknology (2001)	Hi-Teknology²: The Chip (2006)	Hi-Teknology 3: Underground (2007)

Hi-Teknology²: The Chip is a sequel album to Hip hop producer Hi-Tek's first album, Hi-Teknology. Born as Tony Cottrell, He had spent most of his time in the low key hip-hop scene of Cincinnati, Ohio who eventually ran into Mood in 1992. Working with them kickstarted his career and affiliated himself with many MCs. He is best known for his collaboration with Talib Kweli on the album Reflection Eternal. He rose in popularity with the underground hip-hop scene and has worked alongside many talented even Grammy-nominated artists such as 50 Cent and Busta Rhymes. Although working with many talented artists and having a huge impact working with Rawkus Records Collective, it was time for him to show off his own unique abilities which led to his three solo albums. The release of his sequel album Hi-Teknology gained quick recognition and was soon to be sought after by many up-and-coming artists to produce their own albums.

== Album History ==
There are two versions of the album; one was recorded during Tek's record deal with MCA but never saw a release, and the second version which was released by Babygrande Records on October 17, 2006. It is produced entirely by Hi-Tek and, unlike the first album, has Hi-Tek rapping on more of the tracks. A special edition version of the album was released at Best Buy, featuring the three omitted tracks and a bonus DVD, featuring the music video for "Where It Started At (NY)" and footage of Hi-Tek producing "The Chip" from scratch. It reached #38 on the Billboard 200 chart position and #12 on the R&B/Hip-Hop chart position where US sales reached 51,782.

== Album Appearances ==
Album guests include Pretty Ugly, Q-Tip, Kurupt, Talib Kweli, Ghostface Killah, Busta Rhymes, Jadakiss, Papoose, Raekwon, The Game, Strong Arm Steady, Bun B, Devin the Dude, Nas, Common and Marsha of Floetry .

== Track Information ==
The final track listing has been whittled down from 18 to 15 tracks, omitting the songs, "How We Do It", "Time Is Now", and "We Get Down". The late producer, J Dilla, makes a cameo appearance on the song "Music For Life". The album's lead single is "Where It Started At (NY)", which features MC's Jadakiss, Papoose, Talib Kweli and Raekwon, and utilizes a sample from the Andy Williams song "(Where Do I Begin?) Love Story". The three omitted tracks ("Time Is Now", "We Get Down" & "How We Do It") were leaked on the internet on October 23, 2006. Both "Time is Now" and "How We Do It" were previously available on The Beautiful Mixtape Vol. 2. "Time is Now" was a shorter version.

== Covers ==
The album track "Let It Go" was later covered by British singer Ama Lou under the title "We Tried, we tried." on her 2019 EP, Ama, who?.

== Reception ==
Professional ratings
Review scores
Source	Rating
AllHipHop.com	4/5 stars
Allmusic	3.5/5 stars
HipHopDX.com	4.5/5 stars
RapReviews.com	4/5 stars
XXL Magazine	4/5 stars

Later on, Hi-Tek blamed the label for the lack of success of the album: "Hi-Teknology 2 was a prime example of a classic album, which just went down the drain as no one heard it. That’s not my fault; that is the label’s job to make sure people heard it. I get out and do every interview and all the press, but it was more a case of when they recouped, they were cool with that and it went no further. I had nine Interscope artists on that album and the only reason I got that was because of my relationship with [Dr.] Dre and Interscope. A lot of people wouldn’t be able to get that, so why not capitalize off that relationship?"

== Track listing ==
#	Title	Producer(s)	Performer (s)
1	"The Oracle (Intro)"	Hi-Tek	*Interlude*
2	"The Chip"	Hi-Tek	Hi-Tek
3	"Keep It Moving"	Hi-Tek, Daniel Jones	1st verse: Q-Tip; intro/2nd verse/outro: Kurupt; Chorus: Dion
4	"I Think I Got a Beat"	Hi-Tek	Lil' Tone
5	"Can We Go Back"	Hi-Tek, Firstman Productions	Ayak Thiik: rapping(1st): Hi-Tek; rapping(last): Talib Kweli; Chorus, Singing, Co-writer Verse: Ayak Thiik
6	"Josephine"	Hi-Tek, The Willie Cottrell Band	Intro/1st verse: Ghostface Killah; Chorus/Bridge: Willie Cottrell (The Willie Cottrell Band); 2nd verse: Pretty Ugly
7	"March"	Hi-Tek	Busta Rhymes
8	"Where It Started At (NY)"	Hi-Tek	Chorus: Dion; 1st verse: Jadakiss; 2nd verse: Papoose; 3rd verse: Talib Kweli; 4th verse: Raekwon
9	"1-800-Homicide"	Hi-Tek, Eric "Lil' E" Coomes	Chorus: Dion; Verse: The Game
10	"Money Don't Make U Rich"	Hi-Tek	intro: Xzibit; First Verse: Phil da Agony; Second Verse: Mitchy Slick; Third Verse: Krondon; Chorus: Strong Arm Steady
11	"Baby We Can Do It"	Hi-Tek, Young & Rich	Czar-Nok
12	"Let It Go"	Hi-Tek	Singing & Chorus: Dion; Rapping: Talib Kweli
13	"People Going Down"	Hi-Tek, The Willie Cottrell Band	The Willie Cottrell Band
14	"So Tired"	Hi-Tek	Chorus: Dion; 1st verse: Bun B; 2nd verse: Devin The Dude; 3rd verse: Pretty Ugly
15	"Music for Life"	Hi-Tek	1st message/3rd message: Jay Dee; 1st verse: Nas; 2nd verse: Hi-Tek; 3rd verse: Common; Chorus: Marsha; 2nd message: Busta Rhymes
16	"How We Do It" (Best Buy bonus track)	Hi-Tek	1st verse/Chorus: Talib Kweli; 2nd verse: Hi-Tek; 3rd verse: Slim Thug; 4th verse/outro: Snoop Dogg
17	"Time is Now" (Best Buy Bonus Track)	Hi-Tek	Reflection Eternal (Talib Kweli+Hi-Tek)
18	"We Get Down" (Best Buy Bonus Track)	Hi-Tek	Rapping: Mos Def; Chorus/bridges: Raphael Saadiq; Final verse: Bootsy Collins

=== Additional credits ===
The Chip

- Guitar - Josh Edmondson

Josephine

- Drums - Big D
- Drums [Additional] - Eric "E Dub" Isaacs
- Guitar - Larry Cottrell
- Keyboards - Carolyn Isaacs

March

- Guitar - Glen Jeffreys
- Keyboards - Daniel Jones

Let It Go

- Guitar - Glen Jeffreys

People Going Down

- Bass - Carolyn Isaacs
- Guitar - Larry Cottrell
- Keyboards - Carolyn Isaacs

== Album singles ==
Single cover	Single information
	"Where It Started At (NY)": Released: October 27, 2006; B-side: "Can We Go Back"

== Album chart positions ==
Year	Album	Chart positions			
Year	Album	Billboard 200	Top R&B/Hip Hop Albums	Top Rap Albums	Top Independent Albums
2006	Hi-Teknology² : The Chip	#38	#8	#4	#2
