= Quality (Talib Kweli album) =

Studio album by Talib Kweli
- Released: November 19, 2002
- Recorded: 2001–2002
- Genre: Alternative hip-hop
- Length: 65:13
- Label: Rawkus
- Producers: Kanye West; Megahertz; DJ Quik; DJ Scratch; J Dilla; Soulquarians; Supa Dave West; Ayatollah; Eric Krasno; Dahoud Darien

Talib Kweli chronology
Train of Thought (2000)	Quality (2002)	The Beautiful Struggle (2004)

Singles from Quality
- 1. "Good to You" / "Put It in the Air" Released: July 2, 2002; 2. "Waitin' for the DJ" / "Guerilla Monsoon Rap" Released: September 17, 2002; 3. "Get By" Released: March 11, 2003

Quality is the debut studio album by American rapper Talib Kweli. The album was released on November 19, 2002, by Rawkus Records. It received wide critical acclaim and had some commercial appeal from the song "Get By", produced by Kanye West. Kludge magazine included it on their list of best albums of 2002.

== Background ==
In 1998 Black Star released critically acclaimed album Mos Def & Talib Kweli are Black Star. The duo planned to release their second album, but Mos Def was busy working on film The Italian Job. Meanwhile, Kweli decided to work on other projects. As part of Reflection Eternal duo with Hi-Tek he released Train of Thought in 2000. Then, following the success of his previous albums, Kweli decided to release his debut solo album.

The album was called Quality. In 2002 interview with Rolling Stone rapper explained the album's name:

It was just the best way of trying to describe what I wanted to do. The word just fit. I'm trying to focus on quality over quantity.

— Talib Kweli

According to Billboard, the album's title is also a pun on Kweli's similarly pronounced surname.

== Release and promotion ==
Professional ratings
Aggregate scores
Source	Rating
Metacritic	79/100
Review scores
Source	Rating
AllMusic	4.5/5 stars
Blender	4/5 stars
The Guardian	3/5 stars
Houston Chronicle	4/5
Los Angeles Times	3/4 stars
Pitchfork	9.1/10
Rolling Stone	4/5 stars
Spin	8/10
USA Today	4/4 stars
Vibe	4.5/5 stars

Quality was released on November 19, 2002 (November 25 in the UK), by Rawkus Records. Despite Kweli still being considered an underground artist, the album was commercially successful. It peaked at number 21 on the Billboard 200 and number 6 on the Top R&B/Hip-Hop Albums chart. Three singles were released from the album; "Good to You"/"Put It in the Air", "Waitin' For The DJ"/"Guerilla Monsoon Rap" and "Get By". Despite positive reception, the first two singles failed to make any impact on mainstream charts, so the label decided to not release the third single, considering the song and its content not commercially viable. In response to this, Kweli and his manager made several copies of the single and sent it to a number of popular radio DJs across New York. With help from DJ Enuff, the team at Power 106, and many other local DJs, the single gained popularity through local airplay, and was eventually released by Rawkus. "Get By" received radio airplay in early 2003 and charted on the Billboard Hot 100, where it peaked at number 77, becoming Kweli's biggest solo hit. A music video for the song was later released and an official remix was recorded. The remix, featuring Kanye West, Mos Def, Jay Z, and Busta Rhymes, was aired for a short time on New York hip-hop radio, but did not receive an official release.

After the release of Quality, Kweli embarked on a tour in support of the album, where he was accompanied by friend and producer Kanye West as an opening act. At the time, West was considered a talented producer, but executives at West's label, Roc-A-Fella, did not feel he had potential as a solo rapper. Kweli allowed West to perform on stage with him during his concerts, giving West his first stage exposure to large crowds. West later expressed his gratitude to Kweli, saying that he owed a part of his early success to these performances.

== Track listing ==
Credits adapted from the album's liner notes.

No.	Title	Writer(s)	Producer(s)	Length
1.	"Keynote Speaker" (featuring Dave Chappelle)	Talib Kweli Greene; Dave Chappelle; Eric Krasno	Eric Krasno	2:14
2.	"Rush"	Greene; Dorsey Wesley	Megahertz	3:42
3.	"Get By"	Greene; Kanye West; Nina Simone	Kanye West	3:47
4.	"Shock Body"	Greene; Stephanie McKay; George Spivey; Roger Karshner; Chuck Mangione; Tiffany Phinazee	DJ Scratch	3:49
5.	"Gun Music" (featuring Cocoa Brovaz)	Greene; Tekomin Williams; Darrell Yates; Wesley	Megahertz	3:45
6.	"Waitin' for the DJ" (featuring Bilal)	Greene; Bilal Oliver; Dahoud Darien	Dahoud Darien	4:03
7.	"Joy" (featuring Mos Def)	Greene; Dante Smith; Lamont Dorrell; Curtis Mayfield	Ayatollah	4:14
8.	"Talk to You (Lil' Darlin')" (featuring Bilal)	Greene; Oliver; Pino Palladino; James Poyser; Ahmir Thompson; Hal Davis; Herman Griffith; Eddie Kendricks	The Soulquarians; Talib Kweli^{[a]}	5:00
9.	"Guerrilla Monsoon Rap" (featuring Black Thought & Pharoahe Monch)	Greene; Tariq Trotter; Troy Jamerson; K. West; Eugene Record; Stan McKenny	Kanye West	4:13
10.	"Put It in the Air" (featuring DJ Quik)	Greene; David Blake	DJ Quik	4:56
11.	"The Proud"	Greene; Dorrell	Ayatollah	5:06
12.	"Where Do We Go" (featuring Res)	Greene; Shareese Ballard; James Yancey	J Dilla	3:58
13.	"Stand to the Side" (featuring Novel & Vinia Mojica)	Greene; Alonzo Stevenson; Vinia Mojica; Yancey	J Dilla	6:32
14.	"Good to You"	Greene; K. West; Al Green	Kanye West	4:21
15.	"Won't You Stay" (featuring Kendra Ross)	Greene; Kendra Ross; Dave West; Wilbur Bascomb; Max Romer; William McLean; Andres Titus; Harold Clayton; Sigidi Abdullah; Waung Hankerson; William Young; Michael Young; Teodross Avery	Supa Dave West	5:25

Notes

- ^{^[a]} signifies a co-producer

Sample credits

- "Get By" contains elements from "Sinnerman", written and performed by Nina Simone.
- "Shock Body" contains elements from "Diana in the Autumn Wind", written by Roger Karshner and Chuck Mangione, performed by Chuck Mangione.
- "Joy" contains elements from "I Get High", written by Curtis Mayfield, performed by Aretha Franklin.
- "Talk to You (Lil' Darlin')" contains replayed elements from "Can I", written by Hal Davis and Herman Griffith, performed by Eddie Kendricks.
- "Guerrilla Monsoon Rap" contains elements from "I Never Had It So Good", written by Eugene Record and Stan McKenny, performed by The Chi-Lites.
- "Good to You" contains elements from "Simply Beautiful", written and performed by Al Green.
- "Won't You Stay" contains replayed elements from "Devil's Triangle", written by Wilbur Bascomb and Max Romer, performed by Wilbur Bascomb. It also contains re-sung elements from "Strobelite Honey", written by William McLean, Andres Titus, Harold Clayton, Sigidi Abdullah, Waung Hankerson, William Young, Michael Young; performed by Black Sheep.

== Personnel ==
Credits adapted from the album's liner notes.

- Geoff Allen – engineer (track 3)
- Teodross Avery – saxophone (track 15)
- Ayatollah – producer (tracks 7, 11)
- Bilal – featured performer (tracks 6, 8)
- Black Thought – featured performer (track 9)
- Maryham Blacksher – viola (track 12)
- Vernetta Bobien – background vocals (track 3)
- Randy Bowland – guitar (track 8)
- Tom Brick – mastering
- Marco Bruno – assistant engineer (tracks 5, 11)
- Dave Chappelle – performer (track 1)
- James Clark – keyboards (track 12)
- Cocoa Brovaz – featured performers (track 5)
- Erick Coomes – bass (tracks 1, 10)
- Morgan Michael Craft – guitar (track 2)
- Dave Dar – engineer (tracks 1, 2, 4, 5, 7, 8, 10–15), mixing (track 1)
- Dahoud Darien – producer (track 6)
- Abby Dobson – background vocals (track 3)
- Duane Eubanks – trumpet (tracks 3, 8)
- G-Man – mixing assistant (tracks 2, 5, 6, 8, 9, 11–13, 15)
- Serban Ghenea – mixing (tracks 3, 4, 14)
- Savion Glover – tap dance (track 13)
- Chinua Hawk – background vocals (track 3)
- J Dilla – producer (track 13)
- Junior Cat – intro vocals (track 5)
- Eric Krasno – producer (track 1)
- Talib Kweli – main performer, co-producer (track 8), arranger (track 1), executive producer
- Stephanie McKay – chorus vocals (track 4)
- Megahertz – producer (tracks 2, 5)
- Aisha Mike – additional vocals (track 8)
- Vinia Mojica – featured performer (track 13)
- Mos Def – featured performer (track 7)
- Joe Nardone – engineer (tracks 1, 3, 5–9, 11–13, 15), assistant engineer (tracks 4, 8)
- Axel Niehaus – mixing (tracks 2, 5, 6, 8, 9, 11–13, 15)
- Novel – featured performer (track 13)
- Tiffany Phinazee – chorus vocals (track 4)
- Pino Palladino – bass (track 8)
- Pharoahe Monch – featured performer (track 9)
- Neil Pogue – engineer (track 13), mixing (track 7)
- James Poyser – keyboards (tracks 8, 13)
- Emmanuel Pratt – violin (track 8)
- DJ Quik – featured performer, producer, and mixing (track 10)
- Michael Rapaport – skit performer (tracks 5, 13)
- Res – featured performer (track 12)
- Kendra Ross – background vocals (track 3)
- Jeymes Samuel– background vocals (track 11)
- DJ Scratch – producer (track 4)
- Corey Smyth – executive producer
- The Soulquarians – producers (track 8)
- William Taylor – background vocals (track 3)
- Ahmir "?uestlove" Thompson – drums (track 8)
- Dave West – producer (track 15)
- Kanye West – producer (tracks 3, 9, 14), additional vocals (track 9)
- Doug Wimbish – bass (tracks 2, 5)
- Xzibit – additional vocals (track 2)

== Chart positions ==
=== Weekly charts ===
Chart (2002)	Peak position
Canadian R&B Albums (Nielsen SoundScan)	18
US Billboard 200	21
US Top R&B/Hip-Hop Albums (Billboard)	6

=== Year-end charts ===
Chart (2002)	Position
Canadian R&B Albums (Nielsen SoundScan)	199
Canadian Rap Albums (Nielsen SoundScan)	99

Chart (2003)	Position
US Top R&B/Hip-Hop Albums (Billboard)	54

=== Singles ===
Song	Chart (2002)	Peak position
"Good to You"	US Hot R&B/Hip-Hop Songs (Billboard)	95
"Waitin' For The DJ"	US Hot R&B/Hip-Hop Songs (Billboard)	77
Song	Chart (2003)	Peak position
"Get By"	US Billboard Hot 100	77
"Get By"	US Hot R&B/Hip-Hop Songs (Billboard)	29
"Get By"	US Hot Rap Songs (Billboard)	16

=== Certifications ===
Region	Certification	Certified units/sales
United States (RIAA)	Gold	500,000^{‡}
^{‡} Sales+streaming figures based on certification alone.
