= Reflection Eternal =

American hip hop duo

- Origin: Brooklyn, New York City, U.S. Cincinnati, Ohio, U.S.
- Genres: Hip hop
- Years active: 1997–present
- Labels: Rawkus; Blacksmith
- Members: Talib Kweli; Hi-Tek

Reflection Eternal is an American hip hop duo composed of emcee Talib Kweli and producer Hi-Tek. They released their first album, Train of Thought, in 2000. They have since released a mixtape, The RE: Union, in late December 2009, and their second album Revolutions Per Minute was released May 18, 2010.

== History ==
The duo of Talib Kweli and Hi-Tek met in Tek's native Cincinnati, following the release of the Hi-Tek/Mood collaboration "Hustle on the Side". Kweli and Hi-Tek made their first official collaboration in 1997 on Mood's debut album, Doom, on the track "Industry Lies". That same year, the two formed as Reflection Eternal, and signed to upstart underground hip hop label Rawkus Records. The tracks from their debut single, "Fortified Live" b/w "2000 Seasons", were included on the Rawkus Records compilation Soundbombing in October 1997. In 1998, Kweli and his high school friend, fellow Rawkus Records artist Mos Def, formed the duo Black Star, and released their first album, Black Star, to rave reviews. Hi-Tek provided production for a number of songs on the album, including the singles "Definition" and "Respiration". The album put the three at the forefront of an underground hip hop scene that appeared at the time to be flagging against the influence of the "Jiggy" era of hip-hop, and was followed by a number of acclaimed collaborations and albums. Kweli and Hi-Tek reconnected in 2000 for the release of their debut album, Train of Thought. Though highly acclaimed, the release did not receive a significant amount of commercial attention, despite the success of the rap hits "Move Somethin'" and "The Blast".

Following the Train of Thought album, the duo split for solo projects, beginning with Hi-Tek's Hi-Teknology, released in 2001, on which Kweli appeared. The album didn't receive as much attention or as many sales as Train of Thought, though the single "Round & Round" became a crossover hit in 2002. Kweli released his first solo album, Quality, in late 2002. In a 2002 interview he also stated that another Reflection Eternal and Black Star album would be released. Hi-Tek was not involved with the project's production, instead featuring beats from artists like Kanye West, DJ Scratch, DJ Quik, Ayatollah and J Dilla. The Kanye West-produced single "Get By" became Kweli's biggest success, charting on the Billboard Hot 100 in 2003. Kweli's second solo album, 2004's The Beautiful Struggle, saw the duo working together once again, with three tracks produced by Hi-Tek. Kweli released his next album, Ear Drum, in 2007, featuring production from Tek; Hi-Tek released the follow-up to his debut, Hi-Teknology 2: The Chip, in 2006 and his third album, Hi-Teknology 3: The Underground, in 2007, both on Babygrande Records and both featuring appearances by Kweli.

The duo announced that another Reflection Eternal album was in the works in 2008. They named their second album Revolutions Per Minute. They played a live reunion gig in Toronto, Ontario, Canada on September 20, 2009. In the same year Bootsy Collins collaborated with Talib Kweli and Hi-Tek on the track "Internet Connection". also a track "Back Again" has been released along with video. They also collaborated with J. Cole, Mos Def, and Jay Electronica on the track "Just Begun". These three songs were released in a mixtape on January 1, 2010, called The Re:Union which received positive fanbase feedback. Their second album, Revolutions Per Minute, was released on May 18, 2010, with similar praise as their debut album. It spawned 3 singles: "In This World", "Strangers (Paranoid)" featuring former UGK member Bun B, and Midnight Hour featuring Atlantic recording artist Estelle.

== Discography ==
=== Studio albums ===
Album information
Train of Thought
- Released: October 17, 2000
- Billboard 200 chart position: #17
- R&B/Hip-Hop chart position: #5
- Singles: "Some Kind of Wonderful", "Move Somethin'"/"Good Mourning", "The Blast"/"Down For The Count"
Revolutions per Minute
- Released: May 18, 2010
- Billboard 200 chart position: #18
- R&B/Hip-Hop chart position: #5
- Singles: "Back Again", "Just Begun", "In This World", "Strangers (Paranoid)", "Midnight Hour"

=== Singles ===
| Year | Song | Chart positions | | | Album |
| Year | Song | U.S. Hot 100 | U.S. R&B | U.S. Rap | Album |
|---|---|---|---|---|---|
| 2000 | "Move Somethin'" | — | 32 | 1 | Train of Thought |
| 2001 | "The Blast" (featuring Vinia Mojica) | — | 48 | 2 | Train of Thought |
| 2009 | "Back Again" (featuring Res) | — | — | — | Revolutions per Minute |
| 2010 | "Just Begun" (featuring Jay Electronica, J. Cole and Mos Def) | — | — | — | Revolutions per Minute |
| 2010 | "In This World" | — | — | — | Revolutions per Minute |
| 2010 | "Strangers (Paranoid)" (featuring Bun B) | — | — | — | Revolutions per Minute |
| 2010 | "Midnight Hour" (featuring Estelle) | — | — | — | Revolutions per Minute |

=== Appearances as Reflection Eternal ===
- "Fortified Live"; "2000 Seasons" (appear on the Soundbombing compilation, 1997)
- "Let Me See (Remix)" (from the Morcheeba "Let Me See" single, 1998)
- "The Manifesto" (appears on Lyricist Lounge, Volume One compilation, 1998)
- "Chaos"; "On Mission" (appear on the Soundbombing 2 compilation, 1999)
- "Sharp Shooters" (from the Lyricist Lounge 2 compilation, 2000)
- "The Express" (from "The Express" single, 2000)
- "Train of Thought" (from "The Blast" single, 2000)
- "The Human Element" (from the Unbound Project, Volume 1 compilation, 2000)
- "Bridge to 'Bama (Remix)" (from the Soulive album Next, 2001)

=== Other Collaborations ===
- "Industry Lies" (from the Mood album Doom, 1997)
- 6 Songs from the Mos Def & Talib Kweli Black Star album, 1998
- "Halfway" (from the Brixx album Everything Happens for a Reason, 1999
- "Transmorgify" & "Empty Pages" (from the compilation Mission Control Presents, 2000; both songs by Mood)
- "Get Back, Pt. 2"; "Theme from Hi-Tek" from the Hi-Tek album Hi-Teknology, 2001
- "Back Up Offa Me"; "Work It Out"; "Beautiful Struggle" from the Talib Kweli album The Beautiful Struggle, 2004
- "Testify" from the Styles P album Time Is Money, 2006
- "Can We Go Back"; "Let It Go"; "Time Is Now" from the Hi-Tek album Hi-Teknology 2: The Chip, 2006
- "More or Less"; "The Perfect Beat" from the Talib Kweli album Eardrum, 2007
- "Time" from the Hi-Tek album Hi-Teknology 3, 2007
- "Every Ghetto" from the Talib Kweli & 9th Wonder mixtape Indie 500, 2015
