= Get By =

Single by Talib Kweli

from the album Quality
- Released: March 11, 2003
- Recorded: 2002
- Genre: Hip hop
- Length: 3:47
- Label: Rawkus
- Songwriter(s): Talib Kweli, Kanye West, Nina Simone
- Producer(s): Kanye West

Talib Kweli singles chronology
"Get By" (2003)	"Hostile Gospel" (2007)

Music video
- "Get By" on YouTube

"Get By" is a song by American hip hop recording artist Talib Kweli. It was released on March 11, 2003, as the third single from his debut studio album Quality (2002). Produced by Kanye West, the hip hop track samples "Sinnerman" as performed by Nina Simone and features background vocals from Abby Dobson, Chinua Hawk, Kendra Ross, Vernetta Bobien, and William "Na2" Taylor. The song peaked at number 77 on the US Billboard Hot 100 and at number 29 on the US Billboard Hot R&B/Hip-Hop Songs, becoming Kweli's most successful solo hit.

== Remix ==
A remix of the song was later released, featuring verses from fellow American rappers Mos Def, Jay-Z, Busta Rhymes, Kanye West, and Snoop Dogg. This full-fledged posse cut includes the first three rappers, who, like Kweli, are also from Brooklyn, New York City. The radio version of the remix featured only Busta Rhymes and Jay-Z, with extended verses from them and Kweli.

== Music video ==
A music video was recorded and released in 2003, highlighting the lives and struggles of low-income individuals from diverse cultural and racial backgrounds living in and around New York City. Parts of the video were filmed in Chinatown and Times Square. The song's producer, Kanye West, also appears in the video alongside Kweli.

== In popular culture ==
In 2008, Atlanta-based rapper Rocko released a song titled "Dis Morning" from his debut album Self Made, which interpolates Kweli's "Get By." Also in 2008, "Get By" was featured in the comedy film First Sunday as well as on the film's soundtrack. In 2009, North Carolina-born rapper J. Cole freestyled over the song's production, which appeared on his 2009 mixtape The Warm Up.

On the December 12, 2016, episode of the American satirical show Full Frontal with Samantha Bee, Kweli and writer Ashley Nicole Black modified the lyrics of "Get By" to highlight the benefits of online encryption.

== Charts ==
Chart (2003)	Peak position
US Billboard Hot 100	77
US Hot R&B/Hip-Hop Songs (Billboard)	29
US Hot Rap Songs (Billboard)	16
US Rhythmic (Billboard)	28
