= Train of Thought (Reflection Eternal album) =

Studio album by Reflection Eternal
- Released: October 17, 2000
- Recorded: 1999–2000
- Studio: Electric Lady Studios (in New York City)
- Genres: Hip hop; neo soul
- Length: 65:53
- Label: Rawkus
- Producers: Hi-Tek; Weldon Irvine; Talib Kweli

Reflection Eternal chronology
Train of Thought (2000)	Revolutions per Minute (2010)

Talib Kweli chronology
Mos Def & Talib Kweli Are Black Star (1998)	Train of Thought (2000)	Quality (2002)

Hi-Tek chronology
Train of Thought (2000)	Hi-Teknology (2001)

Singles from Train of Thought
- 1. "Move Somethin'" Released: July 18, 2000; 2. "The Blast" Released: July 16, 2001; 3. "Down for the Count" Released: 2001 (UK only)

Train of Thought is the debut album of American hip hop duo Reflection Eternal, released October 17, 2000, on Rawkus Records. Collaborating as a duo, rapper Talib Kweli and DJ and hip hop producer Hi-Tek recorded the album during 1999 to 2000, following their individual musical work that gained notice in New York's underground scene during the late 1990s. Kweli had previously worked with rapper Mos Def as the duo Black Star, and Hi-Tek had served as producer on the duo's debut album.

== Critical reception ==
Professional ratings
Review scores
Source	Rating
AllMusic	4.5/5 stars
Chicago Sun-Times	3.5/4 stars
Entertainment Weekly	B−
The Guardian	4/5 stars
Los Angeles Times	3.5/4 stars
NME	8/10
Pitchfork	7.9/10
Rolling Stone	3.5/5 stars
The Source	4/5 stars
USA Today	3/4 stars

Train of Thought was well received by music critics. Chicago Sun-Times writer Kyla Kyles said, "With a flurry of metaphors and below-the-basement underground beats, this train is on the right track. This disc proves that Kweli is a deep-thinking, gifted MC, and Hi Tek is an emerging wax master." AllMusic's Matt Conaway compared Reflection Eternal's music to the work of the Native Tongues collective, while writing that the album "houses enough merit to establish Talib as one of this generation's most poetic MCs". PopMatters writer Dave Heaton described Talib Kweli as "a hyper-articulate MC with a revolutionary's mind and a sensitive poet's heart, but he's also a world-class battle MC, able to rip other MCs' rhymes apart in a quick second". Kathryn Farr of Rolling Stone called Train of Thought "the rare socially aware hip-hop record that can get fists pumping in a rowdy nightclub".

Pitchfork critic Sam Eccleston wrote of Kweli's boastful lyrics, "Kweli uses the rhythm as a foundation, building rambling, baroque rhyme structures on top of them, exhibiting his cock-eyed 'skills'. This kind of braggadocio doesn't weaken the effort in the same way his moralizing self-canonization does, if only because he can often back those claims up". Noah Callahan-Bever of Vibe shared a similar sentiment, writing "Reflection Eternal's great weakness is Kweli's excessive preaching about the state of hip hop, but at least he cares". In The New Rolling Stone Album Guide (2004), Jon Caramanica called it "thick with fierce street raps ('Down for the Count' and 'Ghetto Afterlife'), maudlin soul ('Love Language'), and the type of insightful versifying Kweli has made his stock-in-trade ('Memories Live' and 'This Means You')".

== Track listing ==
No.	Title	Songwriters	Producer(s)	Performer (s)
1	"Experience Dedication"	Tony Cottrell; Talib Kweli Greene	Hi-Tek	Dave Chappelle; Talib Kweli
2	"Move Somethin'"	Tony Cottrell; Talib Kweli Greene	Hi-Tek	Talib Kweli; Nonye (background)
3	"Some Kind of Wonderful"	Tony Cottrell; Talib Kweli Greene	Hi-Tek	Talib Kweli
4	"The Blast"	Tony Cottrell; Talib Kweli Greene	Hi-Tek	Hi-Tek; Talib Kweli; Vinia Mojica
5	"This Means You"	Tony Cottrell; Talib Kweli Greene; Dante Smith	Hi-Tek	Talib Kweli; Mos Def
6	"Too Late"	Tony Cottrell; Talib Kweli Greene	Hi-Tek	Idle Warship
7	"Memories Live"	Tony Cottrell; Talib Kweli Greene	Hi-Tek	Talib Kweli; Big Del (background); Donte (background)
8	"Africa Dream"	Tony Cottrell; Talib Kweli Greene; Weldon Irvine	Talib Kweli; Weldon Irvine; Hi-Tek (co-producer)	Talib Kweli
9	"Down for the Count"	Tony Cottrell; Talib Kweli Greene; Rashia Fisher; Alvin Joiner	Hi-Tek	Lennox Lewis; Rah Digga; Talib Kweli; Xzibit
10	"Name of the Game"	Tony Cottrell; Talib Kweli Greene	Hi-Tek	Talib Kweli
11	"Ghetto Afterlife"	Tony Cottrell; Talib Kweli Greene; Nathaniel Wilson	Hi-Tek	Kool G Rap; Talib Kweli
12	"On My Way"	Tony Cottrell; E. Isaacs; J. Thomas	Hi-Tek	Kendra Ross; Tiye Phoenix; Vinia Mojica
13	"Love Language"	Tony Cottrell; Talib Kweli Greene; Helene Faussart; Celia Faussart	Hi-Tek	Les Nubians; Talib Kweli
14	"Love Speakeasy"	Tony Cottrell; Talib Kweli Greene	Hi-Tek	
15	"Soul Rebels"	Tony Cottrell; Talib Kweli Greene; Kelvin Mercer; David Jude Jolicoeur; Vincent Mason	Hi-Tek	Talib Kweli; De La Soul
16	"Eternalists"	Tony Cottrell; Talib Kweli Greene	Hi-Tek	Talib Kweli
17	"Big Del From da Natti"	Tony Cottrell; D. Geralds	Hi-Tek	Big Del
18	"Touch You"	Tony Cottrell; Talib Kweli Greene; D. Stanford Jr.; Dave West	Hi-Tek	Dave Chappelle; Piakhan; Supa Dav West; Talib Kweli
19	"Good Mourning"	Tony Cottrell; Talib Kweli Greene	Hi-Tek	Talib Kweli
20a	"Expansion Outro"			
20b	"Four Women"	Nina Simone	Hi-Tek; Talib Kweli (co-producer)	Talib Kweli; Darcel (background); Imani Uzuri (background); Katushia (background); Neb Luv (background); Tiye Phoenix (background); Tiyi Willingham (background); Tracie (background)

== Sample credits ==
Sample information for Train of Thought.

Move Something

- "Shaft's Mama" by Charlie Whitehead

This Means You

- "Cloud in My Sunshine" by Redbone

Too Late

- "Reverie" by Tomita
- "Passepied" by Tomita

Memories Live

- "I Can't Stand the Rain" by Ann Peebles
- "Carol Ann" by Soft Machine

Ghetto Afterlife

- "Tomorrow I May Not Feel the Same" by Gene Chandler

Love Language

- "Welcome" by Norman Connors

Love Speakeasy

- "Welcome" by Norman Connors

Soul Rebels

- "Funky Music" by Patti LaBelle

Eternalists

- "Follow the Leader" by Eric B. & Rakim

Big Del from Da Natti

- "Divided Reality" by Bo Hansson

Good Mourning

- "Dizzy" by Hugo Montenegro
- "C.R.E.A.M." by Wu-Tang Clan

== Personnel ==
- Rick James - Producer
- Hi-Tek - Producer, Engineer, Executive Producer, Mixing
- Weldon Irvine - Keyboards, Producer
- Tracie - Background Vocals
- Owen Brown - Fiddle
- De La Soul - Performer
- Derrick Gardner - Trumpet
- Troy Hightower - Engineer, Mixing
- Kool G Rap - Performer
- Guy Snider - Engineer
- Teodross Avery - Saxophone
- Ken Ifill - Mixing
- Vinia Mojica - Vocals
- Les Nubians - Performer
- Xzibit - Performer
- Steve Souder - Mixing
- Chris Athens - Mastering
- Mos Def - Performer
- Talib Kweli - Vocals, Producer, Executive Producer
- Monique Walker - Background Vocals
- Carlisle Young - Mixing
- Rah Digga - Performer
- Asi - Design, Layout Design
- Rikki Stein - Liner Notes
- Bassi Kolo Percussion Group - Percussion
- Big Del - Background Vocals
- Crossfader Chris - Cutting Engineer
- Dave Dar - Engineer, Mixing
- Darcel - Background Vocals
- Donte - Background Vocals
- Katushia - Background Vocals
- Jerome Lagarrigue - Illustrations, Cover Illustration
- Little Tone - Background Vocals
- Neb Luv - Background Vocals
- Nonye - Vocals
- Tiye Phoenix - Vocals, Background Vocals
- Kendra Ross - Vocals, Background Vocals
- Imani Uzuri - Background Vocals, Vocal Arrangement
- Tiyi Willingham - Background Vocals
- Willo - Design, Layout Design

== Album singles ==
Single information
"The Express" (Non-album single)
- Released: 2000
- B-side: "Some Kind Of Wonderful"
"Move Somethin'"
- Released: July 18, 2000
- B-side: "Good Mourning"
"The Blast"
- Released: July 16, 2001
- B-side: "Down for the Count" & "Train of Thought"
"Down for the Count" (UK Only release)
- Released: 2001
- B-side: "Down for the Count (Solo Version)"

== Chart history ==
Album

Chart (2000)	Peak position
US Billboard 200	17
US Top R&B/Hip Hop Albums	5

Singles

Year	Song	Charrt positions	
Year	Song	US R&B/Hip-Hop	US Rap
2000	"Move Somethin'"	32	1
2001	"The Blast"	48	2
