= Time Is Money (Styles P album) =

Studio album by Styles P
- Released: December 19, 2006
- Genre: Hip hop
- Length: 44:42
- Label: Ruff Ryders; Asti; Interscope
- Producer: The Alchemist; Lil Jon; Scott Storch; Neo Da Matrix; Hi-Tek; Havoc; Vinny Idol; Rashad; Dame Grease

Styles P chronology
A Gangster and a Gentleman (2002)	Time Is Money (2006)	Super Gangster (Extraordinary Gentleman) (2007)

Professional ratings
Review scores
Source	Rating
About.com	3.5/5 stars
AllMusic	4/5 stars
HipHopDX	3.5/5 stars
RapReviews.com	8/10 stars
Stylus Magazine	B−
Spin	(Favorable)
Vibe	3.5/5 stars

Time Is Money is the second studio album by American rapper Styles P, released by Interscope Records and Ruff Ryders Entertainment on December 19, 2006.

The album was originally scheduled to be released on November 14, 2006, but was delayed for a month. It peaked at number 19 on the Billboard Top R&B/Hip-Hop Albums chart, number ten on the Top Rap Albums chart, and number 79 on the Billboard 200.

"Can You Believe It", "I'm Black" and "Favorite Drug" were each released as singles. The clean version of the latter is titled "Favorite One". A leak titled "All My Life" (featuring Akon) was intended to appear on the album, but was omitted.

== Track listing ==
No.	Title	Writer(s)	Producer	Length
1.	"G-Joint" (featuring J-Hood)	David Styles; Gerald Marcelino; John Wetton; Geoff Downes	Huu Banga	3:15
2.	"Testify" (featuring Reflection Eternal)	Styles; Talib Kweli Greene; Tony Cottrell; Ray Jackson	Hi-Tek	3:26
3.	"How We Live" (featuring Jadakiss)	Styles; Kejuan Muchita	Havoc	3:53
4.	"Real Shit" (featuring Gerald Levert)	Styles; Gerald Levert; Scott Storch	Scott Storch	3:32
5.	"Who Want a Problem (Remix)" (performed by The LOX featuring Swizz Beatz)	Styles; Kasseem Dean; Jason Phillips; Sean Jacobs; Quaadir Atkinson	Neo Da Matrix	3:22
6.	"Favorite Drug" (featuring Rashad)	Styles; Rashad Thomas; Neal Conway; Crystal Waters	Rashad	3:33
7.	"Can You Believe It" (featuring Akon)	Jonathan Smith; Styles; Aliaune Thiam; Craig Love; LaMarquis Jefferson; Phillips; Kenneth Edmonds; Antonio Reid	Lil Jon	4:09
8.	"Kick It Like That" (featuring Jagged Edge)	Styles; Brian Casey; Brandon Casey; Atkinson	Neo Da Matrix	4:16
9.	"I'm Black" (featuring Marsha Ambrosius)	Styles; Marsha Ambrosius; Alan Maman	The Alchemist	3:45
10.	"Fire & Pain" (featuring Sizzla)	Styles; Miguel Collins; Randy Ousley; Mario Pizzini; Ray Middleton	Vinny Idol; Supa Mario (co.)	4:19
11.	"Burn One Down" (featuring FlipSyde)	Styles; Steve Knight; Jinho Ferriera; Ousley; Pizzini; Ray Middleton	Vinny Idol; Supa Mario	3:25
12.	"Leave a Message"	Styles; Damon Blackman	Dame Grease	3:47

Leftover tracks

- "Leaving the Game"
- "All My Life" (featuring Akon)

Sample credits

- "G-Joint" contains elements of "Only Time Will Tell", written by John Wetton and Geoff Downes, and performed by Asia.
- "Testify" contains replayed elements from "40 Days", written by Ray Jackson.
- "Favorite Drug" contains replayed elements from "Gypsy Woman", written by Neal Conway and Crystal Waters.
- "Can You Believe It" contains interpolations from the composition "Every Little Step", written by Kenneth Edmonds and Antonio Reid.

== Charts ==
=== Weekly charts ===
Chart (2006)	Peak position
US Billboard 200	79
US Top R&B/Hip-Hop Albums (Billboard)	19

=== Year-end charts ===
Chart (2007)	Position
US Top R&B/Hip-Hop Albums (Billboard)	98
