= Damani Nkosi =

Poet

- Born: Damani Nkosi Washington; Inglewood, California, U.S.
- Occupation: Rapper
- Years active: 1999-present

Damani Nkosi is an American rapper. Nkosi has worked with well-known artists including Dr. Dre, Swizz Beatz, Snoop Dogg, Pusha T and Malice of Clipse.

== Early life ==
Nkosi was brought up in Inglewood, California. He became part of Los Angeles' hip-hop underground.

== Career ==
Nkosi recorded his first track in 1999. In 2001, Nkosi was featured on Kurupt's album Space Boogie: Smoke Odyssey. He released "Move", a track featuring Pusha T and Malice in 2002. The song was featured on hip-hop radio mixshows in Los Angeles including 92.3 FM, The Beat. In 2002, he released the mixtape The Street Album.

Nkosi released Congratulations Player, a mixtape featuring the song "Gotta Stay Paid" in 2006. The song was featured on The Beat as well as Power 106. Later that year, he signed with Sony Urban Music under My Block Entertainment. In 2007, Nkosi appeared on the television series Monk. Nkosi formed the group Dubb Union (originally called Westurn Union) with Bad Lucc and producer Soopafly. Snoop Dogg signed the group under Doggy Style Records. The group toured with Snoop Dogg and released Snoop Dogg Presents: Dubb Union in 2008.

In 2009, Nkosi partnered with Adidas on its off-the-court EQT Campaign, which surrounded the relaunch of the EQT B-Ball Low. The limited edition shoes created included part of Nkosi's logo and the words "Congratulations Player" on the heel. He recorded "My Adidas" as part of the campaign. In 2010, Nkosi released a single and video, "Here Comes Damani" featuring Snoop Dogg.

Nkosi released the album On Vacation From Vacation in 2010. The album featured Snoop Dogg, Crooked I, Mitchy Slick, Mr. Short Khop and Daz Dillinger. In 2012, Nkosi left his previous record labels, took a hiatus to travel internationally. He went to China as part of a shoe design deal and was influenced by the economic gap between the rich and the poor.

Nkosi produced a single, "Now That's Love" featuring Robert Glasper and Musiq Soulchild in 2014 produced by Warryn Campbell. "Now That's Love" was the first single from his album Thoughtful King. The album included other featured artists such as PJ Morton, and BJ the Chicago Kid.

In 2015, he produced the single "Stay Black" featuring Preston Harris, Ill Camille and Aneesa Strings. Nkosi appeared in the documentary "Manchild: The Schea Cotton Story" in 2016.

== Discography ==
Year	Title	Type
1999	Space Boogie: Smoke Oddessey	Featured on album
2002	The Street Album	Mixtape
2002	"Move"	Single
2004	Jackin 4 DJ's Vol. 1	Mixtape
2004	Execution Style Vol. 1: Shots Fired	Featured on album
2005	Jackin 4 DJ's Vl. 2	Mixtape (Westurn Union)
2006	Congratulations Player	Mixtape
2006	Tha Blue Carpet Treatment	Featured on album
2007	House Shoe Music, DJ Crazy Toons	Mixtape (Westurn Union)
2008	Snoop Dogg Presents: Dubb Union	Album with Dubb Union
2009	Adidas Congratulations Player	Mixtape
2009	Malice n Wonderland	Featured on album
2010	On Vacation From Vacation	Concept album
2014	Thoughtful King	Album
2015	Stay Black	Single
