= Space Boogie: Smoke Oddessey =

Studio album by Kurupt
- Released: July 17, 2001
- Recorded: December 2000–April 2001
- Genres: West Coast hip hop; gangsta rap; hardcore hip hop
- Length: 67:07
- Labels: Antra; Artemis
- Producers: Fredwreck (also exec.); Chris Arms; Damizza; Daz Dillinger; DJ Lethal; DJ Quik; Jeeky Man; Jon B.; Mike Dean; Soopafly

Kurupt solo studio albums chronology
Tha Streetz Iz a Mutha (1999)	Space Boogie: Smoke Oddessey (2001)	Against tha Grain (2005)

Kurupt chronology
Dillinger & Young Gotti (2001)	Space Boogie: Smoke Oddessey (2001)	The Horsemen Project (2003)

Singles from Space Boogie: Smoke Oddessey
- 1. "It's Over" Released: July 2001

Professional ratings
Review scores
Source	Rating
AllMusic	3.5/5 stars
Entertainment Weekly	B+
HipHopDX	3/5
NME	4/5 stars
RapReviews	7.5/10

Space Boogie: Smoke Oddessey is the third solo studio album by American rapper Kurupt. It was released on July 17, 2001, through Antra/Artemis Records. The album was produced by Daz Dillinger, Chris Arms, Damizza, DJ Lethal, DJ Quik, Jeeky Man, Jon B., Mike Dean, Soopafly, and Fredwreck, who also served as executive producer together with Joe Marrone. It features guest appearances from Nate Dogg, Daz Dillinger, DJ Lethal, Butch Cassidy, Damani, DJ Quik, Everlast, Fred Durst, Goldie Loc, Jon B, Lil' ½ Dead, MC Ren, Natina Reed, Snoop Doggy, Soopafly, and Xzibit.

The album debuted at number ten on the Billboard 200 and at number five on the Top R&B/Hip-Hop Albums in the United States. It also reached number 75 in France, number 81 on the UK Albums Chart, and number 89 in Australia.

== Track listing ==
No.	Title	Writer(s)	Producer(s)	Length
1.	"Blast Off" (Intro)			1:50
2.	"Space Boogie" (featuring Nate Dogg)	Ricardo Brown; Nathaniel Hale; Farid Nassar	Fredwreck	4:11
3.	"Hate on Me" (featuring Soopafly and Damani)	Brown; Priest Brooks; Damani Washington	Soopafly	3:48
4.	"On da Grind" (featuring Daz Dillinger)	Brown; Delmar Arnaud; Danny E. Means	Daz Dillinger	3:39
5.	"It's Over" (featuring Natina Reed)	Brown; Natina Reed; Christopher Arms; Darrin Lockings	Charm; Jeekyman	3:24
6.	"Can't Go Wrong" (featuring DJ Quik and Butch Cassidy)	Brown; David Blake; Means	DJ Quik	4:03
7.	"On, Onsite" (featuring Lil' ½ Dead)	Brown; Donald Smith; Nassar	Fredwreck	4:19
8.	"Sunshine" (featuring Jon B.)	Brown; Jonathan Buck	Jon B.	4:52
9.	"The Hardest Mutha Fucka's" (featuring Xzibit, Nate Dogg and MC Ren)	Brown; Alvin Joiner; Hale; Lorenzo Patterson; Nassar; Sean Cruse	Fredwreck	4:31
10.	"Gangsta's"	Brown; Arnaud; Michael Dean	Daz Dillinger; Mike Dean	4:30
11.	"Bring Back That G Shit" (featuring Snoop Doggy Dogg and Goldie Loc)	Brown; Calvin Broadus; Keiwan Spillman; Nassar; Traci Nelson; Cruse	Fredwreck	4:30
12.	"Lay It On Back" (featuring Fred Durst, DJ Lethal and Nate Dogg)	Brown; William Durst; Hale; Nassar; Cruse	Fredwreck	3:59
13.	"Just Don't Give a Fuck" (featuring DJ Lethal)	Brown; Leor Dimant	DJ Lethal	5:00
14.	"At It Again"	Brown; Damion Young; Gene Griffin; Johnny Kemp; Howie Hersh; Teddy Riley; Aaron Hall	Damizza	3:33
15.	"Kuruption" (featuring Everlast)	Brown; Erik Schrody; Nassar	Fredwreck	5:53
16.	"Fuck da World" (featuring Daz Dillinger)	Brown; Arnaud; Nassar	Fredwreck	5:05
Total length:				1:07:11

Bonus track
No.	Title	Writer(s)	Producer(s)	Length
17.	"Bitches" (featuring Roscoe and Butch Cassidy)	Brown; David Williams; Means; Young; Hersh	Damizza	3:34

Best Buy added value track
No.	Title	Writer(s)	Producer(s)	Length
17.	"The Life I Live" (featuring Krook)	Brown; Kevin Strickland; John Stary; John Hiersekorn	Fingazz; John Hiersekorn	5:18

Transworld added value track
No.	Title	Writer(s)	Producer(s)	Length
17.	"Have Fun" (featuring Tha Alkaholiks)	Brown; Eric Brooks; James Robinson; Rico Smith	E-Swift	4:24

Notes

- Track 1 also listed as "Countdown" on some editions.

Sample credits

- Track 14 contains samples of "Just Got Paid", written by Gene Griffin and Johnny Kemp and performed by Johnny Kemp.

== Personnel ==
- Ricardo "Kurupt" Brown – vocals
- Nathaniel "Nate Dogg" Hale – vocals (tracks: 2, 9, 12)
- Priest "Soopafly" Brooks – vocals & producer (track 3), keyboards (track 15)
- Damani Nkosi Washington – vocals (track 3)
- Delmar "Daz Dillinger" Arnaud – vocals (tracks: 4, 16), producer (tracks: 4, 10)
- Natina Reed – vocals (track 5)
- Anita McCloud – vocals (track 5)
- David "DJ Quik" Blake – vocals & producer (track 6)
- Danny "Butch Cassidy" Means – vocals (track 6)
- Donald "Lil' ½ Dead" Smith – vocals (track 7)
- Jonathan "Jon B." Buck – vocals & producer (track 8)
- Alvin "Xzibit" Joiner – vocals (track 9)
- Lorenzo "MC Ren" Patterson – vocals (track 9)
- Calvin "Snoop Dogg" Broadus – vocals (track 11)
- Keiwan "Goldie Loc" Spillman – vocals (track 11)
- Traci Nelson – vocals (tracks: 11, 16)
- Jerry Buddy "Kokane" Long, Jr. – vocals (track 11)
- William Frederick "Fred" Durst – vocals (track 12)
- Erik "Everlast" Schrody – vocals & guitar (track 15)
- Dominique Gonzales – vocals (track 15)
- Farid "Fredwreck" Nassar – guitar (track 2), harpsichord (track 7), keyboards (tracks: 9, 11, 12, 15), producer (tracks: 2, 7, 9, 11, 12, 15, 16), recording (tracks: 2, 11, 16), mixing (tracks: 2, 7, 11, 15, 16), executive producer
- The Velvet Orchestra – strings (track 2)
- Sean Cruse – guitar (tracks: 7, 9, 11, 12), bass (tracks: 9, 11)
- Tim Kobza – guitar (track 8)
- Jason Schweitzer – flute & engineering assistant (track 9), recording & mixing (track 13)
- Leor "DJ Lethal" Dimant – scratches (tracks: 12, 13), producer (track 13)
- Christian Olde Wolbers – bass (track 12)
- Anthony Mazza – guitar (track 14)
- Stevie Blacke – violin (track 16)
- Christopher "Charm" Arms – producer & recording (track 5)
- Darrin "Jeeky Man" Lockings – producer & recording (track 5)
- Mike Dean – producer & mixing (track 10)
- Damion "Damizza" Young – producer (track 14)
- Richard "Segal" Huredia – recording (tracks: 2, 9, 12, 16), mixing (tracks: 2, 8, 9, 12, 15, 16)
- Tim Nitz – recording (tracks: 3, 15), mixing (track 3)
- Michael Tarsia – mixing (track 5)
- Regula Mirz – recording (track 7), engineering assistant (track 16)
- Florian Ammon – Pro Tools programming (track 14)
- Michael Schlesinger – recording & mixing (track 14)
- James McCrone – engineering assistant (track 2)
- Farah Fima – engineering assistant (track 11)
- Brian "Big Bass" Gardner – mastering
- Joe Marrone – executive producer
- Glenn Orenstein – design, additional photography
- Mick Rock – photography
- Sean Bouldin – A&R
- Darryl Lindsey – production manager

== Charts ==
Chart performance for Space Boogie: Smoke Oddessey
Chart (2001)	Peak position
Australian Albums (ARIA)	89
French Albums (SNEP)	75
UK Albums (Official Charts)	81
UK R&B Albums (Official Charts)	16
UK Independent Albums (Official Charts)	12
US Billboard 200	10
US Top R&B/Hip-Hop Albums (Billboard)	5
US Independent Albums (Billboard)	1
