= Hi-Teknology =

Studio album by Hi-Tek
- Released: May 8, 2001
- Recorded: 2000–2001
- Genre: Hip hop
- Label: Rawkus/Priority/EMI Records
- Producer: Hi-Tek

Hi-Tek chronology
Train Of Thought (2000)	Hi-Teknology (2001)	Hi-Teknology 2: The Chip (2006)

Singles from Hi-Teknology
- 1. "Round & Round" Released: 2001; 2. "The Sun God" Released: 2001

Professional ratings
Review scores
Source	Rating
AllMusic	3/5 stars
Entertainment Weekly	A−
The Guardian	4/5 stars
HipHopDX	3.5/5 stars
RapReviews	7.5/10
Vibe	3.5/5 stars

Hi-Teknology is the debut album from producer Hi-Tek, released on Rawkus Records. Most songs feature rapping or singing by other artists, and all are produced by Hi-Tek. A sequel, Hi-Teknology 2, was made for MCA Records but never released; a second Hi-Teknology 2 was recorded and released on Babygrande Records.

== Track listing ==
All songs produced by Hi-Tek.

No.	Title	Length
1.	"Scratch Rappin'"	2:04
2.	"The Sun God" (featuring Common & Vinia Mojica)	4:34
3.	"Get Back, Pt. II" (featuring DCQ, Talib Kweli)	3:46
4.	"Breakin' Bread" (featuring Brian Digby Jr., Crunch, Donte, Main Flow)	3:53
5.	"All I Need Is You" (featuring Cormega & Jonell)	3:39
6.	"Where I'm From" (featuring Jinx Da Juvy)	3:11
7.	"Tony Guitar Watson"	1:00
8.	"Round & Round" (featuring Jonell)	3:30
9.	"Get Ta Steppin'" (featuring Mos Def & Vinia Mojica)	4:37
10.	"Theme From Hi-Tek" (featuring Talib Kweli.)	1:48
11.	"L.T.A.H." (Featuring Slum Village)	3:52
12.	"Suddenly" (featuring - Donte, Main Flow)	3:25
13.	"The Illest It Gets" (featuring Buckshot)	4:24
14.	"Hi-Teknology" (featuring Jonell)	1:38

Samples

Breakin' Bread

- "Rejected" by Elmer Bernstein
- "Beats to the Rhyme" by Run-DMC
- "Body Rock" by Mos Def, Q-Tip and Tash

All I Need Is You

- "Hall of Mirrors" by Kraftwerk

Round & Round

- "Burlesque in Barcelona" by Jakob Magnússon

Theme From Hi-Tek

- "Mas Que Nada (Pow, Pow, Pow)" by Warren Kime

Suddenly

- "Vole Vole Farandole" by Paul Mauriat

== Chart positions ==
=== Album ===
Chart (2001)	Peak position
US Billboard 200	66
US Top R&B/Hip Hop Albums	12

=== Singles ===
Year	Song	Chart positions		
Year	Song	Hot 100	R&B/Hip-Hop	Rap
2001	"The Sun God"	—	77	5
2002	"Round & Round"	62	13	1
