= Doom (album) =

Studio album by Mood
- Released: September 23, 1997
- Recorded: 1996–1997
- Studio: Platinum Island Studios, New York City, New York
- Genre: Underground hip hop
- Length: 62:04
- Label: TVT/ Blunt Recordings
- Producer: Hi-Tek; Jahson

Professional ratings
Review scores
Source	Rating
AllMusic	4/5 stars

Doom is the debut studio album by American hip hop group Mood. Released on September 23, 1997, the album features production by Hi-Tek and guest appearances by Talib Kweli and Wu-Tang-affiliated group Sunz of Man. It features one single, "Karma", whose b-side is "Cincinnati". Doom launched the careers of Talib Kweli, Hi-Tek, and Lone Catalysts. Producer J.Rawls of Lone Catalysts is also experiencing commercial success as a soloist in Europe and Japan.

== Track listing ==
No.	Title	Producer(s)	Length
1.	"Esoteric Manuscripts" (Mood)	Jahson	4:03
2.	"Info For The Streets" (Mood)	Hi-Tek	3:50
3.	"He Is DJ Hi-Tek" (Hi-Tek)	Hi-Tek	0:40
4.	"Karma" (Mood)	Hi-Tek	3:18
5.	"The Vision" (Mood)	Jahson	4:56
6.	"Tunnel Bound" (Mood)	Hi-Tek	4:38
7.	"Nuclear Hip-Hop" (Mood, Talib Kweli)	Jahson	4:18
8.	"Anotha Day" (Mood)	Jahson	3:11
9.	"Sacred Pt. I" (Mood, Talib Kweli)	Jahson	4:48
10.	"Peddlers of Doom" (Mood, Talib Kweli)	Jahson	4:59
11.	"Millennium" (Mood)	Hi-Tek	3:44
12.	"Babylon the Great" (Jahson)	Jahson	0:28
13.	"Peace Infinity" (Mood, Talib Kweli)	Jahson	3:50
14.	"Secrets of the Sand" (Mood, Darryl Irby)	Jahson	3:21
15.	"Illuminated Sunlight" (Mood, Sunz of Man)	Hi-Tek	5:02
16.	"Industry Lies" (Mood, Reflection Eternal)	Hi-Tek	2:41
17.	"No Ordinary Brother" (Hi-Tek)	Hi-Tek	0:32
18.	"Cincinnati" (Mood, Holmskillet)	Hi-Tek	3:45
