= Vinia Mojica =

American hip hop musician

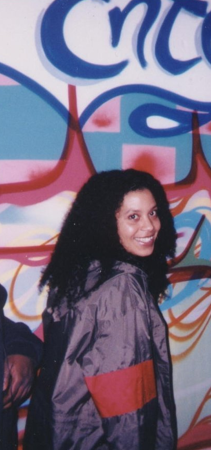
- Mojica in 2000

Background information
- Born: Vinia A. Mojica; March 14, 1970 (age 56); Queens, New York, U.S.
- Genres: Hip hop, R&B
- Occupations: Singer, songwriter
- Years active: 1989–2003 (active); 2003–present (unknown)
- Labels: Fruitmeat, Giant Step

Vinia A. Mojica (born March 14, 1970) is an American singer from Queens, New York. She is best known for her collaborations with the Native Tongues collective and other hip hop artists.

== Life and career ==
Her recording career began in 1989 with the song "Acknowledge Your Own History" from the Jungle Brothers' 1989 album Done by the Forces of Nature. It was the beginning of her association with the Native Tongues Posse — which would produce De La Soul's 1991 hit "A Roller Skating Jam Named "Saturdays"" — and continue with A Tribe Called Quest and later with its second generation of Mos Def, Talib Kweli, Hi-Tek and Common.

Mojica also made numerous appearances on Heavy D's album Nuttin' But Love (1995) and his 1997 single "Water Bed Hev"; collaborated with the French hip hop group Alliance Ethnik in 1995 and 1998; and made guest appearances on albums by Heltah Skeltah, Rahzel, and Pete Rock. Outside of hip hop, she has also recorded and performed with Mary J. Blige, Youssou N'Dour and Arto Lindsay, as well as downtempo artists like Cibo Matto, DJ Spinna, and, in 2005, Jneiro Jarel. In 2002, Mojica collaborated with French hip hop and electro artist DJ Mehdi (credited as Espion) on "Anything Is Possible", a track later remixed by Château Flight.

She worked and toured with pianist Andy Milne in his band as a lead vocalist.

In 2003, Mojica finally released her debut single, "Guilt Junkie" (with the B-side "Sands of Time").

== Discography ==
Singles

- "Magnificent" (2002) (with Mos Def)
- "Guilt Junkie" b/w "Sands of Time" (2003)

Guest appearances

- A Tribe Called Quest – "Verses from the Abstract" from The Low End Theory (1991)
- De La Soul – "A Roller Skating Jam Named 'Saturdays'"; "Keepin' the Faith" from De La Soul is Dead (1991)
- Pete Rock & CL Smooth – "Searching" from The Main Ingredient (1994)
- Alliance Ethnik – "Honesty & jalousie"; "Respect" from "Honesty et Jalousie (fais un choix dans la vie) (1995)
- Heltah Skeltah – "Therapy" from Nocturnal (1996)
- Pete Rock – "Mind Blowin'" from Soul Survivor (1998)
- Black Star – "K.O.S. (Determination)" from Mos Def & Talib Kweli Are Black Star (1998)
- Mos Def – "Climb" from Black on Both Sides (1999)
- Alliance Ethnik – "Fat Come Back", "Tu Sais Quoi", and "5 Heures Du Mat" from Fat Comeback (1999)
- Reflection Eternal – "The Blast" from Train of Thought (2000)
- Da Beatminerz – "Take That" from Brace 4 Impak (2001)
- Hi-Tek – "The Sun God"; "Get Ta Steppin'" from Hi-Teknology (2001)
- Talib Kweli – "Stand to the Side" from Quality (2002)
- DJ Mehdi – "Anything Is Possible" from (The Story of) Espion (2002)
- Common – "Ferris Wheel" from Electric Circus (2002)
- DJ Spinna – "Idols" from Here to There (2003)
- Wildchild - "Party Up" from Secondary Protocol (2003)
