= Jonell =

American singer (born 1977)

- Born: Shannon Jonell Showes; February 20, 1977 (age 48); Cincinnati, Ohio, U.S.
- Genres: R&B
- Occupation: Singer
- Years active: 2001–2005
- Labels: Def Soul

Shanonn Jonell Showes, better known as Jonell (born February 20, 1977), is an American contemporary R&B singer.

In 2001, Jonell was introduced with her first hit Round and Round on producer Hi-Tek's album Hi-Teknology, the remix featuring a guest appearance from Method Man soon landed on the How High soundtrack. Later in 2003, Jonell was set to release her debut album "Know Me" on the Def Soul label. Her first single So Whassup featured a guest appearance by Redman. However, the album was never released, and in 2005, her webpage on the Def Soul website was no longer accessible.

She resurfaced in late 2005 with a blog on MySpace, where she talked about working on her new album which never materialized.

== Discography ==
=== Albums ===
- Know Me (2003) (shelved)

=== Singles ===
Year	Title	Billboard chart	Peak position
2001	Round & Round	Hot R&B/Hip-Hop Singles & Tracks	13
2002	Round & Round	Hot Rap Singles	1
2002	Round & Round	Billboard Hot 100	62
