= Mood (band) =

American hip hop group

MOOD
- Also known as: Three Below Zero
- Origin: Cincinnati, Ohio, U.S.
- Genres: Hip-Hop
- Years active: 1993–present
- Labels: Blunt Recordings/TVT; Mission Control; Below-Zero Records; Back 2 Da Source Records
- Members: Main Flow; Donte; Jahson

MOOD is a hip hop group based in Cincinnati, Ohio, United States, featuring rappers Main Flow and Donte, as well as record producer DJ Jahson. Originally formed under the name of Three Below Zero, they wound up changing their name to Mood in 1994. They first came to prominence with the Hi-Tek produced single "Hustle on the Side" in 1996. Their 1997 debut album Doom featured production by a young Hi-Tek and a guest appearance by Talib Kweli.

In 2000, they appeared on "Mission Control Presents", a compilation which featured acts associated with producer Jahson and his record label Mission Control. There were three Mood tracks and three tracks that featured Mood as part of a larger group called Elite Terrorist. Main Flow and Donte are also featured individually on a number of tracks.

Music videos for songs "Hustle On The Side" and "Karma" were produced and aired worldwide. Most notably winning awards on regional and international video programs Video Music Box, Urban Reality, Rap City and DrunkinStyle TV.

In 2011, Mood released their long-awaited follow up to Doom, entitled Live Again. In the interim, Jahson has an album out as does Main Flow (entitled Flow Season along with 7L), Donte is also planning a solo release.

== Discography ==
=== Mood ===
- Doom (1997)
- Mission Control Presents: Prehistoric Sounds feat. Mood (2000)
- Live Again (2011)
- Into The Mood (with Mil Beats) (2015)
- Mood – Unreleased 93-95 (2016)

=== Main Flow ===
- Castle Diplomat (2001)
- Hip-Hopulation (2004)
- Notebook Assassins (2005)
- Flow Season (with 7L) (2006)
- Return of the Castle (2010)
- "The Cincinnati Kid" (2014)
- "Sound Of Silence" (with Mil Beats) (2018)

=== Donte ===
Aka “Donte The Gr8”

- ”TayDilla” (2018)

Full LP produced by Legendary hiphop producer “J-Dilla”

- ”Planet Chaos”

Full LP (2022) “Donte The Gr8 & Speed Walton” Are “Space Invadaz”

- ”Donte Presents

Nasty Boys” Full LP (2007) featuring various artist

- "The Human Element" (with Reflection Eternal) (2000)

=== The Flowfessionals ===
- Main Flow Presents: The Flowfessionals (2005)
