= Mos Def & Talib Kweli Are Black Star =

Studio album by Black Star
- Released: September 29, 1998
- Recorded: September 1997 – May 1998
- Studio: Unique Recording (New York)
- Genres: East Coast hip-hop; alternative hip-hop; conscious rap; underground hip-hop; progressive rap
- Length: 50:11
- Labels: Rawkus; Priority
- Producers: Shawn J. Period; Hi-Tek; Ge-ology; 88-Keys; J. Rawls; Da Beatminerz

Black Star chronology
Mos Def & Talib Kweli Are Black Star (1998)	No Fear of Time (2022)

Mos Def chronology
Mos Def & Talib Kweli Are Black Star (1998)	Black on Both Sides (1999)

Talib Kweli chronology
Mos Def & Talib Kweli Are Black Star (1998)	Train of Thought (2000)

Singles from Mos Def & Talib Kweli Are Black Star
- 1. "Definition" Released: August 26, 1998; 2. "Respiration" Released: February 23, 1999

Mos Def & Talib Kweli Are Black Star (often referred to as Black Star) is the debut studio album by American hip hop duo Black Star, composed of rappers Talib Kweli and Yasiin Bey (then known as Mos Def). The album was released on September 29, 1998, to critical acclaim. The title is a reference to the Black Star Line, a shipping line founded by Pan-Africanist Marcus Garvey. The album deals with modern-day issues, philosophical ideas, and life in Brooklyn, New York City as the two artists know it.

== Background ==
The album came to fruition from the chemistry between the two emcees. Both planned to release their solo albums around the same time, but they postponed their individual projects and decided instead to collaborate on a full-length LP. The album's cover was designed by artist Brent Rollins.

== Music and lyrics ==
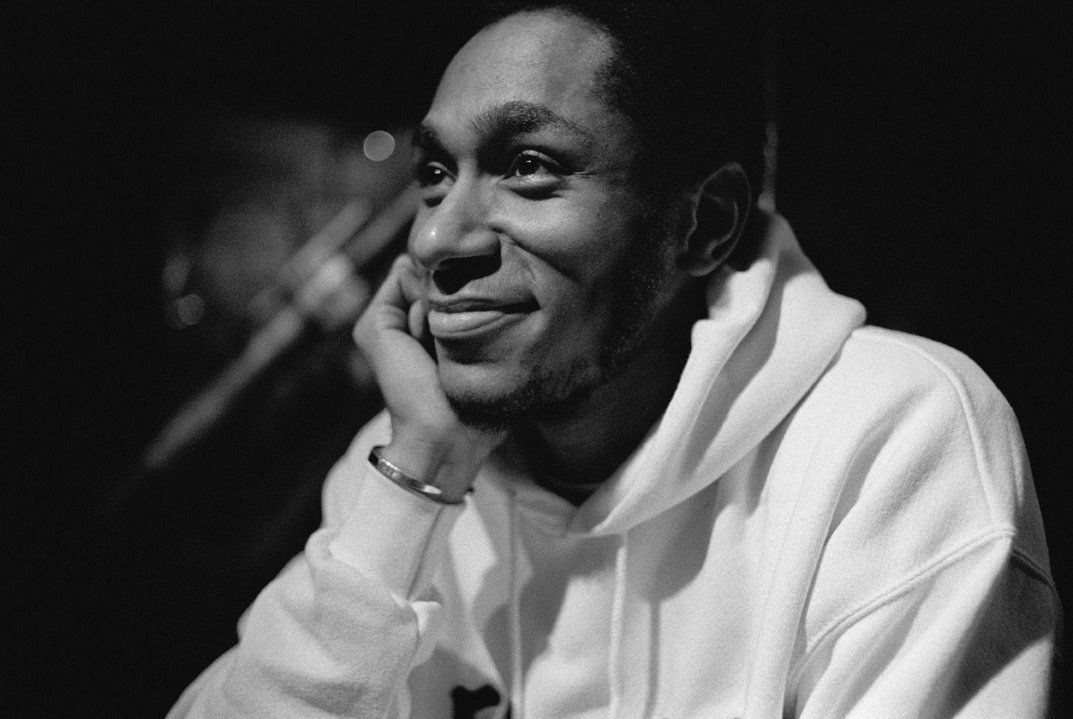
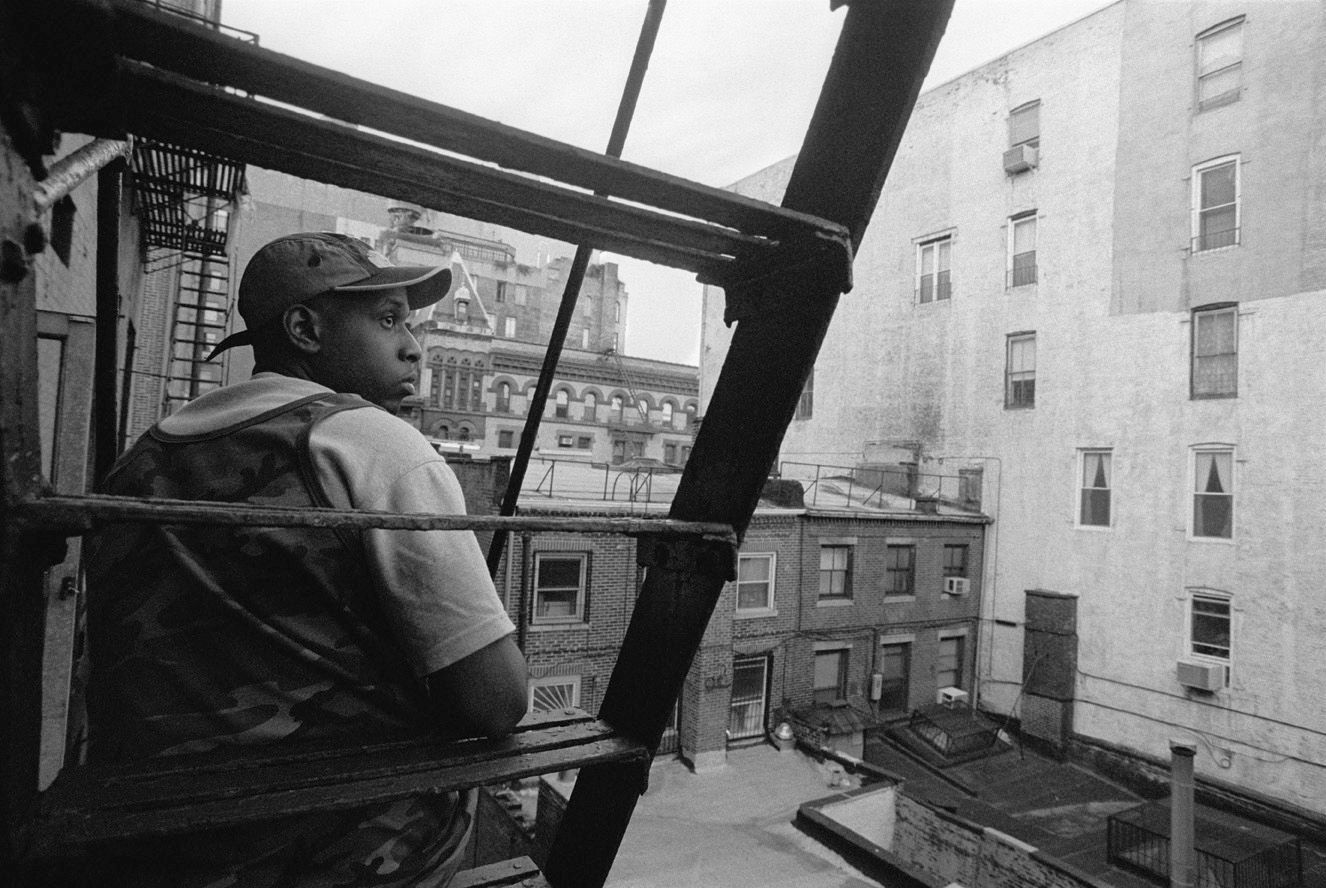
Mos Def (left) and Talib Kweli (right) in 1999

The late jazz musician Weldon Irvine played the keys on the album's opening song, "Astronomy," which interprets the word "black" in a positive way, and contains similes such as "Black, like my baby girl's hair". The next song, and first single, "Definition", is a stern response to hip hop's fascination with death, and a dedication to slain emcees Tupac Shakur and the Notorious B.I.G. As the chorus says, "One two three/It's kinda dangerous to be a MC/They shot 2Pac and Biggie/Too much violence in hip hop, Y-O". The chorus is also a play on Boogie Down Productions' anti-gun song "Stop the Violence", as well as "Remix For P Is Free" from their album Criminal Minded. "Children's Story" is a re-imagined version of Slick Rick's original, which features Mos Def cautioning overly materialistic pursuits.

"Brown-Skin Lady" is an affectionate tribute to brown-skinned women. The song encourages black and brown women to be proud of their hair and complexion, and to not be influenced by Western beauty standards. Kweli rhymes, "We're not dealin' with the European standard of beauty tonight/Turn off the TV and put the magazine away/Look in the mirror tell me what you see/I see the evidence of divine presence."

"Thieves in the Night" was inspired by author Toni Morrison's novel The Bluest Eye. In the album's liner notes, Kweli explains that the paragraph "struck me as one of the truest critiques of our society, and I read that in high school when I was 15 years old. I think it is especially true in the world of hip hop, because we get blinded by these illusions." The excerpt interpolated in the song is: "And fantasy it was, for we were not strong, only aggressive; we were not free, merely licensed; we were not compassionate, we were polite; not good but well-behaved. We courted death in order to call ourselves brave, and hid like thieves from life." And the version on the track: "Not strong, only aggressive/Not free, we only licensed/Not compassionate, only polite (now who the nicest?)/Not good but well-behaved/Chasin' after death so we could call ourselves brave, still livin' like mental slaves/Hiding like thieves in the night from life/Illusions of oasis making you look twice."

== Critical reception ==
Professional ratings
Review scores
Source	Rating
AllMusic	5/5 stars
Encyclopedia of Popular Music	4/5 stars
Entertainment Weekly	A−
Muzik	4/5 stars
NME	8/10
Rolling Stone	3/5 stars
The Rolling Stone Album Guide	4/5 stars
The Source	3.5/5 stars
Spin	10/10
The Village Voice	A−

Black Star was voted the 24th best album of 1998 in the Pazz & Jop, a poll of American critics nationwide published annually by The Village Voice. Robert Christgau, the poll's creator, wrote in a contemporary review that Mos Def and Talib Kweli "devise a hip hop imaginary where hater players lose their girls-not-bitches to MCs so disinterested they give 'em right back. The rhymes are the selling point. But the subculture that cares most about these words is what you'll come back to." According to Encyclopedia of Popular Music writer Colin Larkin, the album abandoned "the negativity of gangsta rap" in favor of "a highly intelligent and searching examination of black culture, harking back to the classic era of rap epitomized by Public Enemy and KRS-One. The album's sparse, hard-hitting rhythms were also in marked comparison to the overblown productions of Puff Daddy, which dominated the rap mainstream."

== Track listing ==
No.	Title	Producer(s)	Length
1.	"Intro"	Hi-Tek; Talib Kweli (co.)	1:11
2.	"Astronomy (8th Light)" (featuring Weldon Irvine)	Da Beatminerz	3:23
3.	"Definition"	Hi-Tek	3:26
4.	"Re: Definition"	Hi-Tek	3:02
5.	"Children's Story"	Shawn J. Period	3:32
6.	"Brown Skin Lady"	J. Rawls	5:46
7.	"B Boys Will B Boys"	Ge-ology	2:36
8.	"K.O.S. (Determination)" (featuring Vinia Mojica)	Hi-Tek	4:49
9.	"Hater Players"	Shawn J. Period	4:08
10.	"Yo Yeah"	J. Rawls; Talib Kweli (co.)	1:10
11.	"Respiration" (featuring Common)	Hi-Tek	6:05
12.	"Thieves in the Night"	88-Keys	5:16
13.	"Twice Inna Lifetime" (featuring Jane Doe, Wordsworth, and Punchline)	Hi-Tek	5:38

== Album singles ==
Single information
"Definition"
- Released: August 26, 1998
- B-side: "Twice Inna Lifetime" (featuring Jane Doe, Punchline & Wordsworth)
"Respiration" (featuring Common)
- Released: February 23, 1999
- B-side: "Respiration (Flying High Mix)"

== Personnel ==
- Hi-Tek – Producer, Cut, Crowd Noise
- Weldon Irvine – Keyboards, performer
- Jim Godsey – Engineer
- Charlie Mack – Engineer
- Kieran Walsh – Engineer, Mixing
- Vinia Mojica – Performer
- DJ Evil Dee – Cut
- Jane Doe – Performer
- Rick St. Hillaire – Mixing
- Steve Souder – Mixing
- Chris Athens – Mastering
- Ken "Duro" Ifill – Mixing
- Eddie Otchere – Photography
- Vaughn Sessions – Engineer
- Mr. Walt – Producer, engineer, Mixing
- Success – Engineer
- Brent Rollins – Artwork, Cover art
- Mos Def – Fender Rhodes, performer
- Black Star – Artwork, Art Direction
- Talib Kweli – Producer, performer
- Marcus Garvey – Photography
- Ge-ology – Producer, Crowd Noise
- 88-Keys – Producer
- Pat Viola – Engineer
- Jake Septimus – Photography
- Tasleem – Photography
- Richard Mason – Crowd Noise
- J. Rawls – Producer
- Kieran Dee – Photography/Banter/Dietician

== Chart positions ==
=== Weekly charts ===
Chart (1998)	Peak position
US Billboard 200	53
US Top R&B/Hip-Hop Albums (Billboard)	13

=== Singles ===
Song	Chart (1998)	Peak position
"Definition"	US Billboard Hot 100	60
"Definition"	US Hot R&B/Hip-Hop Songs (Billboard)	31
"Definition"	US Hot Rap Songs (Billboard)	3
"Respiration"	US Billboard Hot 100	77
"Respiration"	US Hot R&B/Hip-Hop Songs (Billboard)	54
