= Dion Jenkins =

American singer-songwriter

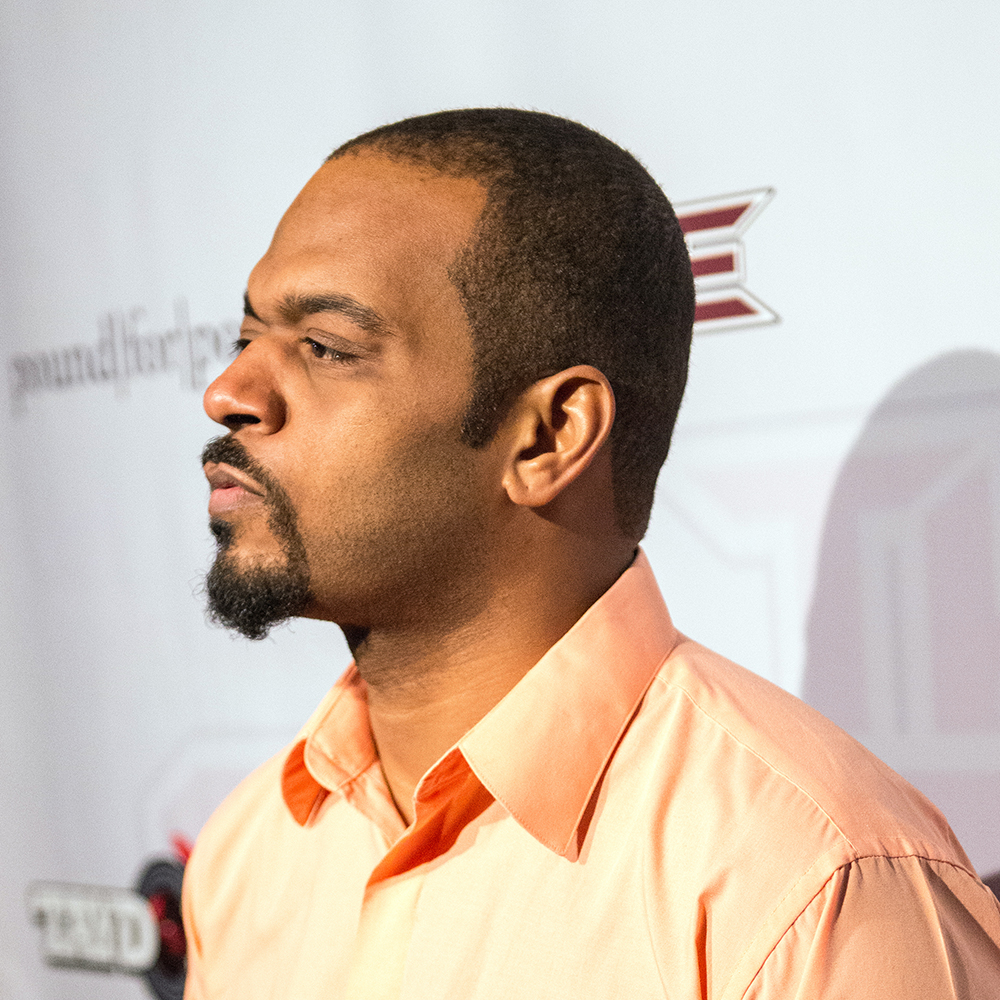
- Dion Jenkins at The Game's The Documentary 10-year Anniversary Concert in Los Angeles

Background information
- Also known as: Deion
- Born: Dion Keith Jenkins; September 21, 1979 (age 47); Cincinnati, Ohio, US
- Genres: R&B; hip hop
- Occupations: Singer; songwriter; actor
- Instrument: Vocals
- Years active: 1999–present
- Labels: Aftermath; Island; The Golden West

Dion Keith Jenkins (born September 21, 1979 and known mononymously as Dion) is an American singer-songwriter and record producer. He is known for his collaborations with Aftermath Entertainment artists The Game, 50 Cent and Young Buck. He has also worked with several other prominent rappers, such as Talib Kweli, Bishop Lamont, 213 (Snoop Dogg, Warren G, Nate Dogg), Xzibit, and Freeway among others.

== Early life ==
Jenkins was born and raised in Cincinnati, Ohio. Jenkins attended Central State University where he earned a degree in Performance Music.

== Music career ==
Dion's first foray into the industry was via the R&B group Jonz, who released a record in 1999, henceforth gaining notoriety on BET's "The Way We Do It" but it wasn't until being brought on board via an audition with Cincinnati-based producer Hi-Tek sponsored by Def Jam Recordings and MCA Records, that solidified his position as a well-recognized hip hop crooner. Shortly thereafter Dion gained the attention of West Coast hip hop producer Dr. Dre, who invited him to work with The Game for Game's debut album The Documentary.

His Twitter and YouTube moniker is DeionTheFuture.

== Discography ==
=== Studio albums ===
- Throwback Joints (Album) (2022) released on Spotify
- Break the Circle (TBA 2018)
- Time Wasted (2016)
- Hi-Teknology²: The Chip (2006)
- Don't Stop (2004)
- Aftermath Album (Unreleased)
- Jonz (Album) (1999)

== Music videos ==
List of music videos, with directors, showing year released
Title	Year	Director(s)
"Hold On" (Deion)	2017	Eric Heights
"Signtology" (EMC)	2015	Parris Stewart
"Live it Up" (Bigg Kutta feat Freeway)	2012	Drive by Productions
