= Kendra Ross =

American musician

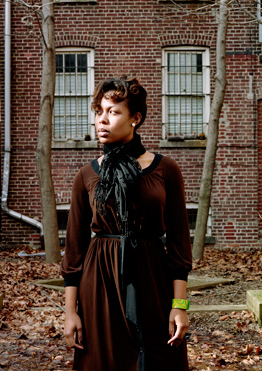
- Kendra Ross, in 2008

Background information
- Born: Kendra Janelle Ross; December 4, 1975 (age 50); Youngstown, Ohio, U.S.
- Genres: R&B, soul, neo soul, jazz, gospel, hip hop
- Occupations: Singer-songwriter, record producer, music business executive, social activist
- Years active: 1997–present
- Label: Lola's Child
- Website: kendraross.com

Kendra Janelle Ross (born December 4, 1975) is an American singer-songwriter, record producer, music business executive, and community organizer from Pittsburgh, Pennsylvania. She was born in Youngstown, Ohio.

== Career ==
She got her start singing in church and performing with the Civic Light Opera Mini Stars of Pittsburgh. After many years of working in musical theater, Ross went on to work as a vocalist and songwriter with artists such as Quincy Jones, Kanye West, Talib Kweli, Idle Warship, Res, Omar, Faith Evans, Rita Coolidge, Tamar-kali and many more. She has appeared on NBC's Today and BET's 106 & Park and has been featured in O, The Oprah Magazine. Ross has opened for musicians Babyface and Isaac Hayes.

Ross' debut album titled New Voice was released in June 2007. The album was co-produced with longtime collaborator/music director Christian Ver Halen and features appearances by Talib Kweli, Eric Roberson, and more. Many touring and session musicians are also featured on the album, including Teodross Avery (Amy Winehouse), Maurice Brown (Wynton Marsalis), Lonnie Plaxico (Cassandra Wilson), Chris Rob (John Legend), Daniel Sadownick (Matisyahu), and Skoota Warner (Santana). The album has been well received in the U.S. and Japan where it was released by P-Vine Records in December 2007.

Ross won for New Artist of the Year at the 2007 SoulTracks Readers' Choice Awards in Detroit on November 16, 2007.

Hip hop recording artist Talib Kweli wrote in the liner notes of his 2002 album Quality (on which she wrote and performed): "Kendra's talented, beautiful, and one of a kind."

Ross is also an independent feminist scholar and cultural anthropologist who cites Zora Neale Hurston and Katherine Dunham as two of her greatest academic influences. She received a Bachelor of Music from New York University and a Master of Arts in Liberal Studies from Brooklyn College and another in Anthropology from The New School for Social Research in New York City. She also holds a PhD in Community Engagement from Point Park University.

Ross is set to release a new EP of original music in 2024.

== Discography and appearances ==
- 1997 Encore/Ill Advised [background vocals]
- 1997 Never Put U Down/Rahsheed [background vocals]
- 2000 Train of Thought/Reflection Eternal (Talib Kweli & Hi-Tek) [lead and background vocals]
- 2001 Too Close/A Hundred Birds(Japan)[songwriter; background vocals]
- 2002 Quality/Talib Kweli [songwriting; featured and background vocals]
- 2003 Space Under Sun/Ari Gold [songwriting; featured and background vocals]
- 2004 Beautiful Struggle/Talib Kweli [songwriting]
- 2005 Right About Now/Talib Kweli [background vocals]
- 2005 Rawkus Records Best of Decade I 1995–2005 [vocals]
- 2006 Live Shot/The Rooftop [featured vocals]
- 2007 Kendra Ross/New Voice (debut album) [executive producer, co-producer, arranger, and lead and background vocals]
- 2007 Art of Life/Charon Don [background vocals]
- 2007 Eardrum/Talib Kweli [background vocals]
- 2010 Q: Soul Bossa Nostra/Quincy Jones [featured and background vocals]
- 2010 Sleeping Beauty: You Are the One You've Been Waiting On/Abby Dobson [background vocals]
- 2011 Gutter Rainbows/Talib Kweli [songwriting; featured and background vocals; production coordination]
- 2011 Habits of the Heart/Idle Warship (Talib Kweli & Res) [songwriting; background vocals]
- 2014 Enough to Go Around [co-producer, arranger, and lead and background vocals]
- 2014 Prisoner of Conscious LIVE/Talib Kweli [background vocals]
- 2015 F--- The Money/Talib Kweli [songwriting/featured vocalist]
- 2015 Indie 500/9th Wonder & Talib Kweli [featured vocalist]
- 2017 Heads Up Eyes Open/Talib Kweli ft. Rick Ross & Yummy Bingham [background vocalist/background arrangements]
- 2020 Kendra Ross/You Don’t Know What Love Is [cover/single]
- 2024 Kendra Ross/Hideous Want [single]
- 2025 Kendra Ross/This Womanist's Work EP [FORTHCOMING]
- 2025 Kendra Ross/Sister Americana EP [FORTHCOMING]
