= Hi-Tek =

American rapper and producer

- Also known as: Tekzilla
- Born: Tony Louis Cottrell; May 5, 1976 (age 50); Cincinnati, Ohio, U.S.
- Genres: Hip hop
- Occupations: Rapper; producer
- Years active: 1996–present
- Labels: Hi-Tek Productions, Inc.; Rawkus; Babygrande; Aftermath
- Member of: Reflection Eternal

Tony Louis Cottrell (born May 5, 1976), better known as Hi-Tek, is an American rapper and music producer from Cincinnati, Ohio. He is best known for his work with Talib Kweli as the duo Reflection Eternal. His father is singer Willie Cottrell of the Willie Cottrell Band, whom Hi-Tek featured on his second album, Hi-Teknology 2.

== Career ==
=== 1996–2000 ===
Hi-Tek grew up in the West End, Cincinnati. He started his career with hip hop group Mood and had a regional hit with "Hustle on the Side". That song was made for Mood's album Doom, which featured amongst others Brooklyn MC Talib Kweli. Hi-Tek went on to produce most of Talib Kweli and Mos Def's Black Star (1998). In 2000, Tek and Kweli (under the name Reflection Eternal) released Train of Thought (2000) on Rawkus Records, with raps by Kweli and beats by Hi-Tek. It enjoyed moderate crossover radio success with the singles "The Blast" and "Move Somethin'". Reflection Eternal released a follow-up album titled Revolutions Per Minute on May 18, 2010.

=== 2001–present ===
After signing to Rawkus Records, Hi-Tek produced for a number of the labels projects, including the popular Soundbombing series; a three-record compilation of mostly Rawkus-based artists. In 2001, he released his solo album Hi-Teknology on Rawkus. The album featured appearances by Mos Def, Talib Kweli, Common, Vinia Mojica, Buckshot, and others, with all production handled by Hi-Tek. It received critical acclaim and spawned a minor hit, "Round and Round" with Cincinnati singer Jonell.

Hi-Tek is a staff producer for Aftermath Entertainment and its affiliates, as well as past associates such as Kweli and Mos Def. He has also recorded songs for Dion Jenkins, an R&B singer signed to Aftermath. Hi-Teknology 2 was released October 17, 2006, on Babygrande, and distributed by Koch Entertainment. The producer released the third installment, Hi-Teknology 3: Underground on December 11, 2007.

In November 2015, producer 9th Wonder announced Hi-Tek as the newest member of The Soul Council – the production staff of his record label It's a Wonderful World Music Group.

== Discography ==
=== Albums ===
Album information
Train of Thought (by Reflection Eternal with Talib Kweli)
- Released: October 17, 2000
- Billboard 200 chart position: #17
- R&B/Hip-Hop chart position: #5
- Singles: "The Express"/"Some Kind of Wonderful", "Move Somethin'"/"Good Mourning" & "The Blast"/"Down for the Count"/"Train of Thought", "Down for the Count"
Hi-Teknology
- Released: May 8, 2001
- Billboard 200 chart position: #66
- R&B/Hip-Hop chart position: #12
- Singles: "Round & Round"/"All I Need Is You", "The Sun God"/"Get Back Pt. 2"
Hi-Teknology²: The Chip
- Released: October 17, 2006
- Billboard 200 chart position: #38
- R&B/Hip-Hop chart position: #8
- U.S. Sales: 51,782
- Singles: "Where It Started At (NY)"/"Can We Go Back"
Hi-Teknology 3
- Released: December 11, 2007
- Billboard 200 chart position: #48
- R&B/Hip-Hop chart position: #
- Singles: "My Piano"
Revolutions Per Minute (by Reflection Eternal with Talib Kweli)
- Released: May 18, 2010
- Billboard 200 chart position: #18
- R&B/Hip-Hop chart position: TBA
- Singles: "Back Again", "In This World", "Strangers (Paranoid)"

=== Production [excluding Reflection Eternal tracks) ===
- 1997 Mood – half of Doom; "Snakebacks (Karma Pt. 2)" (12")
- 1997 Royal Flush – "Shines" (Ghetto Millionaire)
- 1997 Tara Thomas – "When You're in Love {Remix}" (12")
- 1998 Black Star – 6 tracks from Black Star
- 1999 Lady Laistee – "Authentique", "For the Ladies" (Black Mama)
- 1999 Mary J. Blige – "Beautiful {Black Star Remix}" (12")
- 1999 Common [featuring Sadat X] – "1-9-9-9", Mos Def – "Next Universe" (Soundbombing II)
- 2000 Beanie Sigel – "Get That Dough"; Big L – "Still Here"; Cocoa Brovaz – "Get Up" (Lyricist Lounge 2)
- 2000 Phife Dawg – "Flawless", "Alphabet Soup", "D.R.U.G.S.", "Beats, Rhymes & Phife" (Ventilation: Da LP); – "Miscellaneous (Hi-Tek Luv Boat Mix)"
- 2000 Piakhan – "Spheres" (12")
- 2001 Grand Agent [featuring Planet Asia] – "It's Only Right {Rap Niggaz 2}" (By Design)
- 2001 Jonell – "Round & Round {Remix}" (How High (soundtrack))
- 2001 Shaunta – "Good Lovin'" (The Wash (soundtrack))
- 2001 Syleena Johnson [featuring Mos Def] – "Hit on Me {Remix}" (12")
- 2001 Tha Eastsidaz – "Cool", "Eastside Ridaz" (Duces 'n Trayz: The Old Fashioned Way)
- 2002 Blackalicious – "It's Going Down" (Blazing Arrow / Brown Sugar Soundtrack)
- 2002 Boot Camp Clik – "Ice Skate" (The Chosen Few)
- 2002 Cormega – "Take These Jewels" (The True Meaning)
- 2002 Hi-Tek [featuring Phakhan & Big D] – "No One Knows Her Name" (Brown Sugar (soundtrack))
- 2002 Raphael Saadiq – "Tek 1", "Tek 2" (Instant Vintage)
- 2002 Slum Village – "Slumber" (Trinity (Past, Present and Future))
- 2002 Snoop Dogg – "I Believe in You", "I Miss That Bitch" (Paid tha Cost to Be da Boss)
- 2002 [featuring Soopafly, RBX, Mr. Kane] – "Doh Doh", "Doin' It Bigg", "Light That Shit Up" (Doggy Style Allstars: Welcome to tha House, Vol. 1)
- 2002 Syleena Johnson – "The Voice/Intro", "Outro" (Chapter 2: The Voice)
- 2002 Truth Hurts [featuring Dr. Dre] – "Hollywood" (Truthfully Speaking)
- 2003 G-Unit – "G Unit", "Eye for an Eye" (Beg for Mercy)
- 2003 Jonell – "Don't Stop" (12")
- 2004 213 – "Twist Yo Body" (The Hard Way)
- 2004 D12 – "Just Like U" (D12 World)
- 2004 Lloyd Banks [featuring Snoop Dogg, 50 Cent] – "I Get High" (The Hunger for More)
- 2004 Snoop Dogg – "No Thang on Me" {R&G (Rhythm & Gangsta): The Masterpiece)
- 2004 Xzibit – "Scent of a Woman"; [featuring Busta Rhymes] – "Tough Guy" (Weapons of Mass Destruction)
- 2005 50 Cent – "Best Friend"; Young Buck – "Don't Need No Help" (Get Rich Or Die Tryin' soundtrack); 50 – "Get in My Car", "Ryder Music" (The Massacre)
- 2005 Bizarre [featuring Obie Trice] – "Doctor Doctor"; [featuring Eminem] – "Hip Hop"; – "I'm in Luv Witchu" (Hannicap Circus)
- 2005 The Game – "Runnin'" (The Documentary)
- 2006 The Game – "Ol English" (Doctor's Advocate)
- 2006 Ghostface Killah – "Josephine" (More Fish)
- 2006 Gym Class Heroes – "New Friend Request {Hi-Tek Remix}" (Snakes On A Plane: The Album)
- 2007 Cassidy [featuring Bone Thugs-N-Harmony & Eve] – "Cash Rulez"
- 2007 Little Brother [featuring Dion] – "Step it Up" (Getback)
- 2007 Styles P [featuring Ray J] – "Let's Go" (Super Gangster, Extraordinary Gentleman)
- 2007 Young Buck [featuring Snoop Dogg, Trick Daddy] – "I Ain't Fuckin' wit You" (Buck the World)
- 2008 The Game – "Letter to the King" (L.A.X)
- 2008 Termanology – "In the Streets" (Politics as Usual)
- 2009 Bishop Lamont – "Friends" (11")
- 2009 Kurious [featuring Dave Dar & Co Campbell] – "Brand New Day" (II)
- 2010 Slum Village – "The Set Up" (Villa Manifesto)
- 2011 Reks – "The Wonder Years"; [featuring Freeway], "U Know" (Rhythmatic Eternal King Supreme)
- 2013 Dizzee Rascal – "Good" (The Fifth)
- 2016 Anderson .Paak – "Come Down" (Malibu)
- 2016 Hodgy – "Glory" (Fireplace: TheNotTheOtherSide)
- 2016 J Dilla – "The Creep (The O)"; "Gangsta Boogie" (The Diary)
- 2016 Termanology [featuring Bun B, Bodega Bamz and Masspike Miles] – "Where's the Love?" (More Politics)
- 2017 M-Dot – "Days Are All the Same" (Ego and the Enemy)
- 2020 Busta Rhymes [featuring Rick Ross] – "Master Fard Muhammad" (Extinction Level Event 2: The Wrath of God)
- 2021 Russ [featuring The Game] – "Nothin' New" (Chomp 2)
- 2021 Snoop Dogg [featuring Dave East & Fabolous] – "Make Some Money" (Snoop Dogg Presents Algorithm)
- 2022 "Gun Smoke" – (BODR)
