= Black Reel Award for Outstanding Actor, Independent Film =

Annual US film award

This article lists the winners and nominees for the Black Reel Award for Outstanding Actor in an Independent Film. This award was first given in 2002, before being retired during the 2006 ceremony.

== Winners and nominees ==
Winners are listed first and highlighted in bold.

=== 2000s ===
Year	Actor	Film	Ref
2002	Combined Actor / Actress		
2002	**Rockmond Dunbar**	**Punks**	
2002	**Allen Payne**	**Blue Hill Avenue**	
2002	Eriq Ebouaney	Lumumba	
2002	Kenny Young	One Week	
2002	Kerry Washington	Lift	
2003
2003	**Eriq La Salle**	**Crazy as Hell**	
2003	Michael Beach	Crazy as Hell	
2003	Mos Def	Civil Brand	
2004	—N/a		
2005
2005	**Mos Def**	**The Woodsman**	
2005	Shemar Moore	Motives	
2005	Clifton Powell	Woman Thou Art Loosed	
