= 2004 Sundance Film Festival =

2004 film festival edition

- Festival poster
- Location: Park City
- Hosted by: Sundance Institute
- Festival date: January 15–25, 2004
- Website: http://history.sundance.org/events/39
- 2005 Sundance Film Festival 2003 Sundance Film Festival

The 2004 Sundance Film Festival was held in Utah from January 15, 2004 to January 25, 2004. It was the 20th edition of the Sundance Film Festival, a program of the Sundance Institute.

== Films ==
| Film name - English | Film name - Non-English | Directed By | Written By | Category | Awards |
|---|---|---|---|---|---|
| Azumi | | Ryuhei Kitamura | Mataichiro Yamamoto, Isao Kiriyama | Park City at Midnight | |
| Born into Brothels | | | | | Audience Award: Documentary |
| Brother to Brother | | Rodney Evans | Rodney Evans | | Special Jury Prize: Dramatic |
| The Butterfly Effect | | Eric Bress, J. Mackye Gruber | Eric Bress, J. Mackye Gruber | Premieres | |
| C.S.A.: The Confederate States of America | | Kevin Willmott | Kevin Willmott | American Spectrum | |
| Carandiru | | Héctor Babenco | Héctor Babenco, Fernando Bonassi, Victor Navas | World Cinema | |
| The Clearing | | Pieter Jan Brugge | Justin Haythe | | |
| Dandelion | | Mark Milgard | Mark Milgard, Robb Williamson, R. D. Murphy | American Spectrum | |
| Dear Frankie | | Shona Auerbach | | Premieres | |
| D.E.B.S. | | Angela Robinson | Angela Robinson | Premieres | |
| DiG! | | | | | Grand Jury Prize: Documentary |
| Dogville | | Lars von Trier | Lars von Trier | Special Screenings | |
| Down to the Bone | | Debra Granik | Debra Granik, Richard Lieske | Dramatic Competition | Directing Award: Dramatic, Special Jury Prize for Acting (Vera Farmiga) |
| Easy | | Jane Weinstock | | Dramatic Competition | |
| Evergreen | | Enid Zentelis | | Dramatic Competition | |
| The Five Obstructions | | Lars von Trier, Jørgen Leth | Lars von Trier, Jørgen Leth | Special Screenings | |
| Garden State | | Zach Braff | Zach Braff | Dramatic Competition | |
| Grand Theft Parsons | | David Caffrey | Jeremy Drysdale | Park City at Midnight | |
| High Tension | Haute tension | Alexandre Aja | Alexandre Aja, Grégory Levasseur | Park City at Midnight | |
| Home | | Omelga Mthiyane | | | |
| Home of Phobia | Freshman Orientation | Ryan Shiraki | Ryan Shiraki | Park City at Midnight | |
| Iron Jawed Angels | | Katja von Garnier | | | |
| Kounandi | | Apolline Traore | | | |
| The Machinist | | Brad Anderson | Scott Kosar | Premieres | |
| Maria Full of Grace | María, llena eres de gracia | Joshua Marston | Joshua Marston | Dramatic Competition | Audience Award: Dramatic |
| Marie and Bruce | | Tom Cairns | Wallace Shawn, Tom Cairns | Premieres | |
| Mean Creek | | Jacob Aaron Estes | Jacob Aaron Estes | American Spectrum | |
| The Meaning of the Buffalo | | Karin Slater | | | |
| Metallica: Some Kind of Monster | | | | | |
| The Motorcycle Diaries | | Walter Salles | José Rivera | | |
| Napoleon Dynamite | | Jared Hess | Jared and Jerusha Hess | Dramatic Competition | |
| November | | Greg Harrison | Greg Harrison | Dramatic Competition | |
| One Point O | Paranoia 1.0 | Jeff Renfroe, Marteinn Thorsson | Jeff Renfroe, Marteinn Thorsson | Dramatic Competition | |
| Open Water | | Chris Kentis | Chris Kentis | American Spectrum | |
| Overnight | | Tony Montana | Tony Montana, Mark Brian Smith | Park City at Midnight | |
| The Park | | Andrew Lau | | Park City at Midnight | |
| Primer | | Shane Carruth | Shane Carruth | Dramatic Competition | Grand Jury Prize: Dramatic, Alfred P. Sloan Prize |
| The Principles of Lust | | Penny Woolcock | | | |
| The Raspberry Reich | | Bruce LaBruce | Bruce LaBruce | Park City at Midnight | |
| Redemption | | Vondie Curtis-Hall | | | |
| The Return | Vozvrashcheniye | Andrey Zvyagintsev | Vladimir Moiseyenko, Aleksandr Novototsky | World Cinema | |
| This Revolution | | | | | |
| Riding Giants | | Stacy Peralta | | | |
| Saved! | | Brian Dannelly | Brian Dannelly, Michael Urban | Premieres | |
| Saw | | James Wan | Leigh Whannell | Park City at Midnight | |
| Seducing Doctor Lewis | | Jean-François Pouliot | Ken Scott | Audience Award | |
| Silent Waters | | Sabiha Sumar | | | |
| Speak | | Jessica Sharzer | | | |
| Spring, Summer, Fall, Winter... and Spring | | Kim Ki-duk | Kim Ki-duk | World Cinema | |
| Super Size Me | | Morgan Spurlock | Morgan Spurlock | Documentary Competition | |
| Tiptoes | | Matthew Bright | Bill Weiner | Premieres | |
| Until the Violence Stops | | Abby Epstein | | | |
| We Don't Live Here Anymore | | John Curran | Larry Gross | Dramatic Competition | Waldo Salt Screenwriting Award |
| The Woodsman | | Nicole Kassell | Nicole Kassell, Steven Fechter | Dramatic Competition | |

== Awards ==
The award show took place on January 24, and was presented by actors Zooey Deschanel and Jake Gyllenhaal.

- Dramatic Grand Jury Prize: Primer
- 2004 Alfred P. Sloan Prize: Primer

== See also ==
- List of Sundance Film Festival award winners
