= Creator (film) =

1985 film directed by Ivan Passer

- Theatrical release poster
- Directed by: Ivan Passer
- Screenplay by: Jeremy Leven
- Based on: Creator (novel) by Jeremy Leven
- Produced by: Stephen J. Friedman
- Starring: Peter O'Toole; Mariel Hemingway; Vincent Spano; Virginia Madsen; David Ogden Stiers
- Cinematography: Robbie Greenberg
- Edited by: Richard Chew
- Music by: Sylvester Levay
- Production company: Kings Road Entertainment
- Distributed by: Universal Pictures
- Release date: September 20, 1985
- Running time: 107 minutes
- Country: United States
- Language: English
- Budget: $12 million
- Box office: $5,349,607

Creator is a 1985 American comedy film directed by Ivan Passer, starring Peter O'Toole, Vincent Spano, Mariel Hemingway, and Virginia Madsen. It is based on the 1980 novel of the same title by Jeremy Leven, who also wrote the screenplay adaptation.

== Plot ==
Dr. Harry Wolper is an eccentric medical professor teaching at a small Southern California college who is obsessed with making a clone of his wife Lucy who died in childbirth 30 years earlier. Harry hires Boris Lafkin, a struggling pre-med student as his personal assistant to help him with his experiments by obtaining lab equipment and working in his backyard shed in exchange for which Harry gives Boris love life advice in courting an attractive student named Barbara who slowly becomes smitten with Boris. To continue his research into cloning, Harry meets and employs a young woman, named Meli, who practically moves in with him on an agreement to contribute her ovary sample as part of the cloning progress. Meli slowly falls for the much older Harry who begins to question his ethics and vision of true love. Meanwhile, a rival of Harry's, fellow medical professor Dr. Sid Kuhlenbeck, tries to investigate and hinder Harry's cloning plans as part of a ploy to remove Harry from the university to take over Harry's lab for himself. Dr. Kuhlenbeck's plan is to have Harry reassigned to Northfield, an outlying branch of the university where no actual research is conducted, and which apparently serves as little more than a place to send older scientists. Kuhlenbeck's plan backfires after Harry successfully earns a sizable research grant. Because grants are given to individuals, and not institutions, the grant money follows Harry to Northfield, much to Kuhlenbeck's chagrin.

Barbara suffers an aneurysm and is hospitalised by Sid. Her parents welcome Boris into their hearts, but are advised to turn off her life support despite his protestations. Harry gains some time for Boris to talk to Barbara in her coma, and eventually she wakes up. Harry pours his dead wife’s cells into the sea and marries Meli. Everyone chooses to follow him to Northfield.

== Cast ==
- Peter O'Toole as Dr. Harry Wolper
- Mariel Hemingway as Meli
- Vincent Spano as Boris Lafkin
- Virginia Madsen as Barbara Spencer
- David Ogden Stiers as Dr. Sid Kullenbeck
- John Dehner as Paul
- Karen Kopins as Lucy
- Kenneth Tigar as Pavlo
- Elsa Raven as Mrs. Mallory
- Rance Howard as Mr. Spencer
- Ellen Geer as Mrs. Spencer
- Ian Wolfe as Prof. Brauer
- Byrne Piven as Krauss
- Jordan Charney as Dr. Whitaker
- William H. Bassett as Dr. Sutter
- Jeff Corey as Dean Harrington
- Michael McGrady as Larry
- Eve McVeagh as Woman with monkey (final screen appearance)

== Production ==
Producer Andrew Braunsberg first acquired the rights to Creator by Jeremy Leven for Lorimar Productions in March 1980 for $500,000 with Jonathan Demme attached to direct. Leven wrote multiple drafts of the script but ultimately none were greenlit and the rights reverted back to him. In 1982, Leven sold the rights to his novel Satan, His Psychotherapy and Cure by the Unfortunate Dr. Kassler, J.S.P.S. to Kings Road Entertainment and director Ivan Passer asked to see Creator, which led to Kings Road purchasing the rights. Leven was heavily involved with the production and had input on casting, costuming, location scouting, and even assisted in re-editing the film’s trailer.

== Reception ==
In a review for the Chicago Sun-Times, Roger Ebert gave the film two and a half stars out of four and wrote, "Creator is ambitious and tries to do a lot of things and does most of them well, but it's a close miss".

On the review aggregator website Rotten Tomatoes, 38% of 13 critics' reviews are positive.
