= Nicole Kassell =

American film director

- Born: 1972 (age 53–54); Philadelphia, Pennsylvania, United States
- Education: Columbia University (BA); New York University (MFA)
- Occupation: Filmmaker
- Relatives: Lauren Kassell

Nicole Kassell (born 1972) is an American filmmaker. She made her film debut with the drama film The Woodsman (2004), for which she was nominated for the Grand Jury Prize at the 2004 Sundance Film Festival. Kassell has also worked on television shows such as Vinyl, The Leftovers and Watchmen.

For her work on Watchmen, Kassell received numerous accolades, including a Directors Guild of America Award for Outstanding Directorial Achievement in Dramatic Series for the episode "It's Summer and We're Running Out of Ice" and, as an executive producer, a Primetime Emmy Award for Outstanding Limited or Anthology Series, including a nomination for the Primetime Emmy Award for Outstanding Directing for a Limited or Anthology Series or Movie.

== Early life ==
Kassell was born in Philadelphia, Pennsylvania, and raised in Charlottesville, VA where she attended St. Anne's-Belfield School. Her father, Dr. Neal Kassell, a University of Virginia medical professor, performed two brain surgeries on Joe Biden in 1988 to repair his aneurysm and the two have remained friends ever since.

She earned a BA in Art history from Columbia University, and received her MFA from the Tisch School of the Arts at NYU. While a student at NYU, she made three short films, including The Green Hour, which was screened at the Sundance Film Festival in 2002. While attending NYU she received full scholarship for two years.

== Career ==
=== Film ===
A year earlier, she had won the Slamdance Screenplay Competition for her first feature-length project, The Woodsman (2004 film), adapted from Steven Fechter's 1997 minimalist play she had seen staged at The Actors Studio in New York City. Her enthusiasm for it convinced Lee Daniels, one of the producers of Monster's Ball, to help her get funding for the film version. When he approached Kevin Bacon, the actor was so impressed by the script, about a convicted child molester forced to deal with social prejudice and the fear he will not be able to control his dark urges after he is released from prison, that he suggested he star in the movie opposite wife Kyra Sedgwick. The Woodsman competed at Sundance and the Toronto International Film Festival, was featured in the Director’s Fortnight at the Cannes Film Festival, and eventually was released to the public in 2004. Kassell's second feature film, A Little Bit of Heaven, a romantic comedy starring Kate Hudson and Gael García Bernal, had its first release in February 2011 in the UK.

She has adapted Arthur Miller's play The Ride Down Mt. Morgan for the big screen. The project has been in pre-production since 2004 and will reportedly feature a cast that includes Diane Keaton, Emily Blunt and Michael Douglas if it goes into production. Douglas would also serve as executive producer.

In February 2021, Kassell was chosen to direct a new adaptation of The Wonderful Wizard of Oz at New Line Cinema.

=== Television ===
Kassell has directed episodes of the series Cold Case and 3 lbs (both on CBS), The Closer (on TNT), The Killing (on AMC), Vinyl (on HBO) and The Americans (on FX). She also is writing an adaptation of the book Bad Medicine for HBO.

In 2018, it was announced that Kassell would direct the pilot for the HBO series Watchmen. In January 2020, Kassell won the Directors Guild of America Award for Dramatic Series for directing the Watchmen episode "It's Summer and We're Running Out of Ice".

Kassell signed with WME in 2018.

== Personal life ==
Kassell is now living in New York City, with her husband and two children. In an interview for a Complex article, Kassell described part of her ethnic identity and how it informed her work on the Watchmen series: "My father is Jewish and I am half-Jewish. We all lived in Charlottesville, and I’m just realizing in talking with you, that my ancestors escaped the pogroms of Ukraine. How much is there actually in my DNA history that I’m not even aware of that I am pouring into this?"

== Filmography ==
Short film

Year	Title	Director	Producer	Writer	Editor
1999	Jamie	Yes	No	No	No
1999	Spent Nation	No	Yes	No	Yes
2001	Slo-Mo	No	Yes	No	No
2002	The Green Hour	Yes	Yes	Yes	No

Feature film

- The Woodsman (2004) (Also writer)
- A Little Bit of Heaven (2011)
- The 99'ers (2027)

Television

Year	Title	Director	Executive Producer	Episode(s)	Ref.
2006	3 lbs	Yes	No	"Disarming"	
2006–2008	Cold Case	Yes	No	"One Night" "Sabotage"	
2009–2010	The Closer	Yes	No	"Elysian Fields" "High Crimes"	
2011–2014	The Killing	Yes	No	"Missing" "Keylela" "72 Hours" "Six Minutes" "Blood in the Water"	
2013	Suits	Yes	No	"Zane vs. Zane"	
2013-2015	The Following	Yes	No	"Havenport" "Reflection" "Unmasked" "Home" "The Edge"	
2013-2015	Rectify	Yes	No	"Modern Times" "The Future"	
2013–2017	The Americans	Yes	No	"Covert War" "Dinner for Seven" "The World Council of Churches"	
2015	Better Call Saul	Yes	No	"Alpine Shepherd Boy"	
2015–2016	American Crime	Yes	No	"Episode Six" "Season Two: Episode Ten"	
2015–2017	The Leftovers	Yes	No	"No Room at the Inn" "It's a Matt, Matt, Matt, Matt World"	
2016	Vinyl	Yes	No	"Cyclone"	
2017	Claws	Yes	No	"Tirana" "Teatro"	
2018	Westworld	Yes	No	"Les Écorchés"	
2018	Castle Rock	Yes	No	"Romans"	
2019	Watchmen	Yes	Yes	"It's Summer and We're Running Out of Ice" "Martial Feats of Comanche Horsemanship" "A God Walks into Abar"	
2021	The Baby	Yes	Yes	"The Arrival"	
2025	Sirens	Yes	Yes	"Exile" "Talons"	

== Awards and nominations ==
Year	Award	Category	Title	Result	Ref.
2020	Primetime Emmy Awards	Outstanding Limited or Anthology Series	Watchmen	Won	
2020	Primetime Emmy Awards	Outstanding Directing for a Limited or Anthology Series or Movie	Watchmen	Nominated	
2020	Directors Guild of America Award	Outstanding Directorial Achievement in Dramatic Series	Watchmen	Won	
2002	Humanitas Prize		The Woodsman	Won	
2002	London Film Festival	The Satyajit Ray Award	The Woodsman	Nominated	
2002	Deauville Film Festival	The Jury Prize	The Woodsman	Won	
2002	The Cannes Film Festival	CACAE (art house award) at the Directors' Fortnight	The Woodsman	Won	
2002	Slamdance Screenplay Competition		The Woodsman	Won	
1999	DGA	Student Female Filmmaker Prize	Jaime	Won	
