= The Woodsman (film) =

2004 film by Nicole Kassell

- Theatrical release poster
- Directed by: Nicole Kassell
- Screenplay by: Nicole Kassell; Steven Fechter
- Based on: The Woodsman by Steven Fechter
- Produced by: Lee Daniels
- Starring: Kevin Bacon; Kyra Sedgwick; Eve; Mos Def; David Alan Grier; Benjamin Bratt
- Cinematography: Xavier Pérez Grobet
- Edited by: Brian A. Kates; Lisa Fruchtman
- Music by: Nathan Larson
- Production companies: Dash Films; Lee Daniels Entertainment
- Distributed by: Newmarket Films
- Release dates: January 19, 2004 (Sundance); October 10, 2004 (Chicago); December 24, 2004 (United States)
- Running time: 87 minutes
- Country: United States
- Language: English
- Box office: $4.7 million

The Woodsman is a 2004 American drama film directed by Nicole Kassell in her feature directorial debut, from a screenplay by Kassell and Steven Fechter, and based on the play of the same name by Fechter. Starring Kevin Bacon and Kyra Sedgwick, the film follows a convicted child molester who must adjust to life after being released from prison. The title of the film refers to the woodsman from the fairy tale Little Red Riding Hood, who kills the wolf to save the titular child.

The Woodsman premiered at the Sundance Film Festival on January 19, 2004, where it was nominated for the Grand Jury Prize, and was screened at the Chicago International Film Festival on October 10, 2004, where it was nominated for the Gold Hugo. The film was theatrically released in the United States on December 24, 2004, to widespread acclaim, with Bacon's performance earning critical praise. It received three nominations at the 20th Independent Spirit Awards, Best First Feature for Kassell, Best Male Lead for Bacon, and Best Debut Performance for Hannah Pilkes. At the 9th Golden Satellite Awards, Bacon was nominated for Best Actor – Drama and Sedgwick was nominated for Best Supporting Actress – Drama.

== Plot ==
Walter, a convicted child molester, returns home to Philadelphia after serving 12 years in prison. His friends and family have abandoned him, with the exception of his brother-in-law, Carlos. Walter's apartment is just across the street from an elementary school—an obvious source of temptation. He gets a job at a local lumber mill and meets Vicki, one of the few women working there. After sleeping with Vicki, Walter tells her that he molested little girls, but rationalizes his crimes by saying "I didn't hurt them." Vicki is clearly shocked and disturbed by this new information, but before she can consider how to respond, Walter tells her to leave his apartment.

Walter receives frequent visits from a verbally abusive police officer named Lucas, who makes it clear that he is waiting to catch Walter reoffending. Watching the school, Walter sees a man offering candy to little boys. He realizes that this man, whom he nicknames "Candy", is another child molester. Walter also meets an apparently lonely young girl named Robin who is a birdwatcher. Walter sees Candy abduct a boy, but does not report this to the police. Walter's life takes a further downturn when a suspicious coworker, Mary-Kay, learns of his conviction. She prints out his police record and posts it on the bulletin board at the mill for everybody to see. Some of the employees attack Walter, but Vicki and the boss of the mill come to his defense.

Ostracized and frustrated, Walter leaves his workplace and goes to the park. Vicki, fearing the worst, begins to search for him. Walter ends up meeting with Robin at the park. As they talk, he begins to succumb to his desires and invites Robin to sit on his lap. She politely refuses, but then begins to confide in him. As she starts to cry, Walter realizes that she is being molested by her father. In her anguish, and sensing a similarity between her father and Walter, she offers to sit on Walter's lap, wanting his approval. Walter finally understands the pain he caused his victims, and tells Robin to go home; as she leaves, she gives him a hug. On his way home, he sees Candy dropping off a young boy near the school at night. In a fit of rage and self-hatred, Walter beats Candy up. He then goes to Vicki's home, and she accepts him.

Soon after, Lucas visits Walter's apartment as Walter is packing to move in with Vicki and tells him that a man was beaten across the street the night before, and asks if he knows anything about it. Walter denies any knowledge, but Lucas knows better. He reveals that the boy gave a very good description of the assailant, which fits Walter. He also reveals that "Candy" is wanted in Virginia for raping a young boy. Lucas then leaves, showing that he has chosen to look past the incident.

With Carlos' help, Walter is reunited with his sister, whom he has not seen in years. However, she refuses to forgive him and leaves. In a voice-over discussion in which his therapist tells him that eventual forgiveness may take years, Walter replies that he understands and accepts her anger, and expresses optimism for his own future.

== Cast ==
- Kevin Bacon as Walter
- Kyra Sedgwick as Vicki
- Mos Def as Sergeant Lucas
- Benjamin Bratt as Carlos
- Eve as Mary-Kay
- David Alan Grier as Bob
- Hannah Pilkes as Robin
- Kevin Rice as "Candy"
- Michael Shannon as Rosen
- Jessica Nagle as Annette

== Production ==
After seeing Steven Fechter's stage play The Woodsman as a film school student, Nicole Kassell became determined to adapt it into a film. Kassell and Fechter adapted the screenplay together, making it a "less talky, more internalized character study of a haunted man struggling to build a normal life." Lee Daniels, who was a producer on the Oscar-winning film Monster's Ball, came on board as a producer. Kevin Bacon, besides starring in the film, was one of the producers as well. For research, Kassell interviewed sex offenders and therapists who worked with them.

The Woodsman was shot in Philadelphia, which is the hometown of cast members Bacon and Eve, as well as the birthplace of director Kassell and producer Daniels.

== Release ==
=== Box office ===
The film's release in the United States was limited, reaching a peak of 84 theaters. Despite being advertised in cinemas in the UK for several months, the film had a very limited release in the UK due to its controversial subject matter. Its gross in the United States was $1,576,231, while its worldwide gross totaled $4,678,405.

=== Critical reception ===
The film was well-received critically, with Bacon's performance in particular drawing praise. Rotten Tomatoes reported that 88% of critics gave the film a positive review based on 133 reviews with an average rating of 7.30/10 with the consensus "Kevin Bacon's performance as a child molester who is trying to start fresh has drawn raves from critics, who have praised The Woodsman as compelling, creepy, complex and well-crafted." The film has a score of 72 on Metacritic based on 34 reviews. It was nominated for the Grand Jury Prize award at the 2004 Sundance Film Festival, won the Jury Special Prize at the Deauville Film Festival, and was a featured film at the 2005 Traverse City Film Festival.

In an interview with The New York Times in 2010, actor Colin Firth named Bacon's performance the Best of the Decade.

=== Awards and nominations ===
Award	Category	Nominee(s)	Result	Ref.
Black Reel Awards	Best Actor, Independent Film	Yasiin Bey	Won	
Black Reel Awards	Best Actress, Independent Film	Eve	Nominated	
Black Reel Awards	Best Independent Film	Lee Daniels, Marvet Britto	Won	
Boston Society of Film Critics Awards	Best New Filmmaker	Nicole Kassell	Nominated	
British Independent Film Awards	Best Foreign Independent Film		Nominated	
Cannes Film Festival	C.I.C.A.E. Award	Nicole Kassell	Nominated	
Cannes Film Festival	Golden Camera	Nicole Kassell	Nominated	
Deauville Film Festival	Jury Special Prize	Nicole Kassell	Won	
Deauville Film Festival	Grand Special Prize	Nicole Kassell	Nominated	
Independent Spirit Awards	Best First Feature	Nicole Kassell, Lee Daniels	Nominated	
Independent Spirit Awards	Best Male Lead	Kevin Bacon	Nominated	
Independent Spirit Awards	Best Debut Performance	Hannah Pilkes	Nominated	
Ghent International Film Festival	Special Mention	Kevin Bacon	Won	
Ghent International Film Festival	Grand Prix	Nicole Kassell	Nominated	
Gotham Independent Film Awards	Breakthrough Director	Nicole Kassell	Nominated	
Gotham Independent Film Awards	Breakthrough Actor	Yasiin Bey	Nominated	
Humanitas Prize	Sundance Film Category	Nicole Kassell, Steven Fechter	Nominated	
London Film Festival	Satyajit Ray Award	Nicole Kassell	Won	
National Board of Review Awards	Special Recognition for excellence in filmmaking		Won	
Satellite Awards	Best Actor in a Motion Picture, Drama	Kevin Bacon	Nominated	
Satellite Awards	Best Actress in a Supporting Role, Drama	Kyra Sedgwick	Nominated	
Sundance Film Festival	Grand Jury Prize - Dramatic Feature	Nicole Kassell	Nominated	
Women Film Critics Circle Awards	Special Mention Award for up and coming filmmaking	Nicole Kassell	Won	
Young Artist Awards	Best Performance in a Feature Film - Supporting Young Actress	Hannah Pilkes	Nominated	

== Home media ==
The film was released on VHS and DVD on April 12, 2005 by Columbia TriStar Home Entertainment.
