= Jeremy Leven =

American screenwriter, director, producer, and novelist (born 1941)

- Born: August 16, 1941 (age 85); South Bend, Indiana, U.S.
- Education: St. John's College (Annapolis/Santa Fe); Harvard University; University of Connecticut; Yale School of Medicine
- Occupations: Screenwriter, director, producer, and novelist
- Spouse: Roberta Danza (deceased)

Jeremy Leven (born August 16, 1941) is an American screenwriter, director, producer, and novelist.

== Early life and education ==
Born in South Bend, Indiana, Leven was educated at St. John's College in Annapolis, Maryland, Harvard University, the University of Connecticut and Yale University Medical School.

== Career ==
While at Harvard, he founded a satirical revue called The Proposition that ran for ten years in Cambridge, Massachusetts, and off-Broadway.

Leven's first novel, Creator, was published in 1980 and released as a film of the same title in 1985. Leven was a practicing neuropsychiatrist, a theme incorporated in his second novel, Satan: His Psychotherapy and Cure by the Unfortunate Dr. Kassler, J.S.P.S., which was published in 1982 and filmed as Crazy as Hell in 2002. His third and most recent novel, The Savior and the Singing Machine, was published in January 2019.

Leven wrote and directed Don Juan DeMarco (1994), wrote and produced Alex & Emma (2003), wrote the screenplays for The Legend of Bagger Vance (2000), The Notebook (2004), My Sister's Keeper (2009), and Real Steel (2011), and did uncredited writing on The Time Traveler's Wife (2009). Recently, Leven wrote and directed Girl on a Bicycle (2013).

=== Awards ===
- 1999 – Connie Award" Outstanding Achievement in Film, Connecticut Film Commission
- 2003 – "Meilleur Sceneriste" (Best Screenwriter) – European Award conferred by Prince Albert of Monaco
- 2006 – "Special Award for Outstanding Achievement", SunDeis Film Festival, Brandeis University
- 2014 – "Lifetime Achievement – Excellence in Screenwriting", Sedona International Film Festival

== Personal life ==
Leven lives in Woodbridge, Connecticut; Paris; and New York City.
