= Dec 99th =

American hip-hop group

- Genres: Alternative hip-hop; jazz rap; soul
- Years active: 2013–present
- Members: Mos Def; Ferrari Sheppard

Dec. 99th is an alternative hip-hop group consisting of Mos Def and Ferrari Sheppard. The duo also collaborates on visual art and fashion projects.

== History ==
In 2013, Mos Def and Sheppard met in Addis Ababa, Ethiopia and began collaborating on visual art and web projects. Sheppard, a photographer and journalist at the time, quietly began making music to relax. The two soon began releasing music as Dec. 99th.

On August 1, 2016, Dec 99th released their fourth song on Tidal titled "Hymn", following the previously released "N.A.W", which was followed up by "Tall Sleeves" and later "Local Time". The track was accompanied by a statement from the pair, "Condolences to the families of the slain. Never stop pursuing freedom," likely a reference to police killings in the United States.

The group released their fifth track, "Seaside Panic Room" two days after releasing "Hymn", causing many music writers to anticipate a full-length December 99th album.

The album was released December 21, 2016 after being delayed from the original release date of December 9. It was exclusively released to Tidal. The reception of the album was generally negative, being described as ‘by far the worst thing he’s ever released’ by Pitchfork.

The album was removed from Tidal sometime between November 8th 2020 and August 29 2021 without any official statement. There is no legal way to purchase or listen to the album as of right now, as it never got released to other streaming services.

== Discography ==
Studio albums

- December 99th (2016)
