= Keylela =

- The Killing episode
- Episode no.: Season 2 Episode 7
- Directed by: Nicole Kassell
- Written by: Dan Nowak
- Production code: BDH207/S207
- Original air date: May 6, 2012

Guest appearances
- Patti Kim as Roberta Drays; Randal Edwards as Ray; Allison Hossack as Sally Ames; Kacey Rohl as Sterling Fitch; William Belleau as Myron; Claudia Ferri as Nicole Jackson; Tantoo Cardinal as Prostitute; Justin Rain as Benny; Q'orianka Kilchner as Mary

Episode chronology
← Previous "Openings"	Next → "Off the Reservation"
- The Killing (season 2)

"Keylela" is the twentieth episode of the American television drama series The Killing, and the seventh of its second season, which aired on May 6, 2012. The episode is written by Dan Nowak and directed by Nicole Kassell. In the episode, the detectives focus their investigation on the casino. Darren Richmond's renewed campaign holds a press conference with Stan Larsen as a surprise supporter.

== Plot ==
At Stephen Holder's apartment, Sarah Linden (Mireille Enos) suggests that whoever put the drawing on her motel refrigerator knows about her. Holder (Joel Kinnaman) insists his place is safe. Outside, casino security guard Roberta Drays (Patti Kim) watches the apartment from her car.

The next morning, Holder cooks breakfast. Linden looks at a book of Holder's about monarch butterflies and finds a butterfly migration observation site within the Wapi Indian reservation. Police technician Ray (Randal Edwards) calls her to report that the sound heard in Rosie's voicemail is likely the cooling fan of a diesel generator used by construction companies. She asks Holder to seek out any business records between Michael Ames' construction company and the Wapi casino.

At the hospital, Gwen Eaton (Kristin Lehman) suggests getting Stan Larsen to make a statement on Richmond's (Billy Campbell) behalf, which could change voters' perception. She adds that, as an incentive she can negotiate a reduced sentence with the prosecutor in Stan's assault case, who is a friend. In private, however, she tells Jamie Wright (Eric Ladin) that the prosecutor does not negotiate and their plan is a bluff.

Stan (Brent Sexton) is visited by Rosie's friend Sterling (Kacey Rohl), who gives him the contents of Rosie's locker. She thinks the school has been influenced by media coverage and has cleaned out Rosie's locker in an attempt to wash their hands of the situation.

Linden drops Jack (Liam James) at a new motel and rushes out again after receiving a call from Holder. In her car, Holder says Ames' construction company is involved in a $50 million renovation project at the casino. She asks him to surveil the casino while she explores Point Yubec, where she believes Rosie filmed the butterfly migration. She also mentions that Chief Nicole Jackson has been publicly accused of pocketing the casino's profits and wonders if Rosie had felt trapped.

Linden arrives at Point Yubec and follows a trail, ignoring a posted warning sign. At the casino, Holder tells blackjack dealer Myron (William Belleau) that he is looking for a good time. The dealer hands him a chip, telling him the bartender will help him out. Linden enters a burial ground and is stopped by Jackson (Claudia Ferri). As two more people approach, Linden reminds Jackson that Linden is a cop. Jackson reminds Linden she has no jurisdiction on the reservation and threatens Linden with a warning.

At the Larsen house, Gwen and Jamie ask Stan to endorse Richmond in exchange for a lighter sentence in his assault case. Stan refuses when Gwen hesitates at putting the deal in writing. Back at the hospital, Gwen admits to trying to deceive Stan. They decide to instead focus the press conference around Richmond's recovery. In Stan's garage, Richmond assures Stan he had no role in Rosie's murder and Stan does not need to do anything for him. Stan is upset that no one cares about Rosie as a person anymore. Richmond tells him to make them care.

At a bar, Holder asks a prostitute (Tantoo Cardinal) to take him to the construction site. After she refuses, male prostitute Benny (Justin Rain) offers to take him. Holder leaves him after being told the site is on the tenth floor. Holder pushes the elevator button for the tenth floor, but it doesn't work. He rides to the ninth floor and walks up the final flight of stairs, only to find a locked stairwell door. Back on the elevator, Holder encounters casino maid Mary (Q'orianka Kilcher), who hands him a book of matches. After stepping off, she mentions Rosie's backpack, and the doors close before Holder can pursue her. He opens the matches to see a simple note: "11am tomorrow". The elevator arrives at the lobby, where Holder is greeted by tribal policemen. One of them handcuffs Holder, who says he is a cop. The tribesman replies, “Not here, you ain't.”

Linden leaves Holder a voicemail to warn him that Jackson's men chased her off the reservation and he should get out of there. She arrives at her motel and calls Ray to request information about the burial grounds at Point Yubec. Walking to her room, she finds Jack talking to officers from Child Protective Services.

At the Larsen house, Denny (Seth Isaac Johnson) mentions that the police talked to Terry at school. When asked about it, Terry (Jamie Anne Allman) tells Stan that they asked about Michael Ames, the boyfriend who had kicked her out and whom she met through Beau Soleil; he is Jasper's father. She admits that Rosie was also on the website. Stan, infuriated, screams at her to leave.

Back in the motel room, the officers question Linden. Jack tells Linden he needs to go to the bathroom, from which he climbs out the window. Linden pretends to take a call, leaves the room, and meets Jack at the car. They drive off, she apologizes to him, and he acts coldly toward her. She leaves another message for Holder, warning him that something is going on.

Gwen arrives at the press conference with Stan, who has agreed to make a statement. Stan complains to the media about their using Rosie's death to sell newspapers. He then offers a $12,000 bounty for information leading to her killer and leaves, having said nothing about Richmond's innocence.

Jackson's men drive Holder past tribal police headquarters. He notices this, mentions it, but gets no response. He is taken to a remote clearing in the woods, where Jackson is waiting along with Roberta and others. Jackson tells him that he and Linden have gone where they were not supposed to. Linden has already been given the "warning". As Roberta and the others brutally beat Holder, Jackson smiles and calls Linden on his phone, holding it out so Linden can listen to the assault.

== Reception ==
=== Critical reception ===
"Keylela" received mixed reviews. Sean McKenna of TV Fanatic rated the episode 4.5 out of 5 stars, stating "'Keylela' struck with such a dramatic force that it reinvigorated what made the series compelling in the first place. Suspense soaked the hour and believable emotions rang high. This was an episode that made me care and pushed along fantastic scenes where I wanted to see what would happen next." The A.V. Club's Brandon Nowalk rated this episode a C, saying "If it didn't feel like the scent had been lost for no good reason, 'Keylela' would actually be one of the more interesting episodes of the season precisely because it's so atmospheric... Nothing happens, but a lot of that nothing is creepy and evocative...what does happen in the subplots is barely sketched." William Bibbiani of CraveOnline liked the "fun, fast-moving" episode, adding: "'Openings' was a fairly involving episode of The Killing which moved the investigation and campaign forward (hurry for the latter, in particular), and touched upon some disturbing new themes that up the darkness quotient by at least half. We're entering into the final stretch, though, so the time has come to start following through." Paste Magazine's Adam Vitcavage gave the episode a 7.0 rating, commenting: "'Keylela' could have been, and should have been, an important episode. Yet, somehow it slipped through the cracks, and it was turned into an extended version of that moment in a film that just ticks you off no matter what happens next. It's that moment where you just ask yourself, 'Why is this happening?' For lack of a better word, it felt stupid."

=== Ratings ===
The episode was seen by 1.34 million viewers and obtained an adult 18-49 rating of 0.3, slightly lower than the previous episode.
