= Yasiin Bey =

American rapper (born 1973)

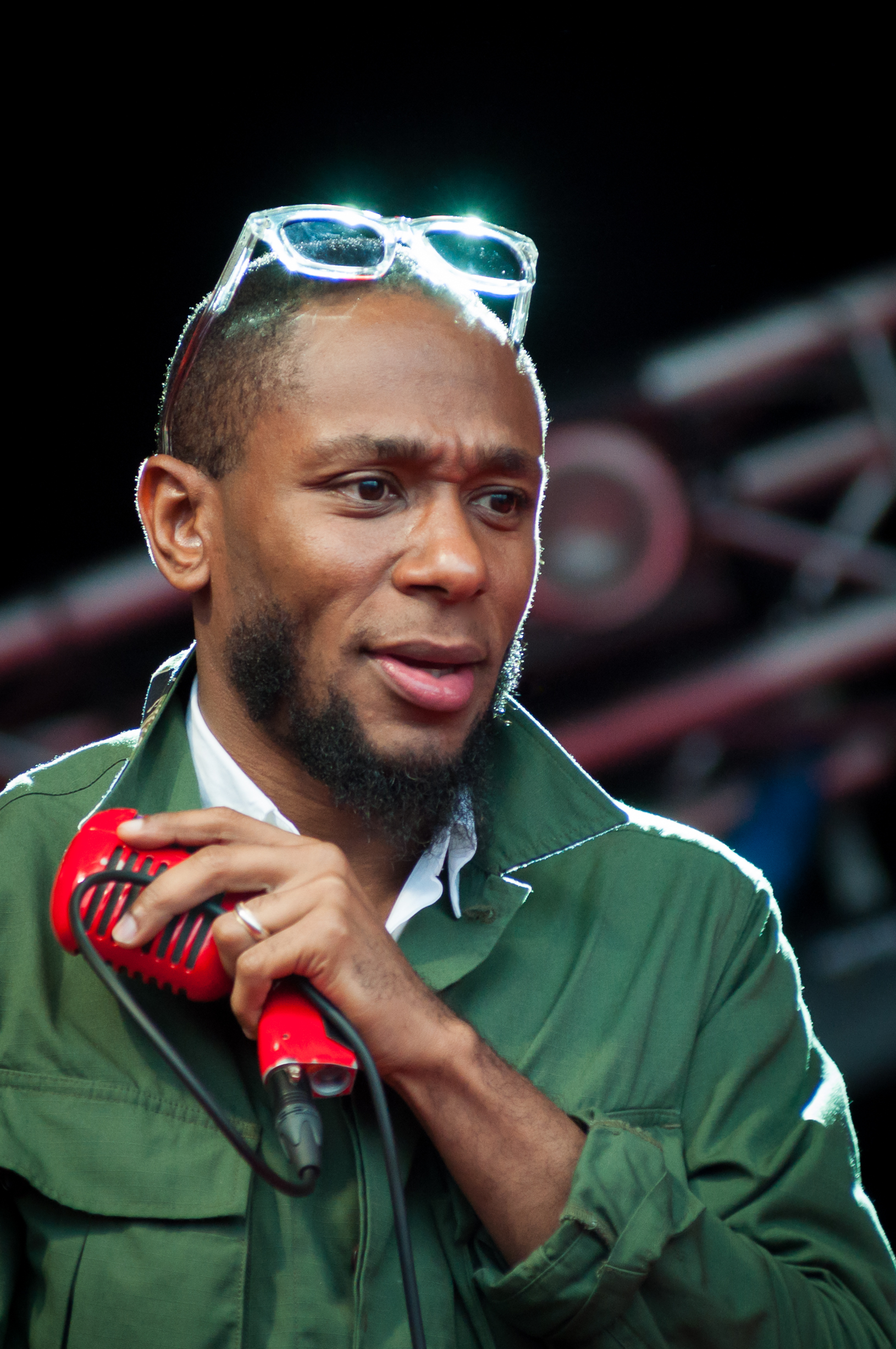
- Yasiin Bey performing at the 2012 Ilosaarirock festival

Background information
- Also known as: Mos Def (1994–2011); Black Dante; Dante Beze; Flaco; El-Bey the Moor
- Born: Dante Terrell Smith; December 11, 1973 (age 52); Brooklyn, New York City, U.S.
- Genres: East Coast hip-hop; alternative hip-hop; conscious hip-hop; progressive rap
- Occupations: Rapper; singer; songwriter; record producer; actor; activist
- Works: Discography; songs
- Years active: 1987–present
- Labels: Downtown; GOOD; Geffen; Rawkus; Priority
- Member of: Black Star
- Formerly of: Crooklyn Dodgers; Dec 99th; Soulquarians; UTD
- Children: 6, including Laila

Yasiin Bey (/jæˈsiːn ˈbeɪ/ yass-EEN BAY; born Dante Terrell Smith, December 11, 1973), formerly known as Mos Def (/ˌmoʊs ˈdɛf/ MOHSS DEF), is an American rapper, singer, and actor. A prominent figure in conscious hip-hop, he is recognized for his use of wordplay and commentary on social and political issues, such as police brutality, American exceptionalism, and the status of African Americans in the United States.

After embarking on his career in 1994, he joined his siblings in the short-lived rap group Urban Thermo Dynamics (UTD) and guest appeared on albums by Da Bush Babees and De La Soul. In 1996, he and fellow Brooklyn-based rapper Talib Kweli formed the duo Black Star, whose debut album Mos Def & Talib Kweli Are Black Star (1998) spawned the singles "Definition" and "Respiration" (featuring Common). His debut solo album, Black on Both Sides (1999), was met with critical acclaim, along with his fourth album, The Ecstatic (2009). Bey's 2000 single, "Oh No" (with Pharoahe Monch featuring Nate Dogg) remains his sole entry on the Billboard Hot 100 as a solo act. In 2014, About.com listed him 14th on its "50 Greatest Rappers of All Time".

A former child actor in television films, sitcoms, and theater, Bey has appeared in the films Something the Lord Made, Next Day Air, The Hitchhiker's Guide to the Galaxy, 16 Blocks, Be Kind Rewind, The Italian Job, The Woodsman, Bamboozled, and Brown Sugar and in television series such as Dexter and House. He hosted Def Poetry Jam from 2002 to 2007.

== Early life ==
Yasiin Bey was born on December 11, 1973, in Brooklyn, New York City, the son of Sheron Smith and Abdulrahman Smith. The eldest of 12 children and step-children, he was raised by his mother in Brooklyn, while his father lived in New Jersey.

His father was initially a member of the Nation of Islam and later followed Imam Warith Deen Mohammed, who merged into the mainstream Sunni Islam from the Nation of Islam. Bey was not exposed to Islam until the age of 13. He is close friends with fellow Muslim hip-hop artists Ali Shaheed Muhammad and Q-Tip.

Bey attended middle school at Philippa Schuyler Middle School in Bushwick, Brooklyn, where he developed his love for acting. While in high school at the then Julia Richman Talent Unlimited (TU) program he made his acting debut in the film, God Bless the Child starring Mare Winningham in 1988. From there he appeared in two television sitcoms, You Take the Kids and Here and Now. After returning from filming You Take the Kids in Los Angeles, and getting into a relationship with an older girl, Bey dropped out of high school during sophomore year. Growing up in New York City, during the crack epidemic of the 1980s and early 1990s, he has spoken about witnessing widespread instances of gang violence, theft, and poverty, which he largely avoided by working on plays, Off-Off-Broadway and arts programs. In a particularly traumatic childhood experience, Bey witnessed his then five-year-old younger brother, Ilias Bey (born Denard Smith), being hit by a car. Ilias later adopted the alias DCQ and was described by Bey as "my first partner in hip-hop".

== Music career ==
=== 1994–1998: Beginnings with Rawkus and Black Star ===
Bey began his music career in 1994, forming the group UTD (or Urban Thermo Dynamics) along with younger brother DCQ and high-school friend Ces. In 2004, they released the album Manifest Destiny, their first and only release to date. The album features a compilation of previously unreleased and re-released tracks recorded during the original UTD run.

In 1996, Bey emerged as a solo artist and worked with De La Soul and Da Bush Babees. In 1997, he released his first solo single "Universal Magnetic".

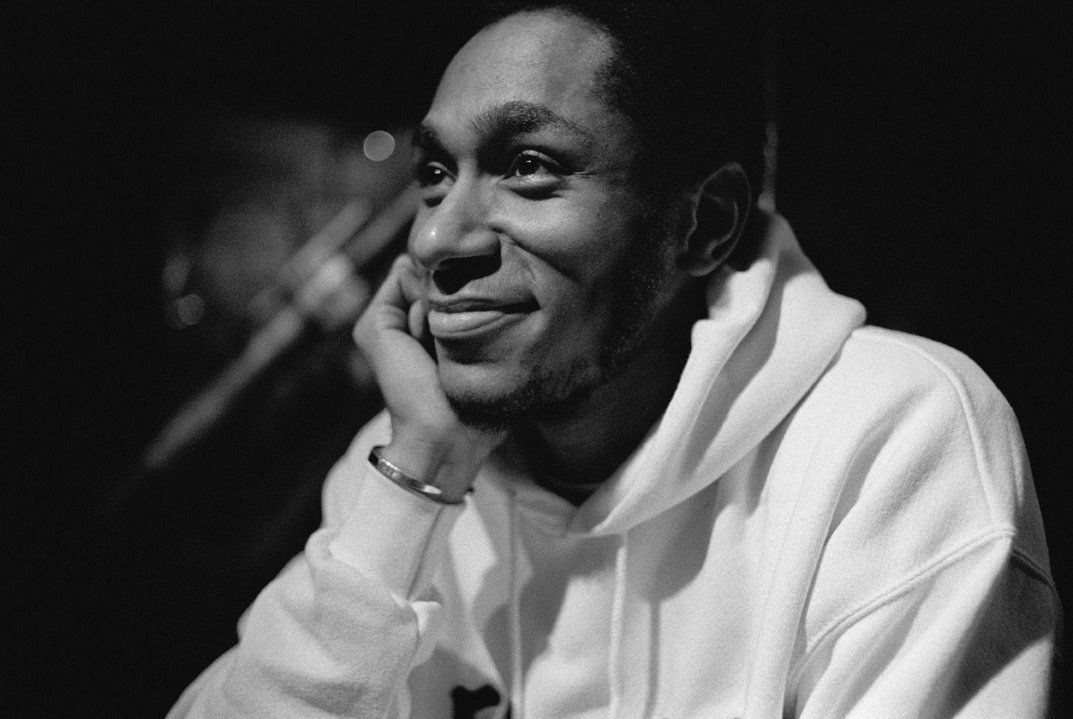
Yasiin Bey in 1999

Bey signed with Rawkus Records and formed the rap group Black Star with Talib Kweli. In 1998, the duo released an album, Mos Def & Talib Kweli Are Black Star. Mostly produced by Hi-Tek, the album featured the singles "Respiration" and "Definition", which both reached the Billboard Hot R&B/Hip-Hop Songs chart.

=== 1999–2006: Solo career and various projects ===
Bey released his solo debut album Black on Both Sides in October 1999, also through Rawkus Records. The single "Ms. Fat Booty" charted, while the album reached No. 25 on the Billboard 200. Around this time, he also contributed to the Scritti Politti album Anomie & Bonhomie.

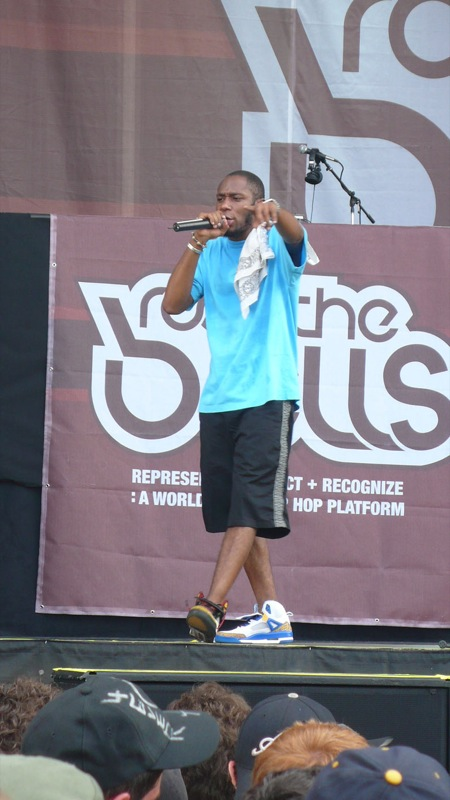
Yasiin Bey performing at Rock the Bells in New York

In January 2002, Rawkus Records was taken over by Geffen Records, which released his second solo album The New Danger in October 2004. It included contributions by Shuggie Otis and Bernie Worrell, Doug Wimbish, and Will Calhoun as the Black Jack Johnson Band. The album reached No. 5 on the Billboard 200, making it the most successful for the artist to date. The single "Sex, Love & Money" charted, and was nominated for a Grammy Award. Bey's final solo album for Geffen Records, titled True Magic, was released in 2006.

=== 2007–2011: Good Music era and name change ===
On November 7, 2007, Bey performed live in San Francisco at The Mezzanine venue. The performance was recorded for an upcoming "Live in Concert" DVD. During the event, he announced that he would be releasing a new album, The Ecstatic. He performed a number of new tracks; in later shows, he previewed tracks produced by Madlib and was rumored to be going to Kanye West for new material. Producer and fellow Def Poet Al Be Back revealed he would be producing on the album as well. The album was released on June 9, 2009; but only Madlib's production had made the cut, along with tracks by Preservation, The Neptunes, Mr. Flash, Madlib's brother Oh No, J. Dilla, and Georgia Anne Muldrow.

Bey appears alongside Kanye West on the track "Two Words" from The College Dropout album, the track "Drunk and Hot Girls" and the bonus track "Good Night" off West's third major album, Graduation. In 2002, he released the 12" single Fine, which was produced by West and featured on the Brown Sugar soundtrack.

In 2007, Bey appeared on Stephen Marley's debut album Mind Control on the song "Hey Baby". He also appeared on the debut album from Apollo Heights on a track titled "Concern". That October, he signed a deal with Downtown Records and appeared on a remix to the song "D.A.N.C.E." by Justice.

In April 2008, he appeared on the title track for a new album by The Roots titled Rising Down. The single, "Life In Marvelous Times", was made officially available through iTunes on November 4, 2008, and was also available for stream on the Roots' website Okayplayer.

In 2009, he worked with Somali-Canadian rapper K'naan to produce the track "America" for K'naan's album Troubadour.

In April 2009, Bey traveled to South Africa for the first time, and performed with The Robert Glasper Experiment at the renowned Cape Town International Jazz Festival. He treated the South African audience with an encore, introduced by his own rendition of John Coltrane's A Love Supreme, followed by a sneak preview of the track "M.D. (Doctor)".

Bey has designed two pairs of limited edition Converse shoes. The shoes were released through Foot Locker stores on August 1, 2009, in limited amounts.

In late 2009, he created his own clothing line with the "UNDRCRWN" brand called the "Mos Def Cut & Sew Collection". The items were released in select U.S. stores and almost exclusively on the UNDRCRWN website. That year, he was among the MCs aligned with American entrepreneur Damon Dash's DD172 and collaborating with American blues rock band the Black Keys on the Blakroc album, a project headed by the Black Keys and Damon Dash. Bey appeared with Harlem-bred rapper Jim Jones and the Black Keys on the Late Show with David Letterman to perform the Blakroc track "Ain't Nothing Like You (Hoochie Coo)".

In 2010, Bey featured on the first single, "Stylo", from the third Gorillaz album, Plastic Beach, alongside soul legend Bobby Womack. He also appeared on the track titled "Sweepstakes". In March 2010, Bey's song "Quiet Dog Bite Hard" was featured in Palm's "Life moves fast. Don't miss a thing." campaign.

In September 2010, after appearing on Kanye West's G.O.O.D. Friday track "Lord Lord Lord", Bey confirmed he had signed with GOOD Music. Bey has been an active contributor to the recovery of the oil spill in the Gulf, performing concerts and raising money towards repairing its damages. In June 2010, he recorded a cover of the classic New Orleans song originally by Smokey Johnson, "It Ain't My Fault" with the Preservation Hall Jazz Band, Lenny Kravitz and Trombone Shorty.

In September 2011, the rapper announced that he legally changed his name to Yasiin Bey and would go by that name, retiring his Mos Def moniker (short for "Most Definitely"). Bey told a reporter "I began to fear that Mos Def was being treated as a product, not a person, so I’ve been going by Yasiin since ’99. At first it was just for friends and family, but now I'm declaring it openly." Bey also stated "Mos Def is a name that I built and cultivated over the years, it's a name that the streets taught me, a figure of speech that was given to me by the culture and by my environment, and I feel I've done quite a bit with that name. ...it's time to expand and move on." Yasiin is a name in the Qur'an's 36th surah and was important to the rapper who converted to Islam in his teens. Bey said the name change would eliminate "having any moniker or separation between the self that I see and know myself as."

Shortly after the name change announcement, Bey recorded as the narrator of the children's hip-hop musical, Pacha's Pajamas: A Story Written By Nature.

=== 2012–present: Later career and retirement ===
In January 2012, it was reported that Bey and Talib Kweli had begun "to resurrect" Black Star. In 2015, Bey was featured on A$AP Rocky's second studio album At. Long. Last. ASAP, on the track "Back Home", alongside Acyde and the deceased A$AP Yams. Bey again revived his Mos Def moniker for two new songs in August 2015, titled "Basquiat Ghostwriter" and "Sensei on the Block".

Hyundai's RE:GENERATION music documentary series partnered with producer Mark Ronson in 2012 to create the jazz track "A La Modeliste." The song featured guest vocals from Erykah Badu and Mos Def (Yasiin Bey), along with legendary New Orleans drummer Zigaboo Modeliste and Trombone Shorty.

On January 19, 2016, Bey announced his retirement from both the music and film industries on Kanye West's website: "I'm retiring from the music recording industry as it is currently assembled today, and also Hollywood, effective immediately. I'm releasing my final album this year, and that's that." After announcing his retirement, he expressed gratitude to everyone who has supported him over the years and revealed his intention to enter the fashion industry and complete a handful of films. Bey also confirmed he still planned to release a collaborative project with Ferrari Sheppard called Dec 99th.

In October 2016, a planned concert in London was cancelled at the last minute; other European dates were also cancelled. On October 14, Bey posted a video to Facebook where he announced that he was still planning to retire: "I'm retiring for real this year, this week. With the 17th anniversary of Black on Both Sides being released, I am grateful to have had the career that I have been able to enjoy." He also announced one last concert which he said he would live stream from Cape Town, South Africa. In November 2016, he was granted the ability to leave but not reenter South Africa and was put on "South Africa's 'undesirable persons' list". He said he would perform one show in Harlem and three in Washington, D.C. after leaving South Africa. He announced that Dec 99th, his final album, would be released on December 9. He released three singles from it, "Local Time", "N.A.W." and "Seaside Panic Room". On December 5, 2016, he announced the title of two albums, Negus in Natural Person and As Promised, the latter of which is a collaboration with Southern hip-hop producer Mannie Fresh, initially titled OMFGOD. In 2017, his claims of retirement were seen as questionable as he played shows on September 13, at the Fox Theater in Oakland as part of Black Star and performed on Gorillaz' Humanz World Tour, performing "Stylo" with Peven Everett, who filled in for Bobby Womack, who died in 2014. He also has yet to release or announce a release date for the last two albums of his career.

In February 2018, Bey announced, on stage, a new Black Star studio album, produced by Madlib, would be released in 2018. However, no specific release date was made available. Later that year, Bey appeared on the titular track of Kids See Ghosts, the collaborative effort of Kanye West and Kid Cudi. In March 2019, he debuted his album, ንጉሥ (pronounced Negus) at a listening session as part of Art Basel Hong Kong. In a press release, he said that the album "will continue to unfold as a series of varied installations around the world". He has no plans of releasing the album digitally or physically.

On June 28, 2019, Bey appeared on Bandana, an album by Freddie Gibbs and Madlib, alongside Black Thought, on a track named "Education". In November 2019, he stated that unreleased music, such as his collaborative album with Mannie Fresh, was still "on deck" for release. In 2021, he launched "The Midnight Miracle" podcast on Luminary, along with Dave Chappelle and Talib Kweli. In April 2022, a release date for the long-awaited Black Star project was officially announced. The album titled No Fear of Time was released via Luminary on May 3, 2022.

In July 2026, Bey was featured in "Stylo" and "Damascus" (the latter with Omar Souleyman) on Gorillaz's album The Mountain; he performed the tracks at the PhillGood music festival in Plovdiv, Bulgaria.

== Acting career ==
=== Beginnings as child actor ===
Prior to his career in music, Bey entered public life as a child actor, having played roles in television movies, sitcoms and theater, some of which were under the name Dante Beze. At the age of 14, he appeared in the TV movie God Bless the Child, starring Mare Winningham, which aired on ABC in 1988. He played the oldest child in the 1990 family sitcom You Take the Kids, shortly before it was cancelled. In 1995, he played the character Dante, Bill Cosby's sidekick on the short-lived detective show The Cosby Mysteries. In 1996, he starred in a Visa check card commercial featuring Deion Sanders. He also had a small role alongside Michael Jackson in his short film and music video Ghosts (1996).

=== Feature films, theater and television ===
After brief appearances in Bamboozled and Monster's Ball, Bey played a rapper who is reluctant to sign with a major label in Brown Sugar. He was nominated for an Image Award and a Teen Choice Award.

In 2001, he took a supporting role to Beyoncé Knowles and Mehki Phifer in the MTV movie Carmen: A Hip Hopera as Lt. Miller, a crooked cop.

In 2002, he played the role of Booth in Suzan-Lori Parks' Topdog/Underdog, a Tony-nominated and Pulitzer-winning Broadway play. He and co-star Jeffrey Wright won a Special Award from the Outer Critics Circle Award for their joint performance. He played Left Ear in the 2003 film The Italian Job. That same year, he appeared in the Alicia Keys music video You Don't Know My Name.

In television, Bey has appeared on NYPD Blue, Comedy Central's Chappelle's Show, and hosted the award-winning HBO spoken word show Def Poetry. He also appeared on the sitcom My Wife and Kids as the disabled friend of Michael Kyle (Damon Wayans).

Bey won "Best Actor, Independent Movie" at the 2005 Black Reel Awards for his portrayal of Detective Sgt. Lucas in The Woodsman. For his portrayal of Vivien Thomas in HBO's film Something the Lord Made, he was nominated for an Emmy and a Golden Globe, and won the Image Award. He also played a bandleader in HBO's Lackawanna Blues. He then landed the role of Ford Prefect in the 2005 movie adaptation of The Hitchhiker's Guide to the Galaxy.

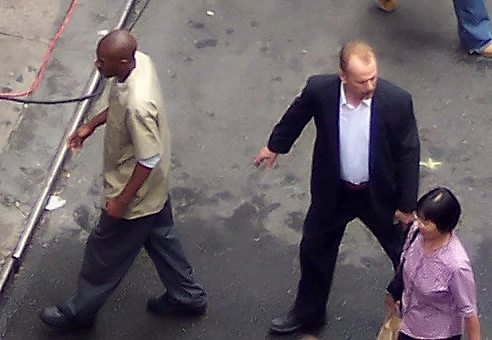
Yasiin Bey and Bruce Willis on the set of 16 Blocks, filmed on location in Chinatown, Manhattan

In 2006, Bey appeared in Dave Chappelle's Block Party alongside Black Star partner Talib Kweli, while also contributing to the film's soundtrack. He was also featured as the banjo player in the Pixie Sketch" from Chappelle's Show: The Lost Episodes, though his appearance was edited out of the DVD. He starred in the action film 16 Blocks alongside Bruce Willis and David Morse. He also landed a recurring guest role on Boondocks, starring as Gangstalicious. He is set to be in Toussaint, a film about Haitian revolutionary Toussaint Louverture, opposite Don Cheadle and Wesley Snipes. He made a cameo appearance as himself in the movie Talladega Nights: The Ballad of Ricky Bobby.

In 2007, Bey narrated the PBS-broadcast documentary Prince Among Slaves.

In 2008, Bey starred in the Michel Gondry movie Be Kind Rewind, playing a video rental store employee whose best friend is played by co-star Jack Black. He also portrayed Chuck Berry in the film Cadillac Records, for which he was nominated for a Black Reel Award and an Image Award.

In 2009, he appeared in the House episode titled "Locked In" as a patient suffering from locked-in syndrome. His performance was well received, with E! saying that Mos Def "delivers an Emmy-worthy performance". He was also in the 2009 film Next Day Air.

In 2010, he appeared on the children's show Yo Gabba Gabba! as Super Mr. Superhero. He also appeared in A Free Man of Color, John Guare's play at the Vivian Beaumont Theatre.

In 2011, he began a multi-episode appearance on the sixth season of Showtime television series Dexter. He played Brother Sam, an ex-convict who has supposedly found religion despite finding himself in violent situations.

In January 2016, Bey announced his retirement from the music and the film industries on Kanye West's website. In March 2016, it was announced that he had been attached to star in "his last live-action film", The Disconnected, a science fiction thriller dealing with policing, identity, and the intersection of technology and humanity.

== Social and political views ==
In 2000, paired with Talib Kweli, Bey organized the Hip Hop for Respect project to speak out against police brutality. It was created in response to the 1999 police shooting of Amadou Diallo, and sought to accumulate 41 artists to the roster, one to match each of the 41 gunshots fired on Diallo.

Bey is well known for his leftist activism. In 2000, he performed a benefit concert for death row inmate Mumia Abu-Jamal. In May 2005, Bey, Talib Kweli, R&B singer Martin Luther and City Councilman Charles Barron approached New York City Hall, demanding the withdrawal of the $1 million bounty for Assata Shakur.

In September 2005, Bey released the single "Katrina Clap", renamed "Dollar Day" for True Magic (utilizing the instrumental for New Orleans rappers UTP's "Nolia Clap"). The song is a criticism of the Bush administration's response to Hurricane Katrina. On the night of the MTV Video Music Awards, Bey pulled up in front of Radio City Music Hall on a flatbed truck and began performing the "Katrina Clap" single in front of a crowd that quickly gathered around him. He was subsequently arrested for not having a public performance permit in his possession.

In October 2006, Bey appeared on 4Real, a documentary television series. Appearing in the episode "City of God", he and the 4Real crew traveled to City of God, a favela in Rio de Janeiro, Brazil, to meet Brazilian MC MV Bill and learn about the crime and social problems of the community.

On September 7, 2007, Bey appeared on Real Time with Bill Maher where he spoke about racism against African Americans, citing the government response to Hurricane Katrina, the Jena Six case, and the murder conviction of Mumia Abu-Jamal. He appeared on Real Time again on March 27, 2009, and spoke about the risk of nuclear weapons.

In September 2011, Bey joined the cast of the environmental children's hip-hop musical Pacha's Pajamas: A Story Written By Nature as narrator. In July 2013, he appeared in a short film released by the human rights organization Reprieve, depicting the forced-feeding methods used at the Guantanamo Bay detention camps. This transpired after a document containing the military instructions for the procedure was leaked.

In September 2018, Bey and advertising executive Free Richardson opened an art exhibition to the public in an art gallery in the South Bronx, called the Compound, centered around hip-hop and fine art. The goal of this gallery was to help bridge the gap between the two fields, by showcasing artists from marginalized backgrounds who normally would not be represented in art galleries. Art forms with negative connotations, such as graffiti, as presented in a more optimal context. "The purpose of the gallery is to say all art is equal," Richardson said. "But we are in the borough that created hip-hop, which is the biggest art form in the world, so it's always an extending arm. It's always present."

Bey has been a longtime supporter of the Palestinian cause.

== Legacy ==
About.com ranked Bey No. 14 on its list of the Top 50 MCs of Our Time, and The Source ranked him No. 23 on their list of the Top 50 Lyricists of All Time. AllMusic called him one of the most promising rappers to emerge in the late 1990s, and one of hip-hop's brightest hopes entering the 21st century. Bey has influenced numerous hip-hop artists throughout his career, including Lupe Fiasco, Jay Electronica, Kid Cudi, Saigon, and Logic. Kendrick Lamar once mentioned Bey as a very early inspiration as a young rapper, though Lamar denied being a part of the conscious rap movement. He has also directly influenced artists outside of hip-hop, including English singer-songwriters Adele and Amy Winehouse.

== Personal life ==
Bey married Maria Yepes in 1996. He filed for divorce from her in 2006. She took him to court over failure in child-support obligations, paying $2,000 short of the monthly $10,000 he had been ordered to pay for their two daughters. He has four other children, including R&B singer and record producer Laila Smith, best known as Laila!.

Bey's mother, Sheron Smith, managed part of her son's career. She was a motivational speaker and authored the book Shine Your Light: A Life Skills Workbook, where she details her experience as a single mother raising him. Smith died in 2023.

In January 2016, Bey was ordered to leave South Africa and not return for five years, having stayed in the country illegally on an expired tourist visa granted in May 2013. That month, he was charged with using an unrecognized World Passport and having lived illegally in South Africa since 2014. He had reportedly recruited Kanye West to help defend him, and posted a message on West's website announcing his retirement from show business. There was a court case in relation to immigration offenses involving him and his family. He was allowed to leave South Africa on November 22, 2016, and was barred from returning.

== Discography ==
=== Solo albums ===
- Black on Both Sides (1999)
- The New Danger (2004)
- True Magic (2006)
- The Ecstatic (2009)
- ንጉሥ (Negus) (2019) (Note: Negus is Yasiin Bey’s fifth studio album, entirely produced by Lord Tusk, Steven Julien, and ACyde and was recorded in London in 2015. Negus was exclusively premiered during Art Basel in Hong Kong on March 29, 2019. According to a press release, the album will never receive a physical or digital release but will be displayed at sound installations around the world.)

=== Collaborative albums ===
- Mos Def & Talib Kweli Are Black Star (with Talib Kweli, as Black Star) (1998)
- Manifest Destiny (with Ces and DCQ, as UTD) (2004)
- December 99th (with Ferrari Sheppard, as Dec 99th) (2016)
- No Fear of Time (with Talib Kweli, as Black Star) (2022)
- Forensics (with The Alchemist) (TBA)

== Filmography ==
| Year | Title | Role | Notes |
|---|---|---|---|
| 1988 | God Bless the Child | Richard Watkins | Television film |
| 1990 | You Take the Kids | Raymond Kirkland | 6 episodes |
| 1991 | The Hard Way | Dead Romeos | |
| 1996 | Michael Jackson's Ghosts | Dante | Short film |
| 1998 | Where's Marlowe? | Wilt Crawley | |
| 2000 | Freestyle: The Art of Rhyme | Himself | Documentary |
| 2000 | Bamboozled | Big Blak Afrika | |
| 2000 | Island of the Dead | Robbie J | |
| 2001 | Carmen: A Hip Hopera | Lieutenant Miller | Television film |
| 2001 | Monster's Ball | Ryrus Cooper | |
| 2002 | Showtime | Lazy Boy | |
| 2002 | Civil Brand | Michael Meadows | |
| 2002 | Brown Sugar | Chris 'Cav' Anton Vichon | |
| 2002 | My Wife and Kids | Tommy | Episode: "Chair Man of the Board" |
| 2003 | The Italian Job | Left Ear | |
| 2004 | The Woodsman | Detective Lucas | |
| 2004 | Chappelle's Show | Black Delegate | Episode: "Samuel Jackson Beer & Racial Draft" |
| 2004 | Something the Lord Made | Vivien Thomas | Television film |
| 2005 | Lackawanna Blues | The Bandleader | Television film |
| 2005 | The Hitchhiker's Guide to the Galaxy | Ford Prefect | |
| 2005– 2008 | The Boondocks | Gangstalicious | Voice role 3 episodes |
| 2006 | Dave Chappelle's Block Party | Himself | Documentary |
| 2006 | 16 Blocks | Eddie Bunker | |
| 2006 | Talladega Nights: The Ballad of Ricky Bobby | Himself | Cameo appearance |
| 2006 | Journey to the End of the Night | Wemba | |
| 2007 | Prince Among Slaves | Narrator | |
| 2008 | Be Kind Rewind | Mike | |
| 2008 | Cadillac Records | Chuck Berry | |
| 2009 | Next Day Air | Eric | |
| 2009 | House | Lee | Episode: "Locked In" |
| 2010 | I'm Still Here | Himself | |
| 2010 | Bouncing Cats | Himself | Documentary |
| 2010 | Yo Gabba Gabba! | Super Mr. Superhero | Episode: "Superhero" |
| 2011 | Dexter | Brother Sam | 5 episodes |
| 2013 | Begin Again | Saul | |
| 2014 | Life of Crime | Ordell Robbie | |
| 2014 | The Getaway | Himself | Episode: "Yasiin Bey in Morocco" |
| 2015 | Amy | Himself | Documentary |

== Accolades ==
=== BET Awards ===
| Year | Category | Nominated work | Result | Refs. |
|---|---|---|---|---|
| 2003 | Best Actor | Brown Sugar | Nominated | |
| 2004 | Best Actor | The Italian Job | Nominated | |

=== Black Movie Awards ===
| Year | Category | Nominated work | Result | Refs. |
|---|---|---|---|---|
| 2006 | Outstanding Performance by an Actor in a Supporting Role | 16 Blocks | Nominated | |

=== Black Reel Awards ===
| Year | Category | Nominated work | Result | Refs. |
|---|---|---|---|---|
| 2003 | Outstanding Actor, Independent Film | Civil Brand | Nominated | |
| 2004 | Outstanding Supporting Actor | The Italian Job | Nominated | |
| 2005 | Outstanding Actor; Independent Film | The Woodsman | Won | |
| 2005 | Outstanding Actor, TV Movie or Mini-Series | Something the Lord Made | Nominated | |
| 2008 | Outstanding Actor | Be Kind Rewind | Nominated | |
| 2008 | Outstanding Supporting Actor | Cadillac Records | Nominated | |

=== Golden Globe Awards ===
| Year | Category | Nominated work | Result | Refs. |
|---|---|---|---|---|
| 2005 | Best Actor – Miniseries or Motion Picture Made for Television | Something the Lord Made | Nominated | |

=== Gotham Awards ===
| Year | Category | Nominated work | Result | Refs. |
|---|---|---|---|---|
| 2004 | Breakthrough Actor | The Woodsman | Nominated | |

=== Grammy Awards ===
| Year | Category | Nominated work | Result | Refs. |
|---|---|---|---|---|
| 2005 | Best Urban/Alternative Performance | "Sex, Love & Money" | Nominated | |
| 2006 | Best Urban/Alternative Performance | "Ghetto Rock" | Nominated | |
| 2007 | Best Rap Solo Performance | "Undeniable" | Nominated | |
| 2008 | Album of the Year | Graduation (as featured artist) | Nominated | |
| 2010 | Best Rap Solo Performance | "Casa Bey" | Nominated | |
| 2010 | Best Rap Album | The Ecstatic | Nominated | |
| 2011 | Best Short Form Music Video | "Stylo" (with Gorillaz and Bobby Womack) | Nominated | |

=== MOBO Awards ===
| Year | Category | Nominated work | Result | Refs. |
|---|---|---|---|---|
| 2000 | Best Hip Hop Act | —N/a | Nominated | |

=== NAACP Image Awards ===
| Year | Category | Nominated work | Result | Refs. |
|---|---|---|---|---|
| 2003 | Outstanding Supporting Actor in a Motion Picture | Brown Sugar | Nominated | |
| 2005 | Outstanding Actor in a Television Movie, Mini-Series or Dramatic Special | Something the Lord Made | Nominated | |
| 2009 | Outstanding Supporting Actor in a Motion Picture | Cadillac Records | Nominated | |

=== NAMIC Vision Awards ===
| Year | Category | Nominated work | Result | Refs. |
|---|---|---|---|---|
| 2005 | Best Dramatic Performance | Something the Lord Made | Nominated | |

=== Online Film & Television Association Awards ===
| Year | Category | Nominated work | Result | Refs. |
|---|---|---|---|---|
| 2004 | Best Actor in a Motion Picture or Miniseries | Something the Lord Made | Nominated | |

=== Primetime Emmy Awards ===
| Year | Category | Nominated work | Result | Refs. |
|---|---|---|---|---|
| 2004 | Outstanding Lead Actor in a Miniseries or a Movie | Something the Lord Made | Nominated | |

=== Satellite Awards ===
| Year | Category | Nominated work | Result | Refs. |
|---|---|---|---|---|
| 2005 | Best Actor in a Miniseries or Motion Picture Made for Television | Something the Lord Made | Nominated | |

=== Stinkers Bad Movie Awards ===
| Year | Category | Nominated work | Result | Refs. |
|---|---|---|---|---|
| 2006 | Most Annoying Fake Accent – Male | 16 Blocks | Nominated | |

=== Teen Choice Awards ===
| Year | Category | Nominated work | Result | Refs. |
|---|---|---|---|---|
| 2003 | Choice Breakout Movie Actor | Brown Sugar | Nominated | |
| 2005 | Choice Movie: Rap Artist | The Hitchhiker's Guide to the Galaxy | Nominated | |

- Nominated — Black Reel Award for Outstanding Actor, TV Movie or Mini-Series
  Nominated — Golden Globe Award for Best Actor – Miniseries or Motion Picture Made for Television
  Nominated — NAACP Image Award for Outstanding Actor in a Television Movie, Mini-Series or Dramatic Special
  Nominated — Online Film & Television Association Award for Best Actor in a Motion Picture or Miniseries
  Nominated — Primetime Emmy Award for Outstanding Lead Actor in a Miniseries or a Movie
  Nominated — Satellite Award for Best Actor in a Miniseries or Motion Picture Made for Television
