= Ferrari Sheppard =

American visual artist

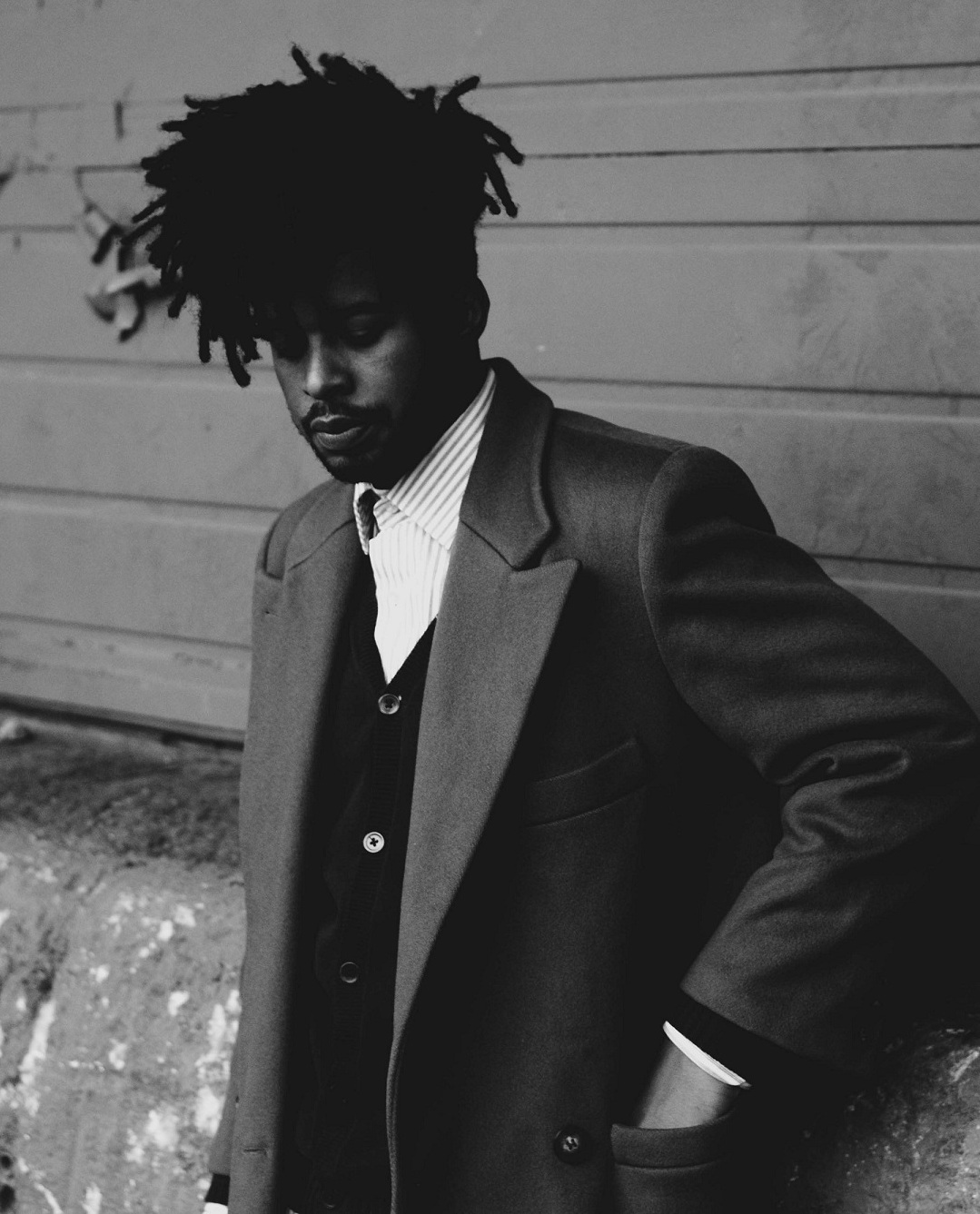
- Sheppard in 2012
- Born: Ferrari Elite Sheppard; March 3, 1983 (age 43); Chicago, Illinois, US
- Education: School of the Art Institute of Chicago (2006)
- Style: Figurative art Abstract art

Ferrari Elite Sheppard (born March 3, 1983) is an American artist. His artistic style is influenced by Willem de Kooning, Cy Twombly and Joan Mitchell, as well as Harlem Renaissance figures like Jacob Lawrence and Romare Bearden. Sheppard is also a member of the hip-hop duo Dec 99th, alongside Yasiin Bey. The duo's album, December 99th, was released in 2016. Sheppard lives and works in Los Angeles, California.

== Early life ==
Sheppard was born in Chicago, Illinois in 1983. After his family returned to Chicago from New York City, Sheppard pursued his passion for the arts at the School of the Art Institute of Chicago (SAIC).

== Career ==
In 2016, Sheppard returned to painting, marking a significant change in his career. He adopted the canvas as his main medium, producing works characterized by layered textures and vivid colors to convey intricate emotional landscapes. His art combines figurative and abstract elements to address themes such as cultural heritage, memory, and self-actualization. The artwork invites viewers to engage with narratives that are both introspective and broadly relatable. Sheppard is represented by Massimo De Carlo.

In May 2025, Sheppard was featured in Vogue Magazine's Met Gala Issue as part of its Superfine Suiting portfolio, which highlighted artists and cultural figures shaping contemporary aesthetics and identity.

== Exhibitions ==
- 2024: Modality – Massimo De Carlo, Hong Kong
- 2024: Jubilee – UTA Artist Space, New York City
- 2023: Crucible, Massimo De Carlo, Museum of Villa Torlonia, Rome, Rome, Italy
- 2023: Portal Study, Massimo De Carlo, Frieze Los Angeles, California
- 2022: Tremendous, Massimo De Carlo, London
- 2022: Walking Together, Massimo De Carlo Pièce Unique, Paris
- 2021: Dark Bodies Bright Crest, Maruani Mercier, Brussels Belgium
- 2021: Positions of Power, UTA Artist Space, Beverly Hills, California
- 2020: Heroines of Innocence – Wilding Cran Gallery, Los Angeles, California

Group Exhibitions

- 2024: Effetto Notte: Day for Night, New American Realism, National Gallery of Ancient Art, Rome, Italy
- 2022: La Vie en Rose, Mariane Ibrahim Gallery, Chicago, Illinois
- 2022: Interscope Reimagined, Los Angeles County Museum of Art, Los Angeles, California
- 2021: Where to begin..., Mariane Ibrahim Gallery, Paris, France
- 2020: MoAD Benefit Auction, San Francisco, California
- 2020: Black Voices Black Microcosm – CF Hill Gallery, Stockholm, Sweden
- 2020: LACMA Group Exhibition – Los Angeles County Museum of Art, Los Angeles, California

Selected Collections

- Aïshti Foundation, Lebanon

== Discography ==
=== As Dec 99th with Yasiin Bey ===
- December 99th (2016)
