= Black Reel Award for Outstanding Actress, Independent Film =

Annual US film award

This article lists the winners and nominees for the Black Reel Award for Outstanding Actress in an Independent Film. This award was first given in 2002, before being retired during the 2006 ceremony.

== Winners and nominees ==
Winners are listed first and highlighted in bold.

=== 2000s ===
Year	Actress	Film	Ref
2002	Combined Actor / Actress		
2002	**Rockmond Dunbar**	**Punks**	
2002	**Allen Payne**	**Blue Hill Avenue**	
2002	Eriq Ebouaney	Lumumba	
2002	Kenny Young	One Week	
2002	Kerry Washington	Lift	
2003
2003	**Erika Alexander**	**30 Years to Life**	
2003	Monica Calhoun	Pandora's Box	
2003	Melissa De Sousa	30 Years to Life	
2004	—N/a		
2005
2005	**Kimberly Elise**	**Woman Thou Art Loosed**	
2005	Golden Brooks	Motives	
2005	Eve	The Woodsman	
