= Satan, His Psychotherapy and Cure by the Unfortunate Dr. Kassler, J.S.P.S. =

1982 novel by Jeremy Leven

Satan: His Psychotherapy and Cure by the Unfortunate Dr. Kassler, J.S.P.S.
- Author: Jeremy Leven
- Language: English
- Genre: Dark comedy, absurdist fiction
- Publisher: Alfred A. Knopf
- Publication date: May 25, 1982
- Publication place: United States
- Media type: Print
- Pages: 478
- ISBN: 0-394-52370-9

Satan: His Psychotherapy and Cure by the Unfortunate Dr. Kassler, J.S.P.S. (ISBN 978-0595145065) is a 496-page novel written in 1982 by Jeremy Leven. The book focuses around the central character, Dr. Kassler, a somewhat disheveled psychiatrist with many personal problems. Kassler is commissioned by the Dark Prince himself to administer psychotherapy. Satan is convinced that being the opponent of God is hard work and that he really just needs someone to listen to his tragic story. In return, he offers Kassler the answer every human seeks: what happens to us after death?

== Plot ==
The book opens with Sy Kassler (not yet Dr. Sy Kassler) traveling to Italy to visit his father. The first few scenes of the book reveal the exposition that eventually leads to Sy's downfall: Sy convinces a young, busty, Italian-speaking maiden into his hotel room. When he awakes, he realizes that she has taken his money from his wallet and given him the lifelong gift of an STI. After this, Sy meets up with his father in a local art museum. While in his father's presence, Sy cannot help but feel as though he is a mere screw-up. With psychology and paternal guidance as his tools at hand, Sy's father is finally able to shoo away his son.

Once outside the art museum, Kassler Senior tells his son how he feels regarding their relationship. He then proceeds to die.

His father's sudden and unexpected death forces Sy to undergo a mental breakdown, followed by a self-analysis on his existence. This ultimately leads Sy to his last resort and a seeming epiphany of all sorts, considering the harsh circumstances of the situation: medical school. Sy decides to go back to school and obtain his degree in psychotherapy.

After a considerable amount of time, and while suffering incredible personal difficulties involving his wife and children — including a trial judging his fitness for custody — Kassler assumes a job at a mental hospital. There, Kassler counsels Satan, who really just wants to tell his story to the good doctor. Satan longs for everlasting empathy and is therefore convinced that if he can just get someone to listen to his story, humankind will understand his perspective. In return, Satan promises to answer the question of life after death.

The rest of the novel follows the characters and how they are each changed through their newfound relationship with Satan. The resolution concentrates on Dr. Kassler's slow descent into insanity and, later, Hell on Earth.

== Reception ==
Ann Gallagher called the book "a brilliant synthesis of irreverent views of religion, psychotherapy, and more ordinary human pitfalls... refreshingly original!" In The New York Times, Peter Andrews praised the novel's fast pacing but noted an imbalance between the twin plots of Kassler and Satan. The review in Kirkus drew parallels with Samuel Shem's The House of God and David Shobin's The Unborn. Jeff Clark in the Library Journal panned the book, saying that its "casual dopey appeal" did not live up to the promise of Leven's first novel Creator.

Together with screenwriter Erik Jendresen, Leven adapted the novel for the film Crazy as Hell, released in 2002.
