= Steven Fechter =

American playwright

Steven Fechter is an American playwright. He is best known for his play, The Woodsman, and co-wrote the screenplay for the film version starring Kevin Bacon and Kyra Sedgwick.

Fetcher grew up in Los Angeles and graduated from Binghamton University. He holds a PhD from the Graduate Theatre Program at Hunter College.

Fetcher teaches screenwriting, film, and theater at John Jay College and at the Fashion Institute of Technology in New York.

Frecher's play, The Woodsman, was adapted for film with Nicole Kassell. The screen play, co-written by Fechter and Kassell, won the Slamdance Film Festival screen play competition and premiered at Sundance. The screenplay was also nominated for the Humanitas Prize for filmwriting.
