= David Shobin =

American obstetrician and author

- Occupation: Obstetrician
- Writing career
- Genre: Medical thriller

David Shobin is an American former obstetrician and author of medical thrillers. Both his first novel, The Unborn (1981), and his second, The Seeding (1982), were published when he was a practicing obstetrician. He gave up obstetrics after delivering 5,000 babies, but continued to teach at the State University at Stony Brook Medical Center.
