= Eriq La Salle =

American actor and filmmaker (born 1962)

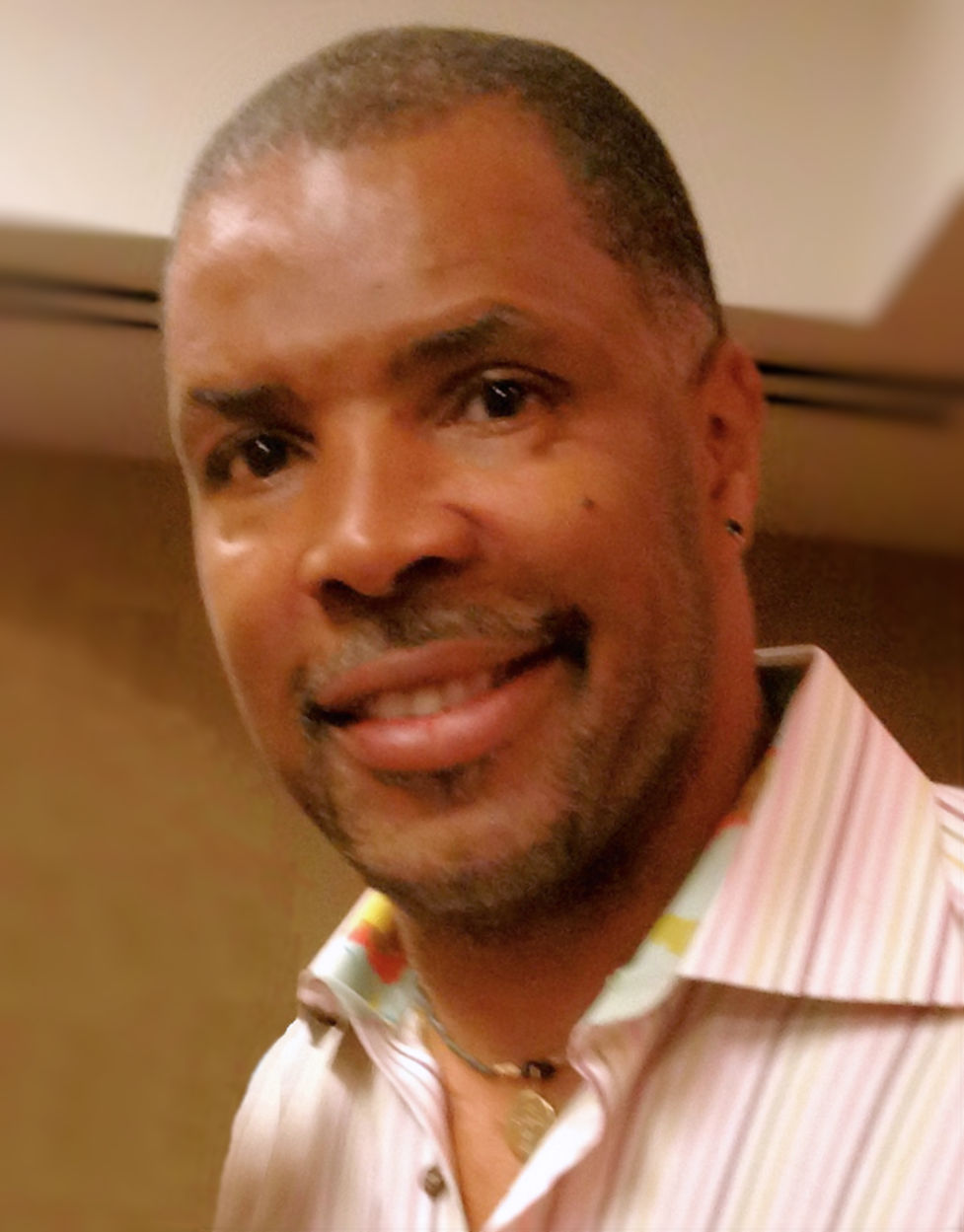
- La Salle in 2012
- Born: Erik Ki La Salle; July 23, 1962 (age 64); Hartford, Connecticut, U.S.
- Education: New York University (BFA)
- Occupations: Actor; director; writer; producer
- Years active: 1985–present

Erik Ki La Salle (born July 23, 1962), professionally known as Eriq La Salle, is an American actor, director, writer and producer. La Salle is known for his performance as Dr. Peter Benton in the NBC medical drama ER (1994–2002; 2009) which earned him three NAACP Image Awards and nominations for a Golden Globe Award and three Primetime Emmy Awards.

== Early life ==
La Salle, one of four children, was born and raised in Hartford, Connecticut, by his mother, Ada Haynes. He is an alumnus of Weaver High School and the Artists Collective, Inc. in Hartford. He attended the Juilliard School's Drama Division for two years as a member of Group 13 (1980–1984), then attended New York University's Tisch School of the Arts, where he earned a Bachelor of Fine Arts degree from the Graduate Acting Program in 1984.

== Career ==
At the time of his graduation from NYU, La Salle was cast in Joseph Papp's Shakespeare in the Park production of Henry V. Soon after, he found continuous acting work on Broadway, off-Broadway, and on several daytime TV dramas including One Life to Live, where he played the reporter Mike Rivers.

In 1988, La Salle co-starred as Darryl Jenks when he was twenty-six years old in the Eddie Murphy movie Coming to America.

In 1994, the medical drama ER premiered on NBC with La Salle starring as Dr. Peter Benton. In the fourth season of the show, he attracted headlines for requesting the interracial relationship between his character and Alex Kingston's Dr. Elizabeth Corday be written out, following thornier relationships with two previous characters played by Black women, saying: "As an African-American man, it becomes a bit offensive if the negative things are all you're showing. Because in real life, we romance and get on each other's nerves and laugh and do all the things that any other race of people do. So if the only time you show a balanced relationship is in an interracial relationship, whether it's conscious or subconscious, it sends a message I'm not comfortable with." While being interviewed by Johnnie Cochran on Johnnie Cochran Tonight, La Salle commented, "We have to take care of the message that we're sending as African-Americans or any other group of minorities, that we have the exact same type of exchanges with our mates that we get to see our White counterparts have."

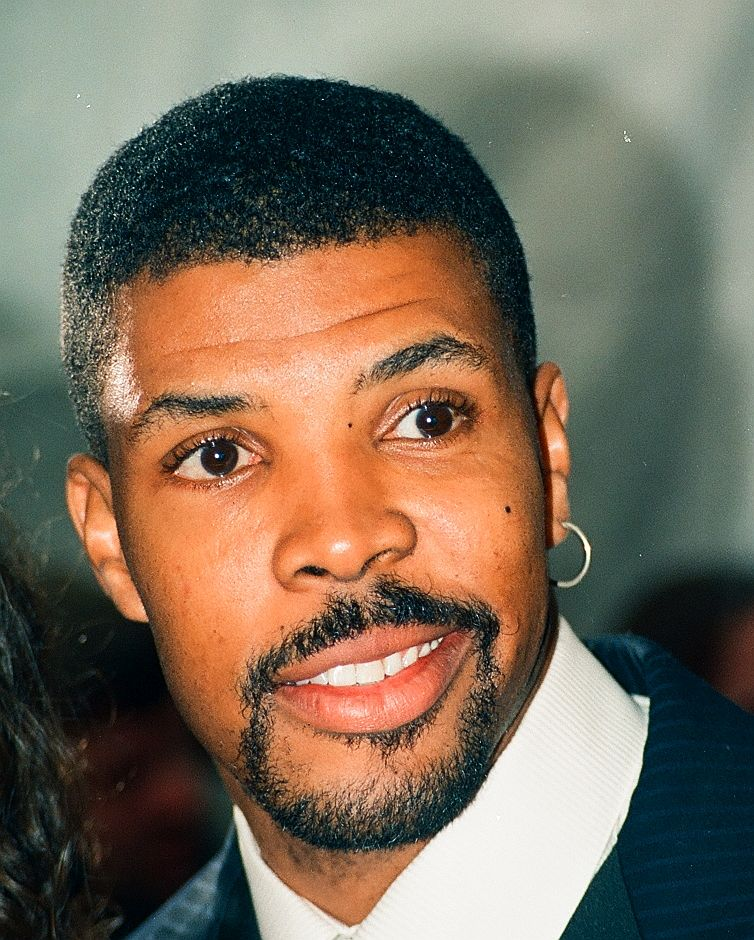
La Salle in 1998

La Salle held the ER role until leaving during its eighth season. He returned to ER for three episodes during its 15th and final season, including an uncredited appearance as himself in the opening of the episode "Heal Thyself" to inform the audience of the death of series creator Michael Crichton; La Salle also directed the episode "The Family Man" during season 15.

In 1996, La Salle began his directorial career with the HBO made-for-TV movie Rebound: The Legend of Earl "The Goat" Manigault, starring Don Cheadle, James Earl Jones and Forest Whitaker. Shortly after that, La Salle directed the pilot for Soul Food: The Series on Showtime.

In 2002, he produced the feature film The Salton Sea. That same year, he produced, directed and starred in the movie Crazy as Hell. In 2003 he wrote, directed and starred in "Memphis", an episode of The Twilight Zone. On January 31, 2003, he made a cameo appearance in Biker Boyz as Slick Will, a mechanic. He played a Jamaican gangster in the independent film Johnny Was opposite Vinnie Jones, Samantha Mumba, Lennox Lewis, and Roger Daltrey. La Salle lived in Belfast for four weeks while filming the movie, which he supported at the premiere of the film during the 2006 American Black Film Festival in Miami.

La Salle starred in the Hallmark Channel original movie, Relative Stranger, which premiered on March 14, 2009. Also in the movie were Cicely Tyson and La Salle's former ER castmates Michael Michele (Dr. Cleo Finch) and Michael Beach (Al Boulet).

In 2010, La Salle played the United Nations Secretary General in the series finale of 24, and guest-starred in an episode of Covert Affairs in August of the same year. In 2011, he played two recurring roles: first as a Caribbean community leader who rallied against the product Rasta Monsta in HBO's How to Make it in America, the second as the neuropsychiatrist E-Mo in CBS' A Gifted Man.

He directed the 2012 Hallmark Channel movie Playing Father, and has directed multiple episodes of Law & Order: Special Victims Unit, CSI: NY, Ringer, and NBC's spinoff Law & Order: Organized Crime.

La Salle's first novel, Laws of Depravity, was published in 2012.

In 2015, La Salle returned to television with a role in Under the Dome's third season, after directing one episode of the second season. He also directed an episode in the third season. He both acted in and directed episodes of CSI: Cyber. He appeared in other series, such as The Night Shift and Madam Secretary.

In 2016, La Salle directed the episode "Wingman" in the Fox series Lucifer and the episode "Black and Blue" of TNT's Murder in the First. He co-starred as Will Munson in the 2017 superhero film Logan. La Salle also directed and produced multiple episodes of Chicago P.D. throughout its many seasons.

== Filmography ==
=== Film ===
| Year | Title | Director | Producer | Notes |
|---|---|---|---|---|
| 1996 | Psalms from the Underground | Yes | No | Short film |
| 2002 | The Salton Sea | No | Yes | |
| 2002 | Crazy as Hell | Yes | Yes | |

Acting roles

| Year | Title | Role | Notes |
|---|---|---|---|
| 1985 | Rappin' | Ice | |
| 1985 | Cut and Run | Fargas | |
| 1986 | Where Are the Children? | Deputy Bernie Miles | |
| 1987 | Five Corners | Samuel Kemp | |
| 1988 | Coming to America | Darryl Jenks | |
| 1990 | Jacob's Ladder | Frank | |
| 1994 | Color of Night | Anderson | |
| 1994 | Drop Squad | Bruford Jamison Jr | |
| 2002 | One Hour Photo | Det. James Van Der Zee | |
| 2002 | Crazy as Hell | Barnett | |
| 2003 | Biker Boyz | Tariq 'Slick Will' | Uncredited |
| 2005 | The Seat Filler | Alonso Grant | Uncredited |
| 2005 | Inside Out | Doctor Peoples | |
| 2005 | Conviction | Peter Seidman | |
| 2006 | Johnny Was | Julius | |
| 2017 | Logan | Will Munson | |

=== Television series ===
| Year | Title | Director | Executive producer | Actor | Notes |
|---|---|---|---|---|---|
| 2000 | Soul Food | Yes | No | No | Episode "The More Things Change" |
| 2003 | The Twilight Zone | Yes | No | Yes | Episode "Memphis" |
| 2007 | Without a Trace | Yes | No | Yes | Episode "Desert Springs" |
| 2007–2008 | Law & Order: Special Victims Unit | Yes | No | Yes | 2 episodes |
| 1994-2009 | ER | Yes | No | Yes | 172 episodes |
| 2009 | Old Skool | Yes | No | No | TV special |
| 2010 | CSI: NY | Yes | No | No | Episode "Pot of Gold" |
| 2011–2012 | Ringer | Yes | No | No | 2 episodes |
| 2011-2012 | A Gifted Man | Yes | No | Yes | 5 episodes |
| 2014 | Crisis | Yes | No | No | Episode "Best Laid Plans" |
| 2014 | Madam Secretary | Yes | No | Yes | Episode "Blame Canada" |
| 2014–2015 | The Night Shift | Yes | No | No | 5 episodes |
| 2014–2015 | Under the Dome | Yes | No | Yes | 5 episodes |
| 2015–2016 | CSI: Cyber | Yes | No | No | 3 episodes |
| 2015 | The Messengers | No | Yes | No | Episode "Eye in the Sky" |
| 2015 | Rosewood | Yes | No | No | Episode "Vitamins and Vandals" |
| 2015 | Battle Creek | Yes | No | No | Episode "Gingerbread Man" |
| 2016 | Lucifer | Yes | No | No | Episode "Wingman" |
| 2016 | Once Upon a Time | Yes | No | No | Episode "Ruby Slippers" |
| 2016 | Murder in the First | Yes | No | No | Episode "Black and Blue" |
| 2016–2021 | Chicago P.D. | Yes | Yes | No | 21 episodes |
| 2016–2017 | Chicago Med | Yes | No | No | 2 episodes |
| 2017 | Chicago Justice | Yes | No | No | Episode "Dead Meat" |
| 2017 | APB | Yes | No | No | Episode "Fueling Fires" |
| 2017 | The Quad | Yes | No | No | Episode "#TheCagedBirdSings" |
| 2017 | Training Day | Yes | No | No | Episode "Elegy: Part 2" |
| 2017 | The Librarians | Yes | No | No | Episode "And the Steal of Fortune" |
| 2021–2025 | Law & Order: Organized Crime | Yes | No | No | 2 episodes |
| 2022–2026 | Law & Order | Yes | No | No | 5 episodes |
| 2024–2025 | FBI | Yes | No | No | 1 episode |
| 2025 | On Call | Yes | Yes | Yes | |

=== Television movies ===
| Year | Title | Director | Producer |
|---|---|---|---|
| 1996 | Rebound: The Legend of Earl "The Goat" Manigault | Yes | No |
| 1999 | Mind Prey | No | Yes |
| 2013 | Playing Father | Yes | No |

Acting roles

| Year | Title | Role |
|---|---|---|
| 1985 | Out of the Darkness | Bobby |
| 1988 | What Price Victory | Trumayne James |
| 1989 | Magic Moments | Dancing Guy |
| 1989 | When We Were Young | Virgil Hawkins |
| 1990 | Hammer, Slammer, & Slade | Jack Spade |
| 1991 | Eyes of a Witness | Mchumbo |
| 1993 | Empty Cradle | Detective Knoll |
| 1996 | Rebound: The Legend of Earl "The Goat" Manigault | Diego |
| 1999 | Mind Prey | Lucas Davenport |
| 2009 | Relative Stranger | Walter Clemons |
| 2009 | MegaFault | Charley 'Boomer' Baxter |

== Bibliography ==
=== Comic books ===
- 25 to Life (3 issues, 12-Gauge Comics) (2010)

=== Novels ===
- Laws of Depravity (2012)
- Laws of Wrath (2014)
- Laws of Annihilation (2023)
- Laws of Solomon (2026)

== Awards and nominations ==
| Year | Association | Category | Work | Result |
|---|---|---|---|---|
| 1995 | Primetime Emmy Awards | Outstanding Supporting Actor in a Drama Series | ER | Nominated |
| 1995 | Screen Actors Guild Awards | Outstanding Performance by an Ensemble in a Drama Series | ER | Nominated |
| 1996 | Magnolia Stage Award | Best Supporting Actor | ER | Won |
| 1996 | NAACP Image Awards | Outstanding Actor in a Drama Series | ER | Nominated |
| 1996 | Screen Actors Guild Awards | Outstanding Performance by an Ensemble in a Drama Series | ER | Won |
| 1997 | Golden Globe Awards | Best Supporting Actor in a Series, Miniseries or Television Film | ER | Nominated |
| 1997 | NAACP Image Awards | Outstanding Actor in a Drama Series | ER | Nominated |
| 1997 | Online Film & Television Association | Best Supporting Actor in a Drama Series | ER | Nominated |
| 1997 | Primetime Emmy Awards | Outstanding Supporting Actor in a Drama Series | ER | Nominated |
| 1997 | Screen Actors Guild Awards | Outstanding Performance by an Ensemble in a Drama Series | ER | Won |
| 1997 | Viewers for Quality Television | Best Supporting Actor in a Quality Drama Series | ER | Nominated |
| 1998 | NAACP Image Awards | Outstanding Actor in a Drama Series | ER | Nominated |
| 1998 | Online Film & Television Association | Best Supporting Actor in a Drama Series | ER | Nominated |
| 1998 | Primetime Emmy Awards | Outstanding Supporting Actor in a Drama Series | ER | Nominated |
| 1998 | Screen Actors Guild Awards | Outstanding Performance by an Ensemble in a Drama Series | ER | Won |
| 1999 | NAACP Image Awards | Outstanding Actor in a Drama Series | ER | Won |
| 1999 | Online Film & Television Association | Best Supporting Actor in a Drama Series | ER | Nominated |
| 1999 | Screen Actors Guild Awards | Outstanding Performance by an Ensemble in a Drama Series | ER | Won |
| 2000 | NAACP Image Awards | Outstanding Actor in a Drama Series | ER | Won |
| 2000 | Screen Actors Guild Awards | Outstanding Performance by an Ensemble in a Drama Series | ER | Nominated |
| 2001 | NAACP Image Awards | Outstanding Actor in a Drama Series | ER | Nominated |
| 2001 | Screen Actors Guild Awards | Outstanding Performance by an Ensemble in a Drama Series | ER | Nominated |
| 2002 | NAACP Image Awards | Outstanding Actor in a Drama Series | ER | Won |
| 2003 | Black Reel Awards | Outstanding Independent Actor | Crazy as Hell | Won |
| 2003 | Black Reel Awards | Outstanding Independent Film | Crazy as Hell | Nominated |
| 2009 | NAACP Image Awards | Outstanding Directing in a Drama Series | Law & Order: Special Victims Unit; Episode: "PTSD" | Nominated |
| 2010 | NAACP Image Awards | Outstanding Actor in a Television Movie, Mini-Series or Dramatic Special | Relative Stranger | Nominated |
