= Crazy as Hell =

- DVD cover
- Directed by: Eriq La Salle
- Written by: Jeremy Leven; Erik Jendresen
- Based on: Satan: His Psychotherapy and Cure by the Unfortunate Dr. Kassler, J.S.P.S. by Jeremy Leven
- Produced by: Ken Aguado; Samuel Benedict; D.J. Caruso; Eriq La Salle; Butch Robinson
- Starring: Michael Beach; Ronny Cox; John C. McGinley; Tia Texada; Sinbad; Eriq La Salle; Tracy Pettit
- Cinematography: George Mooradian
- Edited by: Troy Takaki
- Music by: Billy Childs
- Production companies: Humble Journey Films; Loose Screw Films
- Distributed by: Lions Gate Films; DEJ Productions
- Release date: September 27, 2002
- Running time: 113 minutes
- Country: United States
- Language: English

Crazy as Hell is a 2002 psychological film that is based on the 1982 novel Satan: His Psychotherapy and Cure by the Unfortunate Dr. Kassler, J.S.P.S. by Jeremy Leven and follows Dr. Ty Adams (Michael Beach), an aggressive and overconfident psychiatrist producing a documentary film about a nearby state-run mental hospital. While treating a new patient (Eriq La Salle, who also directed) who claims to be Satan, Dr. Adams begins to question his own perceptions.

== Plot ==
Psychiatrist Dr. Ty Adams comes to the Sedah State Mental Hospital to film a documentary. While coming across self-assured and overconfident, Adams is secretly haunted by the death of his daughter. He strikes up a friendship with the facility's administrator, Dr. Samuel Delazo, playing an ongoing chess game with him. Adams is intrigued by a patient who claims to be Satan and takes a personal interest in his case.

When a patient goes to the roof to commit suicide, Adams arrogantly prevents the police from accessing the roof and attempts to talk her down himself. Satan inexplicably appears on the rooftop and reveals jarring truths about Adams, and the patient subsequently jumps to her death. The incident calls a halt to the documentary. Adams declares him a danger to the other patients and has him placed in solitary.

Adams tracks down his mother and, satisfied that he had found out that his real name is William Barnett Jr., the son of a Baptist preacher who was killed by a junkie. As Adams prepares to move on from the facility, he and Dr. Delazo regretfully say their goodbyes, their chess game unfinished. Just before he leaves, Barnett's mother arrives and asks him to take a fruit basket to her son. She asks Adams if he believes in God, and he replies that he does not.

He takes one last look at Barnett straitjacketed in his cell, but when he is distracted by an orderly, he looks back into the room to find it empty. Turning back to the hallway, he sees Barnett's mother taking off a wig, revealing herself to be Barnett in women's clothes. Pursuing him, Adams stumbles into a bedroom where he finds his own bloody corpse, apparently having killed himself over his daughter's death.

He suddenly is in a library, where Dr. Delazo sits on a throne as the devil surrounded by the patients and staff, all horribly transformed. Delazo says, "Checkmate." Adams shouts that it is not real, and that he knows who he is. Delazo asks "Who are you?" Adams says he is a good man. Delazo replies "Then why are you here?" As Adams keeps protesting that he is a good man, the screen fades to black.

== Cast ==
- Michael Beach as Dr. Ty Adams
- Eriq La Salle as William Barnett, Jr.
- Ronny Cox as Dr. Samuel Delazo
- Sinbad as Jefferson
- Jane Carr as Nurse Danza
- Shelley Robertson as Veda Adams
- Khylan Jones as Brianna Adams
- Twink Caplan as Suzanne
- John C. McGinley as Parker
- David Backus as Todd
- Matthew A. Thomas as Stretch McGuffin
- William Bassett as Mr. Brennan
- Jim Ortlieb as Mr. Tobin
- Roberta Haze as Ms. Aslee
- Tom Everett as Mansell
- Ray Xifo as Selden
- Tia Texada as Lupa Donati
- J. P. Manoux as Arnie
- Tracy Pettit as Cheryl

== Reception ==
Reviews for the film have been mixed and the movie holds a rating of 53% on Rotten Tomatoes, based on 14 reviews and an average rating of 5.3/10. In their review for the film, the New York Times wrote that the movie was an "ambitious first feature" and that it had "a moral ambiguity far beyond most independent films, where humanism is gospel and the characters are always discovering their inner goodness." Variety criticized the film in their review, which they felt was "An erratic, psychobabbling jumble of scenes that never builds to any discernible point".

The A.V. Club was mixed in their review, writing "Crazy As Hell would make for a pretty good Twilight Zone episode, but stretched to feature length, it tends to feel stilted and heavy-handed. The film gives the devil (and the actor playing him) his due, but shortchanges everyone else."
