= Buckshot discography =

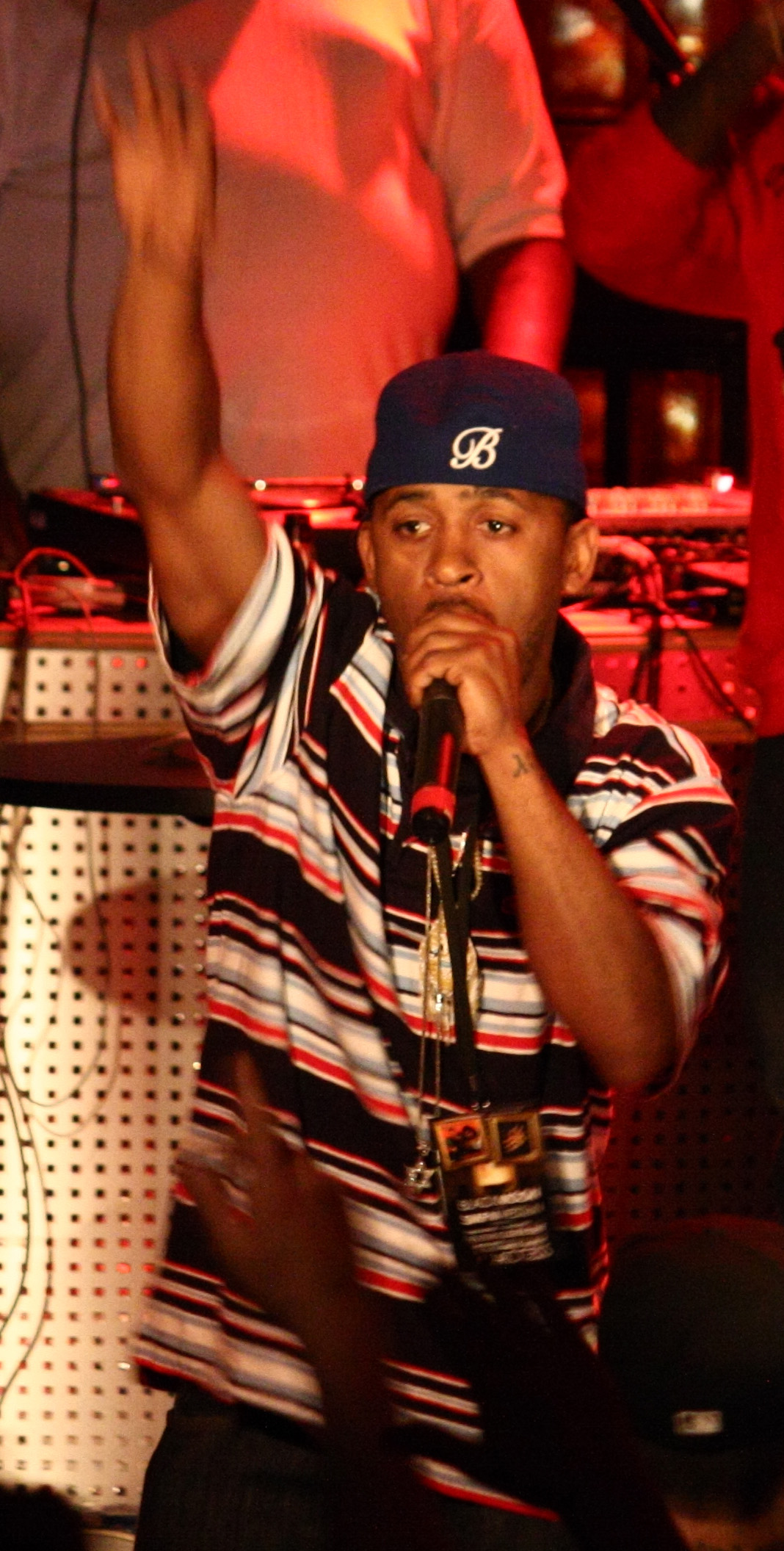
- Buckshot at Le Belmont, Montreal in 2009
- Studio albums: 7
- Remix albums: 1
- Audiobook: 1

Kenyatta Blake, who is known professionally as Buckshot is an American hip-hop recording artist from Crown Heights, Brooklyn. His discography consists of fifteen studio albums, including two solo albums, three collaborative albums with 9th Wonder, one collaborative album with KRS-One, one collaborative album with P-Money, four albums as one-third of group Black Moon, and four albums as member of supergroup Boot Camp Clik, as well as one remix album, an audiobook, numerous singles and many guest appearances on other artists' songs.

== Studio albums ==
List of studio albums, with selected chart positions and information
Title	Album details	Peak chart positions					
Title	Album details	US	US Sales	US R&B	US Rap	US Indie	US Heat.
The BDI Thug	Released: October 26, 1999; Label: Duck Down (DDM 1001); Format: CD, digital download, LP	—	—	63	—	—	21
Chemistry (with 9th Wonder)	Released: June 21, 2005; Label: Duck Down (DDM 2012); Format: CD, digital download, LP	—	—	69	—	34	25
The Formula (with 9th Wonder)	Released: April 29, 2008; Label: Duck Down (DDM 2070); Format: CD, digital download, LP	137	137	47	18	17	2
Survival Skills (with KRS-One)	Released: September 15, 2009; Label: Duck Down (DDM 2120); Format: CD, digital download, LP	62	62	19	11	9	—
The Solution (with 9th Wonder)	Released: November 13, 2012; Label: Duck Down (DDM 2175); Format: CD, digital download, LP	—	196	28	19	—	—
Backpack Travels (with P-Money)	Released: June 24, 2014; Label: Duck Down (DDM 2370); Format: CD, digital download, LP	—	197	34	19	—	8
The Package	Released: July 10, 2026; Label: Duck Down (DDM 4190); Format: digital download, LP	—	—	—	—	—	—

== Remix albums ==
List of remix albums, showing year released
Title	Details
Alter the Chemistry (with Black Moon)	Released: September 26, 2006; Label: Bucktown USA Ent (BTU 5002); Format: CD, digital download

== Audiobooks ==
List of audiobooks, showing year released
Title	Details
The Common Knowledge of the Entertainment Industry	Released: January 25, 2011; Label: Duck Down (DDM 2210); Format: CD, digital download

== Group albums ==
=== Black Moon ===
List of Black Moon studio albums, showing year released
Title	Details
Enta da Stage	Released: October 19, 1993; Label: Wreck/Nervous (NRV 2002); Format: Cassette, CD, LP
War Zone	Released: February 23, 1999; Label: Priority (50039); Format: CD, LP
Total Eclipse	Released: October 7, 2003; Label: Duck Down (DDM 2005); Format: CD, LP
Rise of da Moon	Released: October 18, 2019; Label: Duck Down (DDM 2910); Format: CD, digital download, LP

List of Black Moon remix compilation albums, showing year released
Title	Details
Diggin' in dah Vaults	Released: October 29, 1996; Label: Wreck/Nervous (NRV 20232); Format: Cassette, CD, LP

=== Boot Camp Clik ===
List of Boot Camp Clik studio albums, showing year released
Title	Details
For the People	Released: May 20, 1997; Label: Priority (50646); Format: Cassette, CD, LP
The Chosen Few	Released: October 8, 2002; Label: Duck Down (DDM 2000); Format: CD, LP
The Last Stand	Released: July 18, 2006; Label: Duck Down (DDM 2035); Format: CD, LP
Casualties of War	Released: August 14, 2007; Label: Duck Down (DDM 2055); Format: CD, LP

List of Boot Camp Clik greatest hits albums, showing year released
Title	Details
Basic Training: Boot Camp Clik's Greatest Hits	Released: March 14, 2000; Label: Priority (23052); Format: Cassette, CD, LP

== Charted singles ==
List of singles as featured artist, with selected chart positions, showing year released and album name
Title	Year	Peak chart positions		Album
Title	Year	US	US R&B	Album
"Who Got the Props?" (performed by Black Moon)	1993	86	60	Enta da Stage
"How Many Emcees (Must Get Dissed)" (performed by Black Moon)	1993	120	97	Enta da Stage
"I Got Cha Opin" (performed by Black Moon)	1994	93	55	Enta da Stage
"Crooklyn" (performed by the Crooklyn Dodgers)	1994	60	32	Crooklyn, Volume 1: Music from the Motion Picture
"Buck Em Down" (performed by Black Moon)	1994	124	81	Enta da Stage
"The Points" (performed The Notorious B.I.G., Coolio, Doodlebug, Big Mike, Buckshot, Redman, Ill Al Skratch, Heltah Skeltah, Bone Thugs-n-Harmony, Busta Rhymes, Menace Clan or 5th Ward Boyz, Jamal)	1995	—	80	Panther (The Original Motion Picture Soundtrack)
"Two Turntables & a Mic" (performed by Black Moon)	1999	—	82	War Zone
"5 Boroughs" (performed by KRS-One, Bounty Killer, Buckshot, Cam'ron, Keith Murray, Killah Priest, Prodigy, Redman, Run and Vigilante)	1999	—	79	The Corruptor: The Soundtrack

== Guest appearances ==
List of non-single guest appearances, with other performing artists, showing year released and album name
Title	Year	Other artist(s)	Album
"No Joke / Follow Me"	1997	Funkmaster Flex	The Mix Tape, Volume II: 60 Minutes of Funk
"Get Down With Me"	1997	Amari	Nothing to Lose: Music from and Inspired by the Motion Picture
"Blown Away"	1998	Cocoa Brovaz	The Rude Awakening
"Light Shit Up"	1998	Kurupt	Kuruption!
"Show Down"	1998	Funkmaster Flex, Q-Tip	The Mix Tape, Vol. III
"Follow Me"	1998	Kid Capri, Cocoa Brovaz	Soundtrack to the Streets
"For the Money"	1998	Mack 10, Ol' Dirty Bastard	The Recipe
"We Got U Opin (Part 2)"	1998	Flipmode Squad	The Imperial
"Intrigued"	1999	Cocoa Brovaz	Whiteboys (Original Motion Picture Soundtrack)
"Suspect Niggaz"	1999	Originoo Gunn Clappaz, Havoc	The M-Pire Shrikez Back
"Jump Up"	1999	Black Moon	Duck Down Presents: The Album
"Eye of the Scorpio"	1999	Rock	Duck Down Presents: The Album
"You Can't Fuck With Us"	1999	TJ Swan, Steele	Duck Down Presents: The Album
"Eye of the Storm"	1999	Ice-T	The Seventh Deadly Sin
"The Illest It Gets"	2001	Hi-Tek	Hi-Teknology
"Smatch Ça"	2001	Ol' Kainry	Au Delà Des Apparences
"Nobody Move"	2002	Krumb Snatcha, Craig G	Respect All Fear None
"Military Minds"	2002	2Pac, Cocoa Brovaz	Better Dayz
"U Know How We Do"	2002	DJ Deuse, Sammy Deluxe	Art of War
"2 Hits & Pass"	2002	Agallah, Tony Touch, Craig G, Big Tigger, Smuv, Afu-Ra, MC Serch, Steele, Mr. Eon, Scram Jones	D&D Project II
"En Alerte"	2003	Starflam	Donne-Moi de l'amour
"Boot Camp Skit"	2004	Demon	Music That You Wanna Hear
"Music That You Wanna Hear"	2004	Demon	Music That You Wanna Hear
"Brooklyn Blocks"	2004	Masta Ace	Hits U Missed
"Boot Camp March"	2004	Smif-N-Wessun	Still Shinin
"How We Get Down"	2004	Bobby Cheeks	A Soldier's Story
"How We Do"	2004	PVP, Sea Price	Elfach Nut
"Booty"	2004	Caribbean Xchange	Section 8
"Don't Worry"	2004	Caribbean Xchange	Section 8
"Move On"	2004	Caribbean Xchange	Section 8
"On the Smash"	2004	Originals 213	Ready for the Game
"Fake Neptune"	2005	Sean Price, Steele, Louieville Sluggah	Monkey Barz
"Bye Bye"	2005	Sean Price	Monkey Barz
"City of Godz (Ciudad de Dios)"	2005	Tek & Steele	Smif 'n' Wessun: Reloaded
"Wannabattle Tactics"	2005	Main Flow, Killah Priest, Donte	Notebook Assassins
"A La Lettre"	2006	Akro, Steele	L'Encre, La Sueur Et Le Sang
"Get Yours"	2006	Oh No	Exodus into Unheard Rhythms
"Hustlers"	2006	Shiest Bubz, Agallah, Smif-N-Wessun	The Purple Album
"Oh Yeah"	2006	Tek, General Steele, Rock, Louieville Sluggah	I Got This
"Cardiac"	2007	Sean Price, Ruste Juxx, Flood	Jesus Price Supastar
"Da God"	2007	Sean Price, Sadat X	Jesus Price Supastar
"Take a Time"	2007	Jazz Liberatorz	Clin D'Oeil
"Boston to Bucktown"	2007	Special Teamz, Sean Price	Stereotypez
"Go Around"	2007	Marco Polo	Port Authority
"Worldwide"	2007	El Sicario	La Ley De Ohm
"Ganjaman"	2007	Bouncer Crew	Xtasy for Ladies
"BCCC (Frankenstein)"	2007	Sean Price, Tek	Master P
"Hit N Run"	2007	Deezuz	Souldenera
"Backlash"	2007	9th Wonder, Sean Boog	The Dream Merchant Vol. 2
"Backwoods Roll"	2008	The Legend$, Rino Latina II	Justice
"The Pledge"	2008	Kidz in the Hall, Sean Price	The In Crowd
"300 B.C."	2008	Rock, 5ft, Klust-Stone	Shell Shock
"So Damn Tuff"	2008	Heltah Skeltah, Ruste Juxx	D.I.R.T. (Da Incredible Rap Team)
"Everything U Want"	2009	B-Real	Smoke n Mirrors
"A Toast to Bucktown"	2009	General Steele, Jo Chris	Welcome to Bucktown
"Bullseye"	2009	Sadat X, Jak Danielz	Brand New Bein'
"Momma I Want to Sing"	2009	Sean Price	Kimbo Price
"Make Way"	2009	Snowgoons, Chief Kamachi, Reef the Lost Cauze	The Trojan Horse
"The Feeling"	2009	Mick Boogie, Peter Bjorn and John, GZA, Tabi Bonney	Re-Living Thing
"Keep It Movin'"	2009	67 Mob	Raising the Bar
"Better Than You"	2010	Duck Down All-Stars, Skyzoo, Promise, Sean Price	NBA 2K11 (soundtrack)
"The Now or Never"	2010	Skyzoo, Styles P	Live from the Tape Deck
"Make Movez"	2010	Doc Ish, Colloso, Rock	The First Treatment
"À La Vie, À La Mort"	2011	Taktika, KRS-One	À Bout Portant
"Ain't Coming Down"	2011	David Dallas	The Rose Tint
"Night Time"	2011	Pete Rock, Smif-N-Wessun	Monumental
"Summer Nights"	2011	B.E.N.E.F.I.T.	The Time Is Now
"That Feeling"	2011	J-Love, Sean Price	Grown Man Rap
"Everybody's Watching"	2012	David Stones	The Steppin' Stone: All Or Nuthin'
"Frankenberry"	2012	Sean Price	Mic Tyson
"Killuminati"	2013	P-Money	Gratitude
"Side"	2013	CJ Fly	Thee Way Eye See It
"Don't Front" {Bonus Track}	2013	Eminem	The Marshall Mathers LP 2
"The Chase"	2013	Kid Tsu, Chubb Rock, Jeru the Damaja, Pharoahe Monch	The Chase
"Evolution 300"	2013	Tracey Lee, Black Rob, Feva, Kurupt, Madd Rapper	Live From the 215
"At Night (3am Shit)"	2014	9th Wonder	Jamla Is the Squad
"Murder Game"	2015	Statik Selektah, Smif-N-Wessun, Young M.A	Lucky 7
"The Century"	2015	Jonathan Emile	The Lover/Fighter Document LP
"365"	2016	Craig G, Ras Kass, Rock	I Rap and Go Home
"Just Live"	2016	General Steele, Es-K	Building Bridges
"Apartheid"	2017	Sean Price, Steele	Imperius Rex
"Poof"	2017	Rock	Rockness A.P.
"No Props"	2018	Keith Murray, R-Kitech	Lord of the Metaphor
"Life in Crooklyn"	2019	Planit Hank, AZ, Jeru the Damaja	Night Before Purgatory
"Watch Yo Back"	2019	Diamond D, Steele, Rockness	The Diam Piece 2
"Turnstyle"	2024	Talib Kweli, J. Rawlz, Skyzoo	The Confidence of Knowing
"Detection"	2024	General Steele, Es-k, Rim	Building Bridges 2
"On My Soul"	2025	Smif-n-Wessun, Yountie Strickland	Infinity
"Thelonius"	2026	Kurupt, Masta Killa, Rim, Trigga tha Gambler	The Godbody LP

== Production discography ==
List of production credits (excluding executive producer credits), showing selected information
Year	Song	Artist	Album	Notes
1993	"Powaful Impak!"	Black Moon	Enta da Stage	co-producer; produced by DJ Evil Dee
1996	"Intro (Here We Come)"	Heltah Skeltah, Starang Wondah	Nocturnal	produced w/ Lord Jamar
1996	"Who Dat?"	Heltah Skeltah	Nocturnal	
1996	"God Don't Like Ugly"	Originoo Gunn Clappaz	Da Storm	co-produced w/ Lord Jamar
1997	"No Joke / Follow Me"	Funkmaster Flex	The Mix Tape, Volume II: 60 Minutes of Funk	produced w/ Funkmaster Flex
1997	"Night Riders"	Buckshot, Smif-N-Wessun, LaVoice	For the People	produced w/ Boogie Brown
1997	"Blackout"	BJ Swan, Rock, Starang Wondah, Louieville Sluggah, Supreme, Steele, Illa Noyz	For the People	produced w/ Boogie Brown
1997	"Likkle Youth Man Dem"	The Fab 5	For the People	produced w/ Boogie Brown
1997	"Last Time"	Buckshot, BJ Swan, Steele, FLOW	For the People	produced w/ Boogie Brown
1999	"You Can't Fuck With Us"	Buckshot, BJ Swan, Steele	Duck Down Presents: The Album	produced w/ Boogie Brown
1999	"Take Your Time"	Buckshot, BJ Swan, Jessica Darby	The BDI Thug	produced w/ Boogie Brown
1999	"Boom Bye Bye"	Buckshot, Top Dog	The BDI Thug	co-producer; produced by Baby Paul
