= Basic Training: Boot Camp Clik's Greatest Hits =

Greatest hits album by Boot Camp Clik
- Released: March 14, 2000
- Recorded: 1992–1999
- Genre: Hip-hop
- Length: 58:02
- Label: Duck Down; Priority
- Producer: Buckshot (exec.); Drew "Dru-Ha" Friedman (exec.); Da Beatminerz; Black Market; Boogie Brown; Cuzin Bob; E-Swift; Self; Starang Wondah; Swan

Boot Camp Clik chronology
For The People (1997)	Basic Training: Boot Camp Clik's Greatest Hits (2000)	The Chosen Few (2002)

Professional ratings
Review scores
Source	Rating
AllMusic	4.5/5 stars

Basic Training is a greatest hits album by American hip-hop collective Boot Camp Clik, composed of singles released by Black Moon, Smif-N-Wessun, Heltah Skeltah and Originoo Gunn Clappaz between 1992 and 1999. It was released on March 14, 2000, via Priority Records. Production was handled by Da Beatminerz, BJ Swan, Black Market, Cuzin Bawb, E-Swift, Mark "Boogie" Brown, Self and Starang Wondah, with Buckshot and Drew "Dru-Ha" Friedman serving as executive producers.

The album features three songs from Black Moon's Enta da Stage, two songs from Smif-N-Wessun's Dah Shinin', two songs from Heltah Skeltah's Nocturnal, one song from O.G.C.'s Da Storm, one song from Boot Camp Clik's For the People, one song from Heltah Skeltah's Magnum Force, one song from Cocoa Brovaz' The Rude Awakening, one song from Black Moon's War Zone, and one song from O.G.C.'s The M-Pire Shrikez Back.

== Track listing ==
No.	Title	Writer(s)	Producer(s)	Length
1.	"Who Got Da Props?" (performed by Black Moon, originally from Enta da Stage)	Kenyatta Blake; Ewart Dewgarde	DJ Evil Dee	4:30
2.	"How Many Emcee's" (performed by Black Moon, originally from Enta da Stage)	Blake; E. Dewgarde; Walter Dewgarde	Da Beatminerz	3:40
3.	"I Got Cha Opin (Remix)" (performed by Black Moon, originally from Enta da Stage)	Blake; E. Dewgarde; W. Dewgarde	Da Beatminerz	4:26
4.	"Sound Bway Bureill" (performed by Smif-N-Wessun, originally from Dah Shinin')	Dashawn Yates; Tekomin Williams; Darrell Yates Jr.; Jack McNair; E. Dewgarde; W. Dewgarde	Da Beatminerz	4:20
5.	"Bucktown" (performed by Smif-N-Wessun, originally from Dah Shinin')	Yates Jr.; Williams; E. Dewgarde	Da Beatminerz	4:09
6.	"Leflaur Leflah Eshkoshka" (performed by The Fab 5, originally from Nocturnal)	McNair; Jahmal Bush; Yates; Sean Price; Barret Powell; Paul Hendricks; Tyrone Brown	Baby Paul	5:03
7.	"No Fear" (performed by O.G.C., originally from Da Storm)	McNair; Powell; Yates; W. Dewgarde	Mr. Walt	4:11
8.	"Operation Lockdown" (performed by Heltah Skeltah, originally from Nocturnal)	Bush; Price; Eric Brooks	E-Swift	4:25
9.	"Headz Are Reddee, Pt. 2" (performed by Boot Camp Clik, originally from For the People)	Powell; Williams; Yates Jr.; Bush; McNair; Yates; Price; Blake; Derwin Benoit	BJ Swan; Mark "Boogie" Brown	5:01
10.	"I Ain't Havin' That" (performed by Heltah Skeltah featuring Starang Wondah & Doc Holiday, originally from Magnum Force)	Bush; Price; McNair; Ronnie Duren; Robert E. Clark Jr.; Ali Shaheed Muhammad; Jonathan Davis; Malik Taylor; Erick Sermon; Reginald Noble	Starang Wondah; Cuzin Bawb	5:05
11.	"Black Trump" (performed by Cocoa Brovaz featuring Raekwon, originally from The Rude Awakening)	Yates Jr.; Corey Woods; Williams; Edward Hinson	Self	4:25
12.	"Two Turntables and a Mic" (performed by Black Moon, originally from War Zone)	Blake; E. Dewgarde; Kenton Nix	Da Beatminerz	3:58
13.	"Bounce to the Ounce" (performed by O.G.C., originally from The M-Pire Shrikez Back)	Yates; Powell; McNair; Dwayne Searcy; Robert McDowell; Vince Phillips	Black Market	4:49
Total length:				58:02

Sample credits

- Track 2 contains a sample of "Hydra" performed by Grover Washington Jr. and "My Philosophy" by KRS-One
- Track 3 contains a sample of "Playing Your Game, Baby" performed by Barry White
- Track 6 contains an interpolation of "Uzuri"
- Track 10 contains a sample from "Hot Sex" performed by A Tribe Called Quest and "Pick It Up" performed by Redman
- Track 12 contains a sample from "Heartbeat"

== Personnel ==
- Kenyatta "Buckshot" Blake – vocals (tracks: 1–3, 8, 9, 12), executive producer
- Jack "Starang Wondah" McNair – vocals (tracks: 4, 6, 7, 9, 10, 13), producer (track 10)
- Dashawn "Top Dog" Yates – vocals (tracks: 4, 6, 7, 9, 13)
- Darrell "Steele" Yates Jr. – vocals (tracks: 4, 5, 9, 11)
- Tekomin "Tek" Williams – vocals (tracks: 4, 5, 9, 11)
- Barret "Louieville Sluggah" Powell – vocals (tracks: 6, 7, 9, 13)
- Jahmal "Rock" Bush – vocals (tracks: 6, 8–10)
- Sean "Ruck" Price – vocals (tracks: 6, 8–10)
- Ronnie "Doc Holiday" Duren – vocals (track 10)
- Corey "Raekwon" Woods – vocals (track 11)
- Ewart "DJ Evil Dee" Dewgarde – producer (tracks: 1–5, 12)
- Walter "Mr. Walt" Dewgarde – producer (tracks: 2–4, 7)
- Paul "Baby Paul" Hendricks – producer (track 6)
- Eric "E-Swift" Brooks – producer (track 8)
- Derwin "BJ Swan" Benoit – producer (track 9)
- Mark "Boogie" Brown – producer (track 9)
- Robert "Cuzin Bob" Clark – producer (track 10)
- Edward "Self" Hinson – producer (track 11)
- Dwayne "Emperor" Searcy – producer (track 12)
- Robert "Rob" McDowell – producer (track 12)
- Drew "Dru-Ha" Friedman – executive producer

== Charts ==
Chart (2000)	Peak position
US Top R&B/Hip-Hop Albums (Billboard)	88
