= I Got Cha Opin =

1993 song by Black Moon

Single by Black Moon

from the album Enta da Stage
- B-side: "Reality (Killing Every...)"
- Released: March 28, 1994
- Studio: D&D Studios
- Genre: Hip hop
- Length: 4:15
- Label: Nervous
- Songwriter(s): Kenyatta Blake; Ewart Dewgarde; Walter Dewgarde
- Producer(s): Da Beatminerz

Black Moon singles chronology
"How Many MC's..." (1993)	"I Got Cha Opin" (1994)	"Buck Em Down" (1994)

Music video
- "I Got Cha Opin (Remix)" on YouTube

"I Got Cha Opin" is a song by American hip hop group Black Moon from their debut studio album, Enta da Stage (1993). It was produced by Da Beatminerz. A remix of the song featuring a sample of "Playing Your Game Baby" by Barry White as well as a new chorus and all-new verses was released on March 28, 1994 by Nervous Records, as the third single from the album.

American rapper Eminem remade the original "I Got Cha Opin" in his song "Don't Front", which was released as a bonus track from his album The Marshall Mathers LP 2 (2013).

== Critical reception ==
"I Got Cha Opin" has been described as different in style from Black Moon's "Who Got da Props", with a "raspier tone, a more intricate flow and cadence, and a serious presence that was just as threatening as the temperamental MC on the earlier songs." Cheo Hodari Coker of The Source commented the song "keep[s] things moving quite nicely."

== Charts ==
=== Weekly charts ===
Chart (1994)	Peak position
US Billboard Hot 100	93
US Dance Singles Sales (Billboard)	4
US Hot R&B/Hip-Hop Songs (Billboard)	55

=== Year-end charts ===
Chart (1994)	Position
US Maxi-Singles Sales (Billboard)	49
