= Bucktown (song) =

1994 single by Smif-N-Wessun

Single by Smif-N-Wessun

from the album Dah Shinin'
- B-side: "Let's Git It On"
- Released: May 28, 1994
- Studio: D&D Studios (New York, NY)
- Genre: Hip hop
- Length: 4:08
- Label: Wreck; Nervous
- Songwriters: Darrell A. Yates Jr.; Tekomin B. Williams; Ewart C. Dewgarde
- Producers: Drew "Dru-Ha" Friedman (exec.); Mr. Walt (also exec.); DJ Evil Dee

Smif-N-Wessun singles chronology
"Bucktown" (1994)	"Wontime" (1995)

Music video
- "Bucktown" on YouTube

"Bucktown" is a song by American hip hop duo Smif-N-Wessun from their debut studio album, Dah Shinin' (1994). It was released in 1994 via Wreck/Nervous Records as the lead single from the album. Recording sessions took place at D&D Studios in New York. Production was handled by DJ Evil Dee and Mr. Walt, containing a sample from Jack Bruce's version of "Born to be Blue". The single peaked at number 93 on the US Billboard Hot 100.

== Track listing ==
No.	Title	Writer(s)	Length
1.	"Bucktown" (Vocal)	Darrell A. Yates Jr.; Tekomin B. Williams; Ewart C. Dewgarde	4:13
2.	"Bucktown" (Instrumental)		4:13
3.	"Let's Git It On" (Vocal)	Yates Jr.; Williams; E. Dewgarde; Walter V. Dewgarde	3:46
4.	"Let's Git It On" (Instrumental)		3:47

== Personnel ==
- Darrell A. Yates Jr. – main artist, vocals
- Tekomin B. Williams – main artist, vocals
- Ewart C. Dewgarde – producer, mixing
- Walter V. Dewgarde – producer, mixing, executive producer
- Drew "Dru-Ha" Friedman – executive producer
- Kieran Mayo – engineering
- Leo "Swift" Morris – engineering

== Charts ==
=== Weekly charts ===
Chart (1994)	Peak position
US Billboard Hot 100	93
US Dance Singles Sales (Billboard)	1
US Hot R&B/Hip-Hop Songs (Billboard)	61
US Hot Rap Songs (Billboard)	14

=== Year-end charts ===
Chart (1994)	Position
US Maxi-Singles Sales (Billboard)	6
