= How Many MC's... =

1993 single by Black Moon

Single by Black Moon

from the album Enta da Stage
- B-side: "Act Like U Want It"
- Released: June 9, 1993
- Studio: D&D Studios
- Genre: Hip hop
- Length: 3:40
- Label: Nervous
- Songwriters: Kenyatta Blake; Ewart Dewgarde; Walter Dewgarde; Grover Washington Jr.
- Producer: Da Beatminerz

Black Moon singles chronology
"Who Got da Props" (1992)	"How Many MC's..." (1993)	"I Got Cha Opin" (1994)

Music video
- "How Many MC's..." on YouTube

"How Many MC's..." (also titled "How Many Emcee's (Must Get Dissed)") is a song by American hip hop group Black Moon, released on June 9, 1993 as the second single from their debut studio album, Enta da Stage (1993). Produced by Da Beatminerz, it samples "Hydra" by Grover Washington Jr., "Collage for Polly" by Joe Farrell and a line from "My Philosophy" by Boogie Down Productions: "How many MC's must get dissed?"

== Composition and critical reception ==
Vincent Thomas of AllMusic considered the song a "total departure from the vibe present on 'Who Got da Props'" and called it a "subtly horrific track over which Buckshot premiered a more deliberate flow that bespoke controlled menace." Cheo Hodari Coker of The Source commented the song "bring[s] things to a thunderous close, leaving the listener thirsting for more."

== Charts ==
Chart (1993)	Peak position
US Bubbling Under Hot 100 Singles (Billboard)	20
US Hot R&B/Hip-Hop Songs (Billboard)	97
US Maxi-Singles Sales (Billboard)	17
