= Buck Em Down =

1993 song by Black Moon

Single by Black Moon

from the album Enta da Stage
- B-side: "Murder MC's"
- Released: November 7, 1994
- Studio: D&D Studios
- Genre: Hip hop
- Length: 4:39
- Label: Nervous
- Songwriter(s): Kenyatta Blake; Ewart Dewgarde; Larry Mizell
- Producer(s): Da Beatminerz

Black Moon singles chronology
"I Got Cha Opin" (1994)	"Buck Em Down" (1994)	"Headz Ain't Redee" (1995)

Music video
- "Buck Em Down" on YouTube

"Buck Em Down" is a song by American hip hop group Black Moon and the fourth single from their debut studio album, Enta da Stage (1993). Produced by Da Beatminerz, it contains samples of "Wind Parade" by Donald Byrd and "Hihache" by Lafayette Afro Rock Band. The song was released with a music video featuring the remixed version. Both original and remixed versions featured sampled portions from "Wind Parade" and similar lyrics, with the remix featuring a different vocal delivery and edited lyrics.

== Composition ==
Vincent Thomas of AllMusic noted the song as among the tracks from Enta da Stage that "embody early-'90s N.Y.C. hip-hop", as it consists of "rough rhymes" and a chorus of "rowdy b-boys shouting in unison."

== Charts ==
=== Weekly charts ===
Chart (1994)	Peak position
US Bubbling Under Hot 100 Singles (Billboard)	24
US Hot R&B/Hip-Hop Songs (Billboard)	81

=== Year-end charts ===
Chart (1994)	Position
US Maxi-Singles Sales (Billboard)	27
