= Brace 4 Impak =

Studio album by Da Beatminerz
- Released: July 31, 2001
- Studio: Abandon Building (New York, NY); D&D Studios (New York, NY); Fast Forward Studios (New York, NY); Playpen Recordings (New York, NY); Soundtrack (New York, NY); The Dewgarde Crib Of Hits (New York, NY); The Grinder (Los Angeles, CA)
- Genre: Hip-hop
- Length: 67:40
- Label: Rawkus
- Producer: Da Beatminerz

Da Beatminerz chronology
Brace 4 Impak (2001)	Fully Loaded w/ Statik (2004)

Professional ratings
Review scores
Source	Rating
AllMusic	3/5 stars
The A.V. Club	(mixed)
Exclaim!	(mixed)
HipHopDX	4.5/5 stars
NME	7/10 stars
Stylus Magazine	(C+)

Brace 4 Impak is the debut studio album by American hip-hop production team Da Beatminerz. It was released in 2001 via Rawkus Records, and was produced entirely by Da Beatminerz. The album featured guest appearances from Apani B, Black Moon, Blackhearted Skavangerz, Caron Wheeler, Smif-N-Wessun, Cordell, Diamond D, Flipmode Squad, Freddie Foxxx, Heather B. Gardner, Jayo Felony, Jean Grae, Krumbsnatcha, Lord Tariq, Naughty by Nature, Pete Rock, Ras Kass, Royce da 5'9", Shadez Of Brooklyn, Talib Kweli, Tefelar, The Last Emperor, Total, and Vinia Mojica.

The album peaked at number 143 on the Billboard 200, number 38 on the Top R&B/Hip-Hop Albums, and number 2 on the Heatseekers Albums. Its lead single, "Take That", peaked at #67 on the Hot R&B/Hip-Hop Songs and #4 on the Hot Rap Songs.

== Track listing ==
No.	Title	Producer(s)	Length
1.	"Intro / Live & Direct / Brace 4 Impak" (featuring Lord Tariq and Royce da 5'9")	Mr. Walt	3:05
2.	"Devastatin' .... That's Us!" (featuring Black Moon and Lord Have Mercy)	Mr. Walt	5:13
3.	"Hell Yeah, Oh Yeah!" (featuring Shadez of Brooklyn)	Rich Blak	3:44
4.	"Hustler's Theme" (featuring The Last Emperor)	Mr. Walt	3:44
5.	"Bentleys & Bitches" (featuring Jayo Felony and Ras Kass)	DJ Evil Dee	3:17
6.	"Best at That" (featuring Diamond D)	DJ Evil Dee; Mr. Walt	3:23
7.	"Extreme Situation" (featuring Blackheart Scavangers and Smif-N-Wessun)	DJ Evil Dee; Mr. Walt	4:06
8.	"Open" (featuring Pete Rock and Caron Wheeler)	Mr. Walt	5:36
9.	"Take That" (featuring Flipmode Squad and Vinia Mojica)	Mr. Walt	3:22
10.	"Drama" (featuring Shadez of Brooklyn)	Chocolate Tye	5:55
11.	"The Anti-Love Movement" (featuring Talib Kweli and Total)	DJ Evil Dee; Mr. Walt	5:09
12.	"How We Ride" (featuring Freddie Foxxx and Heather B.)	DJ Evil Dee	2:38
13.	"Shut da Fuck Up!" (featuring Apani B. Fly and Jean Grae)	DJ Evil Dee	4:39
14.	"Thug Love" (featuring Naughty by Nature)	Baby Paul; Mr. Walt	4:32
15.	"Let's Talk About It (T.R.O.Y. Remix)" (featuring Krumbsnatcha)	Mr. Walt	4:55
16.	"Ghetto 2 Ghetto" (featuring Cordell and Tefelar)	Baby Paul	3:12
Total length:			1:07:31
