= Diggin' in dah Vaults =

Compilation album by Black Moon
- Released: October 29, 1996
- Recorded: 1992–1995
- Genre: East Coast hip hop; hardcore hip hop
- Length: 56:04
- Label: Nervous Records
- Producer: Buckshot (exec.); Big Dru Ha (exec.); Mike Weiss (exec.); Da Beatminerz

Black Moon chronology
Enta da Stage (1993)	Diggin' in dah Vaults (1996)	War Zone (1999)

Professional ratings
Review scores
Source	Rating
Allmusic	link
Muzik	4.5/5 stars

Diggin' in dah Vaults is a compilation album by American hip hop group Black Moon. The album features seven remixes of tracks originally released on their debut Enta da Stage, and a few songs originally released as B-Sides on past singles. The track "Headz Ain't Redee" was originally featured on the Gold-certified soundtrack to New Jersey Drive. The album was not authorized by the group, Nervous Records (US) bootlegged it after Black Moon refused to submit a new album and went to court with the record label.

== Track listing ==
#	Title	Producer(s)	Performer (s)
1	"How Many Emcees [Must Get Dissed]" [DJ Evil Dee remix]	DJ Evil Dee of Da Beatminerz	Buckshot
2	"Act Like U Want It" [DJ Evil Dee remix]	DJ Evil Dee of Da Beatminerz	Buckshot, 5ft
3	"Shit Iz Real" [new vocals by Buckshot]	DJ Evil Dee of Da Beatminerz	Buckshot
4	"Son Get Wrec" [DJ Evil Dee remix]	DJ Evil Dee of Da Beatminerz	5ft
5	"U da Man" [DJ Evil Dee remix]	DJ Evil Dee of Da Beatminerz	5ft, Dru-Ha, Havoc, Smif-n-Wessun, Buckshot
6	"Buckshot's Freestyle Joint"	Da Beatminerz	Buckshot, 5ft
7	"Fuck It Up"	Da Beatminerz	Buckshot
8	"I Got Cha Opin" [remix]	Da Beatminerz	Buckshot
9	"Buck Em Down" [remix]	DJ Evil Dee of Da Beatminerz	Buckshot
10	"Murder MC's"	Da Beatminerz	Buckshot
11	"Headz Ain't Redee"	Da Beatminerz	Boot Camp Clik
12	"Six Feet Deep"	Da Beatminerz	Buckshot

== Charts ==
=== Weekly charts ===
Chart (1996–1997)	Peak position
US Top R&B/Hip-Hop Albums (Billboard)	33
US Heatseekers Albums (Billboard)	22

== Singles-chart positions ==
Year	Song	Chart positions			
Year	Song	Billboard Hot 100	Hot R&B/Hip-Hop Singles & Tracks	Hot Rap Singles	Hot Dance Music/Maxi-Singles Sales
1994	"Buck Em Down" [remix]	-	#81	#17	#2
1994	"I Got Cha Opin" [remix]	#93	#55	#15	#4
1995	"Headz Ain't Redee"	-	-	-	#14
1996	"How Many Emcees [Must Get Dissed]" [DJ Evil Dee remix]	-	-	#32	#41
