= War Zone (album) =

Studio album by Black Moon
- Released: February 23, 1999
- Recorded: 1997–1998
- Studio: D&D (New York City)
- Genre: East Coast hip-hop; underground hip-hop
- Length: 1:01:12
- Label: Duck Down; Priority
- Producer: Buckshot (exec.); Drew "Dru-Ha" Friedman (exec.); Da Beatminerz (also exec.); Rockwilder (co.)

Black Moon chronology
Diggin' in Dah Vaults (1996)	War Zone (1999)	Total Eclipse (2003)

Singles from War Zone
- 1. "Two Turntables & A Mic" Released: 1999; 2. "Worldwind (Remix)" Released: June 29, 1999

Professional ratings
Review scores
Source	Rating
AllMusic	4/5 stars
Los Angeles Times	3/4 stars
RapReviews	7/10
Rolling Stone	3.5/5 stars
The Source	4/5 stars

War Zone is the second album by American hip-hop trio Black Moon. It was released on February 23, 1999, through Duck Down/Priority Records. Recording sessions took place at D&D Studios in New York City. Production was entirely handled by Da Beatminerz, who also served as executive producers together with Drew "Dru-Ha" Friedman and member Buckshot. It features guest appearances from Busta Rhymes, Heather B., Louieville Sluggah, M.O.P., Q-Tip, Rock, Smif-N-Wessun and Teflon. The album peaked at number 35 on the Billboard 200 and number 9 on the Top R&B Albums. It was supported by two singles: "Two Turntables & a Mic" and "Worldwind (This Is What It Sounds Like) (Remix)".

The album was released almost six years after its influential debut Enta da Stage. The group began a lengthy legal battle with Nervous Records in 1995 over the licensing of their name, which finally settled soon before the release of War Zone. Though many of the albums released from the Boot Camp Clik family between 1997 and 1999 received mediocre reviews, War Zone garnered some strong acclaim and moderate sales. Member 5ft, who only appeared on three tracks on Enta da Stage, provides verses on six songs.

== Track listing ==
No.	Title	Writer(s)	Length
1.	"Intro"	Kenyatta Blake	0:43
2.	"The Onslaught" (featuring Busta Rhymes)	Blake; Ewart C. Dewgrade; George Clinton; Bernie Worrell; William Collins	3:53
3.	"War Zone"	Blake; Kasim Reid; Walter V. Dewgarde; Jahmal Bush	3:21
4.	"This Is What It Sounds Like (Worldwind)"	Blake; Paul Anthony Hendricks; Brian Corrigan; Manos Hadjidakis	4:39
5.	"Freestyle"	Blake; W. Dewgarde; Claydes Charles Smith; Fred Wesley; James Brown; Kool & the Gang	3:36
6.	"Five" (Interlude)	Reid	1:13
7.	"For All Y'all" (featuring Heather B.)	Reid; Heather B. Gardner; E. Dewgarde	4:40
8.	"Come Get Some" (featuring Louieville Sluggah)	Blake; Barret Powell; W. Dewgarde; Thomas Sylvester Allen	5:00
9.	"Weight of the World"	Blake; Reid; E. Dewgarde; W. Dewgarde	3:29
10.	"Evil Dee Is on the Mix"	E. Dewgarde	0:59
11.	"Show Down" (featuring Q-Tip)	Blake; E. Dewgarde; W. Dewgarde	3:41
12.	"One-Two"	Blake; Reid; E. Dewgarde; David Axelrod	3:43
13.	"Frame" (featuring Cocoa Brovaz)	Blake; Darrell Yates, Jr.; Tekomin Williams; W. Dewgarde	3:59
14.	"Buckshot (Interlude)"	Blake	1:11
15.	"Two Turntables & A Mic"	Blake; E. Dewgarde; Kenton Nix	3:56
16.	"Annihilation" (featuring M.O.P. and Teflon)	Reid; Eric Murray; Jamal Grinnage; Linwood Starling; Hendricks; W. Dewgarde	4:08
17.	"Duress"	Blake; Hendricks; Axelrod	4:00
18.	"Throw Your Hands in the Air"	Blake; E. Dewgarde; W. Dewgarde; Dana Stinson; Curtis Mayfield	4:19
19.	"Outro" (featuring Rock)	Bush	0:42
Total length:			1:01:12

War Zone Revisited
No.	Title	Writer(s)	Length
20.	"The Streets"	Blake; E. Dewgarde; W. Dewgarde	3:09
21.	"Just Us"	Blake; E. Dewgarde; W. Dewgarde	5:37
Total length:			1:09:59

Sample credits

- Track 2 contains a sample from "How Do Yeaw View You?" written by George Clinton, William Collins and Bernard Worrell
- Track 4 contains a sample from "The Day" written by Manos Hadjidakis and Brian Corrigan
- Track 5 contains a sample from "N.T." written by Kool & the Gang and "Dead On It Part II" written by James Brown and Fred Wesley
- Track 12 contains a sample from "A Divine Image" written by David Axelrod
- Track 15 contains a sample from "Heartbeat" written by Kenton Nix
- Track 17 contains a sample from "General Confessional" written by Danvid Axelrod
- Track 18 contains a sample from "We People Who Are Darker Than Blue" written by Curtis Mayfield

== Personnel ==
Black Moon

- Kenyatta "Buckshot" Blake – main artist, lead vocals, executive producer, liner notes
- Kaseem "5ft" Reid – main artist, vocals (tracks: 3, 6, 7, 9, 12, 16), liner notes
- Ewart "DJ Evil Dee" Dewgrade – main artist, scratches, producer, executive producer, liner notes

Guest musicians

- Trevor "Busta Rhymes" Smith – featured artist (track 2)
- Heather B. Gardner – featured artist (track 7)
- Barret "Louieville Sluggah" Powell – featured artist (track 8)
- Jonathan "Q-Tip" Davis – featured artist (track 11)
- Darrell "Steele" Yates, Jr. – featured artist (track 13)
- Tekomin "Tek" Williams – featured artist (track 13)
- Jamal "Lil' Fame" Grinnage – featured artist (track 16)
- Eric "Billy Danze" Murray – featured artist (track 16)
- Linwood "Teflon" Starling – featured artist (track 16)
- Jahmal "Rock" Bush – featured artist (track 19)
- Mark "Boogie" Brown – bass (track 5), guitar (track 8)
- Dana "Rockwilder" Stinson – keyboards & co-producer (track 18)

Technical

- Walter "Mr. Walt" Dewgarde – producer, executive producer, liner notes
- Paul "Baby Paul" Hendricks – producer
- Drew "Dru-Ha" Friedman – executive producer
- Kieran Walsh – mixing (tracks: 2, 3, 5, 7, 8, 11, 13, 16–18), recording (tracks: 2, 7, 17, 18)
- Leo "Swift" Morris – mixing (tracks: 4, 5, 9, 11, 12, 15, 16), recording (tracks: 4, 8, 9, 11–13, 15)
- Dejuana Richardson – recording (tracks: 3, 5)
- Almitra – recording (tracks: 6, 14)
- Cynical Smith – recording (tracks: 6, 14)
- Donovan McCoy – recording (track 16)
- Thomas Coyne – mastering
- Kevin Bergen – assistant engineering
- Tramp And Huy – art direction

== Charts ==
Chart (1999)	Peak position
US Billboard 200	35
US Top R&B Albums (Billboard)	9

=== Singles chart positions ===
Year	Song	Chart positions	
Year	Song	US R&B/Hip-Hop	US Rap
1999	"Two Turntables & a Mic"	82	–
1999	"This Is What It Sounds Like (Worldwind)" (Remix)	–	13
