= Respect All Fear None =

Studio album by Krumbsnatcha
- Released: October 8, 2002
- Genre: East Coast hip hop • hardcore hip hop
- Length: 51:41
- Label: D&D
- Producer: Curt Cazal; Da Beatminerz; Eric Wes; Nottz; Omen; Easy Mo Bee; the Alchemist; Arabian Knight; DJ Premier

Krumbsnatcha chronology
Long Awaited: Snatcha Season Pt. 2 (2001)	Respect All Fear None (2002)	Let the Truth Be Told (2004)

Professional ratings
Review scores
Source	Rating
RapReviews	7.5/10 stars

Respect All Fear None is the third studio album by American rapper and Gang Starr Foundation member Krumbsnatcha. It was released on October 8, 2002, on D&D Records making it his first and only album on the label. The album's audio production was handled by the Alchemist, Arabian Knight, Curt Cazal, Da Beatminerz, DJ Premier, Easy Mo Bee, Eric Wes, Nottz, and Omen with executive production provided by D&D Records' founders David Lotwin and Douglas Grama. Boogieman, Buckshot, Craig G, Demorne Warren, Gang Starr, Jahdan Blakkamoore, Jaysaun, Kenyatta "Sharu" Jackson, and Mexicana made their guest appearances on the album. It peaked at number 65 on the Top R&B/Hip-Hop Albums and number 38 on the Independent Albums. The album spawned three singles: "Oxygen"/"Strike Back (Closer To God Pt. II)", "Incredible"/"Streets Is Calling", and "Rich Man Poor Man"/"King Of All Kings", but none of them had reached music charts.

== Track listing ==
No.	Title	Producer(s)	Length
1.	"Intro"	Eric Wes	1:32
2.	"What's Life"	Easy Mo Bee	4:05
3.	"Words from the General"		1:12
4.	"Incredible" (featuring Gang Starr)	DJ Premier	3:42
5.	"Strike Back (Closer to God Pt. II)" (featuring Demorne Warren)	Da Beatminerz	3:28
6.	"Prison Life"	Curt Cazal	4:23
7.	"Nobody Move" (featuring Buckshot and Craig G)	Curt Cazal	4:04
8.	"Streets Is Calling" (featuring Mexicana)	The Alchemist	4:04
9.	"Oxygen" (featuring Boogieman)	Nottz	4:57
10.	"House Party"	Omen	4:31
11.	"Get Down" (featuring Jaysaun)	Arabian Knight	3:48
12.	"King of All Kings" (featuring Jahdan Blakkamoore)	Eric Wes	4:17
13.	"Headqcourterz"		0:27
14.	"Rich Man Poor Man"	Da Beatminerz	4:42
15.	"D&D Radio" (featuring Kenyatta "Sharu" Jackson)		2:29
Total length:			51:41

== Personnel ==
- Demetrius Lamont Gibbs – main artist
- Keith Edward Elam – guest artist (track 4), associate executive producer
- Demorne Warren – guest artist (track 5)
- Kenyatta Blake – guest artist (track 7)
- Craig Curry – guest artist (track 7)
- Jason Rosenwald – guest artist (track 11)
- Wayne Sharne Henry – guest artist (track 12)
- Kenyatta "Sharu" Jackson – hoster/interviewer (track 15)
- Mexicana – guest artist (track 8)
- Boogieman – guest artist (track 9)
- Eric Wes – producer (tracks: 1, 12)
- Osten Harvey Jr. – producer (track 2)
- Christopher Edward Martin – producer (track 4)
- Da Beatminerz – producers (tracks: 5, 14)
- Curtis Andre Small – producer (tracks: 6, 7)
- Daniel Alan Maman – producer (track 8)
- Dominick J. Lamb – producer (track 9)
- Sidney "Omen" Brown – producer (track 10)
- Suleyman Ansari – producer (track 11)
- David Lotwin – executive producer
- Doug Grama – executive producer
- Kieran Walsh – mixing (tracks: 2, 5–12, 14), engineering
- Eddie Sancho – mixing (track 4)
- Dejuana Richardson – engineering
- Dexter Thibou – engineering
- Eric Steinen – engineering
- Tony Dawsey – mastering
- Atsuko Tanaka – photography

== Charts ==
Chart (2002)	Peak position
US Top R&B/Hip-Hop Albums (Billboard)	65
US Independent Albums (Billboard)	38
