= Rise of da Moon =

Studio album by Black Moon
- Released: October 18, 2019
- Genre: Hip-hop
- Length: 52:34
- Label: Duck Down Music
- Producer: Black Moon (exec.); Drew "Dru-Ha" Friedman (exec.); Da Beatminerz

Black Moon chronology
| Total Eclipse (2003) | Rise of da Moon (2019) |

Singles from Rise of da Moon
- 1. "Creep Wit Me" Released: June 14, 2019

Professional ratings
Review scores
| Source | Rating |
|---|---|
| HipHopDX | 3.9/5 |

Rise of da Moon is the fourth studio album by American hip-hop group Black Moon. It was released on October 18, 2019, via Duck Down Music. Produced entirely by Da Beatminerz, it features guest appearances from Smif-N-Wessun, Method Man and Rock.

The album was preceded by the only single, "Creep Wit Me", which was released on June 14, 2019 with an accompanying music video, as well as the music video for "Black Moon Rise", which was released on September 20, 2019.

== Track listing ==
| No. | Title | Writer(s) | Length |
|---|---|---|---|
| 1. | "Creep Wit Me" | Kenyatta Blake; Kasim Reid; Ewart Dewgarde | 4:43 |
| 2. | "Da Don Flow" | Blake; Reid; Dewgarde | 3:25 |
| 3. | "Ahaaaa" | Blake; Reid; Dewgarde | 3:02 |
| 4. | "Pop Off" | Blake; Reid; Dewgarde | 2:43 |
| 5. | "Ease Back" (featuring Method Man and General Steele) | Blake; Reid; Clifford Smith; Darrell Yates, Jr.; Dewgarde | 3:59 |
| 6. | "Impossible" (featuring Smif-N-Wessun) | Blake; Reid; Tekomin Williams; Yates, Jr.; Dewgarde | 4:43 |
| 7. | "Black Moon Rise" | Blake; Reid; Dewgarde | 3:59 |
| 8. | "Children of the Night" (featuring Rockness Monsta) | Blake; Reid; Jahmal Bush; Dewgarde | 4:23 |
| 9. | "Glory" | Blake; Reid; Dewgarde | 3:13 |
| 10. | "General Feva" | Blake; Reid; Dewgarde | 2:36 |
| 11. | "Look at Them" | Blake; Reid; Dewgarde | 3:33 |
| 12. | "At Night" | Blake; Reid; Dewgarde | 3:21 |
| 13. | "Pay Back" | Blake; Reid; Dewgarde | 2:47 |
| 14. | "Roll Wit Me" (featuring Tek) | Blake; Reid; Williams; Dewgarde | 3:12 |
| 15. | "Time Flys" | Blake; Reid; Dewgarde | 2:55 |
| Total length: | | | 52:34 |

== Personnel ==
- Kenyatta "Buckshot" Blake – main artist, executive producer
- Kasim "5ft" Reid – main artist, executive producer
- Ewart "DJ Evil Dee" Dewgarde – main artist, producer, executive producer
- Darrell "Steele" Yates Jr. – featured artist (tracks: 5, 6)
- Clifford "Method Man" Smith – featured artist (track 5)
- Tekomin "Tek" Williams – featured artist (tracks: 6, 14)
- Jahmal "Rock" Bush – featured artist (track 8)
- Drew "Dru-Ha" Friedman – executive producer
- Rob "Giambi" Garcia – recording
- Dan "The Man" Humiston – recording
- Tommy "Jake Palumbo" Vick – mixing, mastering
- Robert Adam Mayer – photography
