= The Rude Awakening =

Studio album by Cocoa Brovaz
- Released: March 31, 1998
- Recorded: 1997–98
- Studio: D&D (New York City); Trophsphere (New Jersey); Streetlight (New York City); Unique Studios (New York City)
- Genre: Hip hop
- Length: 1:06:23
- Label: Duck Down; Priority
- Producer: Buckshot (exec.); Drew "Dru-Ha" Friedman (exec.); Tek (exec.); Steele (also exec.); Baby Paul; Face N Triple Beam; Filthy Rich; JB; Keylord; Mr. Walt; Sean Cane; Self; Shaleek; Shawn J Period; Sir Gav; Suite 1200

Cocoa Brovaz chronology
Dah Shinin' (1995)	The Rude Awakening (1998)	Smif 'n' Wessun: Reloaded (2005)

Singles from The Rude Awakening
- 1. "Won on Won" Released: 1997; 2. "Bucktown USA" Released: 1998; 3. "Black Trump" Released: 1998

Professional ratings
Review scores
Source	Rating
AllMusic	3/5 stars
RapReviews	7/10

The Rude Awakening is the second studio album by American hip hop duo Smif-N-Wessun. It was released on March 31, 1998, via Priority Records under the name Cocoa Brovaz. The duo was forced to drop their original name after they were sued by the Smith & Wesson firearms company. Production was handled by several record producers, including Da Beatminerz, Sean C, Self, Shaleek, Shawn J Period and member Steele.

The album peaked at number 21 on the Billboard 200 and number 3 on the Top R&B/Hip-Hop Albums. The lead single from the album was "Black Trump", which features Raekwon of the Wu-Tang Clan. Their 1997 single "Won On Won" from the Soul in the Hole soundtrack is included here, as well as the singles "Spanish Harlem" and "Bucktown USA".

== Track listing ==
No.	Title	Writer(s)	Producer(s)	Length
1.	"Off the Wall" (featuring Professor X and Jahdan Blakkamoore)	Tekomin B. Williams; Darrell A. Yates Jr.; Robert Carson; Shawn M. Jones	Shawn J. Period	5:13
2.	"Still Standin Strong"	Williams; Yates Jr.; J. Smith; Triple Beam	Steele; Face N Triple Beam	4:00
3.	"Won on Won"	Williams; Yates Jr.; Deleno Matthews; Carlton Ridenhour; Hank Shocklee	Sean Cane	3:57
4.	"Live at the Garden" (Skit)			0:40
5.	"Blown Away" (featuring Buckshot)	Yates Jr.; Williams; Kenyatta Blake; Paul Hendricks	Baby Paul; Steele	4:22
6.	"Money Talks"			0:49
7.	"The Cash"	Yates Jr.; Williams; Richard Ahee	Filthy Rich	3:57
8.	"Black Trump" (featuring Raekwon)	Yates Jr.; Williams; Corey Woods; Desmond Wray; Edward Hinson	Lord Self	4:24
9.	"Dry Snitch" (featuring Smack Man and Head Arabic)	Williams; Yates Jr.; Thad Williams; T. French; Kenneth Furs	Suite 1200	4:30
10.	"Game of Life" (featuring F.L.O.W.)	Williams; Yates Jr.; Furs	Suite 1200; Steele	5:47
11.	"Back 2 Life"	Williams; Yates Jr.; Jeff Brown	Jeff "JB" Brown	3:51
12.	"Bucktown USA"	Williams; Yates Jr.; Walter V. Dewgarde	Mr. Walt	4:00
13.	"What They Call Him (Skit)" (featuring Big Ol Pimp Cook)	W.T. White		1:00
14.	"Hold It Down" (featuring Storm)	Williams; Yates Jr.; Greg Johnson; Wray; Hinson	Sir Gav; Keyloard; Self (co.)	4:56
15.	"Spanish Harlem" (featuring Hurricane G and Tony Touch)	Yates Jr.; Williams; Gloria Rodríguez; Joseph Hernandez; Dewgarde	Mr. Walt	4:09
16.	"Myah Angelow" (featuring Sean Price and Deidra Artis)	Williams; Yates Jr.; Sean Price; Deidra Artis; Hendricks	Baby Paul	5:12
17.	"Memorial" (featuring Eek-A-Mouse)	Williams; Yates Jr.; Ripton Hylton; Darryl Pearson	Shaleek	5:36
Total length:				1:06:23

== Music videos ==
- "Won on Won"
  Released: 1997
- "Black Trump"
  Director: G. Thomas
  Released: 1998
- "Spanish Harlem"
  Released: 1998

== Charts ==
Chart (1998)	Peak position
US Billboard 200	21
US Top R&B/Hip-Hop Albums (Billboard)	3

=== Singles chart positions ===
Year	Song	Chart positions		
Year	Song	Billboard Hot 100	Hot R&B/Hip-Hop Singles & Tracks	Hot Rap Singles
1997	"Won on Won"	-	#94	-
1998	"Bucktown USA"	-	-	#47
