= Total Eclipse (Black Moon album) =

Studio album by Black Moon
- Released: October 7, 2003
- Recorded: 2002–03
- Studios: The Dewgarde Crib of Hits (New York, NY); Tha Entaprize; CDR Studios; D.I.R.T. Factory (Norfolk, VA)
- Genres: East Coast hip-hop; hardcore hip-hop; underground hip-hop
- Length: 1:01:34
- Label: Duck Down
- Producers: Buckshot (exec.); Drew "Dru-Ha" Friedman (exec.); Da Beatminerz; Coptic; Dan the Man; DJ Static; Kleph Dollaz; MoSS; Nottz; Oshta Hunter; Tone Capone

Black Moon chronology
War Zone (1999)	Total Eclipse (2003)	Rise of da Moon (2019)

Singles from Total Eclipse
- 1. "Rush" Released: January 7, 2003; 2. "Stay Real" Released: September 19, 2003; 3. "That's How It Iz / Why We Act This Way" Released: 2004

Professional ratings
Review scores
Source	Rating
AllMusic	4/5 stars
laut.de	3/5 stars
Now	3/5 (NNN)
RapReviews	8/10
The Source	3.5/5 stars
XXL	3/5 (L)

Total Eclipse is the third studio album by American hip-hop group Black Moon. It was released on October 7, 2003, through Duck Down Music. Recording sessions took place at the Dewgarde Crib of Hits in New York, at Tha Entaprize, at CDR Studios, and at D.I.R.T. Factory in Norfolk. Production was primarily handled by Da Beatminerz, as well as Dan The Man, Coptic, DJ Static, Kleph Dollaz, MoSS, Nottz, Oshta Hunter and Tone Capone. It features guest appearances from Smif-N-Wessun, Sean Price and Starang Wondah.

Released one year after the Boot Camp Clik's return with The Chosen Few, the album received generally positive reviews from music critics and humble sales, peaking at number 47 on the Top R&B/Hip-Hop Albums and number 23 on the Independent Albums in the US. The album features the singles "Stay Real" and "This Goes Out to You", as well as the bonus track "Rush", a single that was released on January 7, 2003, and included on the Collect Dis Edition compilation.

== Track listing ==
No.	Title	Writer(s)	Producer(s)	Length
1.	"Stay Real"	Kenyatta Blake; Kasim Reid; Ewart Dewgarde; Ray Levin	Da Beatminerz	5:20
2.	"Looking Down the Barrel" (featuring Sean Price)	Blake; Sean Price; Jason Connoy	MoSS	3:57
3.	"The Fever"	Reid; Anthony Gilmour; Dan Humiston	Tone Capone; Dan The Man^{[a]}	1:12
4.	"Confusion"	Blake	DJ Static	4:28
5.	"That'z the Way Shit Iz" (featuring Cocoa Brovaz)	Blake; Walter Dewgarde; A. Green	Da Beatminerz	3:12
6.	"Why We Act This Way" (featuring Starang Wondah)	Blake; Jack McNair; Dominick Lamb	Nottz	4:33
7.	"MC Everybody (Skit)"	Blake	Dan The Man	1:12
8.	"That'z How It Iz"	Blake; Reid; W. Dewgarde	Da Beatminerz	4:17
9.	"Stoned Iz the Way"	Blake; E. Dewgarde	Da Beatminerz	4:21
10.	"Ruck Is Dead (Skit)"	Blake	Da Beatminerz	0:17
11.	"What Would U Do?" (featuring Sean Price)	Blake; Price; W. Dewgarde	Da Beatminerz	3:15
12.	"How We Do It"	Blake; Darrel Durant	Kleph Dollaz	3:44
13.	"Where It Goez Wrong" (featuring Tek)	Blake; Tekomin Williams; E. Dewgarde	Da Beatminerz	4:48
14.	"Pressure Iz Tight"	Blake; Reid; E. Dewgarde	Da Beatminerz; Dan The Man^{[b]}	3:36
15.	"No Way" (featuring Steele)	Blake; Darrell Yates Jr.; E. Dewgarde	Da Beatminerz	3:42
16.	"This Goes Out to You" (featuring Steele)	Blake; Yates Jr.; Eric Matlock; Oshta Hunter	Coptic; Oshta Hunter; Dan The Man^{[b]}	4:41
17.	"Rush"	Blake; W. Dewgarde	Da Beatminerz	4:59
Total length:				1:01:34

Notes

- ^{^[a]} signifies a co-producer
- ^{^[b]} signifies an additional producer
- Track 3 features background vocals by Nadine Michel
- Track 16 features additional vocals by Charon Aldredge

Sample credits

- Track 1 contains a sample of the recording "Seed of Love" as performed by Little Boy Blues

== Personnel ==
- Kenyatta "Buckshot" Blake – main artist, vocals, executive producer
- Kasim "5ft" Reid – main artist, vocals (tracks: 1, 3, 8, 14)
- Ewart "DJ Evil Dee" Dewgarde – main artist, scratches (tracks: 8–10, 14), mixing (track 1), recording (tracks: 1, 8, 9, 11, 13–15, 17), producer
- Sean Price – vocals (tracks: 2, 11)
- Darrell "Steele" Yates Jr. – vocals (tracks: 5, 13)
- Tekomin "Tek" Williams – vocals (tracks: 5, 15, 16)
- Jack "Starang Wondah" McNair – vocals (track 6)
- Nadine Michel – background vocals (track 3)
- Charon Aldredge – additional vocals (track 16)
- Ariel "A-Train" Levine – guitar (track 3)
- DJ Terrell Rockwell – scratches (track 8)
- Da Beatminerz – producers (tracks: 1, 5, 7, 8, 9–11, 13–15, 17), mixing (track 13)
- Jason "MoSS" Connoy – producer (track 2)
- Dan "The Man" Humiston – co-producer (track 3), producer (track 7), additional producer (tracks: 14, 16), recording (tracks: 1, 4, 8, 11, 13–16)
- Anthony "Tone Capone" Gilmour – producer (track 3)
- Sean "DJ Static" Moore – producer (track 4)
- Dominick "Nottz" Lamb – producer (track 6)
- Darrel "Kleph Dollaz" Durant – producer (track 12)
- Eric "Coptic" Matlock – producer (track 16)
- Oshta Hunter – producer (track 16)
- Drew "Dru-Ha" Friedman – executive producer
- Rob "Giambi" Garcia – recording (tracks: 2, 3, 5, 8, 12, 14, 16)
- Chris Brown – recording (tracks: 3, 13, 15, 16)
- Walter "Mr. Walt" Dewgarde – recording (track 5)
- Buttah L – assistant recording (track 17)
- Michael Sarsfield – mastering
- Javad – art direction, photography
- Steve P – art direction
- Akash Khokha – layout
- Brandon Teitel – marketing

== Charts ==
Chart (2003)	Peak position
US Top R&B/Hip-Hop Albums (Billboard)	47
US Independent Albums (Billboard)	23
