= Dah Shinin' =

Studio album by Smif-N-Wessun
- Released: January 10, 1995
- Recorded: 1993–94
- Studio: D&D (New York City)
- Genre: East Coast hip hop; hardcore hip hop
- Length: 1:07:35
- Label: Wreck; Nervous
- Producer: Buckshot (exec.); Drew "Dru-Ha" Friedman (exec.); Da Beatminerz

Smif-N-Wessun chronology
Dah Shinin' (1995)	The Rude Awakening (1998)

Singles from Dah Shinin'
- 1. "Bucktown" Released: May 28, 1994; 2. "Wontime"/"Stand Strong" Released: 1994; 3. "Wrekonize"/"Sound Bwoy Bureill" Released: 1995

Professional ratings
Review scores
Source	Rating
AllMusic	4.5/5 stars
The Source	3/5 stars

Dah Shinin' is the debut studio album by American East Coast hip hop duo Smif-N-Wessun. It was released on January 10, 1995, via Wreck/Nervous Records. Recording sessions took place at D&D Studios in New York City. Production was handled by Da Beatminerz. It features a guest appearance from the Boot Camp Clik. The album peaked at number 59 on the Billboard 200. The production is the signature Beatminerz sound which is elevated from their work on Black Moon's 1993 effort Enta da Stage. The album spawned four singles: "Bucktown"/Let's Git It On", "Wrekonize/Sound Bwoy Burriel", "Wrekonize (Remix)/Sound Bwoy Burriel (edit)" and "Wontime". A track known as 'Nothin' Move but The Money' was left of the release of the album due to sample clearance issues and was released on white label as a result.

== Background ==
Members Tek and Steele made their debut previously on Black Moon's classic 1993 album Enta da Stage. Dah Shinin' was noted for its hardcore lyrical content and production, which was provided by Da Beatminerz members DJ Evil Dee, Mr. Walt, Rich Blak and Baby Paul.

The album marked the arrival of hip hop supergroup, the Boot Camp Clik, a prominent rap crew of the 1990s. The group includes Black Moon member Buckshot, Heltah Skeltah and Originoo Gunn Clappaz, as well as Tek and Steele. All members make an appearance on the posse cut "Cession at da Doghillee".

The album has gone on to sell over 300,000 copies in the United States, and includes the underground single "Bucktown". In 1998, the album was selected as one of The Source's 100 Best Rap Albums.

The album's cover draws its inspiration from Roy Ayers Ubiquity's 1972 album He's Coming.

== Track listing ==
No.	Title	Writer(s)	Producer(s)	Length
1.	"Timz 'n' Hood Chek"	Darrell A. Yates, Jr.; Tekomin B. Williams; Ewart C. Dewgarde	DJ Evil Dee	3:17
2.	"Wrektime"	Williams; Yates, Jr.; Walter V. Dewgarde	Mr. Walt	4:05
3.	"Wontime" (featuring Rockness Monsta)	Yates, Jr.; Williams; W. Dewgarde; Richard Nurse	Mr. Walt; Rich Blak	4:42
4.	"Wrekonize"	Yates, Jr.; Williams; Paul Anthony Hendricks	Baby Paul	3:54
5.	"Sound Bwoy Bureill" (featuring Top Dog and Starang Wondah)	Deshawn Jamal Yates; Williams; Yates, Jr.; Jack K. McNair; E. Dewgarde; W. Dewgarde	DJ Evil Dee; Mr. Walt	4:19
6.	"K.I.M."	Yates, Jr.; Williams; W. Dewgarde	Mr. Walt	2:55
7.	"Bucktown"	Yates, Jr.; Williams; E. Dewgarde	DJ Evil Dee; Mr. Walt	4:08
8.	"Stand Strong"	Yates Jr.; Williams; E. Dewgarde	DJ Evil Dee	4:10
9.	"Shinin........ / Next Shit" (featuring Buckshot)	E. Dewgarde/: Williams; Yates, Jr.; Kenyatta S. Blake; W. Dewgarde	DJ Evil Dee/Mr. Walt	5:30
10.	"Cession at da Doghillee" (featuring Buckshot, Heltah Skeltah, and O.G.C.)	Williams; Yates, Jr.; Blake; Bush; Sean D. Price; McNair; Yates; Powell; E. Dewgarde	DJ Evil Dee	5:15
11.	"Hellucination"	Williams; Yates, Jr.; E. Dewgarde	DJ Evil Dee	5:09
12.	"Home Sweet Home"	Williams; Yates, Jr.; Hendricks	Baby Paul	4:44
13.	"Wipe Ya Mouf"	Yates, Jr.; Williams; Blake; Hendricks	Baby Paul	4:45
14.	"Let's Git It On" (featuring Rockness Monsta)	Yates, Jr.; Williams; Bush; E. Dewgarde; W. Dewgarde	DJ Evil Dee; Mr. Walt	3:55
15.	"P.N.C. (Intro)"		DJ Evil Dee	1:06
16.	"P.N.C."	Williams; Yates, Jr.; E. Dewgarde	DJ Evil Dee	5:41
Total length:				1:07:35

Sample credits

- "Timz n Hood Chek" contains samples from "Bedroom" by Galt MacDermot, "The Sorcerer of Isis (The Ritual of the Mole)" by The Power of Zeus, and "U da Man" by Black Moon.
- "Wrektime" contains samples from "Somebody to Love" by Barbara & Ernie, "Get Out of My Life, Woman" by The Mad Lads, and "Forecast" by Eric Gale.
- "Wontime" contains samples from "Funky President (People It's Bad)" by James Brown and "Spoonin' Rap" by Spoonie Gee.
- "Wrekonize" contains samples from "Home on a Rainy Day" by The New York Port Authority, "Get Out of My Life, Woman" by Iron Butterfly, and "Blind Alley" by The Emotions. The remix contains a sample of "Just the Two of Us" by Grover Washington Jr and Bill Withers.
- "Sound Bwoy Bureill" contains samples from "My Heart Just Won't Let You Go" by The Waters, "False Sound" by Gregory Peck, and "Heart Song" by Ramatam.
- "K.I.M." contains samples from "Gimme Some More" by The J.B.'s and "Momma Miss America" by Paul McCartney.
- "Bucktown" contains samples from "Born to Be Blue" by Jack Bruce, "Why Can't People Be Colors Too?" by The Whatnauts, and interpolations of "U da Man" by Black Moon.
- "Stand Strong" contains samples from "The Look of Love" by Isaac Hayes, "Sport" by Lightnin' Rod and Kool & the Gang, and "Bucktown" by Smif-N-Wessun.
- "Shinin'........ / Next Shit" contains samples from "So You'll Know My Name" by The Roland Hanna Trio, "Orange Lady" by Weather Report, "The Jam" by Graham Central Station, "The Sorcerer of Isis (The Ritual of the Mole)" by The Power of Zeus, and an interpolation of "Stoned Is the Way of the Walk" by Cypress Hill.
- "Cession at da Doghillee" contains samples from "Harlem River Drive" by Bobbi Humphrey, "Knocking 'Round the Zoo" by James Taylor and the Flying Machine, and "Keep Your Distance" by Babe Ruth.
- "Hellucination" contains samples from "Only When I'm Dreaming" by Minnie Riperton and "Why Can't People Be Colors Too?" by The Whatnauts.
- "Home Sweet Home" contains samples from "We Live in Brooklyn, Baby" by Roy Ayers Ubiquity and "Hit or Miss" by Bo Diddley.
- "Wipe Ya Mouf" contains samples from "You're Welcome, Stop on By" by Ahmad Jamal, "Slow Dance" by Stanley Clarke, and an interpolation of "The Program" by Papa San.
- "Let's Git It On" contains samples from "After the Race" by Mandrill, "North Carolina" by Les McCann, and "Buffalo Gals" by Malcolm McLaren.
- "P.N.C." contains samples from "Get It Over" by One Way featuring Al Hudson, "Love Potion-Cheeba-Cheeba" by The Mighty Tom Cats, and "Vibe Riffs 1" by Monte Croft.

== Charts ==
=== Weekly charts ===
Chart (1995)	Peak position
US Billboard 200	59
US Top R&B/Hip-Hop Albums (Billboard)	5

=== Year-end charts ===
Chart (1995)	Position
US Top R&B/Hip-Hop Albums (Billboard)	75

=== Singles ===
Year	Song	Chart positions			
Year	Song	US Hot 100	US R&B	US Rap	US Dance Sales
1994	"Bucktown"	93	61	14	1
1994	"Let's Git It On"	—	—	14	—
1995	"Wrekonize"	—	95	29	5
1995	"Sound Bwoy Bureill"	—	—	29	—
1995	"Wontime"	—	—	48	18
