= Nocturnal (Heltah Skeltah album) =

Studio album by Heltah Skeltah
- Released: June 18, 1996
- Recorded: 1995–96
- Studios: Chung King; Dollar Cab (Brooklyn, NY); D&D; Unique
- Genres: East Coast hip hop; hardcore hip hop
- Length: 1:05:12
- Labels: Duck Down; Priority
- Producers: Buckshot (also exec.); Da Beatminerz; Dr. Kill Patient; E-Swift; Lord Jamar; Shaleek; Shawn J. Period; Supreme

Heltah Skeltah chronology
Nocturnal (1996)	Magnum Force (1998)

Singles from Nocturnal
- 1. "Leflaur Leflah Eshkoshka" Released: October 31, 1995; 2. "Operation Lock Down" Released: May 27, 1996; 3. "Therapy" Released: October 15, 1996

Professional ratings
Review scores
Source	Rating
AllMusic	4/5 stars
Muzik	4/5 stars
RapReviews	9/10
Spin	7/10
The Source	3.5/5 stars

Nocturnal is the debut studio album by American hip hop duo Heltah Skeltah. It was released on June 18, 1996, via Duck Down/Priority Records. The recording sessions took place at Chung King Studios, at Dollar Cab, at D&D Studios, and at Unique Recording Studios in New York City. It was produced by Da Beatminerz, Buckshot, Shaleek, Shawn J. Period, Supreme, E-Swift, Lord Jamar and Sean Price. It features guest appearances from Originoo Gunn Clappaz, Illa Noyz, Representativz and Vinia Mojica. The album peaked at number 35 on the Billboard 200 and number 5 on the Top R&B/Hip-Hop Albums.

== Background ==
The two made their debut on Smif-N-Wessun's 1995 album Dah Shinin'. Same year the duo teamed up with O.G.C. to form The Fab 5, and released the single "Blah" b/w "Leflaur Leflah Eshkoshka". "Leflah", which is included in the album, peaked at number 75 on the Billboard Hot 100 and became the biggest hit from the Boot Camp family to date. "Leflah" was re-released as an A-Side single in early 1996, featuring the first sole Heltah Skeltah track, "Letha Brainz Blo", as its B-Side. The first official single released from the album was "Operation Lock Down", produced by Tha Alkaholiks' E-Swift. Other singles released from the album were "Therapy" and "Da Wiggy".

The "Twin Towers" of the Boot Camp Clik gained much recognition and respect in the Hip Hop world with the release of their debut, now hailed as a 90's Hip Hop classic. Led by Rock's rough, booming voice and Ruck's strong lyrical ability, and backed by dark, grimy beats by Da Beatminerz, Shaleek, and others, the release received wide acclaim in the Hip Hop world, but didn't reach much further, selling around 250,000 copies in the US.

== Track listing ==
No.	Title	Writer(s)	Producer(s)	Length
1.	"Intro (Here We Come)" (featuring Starang Wondah)	Jahmal Bush; Jack McNair; Kenyatta Blake	Buckshot; Lord Jamar	3:29
2.	"Letha Brainz Blo"	Bush; Sean Price; Paul Hendricks	Baby Paul	4:19
3.	"Undastand"	Price; Bush; Hendricks	Baby Paul	4:15
4.	"Who Dat?"	Price; Bush; Blake	Buckshot	1:43
5.	"Sean Price" (featuring Illa Noyz)	Price; Darryl Pearson	Shaleek	4:19
6.	"Clan's, Posse's, Crew's & Clik's"	Bush; Price; Ewart Dewgarde	DJ Evil Dee	5:23
7.	"Therapy" (featuring Vinia Mojica)	Bush; Price; Vinia Mojica; Hendricks	Baby Paul	4:32
8.	"Place to Be"	Price; Bush; Shawn M. Jones	Shawn J. Period	2:45
9.	"Soldiers Gone Psyco"	Price; Bush; Hendricks	Baby Paul	3:40
10.	"The Square (Triple R)" (featuring Representativz)	Bush; Price; Louis Johnson; Demetrio Muniz	Supreme	4:20
11.	"Da Wiggy"	Price; Bush; Walter Dewgarde	Mr. Walt	4:12
12.	"Gettin Ass Gettin Ass"	Price; Mojica	Dr. Kill Patient	1:15
13.	"Leflaur Leflah Eshkoshka" (featuring O.G.C.)	Bush; Price; McNair; Dashawn Yates; Barret Powell; Hendricks	Baby Paul	5:03
14.	"Prowl" (featuring Louieville Sluggah)	Bush; Price; Powell; W. Dewgarde	Mr. Walt	4:13
15.	"Grate Unknown"	Price; Bush; Pearson	Shaleek	4:18
16.	"Operation Lock Down"	Bush; Price; Eric Brooks	E-Swift	4:25
17.	"Outro"			3:01
Total length:				1:05:12

Sample credits

- Track 2 contains samples from "The Look of Love" by Johnny Pate
- Track 3 contains samples from "Soul Girl" by Jeanne & the Darlings
- Track 13 contains samples from "Uzuri" by Catalyst
- Track 14 contains samples from "Danube Incident" by Lalo Schifrin
- Track 15 contains samples from "I Cover the Waterfront" and "Blame It on My Youth" by Gloria Lynne
- Track 16 contains samples from "Theme From Summer of '42" by George Benson

== Album singles ==
Single information
"Leflaur Leflah Eshkoshka"
- Released: October 31, 1995
- B-Side: "Letha Brainz Blo"
"Operation Lock Down"
- Released: May 27, 1996
- B-Side: "Da Wiggy"
"Therapy"
- Released: October 15, 1996
- B-Side: "Place to Be"

== Music videos ==
- "Leflaur Leflah Eshkoshka" (1995) Director: Marcus Turner
- "Operation Lock Down" (1996)
- "Therapy" (1996) Director: Gobi Najed

== Charts ==
=== Weekly charts ===
Chart (1996)	Peak position
US Billboard 200	35
US Top R&B/Hip-Hop Albums (Billboard)	5

=== Year-end charts ===
Chart (1996)	Position
US Top R&B/Hip-Hop Albums (Billboard)	70

=== Singles ===
Year	Song	Chart positions			
Year	Song	US Hot 100	US R&B/Hip-Hop	US Rap	US Dance/Maxi-Singles
1995	"Leflaur Leflah Eshkoshka"	75	51	8	19
1996	"Operation Lock Down"	—	64	15	13
1996	"Da Wiggy"	—	—	15	—
1996	"Therapy"	—	77	16	21
