= Who Got da Props =

1992 single by Black Moon

Single by Black Moon

from the album Enta da Stage
- B-side: "Fuck It Up"
- Released: October 22, 1992
- Recorded: 1992
- Studio: The Dewgrade Crib Of Hits (New York, NY); D&D Studios
- Genre: Hip hop
- Length: 4:30
- Label: Nervous Records
- Songwriter(s): Kenyatta Blake; Ewart Dewgarde; Walter Dewgarde
- Producer(s): DJ Evil Dee

Black Moon singles chronology
"Who Got da Props" (1992)	"How Many MC's..." (1993)

Music video
- "Who Got Da Props" on YouTube

"Who Got da Props" (titled on the single as "Who Got the Props") is a song written by American rapper Buckshot and record producer Evil Dee of Da Beatminerz, performed by East Coast hip hop group Black Moon. It was recorded in 1992 and produced by Evil Dee. Pre-production took place at the Dewgarde Crib of Hits with following recording sessions at D&D Studios in New York. It was released in 1992, through Nervous Records as the lead single from the group's debut studio album Enta da Stage, marking the debut on hip hop scene by both the artists and the label. Accompanying music video was directed by Ralph McDaniels.

"Who Got da Props" peaked at number 86 on the Billboard Hot 100, number 60 on the Hot R&B/Hip-Hop Songs and number 28 on both Hot Rap Singles and Hot Dance Music/Maxi-Singles Sales in the United States, becoming the group's highest charted single to date. In 2013, Complex listed the song at #25 on its 'The 50 Best Debut Rap Singles'.

== Charts ==
Chart (1993)	Peak position
US Billboard Hot 100	86
US Hot R&B/Hip-Hop Songs (Billboard)	60

== Track listing ==
"Who Got the Props" (12"), Nervous Records (NER 20026)

- Ruff Side

1. "Who Got the Props" (Evil Dee's Deadly Mix) – (5:00)

2. "Who Got the Props" (Evil Dee's Deadly Instrumental) – (4:51)

3. "Who Got the Props" (MW Smooth Mix) – (4:49)

- Rugged Side

4. "Fuck It Up" (Rugged and Ruff Mix) – (4:00)

5. "Fuck It Up" (Rugged and Ruff Instrumental) – (3:59)

6. "Who Got the Props" (MW Smooth Instrumental) – (4:53)

== Personnel ==
- Kenyatta Blake – songwriter, vocals
- Ewart Dewgrade – songwriter, producer, mixing
- Shlomo Sonnenfeld – engineering, additional producer on MW Smooth versions
- Walt Dewgrade – mixing on MW Smooth versions
- Chuck Chillout – executive producer
