= Violadores del Verso =

Spanish rap music crew

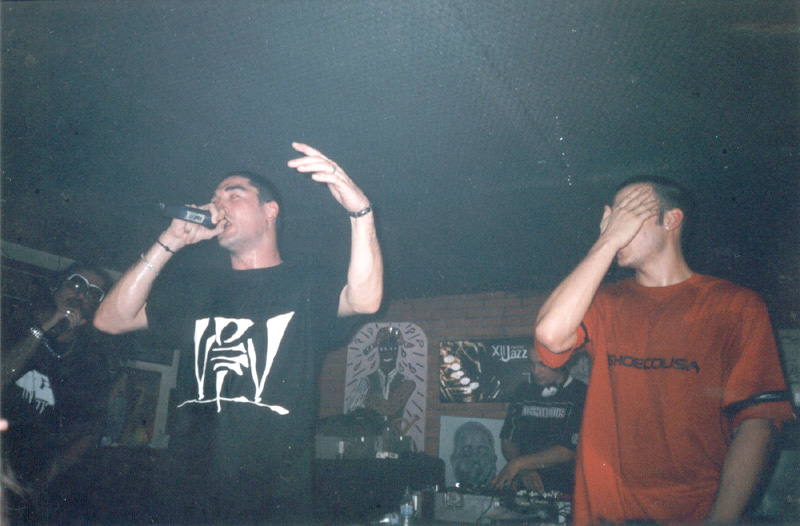
- Violadores del Verso in 2002 (from left to right): Sho-Hai, Kase.O, R de Rumba and Lírico.

Background information
- Origin: Zaragoza, Spain
- Genres: Rap, hip hop
- Years active: 1998–Present
- Labels: Avoid Records, 1998; Boa Music, 1999 - 2001; Rap Solo, 2001 - Present
- Members: Kase.O ((Javier Ibarra)); Lírico (David Gilaberte); Sho-Hai (aka Hate) (Sergio Rodríguez); R de Rumba (Rubén Cuevas)
- Past members: Brutal (Sergio Ibarra)
- Website: www.violadoresdelverso.org

Violadores del Verso (Spanish: Lyrical Molesters or Verse Rapists), formerly also known as Doble V, are a rap music group from Spain.

== History ==
Violadores del Verso was started in 1997 in Zaragoza, Spain by David Gilaberte (Lírico), Sergio Rodriguez (Sho-Hai/Hate), Rubén Cuevas (R de Rumba) and brothers Javier (Kase.O) and Sergio Ibarra (Brutal).

They released their first LP Genios in 1999. In 2001 they released two further albums as Doble V, a name they used until asked to desist to avoid association with Doble V whisky, a trademark owned by the Pernod Ricard drinks concern. In 2006, they released their fourth LP Vivir para contarlo, which went gold after ten days. In 2007 the group won the regional award for Spain in the MTV Europe Music Awards.

The group has been on hiatus since 2010 while its members pursue solo projects. The group's last concert before the pause was aired in August 2011 as a 3D transmission by national TV broadcaster Televisión Española (TVE), to pilot of the 3D technology involved.

In 2022, the group rejoined to record the track Únicos that appeared on Sho-Hai's solo album Polvo.

== Discography ==
- Violadores del verso (Bufank Records, 1997)
- Violadores del verso (EP) (Avoid Records, 1998)
- Violadores del Verso presentan a Kase-O en: Mierda (Maxi) (Avoid Records, 1998)
- Genios (LP) (Avoid, 1999)
- Atrás (Maxi) (Rap Solo, 2001)
- Violadores del Verso + Kase-O Mierda (Reissue, (Boa Music, 2001)
- Vicios y Virtudes (LP) (Rap Solo/Boa Music, 2001)
- Tú eres alguien/Bombo clap (live DVD) (Rap Solo/Boa Music, 2002)
- Vivir para contarlo / Haciendo lo nuestro (Maxi) (Rap Solo/Boa Music, 2006)
- Gira 06/07 Presente (LP/DVD) (Rap Solo/Boa Music, 2007)

== See also ==
- Spanish hip hop
- SFDK
