= Enta da Stage =

Studio album by Black Moon
- Released: October 19, 1993
- Recorded: 1992–1993
- Studio: D&D Studios (New York City)
- Genre: East Coast hip-hop
- Length: 56:54
- Label: Nervous
- Producer: Da Beatminerz

Black Moon chronology
Enta da Stage (1993)	Diggin' in dah Vaults (1996)

Singles from Enta da Stage
- 1. "Who Got da Props" Released: October 22, 1992; 2. "How Many MC's..." Released: June 9, 1993; 3. "I Got Cha Opin (Remix)" Released: March 28, 1994; 4. "Buck Em Down (Remix)" Released: November 7, 1994

Enta da Stage is the debut album by American East Coast hip-hop group Black Moon, released on October 19, 1993, through Nervous Records. The album was produced by Black Moon member DJ Evil Dee, along with Mr. Walt of Da Beatminerz. Enta da Stage features the debut of underground hip-hop duo Smif-N-Wessun, as well as appearances from Havoc of Mobb Deep and Dru Ha, the co-founder of Duck Down Records.

Despite being critically acclaimed and having two singles that charted on the Billboard Hot 100 ("Who Got da Props" and "I Got Cha Opin"), the album sold poorly. Enta da Stage served as a precursor to the resurgence of the New York hip-hop scene in the mid-1990s. The album was executive produced by Dru Ha and Mike Weiss.

== Background ==
Black Moon originated in Brooklyn in the late 1980s as a group called Unique Image, which consisted of high school students Ewart "Evil Dee" Dewgrade, Karim "5ft" Reid, Walter "Finsta" Giddens, and Kenyatte "Buckshot" Blake. After briefly changing their name from Unique Image to High Tech, the group settled on Black Moon, which was the name Evil Dee's older brother–Walter "Mr. Walt" Dewgrade–used for his record production company. Initially, all four members rapped, but by 1991 Evil Dee and Finsta stopped rapping and instead focused on production. According to Evil Dee: "Once we did that and got focused, that's when we started getting really serious about it ... 5ft and Buckshot just stepped up their game and got nice on the rhymes."

Black Moon began shopping a five-track demo to various record labels, although they were consistently rejected for a perceived lack of commercial viability. During this period, Finsta left the group. In the spring of 1992, Black Moon performed at a party, and audience member DJ Chuck Chillout arranged for the group to meet with Nervous Records owner Mike Weiss. At the insistence of A&R representative Gladys Pizarro, Weiss signed Black Moon, and gave them enough money to record their first single, "Who Got da Props". (Note: In the tracklist for the single, the song is titled "Who Got da Props" without a question mark. In the tracklist for Enta da Stage, the song is titled "Who Got da Props?" with a question mark.)

"Who Got da Props" was released in October 1992, and reached number 86 on the Billboard Hot 100. The group members were surprised by the success of the single, and in February 1993, Weiss convinced them to record an album. Buckshot soon formed a close relationship with Nervous employee Drew Friedman, later known as Dru Ha. The two formed a management company named "Duck Down Management", and oversaw the release of Enta da Stage as co-executive producers. The group finished recording Enta da Stage at New York City's D&D Studios between late 1992 and early 1993, and prepared it for a late 1993 release date.

== Music ==
Much of the acclaim the album received was due to the performance of lead MC Buckshot, who originally went by the name Buckshot Shorty. Ten of the fourteen tracks on the album are Buckshot solo tracks, and he appears on every song but "Son Get Wrec". Buck, who was eighteen at the time of the recording, was a young man trying to establish himself and his crew in the hip-hop world. In a 2005 interview with MVRemix, Buckshot described a day in his life while recording his debut:

Enta da Stage was really rough for me. It was a really rough era. A lot of people don't know what I went through personally. I think I had just turned eighteen and I had the pressure of running a management company as an eighteen-year-old shorter than 5'6. I had that problem of people taking my company and my representation seriously. So a day in the life around the Enta da Stage era was based on constant struggle and lettin' people know you respect Duck Down management as a real management company and not just as some little cute thing that Buckshot is doing. Nah, for real, we're management type deal. I was battling keeping Smif-n-Wessun in a good deal, I was battling trying to get Heltah Skeltah a good deal. I was battling trying to bring my record company into existence, so it was a really hard time.

=== Lyrics ===
The album's lyrics are filled with violent narratives and braggadocio. AllMusic's Chris Witt stated that "Emcees Buckshot and 5ft Accelerator attack their verses with an aggressive nihilism not heard since Kool G Rap's peak." 5 ft, originally known as 5FT Accelerator, appears on three tracks here, and his lyrical content does not differ from that of Buckshot's. Unlike later work by New York City peers like Nas, the lyrical content found here does not peer deeply into social issues or provide much substance. AllMusic's album review stated that "Theirs is a grim reality, filled with guns, weed and violence. Buckshot displays none of the usual gangster remorse, he is a willful public menace."

Buckshot was praised not only for his lyricism, but also for his lyrical delivery and breath control, with his flow and dramatic, conversational vocal tones being seen as original and entertaining. In a 2005 interview with AllHipHop, hip-hop producer 9th Wonder stated that Buckshot's style strongly influenced his current sound, and that the singles "Who Got da Props?" and "How Many MC's..." changed his life.

The album's choruses involve multiple voices yelling the lyrics. These vocals were provided by Smif-n-Wessun, Mr. Walt, Mobb Deep's Havoc and the trio themselves. "Niguz Talk Shit", "Who Got da Props?", "Ack Like U Want It", "Buck Em Down", "Black Smif-n-Wessun", "Son Get Wrec", "Make Munne" and "U da Man" all feature "Black Moon hooks".

=== Production ===
DJ Evil Dee and Mr. Walt of Da Beatminerz, who produced the album, put their samplers to use here, lacing the album with their signature basement sound, filled with hard drums, grimy horn arrangements and deep basslines. In the album's liner notes, DJ Evil Dee stated: "This album was done on blunted terms. Anyone who is offended by the contents of the album, FUCK YOU. Nuff said." AllMusic describes the dark production: "The Beatminerz production crew craft subterranean beats to match Buckshot's mayhem. The tracks are dark, layered with muted jazz samples, and seemingly bottomless." A few of the samples used here were later recreated by a number of hip-hop artists in the 1990s. The single "Buck Em Down" features a sample from Donald Byrd's "Wind Parade", a sample which was later re-used for Organized Konfusion's 1994 concept track "Stray Bullet". "How Many MC's..." features a sample from Grover Washington, Jr.'s "Hydra", which was used for earlier hip-hop tracks like EPMD's "Underground". The iconic "Who Got Da Props" heavily utilizes a looped sample from Ronnie Laws's jazz classic "Tidal Wave", which was featured in several hip-hop and R&B tracks, including Usher's "Think Of You" from his self-titled 1994 album. Evil Dee and Walt take a portion of the sample and craft it into a different loop.

An Enta da Stage review on OhWord.com praises the production work, stating "Though the album's success is largely attributable to Buckshot's performance, one cannot ignore the phenomenal production from the Beatminerz. They took the already dark sound of The Low End Theory and one-upped it, filtering out almost all treble and using spare, hardcore drum samples. The compositions of Mr. Walt and Evil Dee are also cleverly structured, propelling Buckshot's raps directly into the listener's psyche."..."The crackle of scratched vinyl pervades the album, contributing to the feel of warmth and timelessness. Thanks to the Beatminerz, there is something inviting about Enta da Stage, despite its confrontational lyrics."

== Singles ==
Enta da Stage featured four singles and music videos, including their debut "Who Got da Props?". In mid-1993, the "How Many MC's..." single was released; it became popular in the underground rap circuit, but was not able to find success with mainstream audiences, barely breaking into the Top 50 on the Hot Rap Singles chart. The third single from the album was a remix of "I Got Cha Opin", which utilized a smooth jazz sample, courtesy of Barry White's "Playing Your Game Baby". The single became the group's second Billboard Hot 100 hit in 1994, peaking at number 93.

The last single, "Buck Em Down", was released in mid-1994, with the music video featuring the remixed version.

The album spawned additional remixes. Along with "I Got Cha Opin" and "Buck Em Down", the tracks "Ack like U Want It", "Son Get Wrec", "Shit Iz Real", "How Many MC's..." and "U da Man" all featured remixes, which were later included on Black Moon's Diggin' in dah Vaults compilation.

== Reception ==
Professional ratings
Review scores
Source	Rating
AllMusic	4.5/5 stars
Encyclopedia of Popular Music	4/5 stars
Rolling Stone	3/5 stars
The Source	4/5 stars

Enta da Stage has received generally favorable reviews from most music critics and publications. Chris H. Smith of Vibe highlighted Black Moon's lyrics for their blunt "sincerity", noting that they avoided tropes such as "self-conscious intermissions between songs" and "cartoonish renderings of ghetto life". Reviewing the album in the November 1993 issue of The Source, journalist Cheo H. Coker stated:

Enta da Stage is a stunning debut that does not disappoint by any stretch of the imagination. The only term that adequately describes Black Moon's smooth combination of funky jazz rhythms and ferocious vocals is 'elegant madness.' It's nice to see that there are still shining spots of originality to be found in a genre that's becoming increasingly overrun by bogus bandwagon jumpers just out to make a quick buck. Make this jammie a priority.

Though praised for its originality and production, Enta da Stage has also seen criticism for its monotony and lack of lyrical substance. Rolling Stone writer Touré criticized the release for "ignorance" and felt that it failed to capitalize on its promise, stating that Black Moon "leave blank the ultimate canvas – the self." Joe Levy of The Village Voice accused the group of posturing in their lyrics, remarking that "they sound less like gang-bangers than neighbourhood kids who wish they were in a gang—kids so desperate for cred they're worse than the real thing."

In 1998, Enta da Stage was selected as one of The Source's 100 Best Rap Albums. In naming it the fourth greatest album on About.com's list of the Best Rap Albums of 1993, columnist Henry Adaso noted that "Unlike most hip-hop albums of its era, Enta Da Stage eschewed confrontational raps and opted for brooding, electrifying brand of hip-hop."

Commercial performance

In Brian Coleman's book Check the Technique, Buckshot says the album has sold over 400,000 copies.

== Influence ==
Though not as widely heralded as similar groundbreaking East Coast albums with commercial success such as Nas' Illmatic, The Notorious B.I.G.'s Ready to Die, Wu-Tang Clan's Enter the Wu-Tang (36 Chambers), Onyx's Bacdafucup and Mobb Deep's The Infamous, Enta da Stage was critically acclaimed on a similar level. Though all of the albums mentioned above were able to reach at least Gold status, Enta da Stage, released before most of these albums, has not sold nearly as well, selling just over 350,000 copies in the U.S. as of June 2006. AllMusic described the importance of the album: "It set the tone for much of the hip hop to follow. Biggie Smalls' suicidal thoughts and Noreaga's boisterous thuggery both have their roots here. The album marked a turning point in hip hop." Enta da Stage has also been described as "Era defining", and was one of the pioneering releases during the return of New York City's street hip-hop resurgence of the mid 1990s, after the West Coast's reign of the early 1990s. Enta da Stage is still prominent among hip-hop artists today, such as lyrics from "How Many MC's..." being used as a hook for Jedi Mind Trick's song "Speech Cobras".

The album also served as the introduction of the supergroup Boot Camp Clik. The collective was a prominent underground rap group in the 1990s – also producing the acclaimed Smif-n-Wessun's Dah Shinin', Heltah Skeltah's Nocturnal, and O.G.C.'s Da Storm. Enta da Stage heralded the debut of Da Beatminerz. After producing here, and on other Boot Camp albums Dah Shinin', Nocturnal and Da Storm, Mr. Walt and Evil Dee went on to expand their sounds, and produce for popular artists like Afu-Ra, Big Daddy Kane, Craig G, De La Soul, Dilated Peoples, Eminem, Flipmode Squad, Jean Grae, KRS-One, M.O.P., Naughty by Nature, O.C. and Black Star. The album is extensively broken down track-by-track by Buckshot, DJ Evil Dee, and Mr. Walt of Da Beatminerz in Brian Coleman's book Check the Technique (2007).

== Track listing ==
Track listing and producer information is taken from the CD.

No.	Title	Writer(s)	Length
1.	"Powaful Impak!" (performed by Buckshot)	Kenyatta Blake; Ewart Dewgarde	4:02
2.	"Niguz Talk Shit" (performed by Buckshot)	Blake; E. Dewgarde	4:19
3.	"Who Got da Props" (performed by Buckshot)	Blake; E. Dewgarde	4:24
4.	"Ack Like U Want It" (performed by Buckshot and 5ft)	Blake; Kasim Reid; E. Dewgarde; Walt Dewgarde	4:52
5.	"Buck Em Down" (performed by Buckshot)	Blake; E. Dewgarde; Larry Mizell	4:37
6.	"Black Smif-n-Wessun" (performed by Buckshot and Smif-n-Wessun)	Blake; Tekomin Williams; Darrell Yates; E. Dewgarde	4:18
7.	"Son Get Wrec" (performed by 5ft)	Reid; E. Dewgarde	3:26
8.	"Make Munne" (performed by Buckshot)	Blake; W. Dewgarde	4:23
9.	"Slave" (performed by Buckshot)	Blake; E. Dewgarde	2:47
10.	"I Got Cha Opin" (performed by Buckshot)	Blake; W. Dewgarde	4:10
11.	"Shit Iz Real" (performed by Buckshot)	Blake; E. Dewgarde	3:53
12.	"Enta Da Stage" (performed by Buckshot)	Blake; W. Dewgarde; Ernie Watts; Fredro Scruggs; Kirk Jones; Tyrone Taylor; Marlon Fletcher	2:49
13.	"How Many MC's..." (performed by Buckshot)	Blake; E. Dewgarde; W. Dewgarde; Kenyatta; Grover Washington Jr.	3:53
14.	"U Da Man" (performed by Buckshot, 5ft, Dru-Ha, Havoc and Smif-N-Wessun)	Blake; E. Dewgarde; Kasim Reid; Drew Friedman; Kejuan Muchita; Tekomin Williams; Darrell Yates	4:18
Total length:			56:54

Notes

- "Ack Like U Want It" and "Slave" were not on the vinyl release. "Shit Iz Real" is also not on digital streaming music platforms.

== Personnel ==
Credits for Enta da Stage adapted from liner notes.

- Buckshot – vocals, background vocals, producer, executive producer
- 5ft – vocals, producer, background vocals
- DJ Evil Dee – producer, background vocals
- Mr. Walt – producer, background vocals
- Tek – vocals, background vocals
- Steele – vocals, background vocals
- Havoc – vocals, background vocals
- Dru Ha – vocals, background vocals, executive producer
- Everette Lawson – background vocals
- Lynn Blackwell – background vocals
- Leo "Swift" Morris – main engineer
- Eddie Sancho – assistant engineer
- Luke Allen – assistant engineer
- Luis Tineo – assistant engineer
- Dave Carpenter – assistant engineer
- Joe Quinde – assistant engineer
- Merge One – art direction
- C² – art direction, photography
- Chi Modu – photography

== Chart history ==
Album

Chart (1993)	Peak position
U.S. Top Heatseekers	7
U.S. Top R&B/Hip-Hop Albums	33

Singles

Year	Song	Chart positions			
Year	Song	Billboard Hot 100	Hot R&B/Hip-Hop Singles & Tracks	Hot Rap Singles	Hot Dance Music/Maxi-Singles Sales
1993	"Who Got da Props?"	86	60	28	28
1993	"How Many MC's..."	—	97	48	17
1994	"I Got Cha Opin" (remix)	93	55	15	4
1994	"Buck Em Down"	—	81	17	2
