= Black Moon (group) =

American hip hop group

- Origin: Brooklyn, New York City, U.S.
- Genres: East Coast hip hop; underground hip hop; hardcore hip hop
- Years active: 1992–2006; 2011–present
- Labels: Nervous; Priority; Duck Down
- Members: Buckshot; 5ft DJ Evil Dee

Black Moon (backronymed as Brothers Lyrically Acting Combining Kicking Music Out On Nations) is an American underground hip hop group from Brooklyn, New York. Formed in 1992 by East Coast rappers Buckshot and 5ft and record producer DJ Evil Dee, they debuted in 1992 with the release of the single "Who Got da Props". The group was most notable for their debut album Enta da Stage, and their affiliation with the Boot Camp Clik. As of 2024, the group has released four studio albums.

== Biography ==
=== Early years ===
The roots of Black Moon go back to Brooklyn's Bushwick High School, where Kasim "5ft" Reid and Ewart "DJ Evil Dee" Dewgrade met and formed a group called Unique Image. The two later met a former backup dancer Kenyatte "Buckshot" Blake in the Brownsville, Brooklyn and formed a friendship based on similar musical aspirations.

The trio released their first single "Who Got da Props" in 1992, which peaked at number 86 on the U.S. Billboard Hot 100 singles chart. With the help of DJ Chuck Chillout, the group signed a record deal with New York-based independent label Nervous Records, becoming the first hip hop act on then-house music-oriented record label.

The group recruited Evil Dee's older brother Walter "Mr. Walt" Dewgrade for recording the pre-production of their debut studio album, which eventually led to the formation of hip hop production team Da Beatminerz between Dewgrade brothers. Black Moon premiered its debut studio album, Enta da Stage, on October 19, 1993, including "Who Got da Props?", "Son Get Wrec", "How Many MC's...", "Buck Em Down" and another Hot 100 hit single "I Got Cha Opin (Remix)". The album featured guest appearances from Havoc of Mobb Deep, Nervious Records' intern and promoter Drew "Dru-Ha" Friedman, and debuting hip hop duo Smif-N-Wessun. Enta da Stage went on to sell over 350,000 copies in the U.S. Following the album's release, the group temporarily broke up.

=== Departure from Nervous Records ===
Member Buckshot and Dru Ha formed Duck Down Management in 1994 to formally manage Black Moon and Smif-N-Wessun. The year 1995 saw the release of Smif-N-Wessun's debut album Dah Shinin' through Nervous Records' sub-label Wreck Records, which featured contributions from Evil Dee with his extended production team Da Beatminerz and Buckshot, who recruited fellow Brooklyn local groups Heltah Skeltah and Originoo Gunn Clappaz to form a supergroup called the Boot Camp Clik.

Due to the group's hiatus, Black Moon refused to submit a new album for Nervous Records and were dropped from the label. However, in late 1996 Nervous Records released a Black Moon compilation album titled Diggin' in dah Vaults, which featured a number of remixes and b-side tracks. The album was not authorized by the group as the label bootlegged it and became entangled in a legal battle over the licensing rights of their group name, which lasted for a number of years. The case was finally settled in 1998, and the group was able to license its name through Nervous.

In 1999, the group released its long-awaited second album War Zone through Priority Records. The album saw a change in the group's musical style, with a more mature and more serious lyrical delivery from member Buckshot, more vocal contributions from member 5 ft (who appeared on three songs from Enta da Stage and six songs on War Zone), and also featured a new lo-fi production sound from the original two members of Da Beatminerz. Alongside several Boot Camp Click members, it features guest appearances from rappers Busta Rhymes, Heather B., M.O.P., Q-Tip and Teflon. Despite its singles "Two Turntables & a Mic" and "This Is What It Sounds Like (Worldwind)" made small impact on the Billboard charts, the album reached number 35 on the U.S. Billboard 200 albums chart and remains the group's highest charted full-length.

=== 2000s ===
DJ Evil Dee continued production work with Da Beatminerz, and Buckshot continued to work with the Boot Camp Clik. In 2004 the group released a documentary film Behind the Moon. In 2005, Buckshot released a collaborative album with producer 9th Wonder titled Chemistry. In 2006, DJ Evil Dee and Mr. Walt released a mixtape titled Alter the Chemistry, which paired Buckshot's vocals from the Chemistry album with classic Black Moon beats.

=== 2010s ===
It was recently confirmed by the group in 2011 that it started recording its fourth album together called Dark Side of the Moon and to be entirely produced again by Da Beatminerz, with possible new members to its production team. However, the event did not happen until 2019, when the group scheduled to reunite for their first album in 16 years. The trio's fourth studio album entitled Rise of da Moon was released on October 18, 2019, featuring guest appearances from Method Man, Rock of Heltah Skeltah, and the group's long time collaborators Smif-N-Wessun.

== Discography ==
=== Studio albums ===
- Enta da Stage (1993)
- War Zone (1999)
- Total Eclipse (2003)
- Rise of da Moon (2019)

=== Compilation albums ===
- Diggin' in dah Vaults (1996)

=== Remix albums ===
List of remix albums, showing year released
Title	Details
Alter the Chemistry (with Buckshot)	Released: September 26, 2006; Label: Bucktown USA Ent (BTU 5002); Format: CD, digital download
