= Da Beatminerz =

American hip-hop production team

- Origin: Brooklyn, New York City, U.S.
- Genres: Hip-hop
- Years active: 1992–present
- Labels: Rawkus; Copter
- Members: Mr. Walt; DJ Evil Dee
- Past members: Baby Paul; Rich Blak; Chocolate Ty

Da Beatminerz are an American hip-hop production team from Bushwick, Brooklyn that is popular with the underground hip-hop scene.

== History ==
The crew, originally composed of brothers Mr. Walt (born June 2, 1968) and DJ Evil Dee (born May 24, 1971), formed in 1992, making their production debut with Evil Dee's group Black Moon, on its debut single, "Who Got Da Props?" The duo produced the entirety of Black Moon's acclaimed debut album, Enta Da Stage, in 1993, then continued production work with Black Moon's Buckshot and his crew Boot Camp Clik. In 1995, along with its third official member, Baby Paul, the group produced the entirety of Smif-N-Wessun's debut album, Dah Shinin'. It continued work with fellow Boot Camp members Heltah Skeltah and O.G.C. in 1996, contributing multiple beats for their respective debuts, Nocturnal and Da Storm. In the late 1990s, da Beatminerz expanded its client list, producing popular hip-hop artists such as Afu-Ra, Black Star, Eminem, Flipmode Squad, M.O.P., De La Soul, Mic Geronimo, and O.C.

Also in 1996, they appeared on the Red Hot Organization's compilation CD, America is Dying Slowly, alongside Biz Markie, Wu-Tang Clan, and Fat Joe, among many other prominent hip-hop artists. The CD, meant to raise awareness of the AIDS epidemic among African American men, was heralded as "a masterpiece" by The Source magazine.

By 2001, the crew expanded to five members, with producers Rich Blak and Chocolate Ty joining Baby Paul, Evil Dee, and Mr. Walt. That year, the group released its debut album, Brace 4 Impak, on popular independent label Rawkus Records, featuring guest appearances from Royce da 5'9", Black Moon, Ras Kass, Diamond D, Cocoa Brovaz, Pete Rock, Talib Kweli, Freddie Foxxx, Jean Grae, and Naughty by Nature. The album's lead single, "Take That," became a hip-hop hit in 2001, hitting the Top 5 on the Hot Rap Singles chart. By 2004, the crew narrowed back to its original members, Evil Dee and Mr. Walt, and the duo released its second album, Fully Loaded w/ Statik, on Copter Records. In the new millennium, the group has crafted beats for artists such as Akrobatik, Big Daddy Kane, Black Moon, Boot Camp Clik, Craig G, Dilated Peoples, Jean Grae, KRS-One, Naughty By Nature, Smif-N-Wessun, and Wordsworth. Currently, Da Beatminerz are running their own internet radio station. They are currently set to produce the entirety of Black Moon's next LP, 'Dark Side Of The Moon'.

== Discography ==
=== Albums ===
- Brace 4 Impak (2001, Rawkus Records)
- Fully Loaded w/ Statik (2004, Copter Records)
- Unmarked Music Vol. 1 (2007, Raw Deal Records)
- Rah Deluxe (2022, Supremacist ) Single

=== Production ===
Year	Artist	Album	Songs Produced
1992	Finsta Baby	Finsta Baby 12"	1
1992	Ultramagnetic MCs	Poppa Large 12"	1
1993	Black Moon	Enta da Stage	Totality
1994	Black Moon	I Gotcha Opin' / Reality... 12"	2
1994	Black Moon / Smif-n-Wessun	Headz Ain't Readee / Murder MCs 12"	2
1994	House of Pain	On Point 12"	1
1994	House of Pain	Over There 12"	1
1994	DFC	Things in tha Hood EP	1 of 5
1994	Terror Fabulous	Yaga Yaga 12"	1
1994	Miss Jones	Don't Front 12"	1
1995	Smif-N-Wessun	Dah Shinin'	Totality
1995	Smif-N-Wessun	Wreckonize / Sound Bwoy Buriel 12"	2
1995	Sista, Craig Mack	Dangerous Minds (soundtrack)	1 of 12
1995	Brothers of the Mind	Rough & Tough (Daytime/Nytetime Mix) 12"	2
1995	Don T	Professional Girls' Man	1 of 11
1995	Doug E. Fresh	Play	1 of 14
1995	Lady Apache	Rock and Comeen 12"	1
1995	Ill Breed	The D&D Project	1 of 12
1995	Mic Geronimo	The Natural	2 of 13
1995	8Ball & MJG	Break 'Em Off 12"	1
1995	D'Influence	Waiting 12"	1
1996	A+	All I See 12"	1
1996	Bahamadia	Kollage	4 of 15
1996	The Roots	Silent Treatment 12"	1
1996	Heather B.	Takin' Mine	1 of 10
1996	Mondo Grosso	Diggin' in the Real	1 of 7
1996	Heltah Skeltah	Nocturnal	8 of 17
1996	DJ Krush	Meiso 12"	1
1996	The Pharcyde	Drop 12"	1
1996	De La Soul	America Is Dying Slowly	1 of 16
1996	Mark Morrison	Return of the Mack 12"	1
1996	Sadat X	Wild Cowboys	1 of 15
1996	Shadez of Brooklyn	Change / When It Rainz It Pours 12"	2
1996	Originoo Gunn Clappaz	Da Storm	8 of 15
1996	Black Moon	Diggin' in dah Vaults	Totality
1997	Rino	回帰線 12"	1
1997	Neneh Cherry	Feel It 12"	1
1997	Afro Jazz	Afrocalypse	2 of 17
1997	Artifacts	That's Them	3 of 16
1997	Aquasky	Raw Skillz 12"	1
1997	Joe	No One Else Comes Close EP	1 of 2
1997	Next	Rated Next	1 of 18
1997	Fünf Sterne Deluxe	5 Sterne Deluxe 12"	1
1997	Jungle Brothers	Brain 12"	1
1997	Royal Flush	Ghetto Millionaire	1 of 22
1997	O.C.	Jewelz	3 of 15
1998	Shadz of Brooklyn	Diamond Mine / Calm Under Pressure 12"	2
1998	Funkdoobiest	The Troubleshooters	1 of 20
1998	Cocoa Brovaz	The Rude Awakening	4 of 17
1998	M.O.P.	First Family 4 Life	1 of 17
1998	Cheyenne	Your Hot Lips / Keep in Touch 12"	2
1998	Black Star	Mos Def & Talib Kweli Are Black Star	1 of 13
1998	Fat Joe	Don Cartagena	1 of 15
1998	Hussein Fatal	In the Line of Fire	1 of 11
1998	Flipmode Squad	The Imperial	1 of 16
1999	Black Moon	War Zone	Totality
1999	Black Moon	Worldwind 12"	1
1999	Eminem	Soundbombing II	1 of 27
1999	Originoo Gunn Clappaz	The M-Pire Shrikez Back	1 of 17
1999	Brixx	Everything Happens for a Reason	3 of 24
1999	Duck Down	Duck Down Presents: The Album	4 of 15
1999	Ras Kass	Oral Sex 12"	1
1999	Pharoahe Monch	Next Friday (soundtrack)	1 of 15
2000	Afu-Ra	Body of the Life Force	1 of 18
2000	Rah Digga	Dirty Harriet	1 of 18
2001	Nas	Stillmatic	1 of 14
2001	Dilated Peoples	Expansion Team	1 of 16
2002	KRS-One	The Mix Tape	1 of 13
2002	D&D ALL STARS	D&D Project	2 of 14
2002	Boot Camp Clik	The Chosen Few	3 of 15
2002	Krumbsnatcha	Respect All Fear None	2 of 15
2002	AZ	Aziatic	1 of 14
2002	Naughty By Nature	IIcons	2 of 18
2002	Jean Grae	Attack of the Attacking Things	2 of 12
2002	Akrobatic	Balance	1 of 15
2003	Black Moon	Total Eclipse	9 of 17
2003	The Last Emperor	Music, Magic, Myth	6 of 21
2003	KRS-One	Kristyles	3 of 17
2004	Truth Enola	6 O'Clock Straight	1 of 20
2004	Vast Aire	Look Mom... No Hands	1 of 17
2005	Ghostface Killah & Trife	Put It on the Line	1 of 15
2005	Tek & Steele	Smif 'n' Wessun: Reloaded	4 of 15
2006	Boot Camp Clik	The Last Stand	1 of 14
2006	Buckshot	Alter the Chemistry	Totality
2009	Tiye Phoenix	Half Woman, Half Amazin'	1 of 13
2009	Steele	Welcome to Bucktown	1 of 14
2010	Vinnie Paz	Season of the Assassin	1 of 21
2011	Apathy	Honkey Kong	1 of 23
2014	Apathy	Connecticut Casual	1 of 12
2016	Truth	From Ashes to Kingdom Come	1 of 17
2019	Truth	The Fight for Survival	2 of 15
2022	Truth	For All Intents and Purposes	Totality
2024	Truth	Nostalgia ThEraPy	Totality
