= Buckshot (rapper) =

American rapper (born 1974)

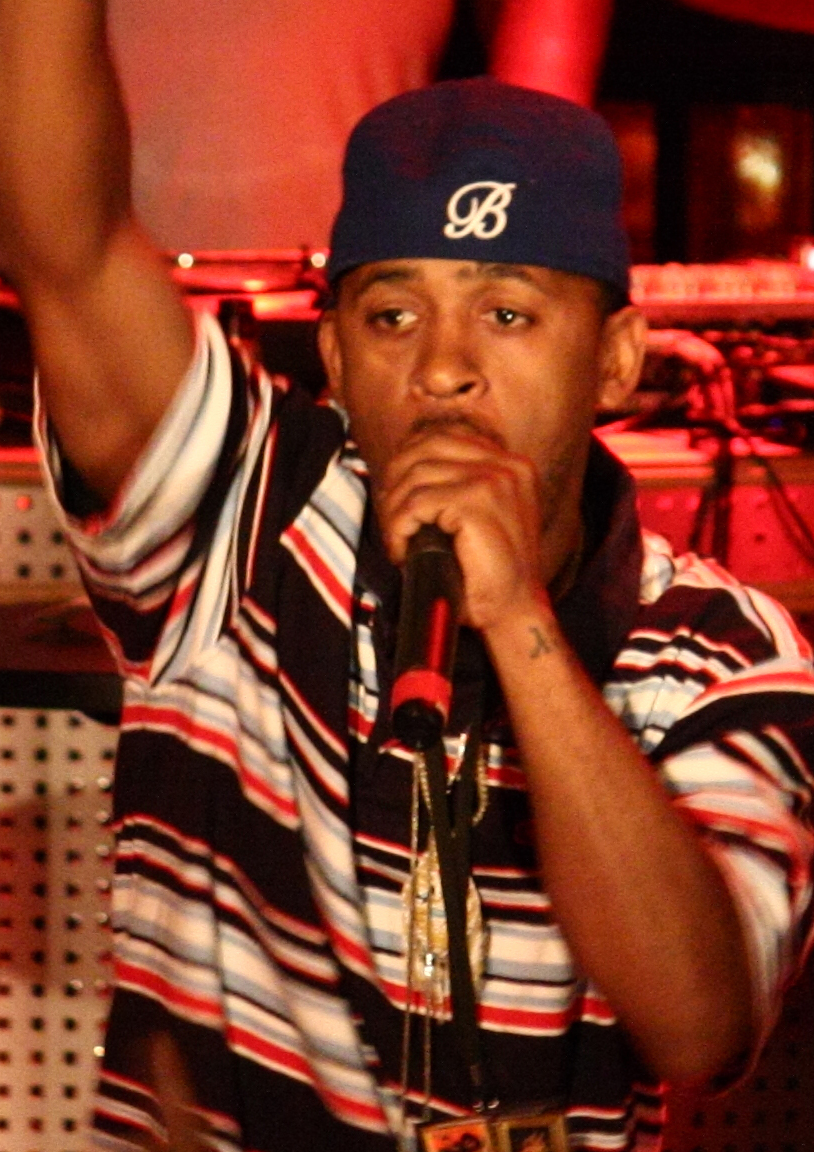
- Buckshot performing in 2009

Background information
- Also known as: Hanif Alwin al-Sadiq; Buckshot Shorty; The BDI Thug (Beady-Eyed Thug)
- Born: Kenyatta Blake; November 19, 1974 (age 51); Brooklyn, New York City, U.S.
- Genres: Hip-hop
- Occupations: Rapper; songwriter; record producer
- Years active: 1992–present
- Labels: Nervous; Duck Down
- Member of: Black Moon; Boot Camp Clik; Crooklyn Dodgers
- Relatives: David Stones (cousin)

Kenyatta Blake (born November 19, 1974), known professionally as Buckshot, is an American rapper from Brooklyn, New York, best known as a frontman of hip-hop groups Black Moon and Boot Camp Clik. He rose to prominence with Black Moon's debut 1993 album Enta da Stage, which is critically acclaimed and influential in hip-hop.

He is a founder of Duck Down Music record label with Drew "Dru-Ha" Friedman. He has released one solo studio album – three with producer 9th Wonder, one with KRS-One, four albums with Black Moon and four albums with the Boot Camp Clik. He is known for his line, "Straight from Crooklyn, better known as Brooklyn" (from Who Got da Props?) which features prominently on two songs by the Crooklyn Dodgers.

== Biography ==
Born and raised in Brooklyn, New York, Buckshot Shorty began rapping in neighborhood rhyming ciphers. In high school, he befriended Karim "5ft" Reid, Ewart "DJ Evil Dee" Dewgarde and Walter "Mr. Walt" Dewgarde, who would evolve into the super production team Da Beatminerz.

In 1992, Blake, Reid and Ewart Dewgarde formed Black Moon. The trio released the single "Who Got Da Props?" in late 1992, which reached number 86 on the Billboard Hot 100 chart, landing them a recording deal with Nervous Records. Later that year, Black Moon released their first full-length album, Enta da Stage to positive critical acclaim. The album featured appearances by Havoc of Mobb Deep, as well as future Boot Camp Clik members Tek and Steele of Smif N Wessun.

In 1994, with Drew "Dru-Ha" Friedman, the two left Nervous Records and formed Duck Down Management. That same year, Blake signed and oversaw the creation of Smif-N-Wessun's debut album Dah Shinin', as well as adding Heltah Skeltah (Rock and Ruck) and Originoo Gunn Clappaz (Starang Wondah, Louieville Sluggah and Top Dog) to Duck Down's roster. During the summer, Blake took part in the collaboration with Masta Ace and Special Ed as the Crooklyn Dodgers, releasing a single by the same name, on the soundtrack of Spike Lee's 1994 film Crooklyn.

Officially titled Duck Down Entaprizez in 1996, Blake, Friedman and Smif-N-Wessun began work with Tupac Shakur on the unreleased studio album One Nation. During this time Blake was dubbed as "The BDI Thug" by 2Pac.

March 1997 marked a milestone in Duck Down history. The collective of:Buckshot, Smif-N-Wessun,, Heltah Skeltah and O.G.C. formed a supergroup the Boot Camp Clik, who released their debut album titled For the People. A remix of "Night Riders" was recorded featuring Aaliyah, but the single was never released, due to conflicts between record labels.

In 1999 Black Moon released their second album War Zone. It was their first full-length album in more than 5 years. Featuring guest appearances from Q-Tip, Busta Rhymes, M.O.P., Heather B. and produced by Da Beatminerz, the album sold over 200,000 units and was met with strong reviews. Blake's solo album, The BDI Thug, was released later that year but to mediocre reviews.

In July 2002, Duck Down ended its two-year search for a new distribution deal, inking a three-year contract with Koch Distribution. Boot Camp Clik released their second full-length album The Chosen Few. The album sold over 60,000 copies, making it one of Duck Down's most successful releases. In 2004 Black Moon returned with Total Eclipse. The album peaked at #47 on the Top R&B/Hip-Hop Albums and ranked #23 for Independent Albums charts.

Blake and North Carolina–based producer 9th Wonder (of Little Brother and Justus League) collaborated to release Chemistry in summer 2005 to positive reviews. This album was a part of Duck Down's 'Triple Threat Campaign', preceded by Sean Price's Monkey Barz and followed by Tek & Steele's Smif 'n' Wessun: Reloaded.

Boot Camp Clik returned in summer 2006 with The Last Stand. With an all-star cast of producers (Pete Rock, Da Beatminerz, 9th Wonder, Large Professor, Marco Polo, Illmind, Coptic, Sic Beats and Ken BB), it was a critical success and marked the return of the entire Boot Camp Clik for the first time in several years. In addition, Black Moon released, Alter The Chemistry, laced with 1970s influenced rhythms and samples it takes a new approach to Chemistry.

In April 2008, Buckshot and 9th Wonder released their sophomore studio album, The Formula. In September same year, Blake was hospitalized after suffering a series of seizures. His business partner, Friedman, said he had just returned from a three-week tour through Europe prior to the episodes. After a short hospitalization, he was released and returned to performing and recording.

Buckshot and KRS-One also released an album together called Survival Skills on September 15, 2009, via Duck Down Records. Its first single "Robot", produced by Havoc, was released on iTunes on May 5, 2009.

During 2010s, Blake has released the third album with 9th Wonder, The Solution (2012), Backpack Travels (2014) with DJ P-Money from New Zealand, and the fourth Black Moon album titled Rise of da Moon (2019), which is his recent project to-date.

== Personal life ==
Blake is a Muslim, and his Muslim name is Ḥanīf aṣ-Ṣiddīq حَنيْف الـصِّدِّيْق. He can also speak Arabic. On November 3, 2024 Blake was reportedly the victim of a recent assault in Flatbush, Brooklyn. This is an ongoing investigation.

== Discography ==
=== Solo albums ===
- The BDI Thug (1999)
- The Package (2026)

=== Collaborative albums ===
- Chemistry (2005) with 9th Wonder
- The Formula (2008) with 9th Wonder
- Survival Skills (2009) with KRS-One
- The Solution (2012) with 9th Wonder
- Backpack Travels (2014) with P-Money

=== Black Moon albums ===
- Enta da Stage (1993)
- War Zone (1999)
- Total Eclipse (2003)
- Rise of da Moon (2019)

=== Boot Camp Clik albums ===
- For the People (1997)
- The Chosen Few (2002)
- The Last Stand (2006)
- Casualties of War (2007)
