= Drew "Dru-Ha" Friedman =

American music promoter

Drew "Dru Ha" Friedman
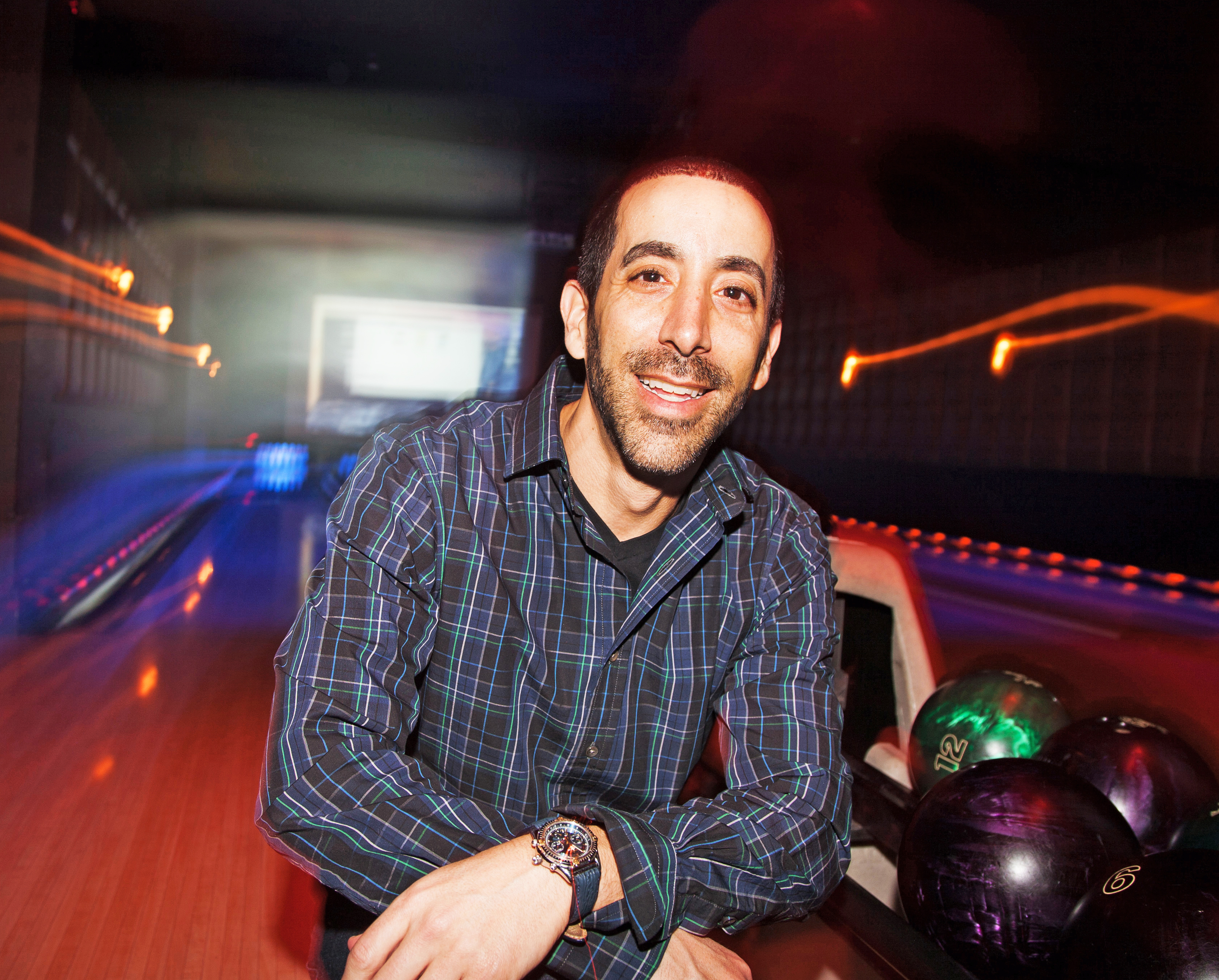
- Known for: Co-Founder & CEO of Duck Down Music Inc. and 3D Consulting & Distribution / Former Director of Urban Music at Cornerstone Promotion

Drew "Dru Ha" Friedman is an American music and marketing executive based in New York City. Friedman is co-founder and CEO of Duck Down Music Inc., 3D Consulting & Distribution, General Manager for Cinematic Music Group, and former Director of Urban Music at Cornerstone Promotion. Born and raised in White Plains, New York, he is a graduate of Syracuse University's S.I. Newhouse School of Public Communications where he studied advertising.

== Background ==
During summer breaks at Syracuse University, Friedman interned at SBK Records under Rob Stone (co-founder Cornerstone Promotion and Fader Media). There Friedman worked College Radio Promotions for multi-platinum acts Vanilla Ice & Arrested Development. Shortly after graduating Syracuse, Friedman began working at independent label Nervous Records where he became head of the company's Hip Hop department. He executive produced projects from Black Moon, Smif-N-Wessun, Funkmaster Flex, and KRS-One's prodigy: Mad Lion. While working as a manager, promoter, and marketer, Friedman was also featured as a guest rapper on Black Moon's Enta Da Stage album on the song "U Da Man" under the name Big Dru Ha.

== Career ==
=== Duck Down Mgmt. and Duck Down Music Inc. ===
In 1994 Friedman along with his partner Kenyatta Blake (Buckshot) formed Duck Down Management to formally manage the groups Black Moon and Smif-N-Wessun. In 1995, Dru & Buckshot founded Duck Down Entaprizes (eventually modifying the name to Duck Down Music Inc.). to which they signed hip hop groups Heltah Skeltah and O.G.C. In 1996 Duck Down signed a deal with Bryan Turner and Priority Records (home to Ice Cube, N.W.A and Master P's No Limit Records) for label distribution.

Late in 1996, Tupac Shakur invited Friedman and his artists, Buckshot and Smif n Wessun to work on the never released One Nation, an album that would attempt to show solidarity between the East and West Coasts. Under Friedman's direction at Priority, Duck Down Artists worked with various Hip Hop Artists including collaborations with Mary J. Blige (Smif N Wessun - "I Love You" RMX), Tupac (BCC - "Better Days"), Method Man (Heltah Skeltah - "Gunz N Onz"), Spike Lee (Buckshot - "Crooklyn Dodgers"), Wyclef (Cocoa Brovaz - "Where's the Party"), and fallen songbird Aaliyah, who recorded "Nightriders" with the Boot Camp Clik. In 1997, Friedman witnessed an unsigned Eminem at a NYC's Lyricist Lounge and attempted to sign Em to Duck Down via parent company Priority Records. Duck Down has sold over 3,000,000 albums which Friedman executive produced.

In 1998, Friedman launched Vision Marketing. The agency provided promotion and cross marketing opportunities for Duck Down Album releases for companies such as Eckō Unltd., Skechers, LRG and others. In 2002, Friedman and Duck Down signed a distribution deal with Koch Records (now E1). Under this deal the label retained full ownership of their Masters, manufactured their own product, and were responsible for all the artists promotion. Friedman negotiated a deal for Duck Down to keep its digital and physical distribution separated, allowing Duck Down to set up a rare direct deal with iTunes for digital distribution.

In 2006, in addition to running Duck Down Music, Friedman accepted a position at Cornerstone Agency as Director of Urban Music. There he has worked on campaigns such as Nike's "Classic (Better Than I've Ever Been)" with Rakim, KRS-One, Nas, and Kanye West. The track was nominated for the Grammy Award for "Best Rap Performance by a Duo or Group." In late 2010, Pepsi retained Cornerstone to handle the creative on the brand's campaign, Pepsi Max NFL Audible. Friedman enlisted the rappers Big Boi, Lupe Fiasco, B.o.B and Talib Kweli for a campaign that included TV spots that aired during the 2011 NFL playoff games.

In 2009, Friedman signed his first global act to Duck Down, New Zealand's Hip-Hop sensation David Dallas. David's second album, The Rose Tint, went on sale in October 2011 and became NZ's highest selling hip hop album for 2011. The Rose Tint was nominated for three New Zealand Music Awards and also shortlisted for the Taite Prize in 2012. Dallas' 2013 single Runnin' was used in the trailer for the video game Madden 25 and also featured in the video game FIFA 14.

In 2010 and 2011, Duck Down partnered with 2K Sports to present a unique opportunity for aspiring producers and MCs. This involved an open call for submissions for original sample-free compositions for a chance to receive placement in the NBA 2K's game soundtrack (NBA 2K11 and NBA 2K12) and a trip to NYC to perform at Duck Down's CMJ Showcase.

In 2011, in addition to releasing Pharoahe Monch's W.A.R. (We Are Renegades) album, Friedman formed 3D, a music-marketing and consulting firm with its own distribution network. 3D provides General Management for Artist-owned indie sub-labels such as Talib Kweli's Javotti Media (Gutter Rainbows) and Blue Scholars. This allowed artists to tap into 3D's expertise, relationships, and networks, while retaining control of their projects and ownerships of their masters. Expanded services from 3D are a Music Supervision Department that places clients' songs in film, TV, and video games, and creation and sales of Artist Merchandising.

=== 2011 ING New York City Marathon ===
On November 6, Friedman participated in the 2011 ING New York City Marathon raising over $15,000 for the Alzheimer's Research Foundation. Friedman's father, Harvey L. Friedman, died from Alzheimer's earlier that year.

2012 saw the releases of Sean Price's highly anticipated Mic Tyson album, Skyzoo's A Dream Deferred, 9th Wonder & Buckshot's 3rd collaborative album, and releases from acts Murs & Fashawn, and De La Soul's Plug 1 * Plug 2, as well as a partnership with DJ Statik Selektah to release the DJ's self-produced albums.

=== 2013–present ===
In 2013, Friedman and 3D were retained as General Manager for Cinematic Music Group, overseeing recording and marketing budgets, artist brand deals, co-op and global distribution, and overall label strategy. Friedman worked closely with Cinematic's Jonny Shipes, assisting with development and releases from the label's roster, which at that time included Joey Bada$$, Pro Era, Big KRIT, G Herbo and Mick Jenkins, as well as handling management duties for DJ and personality Vashtie Kola and hip hop artist T-Pain. In 2019, Cinematic Music Group's roster includes Flipp Dinero, Luh Kel, and Yungeen Ace, among others.

In 2013, while still serving as music director at Cornerstone Agency, Friedman was working on a campaign for Mountain Dew's label Green Label Sounds' and paired Joey Badass and DJ Premier to record the single "Unorthodox". On January 20, 2015, Joey Bada$$ released his debut album B4.Da.$$, which sold 66,000 units in its first week, making it the #1 rap and #1 independent album in the US. Friedman worked with Cinematic and Pro Era Records on global brand deals for Joey Bada$$ with Adidas, American Eagle Outfitters, Calvin Klein and Mountain Dew. In April 2017, Joey released his sophomore album 'A.A.B.A.' with the lead single "Devastated" achieving RIAA Gold certification. In January 2019, Flipp Dinero's "Leave Me Alone" obtained double platinum status, which led to a partnership with DJ Khaled's We the Best Music Group for future releases. Luh Kel's "Wrong" also obtained platinum certification.

In April 2015, Friedman partnered with rising Brooklyn star Young M.A to handle distribution and marketing through his Company 3D. In May 2016, Young M.A released OOOUUU which achieved RIAA certified triple platinum status. "OOOUUU" has over 80 million SoundCloud streams, and 313 million YouTube plays. The record peaked as the #1 record on the Urban Music Charts and #23 on the Rhythmic charts, with over 200,000 spins on radio. Friedman helped secure national brand campaigns for M.A with Beats Headphones, Adidas, Pandora Radio, Metro PCS and Google Pixel 2, Fashion Nova Men, and Iceberg. M.A's 2018 single "PettyWap" achieved gold sales status. In 2019, Young M.A released her debut album "Herstory in the Making", which has sold over 170,000 album equivalents. The lead single, "BIG", has reached over 600,000 single equivalents. M.A also landed a recurring role on USA Network's Mr. Robot.

In September 2017, Drew Friedman, along with his brother Noah Friedman, formed a label and distribution company called 'Rapids'. Partnering with Caroline/Universal Music Group, the venture's first signing is Louisiana's JayDaYoungan. Since his signing, Jay has releases 7 mixtapes which, combined, have surpassed one billion streams. In 2018, Friedman secured a partnership with Atlantic Records to release Jay's future albums.

New additions to the roster include Gutta 100 and Brooklyn's MaxThaDemon.
