= D&D Studios =

Defunct recording studio in New York City

Coordinates: 40.754397°N 73.993341°W

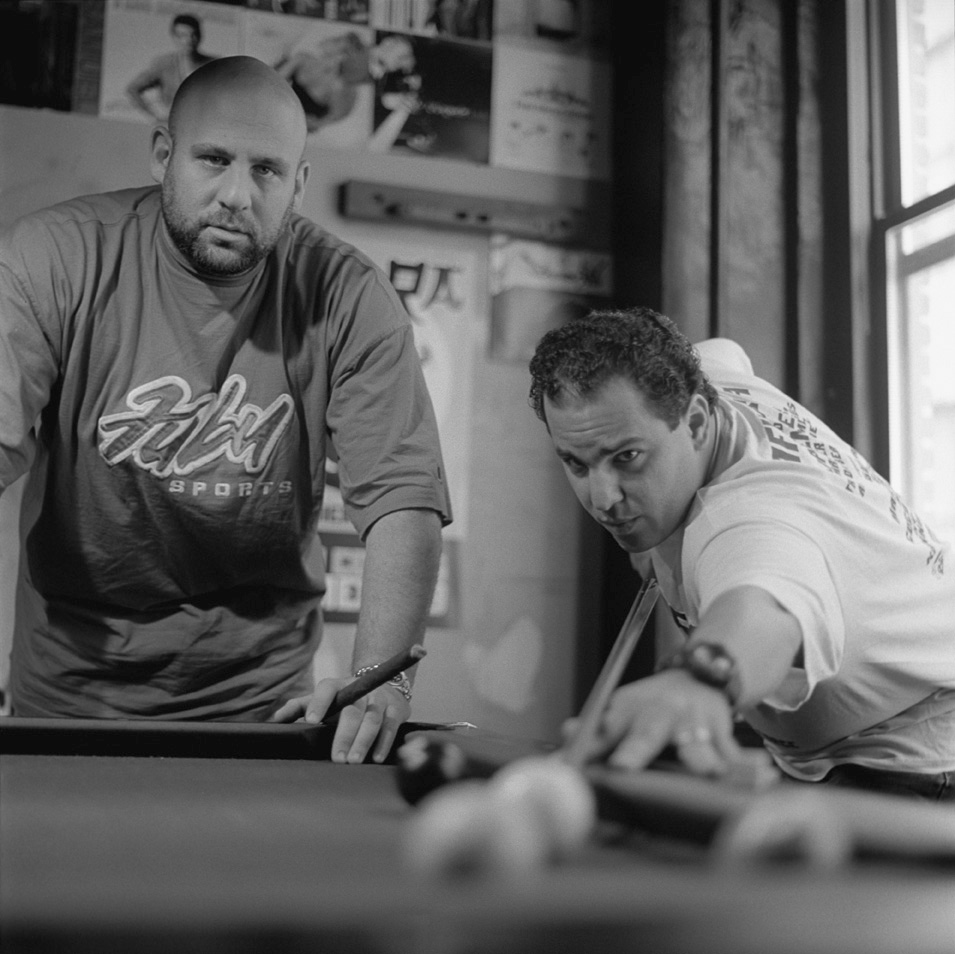
Founders, Douglas Grama and David Lotwin (2000)

D&D Studios was a recording studio at 320 West 37th Street in the Garment District and Hudson Yards neighborhoods of Manhattan in New York City. Artists who recorded there included Jay-Z, Foxy Brown, The Notorious B.I.G., Fat Joe, Nas, Gang Starr, Jeru the Damaja, Afu-Ra, KRS-One, Frankie Cutlass, Violadores del Verso, Big L, and Black Moon.

Founded by Douglas Grama and David Lotwin, D&D Records, which originated at the studios during the 1990s, released albums by Afu-Ra and The D&D All Stars. Other acts on the label included QNC and Mama Mystique. The recording studio managers were Barry Grama, David "Carpi" Carpenter and Paul Twumasi. Singer/songwriter Grayson Hugh recorded much of his 1988 RCA album "Blind To Reason" there, as well as the song "How Bout Us", with singer Betty Wright, for the film True Love (1989 film).

In 2003, one of the most famous D&D studios producers, Gang Starr's DJ Premier, bought D&D from its owners and renamed it HeadQCourterz in honor to his friend Kenneth "HeadQCourterz" Walker who was murdered in 2002. DJ Premier used to host a satellite radio show every Friday night on Sirius/XM radio where he would play his hip hop music. The studio closed on December 31, 2014. DITC Ent. label member G. Fisher recorded his debut single Fish Over Premier and EP God MC here as the last project to be recorded in D&D.

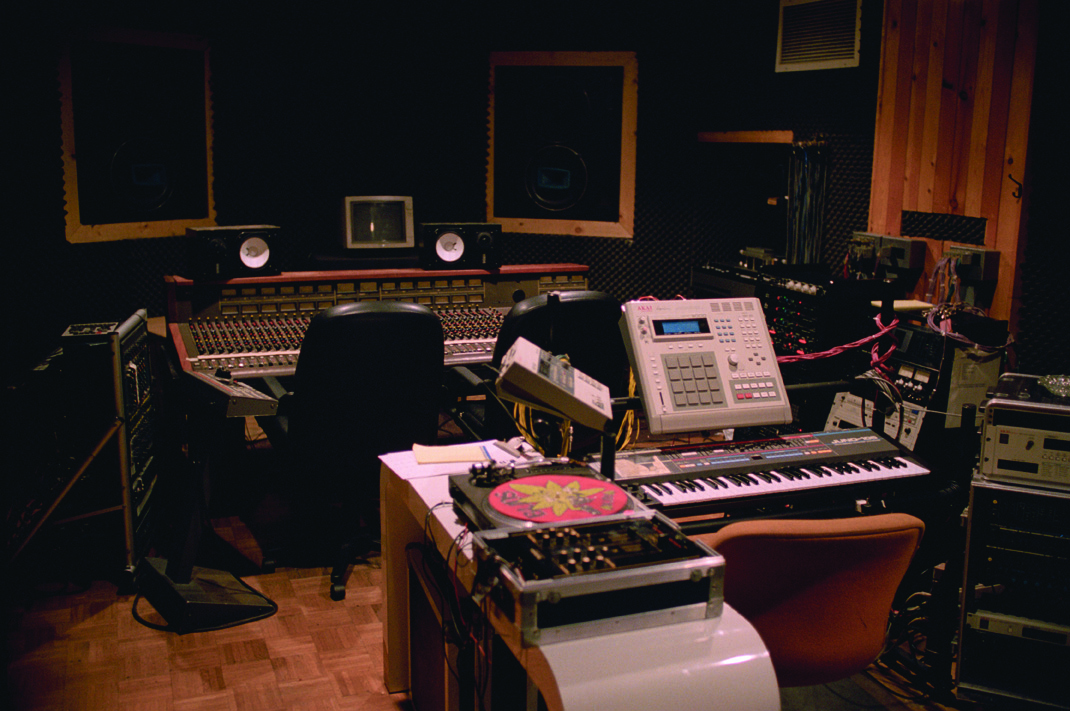
DJ Premier's Studio at D&D

== Albums recorded at D&D ==
- Jay-Z recorded the entire Reasonable Doubt album at D&D, and the album featured production from DJ Premier.
- Fat Joe recorded a portion of Don Cartagena at D&D, and the album featured production from DJ Premier.
- Big L primarily recorded at D&D for his final studio album The Big Picture, and the album received production and executive production from DJ Premier.
- Nas recorded portions of I Am... and Light-Years at D&D, and the album featured production from DJ Premier.
- Smif-N-Wessun recorded the entire Dah Shinin' album at D&D
- Violadores del Verso (Spanish group) recorded the LP GENIOS at D&D in 1999
