= Nervous Records (US) =

American, New York City based record label

- Founded: 1991
- Founder: Sam Weiss; Mike Weiss
- Genre: House; hip hop
- Country of origin: U.S.
- Location: New York City
- Official website: Nervous Records

Nervous Records is an American record label specializing in underground house and hip hop, founded in 1991.

Mike Weiss is co-founder, along with his father, Sam Weiss. Sam Weiss was also the founder and president of the Disco Era imprint, Sam Records. Mike Weiss graduated from Stanford University in 1983 with a BA, Syracuse University Law School in 1986 with a JD, and the Newhouse School of Communications in 1986 with an MFA in Film.

Nervous has released music from many legendary producers in dance music, including Todd Edwards, Masters At Work, Armand Van Helden, Todd Terry, Frankie Knuckles, Kerri Chandler, Louie Vega, youANDme, Harry Romero, and David Morales. Nervous, on its Wreck subsidiary, also released three albums that are considered some of the most essential releases in the hip-hop genre, including "Enta Da Stage" by Black Moon, "Dah Shinin' by Smif-N-Wessun, and "Real Ting" by Mad Lion.

Nervous Records is currently America's longest-standing independent dance music record label, and since 2024 has been releasing between 3 and 5 titles on a weekly basis. The label has enjoyed several Number 1 charting titles on Beatport, the leading digital DJ platform, including Loofy's "Last Night," Mau P's "The Less I Know The Better" and Vinter's "Space Pump (Space Jam)."

The label also is involved in producing nightclub events at many prominent venues around New York, including The Brooklyn Mirage, Superior Ingredients, and Silo. DJ Mag states that the label's cartoon character logo is an iconic record label logo in the music industry.

In 2024, long-standing Nervous Records employee Andrew Salsano was named Vice President of the Label.

Nervous Records President Mike Weiss also currently DJs at many prominent venues under his DJ name Mike Nervous.

== See also ==
- List of record labels
