= Sean Price discography =

- Studio albums: 6
- EPs: 2
- Compilation albums: 2
- Singles: 4
- Video albums: 1
- Official mixtapes: 4

Sean Price, also formerly known as Ruck, was an American hip hop recording artist from Brownsville, Brooklyn. His discography consists of fourteen studio albums, including four solo albums, one collaborative album with Black Milk & Guilty Simpson, one collaborative album with Small Professor, one collaborative album with Lil' Fame, three albums as half of duo Heltah Skeltah, four albums as member of supergroup Boot Camp Clik, as well as two collaborative extended plays (one with M-Phazes and one with Illa Ghee), four official mixtapes, two box sets, one video album, numerous singles, and many guest appearances on other artists' songs.

== Studio albums ==
Title	Album details	Peak chart positions					
Title	Album details	US	US R&B	US Rap	US Indie	US Heat.	US Taste
Monkey Barz	Released: June 13, 2005; Label: Duck Down (DDM 2011); Format: CD, digital download, LP	—	70	—	46	—	—
Jesus Price Supastar	Released: January 30, 2007; Label: Duck Down (DDM 2045); Format: CD, digital download, LP	196	60	—	16	3	—
Random Axe (with Black Milk and Guilty Simpson)	Released: June 14, 2011; Label: Duck Down (DDM 2185); Format: CD, digital download, LP	83	15	9	13	—	—
Mic Tyson	Released: October 30, 2012; Label: Duck Down (DDM 2230); Format: CD, digital download, LP	59	9	7	10	—	22
Imperius Rex	Released: August 8, 2017; Label: Duck Down (DDM 2525); Format: CD, digital download, LP	192	—	—	8	—	—
86 Witness (with Small Professor)	Released: February 8, 2019; Label: Duck Down (DDM 2795); Format: CD, digital download, LP	—	—	—	—	—	—
Price of Fame (with Lil' Fame)	Released: December 20, 2019; Label: Duck Down (DDM 2990); Format: CD, digital download, LP	—	—	—	43	—	—

== Extended plays ==
List of extended plays, showing year released
Title	Details
Land of the Crooks (with M-Phazes)	Released: December 17, 2013; Label: Coalmine (CM 055); Format: Digital download, EP
Metal Detectors (with Illa Ghee)	Released: March 16, 2018; Label: Duck Down (DDM 2645); Format: Digital download, EP

== Official mixtapes ==
List of mixtape albums, with selected chart positions
Title	Album details	Peak chart positions			
Title	Album details	US R&B	US Rap	US Indie	BEL (FL)
Donkey Sean Jr. (hosted by P.F. Cuttin')	Released: 2004; Label: Bucktown USA Ent. (BTU 4001); Format: Cassette, CD, digital download	—	—	—	—
Master P	Released: July 20, 2007; Label: Bucktown USA Ent. (BTU 5004); Format: CD, digital download	—	—	—	—
Kimbo Price	Released: October 23, 2009; Label: Bucktown USA Ent. (BTU 5009); Format: CD, digital download	—	—	—	—
Songs in the Key of Price	Released: August 21, 2015; Label: Duck Down (DDM 2450); Format: CD, digital download, LP	15	10	19	194

=== Bootlegs ===
List of video albums, showing year released
Title	Details
Rising to the Top (with Agallah)	Released: January 1, 2010; Format: CD, digital download
Grown Man Rap (with J-Love)	Released: 2011; Format: CDr, digital download

== Box sets ==
List of box sets, showing year released
Title	Details
Gorilla	Released: November 25, 2016; Label: Duck Down (DDM 2460); Format: CD, LP
RIP (1972 - 2015)	Released: October 12, 2019; Label: Duck Down (DDM 2750); Format: Cassette

== Video albums ==
List of video albums, showing year released
Title	Details
Passion of Price	Released: September 13, 2005; Label: Duck Down; Format: DVD

== Group albums ==
=== Heltah Skeltah ===
List of Heltah Skeltah studio albums, with selected details and chart positions
Title	Album details	Peak chart positions			
Title	Album details	US	US R&B/HH	US Rap	US Indie
Nocturnal	Released: June 18, 1996; Label: Priority (50532); Format: Cassette, CD, LP	35	5	—	—
Magnum Force	Released: October 13, 1998; Label: Priority (53543); Format: Cassette, CD, LP	34	8	—	—
D.I.R.T. (Da Incredible Rap Team)	Released: September 30, 2008; Label: Duck Down (DDM 2080); Format: CD, LP	122	35	18	21

=== Boot Camp Clik ===
List of Boot Camp Clik studio albums, showing year released
Title	Details
For the People	Released: May 20, 1997; Label: Priority (50646); Format: Cassette, CD, LP
The Chosen Few	Released: October 8, 2002; Label: Duck Down (DDM 2000); Format: CD, LP
The Last Stand	Released: July 18, 2006; Label: Duck Down (DDM 2035); Format: CD, LP
Casualties of War	Released: August 14, 2007; Label: Duck Down (DDM 2055); Format: CD, LP

== Singles ==
List of charted singles as lead artist, with selected chart positions
Title	Year	Peak chart positions	Album
Title	Year	US R&B Sales	Album
"Boom Bye Yeah"	2004	68	Monkey Barz
"P-Body"	2007	—	Jesus Price Supastar
"How the Gods Chill" (with Cold World)	2011	—	—
"STFU, Part 2"	2012	—	Mic Tyson

== Guest appearances ==
List of non-single guest appearances, with other performing artists, showing year released and album name
Title	Year	Other artist(s)	Album
"Uni-4-Orm"	1997	Canibus, Ras Kass	Rhyme & Reason (soundtrack)
"Myah Angelow"	1998	Cocoa Brovaz	The Rude Awakening
"Ultimate Rush"	1999	Saukrates	The Underground Tapes
"Live the Life"	1999	Ruste Juxx	Duck Down Presents: The Album
"No Chance (Vince McMahon Theme)"	2000	Peanut Butter Wolf, Redman	WWF Aggression
"Blood Runs Cold"	2000	Jedi Mind Tricks	Violent by Design
"No No No"	2000	Tony Touch, Starang Wondah	The Piece Maker
"All Time Greats"	2001	KC Da Rookee	Nexcalibur
"Irrationally Speaking"	2002	Domingo, Deacon the Villain	The Difference Vol. 1
"Warzone"	2002	DJ Desue, D-Flame	Art of War
"Come on Now"	2003	Mr. Eon	Nature Sounds Presents... The Prof in Convexed
"Lookin' Down the Barrel"	2003	Black Moon	Total Eclipse
"What Would U Do?"	2003	Black Moon	Total Eclipse
"Beyond the Gates of Pain"	2004	Jedi Mind Tricks	Legacy of Blood
"U Wonderin"	2005	Buckshot	Chemistry
"Get Back"	2005	Smif-N-Wessun	Smif 'n' Wessun: Reloaded
"My TImbz Do Work"	2005	Smif-N-Wessun	Smif 'n' Wessun: Reloaded
"You Ain't a Killer"	2005	Show, A.G., Party Arty	Show Business
"Fair One"	2005	Reef the Lost Cauze	Feast or Famine
"5th Chamber"	2006	Bronze Nazareth, Prodigal Sunn, 12 O'Clock	The Great Migration
"One of the Best"	2007	Tommy Tee	No Studio No Time (The Wait)
"Legbreakers"	2007	Big Shug, Infamous Mobb	Street Champ
"Automatic"	2007	Brad Strut	Legend: Official
"Gunz"	2007	Snowgoons	German Lugers
"The Matrix"	2008	Black Milk	Tronic
"The Unexpected"	2008	DJ Babu, MF Doom	DJ Babu Presents: Duck Season, Vol. 3
"Pledge"	2008	Kids in the Hall, Buckshot	The In Crowd
"Haha Da Rah Rah"	2008	Tame One & Parallel Thought	Da Ol' Jersey Bastard
"Submission"	2008	Chaundon, Skyzoo	Carnage
"Git Sum"	2008	eMC	The Show
"Submission"	Chaundon, Skyzoo	Carnage	
"Run"	Guilty Simpson	Ode to the Ghetto	
"Streets"	2009	CunninLynguists	Strange Journey Volume Two
"Amazin"	2009	KRS-One, Buckshot	Survival Skills
"D.R.E.A.M."	2009	DJ Honda	IV
"Hey Young World"	2009	Snowgoons	The Trojan Horse
"At War"	2009	Snowgoons	A Fist in the Thought
"Radiant Jewels"	2009	Wu-Tang Clan	Wu-Tang Chamber Music
"Hold Up"	2009	Torae, Marco Polo	Double Barrel
"Persuasion"	2010	JR & PH7	The Update
"Fuckin Wit a Gangsta"	2010	Marco Polo, Ruste Juxx	The eXXecution
"Critically Acclaimed"	2010	Statik Selektah	100 Proof: The Hangover
"The Burn Notice"	2010	Skyzoo & Illmind, Heltah Skeltah	Live from the Tape Deck
"Trouble Shooters"	2010	Ill Bill, Sick Jacken, O.C.	Kill Devil Hills
"Heat Rock"	2010	Redlight Boogie	Dirty Money Clean Hands
"Snow"	2010	Roc Marciano	Marcberg
"Struggle No More"	2011	Apollo the Great	Apollo 21 (Deluxe Edition)
"Psychosis"	2011	Dope D.O.D.	Branded
"How the Gods Chill"	2011	Cold World	How the Gods Chill
"Bar-Barian"	2011	New Yitty	—N/a
"No Fear"	2011	Black Rob, Buckshot	Game Tested, Streets Approved
"Population Control"	2011	Statik Selektah	Population Control
"That's Hard"	2011	Smif-n-Wessun, Pete Rock	Monumental
"Palookas"	2011	Talib Kweli	Gutter Rainbows
"Laced Cheeba"	2011	Wu-Tang Clan	Legendary Weapons
"Until It's All Said And Done"	2012	JR & PH7, Skyzoo	The Good Life
"Electronic Funeral"	2012	La Coka Nostra	Masters of the Dark Arts
"Grime"	2012	Fatt Father, Guilty Simpson, Roc Marciano	Fatherhood
"Whiskybars"	2012	Mistah Nice	—N/a
"World Famous"	2012	P.F. Cuttin & Labba	Blunts Bongs Bitches
"Get Off The Ground"	2012	Snowgoons	Snowgoons Dynasty
"Some Bullsh!t"	2012	Double A.B. & Dub Sonata, Scram Jones	Media Shower
"Hypnosis"	2012	Timeless Truth	Rock-It Science
"Pussy Clot"	2012	Afu-Ra, Sadat X	Body of the Lifeforce 2
"Bars & Hooks"	2012	AWKWORD	World View
"Grown Man Palletes"	2012	Mayhem Lauren	
"New Type of Something"	2012	Truth	From Ashes to Kingdom Come
"Blood of the Goat"	2012	Action Bronson, The Alchemist, Big Twin	Rare Chandeliers
"Fuck Ya Mother"	2012	Smoke DZA	Rugby Thompson
"Magic Spaceship"	2013	Beedie, B. White, Git Beats	Basement Ghost
"Ash 'n' Dust"	2013	Dope D.O.D.	Da Roach
"Bang Exclusive"	2013	Kid Tsunami	The Chase
"Wise Men"	2013	Napoleon Da Legend	Awakening
"21 & Over"	2013	Statik Selektah, Mac Miller	Extended Play
"NY Giants"	2013	The White Shadow	Nightmare Concert
"Tunnel Vision"	2013	Bobby Capri	Instant Gratification
"Dead Price"	2014	Zeds Dead	Somewhere Else
"We Don't Fuckin' Care"	2014	Onyx & Snowgoons	Wakedafucup
"Drink Irish"	2014	Apollo Brown, SLaine, Sick Jacken	Blasphemy
"Game Time"	2014	Diabolic	Fightin' Words
"All in Together"	2014	Skyzoo, Torae, Guilty Simpson	Barrel Brothers
"The Wild Bunch"	2014	A Villa, Oh No, Roc Marciano	Carry on Tradition
"Scum"	2014	Black Milk, Guilty Simpson	If There's a Hell Below
"Delirium"	2014	Willie the Kid, Sha Stimuli	The Living Daylights
"Mistreated"	2014	Stone Bench	Stone Bench
"Nemam ti kad"	2014	Who See	Nemam ti kad
"Hometown"	2014	Popek	—N/a
"Crazy Dope"	2015	DJ EFN, Milk Dee, Murda Mook	Another Time
"Blink Away"	2015	Kydd Jones	—N/a
"We Don't Play"	2015	Aim, QNC, Grand Puba	The Habit of a Lifetime and How to Kick It
"Top Tier"	2015	Statik Selektah, Bun B, Styles P	Lucky 7
"Don’t Drink The Kool-Aid"	2015	Fortunato	Blue Collar
"BLVK TAR"	2015	Westside Gunn	HWH3
"Sheet Music"	2015	Gangrene, Havoc	You Disgust Me
"Yesman Shit"	2015	Apollo Brown, Reks	Grandeur
"Get Off the Ground" (DJ Premier Remix)	2015	Termanology, Lil' Fame, Ruste Juxx, Justin Tyme, Hannibal Stex, Papoose, Reks	Term Brady
"Holy Mountain"	2015	William Cooper, Stoneface	God's Will
"B.Q.P."	2015	MoSS, Peedi Crakk, Royal Flush, Illa Ghee	Marching to the Sound of My Own Drum
"Venom"	2016	Bruse Wane, Chris Rivers	The Earl Manigault Of RAP
"The Underworld 2"	2016	Havoc, Kid Fade, Johnny Richter, Kool G Rap, Chino XL, Slaine, Necro, Ruste Juxx, Kuniva, Sabac Red, Ill Bill, DJ Illegal	The Underworld 2
"Popped Off"	2017	Kool G Rap, Ransom	Return of the Don
"Down With Me"	2017	Masta Killa	Loyalty Is Royalty
"Pearl Harbor"	2017	Wu-Tang Clan	The Saga Continues
"Go Gettas"	2017	Statik Selektah, Tek, Wais P	8
"Aquatic Violence"	2017	DJ Muggs, Mayhem Lauren, Mr. Mothafuckin Xquire	Gems from the Equinox
"Ralph Lauren's Closet"	2020	Statik Selektah, Thirstin Howl	The Balancing Act
"Distorted Views"	2024	Vic Spencer	The Apes That Was Left Behind
All Time Great	2025	Smif n Wessun	Infinity
"Legacy of the Prophet"	2018	Jedi Mind Tricks	The Bridge and the Abyss
