= 1999 in hip-hop =

This article summarizes the events, album releases, and album release dates in hip-hop for the year 1999.

== Released albums ==
Release Date	Artist	Album
January 12	Keith Murray	It's a Beautiful Thing
January 12	Visionaries	Sophomore Jinx
January 19	Peanut Butter Wolf	My Vinyl Weighs a Ton
January 19	Silkk the Shocker	Made Man
January 26	Foxy Brown	Chyna Doll
February 2	Tear Da Club Up Thugs	CrazyNDaLazDayz
February 9	Defari	Focused Daily
February 9	MC Breed	It's All Good
February 16	Mr. Serv-On	Da Next Level
February 18	Various Artists	Office Space (soundtrack)
February 23	Various Artists	The Corruptor (soundtrack)
February 23	A+	Hempstead High
February 23	Black Moon	War Zone
February 23	Eminem	The Slim Shady LP
February 23	Prince Paul	A Prince Among Thieves
February 23	The Roots	Things Fall Apart
February 23	Vanilla Ice	The Best of Vanilla Ice
March 2	Esham	Mail Dominance
March 2	Three 6 Mafia	Underground Vol. 1: (1991-1994)
March 9	C-Bo	The Final Chapter
March 9	C-Murder	Bossalinie
March 9	E.S.G.	Shinin' n' Grindin'
March 9	Harlem World	The Movement
March 9	Naughty by Nature	Nature's Finest: Naughty by Nature's Greatest Hits
March 16	Infamous Syndicate	Changing the Game
March 16	Various Artists	Life (soundtrack)
March 23	Domingo	Behind the Doors of the 13th Floor
March 23	N.W.A	The N.W.A Legacy, Vol. 1: 1988-1998
March 23	Various Artists	Foolish soundtrack
March 23	Road Dawgs	Don't Be Saprize
March 23	Wu-Tang Clan	Wu-Chronicles
April 6	Krayzie Bone	Thug Mentality 1999
April 6	Lords of the Underground	Resurrection
April 6	Nas	I Am...
April 20	B.G.	Chopper City In the Ghetto
April 20	Crooked Lettaz	Grey Skies
April 20	T.W.D.Y.	Derty Werk
April 20	Wu-Syndicate	Wu-Syndicate
April 27	Lil Soldiers	Boot Camp
April 27	Ruff Ryders	Ryde or Die Vol. 1
April 27	Naughty by Nature	Nineteen Naughty Nine: Nature's Fury
April 30	Blackalicious	A2G EP
May 4	Death Row Records	Suge Knight Represents: Chronic 2000
May 4	Kool Keith	First Come, First Served
May 11	Snoop Dogg	No Limit Top Dogg
May 18	Rawkus Records	Soundbombing II
May 18	Celly Cel	The Best of Celly Cel
May 18	Eightball & MJG	In Our Lifetime, Vol. 1
May 18	GRITS	Grammatical Revolution
May 25	Slick Rick	The Art of Storytelling
May 25	No Limit Records	Who U Wit?
May 31	Swollen Members	Balance
June 1	Group Home	A Tear for the Ghetto
June 1	Ja Rule	Venni Vetti Vecci
June 1	TRU	Da Crime Family
June 8	MC Eiht	Section 8
June 14	DJ Spinna	Heavy Beats Vol. 1
June 15	Various Artists	Wild Wild West (soundtrack)
June 15	Company Flow	Little Johnny from the Hospital: Breaks & Instrumentals Vol. 1
June 15	Mase	Double Up
June 15	Sporty Thievz	Street Cinema
June 21	Kutmasta Kurt	Masters of Illusion EP
June 22	Missy "Misdemeanor" Elliott	Da Real World
June 22	RZA	The RZA Hits
June 22	Saukrates	The Underground Tapes
June 22	Shyheim	Manchild
June 27	Quannum	Spectrum
June 29	GZA	Beneath the Surface
June 29	Lootpack	Soundpieces: Da Antidote!
June 29	The WhoRidas	High Times
July 6	Fiend	Street Life
July 6	Kreators	No Contest
July 6	The Sugarhill Gang	Jump on It!
July 13	Gang Starr	Full Clip: A Decade of Gang Starr
July 13	Various Artists	The Wood (soundtrack)
July 13	Lil' Cease	The Wonderful World of Cease A Leo
July 13	Lil' Keke	It Was All a Dream
July 13	Too Short	Can't Stay Away
July 20	EPMD	Out of Business
July 20	Public Enemy	There's a Poison Goin' On
July 20	The Roots	The Legendary
July 20	Various Artists	Whiteboys (soundtrack)
July 27	Hot Boy$	Guerrilla Warfare
July 27	Various Artists	Deep Blue Sea (soundtrack)
August 3	Charli Baltimore	Cold as Ice
August 3	Lil Italy	On Top of da World
August 3	Memphis Bleek	Coming of Age
August 10	The Beatnuts	A Musical Massacre
August 10	Kool Keith	Black Elvis/Lost in Space
August 10	Rahzel	Make the Music 2000
August 10	Various Artists	Violator: The Album
August 17	Ludacris	Incognegro
August 17	Mobb Deep	Murda Muzik
August 17	Various Artists	In Too Deep (soundtrack)
August 17	Various Artists	The Source Hip Hop Music Awards 1999
August 24	Arsonists	As the World Burns
August 24	Beastie Boys	Scientists of Sound (The Blow Up Factor Vol. 1)
August 24	The High & Mighty	Home Field Advantage
August 24	Mack 10	Hoo-Bangin': The Mix Tape, Vol. 1
August 24	Noreaga	Melvin Flynt - Da Hustler
August 24	Puff Daddy	Forever
August 24	Three 6 Mafia	Underground Vol. 2: Club Memphis
August 30	Blackalicious	Nia
August 31	CJ Mac	Platinum Game
August 31	Lexicon	Antiquity
August 31	Magic	Thuggin'
August 31	O.G.C.	The M-Pire Shrikez Back
August 31	Various Artists	Blue Streak (soundtrack)
September 7	Jeru the Damaja	Heroz4Hire
September 7	Mr. Mike	Rhapsody
September 14	Duck Down Records	Duck Down Presents: The Album
September 14	Eve	Let There Be Eve...Ruff Ryders' First Lady
September 14	Ol' Dirty Bastard	Nigga Please
September 14	Project Pat	Ghetty Green
September 14	DJ Vadim	U.S.S.R. Life from the Other Side
September 21	A.G.	The Dirty Version
September 21	The Madd Rapper	Tell 'Em Why U Madd
September 21	Terror Squad	The Album
September 28	The Lost Boyz	LB IV Life
September 28	Mac	World War III
September 28	Mac Dre	Rapper Gone Bad
September 28	Method Man & Redman	Blackout!
October 5	Inspectah Deck	Uncontrolled Substance
October 5	Various Artists	Thicker than Water soundtrack
October 11	Aim	Cold Water Music
October 12	Chilldrin of da Ghetto	Chilldrin of da Ghetto
October 12	Ice-T	The Seventh Deadly Sin
October 12	Mos Def	Black on Both Sides
October 12	Warren G	I Want It All
October 12	Busdriver	Memoirs of the Elephant Man
October 12	Spice 1	Immortalized
October 19	Handsome Boy Modeling School	So... How's Your Girl?
October 19	Living Legends	UHB IV: Stop & Retaliate
October 19	MF Doom	Operation: Doomsday
October 19	Pharoahe Monch	Internal Affairs
October 19	Representativz	Representativz
October 19	U-God	Golden Arms Redemption
October 26	Above the Law	Forever Rich Thugs
October 26	A Tribe Called Quest	The Anthology
October 26	Buckshot	The BDI Thug
October 26	Koopsta Knicca	Da Devil's Playground
October 26	Master P	Only God Can Judge Me
October 26	Natas	WicketWorldWide.COM
November 2	Lil Wayne	Tha Block Is Hot
November 2	The Roots	The Roots Come Alive
November 2	Tash	Rap Life
November 2	Various Artists	MTV: The First 1000 Years: Hip Hop
November 9	Beat Junkies	World Famous Beat Junkies Vol. 3
November 9	E-40	Charlie Hustle: The Blueprint of a Self-Made Millionaire
November 9	Sick Wid It Records	Sick Wid It's Greatest Hits
November 9	Tech N9ne	The Calm Before the Storm
November 9	Various Artists	Light It Up (soundtrack)
November 16	Dr. Dre	2001
November 16	Kurupt	Tha Streetz Iz a Mutha
November 16	Raekwon	Immobilarity
November 16	Will Smith	Willennium
November 23	Akinyele	Aktapuss
November 23	Beastie Boys	Beastie Boys Anthology: The Sounds of Science
November 23	MC Breed	2 for the Show
November 23	Nas	Nastradamus
November 30	Q-Tip	Amplified
November 30	Rakim	The Master
November 30	Sisqo	Unleash the Dragon
November 30	Various Artists	The Source Presents: Hip Hop Hits, Vol. 3
December 7	Cypress Hill	Los Grandes Éxitos en Español
December 7	Funkmaster Flex	The Tunnel
December 7	The Notorious B.I.G.	Born Again
December 14	Juvenile	Tha G-Code
December 14	Various Artists	Next Friday soundtrack
December 21	DMX	...And Then There Was X
December 21	Goodie Mob	World Party
December 21	2Pac + Outlawz	Still I Rise
December 28	Jay-Z	Vol. 3... Life and Times of S. Carter
Unknown	One Gud Cide	Contradictions
Unknown	Unspoken Heard	Jamboree (EP)

== Highest-charting singles ==
Hip hop singles from any year which charted in the 1999 Top 40 of the Billboard Hot 100
Song	Artist	Project	Peak position
"Wild Wild West"	Will Smith featuring Dru Hill & Kool Moe Dee	Wild Wild West (soundtrack) & Willennium	1
"What's It Gonna Be?!"	Busta Rhymes featuring Janet Jackson	Extinction Level Event: The Final World Front	3
"Jamboree"	Naughty By Nature featuring Zhané	Nineteen Naughty Nine: Nature's Fury	10
"Ghetto Cowboy"	Mo Thugs Family featuring Bone Thugs-N-Harmony	Chapter II: Family Reunion	15
"Hard Knock Life (Ghetto Anthem)"	Jay-Z	Vol. 2... Hard Knock Life	15
"Can I Get A..."	Jay-Z featuring Amil & Ja Rule	Vol. 2... Hard Knock Life	19
"Back That Thang Up"	Juvenile featuring Mannie Fresh & Lil Wayne	400 Degreez	19
"I Want It All"	Warren G featuring Mack 10	I Want It All	23
"Pushin' Weight"	Ice Cube featuring Mr. Short Khop	War & Peace Vol. 1 (The War Disc)	26
"Vivrant Thing"	Q-Tip	Amplified	26
"Jigga My Nigga"	Jay-Z	Ryde or Die Vol. 1	28
"Changes"	2Pac featuring Talent	Greatest Hits	32
"Got Your Money"	Ol' Dirty Bastard featuring Kelis	Nigga Please	33
"Everything Is Everything"	Lauryn Hill	The Miseducation of Lauryn Hill	35
"My Name Is"	Eminem	The Slim Shady LP	36
"Bling Bling"	B.G. featuring Big Tymers & Hot Boys	Chopper City in the Ghetto	39
"You Got Me"	The Roots featuring Erykah Badu & Eve	Things Fall Apart	39

== Highest first-week sales ==
List of top ten albums with the highest first-week
Number	Album	Artist	1st-week sales	1st-week position
1	...And Then There Was X	DMX	698,000	1
2	2001	Dr. Dre	516,000	2
3	Born Again	The Notorious B.I.G.	485,000	1
4	I Am...	Nas	470,000	1
5	Vol. 3... Life and Times of S. Carter	Jay-Z	462,000	1
6	Still I Rise	2Pac + Outlawz	408,000	7
7	Tha G-Code	Juvenile	290,000	10
8	The Slim Shady LP	Eminem	283,000	2
9	Blackout!	Method Man & Redman	254,000	3
10	Made Man	Silkk the Shocker	240,000	1

== See also ==
- Last article: 1998 in hip hop music
- Next article: 2000 in hip hop music
