= Duck Down Presents: The Album =

Compilation album by Duck Down Records
- Released: September 14, 1999
- Studio: D&D (New York City); The Enterprize (New York City); The Spanish Coop (Los Angeles); Unique (New York City)
- Genre: Hip hop
- Length: 1:02:51
- Label: Priority; P2 50117
- Producer: Drew "Dru-Ha" Friedman (exec.); Steele (exec.); Buckshot (also exec.); Arkatech Beatz; Biggest Gord; Boogie Brown; Da Beatminerz; DJ Megahurtz; Don J; Eek-A-Mouse; Jahdan Blakkamoore; Justin Trugman; Meouphlese; Mike Caren; NOD; Rob; Shaleek

Duck Down Music chronology
The M-Pire Shrikez Back (1999)	Duck Down Presents: The Album (1999)	Angels of Death (1999)

Professional ratings
Review scores
Source	Rating
AllMusic	2.5/5 stars

Duck Down Presents: The Album is a compilation album by American New York–based hip hop record label Duck Down Records featured all new tracks recorded from Boot Camp Clik members and affiliates. It was released on September 14, 1999, via Priority Records. Recording sessions took place at D&D Studios, the Enterprize Studio and Unique Recording Studios in New York, and at the Spanish Coop in Los Angeles. Production was handled by Da Beatminerz, Arkatech Beatz, Buckshot, Eek-A-Mouse and Mike Caren among others. The album received very mediocre reviews. Black Moon's single "Jump Up" peaked at number 24 on the Hot Rap Songs.

== Track listing ==
No.	Title	Producer(s)	Length
1.	"Jump Up" (performed by Black Moon)	Da Beatminerz	3:31
2.	"Holocaust" (performed by Cocoa Brovaz)	Baby Paul	4:47
3.	"Ultimate MC" (performed by Heltah Skeltah and Saukrates)	Mike Caren	3:00
4.	"Real Nigga Shit" (performed by Originoo Gunn Clappaz and Doc Holiday)	Justin "JT" Trugman	3:33
5.	"Meditation" (performed by the Representativz)	Shaleek	3:31
6.	"Eye of the Scorpio" (performed by Buckshot and Rock)	Da Beatminerz	4:52
7.	"BQE" (performed by M.S. and Hairy Balls)	Don J	3:48
8.	"Live the Life" (performed by Ruste Juxx and Sean Price)	NOD	2:57
9.	"Sleepers" (performed by Illa Noyz)	The Infinite Arkatechz	3:53
10.	"Wanted" (performed by Eek-A-Mouse and Steele)	Meouphlese; Eek-A-Mouse	5:56
11.	"Raiders of the Arc" (performed by Jahdan Blakkamoore)	Jahdan Blakkamoore; Biggest Gord	4:08
12.	"Worldwind (Remix)" (performed by Black Moon)	Baby Paul	5:11
13.	"Playin' 4 Keeps" (performed by The B.T.J.'s)	Rob	4:35
14.	"Duck Down" (performed by Heltah Skeltah, Lord Digga, Cocoa Brovaz and Smack Man)	DJ Megahurtz	4:45
15.	"You Can't Fuck With Us" (performed by Buckshot, Steele and BJ Swan)	Mark "Boogie" Brown; Buckshot	4:24
Total length:			1:02:51
