= Casualties of War (album) =

Studio album by Boot Camp Clik
- Released: August 14, 2007
- Studio: CDR Studio'z (New York, NY)
- Genre: Hip-hop
- Length: 45:29
- Label: Duck Down
- Producer: Buckshot (exec.); Drew "Dru-Ha" Friedman (exec.); 9th Wonder; Chris the Four; Dan the Man; Dub.Z; Eric "Coptic" Matlock; Fred Bear; Jaywan Inc.; Marco Polo; Marvel da Beat Bandit; Moods and Vibrations; Nottz; Soul G

Boot Camp Clik chronology
The Last Stand (2006)	Casualties of War (2007)

Professional ratings
Review scores
Source	Rating
AllMusic	3.5/5 stars
HipHopDX	3.5/5
RapReviews	7.5/10
XXL	L

Casualties of War is the fourth studio album by American hip-hop supergroup Boot Camp Clik. It was released on August 14, 2007, through Duck Down Music, and is compiled of leftover tracks recorded for the group's previous album, 2006's The Last Stand. Recording sessions took place at CDR Studio'z in New York. Production was handled by Coptic, Dan the Man, Soul G, Marco Polo, 9th Wonder, Chris the Four, Dub Z, Fred Bear, Jaywan Inc., Marvel da Beat Bandit, Moods and Vibrations Prod. and Nottz, with Buckshot and Drew "Dru-Ha" Friedman serving as executive producers. The album features contributions from seven of the eight original members with O.G.C.'s Louieville Sluggah being the only absent member, as well as guest appearances from Ruste Juxx, Supreme, 5ft, Blue Flame and G-Tang.

== Track listing ==
No.	Title	Writer(s)	Producer(s)	Length
1.	"Intro" (featuring G-Tang)	N. Friedman; D. Humiston	Dan The Man	1:05
2.	"The Hustle"	D. Yates Jr.; K. Blake; T. Williams; E. Matlock	Coptic; Soul G	3:20
3.	"Bubblin Up"	K. Blake; D. Yates Jr.; J. Bush; T. Williams; D. Lamb	Nottz	4:18
4.	"What You See"	S. Price; K. Blake; T. Williams; J. McNair; D. Humiston; F. Levy	Dan The Man; Fred Bear	3:47
5.	"BK All Day" (featuring Ruste Juxx and 5ft)	V. Evans; K. Blake; T. Williams; D. Yates Jr.; S. Price; D. Humiston; C. Brown	Dan The Man; Chris The Four	5:01
6.	"My World"	T. Williams; K. Blake; D. Yates Jr.; M. Bruno	Marco Polo	3:22
7.	"I Need More" (featuring Supreme)	K. Blake; D. Muniz; S. Price; D. Yates Jr.; P. Douthit	9th Wonder	2:41
8.	"Jail Song"	T. Williams; S. Price; D. Yates Jr.; K. Blake; J. Zeglis	Jaywan Inc.	2:41
9.	"A-Yo" (featuring Blue Flame)	T. Williams; K. Blake; A. Green; E. Matlock	Coptic; Soul G	3:32
10.	"Casualties of War" (featuring Ruste Juxx)	T. Williams; K. Blake; V. Evans; D. Yates Jr.; B. Stefanic	Marvel Da Beat Bandit	2:53
11.	"I Want Mine" (featuring Supreme)	K. Blake; J. Bush; D. Yates Jr.; D. Muniz; S. Price; M. Bruno	Marco Polo	4:20
12.	"Everyday Shit"	K. Blake; D. Yates Jr.; J. Bush; E. Matlock; J. Hood	Coptic; Soul G	3:36
13.	"Words from Tek"	T. Williams; M. Richardson	Moods And Vibrations Productions	1:22
14.	"Yesterday"	K. Blake; D. Yates Jr.; T. Williams; J. Steinbacher	Dub Dot Z	3:31
Total length:				45:29

== Personnel ==
Boot Camp Clik

- Kenyatta "Buckshot" Blake – vocals (tracks: 2–12, 14), executive producer
- Darrell "Steele" Yates Jr. – vocals (tracks: 2–8, 10–12, 14)
- Tekomin "Tek" Williams – vocals (tracks: 2–6, 8–10, 13, 14)
- Jahmal "Rock" Bush – vocals (tracks: 3, 5, 8, 11, 12)
- Sean "Ruck" Price – vocals (tracks: 3, 4, 7, 11)
- Dashawn "Top Dog" Yates – vocals (tracks: 3, 11)
- Jack "Starang Wondah" McNair – vocals (track 4)

Guest musicians

- N. "G-Tang" Friedman – vocals (track 1)
- Victor "Ruste Juxx" Evans – vocals (tracks: 5, 10)
- Kasim "5ft" Reid – vocals (track 5)
- Demetrio "Supreme of the Representativz" Muniz – vocals (tracks: 7, 11)
- A. "Blue Flame" Green – vocals (track 9)

Technical

- Dan Humiston – producer (tracks: 1, 4, 5), mixing
- Eric "Coptic" Matlock – producer (tracks: 2, 9, 12)
- Gerald "Soul G" Stevens – producer (tracks: 2, 9, 12)
- Dominick "Nottz" Lamb – producer (track 3)
- Fred Levy – producer (track 4)
- Chris Brown – producer (track 5)
- Marco Bruno – producer (tracks: 6, 11)
- Patrick "9th Wonder" Douthit – producer (track 7)
- Jaywan Zeglis – producer (track 8)
- B. "Marvel" Stefanic – producer (track 10)
- Miguel Richardson – producer (track 13)
- Jeff Steinbacher – producer (track 14)
- Drew "Dru-Ha" Friedman – executive producer
- Rob "Giambi" Garcia – engineering
- C/4 – engineering
- M Nasty – engineering
- Michael Sarsfield – mastering
- Skrilla Design – art direction, design
- Todd Cameron Westphal – photography
