= Collect Dis Edition =

Compilation album by Various artists
- Released: February 11, 2003
- Genre: Hip Hop
- Label: Duck Down Records
- Producer: Da Beatminerz; DJ The Boy; Ayatollah; Black Milk; M-Boogie; Bucktown USA; Agallah; Black Market; Knobody; Masta Ace; Coptic

Collect Dis Edition is a 2003 compilation album released on Duck Down Records. The compilation features a number of singles recorded by Boot Camp Clik members and affiliates between 2000 and 2002, as well as past collaborations.

== Track listing ==
1. "Rush" by Black Moon (Produced by Da Beatminerz)
  - Originally released on Black Moon's Rush single (2003, Duck Down Records)
2. "What's Poppin'" by Boot Camp Clik (Produced by DJ THE Boy)
  - Originally released on Black Moon's Rush single (2003, Duck Down Records)
3. "Smile In Heaven" by Boot Camp Clik & Twanie Ranks (Produced by Da Beatminerz)
  - Originally released on Black Moon's Rush single (2003, Duck Down Records)
4. "All Massive" by Tek (Produced by Ayatollah)
  - Originally released on Tek's All Massive single (2001, Windmill Records)
5. "Don't Say Shit To Ruck" by Sean Price (Produced by Agallah)
  - Originally released on Sean Price's Don't Say Shit to Ruck single (2002, Duck Down Records)
6. "That's What's Up" by Starang Wondah (Produced by Black Milk)
  - Originally released on Starang Wondah's That's What's Up single (2002, Duck Down Records)
7. "Fire Burn" by Boot Camp Clik (Produced by Da Beatminerz)
8. "The Real" by Buckshot (Produced by M-Boogie)
  - Originally released on M-Boogie's The Real single (2001, Ill Boogie Records)
9. "Mastered The Style" by Ruste Juxx (Produced by Bucktown USA)
  - Originally released on Rustee Juxx's Mastered the Style single (2002, Duck Down Records)
10. "Tel E Mundo" by Sean Price (Produced by Agallah)
  - Originally released on Sean Price's Tel E Mundo single (2002, Duck Down Records)
11. "You Could Get Shot" by Buckshot (Produced by Bucktown USA)
  - Originally released on Buckshot's You Could Get Shot single (2001, Duck Down Records)
12. "The Game" by Starang Wondah (Produced by Black Market)
  - Originally released on Starang Wondah's That's What's Up single (2002, Duck Down Records)
13. "D&D Soundclash" by Afu-Ra, Cocoa Brovaz & Jahdan (Produced by Da Beatminerz)
  - Originally released on Afu-Ra's Body of the Life Force album (2000, Koch Records)
14. "Luv Em Or Leave Em Alone" by Boot Camp Clik (Produced by Knobody)
15. "Last Bref" by Masta Ace (Produced by Masta Ace
  - Originally released on Masta Ace's Brooklyn Blocks single (2000, Duck Down Records)
16. "No Justice, No Peace" by Cocoa Brovaz (Produced by Bucktown USA)
17. "I Realize" by Boot Camp Clik (Produced by Coptic)
  - Originally released on Black Moon's Rush single (2003, Duck Down Records)

== Singles chart positions ==
Year	Song	Hot Rap Singles
2001	"All Massive"	20
