= The Fab 5 =

American hip hop group

- Origin: Brooklyn, New York
- Genre: Hip Hop
- Years active: 1995 – 1999
- Label: Duck Down Records
- Past members: O.G.C. (Louieville Sluggah, Starang Wondah and Top Dog); Rock; Sean Price (deceased)

The Fab 5 was a Hip Hop group that consisted of Heltah Skeltah (Rock and Ruck) and O.G.C. (Starang Wondah, Louieville Sluggah and Top Dog). The group joined the Boot Camp Clik and signed a record deal with Duck Down Records in 1995. They released their debut single "Blah" b/w "Leflaur Leflah Eshkoshka" later that year, with the B-Side "Leflah" becoming a surprise Billboard Hot 100 hit in 1995. The two groups split up to release separate debut albums in 1996, with Heltah Skeltah dropping Nocturnal in June (including "Leflah"), and O.G.C. dropping Da Storm in October. Da Storm did not feature a Fab 5 track, and neither did Heltah Skeltah's 1998 second album Magnum Force. The next "Fab 5" track came on O.G.C.'s 1999 second effort The M-Pire Shrikez Back, on the song "Dirtiest Players in the Game", which was supposed to serve as a prelude to a full-length Fab 5 album. Multiple Duck Down Records releases noted plans for a Fab 5 album in the liner notes, with the album being named either Simply Fabulous or Without the Freddy. The album was never released, due to Rock leaving Duck Down Records in 1999 in pursuit of a solo career. All five took part in the latest Boot Camp Clik album The Last Stand, released July 18, 2006. On August 8, 2015, group member Sean Price died in his sleep in his apartment in Brooklyn at the age of 43.

== Discography ==
- Nocturnal Heltah Skeltah (1996)
- Da Storm O.G.C. (1996)
- Magnum Force Heltah Skeltah (1998)
- The M-Pire Shrikez Back O.G.C. (1999)
- D.I.R.T. (Da Incredible Rap Team) Heltah Skeltah (2008)
