= I Ain't Havin' That =

1998 single by Heltah Skeltah, Starang Wundah & Doc Holiday

"I Ain't Havin That"

Single by Heltah Skeltah featuring Starang Wondah and Doc Holiday

from the album Magnum Force
- B-side: "Worldwide"
- Released: August 3, 1998
- Studio: D&D Studios (New York, NY)
- Genre: East Coast hip hop; hardcore hip hop
- Label: Duck Down; Priority
- Songwriters: Jahmal Bush; Sean Price; Jack McNair; Ronnie Duren
- Producers: Cuzin Bawb; Starang Wondah

Heltah Skeltah singles chronology
"Therapy" (1996)	"I Ain't Havin That" (1998)	"The Crab Inn / Caca Gosa Vixen" (2000)

Music video
- "I Ain't Havin' That" on YouTube

Professional ratings
Review scores
Source	Rating
AllMusic	3/5 stars

"I Ain't Havin' That" is a song written and performed by American hip hop duo Heltah Skeltah featuring fellow rappers Starang Wondah and Doc Holiday. It was released on August 3, 1998, via Duck Down/Priority Records as the lead single from the duo's second studio album Magnum Force. Recording sessions took place at D&D Studios in New York City. Production was handled by Cuzin Bawb and Starang Wondah. The song sampled A Tribe Called Quest's "Hot Sex" and Redman's "Pick It Up".

The single peaked at number 80 on the US Billboard Hot 100 and at number 58 on the Hot R&B/Hip-Hop Songs chart.

== Track listing ==
CD maxi single
No.	Title	Writer(s)	Producer(s)	Length
1.	"I Ain't Havin' That (Explicit)" (featuring Starang Wondah and Doc Holiday)	Jahmal Bush; Sean Price; Jack McNair; Ronnie Duren; Jonathan Davis; Ali Shaheed Muhammad; Malik Taylor; Erick Sermon; Reggie Noble	Cuzin Bawb; Starang Wondah
2.	"I Ain't Havin' That (Instrumental)"	Bush; Price; McNair; Davis; Muhammad; Taylor; Sermon; Noble	Cuzin Bawb; Starang Wondah
3.	"I Ain't Havin' That (Clean)" (featuring Starang Wondah and Doc Holiday)	Bush; Price; McNair; Duren; Davis; Muhammad; Taylor; Sermon; Noble	Cuzin Bawb; Starang Wondah
4.	"Worldwide (Explicit)"	Bush; Price; Edward Hinson	Self
5.	"Worldwide (Instrumental)"	Bush; Price; Hinson	Self
6.	"Worldwide (Clean)"	Bush; Price; Hinson	Self

== Personnel ==
"I Ain't Havin' That"

- Jahmal Bush – main artist, vocals
- Sean Price – main artist, vocals
- Jack McNair – featured artist, vocals, producer
- Ronnie Duren – featured artist, vocals
- Ed Miller – engineering

"Worldwide"

- Jahmal Bush – main artist, vocals
- Sean Price – main artist, vocals
- Edward Hinson – producer
- Ed Miller – engineering

== Charts ==
Chart (1998)	Peak position
US Billboard Hot 100	80
US Hot R&B/Hip-Hop Songs (Billboard)	58
