= 1998 in hip-hop =

This article summarizes the events, album releases, and album release dates in hip hop music for the year 1998.

== Released albums ==
Release Date	Artist	Album
January 13	The Lox	Money, Power & Respect
January 13	Funkdoobiest	The Troubleshooters
January 20	Saafir	Trigonometry
January 20	Young Bleed	My Balls and My Word
January 27	GP Wu	Don't Go Against the Grain
January 27	Various Artists	Ride (soundtrack)
February 3	Myzery	Para la Isla
February 10	Wataz	Natural High
February 17	Silkk the Shocker	Charge It 2 da Game
February 24	Above the Law	Legends
February 24	C-Bo	Til My Casket Drops
February 24	E.S.G.	Return of the Living Dead
February 24	Various Artists	Caught Up (soundtrack)
February 24	Prophet Posse	Body Parts
March 3	Scarface	My Homies
March 10	Killah Priest	Heavy Mental
March 17	Fat Pat	Ghetto Dreams
March 17	Various Artists	The Players Club (soundtrack)
March 24	Cappadonna	The Pillage
March 24	C-Murder	Life or Death
March 24	Das EFX	Generation EFX
March 24	Hieroglyphics	3rd Eye Vision
March 24	Lil' Keke	Commission
March 24	People Under the Stairs	The Next Step
March 24	Sylk-E. Fyne	Raw Sylk
March 24	Various Artists	Ruthless Records Tenth Anniversary: Decade of Game
March 31	Daz Dillinger	Retaliation, Revenge and Get Back
March 31	Gang Starr	Moment of Truth
March 31	Hussein Fatal	In the Line of Fire
March 31	Smif-n-Wessun	The Rude Awakening
March 31	Various Artists	Butter (soundtrack)
April 7	AZ	Pieces of a Man
April 7	Do or Die	Headz or Tailz
April 7	Fat Pat	Throwed in da Game
April 7	Goodie Mob	Still Standing
April 7	Various Artists	I Got the Hook Up (soundtrack)
April 13	Mark B	Hitmen for Hire
April 14	Aceyalone	A Book of Human Language
April 20	Massive Attack	Mezzanine
April 20	Souls of Mischief	Focus
April 21	Allfrumtha I	Allfrumtha I
April 21	Marvaless	Fearless
April 21	Various Artists	Bulworth (soundtrack)
April 28	Big Daddy Kane	Veteranz Day
April 28	Big Pun	Capital Punishment
April 28	Mac Dre	Stupid Doo Doo Dumb
April 28	Public Enemy	He Got Game (soundtrack)
April 28	WC	The Shadiest One
May 1	Shades of Culture	Mindstate
May 5	Various Artists	Woo (soundtrack)
May 5	Fiend	There's One in Every Family
May 5	Rawkus Records	Lyricist Lounge, Volume One
May 12	Various Artists	Streets Is Watching (soundtrack)
May 19	DJ Jazzy Jeff & The Fresh Prince	Greatest Hits
May 19	DMX	It's Dark and Hell Is Hot
May 19	Snoop Dogg	Smokefest Underground
May 19	Soulja Slim	Give It 2 'Em Raw
May 19	Too Short	Nationwide: Independence Day
May 19	Eightball	Lost
May 24	Show and A.G.	Full Scale (EP)
May 26	Mo Thugs	Chapter II: Family Reunion
June 1	Jurassic 5	Jurassic 5
June 1	All Natural	No Additives, No Preservatives
June 2	Lord Tariq & Peter Gunz	Make It Reign
June 2	Master P	MP Da Last Don
June 2	Onyx	Shut 'Em Down
June 9	Various Artists	Hav Plenty (soundtrack)
June 15	Lewis Parker	Masquerades & Silhouettes
June 16	Devin the Dude	The Dude
June 16	Queen Latifah	Order in the Court
June 16	Various Artists	Dr. Dolittle (soundtrack)
June 16	Z-Ro	Look What You Did to Me
June 23	Andre Nickatina	Raven in My Eyes
June 23	John Forte	Poly Sci
June 23	Ka'Nut	Look At 'Em Now
June 23	Lil' Troy	Sittin' Fat Down South
June 30	Black Eyed Peas	Behind the Front
June 30	Def Squad	El Niño
June 30	Ganksta N-I-P	Interview with a Killa
June 30	MC Ren	Ruthless for Life
July 7	Kane & Abel	Am I My Brother's Keeper
July 7	Noreaga	N.O.R.E.
July 14	Beastie Boys	Hello Nasty
July 14	Celly Cel	The G Filez
July 21	69 Boyz	The Wait Is Over
July 21	Cam'ron	Confessions of Fire
July 21	Nate Dogg	G-Funk Classics, Vol. 1 & 2
July 21	Jermaine Dupri	Life in 1472
July 21	Mac	Shell Shocked
July 21	Mix Master Mike	Anti-Theft Device
July 21	Rasco	Time Waits for No Man
July 21	Sunz of Man	The Last Shall Be First
July 21	Wu-Tang Killa Beez	The Swarm
July 28	Delinquent Habits	Here Come the Horns
August 4	Snoop Dogg	Da Game Is to Be Sold, Not to Be Told
August 4	Twiztid	Mostasteless
August 11	Crime Boss	Still at Large
August 11	E-40	The Element of Surprise
August 11	Funkmaster Flex	The Mix Tape, Vol. III
August 11	Killarmy	Dirty Weaponry
August 11	M.O.P.	First Family 4 Life
August 15	Aesop Rock	Music for Earthworms
August 18	Kid Rock	Devil Without a Cause
August 18	MC Lyte	Seven & Seven
August 18	Styles of Beyond	2000 Fold
August 25	A.D.O.R.	Shock Frequency
August 25	Various Artists	Blade (soundtrack)
August 25	Biz Markie	On the Turntable
August 25	Lauryn Hill	The Miseducation of Lauryn Hill
August 25	Xzibit	40 Dayz & 40 Nightz
September 1	Big Ed the Assassin	The Assassin
September 1	Bizarre	Attack of the Weirdos
September 1	Fat Joe	Don Cartagena
September 1	Flipmode Squad	The Imperial
September 1	Herschelwood Hardheadz	A Million Dollar$ Later
September 8	Canibus	Can-I-Bus
September 8	Digital Underground	Who Got the Gravy?
September 8	Skull Duggery	These Wicked Streets
September 15	Various Artists	Why Do Fools Fall in Love (soundtrack)
September 15	Magic	Sky's the Limit
September 15	The Kaze	Kamakazie Timez Up
September 15	Various Artists	Rush Hour (soundtrack)
September 22	Big Tymers	How You Luv That Vol. 2
September 22	Ghetto Twiinz	No Pain No Gain
September 22	Ras Kass	Rasassination
September 22	Trick Daddy	www.thug.com
September 29	Bad Azz	Word on tha Streets
September 29	Black Star	Mos Def & Talib Kweli are Black Star
September 29	Brand Nubian	Foundation
September 29	Gangsta Boo	Enquiring Minds
September 29	Jay-Z	Vol. 2... Hard Knock Life
September 29	No Limit Records	Mean Green
September 29	OutKast	Aquemini
September 29	A Tribe Called Quest	The Love Movement
October 6	Bizzy Bone	Heaven'z Movie
October 6	Cypress Hill	Cypress Hill IV
October 6	Kurupt	Kuruption!
October 6	Mack 10	The Recipe
October 6	P.M. Dawn	Dearest Christian, I'm So Very Sorry for Bringing You Here. Love, Dad
October 6	Prime Suspects	Guilty 'til Proven Innocent
October 6	Tela	Now or Never
October 6	Twista & the Speedknot Mobstaz	Mobstability
October 6	Various Artists	So So Def Bass All-Stars Vol. III
October 13	Heltah Skeltah	Magnum Force
October 13	Various Artists	Slam: The Soundtrack
October 13	The Dynospectrum	The Dynospectrum
October 17	Beat Junkies	World Famous Beat Junkies Vol. 2
October 19	Ex-Prez	1019
October 20	Deadly Venoms	The Antidote
October 20	Ghetto Mafia	On da Grind
October 20	Vanilla Ice	Hard to Swallow
October 20	Gambino Family	Ghetto Organized
October 20	Kool G Rap	Roots of Evil
October 27	Bushwick Bill	No Surrender No Retreat
October 27	Mia X	Mama Drama
October 27	M-Doc	Young, Black, Rich and Famous
October 27	Pras	Ghetto Supastar
November 3	Various Artists	Belly (soundtrack)
November 3	Crucial Conflict	Good Side, Bad Side
November 3	Juvenile	400 Degreez
November 3	All City	Metropolis Gold
November 3	GRITS	Factors of the Seven
November 3	Kid Capri	Soundtrack to the Streets
November 3	Various Artists	Straight Outta Compton: N.W.A 10th Anniversary Tribute
November 3	Yukmouth	Thugged Out: The Albulation
November 10	The Coup	Steal This Album
November 10	Ghetto Commission	Wise Guys
November 10	Pete Rock	Soul Survivor
November 10	Spice 1	Hits
November 10	Various Artists	The Source Presents: Hip Hop Hits, Vol. 2
November 17	Geto Boys	Da Good da Bad & da Ugly
November 17	Ice Cube	War & Peace Vol. 1 (The War Disc)
November 17	Method Man	Tical 2000: Judgement Day
November 17	LA the Darkman	Heist of the Century
November 17	Various Artists	Fakin' da Funk (soundtrack)
November 24	Bone Thugs-N-Harmony	The Collection, Vol. 1
November 24	DJ Quik	Rhythm-al-ism
November 24	RZA	Bobby Digital in Stereo
November 24	Steady Mobb'n	Black Mafia
November 24	2Pac	Greatest Hits
November 24	Timbaland	Tim's Bio: Life From Da Bassment
November 30	Trinity Garden Cartel	I'd Rather Be Judged by 12 Than Carried by 6
December 1	Full Blooded	Memorial Day
December 8	No Limit Records	We Can't Be Stopped
December 8	Redman	Doc's da Name 2000
December 15	Busta Rhymes	E.L.E. (Extinction Level Event): The Final World Front
December 15	Mystikal	Ghetto Fabulous
December 15	DJ Clue	The Professional
December 22	DMX	Flesh of My Flesh, Blood of My Blood
December 22	Southside Playaz	You Got Us Fuxxed Up

== Highest-charting singles ==
Hip hop singles from any year which charted in the 1998 Top 40 of the Billboard Hot 100
Song	Artist	Project	Peak position
"Doo Wop (That Thing)"	Lauryn Hill	The Miseducation of Lauryn Hill	1
"Been Around the World"	Puff Daddy featuring The Notorious B.I.G. & Mase	No Way Out	2
"What You Want"	Mase featuring Total	Harlem World	6
"Lookin' at Me"	Mase featuring Puff Daddy	Harlem World	8
"Dangerous"	Busta Rhymes	When Disaster Strikes	9
"Turn It Up (Remix)/Fire It Up"	Busta Rhymes	When Disaster Strikes	10
"Ghetto Supastar (That Is What You Are)"	Pras featuring Ol' Dirty Bastard & Mýa	Ghetto Supastar	15
"Hard Knock Life (Ghetto Anthem)"	Jay-Z	Vol. 2... Hard Knock Life	15
"Money, Power & Respect"	The LOX featuring DMX & Lil Kim	Money, Power & Respect	17
"Father"	LL Cool J	Phenomenon	18
"Still a G Thang"	Snoop Dogg	Da Game Is to Be Sold, Not to Be Told	19
"Victory"	Puff Daddy featuring The Notorious B.I.G. & Busta Rhymes	No Way Out	19
"Do For Love"	2Pac featuring Eric Williams	R U Still Down?	21
"Still Not a Player"	Big Pun	Capital Punishment	24
"Going Back to Cali"	The Notorious B.I.G	Life After Death	26
"Intergalactic"	Beastie Boys	Hello Nasty	28
"The Party Continues"	Jermaine Dupri featuring Da Brat & Usher	Life in 1472	29
"If You Think I'm Jiggy"	The LOX	Money, Power & Respect	30
"Get At Me Dog"	DMX featuring Sheek Louch	It's Dark and Hell is Hot	36
"Superthug"	Noreaga	N.O.R.E.	36
"Clock Strikes"	Timbaland & Magoo	Welcome to Our World	37

== Highest first-week album sales ==
List of top ten albums with the highest first-week home market sales
Number	Album	Artist	1st-week sales	1st-week position	Refs
1	Hello Nasty	Beastie Boys	681,000	1	
2	Flesh of My Flesh, Blood of My Blood	DMX	670,000	1	
3	Da Game Is to Be Sold, Not to Be Told	Snoop Dogg	520,000	1	
4	MP Da Last Don	Master P	495,000	1	
5	The Miseducation of Lauryn Hill	Lauryn Hill	422,624	1	
6	Tical 2000: Judgement Day	Method Man	411,000	2	
7	Ghetto Fabulous	Mystikal	386,000	5	
8	Vol. 2... Hard Knock Life	Jay-Z	350,000	1	
9	Charge It 2 Da Game	Silkk The Shocker	288,000	3	
10	Greatest Hits	2Pac	268,000	5	

== See also ==
- Last article: 1997 in hip hop music
- Next article: 1999 in hip hop music
