= For the People (Boot Camp Clik album) =

1997 studio album by Boot Camp Clik

Studio album by Boot Camp Clik
- Released: May 20, 1997
- Recorded: September 1996 – March 1997
- Studio: D&D; Chung King
- Genre: East Coast hip-hop; underground hip-hop
- Length: 1:06:32
- Label: Priority
- Producer: Drew "Dru-Ha" Friedman (exec.); Steele (exec.); Buckshot (exec.); BJ Swan; Boogie Brown; EZ Elpee; Louieville Sluggah; Shaleek; Shawn J Period; Squia; Tony Touch

Boot Camp Clik chronology
For the People (1997)	Basic Training (2000)

Professional ratings
Review scores
Source	Rating
AllMusic	3/5 stars
RapReviews	6/10
The Source	3.5/5 stars

For the People is the debut album by American hip-hop supergroup Boot Camp Clik. It was released on May 20, 1997, via Priority Records and re-released as Still For the People on April 24, 2007, via Duck Down Music. The recording sessions took place from September 1996 to March 1997 at D&D Studios and at Chung King Studios in New York. The production was handled by Mark "Boogie" Brown, Buckshot, Shawn J Period, Tony Touch, BJ Swan, Shaleek, EZ Elpee, Squia and Louieville Sluggah. The album peaked at number 15 on the Billboard 200 and number 4 on the Top R&B/Hip-Hop Albums chart.

== Track listing ==
No.	Title	Writer(s)	Producer(s)	Length
1.	"1-900 Get Da Boot" (featuring the Original K.I.M.)		"The people"	1:21
2.	"Down by Law"		Tony Touch	3:01
3.	"Night Riders" (featuring LaVoice)	Darrel Yates Jr.; Tekomin Williams; Kenyatta Blake; L. McGee	Buckshot; Mark "Boogie" Brown	5:14
4.	"Headz Are Reddee, Pt. 2"	Barret Powell; Williams; Yates Jr.; Jahmal Bush; Jack McNair; Dashawn Yates; Sean Price; Blake; Derwin Benoit	BJ Swan; Mark "Boogie" Brown	5:08
5.	"Watch Your Step" (featuring the Representativz)	Demetrio Muniz; Louis Johnson; Darryl Pearson	Shaleek	4:56
6.	"Illa Noyz" (featuring Illa Noyz)	Shawn M. Jones; Wayne Evans; Price; Bush	Shawn J. Period	4:10
7.	"Rag Time" (featuring Mada Rocka and LS)	Yates Jr.; Blake; Jacob Clarke	Mark "Boogie" Brown	5:19
8.	"Blackout" (featuring BJ Swan, Supreme and Illa Noyz)	Bennoit; Bush; McNair; Powell; Muniz; Yates Jr.; Evans	Buckshot; Mark "Boogie" Brown	5:15
9.	"Ohkeedoke" (featuring MS)	Williams; McNair; M.S.	EZ Elpee	5:16
10.	"Rugged Terrain" (featuring Twanie Ranks)	Yates; Antoine Cassidy	Squia	3:47
11.	"The Dugout"	Mark Brown; Powell	Louieville Sluggah; Mark "Boogie" Brown	5:10
12.	"Go for Yours" (featuring The B.T.J.'s)	Daniel Brown; J. Smith; A. Nash; Jones	Shawn J. Period	5:43
13.	"Likkle Youth Man Dem"	Williams; Yates Jr.; Yates; Powell; McNair	Buckshot; Mark "Boogie" Brown	5:42
14.	"Last Time" (featuring BJ Swan and FLOW)	Blake; Bennoit; Yates Jr.; F. Goldsberry; D. Ellis	Buckshot; Mark "Boogie" Brown	6:30
Total length:				1:06:32

Notes

- On the track 2 the Boot Camp Clik is credited as 'everyone & their mother'
- Track 13 is listed as bonus track and performed by The Fab 5

Sample credits

- Track 2 contains a sample from "Mt. Airy Groove" written by Curtis Harmon, James Keith Lloyd and Cedric A. Napoleon as recorded by Pieces Of A Dream
- Track 11 contains an interpolation of "Louie Louie" written by Richard Berry

== Personnel ==
Boot Camp Clik (The Great 8)

- Kenyatta "Buckshot" Blake – vocals (tracks: 2–4, 7, 14), additional vocals (track 11), producer (tracks: 3, 8, 13, 14), executive producer
- Darrell "Steele" Yates, Jr. – vocals (tracks: 2–4, 7, 8, 13, 14), additional vocals (track 10), executive producer
- Tekomin "Tek" Williams – vocals (tracks: 2–4, 9, 13), additional vocals (track 10)
- Barret "Louieville Sluggah" Powell – vocals (tracks: 2, 4, 8, 11, 13), additional vocals (track 5), producer (track 11)
- Jack "Starang Wondah" McNair – vocals (tracks: 2, 4, 8, 9, 13)
- Dashawn "Top Dog" Yates – vocals (tracks: 2, 4, 10, 13)
- Jahmal "Rock" Bush – vocals (tracks: 2, 4, 6, 8, 13), additional vocals (track 5)
- Sean "Ruck" Price – vocals (tracks: 2, 4, 6, 13)

Guest performers

- The Original K.I.M. – vocals (track 1)
- LaVoice McGee – additional vocals (track 3)
- Demetrio "Supreme" Muniz – vocals (tracks: 5, 8)
- Louis "Lidu Rock" Johnson – vocals (track 5)
- Wayne "Illa Noyz" Evans – vocals (tracks: 6, 8)
- Mada Rocka – vocals (track 7)
- Jacob "LS" Clarke – vocals (track 7)
- Derwin "BJ Swan" Benoit – vocals (tracks: 8, 14), producer (track 4)
- M.S. – vocals (track 9)
- Antoine "Twanie Ranks" Cassidy – vocals (track 10)
- Daniel "D. Real" Brown – vocals (track 12)
- J. "El Sha" J. Smith – vocals (track 12)
- A. "Lil' Knock" Nash – vocals (track 12)
- F.L.O.W. – vocals (track 14)

Technical

- Joseph "Tony Touch" Hernandez – producer (track 2)
- Mark "Boogie" Brown – producer (tracks: 3, 4, 7, 8, 11, 13, 14)
- Darryl "Shaleek" Pearson – producer (track 5)
- Shawn M. Jones – producer (tracks: 6, 12)
- Lamont "EZ Elpee" Porter – producer (track 9)
- Squia – producer (track 10)
- Drew "Dru-Ha" Friedman – executive producer
- Leo "Swift" Morris – engineering (tracks: 2–5, 8, 11)
- Kieran Walsh – engineering (tracks: 5–7, 9, 10, 12)
- Joe Quinde – engineering (track 8)
- Joseph M. Palmaccio – mastering

== Charts ==
=== Weekly charts ===
Chart (1997)	Peak position
US Billboard 200	15
US Top R&B/Hip-Hop Albums (Billboard)	4

=== Year-end charts ===
Chart (1997)	Position
US Top R&B/Hip-Hop Albums (Billboard)	99
