= Da Storm =

Studio album by Originoo Gunn Clappaz
- Released: October 29, 1996
- Recorded: 1995–1996
- Studio: Chung King (New York City); D&D (New York City); WPGC-FM (Washington, D.C.); Platinum Island (New York City); Unique Studios (New York City)
- Genre: Hip-hop
- Length: 50:37
- Label: Duck Down; Priority
- Producer: Da Beatminerz; DJ Ogee; E-Swift; Shaleek; Steele; Big Tigger; Buckshot (co.); Lord Jamar (co.); Madlib (co.); Starang Wondah (co.); Supreme (co.); Yuwee The Ambasitor (co.)

Originoo Gunn Clappaz chronology
Da Storm (1996)	The M-Pire Shrikez Back (1999)

Singles from Da Storm
- 1. "No Fear" Released: September 10, 1996; 2. "Hurricane Starang" / "Danjer" Released: February 1997

Professional ratings
Review scores
Source	Rating
AllMusic	3/5 stars
Muzik	3.5/5 stars
RapReviews	10/10
The Source	3.5/5 stars

Da Storm is the first studio album by American hip-hop trio Originoo Gunn Clappaz. It was released on October 29, 1996, through Duck Down/Priority Records. Recording sessions took place at Chung King Studios, at D&D Studios, at Platinum Island Studios and at Unique Studios in New York, and at WPGC FM in Washington. Production was handled by Da Beatminerz, DJ Ogee, E-Swift, Shaleek and Steele. It features guest appearances from Bad Vybes, M.S., Sadat X, Sean Black and the Representativz. The album peaked at number 47 on the Billboard 200 and number 10 on the Top R&B/Hip-Hop Albums. Two singles were released from the album: "No Fear" and "Hurricane Starang".

O.G.C. members Starang Wondah, Top Dog and Louieville Sluggah gained fame as members of the hip-hop collective Boot Camp Clik, first appearing with Heltah Skeltah as 'The Fab 5' in 1995. The two groups split up to release separate albums in 1996, with Da Storm being the last Boot Camp Clik release after Black Moon's Enta da Stage, Smif-N-Wessun's Dah Shinin' and Heltah Skeltah's Nocturnal. Of these four Boot Camp albums, Da Storm sold the least, reaching just over 200,000 copies in the United States.

== Singles ==
"No Fear" b/w "Da Storm" was released as the lead single from the album. It peaked at number 15 on the Billboard Bubbling Under Hot 100, number 63 on the Hot R&B/Hip-Hop Songs and number 13 on the Hot Rap Songs. The music video for "No Fear" caused a small dispute between Starang Wondah and The Notorious B.I.G. as it contained a Biggie look-alike when Starang said the lines, "I scare, petty MCs who claim they got gats/frontin wit hoes in videos with pimp hats/but the fact, still remains/that you're just a stain on the bottom of my boots while I'm still Starang". Starang was attacked by Biggie's henchmen at D&D Studios, and later mentions the attack on Heltah Skeltah's 1998 track "I Ain't Havin' That". "No Fear" was also used by Beyoncé Knowles on her 2003 hit "Baby Boy".

"Hurricane Starang" b/w "Gunn Clapp" and "Danjer", released as the album's second single, has a split video made up for "Hurricane Starang" and "Danjer", titled "Hurricane Danjer".

== Track listing ==
No.	Title	Writer(s)	Producer(s)	Length
1.	"Intro"		Baby Paul; Starang Wondah^{[a]}	0:20
2.	"Calm Before da Storm"	Dashawn Yates; Barret Powell; Jack K. McNair; Darryl Pearson	Shaleek	3:26
3.	"No Fear"	McNair; Powell; Yates; Walter V. Dewgarde	Mr. Walt	4:08
4.	"Boom...Boom... Fucking Prick"			0:27
5.	"Gunn Clapp"	Yates; Powell; McNair; W. Dewgarde	Mr. Walt	4:50
6.	"Emergency Broadcast System"		Big Tigger and his hip hop critics	0:27
7.	"Hurricane Starang"	McNair; W. Dewgarde	Mr. Walt	4:04
8.	"Danjer"	Powell; Yates; McNair; Paul Anthony Hendricks	Baby Paul	3:17
9.	"Elements of da Storm"	Yates; Darrell A. Yates Jr.; Y. Barsi	Steele; Supreme^{[a]}; Yuwee The Ambasitor^{[a]}	2:06
10.	"Da Storm"	Yates; Powell; McNair; Ewart C. Dewgarde	DJ Evil Dee	4:09
11.	"Wild Cowboys in Bucktown" (featuring Sadat X and Sean Black)	McNair; Yates; Derek Murphy; Powell; Sean Black; Gary Scott	DJ Ogee	4:35
12.	"God Don't Like Ugly"	McNair; Powell; Yates; Kenyatta Blake	Buckshot^{[a]}; Lord Jamar^{[a]}	4:46
13.	"X-Unknown"	Powell; Yates; McNair; E. Dewgarde	DJ Evil Dee	4:35
14.	"Elite Fleet" (featuring MS, the Representativz and Bad Vybes)	Yates; Powell; McNair; Louis Johnson; Demetrio Muniz; Bad Vybes; M.S.; Hendricks	Baby Paul	5:23
15.	"Flappin'"	Yates; McNair; Powell; Eric Brooks	E-Swift; Madlib^{[a]}	4:04
Total length:				50:37

Notes

- ^{^[a]} signifies a co-producer
- Track 7 features additional rap vocals by Da Rockness Monstas

Sample credits

- Track 7 contains a sample from "Country Roads" as recorded by the Gary Burton Quartet
- Track 8 contains a sample from "New Spaces" as recorded by the John Payne Band
- Track 14 contains a sample from "Past Days" as recorded by the John Payne Band and "Flava in Ya Ear" as recorded by Craig Mack
- Track 15 contains a sample from "All I Have to do is Dream" by The Everly Brothers and "Past Days" as recorded by the John Payne Band

== Personnel ==
Originoo Gunn Clappaz

- Jack "Starang Wondah" McNair – rap vocals (tracks: 2, 3, 5, 7, 8, 10–15), co-producer (track 1), mixing (tracks: 10, 13)
- Dashawn "Top Dog" Yates – rap vocals (tracks: 2, 3, 5, 8–15), arranging (track 9)
- Barret "Louieville Sluggah" Powell – rap vocals (tracks: 2, 3, 5, 8, 10–15)

Guest musicians

- Derek "Sadat X" Murphy – rap vocals (track 11)
- Sean Black – rap vocals (track 11)
- Demetrio "Supreme" Muniz – rap vocals (track 14), co-producer (track 9)
- Louis "Lidu Rock" Johnson – rap vocals (track 14)
- Bad Vybes – rap vocals (track 14)
- M.S. – rap vocals (track 14)
- Da Rockness Monstas – additional rap vocals (track 7)
- Paul "Baby Paul Hendricks – producer (tracks: 1, 8, 14)
- Darryl "Shaleek" Pearson – producer (track 2)
- Walter "Mr. Walt" Dewgarde – producer (tracks: 3, 4, 7)
- Darian "Big Tigger" Morgan – producer (track 6)
- Darrell "Steele" Yates Jr. – producer (track 9)
- Ewart "DJ Evil Dee" Dewgarde – producer (tracks: 10, 13)
- Eric "E-Swift" Brooks – producer (track 15)
- Yuwee "The Ambasitor" Barsi – co-producer (track 9)
- Kenyatta "Buckshot" Blake – co-producer (track 12), mixing (tracks: 3, 7, 10)
- Lorenzo "Lord Jamar Dechalus – co-producer (track 12)
- Otis "Madlib" Jackson, Jr. – co-producer (track 15)
- Drew "Dru-Ha" Friedman – mixing (tracks: 3, 7, 10, 13)
- Kieran Walsh – engineering (tracks: 2, 3, 5, 7, 8, 10, 11, 13, 14)
- John Wydrycs – engineering (tracks: 7, 8, 12–15)
- Dexter Thibou – assistant engineering (tracks: 2, 3, 5, 7, 8, 10, 11, 13, 14)
- Alex Olsson – assistant engineering (track 7)
- Jay Nicholas – assistant engineering (tracks: 8, 12–15)
- Tramp and Huy – design
- Mo-B – photography

== Charts ==
Chart (1996)	Peak position
US Billboard 200	47
US Top R&B/Hip-Hop Albums (Billboard)	10
