= The Chosen Few (Boot Camp Clik album) =

Studio album by Boot Camp Clik
- Released: October 8, 2002
- Recorded: 2001–02
- Studio: Audiology Recording Studio (New York, NY)
- Genre: Hip-hop
- Length: 1:02:24
- Label: Duck Down
- Producer: Buckshot (exec.); Drew "Dru-Ha" Friedman (also exec.); Alchemist; Bink!; Curt Cazal; Da Beatminerz; Dan the Man; Eric "Coptic" Matlock; Hi-Tek; The Producers Coalition Of America Inc.; TY Deals

Boot Camp Clik chronology
Basic Training (2000)	The Chosen Few (2002)	The Last Stand (2006)

Singles from The Chosen Few
- 1. "And So... / Whoop His Ass" Released: September 10, 2002; 2. "Think Back / That's Tough" Released: November 26, 2002; 3. "Ice Skate" Released: May 6, 2003

Professional ratings
Review scores
Source	Rating
AllMusic	4.5/5 stars
HipHopDX	4/5
RapReviews	8/10
Vibe	4/5

The Chosen Few is the second studio album by American hip-hop collective Boot Camp Clik. It was released on October 8, 2002, through Duck Down Music, making it the first album released from the group or any affiliate since 1999. Production was handled by Da Beatminerz, Eric "Coptic" Matlock, Curt Cazal, Dan the Man, Drew "Dru-Ha" Friedman, Alchemist, Bink!, Hi-Tek, Producers Coalition of America and TY Deals. The album features contributions from seven of the eight original members with Heltah Skeltah's Rock being the only absent member, as well as guest appearances from Jahdan Blakkamoore, Illa Noyz, Rufus Blaq, Scratch and Supreme.

The effort received very strong reviews, and the singles "And So" and "Think Back" received moderate video play. The Chosen Few was the first Boot Camp album released on an independent label, with sales reaching just over 60,000 copies in the United States.

== Track listing ==
No.	Title	Writer(s)	Producer(s)	Length
1.	"Intro: YO Boot Camp!"		Drew "Dru-Ha" Friedman; Dan The Man	1:19
2.	"And So"	Tekomin Williams; Sean Price; Kenyatta Blake; Darrell Yates Jr.; Dashawn Yates; Curtis Small	Curt Cazal	3:49
3.	"Let's Get Down 2 Bizness"	Price; Blake; Jack McNair; Yates Jr.; Yates; Wayne Evans; Alan Maman	The Alchemist	4:20
4.	"Let's Roll"	Barret Powell; Yates; Williams; McNair; Blake; Yates Jr.; Paul Hendricks	Baby Paul	4:51
5.	"Welcome to Bucktown USA" (featuring Supreme and Scratch)	Yates Jr.; Blake; Williams; Demetrio Muniz; Eric Matlock	Coptic	5:25
6.	"That's Tough (Little Bit)"	Blake; Yates Jr.; Williams; Roosevelt Harrell	Bink!	4:42
7.	"Yeah What Eva" (Skit)	Yates Jr.; Price	Drew "Dru-Ha" Friedman; Dan The Man	1:16
8.	"Had It Up 2 Here" (featuring Illa Noyz)	Yates Jr.; Blake; Williams; McNair; Yates; Price; Evans; Walter Dewgarde	Da Beatminerz	4:43
9.	"Whoop His Ass" (featuring Rufus Blaq)	Blake; Williams; Yater Jr.; Rufus Moore; Francis Palacios; Ross Sloane; Darrol Durant; Roger Munroe	The Producers Coalition Of America Inc.	4:05
10.	"Daddy Wanna"	McNair; Price; Blake; Williams; Yates Jr.; Yates; Ewart Dewgarde	Da Beatminerz	5:16
11.	"Ice Skate"	Price; Blake; Yates Jr.; Yates; Tony Cottrell	Hi-Tek	4:41
12.	"Just Us"	Williams; Blake; Powell; Yates Jr.; Yates; T. Walker	TY Deals	5:24
13.	"Think Back" (featuring Jahdan Blakkamoore)	Blake; Yates Jr.; Williams; Price; W. Dewgarde	Da Beatminerz	4:35
14.	"The Chosen Few (Live for This)"	McNair; Powell; Price; Williams; Blake; Yates Jr.; Matlock; Eugene Dixon; Lena Thompson	Coptic	5:09
15.	"Outro: Word's From Tek"	Williams	Coptic	2:49
Total length:				1:02:24

Notes

- Track 10 features additional vocals by Little Cook WTW2 and Queenia
- Track 11 features additional vocals by Danielle Henry

Sample credits

- Track 14 contains elements from "Tomorrow I May Not Feel the Same" written by Eugene Dixon and Lena Thompson and performed by Gene Chandler

== Charts ==
Chart (2002)	Peak position
US Top R&B/Hip-Hop Albums (Billboard)	34
US Independent Albums (Billboard)	17
