= Representativz =

- Origin: Brownsville, Brooklyn, New York City
- Genres: Hip hop
- Years active: 1996–present
- Labels: Warlock Records; Duck Down Music
- Members: Supreme The Eloheem; Lidu Rock

Representativz are an American hip hop duo formed in 1994 by rappers Supreme The Eloheem and Lidu Rock. The group gained fame through their affiliation with the Boot Camp Clik, with Lidu Rock being the little brother of Heltah Skeltah's Rock, while Supreme being the blood cousin of both Smif-N-Wessun's Steele & O.G.C.'s Top Dog.

The group debuted in 1996 on Heltah Skeltah's acclaimed Nocturnal album, on the track "The Square [Triple R]". Later in 1996, they dropped in on O.G.C.'s Da Storm album, appearing on the song "Elite Fleet". They dropped their first group track on Boot Camp Clik's 1997 album For the People, with the song "Watch Your Step". The duo appeared on multiple tracks on Heltah Skeltah's 1998 album Magnum Force, and followed up in 1999 with an appearance on O.G.C.'s The M-Pire Shrikez Back. Later in 1999, they released their debut album Angels of Death on Warlock Records, featuring appearances from multiple Boot Camp Clik members. Supreme has gone on to release 2 solo albums in 2010 It's My Time...The Eloheem Project and in 2015 Odes of a Street Disciple, but the duo has yet to release another album, although remaining on the Duck Down Music roster.

== Discography ==
Studio album

- 1999: Angels of Death

Singles

- 1998: "Wanna Start"
- 1999: "Spaz Out"

Guest appearances

Year	Song	Artist(s)	Album
1996	"The Square (Triple R)"	Heltah Skeltah	Nocturnal
1996	"Elite Fleet"	Originoo Gunn Clappaz, MS, Bad Vybes	Da Storm
1997	"Freestyle"	Boot Camp Clik, Twanie Ranks	The Mix Tape, Volume II: 60 Minutes of Funk
1997	"Watch Your Step"	N/A	For the People
1998	"Call of the Wild"	Heltah Skeltah, Starang Wondah, Hardcore, Doc Holiday	Magnum Force
1998	"Magnum Force"	Heltah Skeltah, Ruste Juxx	Magnum Force
1998	"Gang's All Here"	Boot Camp Clik	Magnum Force
1999	"Boot Camp MFC Eastern Conference"	Boot Camp Clik, Doc Holiday, Smokelite	The M-Pire Shrikez Back
1999	"Meditation"	N/A	Duck Down Presents: The Album
2003	"My Mic Sounds Nice"	Sean Price	Search and Recover Part III
2008	"Ape Food"	Heltah Skeltah	D.I.R.T. (Da Incredible Rap Team)
2009	"No Sleep 'Til Bucktown"	Boot Camp Clik, Ruste Juxx	Welcome to Bucktown
