= The Exxecution =

Studio album by Marco Polo and Ruste Juxx
- Released: March 23, 2010
- Genre: Hip-hop
- Length: 46:31
- Label: Duck Down
- Producer: Marco Polo

Marco Polo chronology
| Double Barrel (2009) | The Exxecution (2010) | The Stupendous Adventures of Marco Polo (2010) |

Ruste Juxx chronology
| Indestrutcible (2008) | The Exxecution (2010) | Adamantine (2010) |

Singles from The Exxecution
- 1. "Nobody" / "Rearview" Released: 2010

The Exxecution (sometimes stylized as The eXXecution) is a collaborative studio album by Canadian hip-hop record producer Marco Polo and American rapper Ruste Juxx. It was released on March 23, 2010 through Duck Down Music. It features guest appearances from DJ Revolution, Black Moon, Freddie Foxxx, Rock and Sean Price. In the United States, the album peaked at number 67 on the Top R&B/Hip-Hop Albums and number 42 on the Heatseekers Albums charts.

== Critical reception ==
Professional ratings
Aggregate scores
| Source | Rating |
|---|---|
| Metacritic | 85/100 |
Review scores
| Source | Rating |
| AllMusic | 3.5/5 stars |
| HipHopDX | 3/5 |
| RapReviews | 8/10 |
| The Boston Phoenix | 4/4 stars |
| XXL | XL (4/5) |

The Exxecution was met with universal acclaim from music critics. At Metacritic, which assigns a normalized rating out of 100 to reviews from mainstream publications, the album received an average score of 85, based on four reviews.

Chris Faraone of The Boston Phoenix praised the album, stating: "from the ironically melodic 'Death Penalty' to the militaristic 'Rearview', this duo have executed one of the greatest roughneck opuses this side of last century. Let's hope it’s not a one-off". Patrick Taylor of RapReviews wrote: "The Exxecution is twelve songs of slamming, grimey, take-no-prisoners NY hip hop. Ruste Juxx and Marco Polo show lames how it's done, and leave a trail of dead in their wake". Chris Yuscavage of XXL stated: "Juxx's spirited effort on the uplifting "You Can't Stop Me" complements Polo's uptempo production perfectly. It's that balance that ultimately helps The eXXecution go off without a hitch". AllMusic's Matt Rinaldi wrote: "Juxx seems to have benefited from Sean Price's mentoring as he works a perfectly cadenced flow and manages to maintain a high energy level throughout the LP. Still, the most exciting moments on The Exxecution come when Juxx's Duck Down elders stop by".

== Track listing ==
| No. | Title | Length |
|---|---|---|
| 1. | "The Exxecution Intro" (featuring DJ Revolution) | 2:40 |
| 2. | "Death Penalty" (featuring DJ Revolution) | 3:40 |
| 3. | "Rearview" | 3:43 |
| 4. | "Take Money" (featuring Rock and Freddie Foxxx) | 3:55 |
| 5. | "I'm on It" | 3:44 |
| 6. | "Let's Take a Sec" (featuring Black Moon) | 4:16 |
| 7. | "Bread on Ya Head" | 3:43 |
| 8. | "Wings on Your Back" | 3:19 |
| 9. | "Nobody" | 4:23 |
| 10. | "Fuckin wit a Gangsta" (featuring Sean Price) | 4:17 |
| 11. | "Watch Yo Step" | 4:45 |
| 12. | "You Can't Stop Me" | 4:06 |
| Total length: | | 46:31 |

== Charts ==
Chart performance for The Exxecution
| Chart (2010) | Peak position |
|---|---|
| US Top R&B/Hip-Hop Albums (Billboard) | 67 |
| US Heatseekers Albums (Billboard) | 42 |
