= Boot Camp Clik =

American hip hop supergroup

- Origin: Brooklyn, New York City, U.S.
- Genres: East Coast hip hop; hardcore hip hop; underground hip hop
- Years active: 1993–present
- Labels: Priority; Duck Down
- Members: Buckshot; O.G.C. (Louieville Sluggah, Starang Wondah and Top Dog); Rockness Monsta; Smif-N-Wessun (Tek and Steele)
- Past members: Sean Price (Deceased)
- Website: http://duckdown.com

Boot Camp Clik is an American hip hop supergroup from Brooklyn, New York City, which is composed of Buckshot (of Black Moon), Smif-N-Wessun (Tek and Steele), Heltah Skeltah (Rockness Monsta and Sean Price) and O.G.C. (Starang Wondah, Top Dog, and Louieville Sluggah). Most of the members are from Brownsville, but Buckshot is from Crown Heights and Tek is from Bedford-Stuyvesant.

== History ==
=== 1992 to 1996 ===
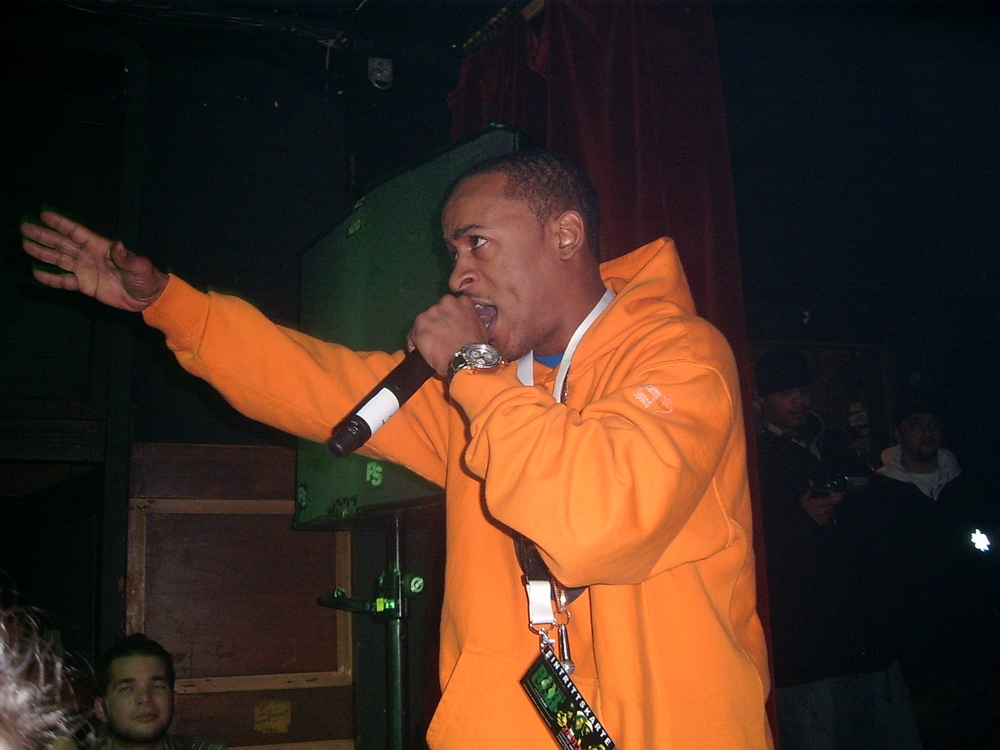
Buckshot

Black Moon debuted in 1992 with the release of the single "Who Got Da Props?". The song became something of an underground phenomenon, and was also able to receive minor crossover success, charting on the Billboard Hot 100 at #86. The popularity of the single lead to a record deal with Nervous Wreck Records, which released the group's debut album Enta Da Stage in late 1993. The album was produced entirely by Evil Dee and Mr. Walt of Da Beatminerz, and featured the debut of Camp members Smif-N-Wessun, as well as an early appearance from Mobb Deep's Havoc. Enta Da Stage was highly acclaimed and influential over the burgeoning hardcore hip hop scene of its time. Preceding later classics like Enter the Wu-Tang (36 Chambers) by Wu-Tang Clan, Illmatic by Nas and Ready to Die by The Notorious B.I.G., Enta Da Stage served as a precursor to the resurgence of the New York City hip hop scene in the mid-90's. Along with "Who Got Da Props?", the album included other classic rap singles "How Many MC's...", "Buck 'Em Down" and "I Got Cha Opin (Remix)", the latter becoming the group's second Hot 100 hit.

Buckshot and Nervous Wreck Records employee Dru Ha were both elemental in getting Smif-N-Wessun signed to the label, and in early 1994, the duo released their debut single, "Bucktown", which, like Black Moon's "Who Got Da Props?", became an underground phenomenon, and also charted on the Billboard Hot 100 chart, peaking at #93. Following the single's release, "Bucktown" became a popular nickname for Brooklyn. "Bucktown" earned Smif-N-Wessun considerable underground hype for their debut album, Dah Shinin', released in early 1995. The album debuted at #5 on the Top R&B/Hip-Hop Albums chart, and, along with "Bucktown", spawned a number of underground hits and music videos, with "Let's Git It On", "Wrekonize", "Sound Bwoy Bureill", "Wontime" and "Stand Strong". Da Beatminerz, which now also included Rich Blak and Baby Paul, produced the entirety of the album. Camp members Heltah Skeltah and O.G.C. made their debuts on the album, appearing on the tracks "Wontime" and "Sound Bwoy Bureill". Dah Shinin also marked the official formation of the Boot Camp Clik, with all eight members appearing on the posse-cut "Cession at da Doghillee".

Heltah Skeltah (Ruck (left) and Rock (center))

Following the release of Dah Shinin, Camp leader Buckshot and business partner Dru Ha founded Duck Down Records after leaving Nervous Records due to unpaid royalties, and signed both Heltah Skeltah and O.G.C. to the label. In mid-1995, the entire Clik (labeled as "Black Moon & Smif-N-Wessun") appeared on the Gold-certified soundtrack to the film New Jersey Drive, with the song "Headz Ain't Redee". In late 1995, Heltah Skeltah and O.G.C. teamed up to form The Fab 5, and released their debut single "Blah" b/w "Leflaur Leflah Eshkoshka". The B-Side, "Leflah", became a surprise hit, peaking at #75 on the Hot 100, making it the most successful single released by any Boot Camp member or affiliate. The two groups split up for separate releases in 1996. Heltah Skeltah was the first to release an album, with Nocturnal dropping in June 1996. This was the first Camp-related album not to be produced entirely by Da Beatminerz. Evil Dee and Mr. Walt produced three tracks, while Beatminer-affiliate Baby Paul produced five tracks. Other producers involved in the project include Lord Jamar (of Brand Nubian), Shaleek, Shawn J. Period, Supreme (of the Representativz), and E-Swift (of Tha Alkaholiks). Like Enta Da Stage and Dah Shinin, Nocturnal was widely acclaimed, and has become a classic of underground hip hop. Along with "Leflah", the album featured a pair of minorly successful singles, the dark, harp-led "Operation Lock Down", and the introspective concept track "Therapy". Nocturnal also featured the debut from Camp affiliates Representativz and Illa Noyz, as well as appearances from O.G.C., Buckshot and Vinia Mojica.

In the summer of 1996, hip hop superstar 2Pac personally invited Buckshot, Dru-Ha, Tek and Steele to his house in California to record for a studio album titled One Nation, which was intended to squash the supposed East Coast/West Coast rap conflict. Due to 2Pac's murder in September 1996, the album has never been released, though a number of tracks have leaked, most notably the title-track "One Nation" and "Military Mindz". The latter was later remixed and included on the posthumous 2Pac album Better Dayz.

In late 1996, O.G.C. released their debut album Da Storm. led by leader Starang Wondah's charismatic delivery and the tandem rhyming of Louieville Sluggah and Top Dog, the album was popular with underground fans. Though not as successful or as acclaimed as the Camp's past work, the album has still garnered claims of classic status by some. Like Nocturnal, Da Storm featured a wider number of producers, which include E-Swift, Madlib, DJ Ogee, Lord Jamar, Supreme and Shaleek, as well as the usual lineup of Beatminerz members Evil Dee, Mr. Walt and Baby Paul. Album guests included Rock of Heltah Skeltah, Sadat X of Brand Nubian, Sean Black and the Representativz. The album's lead single, "No Fear", was a minor rap hit, but failed to reach the Hot 100, making O.G.C. the only Boot Camp group without a Hot 100 hit single. The album also featured the single "Hurricane Starang" b/w "Gunn Clapp" b/w "Danjer", which failed to make any Billboard chart.

=== 1997 to 1999 ===
In 1997, the entire Boot Camp came together for the release of their first group album, For the People. Unlike Nocturnal and Da Storm, which used Da Beatminerz sparingly, on For the People the group completely abandoned them, and strayed away from their grimy, sample-heavy basement sound. Instead, Boogie Brown and Buckshot laced the album with live instrumentation production. The new sound did not go over well with fans or critics, causing the album to receive lukewarm reviews and disappointing sales. Instead of only focusing on the core Camp members, the album showcased a wide number of the group's affiliates like Illa Noyz and the Representativz, and also featured debut appearances from BJ Swan, LS, The BTJ's and F.L.O.W. The album's lead single, "Headz Are Reddee Pt. 2" b/w "Down by Law" failed to reach any Billboard singles chart.

Following the release of For the People, the Clik's groups split up once again for separate releases. Tek and Steele were the first to return, now recording under the name Cocoa Brovaz, due to a lawsuit over their previous name with the Smith & Wesson firearms company. The Rude Awakening was released in early 1998, and like the Boot Camp album, was met with mixed reviews, and failed to sell a significant number of units, despite an opening bid at #3 on the R&B/Hip-Hop charts. The singles "Won on Won" and "Bucktown USA" received very little success, and the album's lead single, the Raekwon-assisted "Black Trump", failed to reach any chart.

Heltah Skeltah followed in late 1998 with the release of their second album Magnum Force. This album was met with the Clik's harshest reviews yet, with both critics and fans accusing the duo of toning down their hardcore content for more commercial success. The album featured a large number of guest appearances, including the entire Boot Camp Clik, the Representativz, Doc Holiday, Method Man, Tha Dogg Pound, Outlawz, Anthony Hamilton and the MFC, leaving only five tracks without outside appearances. The album's lead single, "I Ain't Havin' That", utilized a sample from the A Tribe Called Quest track "Hot Sex", and became the group's second Hot 100 hit, peaking at #80 on the chart. Despite the success of the single, sales were limited.

After they split from Nervous Records, Black Moon became entangled in a legal battle with the label over the licensing of their group name, which lasted for a number of years. The case was finally settled in 1998, with Duck Down receiving permission to license the name through Nervous. After a five-year hiatus, Black Moon returned in 1999 with their second album, War Zone. The album received moderate sales and good reviews, especially when compared to the Camp's three previous efforts. One factor in its positive reception was the return of Da Beatminerz, who produced the entirety of the album. The group recruited a number of fellow New York City emcees for appearances, including Busta Rhymes, Q-Tip and M.O.P. The album's singles "Two Turntables and a Mic" and "This is What it Sounds Like (Worldwind)" received minor commercial success.

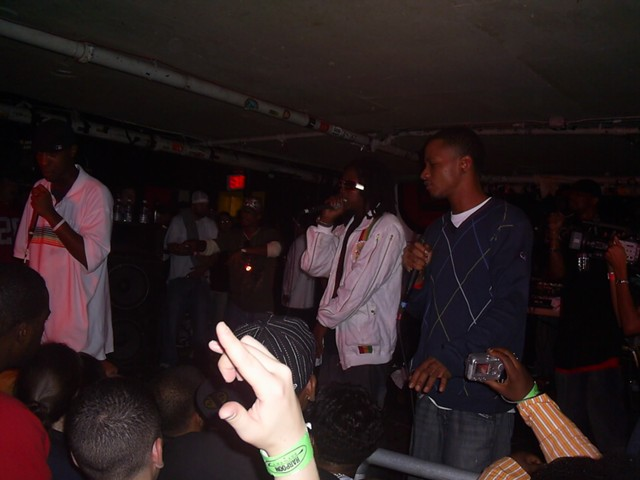
O.G.C. (Starang Wondah (left), Top Dog (center), and Louieville Sluggah (right))

O.G.C. were the last to return, releasing their second album, The M-Pire Shrikez Back, in mid-1999. Like War Zone, the album received good reviews, but little sales, and almost completely missed the radar commercially, barely cracking the Billboard 200 album chart. The album was produced by the Black Market production crew, and featured appearances from a number of Boot Camp and MFC members. The lead single, "Bounce to the Ounce" b/w "Suspect Niggaz", made little impact, peaking at #94 on the R&B/Hip-Hop charts.

Late 1999 saw the release of three more Boot Camp related albums. First, in September, a Duck Down Records compilation album, titled Duck Down Presents: The Album. The compilation received very mediocre reviews and failed to reach any Billboard album chart. The lead single, Black Moon's "Jump Up", was well accepted. In October, Buckshot released his solo debut, titled The BDI Thug, a moniker given to him by 2Pac during the summer of 1996. Like many Camp releases of its era, The BDI Thug received harsh reviews, and sold few copies, partly due to Buck's label being dropped from their distribution deal with Priority Records. Also in October, Camp affiliates the Representativz released their debut, Angels of Death, through Duck Down/Warlock Records.

=== 2000 to 2005 ===
After being dropped from their Priority distribution deal, the Clik took a lengthy hiatus from the rap game. Heltah Skeltah split-up in 2000, when Rock left Duck Down Records to pursue a solo career. O.G.C. retired (temporarily) as a trio, and has yet to release a third album. The Cocoa Brovaz signed a deal with then-leading independent rap label Rawkus Records, and released a successful single, "Get Up", from the Lyricist Lounge 2 compilation, but never released an album on the label. After dropping the group, Priority released the first Greatest Hits compilation of Boot Camp material, titled Basic Training: Boot Camp Clik's Greatest Hits, featuring 13 singles released between 1992 and 1999. Other than this, the only Clik related releases between 2000 and 2001 were a number of independent vinyl singles from various Boot Camp members.

In 2002, Duck Down Records signed a new distribution deal with Koch Entertainment, paving the way for a new Boot Camp Clik group album. The Chosen Few was released in late 2002, featuring seven of the original "Great 8", with Rock being the only absent member. The album was possibly the most acclaimed Boot Camp related release since 1996, receiving strong reviews from a number of sources, including a 4½ Star rating from Allmusic. Sales were moderately strong for an independent album, pushing over 60,000 units. The Chosen Few featured production from Da Beatminerz, as well as other star producers like Hi-Tek, The Alchemist and Bink. Videos for the album's singles "And So" and "Think Back" received rotation on BET's Rap City, and the group also hosted an episode of the program to help promote the release.

In early 2003, Duck Down Records released a compilation titled Collect Dis Edition, which was a large collection of the Camp-related singles released during their 2000–2001 album hiatus. In late 2003, Black Moon returned with their third group album, Total Eclipse. Generally well received, the majority of the album was produced by Da Beatminerz, and also featured beats from Moss, Tone Capone, DJ Static, Nottz, Kleph Dollaz and Coptic. The album featured two singles and music videos, "Stay Real" and "This Goes Out to You", the former becoming an underground hit in '03.

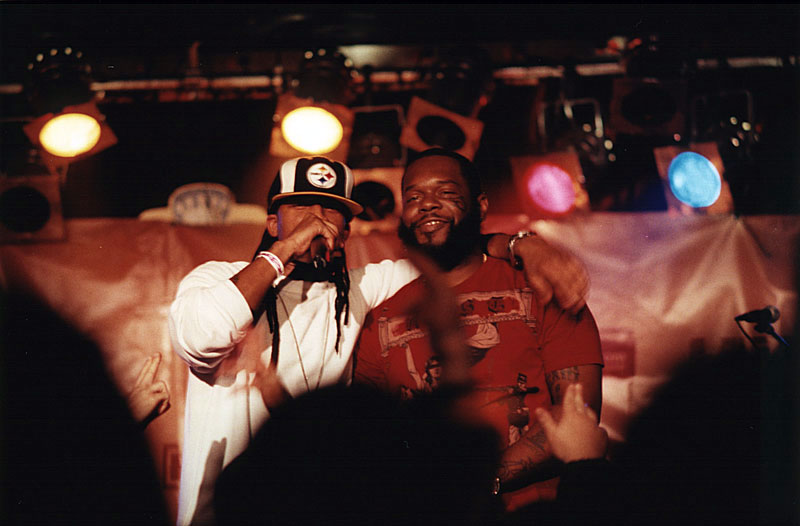
Smif-N-Wessun (Steele (left) and Tek (right)

After switching distributors from Koch to Navarre, Duck Down unveiled their 2005 "Triple Threat" campaign, featuring three new Boot Camp releases. The first was the long delayed solo debut from Heltah Skeltah's Ruck, now going by his birth name Sean Price, Monkey Barz. Largely due to Price's rough, humorous lyrics, the album was the most acclaimed of the three Triple Threat albums, and was named Independent Album of the Year by AllHipHop.com. Monkey Barz saw the reunion of Heltah Skeltah, with Rock appearing on the tracks "Jail Shit" and "Slap Boxing". The second of the Triple Threat albums was a collaboration between Buckshot and Little Brother's 9th Wonder, titled Chemistry. 9th produced all of the album's tracks while Buckshot provided the lyrics, with help from fellow Boot Camp Clik and Justus League members. The album was well-received, but did catch some mixed-reviews from underground audiences. The third and final release in the Triple Threat campaign was the long-awaited third album by Tek and Steele, who had now returned under their original moniker, Smif-N-Wessun. Smif 'N' Wessun: Reloaded was released in September 2005, and received good reviews, it featured the singles "My Timbz Do Work" and "Gunn Rap", as well as the Dead Prez collaboration "Warriorz Heart", and the Boot Camp posse-cut "Get Back". The three Triple Threat releases were met with similar sales, all reaching around 35,000-40,000 units sold.

=== 2006 to 2008 ===
In early 2006, Duck Down released a DVD titled Video Surveillance, which included nearly every Boot Camp related music video between 1992 and 2005. The single-disc release featured videos for the tracks "Who Got Da Props?", "How Many MC's...", "I Got Cha Opin (Remix)", "Buck Em Down (Remix)", "Bucktown", "Let's Git It On", "Wontime", "Wrekonize (Remix)", "Sound Bwoy Bureill", "Blah", "Leflaur Leflah Eshkoshka", both the official and an unreleased version of "Operation Lock Down", "Therapy", "No Fear", "Hurricane Danjer", "Headz Are Reddee Pt. 2", "Night Riders", "Won on Won", "Black Trump", "Spanish Harlem", "I Ain't Havin' That", "Two Turntables and a Mic", "This is What it Sounds Like (Worldwind)", "Bounce to the Ounce", "Get Up", "And So", "Think Back", "Stay Real", "This Goes Out to You", "Boom Bye Yeah", "Heartburn/Onion Head", "My Timbz Do Work" and "Gunn Rap".

In July 2006, the Boot Camp returned for their third group album, The Last Stand, featuring all eight of the original Camp members. The album was well received by fans and critics, and was also an independent success, reaching the top 50 on the R&B/Hip-Hop chart and the top 20 on the Top Independent Albums chart. The Last Stand featured an all-star production lineup, which included Da Beatminerz, Pete Rock, Large Professor, 9th Wonder, Illmind and Coptic. The first track released from the project, "Trading Places", featuring Smif-N-Wessun and Heltah Skeltah, was also the first music video from the album. "Trading Places" and "Let's Go" were the B-Side to the album's official lead single "Yeah".

2007 saw three more Clik releases. The first was Sean Price's second solo album, Jesus Price Supastar. The album was originally scheduled for released in 2006, but due to a need for increased promotion, was pushed back to an early 2007 date, and released on January 30. The album became the first Clik-related album to reach the Billboard 200 album chart since 1999, and received considerable critical acclaim. The album featured the single "P-Body", and music videos were recorded for "Mess You Made", "One" and "King Kong". The second release was the fourth group release from the Clik, titled Casualties of War, which featured leftovers from The Last Stand recording sessions. The album produced the video "BK All Day", which featured Black Moon's 5ft (recently released from prison) and Ruste Juxx. The third and final release of 2007 was the fourth studio album from Smif-N-Wessun, titled The Album, released on October 23. The Album featured the singles "Gotta Say It" and "Stomp Thru" featuring Rock and Joell Ortiz. The album saw moderate acclaim due to Tek and Steele broadened lyrical topics, but was criticized for mediocre production work. In a 2006 interview, Duck Down CEO Dru Ha announced that O.G.C. were not retired, and mentioned the possibility of a group reunion, but made no mention of any recording for a third album.

2007 also saw Duck Down Records pursuing numerous business ventures. Throughout the year, the label broadened their roster, signing deals with Special Teamz, Kidz in the Hall, KRS-One and Diamond D. In November, the group signed a deal with ESPN to record original music for their College basketball programming. The tracks "All Business" by Buckshot, "Getcha Team" by Heltah Skeltah, "Get in the Game" by Tek and "Push It" by Smif-N-Wessun will be played throughout the basketball season. In December, Buckshot was signed on to record the theme for the History Channel's Gangland series. Also in December, Duck Down joined YouTube's exclusive partnered clients list to create their own Duck Down channel on the website.

Two releases are currently scheduled for release in 2008. The first will be the second collaboration album from Buckshot and 9th Wonder, titled The Formula. The album will be released on March 18 and will feature the single "No Doubt". After officially re-signing to Duck Down as a duo, Sean Price and Rock began recording for a Heltah Skeltah reunion album, titled D.I.R.T., an acronym for "Da Incredible Rap Team". This will be the first Heltah Skeltah album released in a decade. The album is scheduled for release on Sept. 30th, 2008, and will feature production from Marco Polo, Evidence and Nottz. A number of other projects are also rumored for release. Sean Price is planning the release of his third solo album, titled Mic Tyson, as well as a collaborative album with Detroit's Black Milk and Guilty Simpson. Heltah Skeltah's Rock has been planning the release of his first solo album, tentatively titled Monstah Musik.

=== 2015 to present: The death of Sean Price ===
On August 8, 2015, Sean Price died in his sleep at the age of 43. The supergroup has not released a new album since Price's death.

== Discography ==
=== Studio albums ===
- For the People (1997)
- The Chosen Few (2002)
- The Last Stand (2006)
- Casualties of War (2007)

=== Compilation albums ===
- Duck Down Presents: The Album (1999)
- Basic Training: Boot Camp Clik's Greatest Hits (2000)
- Collect Dis Edition (2003)
