= Term Brady =

EP by Termanology
- Released: October 9, 2015
- Recorded: 2015
- Genre: Hip hop
- Length: 34:14
- Label: ST. Records, ShowOff Records
- Producer: Jon Glass; The Arcitype; Shortfyuz; Statik Selektah; 9th Wonder; ATG; DJ Premier

Termanology chronology
50 Bodies 5 (2015)	Term Brady (2015)	Cameo King III (2016)

Singles from Term Brady - EP
- 1. "Grade A" Released: September 25, 2015; 2. "World Tour" Released: October 9, 2015; 3. "Get off the Ground (DJ Premier Mix)" Released: October 13, 2015

Term Brady is an EP by American rapper Termanology. The EP was released on October 9, 2015. The EP features guest appearances from Slaine, Cyrus Deshield, Kay-R, Ransom, Wais P, Maino, Reverie, Glasses Malone, Reks, Papoose, Hannibal Stax, Justin Tyme, Ruste Juxx, Lil' Fame, and the late Sean Price.

External videos
- Termanology "Grade A" Official Video (October 5, 2015)

== Track listing ==
No.	Title	Producer(s)	Length
1.	"Term Brady"	Jon Glass	1:43
2.	"Focused" (featuring Slaine & Cyrus Deshield)	The Arcitype	3:56
3.	"Overtime" (featuring Kay-R)	Shortfyuz	5:05
4.	"Spit Real Game" (featuring Ransom)	Statik Selektah	3:09
5.	"Grade A"	9th Wonder	3:08
6.	"Ain't Coming Up Off Me" (featuring Wais P & Maino)	ATG	3:40
7.	"World Tour"	Statik Selektah	3:02
8.	"Track Two's" (featuring Glasses Malone)	Jon Glass	3:10
9.	"Get off the Ground (DJ Premier Mix)" (featuring Sean Price, Lil' Fame, Ruste Juxx, Justin Tyme, Hannibal Stax, Papoose, & Reks)	DJ Premier	7:21
10.	"A Piece of My Soul" (featuring Reverie)	The Arcitype	3:04
