= Angels of Death (Representativz album) =

Studio album by Representativz
- Released: October 19, 1999
- Recorded: 1998–99
- Studios: RRR Studios (Brooklyn, NY); 78/88 (Queens, NY)
- Genre: Hip-hop
- Length: 1:00:34
- Labels: Duck Down; Warlock
- Producers: Rock (exec.); Steele (also exec.); Bucktown USA; Cuzin Bob; Jeff Brown; John "Smoke" Turner; Shaleek; Supreme

Singles from Angels of Death
- 1. "Wanna Start" Released: 1998; 2. "Spaz Out" Released: 1999

Professional ratings
Review scores
Source	Rating
AllMusic	3/5 stars
The Source	3.5/5 stars

Angels of Death is the only studio album by American hip hop duo the Representativz. It was released on October 19, 1999, through Duck Down Records with distribution via Warlock Records. Production was handled by Bucktown USA, Cuzin Bob, Jeff Brown, Shaleek, Smoke, Steele and Supreme. It features guest appearances from Cocoa Brovaz, D. Real of the B.T.J.'s, Niggy Knock, Rock of Heltah Skeltah, Ruste Juxx, Smokelite, and Top Dog of Originoo Gunn Clappaz.

== Track listing ==
No.	Title	Writer(s)	Producer(s)	Length
1.	"You've Been Waitin" (featuring Niggy Knock)	L. Johnson; D. Muniz	Supreme	2:57
2.	"Spaz Out"	L. Johnson; D. Muniz; D. Yates Jr.	Supreme	4:27
3.	"God Degree" (featuring Rock)	L. Johnson; D. Muniz; J. Bush; D. Pearson	Supreme	3:59
4.	"Representativz"	L. Johnson; D. Muniz	Shaleek	3:48
5.	"Stand Or Fall"	L. Johnson; D. Muniz; Cuzin Bob	Cuzin Bob	3:51
6.	"Why Yall Wanna Start"	L. Johnson; D. Muniz; J. Turner	John "Smoke" Turner	4:08
7.	"Represent Baby" (featuring Rock, Cocoa Brovaz, Top Dog and D. Real)	L. Johnson; D. Muniz; J. Bush; T. Williams; D. Yates Jr.; D. Yates; D. Brown	Supreme	4:00
8.	"Do Da Math"	L. Johnson; D. Muniz; D. Yates Jr.	Supreme; Steele	4:10
9.	"The Rich" (featuring Tek)	L. Johnson; D. Muniz; T. Williams; J. Brown	Jeff Brown	4:08
10.	"Lessons 2 Learn" (featuring Steele, Smokelite and Ruste Juxx)	L. Johnson; D. Muniz; D. Yates Jr.; D. Pearson; V. Evans	Bucktown USA	3:50
11.	"Jewels"	L. Johnson; D. Muniz; D. Pearson	Shaleek	3:25
12.	"News Flash" (featuring Steele and Rock)	L. Johnson; D. Muniz; D. Yates Jr.; J. Bush	Supreme	3:38
13.	"Tell Me"	L. Johnson; D. Muniz; D. Pearson	Shaleek	6:20
14.	"Gee's Ride"	L. Johnson; D. Muniz	Supreme	4:08
15.	"Dedicated"	L. Johnson; D. Muniz	Supreme	3:51
Total length:				1:00:34

== Personnel ==
- Brian Perkins – engineering (tracks: 4, 7, 11, 14)
- DJ Peter Parker – scratches (track 8)
- Drew "Dru-Ha" Friedman – associate executive producer
- Kenyatta "Buckshot" Blake – associate executive producer
- Leo "Swift" Morris – engineering (tracks: 5, 6, 9, 15)
- Sia – assistant engineering
