= The M-Pire Shrikez Back =

Studio album by Originoo Gunn Clappaz
- Released: August 31, 1999
- Recorded: 1998–1999
- Studio: D&D Studios (New York City)
- Genre: Hip-hop
- Length: 1:06:50
- Label: Duck Down; Priority
- Producer: Buckshot (exec.); Drew "Dru-Ha" Friedman (also exec.); Baby Paul; Black Market; DJ Greyboy; Don J; Havoc; Justin "JT" Trugman; Knobody; Rebell; Shaleek; Vincent Davis

Originoo Gunn Clappaz chronology
Da Storm (1996)	The M-Pire Shrikez Back (1999)

Singles from The M-Pire Shrikez Back
- 1. "Bounce to the Ounce" Released: July 27, 1999

The M-Pire Shrikez Back is the second studio album by American hip-hop trio Originoo Gunn Clappaz. It was released on August 31, 1999, through Duck Down/Priority Records. Production was handled by Emperor Searcy, Robert "Rob" McDowell, Justin "JT" Trugman, Rebell, Baby Paul, DJ Greyboy, Don J, Drew "Dru-Ha" Friedman, Havoc, Knobody, Shaleek and Vincent Davis. It features guest appearances from Boot Camp Clik, Hardcore, Thurderfoot, Havoc and MFC.

The album peaked at number 170 on the Billboard 200. The single "Bounce to the Ounce" received moderate airplay, but not enough to attract strong sales.

== Critical reception ==
Professional ratings
Review scores
Source	Rating
AllMusic	4/5 stars
The Source	3/5 stars

Matt Conaway of AllMusic praised the album's "organic instrumentation and orchestral arrangements", but found the group's usual subject matter repetitive, adding that they are more engaging when they explore different topics. The Source's Jonathan Bonanno thought that despite "some major highlights" The M-Pire Shrikez Back failed to reach the level of the group's debut album. He commended the tracks that feature Boot Camp Clik, saying that Originoo Gunn Clappaz "shine brightest" on them, but criticized the tracks "Slo Mo" and "Set Sail" for lacking the "grimy feel of the trademark Beatminerz sound".

== Track listing ==
No.	Title	Writer(s)	Producer(s)	Length
1.	"Shoot to Kill"	J. McNair; D. Yates; B. Powell; A. Stevens	DJ Greyboy	3:12
2.	"Joe Clair (Skit)"			1:08
3.	"M-Pire Shrikes Back" (featuring Thunderfoot and Rock)	J. McNair; D. Yates; B. Powell; J. Calianno; Thunderfoot	Don J	5:02
4.	"Sometimey"	J. McNair; D. Yates; B. Powell; R. McDowell; D. Searcy	Black Market	3:15
5.	"Shit Happens"	J. McNair; D. Yates; B. Powell; R. Desoin	Rebell	3:30
6.	"Bounce to the Ounce"	J. McNair; D. Yates; B. Powell; R. McDowell; D. Searcy	Black Market	4:49
7.	"Girlz Ninety Now" (featuring the Boot Camp Clik)	J. McNair; D. Yates; B. Powell; J. Bush; S. Price; T. Williams; D. Yates Jr.; V. Davis; F. Bailey; D. Lamont	Vincent Davis; Drew "Dru-Ha" Friedman	4:41
8.	"Smokey Skit" (Bless the Mic)			1:40
9.	"The Big Ohh" (featuring Smokelite)	J. McNair; D. Yates; B. Powell; D. Pearson	Shaleek	4:29
10.	"If You Feel Like I Feel" (featuring Hardcore)	J. McNair; D. Yates; B. Powell; R. McDowell; D. Searcy; Hardcore	Black Market	4:17
11.	"Slo Mo"	J. McNair; D. Yates; B. Powell; R. Desoin	Rebell	4:30
12.	"You're Not Sure to See Tomorrow" (featuring Lil' Knock, M.S., Doc Holiday and Illa Noyz)	J. McNair; D. Yates; B. Powell; N. Williams; A. Nash; R. Duren; P. Hendricks; D. Axelrod	Baby Paul	4:55
13.	"From the Table to the Label (Skit)"			1:53
14.	"Suspect Niggaz" (featuring Buckshot and Havoc)	J. McNair; D. Yates; B. Powell; K. Blake; K. Muchita	Havoc	4:38
15.	"Dirtiest Players in the Game" (featuring The Fab 5)	J. McNair; D. Yates; B. Powell; J. Bush; S. Price; J. Trugman; T. Furlong	Justin "JT" Trugman	5:34
16.	"Set Sail"	J. McNair; D. Yates; B. Powell; J. Trugman; E. Gale	Justin "JT" Trugman	4:06
17.	"Boot Camp MFC Eastern Conference" (featuring the Boot Camp Clik, Representativz, Doc Holiday and Smokelite)	J. McNair; D. Yates; B. Powell; T. Williams; D. Yates Jr.; J. Bush; S. Price; D. Muniz; L. Johnson; R. Duren; J. Foster; Smokelite	Knobody	5:11
Total length:				1:06:50

== Charts ==
Chart (1999)	Peak position
US Billboard 200	170
US Top R&B/Hip-Hop Albums (Billboard)	38
