= The BDI Thug =

Studio album by Buckshot
- Released: October 26, 1999
- Recorded: 1998–1999
- Studio: D&D
- Genres: Gangsta rap; hardcore hip hop
- Length: 59:53
- Label: Duck Down
- Producers: Drew "Dru-Ha" Friedman (exec.); Buckshot (also exec.); Baby Paul; Chris Ward; DJ Akshun; Just Blaze; Lord Jamar; Mark "Boogie" Brown; Master Beats

Buckshot chronology
The BDI Thug (1999)	Chemistry (2005)

Singles from The BDI Thug
- 1. "Rock With Me / Take It To The Streets" Released: 1999

Professional ratings
Review scores
Source	Rating
AllMusic	2/5 stars
RapReviews	3/10
The Source	3.5/5 stars

The BDI Thug is the first studio album by American rapper Buckshot. It was released on October 26, 1999, via Duck Down Records. Production was handled by Mark "Boogie" Brown, Baby Paul, Chris Ward, DJ Akshun, Just Blaze, Lord Jamar, Master Beats and Buckshot himself, who also served as executive producer together with Drew "Dru-Ha" Friedman. It features guest appearances from BJ Swan, Blue Flame, FT, Half a Mill, Harly Hearts, Sweet Mellodye, Tone Capone and Top Dog. The album peaked at number 63 on the Top R&B/Hip-Hop Albums and number 21 on the Heatseekers Albums in the United States.

The album's title came from the nickname Tupac Shakur gave to Buckshot in the summer of 1996 during the recording of the unreleased 2Pac's One Nation album.

== Track listing ==
No.	Title	Writer(s)	Producer(s)	Length
1.	"Intro" (Games People Play)	K. Blake; J. Truluck	Boogie Brown	1:03
2.	"Follow With Pride"	K. Blake; M. Brown	Boogie Brown	4:54
3.	"Ladies N Gentlemen"	K. Blake; L. DeChalus	Lord Jamar	4:25
4.	"My Bitches & My Niggaz" (featuring Harly Hearts)	K. Blake; M. Brown	Boogie Brown	4:24
5.	"Trapped"	K. Blake; R. Williams	DJ Akshun	5:11
6.	"Take It to the Streets" (featuring Half-A-Mill, Swan and Blue Flame)	K. Blake; C. Ward	Master Beats	4:58
7.	"I'll Be Damned" (featuring Swan)	K. Blake; D. Benoit; M. Brown	Boogie Brown	4:37
8.	"Heavy Weighters" (featuring F.T. and Swan)	K. Blake; W. Morris; D. Benoit; J. Smith	Just Blaze	4:08
9.	"Glide With Me" (featuring Swan)	K. Blake; D. Benoit; M. Brown	Boogie Brown	5:00
10.	"Take Your Time" (featuring Swan and Jessica Darby)	K. Blake; D. Benoit; M. Brown	Boogie Brown; Buckshot	4:54
11.	"Breath Control"	K. Blake; P. Hendricks	Baby Paul	4:27
12.	"Boom Bye Bye" (featuring Top Dog)	K. Blake; D. Yates; P. Hendricks	Baby Paul; Buckshot^{[a]}	3:51
13.	"Feel It" (featuring Swan, Sweet Mellodye and Tone Capone)	K. Blake; D. Benoit; M. Green; C. Ward; A. Greene	Chris Ward	4:12
14.	"Final Words"	K. Blake; C. Ward	Chris Ward	3:49
Total length:				59:53

Notes

- ^{^[a]} signifies an additional producer

== Personnel ==
- Kenyatta "Buckshot" Blake – executive producer
- Drew "Dru-Ha" Friedman – executive producer
- Leo "Swift" Morris – engineering (tracks: 2, 11)
- Ed Miller – engineering (tracks: 3, 7, 10, 12)
- Ronald Williams – engineering & mixing (track 5)
- Ken Lewis – engineering (track 8)
- DJ Eli – engineering (track 9)
- Michael Sarsfield – mastering
- Andre Simmons – artwork, design
- Marc Ecko – artwork, design
- Jen Petrashock – photography

== Charts ==
Chart (1999)	Peak position
US Top R&B/Hip-Hop Albums (Billboard)	63
US Heatseekers Albums (Billboard)	21
