= Magnum Force (album) =

Studio album by Heltah Skeltah
- Released: October 13, 1998
- Recorded: 1997−1998
- Studio: D&D Studios (New York, NY)
- Genre: East Coast hip hop; hardcore hip hop
- Length: 1:08:38
- Label: Duck Down/Priority/EMI; 0499 2 53543 2 4 P2-53543
- Producer: Rock (also exec.); Cuzin Bob; Daz Dillinger; Grand Daddy I.U.; John "Smoke" Turner; Justin "JT" Trugman; Mike Caren; Moe Stewart; NOD; Punch; Self; Starang Wondah; Supreme

Heltah Skeltah chronology
Nocturnal (1996)	Magnum Force (1998)	D.I.R.T. (Da Incredible Rap Team) (2008)

Singles from Magnum Force
- 1. "I Ain't Havin' That" Released: 1998

Professional ratings
Review scores
Source	Rating
AllMusic	2/5 stars
RapReviews	8/10
The Source	3/5 stars

Magnum Force is the second studio album by the American hip hop duo Heltah Skeltah. It was released on October 13, 1998, through Duck Down/Priority Records.

After the release of their acclaimed 1996 debut, Nocturnal, Rock and Ruck (who later became known as Sean Price) recorded an album titled For the People, with its crew, the Boot Camp Clik, in 1997. They followed up in 1998 with their second full-length, which received harsh reviews, and accusations of the duo toning down its content to receive more sales. The album is the first solo BCC album to feature no production work from Da Beatminerz and second overall after For the People. Despite the success of the single "I Ain't Havin' That", the album received mediocre sales, which led the duo to a temporary break up.

== Track listing ==
No.	Title	Writer(s)	Producer(s)	Length
1.	"Worldwide (Rock the World)"	S. Price; J. Bush; E. Hinson	Self	3:58
2.	"Call of the Wild" (featuring Representativz, Starang Wondah, Hardcore and Doc Holiday)	S. Price; J. Bush; D. Muniz; L. Johnson; J. McNair; C. Borden; R. Duren; E. Hinson	Self	4:26
3.	"Gunz 'N Onez (Iz U wit Me)" (featuring Method Man)	S. Price; J. Bush; C. Smith; J. Turner	John "Smoke" Turner	4:17
4.	"Perfect Jab" (featuring Supreme)	J. Bush; D. Muniz	Rock; Supreme	4:09
5.	"Call Tyrone" (Skit)			1:29
6.	"Chicka Woo" (featuring Mike Stewart)	S. Price; J. Bush; M. Stewart; J. Etienne; M. Harper	NOD; Punch	4:14
7.	"I Ain't Havin' That" (featuring Starang Wondah and Doc Holiday)	S. Price; J. Bush; J. McNair; R. Duren	Cuzin Bawb; Starang Wondah	5:05
8.	"2 Keys I" (Skit)			1:02
9.	"Brownsville II Long Beach" (featuring Tha Dogg Pound)	S. Price; J. Bush; R. Brown; D. Arnaud	Daz Dillinger	5:32
10.	"2 Keys II" (Skit)			0:21
11.	"Magnum Force" (featuring Ruste Juxx and Representativz)	S. Price; J. Bush; V. Evans; D. Muniz; L. Johnson; A. Cave	Grand Daddy I.U.	5:14
12.	"2 Keys III" (Skit)			0:49
13.	"Sean Wigginz"	S. Price; J. Etienne	NOD	1:53
14.	"Forget Me Knots"	S. Price; J. Bush; A. Cave	Grand Daddy I.U.	4:18
15.	"Black Fonzerelliz"	S. Price; J. Bush; M. Caren; M. White; C. Scarborough	Mike Caren	3:26
16.	"Do the Knowledge" (Skit)			0:51
17.	"M.F.C. Lawz" (featuring Young Noble, Storm, Napoleon and Doc Holiday)	S. Price; J. Bush; R. Cooper III; D. Hunter; M. Beale; R. Duren; J. Trugman; M. Stewart	Justin "JT" Trugman; Moe Stewart	4:51
18.	"Hold Your Head Up" (featuring Anthony Hamilton)	S. Price; J. Bush; A. Hamilton; J. Etienne	NOD	3:35
19.	"Gang's All Here" (featuring Boot Camp Clik and MFC)	S. Price; J. Bush; N. Williams; D. Yates; W. Evans; D. Yates Jr.; R. Duren; D. Muniz; L. Johnson; V. Evans; T. Williams; J. McNair; K. Blake; B. Powell	John "Smoke" Turner	9:08
Total length:				1:08:38

== Charts ==
Chart (1998)	Peak position
US Billboard 200	34
US Top R&B/Hip-Hop Albums (Billboard)	8
