= MTV: The First 1000 Years: Hip Hop =

1999 compilation album

Compilation album by Various
- Released: November 2, 1999
- Genre: Alternative hip hop, gangsta rap, hardcore hip hop, Southern hip hop, G-funk, Golden age hip hop, pop-rap, West Coast hip hop
- Length: 69:05
- Label: Rhino Records

Professional ratings
Review scores
Source	Rating
Allmusic	4/5 stars

MTV: The First 1000 Years: Hip Hop is a compilation album of hip hop songs, released by Rhino Entertainment on November 2, 1999.

== Track listing ==
No.	Title	Length
1.	"The Message" (Grandmaster Flash and the Furious Five)	4:44
2.	"Walk This Way" (Run–D.M.C.)	3:39
3.	"Colors" (Ice-T)	3:59
4.	"Wild Thing" (Tone Lōc)	4:24
5.	"Express Yourself" (N.W.A)	4:24
6.	"The Humpty Dance" (Digital Underground)	4:40
7.	"Jump Around" (House of Pain)	3:37
8.	"Tennessee" (Arrested Development)	4:33
9.	"Who Am I (What's My Name)?" (Snoop Doggy Dogg)	4:16
10.	"Rebirth of Slick (Cool Like Dat)" (Digable Planets)	4:21
11.	"It Was a Good Day" (Ice Cube)	4:21
12.	"Nuthin' but a 'G' Thang" (Dr. Dre)	3:56
13.	"Fantastic Voyage" (Coolio)	4:03
14.	"Player's Ball" (Outkast)	4:22
15.	"California Love" (2Pac)	4:45
16.	"Make 'Em Say Uhh!" (Master P)	5:01
Total length:		69:05
