= Ruste Juxx =

American rapper

- Born: Victor Evans; January 20, 1978 (age 48); Brooklyn, New York City, U.S.
- Genres: Hip Hop
- Occupation: Rapper
- Years active: 1998–present
- Labels: Duck Down; Blaze My Fire; Tenement Music

Victor Evans (born January 20, 1978), better known by his stage name Ruste Juxx, is an American rapper.

He is originally from Crown Heights, Brooklyn. He was a protege of Sean Price, and a frequent guest rapper on Duck Down Music recordings. His first appearance was on the song "Magnum Force" off Heltah Skeltah's Magnum Force.

He released his debut album, Indestructible, in 2008 through Duck Down Music. It was executive produced by Sean Price, and producers included Marco Polo and Black Milk. He subsequently collaborated with Marco Polo on the 2010 album The Exxecution.

== Discography ==
=== Studio albums ===
- Indestructible (2008)
- The Exxecution (2010) (with Marco Polo)
- Adamantine (2010)
- Hardbodie Hip Hop (2012) (with Kyo Itachi)
- V.I.C. (2012) (with The Arcitype)
- Ready to Juxx (2013) (with VSTheBest)
- Def by Stereo (2016) (with Beat Bruisers and Pawz One)
- Meteorite (2016) (with Kyo Itachi)
- International Juxx (2017)
- Jake and the Juxxman (2018) (with Jake Palumbo)
- King of Crime Heights (2018) (with Raticus)
- Magma (2019) (with Tone Spliff)
- Culturally Rich (2019)
- Sulfuric Acid (2020) (with Zealot of FWM)
- James Brown of the Underground (2020) (with Amadeus 360 The Beat King)

=== Mixtapes ===
- Reign of Destruction (2005)

=== EPs ===
- Black Son Rise (2015) (with Omen44 and Noriq)

=== Singles ===
- "Nobody" / "Rearview" (2010)
- "Ginsu-Sharp" (2018)
- "One Day Baby (Prod. TooBusy)'" (2020)
- "Down (Prod. TooBusy)'" (2020)
- "One For The Team (Prod. TooBusy)" (2021)

=== Guest appearances ===
- Heltah Skeltah - "Magnum Force" from Magnum Force (1998)
- Representativz - "Lessons 2 Learn" from Angels of Death (1999)
- Sean Price - "Spliff n Wessun" and "Slap Boxing" from Monkey Barz (2005)
- Sean Price - "Cardiac" from Jesus Price Supastar (2007)
- Heltah Skeltah - "So Damn Tuff" from D.I.R.T. (Da Incredible Rap Team) (2008)
- Sean Price - "Price & Shining Armor" from Mic Tyson (2012)
- Mike ADHD - "Bang to the Death ft Fes Taylor, Ruste Juxx, Kromeatose and Solomon Childs" from Single (2013)
- Hex One & 5th Element - "Dinner Time" ft Ruste Juxx and Halfcut from Hologramz (2014)
- Termanology - "Get Off the Ground (DJ Premier Mix)" from Term Brady - EP (2015)
- Andgo & Nguema Ndong - B2M Connection - from CLAMP 2 (2017)
- Sean Price - "Ape in His Apex" from Imperius Rex (2017)
