= D.I.R.T. (Da Incredible Rap Team) =

Studio album by Heltah Skeltah
- Released: September 30, 2008
- Recorded: 2007–08
- Genre: East Coast hip-hop; hardcore hip-hop; underground hip-hop
- Length: 50:40
- Label: Duck Down Records
- Producer: Buckshot (exec.); Drew "Dru-Ha" Friedman (exec.); Illmind; Khrysis; Stu Bangas; 10 For The Triad; Deric "D-Dot" Angelettie; Double Up; Evidence; Marco Polo; M-Phazes; Sic Beats; Soul Theory

Heltah Skeltah chronology
Magnum Force (1998)	D.I.R.T. (Da Incredible Rap Team) (2008)

Professional ratings
Review scores
Source	Rating
HipHopDX	3.5/5
laut.de	3/5 stars
RapReviews	6.5/10

D.I.R.T. (Da Incredible Rap Team) is the third and final studio album by American hip-hop duo Heltah Skeltah. It was released on September 30, 2008 via Duck Down Music, making it their first album in ten years since the release of Magnum Force in 1998.

Production was handled by Illmind, Khrysis, Stu Bangas, 10 For The Triad, Deric "D-Dot" Angelettie, Double Up, Evidence, Marco Polo, M-Phazes, Sic Beats and Soul Theory, with Buckshot and Drew "Dru-Ha" Friedman serving as executive producers. It features guest appearances from Buckshot, Flood, Representativz, Ruste Juxx and Smif-N-Wessun.

The album did not receive as much critical acclaim and underground success as their previous albums, reaching number 122 on the US Billboard 200, number 35 on the Top R&B/Hip-Hop Albums, and number 21 on the Independent Albums.

Music videos were released for "Everything Is Heltah Skeltah" and "Ruck N Roll".

== Track listing ==
No.	Title	Producer(s)	Length
1.	"Intro" (featuring DonRocko, YoungJamen, BummyFlyJab and Alkatraz)	Deric "D-Dot" Angelettie	2:37
2.	"Everything Is Heltah Skeltah"	Illmind	3:03
3.	"The Art of Disrespekinazation"	Khrysis	3:54
4.	"Da Beginning of Da End"	10 For The Triad	3:27
5.	"Twinz"	Soul Theory	3:16
6.	"D.I.R.T. (Another Boot Camp Clik Yeah Song)"	Khrysis	3:52
7.	"So Damn Tuff" (featuring Buckshot and Ruste Juxx)	Illmind	4:07
8.	"Insane"	Marco Polo	4:24
9.	"W.M.D." (featuring Smif-N-Wessun)	M-Phazes	3:15
10.	"That's Incredible"	Double Up	4:12
11.	"Ape Food" (featuring Representativz)	Stu Bangas	3:22
12.	"Hellz Kitchen"	Evidence	4:09
13.	"Smack Muzik" (featuring Flood)	Sic Beats	3:09
14.	"Ruck N Roll"	Stu Bangas	3:54
Total length:			50:40

== Charts ==
Chart (2008)	Peak position
US Billboard 200	122
US Top R&B/Hip-Hop Albums (Billboard)	35
US Independent Albums (Billboard)	21
