= Duck Down Music =

American record label

- Parent company: INgrooves
- Founded: 1995
- Founder: Drew "Dru-Ha" Friedman; Kenyatta "Buckshot" Blake
- Distributor: Fontana
- Genre: Hip hop
- Country of origin: U.S.
- Location: New York City, New York, U.S.
- Official website: www.duckdown.com

Duck Down Music Inc is a New York City based record label, talent management, music-marketing, and consulting company founded by Drew "Dru-Ha" Friedman and Kenyatta "Buckshot" Blake in 1995. In Duck Down's 30-year existence, the company has released over 40 albums and sold more than 3 million collective copies worldwide. Home of established hip hop artists such as Boot Camp Clik, Pharoahe Monch, Black Rob, 9th Wonder, KRS-One, B-Real of Cypress Hill, The Away Team, Statik Selektah, Random Axe, Promise, David Dallas, Marco Polo, Ruste Juxx, Torae, Blue Scholars, Special Teamz (Slaine of La Coka Nostra, Edo G., Jaysaun, DJ Jayceeoh) and Kidz in the Hall.

== History ==
Duck Down (whose name derived from Boogie Down Productions' 1992 hit single of the same name) was originally established as a management company in 1994 to manage the careers of Buckshot's group Black Moon and Smif-N-Wessun. In 1995, co-owners Drew "Dru Ha" Friedman and Kenyatta "Buckshot" Blake launched Duck Down Music. After successful debut releases from Black Moon (Enta da Stage) and Smif-N-Wessun (Dah Shinin'), Duck Down entered into a label distribution deal with Priority Records, at the time EMI's top hip hop label, which was home of N.W.A and Master P's No Limit Records. Within the first year of the deal, Dru Ha & Buckshot introduced its two newest acts simultaneously: Heltah Skeltah and O.G.C. merging the two groups, forming a quintet, which they dubbed the Fab Five. At Priority/EMI, Duck Down eventually brought over the rest of its core roster, which consisted of the Boot Camp Clik, members: Black Moon, Smif-N-Wessun, Heltah Skeltah, and O.G.C.. They released nine albums with Priority Records between 1995 and 2000.

In 2002, Duck Down entered a new physical distribution partnership with Navarre Corporation for their CD and DVD products in the U.S. and Canada. Duck Down retained its Digital Distribution rights and has its own direct deal with iTunes. Duck Down produces, manufactures and markets its products independently.

In 2005, Duck Down released Monkey Barz (Sean Price's solo debut), Chemistry (a collaborative album between Buckshot & producer 9th Wonder) and Smif 'n' Wessun: Reloaded. Collectively, the three albums cover Artwork was created by clothing designer Marc Ecko and marketed under the campaign: "Triple Threat".

In 2007, Duck Down switched distribution to Koch Records (now E1 Music) and began expanding its roster as they released albums from Special Teamz's 2007 Stereotypez, Kidz in the Hall's 2008 The In Crowd and 2010 Land of Make Believe, as well as Cypress Hill's front man B-Real's 2009 solo LP Smoke N Mirrors and KRS-One & Buckshot's 2009 Survival Skills - represented a few examples of albums showing the labels growing diversity.

In 2011, in addition to releasing Pharoahe Monch's W.A.R. (We Are Renegades) album, Duck Down Music formed 3D, a music-marketing and consulting firm with its own distribution network that's experienced in navigating the indie landscape. Executing a strategy where 3D provides General Management for Artist-owned indie sub-labels such as Talib Kweli's Javotti Media (Gutter Rainbows) and Blue Scholars. This allowed artists to tap into 3D's expertise, relationships, and networks, while retaining control of their projects and ownerships of their masters. Expanded services from 3D are a Music Supervision Department that places clients songs in film, TV, and video games and creation and sales of Artist Merchandising.

2012, saw the releases of Sean Price’s highly anticipated Mic Tyson album, Skyzoo’s A Dream Deferred,’ 9th Wonder & Buckshot's 3rd collaborative album and releases from acts Murs & Fashawn and De La Soul’s Plug 1 & Plug 2. 2012 also saw the launch of Duck Down Visuals, a production division dedicated to documenting various artists and the lifestyle of their music through self-produced visual shorts. This included several viral Sean Price skits, profiles on up and coming acts; Freddie Gibbs, Ab-Soul etc., and special series like Verse Unheard.

In 2013, Duck Down Music was retained as project management for Talib Kweli's latest album, Prisoner of Conscious, distributed by EMI Label Services. Overseeing album deliverables, allocation of budget, co-op approvals, international distribution & overall marketing. Duck Down Music's 3D Division was also retained to consult for Cinematic Music Group assisting with Joey Bada$$ project management services with their distributor RED Distribution.

== Music licensing ==
As of 2011, Duck Down has placed its artists' songs and original compositions on several notable TV shows (ESPN's Men's College Basketball programming, ESPN's SportsCenter, HBO's Hard Knocks & Entourage, MTV's Jersey Shore & Station Zero, CSI, The History Channel's Gangland, VH1's Basketball Wives, and more).

Other promotions include video Game placements (Activision's Call of Duty: Modern Warfare 2, Tony Hawk: Ride, Madden NFL 09, NBA 2K11, Rockstar Games' Midnight Club: Los Angeles and more), movie placement (Limitless), and national brand campaigns (Smirnoff, Belvédère).

== Notable marketing campaigns ==
Duck Down's artists have previously aligned with several notable brands for their lifestyle and grassroots marketing campaigns such as Scion, Rockstar Games, Coca-Cola, Microsoft Zune, Pepsi Max, VTech, Reebok, and more.

In 2010 and 2011, Duck Down partnered with 2K Sports to present a unique opportunity for aspiring producers and MCs. This involved an open call for submissions for original sample-free compositions for a chance to receive placement in the NBA 2K's game soundtrack (NBA 2K11 and NBA 2K12) and a trip to NYC to perform at Duck Down's CMJ Showcase.

For NBA 2K12, the winners were the music producer/composer Alex Kresovich for his instrumental "The Return" (Ithaca, NY) and the rap group D.J.I.G. (Glassboro, New Jersey) for their song "Now's My Time" recorded over Alex's instrumental. Alex Kresovich's instrumental "The Return" was also used for the music in the debut commercial for NBA 2K12 which aired on May 31, 2011, during Game 1 of the NBA Finals between the Miami Heat and Dallas Mavericks.

- Boot Camp Clik (Buckshot, Smif-N-Wessun, Heltah Skeltah, O.G.C.)
- B-Real
- Black Moon
- Black Rob
- Blue Scholars
- Bodega Bamz
- 9th Wonder
- Chelsea Reject
- Dope D.O.D. (Skits Vicious (MC), Dopey Rotten (MC), Jay Reaper (MC), Dr. Diggles (DJ), Peter Songolo (Record producer))
- Kidz in the Hall
- KRS-One
- Marco Polo
- Pharoahe Monch
- Representativz
- Statik Selektah
- Team Facelift
- The Away Team
- De La Soul's Plug 1 & Plug 2 Present First Serve

== Discography ==
1996

- Heltah Skeltah - Nocturnal
- O.G.C. - Da Storm

1997

- Boot Camp Clik - For the People

1998

- Cocoa Brovaz - The Rude Awakening
- Heltah Skeltah - Magnum Force

1999

- Black Moon - War Zone
- O.G.C. - The M-Pire Shrikez Back
- Various Artists - Duck Down Presents: The Album
- Buckshot- The BDI Thug
- Representativz - Angels of Death

2000

- Boot Camp Clik - Basic Training: Boot Camp Clik's Greatest Hits

2002

- Boot Camp Clik - The Chosen Few
- Various Artists - Collect Dis Edition

2003

- Buckshot - The BDI Thug (expanded re-released version)
- Black Moon - Total Eclipse

2005

- Sean Price- Monkey Barz
- Buckshot & 9th Wonder - Chemistry
- Smif-N-Wessun - Smif 'N' Wessun: Reloaded
- Black Moon - War Zone Revisited (expanded re-released version)

2006

- Boot Camp Clik - The Last Stand

2007

- Sean Price - Jesus Price Supastar
- Boot Camp Clik - Still For the People (For the People re-release)
- Boot Camp Clik -Casualties of War
- Special Teamz - Stereotypez
- Smif-N-Wessun - Smif-n-Wessun: The Album

2008

- Buckshot & 9th Wonder - The Formula
- Kidz in the Hall - The In Crowd
- Heltah Skeltah - D.I.R.T.
- DJ Revolution - Kings of the Decks
- Ruste Juxx - Indestructible

2009

- B-Real -Smoke N Mirrors
- Torae & Marco Polo - Double Barrel
- Steele of Smif-N-Wessun - Welcome to Bucktown
- Blue Scholars - OOF! EP
- Blue Scholars - Bayani Redux
- KRS-One & Buckshot - Survival Skills (album)
- Skyzoo - The Salvation

2010

- Steele of Smif-N-Wessun - AmeriKKKa's Nightmire Part 2: Children of War
- Kidz in the Hall - Land of Make Believe
- Marco Polo & Ruste Juxx - The eXXecution
- Marco Polo - The Stupendous Adventures of Marco Polo
- Various Artists - 15 Years Of Duck Down
- Skyzoo & Illmind - Live from the Tape Deck

2011

- Promise - Awakening
- Pharoahe Monch - W.A.R. (We Are Renegades)
- Random Axe (Sean Price, Guilty Simpson, and Black Milk) - Random Axe
- Pete Rock & Smif-N-Wessun - Monumental
- Black Rob - Game Tested, Streets Approved
- The Away Team - Scars & Stripes
- David Dallas - The Rose Tint
- Statik Selektah - Population Control
- Kidz in the Hall - Occasion

2012

- De La Soul's Plug 1 & Plug 2 - First Serve
- Ruste Juxx & The Arcitype - V.I.C. (Victorious Impervious Champions)
- Murs & Fashawn - This Generation
- Skyzoo - A Dream Deferred
- Sean Price - Mic Tyson
- Buckshot & 9th Wonder - The Solution

2013

- P-Money - Gratitude
- Statik Selektah - Extended Play
- Smif-N-Wessun - Born and Raised
- Dope D.O.D. - Da Roach

2014

- Buckshot & P-Money - Backpack Travels
- Statik Selektah - What Goes Around...

2015

- Bodega Bamz - Sidewalk Exec
- Chelsea Reject - CMPLX
- Statik Selektah - Lucky 7

2020

- Ruste Juxx & Amadeus360theBeatKing - James Brown of the Underground

=== Mix CDs ===
- 2002: Boot Camp Clik & DJ Peter Parker Search And Recover Part 1
- 2004: Smif-N-Wessun & DJ Revolution Still Shinin
- 2004: Sean Price Donkey Sean Jr
- 2004: Boot Camp Clik & DJ Evil Dee Search And Recover Part 2
- 2005: DJ Bucktown Blastin' Off Vol. 1
- 2005: Boot Camp Clik & DJ Tony Touch Best of BCC Freestyles
- 2005: DJ Logic (DJ Master Nash) Rap Center
- 2006: Black Moon - Alter the Chemistry
- 2006: Smif-N-Wessun X-Files Official Mix
- 2006: Boot Camp Clik & DJ Sherazta Search And Recover Part 3
- 2006: Steele America Nightmare
- 2006: Tek Famlee First Mix CD - Vol. 1
- 2006: Tek I Got This
- 2006: DJ Bucktown Blastin' Off Vol.2
- 2007: Steele Hotstyle Takeover
- 2007: Sean Price Master P
- 2007: Ruste Juxx Reign of Destruction
- 2007: Supreme The Perfect Weapon
- 2008: Rock Shell Shock
- 2008: Duck Down Hotline
- 2008: Ruste Juxx The Prelude Mixtape
- 2009: Naledge of Kidz in the Hall Chicago Picasso
- 2009: Steele Welcome To Bucktown
- 2009: Sean Price Kimbo Price
- 2010: Tek 24KT Smoke
- 2010: Rock Rockin Out West
- 2010: Ruste Juxx Adamantine
- 2011: David Dallas The Rose Tint
- 2011: SkyzooThe Great Debater
- 2011: The Best of Duck Down Music 2011
- 2012: Skyzoo Theo Vs. J.J.
- 2020: Ruste Juxx & Amadeus360TheBeatKing James Brown of the Underground
