= Sean Price =

American rapper (1972–2015)

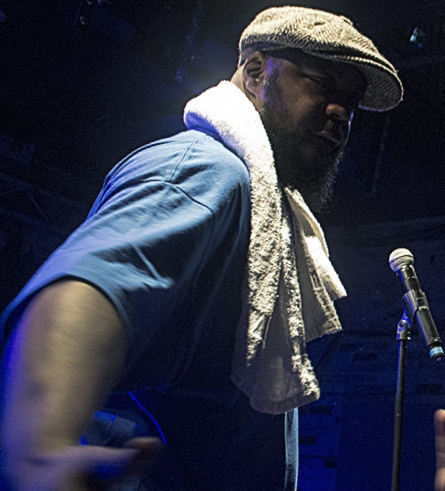
- Price performing in 2013

Background information
- Also known as: Ruck, P
- Born: Sean Duval Price; March 17, 1972; New York City, U.S.
- Died: August 8, 2015 (aged 43) New York City, U.S.
- Genre: East Coast hip-hop
- Occupations: Rapper; songwriter; record producer
- Works: Sean Price discography
- Years active: 1992–2015
- Label: Duck Down
- Formerly of: Boot Camp Clik; Heltah Skeltah

Sean Duval Price (March 17, 1972 – August 8, 2015) was an American rapper and member of the hip-hop collective Boot Camp Clik. He was one half of the duo Heltah Skeltah, performing under the name Ruck, along with partner Rock.

== Early life and education ==
Growing up in the borough of Brooklyn, Price was a member of the Decepticons in high school.

== Career ==
A member of the underground hip-hop collective Boot Camp Clik, Price first appeared on Smif-N-Wessun's 1995 album Dah Shinin'. He would soon resurface in 1996 as one half of the critically acclaimed Brooklyn duo Heltah Skeltah, who released their debut album Nocturnal on Duck Down Records that year. Heltah Skeltah would go on to release two more albums: 1998's Magnum Force and 2008's D.I.R.T..

In the 2000s, Price established himself as a strong force in the underground hip-hop community. He was featured on Grand Theft Auto 3's GAME FM radio station in 2001. In 2005, Price released his first solo album Monkey Barz, to critical acclaim. He followed this in 2007 with Jesus Price Supastar and Mic Tyson in 2012.

Price was interviewed on the online series Grand Angel TV in 2008 and 2010, with Paid Dues performance footage alongside Boot Camp Clik and Dru Ha, respectively.

In 2011, Price was a judge on the Ultimate MC TV show alongside Royce da 5'9", Organik, Planet Asia, and Pharoahe Monch. Also in 2011, he formed the group Random Axe with Guilty Simpson and producer Black Milk.

He had a planned collaborative album with rapper Ill Bill in the works, called The Pill. Songs in the Key of Price, a mixtape recorded before Price's death, was released posthumously on August 21, 2015. The posthumous release of his fourth studio album, Imperius Rex, followed in August 2017.

Other posthumous releases include Price's verse on fellow rapper Bruse Wane's 2016 song "Venom", which also featured Big Pun's son Chris Rivers. Dj Premier posted "Venom" on his website Premier Wuz Here, and acknowledged Price's guest appearance as "likely his last guest verse". The song was declared "an instant classic" by HIPHOPDX.

== Death ==
On August 8, 2015, Price died at his apartment in Brooklyn at the age of 43. A statement from his label Duck Down Music confirmed his death, while adding that he died in his sleep, it also stated that his cause of death is unknown. Price had three children.

== Personal life ==
Price was a cousin of Roc-A-Fella Records rapper Memphis Bleek and actor Michael K. Williams. He was also close friends with actor Ryan Phillippe.

Price lived in Brownsville, Brooklyn. He was a Muslim, having converted in 2009.

== Discography ==
Studio albums

- Monkey Barz (2005)
- Jesus Price Supastar (2007)
- Mic Tyson (2012)
- Imperius Rex (2017)
- 86 Witness (2019)
- Price Of Fame (2019)
