= O.G.C. =

American hip-hop group

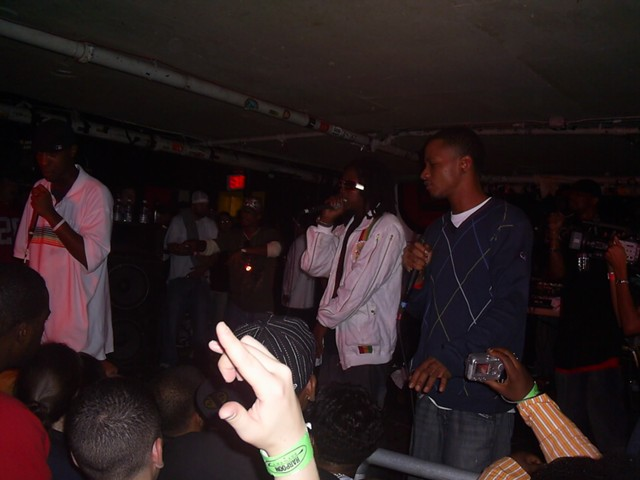
- O.G.C. in 2007: Starang Wondah (left), Top Dog (center) and Louieville

Background information
- Also known as: The 3 Amigos; 3-2-1
- Origin: Brooklyn, New York City, U.S.
- Genres: Hip-hop
- Years active: 1994–present
- Labels: Duck Down; Priority
- Members: Starang Wondah; Louieville Sluggah; Top Dog

O.G.C. (an initialism for Originoo Gunn Clappaz) is an American hip-hop trio composed of members Jack "Starang Wondah" Mcnair, Barret "Louieville Sluggah" Powell and Dashawn "Top Dog" Yates. The group is primarily known through their membership in the Boot Camp Clik, along with Buckshot, Smif-N-Wessun and Heltah Skeltah.

Post O.G.C., Louieville Sluggah released 2 albums, Dinner Time & Best Kept Secret.

== Discography ==
Studio albums

- Da Storm (1996)
- The M-Pire Shrikez Back (1999)

=== Singles ===
Title	Year	Peak chart positions					Album
Title	Year	US R&B/HH Sales	US Dance Sales	US Bub.	US R&B/HH	US Rap	Album
"Blah"/"Leflah" (with Heltah Skeltah, as The Fab 5)	1995	—	—	—	—	—	Nocturnal
"No Fear"	1996	40	11	15	63	13	Da Storm
"Hurricane Starang"	1997	—	—	—	—	—	Da Storm
"Bounce to the Ounce"	1999	30	—	—	94	11	The M-Pire Shrikez Back
"Shoot to Kill"/"Girlz Ninety Now"	1999	—	—	—	—	—	The M-Pire Shrikez Back
