= Heltah Skeltah =

American hip-hop duo

- Heltah Skeltah in 2007: Ruck (left) and Rock (center) with Ruste Juxx

Background information
- Also known as: Sparsky & Dutch
- Origin: Brooklyn, New York City, U.S.
- Genres: Hip hop; East Coast hip hop; hardcore hip hop
- Years active: 1994–2000; 2005–2015
- Label: Duck Down
- Past members: Rock; Ruck

Heltah Skeltah was an American hip hop duo that consisted of rappers Jahmal "Rock" Bush and Sean "Ruck" Price. The two were also members of New York supergroup Boot Camp Clik, along with Buckshot, Smif-N-Wessun and O.G.C.

== Biography ==
Heltah Skeltah debuted on Smif-N-Wessun's album Dah Shinin' in 1995, appearing on the tracks "Wontime", "Cession at da Doghillee" and "Let's Git It On". Later in 1995, they grouped up with fellow Boot Camp members O.G.C. to form the Fab 5 (a nod to the Beatles), and released a surprise hit single, "Leflaur Leflah Eshkoshka". Out of the Fab 5 members, Rock and Sean Price received the most attention for their charisma and chemistry. The duo released their debut album Nocturnal in June 1996, which included "Leflah", as well as the singles "Operation Lock Down" and "Therapy". The album sold over 250,000 copies in the United States, and has become a classic because of its grimy, basement sound and strong lyrics. The duo released a group album with the Boot Camp in 1997, then followed in 1998 with their second effort Magnum Force. The album's lead single, "I Ain't Havin' That" (sampled from the A Tribe Called Quest track "Hot Sex", with the chorus sampling Redman's 1996 hit "Pick it Up"), became a Hot 100 hit. Despite the single's success, the album was criticized due to its lighter content. Price and Rock seemed disillusioned with their lack of sales, and split up. Rock began having problems with Duck Down Records, and split with the label, signing to DJ Lethal's Lethal Records. He planned to release an album titled Planet Rock, but the label folded and the album disappeared. Sean Price remained with the Camp for their second album The Chosen Few in 2002. Heltah Skeltah reunited in 2005, making appearances on Sean Price's solo album Monkey Barz and Smif-N-Wessun's Smif 'N' Wessun: Reloaded. The duo continued work with the Boot Camp for their third group effort The Last Stand, released in July 2006. In 2007, Heltah Skeltah had a track included on the Official Joints mixtape, a collection of previously unreleased songs by NYC rappers. Heltah Skeltah dropped their third album together titled D.I.R.T. (Da Incredible Rap Team) which was released on September 30, 2008. Sean Price died in his sleep on August 8, 2015. He was 43 years old.

== Discography ==
=== Studio albums ===
Year	Album	Billboard Chart	
Year	Album	U.S.	R&B/Hip-Hop
1996	Nocturnal	35	5
1998	Magnum Force	34	8
2008	D.I.R.T. (Da Incredible Rap Team)	122	35

=== Singles ===
- 1995: Leflaur Leflah Eshkoshka (featuring O.G.C.) / Blah (featuring O.G.C.)
- 1996: Operation Lock Down / Da Wiggy
- 1996: Therapy (featuring Vinia Mojica) / Place to Be
- 1998: I Ain't Havin That (featuring Starang Wondah) / Worldwide (Rock the World)
- 1998: Brownsville II Long Beach (featuring Tha Dogg Pound) / Gunz 'N Onez (Iz U Wit Me) (featuring Method Man)
- 2008: Everything Is Helthah Skeltah (featuring The Loudmouf Choir)
- 2008: Ruck n Roll
