= Opaque (rapper) =

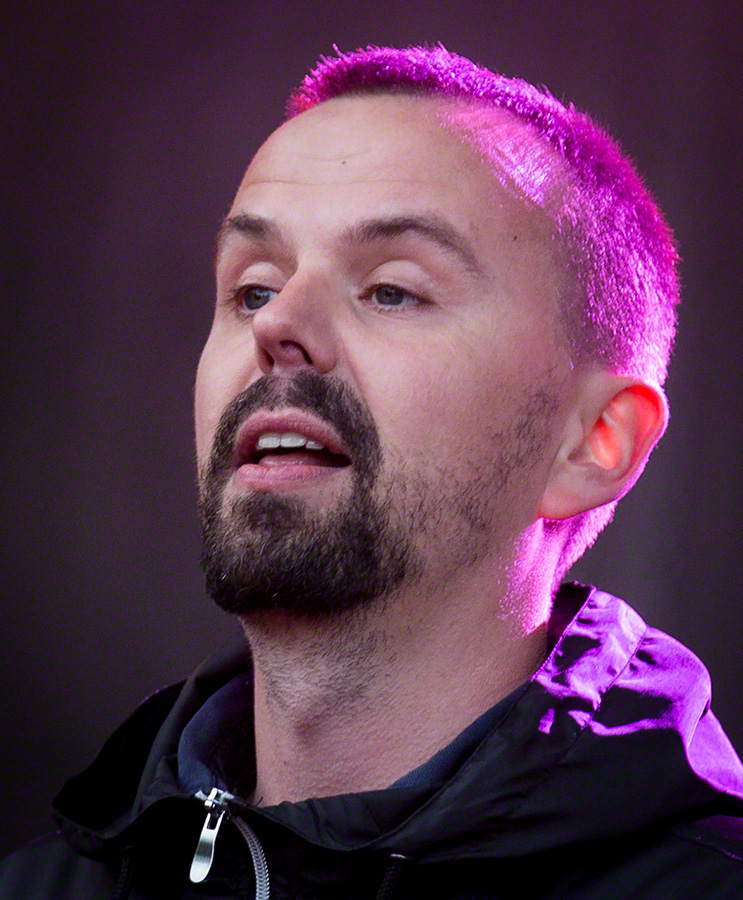

Background information
- Also known as: Mae
- Born: Morten Aasdahl Eliassen; 25 September 1976 (age 50)
- Genres: Rap, Hip Hop
- Occupations: Rapper, Songwriter
- Years active: 1997–present
- Label: Tee Productions

Morten Aasdahl Eliassen (born 25 September 1976), also known as stage name Opaque or the alias Mae, is a Norwegian rapper from Furuset in Oslo.

He is signed to Tommy Tee's record label Tee Productions, and released the album Gourmet Garbage in 2001.

In 2011 he appeared under the alias Mae (Morten Aasdahl Eliassen) on Jesse Jones debut album 12 blokker, 1 vei inn.

== History ==
Opaque was in the group Valuable Scamps which he established with Small MC, Kenny Bong and DJ Daniel Gude. After a few years the group disbanded, and he instead became associated with Tommy Tee's then newly established label Tee Productions. From 1997 to 2000, Opaque was a guest artist on releases from Warlocks, Tommy Tee, Helen Eriksen, N-Light-N (Now known as Son Of Light) and diaz. He also participated on Tee Productions compilation albums T.P. Allstars: Norske Byggeklosser and ScandalNavia Vol. 1.

Opaque & Kenny Bong have since been affiliated with The Loudmouf Choir, a distinctive group, which both Tommy Tee and the American rapper Sean Price are members of. The group is most noted for singing choruses on songs for artists like Smif-N-Wessun, Ken Ring, Krs-one and Buckshot. A single from their album Cameltoe named Skankboxx featuring Sean Price was released on 16 December 2011. On 13 April 2012 their debut album Cameltoe was released.

Opaque is primarily an English-language rapper, but on some releases he raps in his native language under the alias Mae, among others on ScandalNavia Vol. 1 and Jesse Jones debut album 12 blokker, 1 vei inn.

== Works ==
In 2001 he released his debut solo album, Gourmet Garbage. The album was well received by critics and fans, and was nominated for Spellemannprisen 2001, but still only sold 3000 copies. In the fall of 2011 Gourmet Garbage was ranked 23rd place in Morgenbladets poll of the best Norwegians albums ever. In 2018 he released his second solo album, Proletar Adel. 17 years after his first solo album.
