= André Eriksen =

Norwegian actor, rapper

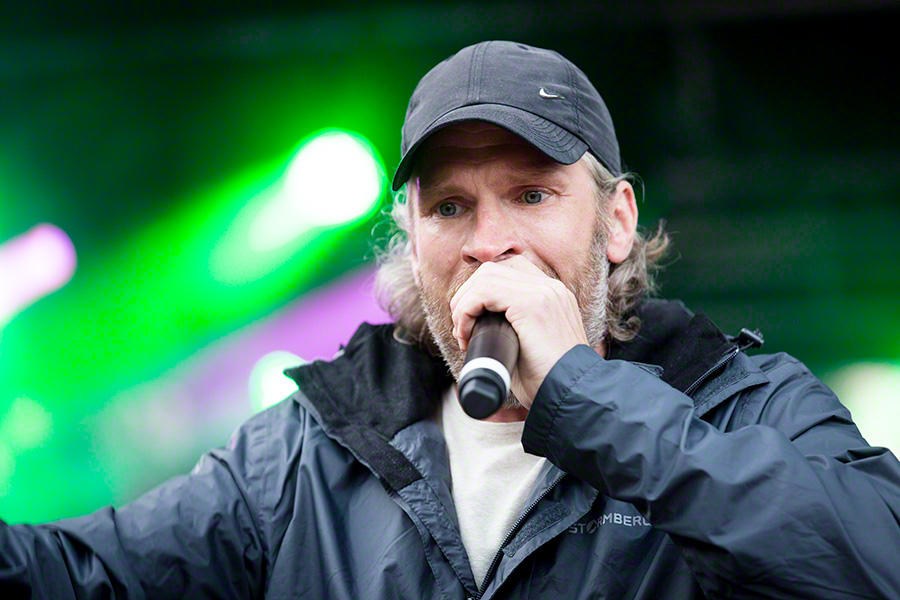
- Eriksen performing with T.P. Allstars and guests at Quart Festival in Kristiansand on 29 June 2016

Background information
- Born: 22 October 1975 (age 50)
- Occupations: Actor, rapper, graffiti artist
- Member of: Warlocks

André Eriksen (born 22 October 1975) is a Norwegian multi-platform artist with a career as an actor, rapper, and graffiti artist. He is best known as one of the lead vocalists in the Norwegian rap group Warlocks, which had commercial success in Scandinavia in the 1990s. He is considered a pioneer of Norwegian hip hop.

== Early life ==
Eriksen grew up in Stovner bydel, a low-income neighborhood in Oslo with a 53% immigrant population. He dropped out of school as a teenager and started making music and painting graffiti with friends in his neighborhood. Both his music and art were anti-establishment, and Eriksen was arrested several times for graffiti. In 1995 he was in police custody when his first album with the band Warlocks was released. The incident caught media attention and made Eriksen a public figure. Together with his brother Kevin Eriksen and friend Håkon Lund, they became spokesmen for the controversial Norwegian graffiti community. Eriksen won the Norwegian breakdance championships in 1997, both solo and with the crew Atomic B-Boys. Together with the rest of the members of Atomic B-Boys, Eriksen wrote, directed, and played in "Evolution of Style" at the Black Box Theatre, later picked up by the Norwegian Riksteatret, Kiasma in Helsinki and Kulturhuset in Stockholm. This was the first of many theatre shows he did with Atomic B-Boys. Eriksen performed in several contemporary dance performances with the Swedish ensemble Moves Per Minute, and toured with the National Swedish Touring Theatre several times.

== Acting career ==
Eriksen debuted his acting career in the film Nokas (2010), directed by Erik Skjoldbjaerg, about a real bank robbery that happened in downtown Stavanger in 2004. Skjoldbjaerg then hired Eriksen to play Aksel Hennie’s brother in the film Pionér (2013). Since then, Eriksen has appeared in a variety of American and Scandinavian television shows and movies. He has played Norse god Odin in Vikings. In 2021, he worked with Aksel Hennie and Noomi Rapace on The Trip, and in 2022, had a supporting part in Violent Night.

== Music career ==
Andre Eriksen (stage name "Tech Rock"), his brother Kevin Eriksen ("Karma"), and their friend Håkon Lund ("Hawk") formed the hip-hop trio Warlocks in 1992, releasing their debut album Lyrical Marksmen on a local independent label (dBut Records) in 1995.

Following the success of Lyrical Marksmen, they were picked up by Norway's leading rap label Tee Productions (owned by Tommy Tee), releasing three additional studio albums and a variety of singles in collaboration with Tee Productions over the next several years, including the widely popular song "Takin Ova" (feat N-Light-N, Diaz, Warlocks, Opaque, and Father Blanco) (1998). The album Afterlife, released in 2001, won the 2002 Norwegian Alarm Prize (category: hip hop / rap). Warlocks released their final album entitled The Never Ending Story in 2005 with C+C Records. Andre has toured Europe and Scandinavia numerous times with Warlocks and has shared stages with artists like the Beastie Boys, House of Pain, Wu-Tang Clan, 50 Cent and many more.

=== Break dance ===
André Eriksen was a member of the breakdance crew Atomic B-Boys, together with Lars "PayTwo" Undli and Bjørn "Sean" Hagen. The crew represented Norway in several international competitions and "jams" and held the title as Norwegian champions 1997–2000. Andre won the Scandinavian Battle Of The Year 2000 together with the group Nasty9 and represented the Nordic countries in the International Battle Of The Year 2000.

== Filmography ==
Title	Role	Year
Nokas	Thomas Tendrup	2010
Pionér	Knut	2013
Trio: Odins Gull	Tom	2014
Hotel Cæsar	Atle Søgård	2015
Hæsjtægg	Erik	2015
Julekongen – Full rustning	Lut	2015
Meglerne	Gerhard	2016
DC's Legends of Tomorrow	Baron Krieger/Captain Nazi	2016
Vikings	Odin	2016, 2017
Dragonheart: Battle for the Heartfire	Thorgrim	2017
The Navigator (short)	Freddy	2017
The Last Kingdom	Earl Ulf	2017
Mayhem	Colton "The Bull" Snyder	2017
Lethal Weapon	Zovra Umarov	2018
Black Lake (Svartsjøn)	Uno	2018
Norsemen (Vikingane)	Ørn	2017-2020
Slightly Dead	Daniel / Director	2020
The Trip	Roy	2021
Violent Night	Gingerbread	2022
Captain Fall	Hans	2023
Love Hurts	Otis	2025
Over Your Dead Body	Hollywood Todd	2026

== Discography ==
Album	Year
Lyrical Marksmen	1995
Top Notch	1997
Mic Knights	1998
Afterlife	2001
The Neverending Story	2005
