= Smiley (musician) =

- Also known as: Smiley Musiq
- Born: Tavis Nedd; December 18, 1980 (age 45)
- Origin: Aruba
- Genres: Reggae
- Occupation: Singer
- Years active: 2004–present
- Labels: Love and Unity Music
- Website: www.smileymusiq.com

Tavis Scoot (born December 18, 1980, in Aruba), better known as Smiley, is a reggae artist. He has been making music since he was seventeen years old. He moved to the Netherlands in 2000. For three years he toured with the popular Dutch reggae band, Out of Many.

== Early years ==
Smiley has performed at several festivals and venues in Europe and Aruba. He has also been the support act of reggae artist Ziggi Recado on his Dutch and German 'In Transit' tour.

In 2008 Smiley travelled to Jamaica to work with Barry ‘o Hare and Altafaan Records. Smiley also collaborated with Junior Kelly. The video of the track called "Dem a Wonder" has been aired by Reggae Entertainment Television, Tempo TV and TMF Pure. It also enjoyed rotation on the reggae radio station Irie FM in Jamaica.

On November 20, 2009, Smiley's song "Distance" was released on the Tek "a” Train riddim selection of the German reggae label Rootdown Records. The video reached the number 1 position in the Reggaefrance video charts. The video also aired on Tempo TV and TMF Pure.

== The Lively Road EP ==
The Lively Road EP was released in May 2010 and had a good reception by the reggae fans. The title song of the EP became a top ten charted song in the summer of 2010 in Curaçao and Bonaire. In the same year Smiley performed at the Reggaejam and Ruhr Reggae Summerfestival in Germany.

By the end of 2010, Smiley was featured on different riddim selections and collaborations. Smiley collaborated with Spanish rapper Abram (Rogando a Jah). Smiley has songs on three of the five best German riddims of 2010, voted by the readers of Riddim Magazine. "Kokoo Riddim" (Lively Road), "Everlasting Riddim" by Powpow Movement (Bad Minds) and the "Youth Riddim" (State of Emergency).

The single "State of Emergency" was released on the same day as the single "Keep the Joy" featuring Anthony B. Both songs were featured on the Riddim Magazine mix–cd in February 2011. The song "Keep the Joy" was also featured on the comic Dread & Alive Lost Tapes mixtape vol 6 in May 2011.

== Current activities ==
At the end of 2011, Smiley collaborated on a track with former Aftermath-artist Bishop Lamont, called "Golddiggy".

Smiley's latest song and video "What's New" was released on the Driver riddim selection by Lockdown Productions (Tippa Irie).

== Discography ==
Year	Artist	Singles	Album
February 2006	Smiley	"Tomorrow"	
2006	Smiley ft Ondrofeni	"Wailing Home"	
September 2007	Smiley	"Take it Easy"	Mixtape
2007	Smiley ft Kalibwoy	"Ancient War"	
September 2008	Smiley	"Wailing Home"	I believe in Amsterdam (compilation-album )
November 2008	Smiley ft Junior Kelly	"Dem a Wonder"	
February 2009	Smiley		Self titled mixtape
March 2009	Smiley	"Dem a Wonder"	download-single
May 2009	Smiley	"Mama"	download-single
August 2009	Smiley	"Dem a Wonder"	7
October 2009	Smiley	"Dem a Wonder"	Roots Rockers compilation album
October 2009	Smiley	"There's Nothing They Can Do"	Thriller G riddimselection (SX)
November 2009	Smiley	"Distance"	Train riddimselection + 7
May 2010	Smiley	Lively Road EP	
July 2010	Smiley	"Lively Road"	Lively Road EP
November 2010	Smiley ft Spanish rapper Abram	"Rogando the Jah"	
December 2010	Smiley	"Bad Mind"	Powpow "Everlasting" riddem selection (GE)
February 2011	Smiley ft Anthony B	"Keep the Joy"	
February 2011	Smiley	"State of Emergency"	Youth Riddim selection (GE)
May 2011	Smiley ft Anthony B	"Keep the Joy"	Lost Tapes v6/ Dread& Alive
September 2011	Smiley	"Big Money Bag"	Sensimillionaire riddim selection (AT)
September 2011	Smiley	"State of Emergency" / "Keep the Joy"	Reggae 4 Africa
October 2011	Smiley	"Rudebwoy"	Rootboy Riddim selection
November 2011	Smiley ft Bishop Lamont	"Golddiggy"	
January 2012	Smiley ft Blaxtar	"Big Money Bag" remix	
January 2012	Smiley	"What's New"	Driver Riddim selection (UK)

== Music videos ==
Year	Artist	Title	Chart position
2006	Smiley	"Tomorrow"	number 3 position in The Box reggae charts
2008	Smiley ft Junior Kelly	"Dem a Wonder"	
2010	Smiley	"Distance"	number 1 position in Reggaefrance.com videocharts + 12 weeks high rotation TMF Pure
2012	Smiley	"What's new"	

== Chart position ==
Year	Title	Chart position
2009	"Dem a Wonder"	Suriname highest position 3
2010	"Lively Road"	Dolfijn FM radio Curaçao / Bonaire highest position 6 in the top 40
