= Smif-n-Wessun: The Album =

Smif-N-Wessun: The Album

Studio album by Smif-N-Wessun
- Released: October 23, 2007
- Recorded: 2007
- Genre: Hip hop
- Length: 49:41
- Label: Duck Down
- Producer: General Steele (exec.); Ken Ring (also exec.); Collen and Webb; Rune Rotter; Soul Theory; Tommy Tee

Smif-N-Wessun chronology
Smif 'n' Wessun: Reloaded (2005)	Smif-N-Wessun: The Album (2007)	Monumental (2011)

Professional ratings
Review scores
Source	Rating
HipHopDX	3/5
XXL	L

Smif-N-Wessun: The Album is the fourth studio album by American hip hop duo Smif-N-Wessun. It was released on October 23, 2007, through Duck Down Music. Production was handled primarily by Swedish rapper and producer Ken Ring and Norwegian producer Tommy Tee, along with Rune Rotter, Soul Theory and Collen & Webb. It features guest appearances from the Loudmouf Choir, Chukki Star, Joell Ortiz, Million Stylez and Rock.

== Track listing ==
No.	Title	Producer(s)	Length
1.	"See the Light"	Ken Ring; Collen & Webb	3:56
2.	"Gotta Say It" (featuring Chukki Star)	Ken Ring; Collen & Webb	3:14
3.	"Trouble"	Ken Ring; Collen & Webb	3:40
4.	"K.I.M. 2000" (featuring the Loudmouf Choir)	Ken Ring	2:52
5.	"P.N.C. 4 Life"	Rune Rotter; Ken Ring	4:06
6.	"Gangsta Prayer" (featuring Million Stylez)	Rune Rotter; Ken Ring	3:50
7.	"Stomp Thru" (featuring Joell Ortiz and Rock)	Ken Ring; Collen & Webb	3:16
8.	"Who Gonna Save Us"	Tommy Tee; Ken Ring	3:48
9.	"Still Fighting"	Ken Ring; Collen & Webb	3:06
10.	"Yeah"	Tommy Tee; Ken Ring	3:54
11.	"Move"	Tommy Tee; Ken Ring	3:57
12.	"Cant Stop"	Soul Theory; Ken Ring	3:52
13.	"Can't Feel My Face" (featuring the Loudmouf Choir)	Tommy Tee; Ken Ring	3:15
14.	"Still Here"	Ken Ring; Collen & Webb	2:55
Total length:			49:41

== Personnel ==
- Darrell "Steele" Yates Jr. – main artist, executive producer
- Tekomin "Tek" Williams – main artist
- Anthony "Chukki Star" Williams – featured artist (track 2)
- The Loudmouf Choir – featured artists (tracks: 4, 13)
- Kenshin "Million Stylez" Iryo – featured artist (track 6)
- Joell Ortiz – featured artist (track 7)
- Jahmal "Rock" Bush – featured artist (track 7)
- Ken Ring Kiprono – producer, executive producer, recording, mixing, arranger
- Patric Collen – producer (tracks: 1–3, 7, 9, 14), recording, mixing, arranger
- Peter Webb – producer (tracks: 1–3, 7, 9, 14), recording, mixing, arranger
- Tommy Flåten – producer (tracks: 8, 10, 11, 13), recording, mixing, arranger
- Dan Humiston – recording, mixing, arranger
- Michael Sarsfield – mastering
- Kenyatta "Buckshot" Blake – associate executive producer
- Drew "Dru-Ha" Friedman – associate executive producer
- Skrilla Design – art direction, design
- Fubz – photography
- Sven "Svengali" Debacki – additional artwork
