= Born and Raised (EP) =

EP by Smif-N-Wessun
- Released: December 3, 2013
- Genre: Hip hop; reggae
- Length: 22:12
- Label: Duck Down
- Producer: Buckshot (exec.); Drew "Dru-Ha" Friedman (exec.); General Steele (exec.); Tek (exec.); Beatnick (also exec.); K-Salaam (also exec.)

Smif-N-Wessun chronology
Monumental (2011)	Born and Raised (2013)	The All (2019)

Singles from Born and Raised
- 1. "Sound Ground" Released: October 10, 2013

Born and Raised is the first extended play by American hip hop duo Smif-N-Wessun. It was released on December 3, 2013, through Duck Down Music. Entirely produced by Beatnick & K-Salaam, the six-song EP is a blend between reggae and hip hop music, and includes guest appearances from Jahdan Blakkamoore, Junior Kelly and Junior Reid. The EP was preceded by one single — "Solid Ground" featuring dancehall icon Junior Reid.

== Critical reception ==
Professional ratings
Review scores
Source	Rating
HipHopDX	3/5

Homer Johnsen of HipHopDX gave the album a three out of five, saying "Fans of Smif-N-Wessun will likely be pleased with Born and Raised. It is a notable change from their last effort, Monumental with Pete Rock, which speaks to their versatility as artists. The reggae flavor is also reminiscent of their raggamuffin-rap days as Cocoa Brovaz. In all, Born and Raised is an amalgamation of reggae and hip hop that displays Tek and Steele's ability to think inside and outside the box simultaneously".

== Track listing ==
Standard edition
No.	Title	Writer(s)	Length
1.	"Born and Raised" (featuring Jr. Kelly)	Tekomin Williams; Darrell Yates Jr.; Keith Morgan; Kayvon Sarfehjooy; Nick Phillips	3:39
2.	"Shots in the Dark" (featuring Jahdan Blakkamoore)	Williams; Yates Jr.; Wayne Henry; Sarfehjooy; Phillips	2:57
3.	"Solid Ground" (featuring Junior Reid)	Williams; Yates Jr.; Delroy Reid; Sarfehjooy; Phillips	3:48
4.	"These Streets"	Williams; Yates Jr.; Sarfehjooy; Phillips	3:57
5.	"Kamikaze" (featuring Jahdan Blakkamoore)	Williams; Yates Jr.; Henry; Sarfehjooy; Phillips	3:58
6.	"Rich Gyal" (featuring Jahdan Blakkamoore)	Williams; Yates Jr.; Henry; Sarfehjooy; Phillips	3:53
Total length:			22:12

iTunes deluxe edition
No.	Title	Length
7.	"Sound Bwoy Bureill (Live)" (featuring Judah Tribe Reggae Band and Jahdan Blakkamoore)	5:19
8.	"All Massive"	3:21
9.	"Solid Ground" (Instrumental)	3:48
10.	"Born and Raised" (Instrumental)	3:38
Total length:		38:18

Notes

- Track 4 features singling vocals by Velvet A. Ross and chatting vocals by DJ Full Front

== Personnel ==
- Tekomin "Tek" Williams – main artist, executive producer
- Darrell "Steele" Yates, Jr. – main artist, executive producer
- Keith "Junior Kelly" Morgan – featured artist (track 1)
- Wayne "Jahdan Blakkamoore" Henry – featured artist (tracks: 2, 5, 6)
- Delroy "Junior" Reid – featured artist (track 3)
- Velvet A. Ross – additional vocals (track 4)
- DJ Full Front – additional vocals (track 4)
- Kayvon "K-Salaam" Sarfehjooy – engineering, mixing, mastering, producer, executive producer
- Nick "Beatnick" Phillips – engineering, mixing, mastering, producer, executive producer
- Kenyatta "Buckshot" Blake – executive producer
- Drew "Dru-Ha" Friedman – executive producer
- Noah "NoHa" Friedman – project coordinator
