= Emmanuel Anebsa =

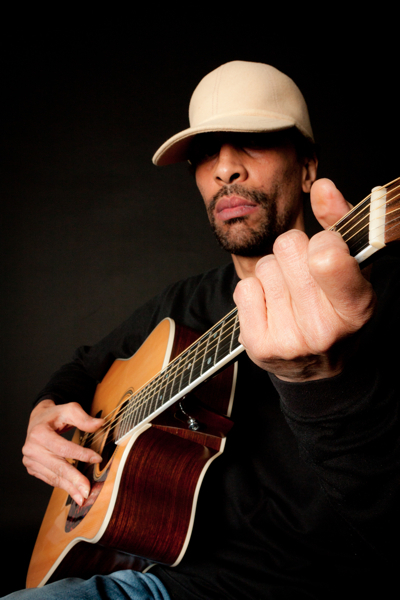

Background information
- Born: Steven Emmanuel Wilks; 27 November 1972 (age 53)
- Origin: Bristol, United Kingdom and Jamaica
- Genres: Reggae
- Years active: 1999-present
- Label: Wontstop Record
- Website: http://emmanuelanebsa.com

Emmanuel Anebsa (born 27 November 1972) is a singer, songwriter and producer from the United Kingdom. He has recorded over 30 albums, all independently produced.

== Early life ==
Anebsa, born Steven Emmanuel Wilks, grew up in St Pauls in Bristol in the 1970s and 1980s. He was the child of a Jamaican father, Bertram Wilks, and an English mother. He was raised by his father, Bertram, who was the owner of the Black and White Café in Bristol, which was his introduction to reggae music. Reggae stars such as U-Roy, Big Youth and Prince Fari passed through the café, and Anebsa grew up listening to artists such as Papa Toyan, Eek-A-Mouse and Peter Metro as well as Yellow Man, Dennis Brown and Gregory Issacs. He was nine years old when he came home from school to find the café being raided. After frequent police raids, the café finally closed for good in 2004.

== Musical career ==
As well as recording over 30 albums, Anebsa has produced and collaborated on songs with artists such as Junior Kelly. Earl "Chinna" Smith and Anthony B.

== Personal life ==
=== Activism ===
Anebsa was born Steven Emmanuel Wilks, but changed his name to Negus Emmanuel Anebsa to "release himself from Babylon bondage" and has used the name Emmanuel Anebsa professionally ever since. He rejects his British background and considers himself Jamaican. He considers his music a form of activism, designed to combat the "stinging crush of white oppression". He traces his what he terms his "afro-consciousness" back to witnessing the police raids on his father's café, which he believes were racially motivated.

== Discography ==
=== Albums ===
- U Gotta Believe (2000)
- It's a Shame (2001)
- Smiling (2005)
- Tears (2005)
- Brightest Night (2006)
- He loves You (2008)
- You Are The Sunshine (2008)
- Blow myself Away (2008)
- Build a Sofa (2008)
- You Can't Save Me (2008)
- To Be Humble (2008)
- Brother Faith (2009)
- With You (2009)
- Pressure Like Me (2009)
- Voix ala Guitare (2010)
- Love Them (2010)
- Mr Nobody (2010)
- Vibes (2011)
- Making Me Sick (2011)
- Shoeshine Boy (2011)
- Won't go Away (2012)
- We Got Problems (2012)
- You cause Pain (2013)
- Fighting (2016)
- Revolution (2016)
- Ghetto Beats (2016)

=== Singles & EPs ===
- Why Do I Feel This Way - EP (1999)
- Doniki - Fly to Zion - 7" (2005)
- Friends Now - EP (2008)
- Iona (2016)
- One Woman Man (2017)
- Black People (2017)
- We Wear It Well (Unknown)
