= Aggi Crew =

Criminal drug gang in Bristol

The Aggi Crew were a criminal drug gang based in the St Paul's district of Bristol. The name of the gang is an abbreviation of aggravated burglary ("doing an aggi") according to its former leader.

== History ==
The gang dominated the city's drug market throughout most of the 1990s, until in 1998 six gang members were jailed after being caught with more than a £1 million worth of crack cocaine. The power vacuum that this created was quickly filled by Yardie gangs such as the Hype Crew and Mountain View Posse. Upon their release from prison the Aggi crew quickly set on reclaiming their old territory. Carrying guns and wearing balaclavas, the gangsters went around local bars such as the Black Swan and the Malcolm X Centre and announced the yardies would now have to pay a daily tax of £50 per yardie and £100 per business being run. The yardies did not agree with this however and stormed a cafe run by the Aggis, which doubled as a front for an illegal gambling operation. Thus was started a small-scale turf war which included a number of shootings, during the course of which the two Aggi crew members robbed the notorious Black and White Café, a known local drugs haunt, and later shot fireworks at the building in an attempt to provoke the yardies into a full-on gunfight. The escalating violence prompted armed police patrols in the St Paul's area. However the patrols were soon withdrawn, as the Aggi crew members were arrested again for violating their parole and the turf war ended.
