= Z LaLa =

American rapper

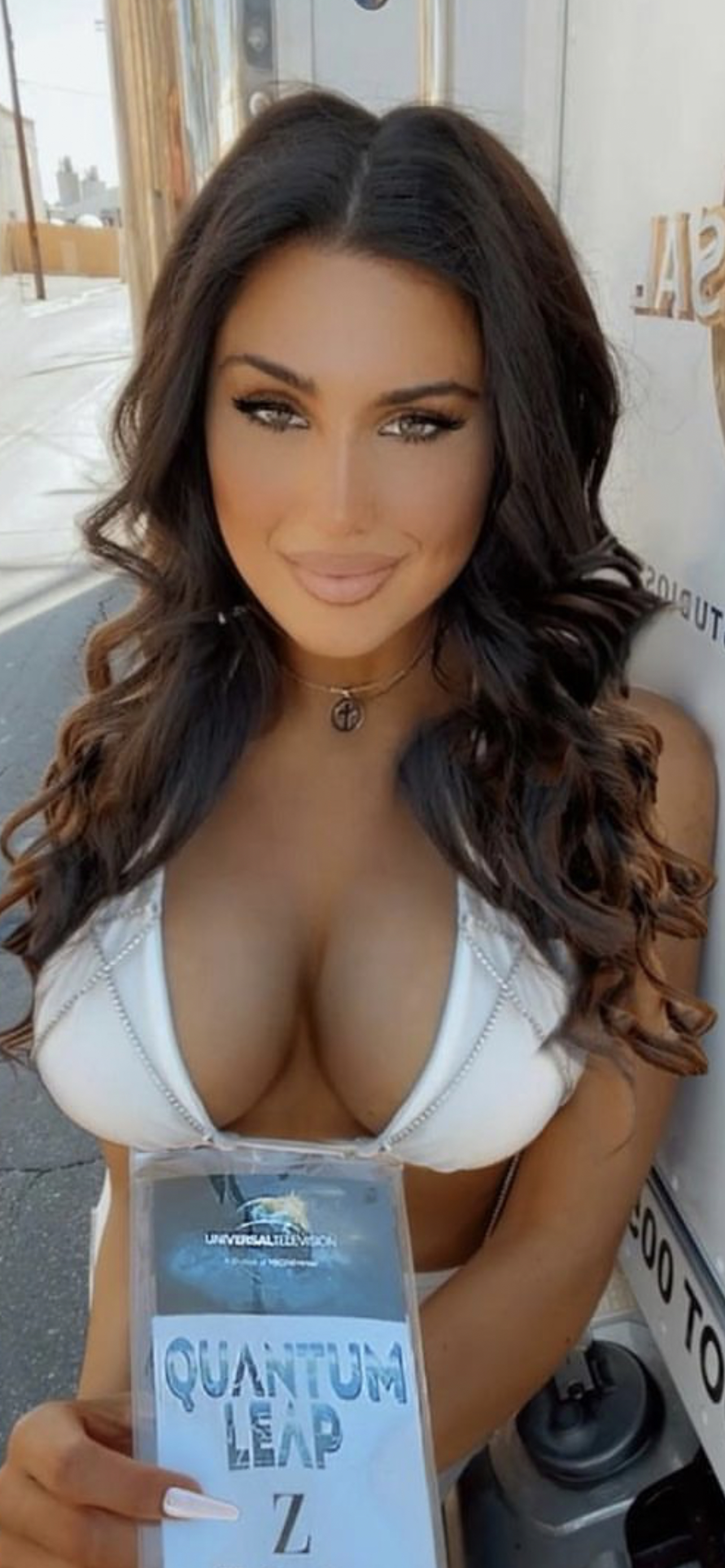
- Z LaLa in 2023

Background information
- Born: Tania Muradian; July 6, 1989 (age 37); Los Angeles, California
- Genres: Reggae, Dancehall, World Pop
- Occupations: Singer, songwriter, rapper, entrepreneur, humanitarian
- Years active: 2011–present
- Label: Omega Alpha Records
- Website: Official website

Z LaLa (born Tania Muradian; July 6, 1992) is an American singer, songwriter, rapper, entrepreneur, and humanitarian. She sings in 21 languages, including American Sign Language.

== Early life and education ==
Z LaLa was born and raised in Los Angeles, California, in a family of opera singers and theatrical performers. When she was 12 years old, Z LaLa began performing at school functions and local competitions. By the age of 14, she was competing internationally whilst doing performances at humanitarian events. At the age of 14, Z LaLa won as best singer for Lil Wayne's "Making the next Hit." She turned down the opportunity to go to Atlanta to film the reality show.

== Career ==
Z LaLa's debut electro-pop album, Zilosophy, was released in October 2011. The second single released by Z LaLa was "Sweet Dreams (Are Made of This)," a cover of the 1980s hit by the Eurythmics. Her single "Strangers in the Night" peaked at #10 on the Billboard dance chart.

Z LaLa is best known for pushing the boundaries in the mainstream market through the imagery that she projects in her music videos and on the red carpets, thus making her one of the most controversial pop artist celebrities of her time. Singing in a total of 21 languages, Z LaLa released her first single "Flyaway," in 14 different languages, including Spanish, French, Hebrew, Korean, Russian, German, Armenian, two Arabic dialects, Persian, English, Urdu, Italian and American Sign Language. In 2015, Z LaLa released the single Navigation Nightclub in 17 languages, including Armenian, English, Hindi, Mandarin, Arabic, German, Tagalog, Indonesian, Japanese, Russian, Korean, Persian, Spanish, French, Portuguese, Hebrew and sign language.

Z LaLa is well known for her eccentric outfits that bear resemblance to the style of Lady Gaga. Her appearance at the 2013 Billboard Music Awards received attention from publications such as Billboard, E! News, Business Insider, Yahoo!, and various others that featured Z Lala's outfit on 'best' and 'most outrageous' dressed lists. Z LaLa's appearance at the 14th annual Latin Grammy Awards was covered by The Washington Post and Latina Magazine.

Z LaLa has partnered with Hayari Paris and several companies for product endorsements. She has been a brand ambassador for Manic Panic, Fashion Nova, Akira, Shake it Baby, and Flat Tummy Co. She launched a 3-year limited time fashion line called "Z-Thru".

In 2023, she released the song "Warriors" with Jamaican artist Anthony B, which was described as a "mesmerizing fusion of reggae rhythms interwined with hip-hop nuances".

== Discography ==
Title	Release date	Album
"Flyaway"	2011	Zilosophy
"Sweet Dreams (Are Made of This)"	2013	Single
"Blue Monday"	2014	Single
2015	Single	
"Strangers in the Night"	2017	Single
"Warriors" (with Anthony B)		

Zilosophy (released October 2011)

- Abricadabra
- Sexual Sandy
- Sweet Dreams
- Alien Lover
- Hit 'Um Back
- Bang Bang, I Shot My Baby Down
- Hush, Be Quiet, Cocky
- Flyaway
- War in My Head
- Z LaLa (Je 'Taime)

=== Singles ===
- Navigation Nightclub (English)
- Navigation Nightclub (Spanish)
- Navigation Nightclub (Armenian)
- Navigation Nightclub (Arabic)
- Navigation Nightclub (Indonesian)
- Navigation Nightclub (Japanese)
- Navigation Nightclub (Hindi)
- Navigation Nightclub (Korean)
- Navigation Nightclub (Sign)
- Navigation Nightcllub (Tagalog)
- Navigation Nightclub (Portuguese)
- Navigation Nightclub (Mandarin)
- Sexual Sandy Remix
- Sweet Dreams (Are made of This)
- Do That feat. Demolition
- My Money (Ha Ha) feat. Stevey Fre$h
- Flyaway (English)
- Flyaway (Armenian)
- Flyaway (Levantine Arabic)
- Flyaway (Iraqui Arabic)
- Flyaway (Spanish)
- Flyaway (French)
- Flyaway (Urdu)
- Flyaway (Persian)
- Flyaway (Ukrainian)
- Flyaway (Hebrew)
- Flyaway (Korean)
- Flyaway (Italian)
- Flyaway (Sign Language)
- Flyaway (German)
