= Wontstop Record =

English record label

- Founded: 1998
- Founder: Emmanuel Anebsa
- Status: Active
- Genre: Folk, Acoustic, Reggae
- Country of origin: United Kingdom
- Location: Bristol
- Official website: Official website

Wontstop Record is an independent record label founded in 1998 by Emmanuel Anebsa in Bristol, United Kingdom. The label has produced and released 37 albums and 30 singles, including singles such as Junior Kelly's "Jah Know", Anthony B's "Make My Money" and Anebsa's "Change My Life". In 2016, the label released a compilation album featuring the work of Anebsa, Doniki, Junior Kelly, Determine, Jah Mason and Turbulance.

According to a report in The Gleaner, the label has "built a reputation for hard-hitting dub and roots reggae music that elevates black consciousness".

== Selected discography ==
Albums

- Emmanuel Anebsa – To Be Humble
- Emmanuel Anebsa – Smiling
- Emmanuel Anebsa – We Got Problems
- Emmanuel Anebsa – Ghetto Beats
- Emmanuel Anebsa – Conscious Voices
- Emmanuel Anebsa – St. Paul's Ghetto
- Emmanuel Anebsa – Action Now
- Emmanuel Anebsa – If You
- Emmanuel Anebsa – Mr. Nobody

Singles

- Junior Kelly – "Jah Know"
- Anthony B – "Make My Money"
- Emmanuel Anebsa ft. Turbulance – "We Wear It Well"
- Emmanuel Anebsa ft. Doniki – “Fly to Zion"
- Emmanuel Anebsa ft. Jah Mason – "Have Fi Pray"

== See also ==
- Black and White Café
