= Diaz (musician) =

Norwegian rapper (born 1976)

Diaz (full name Andres Rafael Diaz) is a rapper from Jessheim, Norway, born 26 July 1976. His father, Andres Rafael Diaz Rosa, is Spanish, and his mother, Inger, is Norwegian.

He has released three solo albums: 2050, Velkommen Hjem, Andres (Welcome Home, Andres), and Jessheimfanden. All paying homage to his hometown of Jessheim, which lies some 40 km N/NE of Norway's capital, Oslo, close to the city's airport, Gardermoen. 2050 is the postal code for Jessheim. Velkommen Hjem, Andres refers to the Norwegian film Velkommen Hjem, Anders, which was filmed in 1985 in Jessheim with a cast of local actors.

In addition to this, he has collaborated on numerous singles and albums by artists like Warlocks, Opaque, Tommy Tee, Wu-Tang Clan's RZA, and kapasiteettiyksikkö

The album Velkommen Hjem Andres includes the song "Mitt Terningkast," which Diaz's childhood friends Shagrath and Galder of the symphonic black metal band Dimmu Borgir made in collaboration with. The song "Hats Off to Aruto", a tribute to another childhood friend, was briefly popular in the United States.

Diaz started working as a DJ when he was 13 and has worked as a presenter on Norwegian Channel 24. He also used to run a record shop in Oslo, T&D Records, with mentor and producer Tommy Tee. Tommy Tee has produced much of Diaz's work and runs Tee Productions, the record label that publishes albums by Diaz, Warlocks, Gatas Parlament, and others. He also used to work as a label manager for BMG Music (Norway) and as a promoter for Universal Music (Norway). By 2003, he was one of Norway's foremost hip-hop artists.

Diaz retired from rap music, although he made a comeback appearance in October 2009. He studied business at the Norwegian School of Management. He has worked with the Salvation Army, and for the past three years, he has worked for the Norwegian Red Cross (Oslo Red Cross) with inner-city youth.
