= Smif 'n' Wessun: Reloaded =

Smif 'N' Wessun: Reloaded

Studio album by Tek & Steele
- Released: September 13, 2005
- Recorded: 2002–05
- Genre: Hip hop
- Length: 53:57
- Label: Duck Down
- Producer: Buckshot (exec.); Drew "Dru-Ha" Friedman (exec.); Coptic; Da Beatminerz; Dru Kevorkian; Ken Ring; Khrysis; MoSS; Roc Raida; Rune Rotter

Tek & Steele chronology
The Rude Awakening (1998)	Smif 'N' Wessun: Reloaded (2005)	Smif-n-Wessun: The Album (2007)

Professional ratings
Review scores
Source	Rating
IGN	7/10
RapReviews	8/10

Smif 'n' Wessun: Reloaded is the third studio album by American hip hop duo Smif-N-Wessun, and the only one released under the name Tek & Steele (formerly known as Cocoa Brovaz due to a lawsuit with the Smith & Wesson firearms company in 1995). It was released on September 13, 2005, via Duck Down Music as a part of the label's "Triple Threat Campaign", preceded by Sean Price's Monkey Barz and Buckshot's Chemistry. Production was handled by Da Beatminerz, Coptic, Ken Ring, Khrysis, Rune Rotter, MoSS, Roc Raida and Dru Kevorkian. It features guest appearances from the Boot Camp Clik, Dead Prez, Talib Kweli and Tony Touch. The album peaked at number 69 on the Billboard Top R&B/Hip-Hop Albums chart in the US.

== Track listing ==
No.	Title	Writer(s)	Producer(s)	Length
1.	"Reloaded"	Darrell A. Yates, Jr.; Tekomin B. Williams; Dru Kevorkian	Dru Kevorkian	2:54
2.	"The Truth"	Yates, Jr.; T. Williams; Anthony Williams	Roc Raida	2:04
3.	"My Timbz Do Work" (featuring Heltah Skeltah)	Yates, Jr.; T. Williams; Jahmal Bush; Sean Price; Ken Ring; Rune Rotter	Ken Ring; Rune Rotter	3:59
4.	"Gunn Rap"	Yates, Jr.; T. Williams; Christopher Tyson	Khrysis	3:18
5.	"Toolz of the Trade"	Yates, Jr.; T. Williams; Ewart C. Dewgarde	Da Beatminerz	3:50
6.	"Sick Em Son"	Yates, Jr.; T. Williams; Tyson	Khrysis	3:28
7.	"War"	Yates, Jr.; T. Williams; King; Rotter; Eric Matlock	Ken Ring; Rune Rotter; Coptic^{[a]}	3:06
8.	"Warriorz Heart (Gangbang)" (featuring Dead Prez)	Yates, Jr.; T. Williams; Lavonne Alford; Clayton Gavin; Matlock	Coptic	3:33
9.	"Here I Stand (The Streets Been Good to Me)"	Yates, Jr.; T. Williams; Matlock	Coptic; Lizette Wilson	4:53
10.	"City of Godz (Ciudad de Dios)" (featuring Buckshot)	Yates, Jr.; T. Williams; Kenyatta Blake; Matlock	Coptic	2:58
11.	"U Undastand Me?" (featuring Starang Wondah and Tony Touch)	Yates, Jr.; T. Williams; Jack McNair; Joseph Hernandez; Dewgarde	Da Beatminerz	4:03
12.	"Get Back" (featuring Boot Camp Clik)	Yates, Jr.; T. Williams; Barret Powell; Blake; Price; Jason Connoy	MoSS	4:25
13.	"A Hustlers Prayer"	Yates, Jr.; T. Williams; Dewgarde	Da Beatminerz	3:07
14.	"PNC Boyz"	Yates, Jr.; T. Williams; Matlock	Coptic	3:34
15.	"We Came Up (Crystal Stair)" (featuring Talib Kweli)	Yates, Jr.; T. Williams; Talib Kweli Greene; Dewgarde	Da Beatminerz	4:45
Total length:				53:57

Notes

- ^{^[a]} signifies an additional producer

== Personnel ==
- C/4 – engineering, mixing
- Christopher "Cesar Comanche" Robinson – engineering, mixing
- Christopher "Khrysis" Tyson – engineering, mixing
- Dan "The Man" Humiston – engineering, mixing
- DJ Mello – engineering, mixing
- Dru Kevorkian – engineering, mixing
- Eric "Coptic" Matlock – Producer
- Kamel – engineering, mixing
- Kieran Walsh – engineering, mixing
- Rob "Giambi" Garcia – engineering, mixing
- Drew "Dru-Ha" Friedman – executive producer
- Kenyatta "Buckshot" Blake – executive producer
- Eckō Mindlabs – art direction
- Akash Khokha – additional art direction
- Romeo Tanghal – cover illustration
- Raphael Tanghal – cover illustration
- Noel Spirandelli – photography
- Noah "Noha" Friedman – marketing

== Album singles ==
- "Spit Again" (non-album single, from Soundbombing III)
  - Released: June 28, 2002
  - B-Side: "Toolz of the Trade"
- "Crystal Stair"
  - Released: April 29, 2005
  - B-Side: "Swollen Tank"
- "My Timbz Do Work"/"Gunn Rap"
  - Released: October 28, 2005
  - B-Side: "Reloaded", "Get Back"

== Charts ==
Chart (2005)	Peak position
US Top R&B/Hip-Hop Albums (Billboard)	69
