= Smif-N-Wessun =

American hip hop Duo

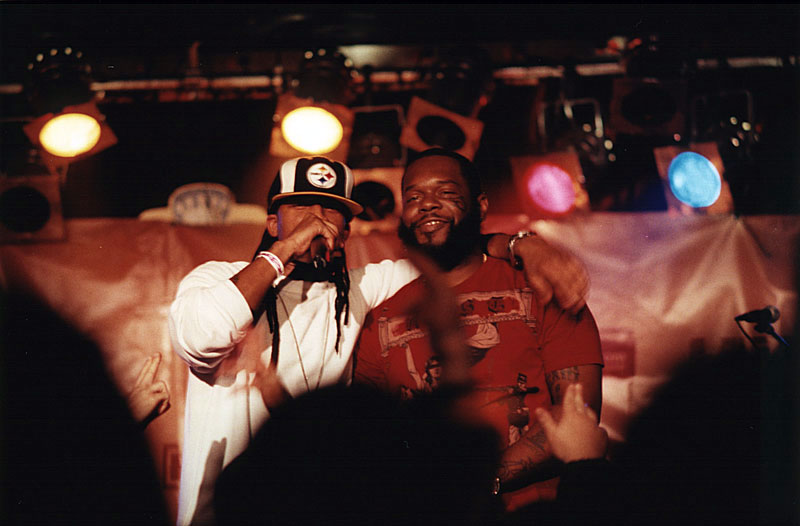
- Steele (left) and Tek in 2007

Background information
- Also known as: Cocoa Brovaz; Tek-N-Steele
- Origin: Brooklyn, New York City, U.S.
- Genres: Hip hop; hardcore hip hop
- Years active: 1993–present
- Labels: Nervous; Duck Down
- Spinoff of: Boot Camp Clik
- Members: Tek; Steele
- Website: smifnwessun.com

Smif-N-Wessun, also known as Cocoa Brovaz and Tek-N-Steele, is an American hip hop duo from Brooklyn, New York City. It is composed of rappers Tekomin "Tek" Williams (born June 3, 1973) from Bedford–Stuyvesant and Darrell "Steele" Yates (born December 18, 1972) from Brownsville. The duo comprise one quarter of supergroup Boot Camp Clik, together with Buckshot, Heltah Skeltah and Originoo Gunn Clappaz. Both members are known for their Jamaican Patois during their raps, which was more evident during the earlier stages of their career.

== History ==
The duo debuted on Black Moon's 1993 album Enta da Stage on the tracks "Blac Smif-N-Wessun" and "U Da Man". They released their first single "Bucktown" b/w "Let's Git It On" in early 1994, which became an underground hit. Released in January 1995, their album Dah Shinin' peaked at number 59 on the Billboard 200 and number 5 on the Top R&B/Hip-Hop Albums chart, and went on to sell over 300,000 copies in the United States. Along with "Bucktown", the album featured the singles "Wrekonize" b/w "Sound Bwoy Bureill" and "Wontime" b/w "Stand Strong". Dah Shinin became an influential album in the hardcore hip hop scene of the mid-1990s. Soon after the release of their debut, Smif-N-Wessun received a cease and desist order over their group name by the Smith & Wesson firearms company. To avoid the lawsuit, they changed their name to Cocoa Brovaz in 1996.

In 1997, Cocoa Brovaz joined up with the Buckshot, Heltah Skeltah and Originoo Gunn Clappaz for Boot Camp Clik debut collaborative effort For the People. In early 1998, the duo dropped their second album The Rude Awakening. The release was met with mixed reviews and moderate sales. The album's lead single, the Raekwon-assisted "Black Trump", was not able to reach any Billboard charts. In 1999, the Clik was dropped from Priority Records, leaving the duo temporarily unsigned. Soon after, the Cocoa Brovaz released an underground single "Super Brooklyn", which sampled the Super Mario Bros. theme. Because of the illegal use of the sample, the duo was not able to officially release the track, but the single landed them a deal with underground label Rawkus Records.

They appeared on a number of compilation albums over the next few years, including Soundbombing II, Lyricist Lounge 2, Domingo's Game Over, Soundbombing III, and Frankie Cutlass's Politics & Bullshit. They were never able to release the album they recorded for Rawkus Records in 2002, though it has circulated as a bootleg. They rejoined Duck Down Music for the release of the Boot Camp Clik's second group album The Chosen Few in the same year. In September 2005, they returned as Smif-N-Wessun for the album Smif 'n' Wessun: Reloaded. The album received good reviews, and sold around 35,000-40,000 copies in the United States. In 2006, the Boot Camp Clik released their third group album, The Last Stand, to strong reviews and Smif-N-Wessun appeared on a special edition of Ich, the second album of the German rapper Sido. Smif-N-Wessun's fourth album, Smif-n-Wessun: The Album, was released on October 23, 2007. The album is produced by Ken Ring, Tommy Tee and more, and features appearances from Rock of Heltah Skeltah, Joell Ortiz and Norwegian supergroup the Loudmouf Choir.

In 2008, they participated as guests in one track on PIO Squad's album Interview. There were plans for a new Smif-n-Wessun album to be released in 2009. The duo has confirmed that legendary producer Pete Rock would be producing a majority, if not all of the album. The album is entitled Monumental and was released on June 28, 2011. The album's guests include Raekwon, Bun B, Styles P, Heltah Skeltah, Top Dogg, Buckshot from Boot Camp Clik, Memphis Bleek, Freeway, Black Rob and Hurricane G.

In September 2013, the duo announced the release of a reggae-inspired extended play entitled Born and Raised entirely produced by Beatnick & K-Salaam. The EP was released on December 3, 2013, and includes guest appearances from Junior Reid, Junior Kelly, Jahdan Blakkamoore and DJ Full Factor. The EP's release was supported by one single – "Solid Ground" featuring Junior Reid.

In September 2018, they performed on NPR's Tiny Desk Concerts.

In 2019, the group has released their sixth studio album The All, entirely produced by the Soul Council production team (9th Wonder, Khrysis, Eric Gabouer, Eric Jones, Nottz), followed-up by extended play Seasons with Belgian hip hop producer dFonk. They also participated in Black Moon's fourth studio album Rise of da Moon.

== Discography ==
=== Studio albums ===
- 1995: Dah Shinin'
- 1998: The Rude Awakening
- 2005: Smif 'n' Wessun: Reloaded
- 2007: Smif-n-Wessun: The Album
- 2011: Monumental (with Pete Rock)
- 2019: The All
- 2025: Infinity

=== EPs ===
- 2013: Born and Raised
- 2019: Seasons (EP) (with dFonK)

=== Charted singles ===
| Year | Song | Chart positions | | | Album |
| Year | Song | U.S. Hot 100 | U.S. R&B | U.S. Rap | Album |
|---|---|---|---|---|---|
| 1994 | "Bucktown" | 93 | 61 | 14 | Dah Shinin' |
| 1994 | "Let's Git It On" | – | – | 14 | Dah Shinin' |
| 1995 | "Wrekonize" | – | 95 | 29 | Dah Shinin' |
| 1995 | "Sound Bwoy Bureill" | – | – | 29 | Dah Shinin' |
| 1995 | "Wontime" | 116 | – | 48 | Dah Shinin' |
| 1997 | "Won on Won" | – | 94 | – | The Rude Awakening |
| 1998 | "Bucktown USA" | – | – | 47 | The Rude Awakening |
| 2001 | "Get Up" | – | 90 | 9 | Lyricist Lounge 2 |
