= Born and Raised =

Born and Raised may refer to:

- Born and Raised (Cormega album), 2009
- Born and Raised (John Mayer album), or the title song, 2012
- Born & Raised (Joy Denalane album), or the title song, 2006
- Born & Raised (EP), an EP by Smif-n-Wessun
- "Born and Raised", 2009 song from the Alexisonfire album, Old Crows / Young Cardinals
- "Born and Raised" (song), 2017 by the Hunter Brothers
- "Born & Raised" (Parks and Recreation), an episode of Parks and Recreation
