= Fred, Frihet & Alt Gratis =

Studio album by Gatas Parlament
- Released: August 2004
- Genre: Hip hop
- Label: Tee Productions
- Producer: Don Martin; Jester; Definite; Tommy Tee; Crazy Minister

Gatas Parlament chronology
Holdning Over Underholdning (2001)	Fred, Frihet & Alt Gratis (2004)

Fred, Frihet & Alt Gratis ("Peace, Freedom & Everything For Free") is an album released by the Norwegian hip hop group Gatas Parlament. It was released in August 2004.

The cover was made by Rolf Groven.

== Reception ==
From the Norwegian press, who mostly graded the album with dice throws (ranging from 1 to 6), the album received moderate reviews.

The dice throw of 5 was given by Adresseavisen as well as a few other newspapers and hip-hop reviewer Martin Bjørnersen in Natt og Dag.

A score of 4 was given by Dagbladet and Aftenposten (Aften edition) in Oslo, as well as several other outlets.

Verdens Gang, Dagsavisen Bergens Tidende and Bergensavisen were among the moderate-to-negative newspapers, where the reviewers gave 3 out of 6, as did others.

A negative review score of 2 was given by Stavanger Aftenblad, among others.

== Track listing ==
#	Track title	Producers
1	2004	
2	Staten & kapitalen	Tommy Tee (Tee Productions)
3	Manisk progressiv	Don Martin (Alarmclock Connection)
4	Skandalemakere	Don Martin (Alarmclock Connection)
5	Vi er faen meg best	Definite (Alarmclock Connection)
6	Et reint hælvete	Tommy Tee (Tee Productions)
7	Protester! (feat. Jon Michelet)	
8	Antiamerikansk dans (feat. Promoe)	Jester (Alarmclock Connection)
9	Spis de rike	Crazy Minister (Savage Army)
10	Rap! Rap! Rap!	
11	Kammerater	Don Martin (Alarmclock Connection)
12	Bibliotekar	Definite (Alarmclock Connection)
13	Bombefly	Don Martin (Alarmclock Connection)
14	Futurama	Jester (Alarmclock Connection)
15	Kosmonaut	Tommy Tee (Tee Productions)
