= K-Salaam =

American DJ (born 1977)

K-Salaam (born Kayvon Sarfehjooy in 1977 in Montreal, Quebec) is a Canadian-born American producer, turntablist, and educator. At age three, his family moved to Minneapolis, Minnesota where he was raised for most of his childhood. He then moved to New York City to pursue a career in music. He currently resides in Vancouver, BC. He is of Iranian heritage.

== Career ==
After releasing two critically acclaimed mixtapes The Hands of Time and Real DJs Do Real Things he joined Beatnick (born Nick Phillips in 1986) and his brother and silent partner Kaveh Sarfehjooy (born 1976) to form Beatnick & K-Salaam Productions. Beatnick & K-Salaam would handle the creative and music aspect of the partnership, while Kaveh was the mind behind the business. Their first album, The World Is Ours, was released on August 25, 2006 through their own label. The album was then re-released by VP Records / Universal as Whose World is This in 2008. Featured on this release were a number of prolific underground hip hop artists, such as: Mos Def, Dead Prez, Papoose, Saigon and Talib Kweli, and reggae artists such as Capleton, Sizzla, Luciano and Anthony B. The music fuses reggae and hip hop, and incorporates socially conscious themes.

Beatnick and K-Salaam went on to produce more albums as well as songs for internationally acclaimed artists such as: Keane, Trey Songz, K’naan, Talib Kweli, Lil Wayne, Bun B, Lowkey, Sizzla, Nas, Freddie Gibbs, Buju Banton, Junior Reid, Hollywood Undead, Collie Buddz, Tech N9ne, Femi Kuti and many more. The duo traveled to Brazil and produced Emicida’s entire album, Doozicabraba e a Revolução Silenciosa, released in 2011, resulting in Emicida receiving Brazil's MTV's 2011 Artist of the Year Award.

The duo also produced more songs with Emicida, as well as all of the songs on: Murs & Fashawn's album This Generation (2012), Rael's Ainda Bem Que Eu Segui as Batidas do Meu Coração, and Smif-n-Wessun’s Born and Raised (2013). Moreover, from 2011 - 2013, the duo did sound design for Lauryn Hill - Creating custom made synth sounds & samples for the keyboard player & Drummer for her live shows.

In 2016, the duo went on to score music for NBC’s coverage of the Olympic Games. Their music has been featured in multiple video games, TV shows, & commercials. In 2022, their music was featured prominently in the Video Game “Fortnite,” as part t of their Virtual Soundwave Series Concert was the #1 streaming Video Game at the time. The Virtual concert garnered so much attention that it was picked up by various major cinemas throughout Brazil, in which it aired for free for two weeks.

K-Salaam's production skills and expertise are sought after by music professionals throughout the world, in which he has taught at various Vice TV music production seminars in Brazil, & New York's Scratch Academy, as well as Berklee College of Music in Boston. He also taught at the Inst. of Audio Research for 4 years, before the school shut down, and he teaches his own customized course “The Virtual Producer” every Summer at NYU's

Clive Davis School of Recorded Music in New York City. K-Salaam also teaches and co-runs a Music Production & Audio Engineer Program (MTD) at Douglas College in Vancouver, BC.
