= Everton Williams =

Everton Williams may refer to:

- Everton Blender (born 1954), Jamaican award-winning reggae singer whose birth name was Everton Williams.
- Everton Williams (footballer) (born 1957), Jamaican former footballer who played in the English Football League for Wrexham.
