= 1980 St Pauls riot =

Riots in Bristol, England

Coordinates: 51.4645°N 2.5824°W

- Police facing rioters in City Road, St Pauls.
- Date: 2 April 1980; 46 years ago
- Location: Bristol, England
- Participants: Police, local residents
- Outcome: 25 injured, 130 arrested, no convictions

The St Pauls riot occurred in St Pauls, Bristol, England on 2 April 1980 when police raided the Black and White Café on Grosvenor Road in the heart of the area. After several hours of disturbance in which fire engines and police cars were damaged, 130 people were arrested, 25 were taken to hospital, including 19 police and members of the press.

The riot occurred against a background of increasing racial tension, poor housing and alienation of black youth. As a result of the disturbances local authorities and the national government began to pay attention to these issues. The Black and White Café was closed in 2004 and eventually demolished.

== Background ==
Bristol in the 1970s had seen an increase in unemployment and a deterioration of race relations as the right-wing National Front party campaigned in local and national elections. St Pauls was blighted by the development of the M32 motorway, which split the area from the neighbouring district of Easton. Much of the housing in the area was in a poor state and local education services failed to cater adequately for the needs of either ethnic minorities or indeed many working class white communities. St Pauls as a locality was around 35% non-White in 1981, much of this population Afro-Caribbean.

Increasing use by the police of Sus laws to stop and search youths, predominantly those from the Afro-Caribbean community, raised tension. There was also an increase in racial harassment on local council housing estates, which was largely ignored by the housing department.

== Riot ==
It is unclear why the riot started; some sources suggest that it was as a result of police ripping a customer's trousers and refusing to pay, others that they were attacked as they removed alcohol from the café which did not have a drinks licence. According to The Guardian newspaper, 100–200 black and white youths were involved. However other sources estimate the size of the crowd at about 2000. The riot continued for many hours and caused much damage to a branch of Lloyds Bank and a post office. Several fire engines and 12 police cars were also damaged. At one point a police chief famously remarked: "Surely we should be advancing, not retreating?" 130 people were arrested and 90 were charged. The next day, The Daily Telegraph carried a headline stating "19 Police Hurt in Black Riot" and blamed lack of parental care.

== Aftermath ==
Nineteen policemen and six other people were taken to hospital, including a cameraman and a photographer from the Western Daily Press. 16 of those arrested were prosecuted for riot, but all were either acquitted, had the charges dropped or were discharged after the jury failed to reach a verdict. Copycat riots in Southmead, a predominantly white working-class council estate, occurred soon after the St Pauls disturbance.

Later commentators suggested that poverty and the sus laws were more important causes of the riots than race. The House of Commons Home Affairs Select Committee held a session in Bristol and Home Secretary William Whitelaw came to the city to hold meetings with the local authorities and representatives of the black community. Relations between police and the local community remained tense and reached a low point in 1986 when 600 police raided the Black and White Café again in an action named Operation Delivery. It took intervention by local Member of Parliament William Waldegrave to persuade the police to scale down their policy of containment.

The Black and White Café had long had a reputation as a drug den and was allegedly raided more times by the police than any other premises in the country. In 2003 Bristol City Council used its powers of compulsory purchase and in 2005 the building was demolished and has now been replaced by new homes.

When cabinet papers were released 30 years later, they showed that Home Secretary William Whitelaw had reported that the Chief Constable "accepted that the police had made errors in the initial stages of the incident but [his] subsequent decision to withdraw all officers from the area for several hours had been the only one open to him at the time". Whitelaw said that a full public inquiry was undesirable as it would only lead to the police being criticised for no good purpose, and that not every controversial matter should lead to such an inquiry.

== See also ==
- Urban riots
