= Richard Bell (music producer) =

Jamaican record producer and label-owner

Richard "Bello" Bell is a Jamaican record producer and label-owner who launched the Star Trail label in around 1989 along with Garnet Dalley. He began by producing artists such as Beres Hammond and Hugh Griffith, but had his greatest successes in 1992 with Garnett Silk's "Hello Africa", Yami Bolo's "Non-stop Loving", and other successful singles by Leroy Smart and General Degree. Bell has also worked with leading dancehall artists including Capleton, Sizzla, and Anthony B, with whom he had a long and successful relationship between the mid-1990s and mid-2000s, and long-established singers such as Gregory Isaacs, Mykal Rose, and Everton Blender.

Bell is one of the best-known adherents of the Bobo Ashanti branch of Rastafari in Jamaican music, and his Star Trail records was one of the leading labels in the resurgence of Rastafari in reggae of the mid-1990s.

== Productions ==
- Beres Hammond - Love Affair (1992)
- Fleshy Ranks - Bustin Out (1994)
- Beres Hammond - In Control (1994)
- Everton Blender - Lift Up Your Head (1994)
- Gregory Isaacs - My Poor Heart (1994)
- Nardo Ranks - Cool and Humble (1995)
- Beres Hammond - Expression (1995)
- Capleton - Prophecy (1995)
- Beres Hammond - Love From a Distance (1996)
- Everton Blender - Piece of the Blender (1996)
- Beres Hammond - Getting Stronger (1997)
- Tony Rebel - If Jah (1998)
- Anthony B - Universal Struggle (1998)
- Derrick Lara - All About Life (1999)
- Determine - Freedom Chant (1999)
- Third World - Generation Coming (1999)
- Norris Man - Persistence (2000)
- Anthony B - That's Life (2001)
- Beres Hammond - Love has no Boundaries (2004)
