= Everton Blender =

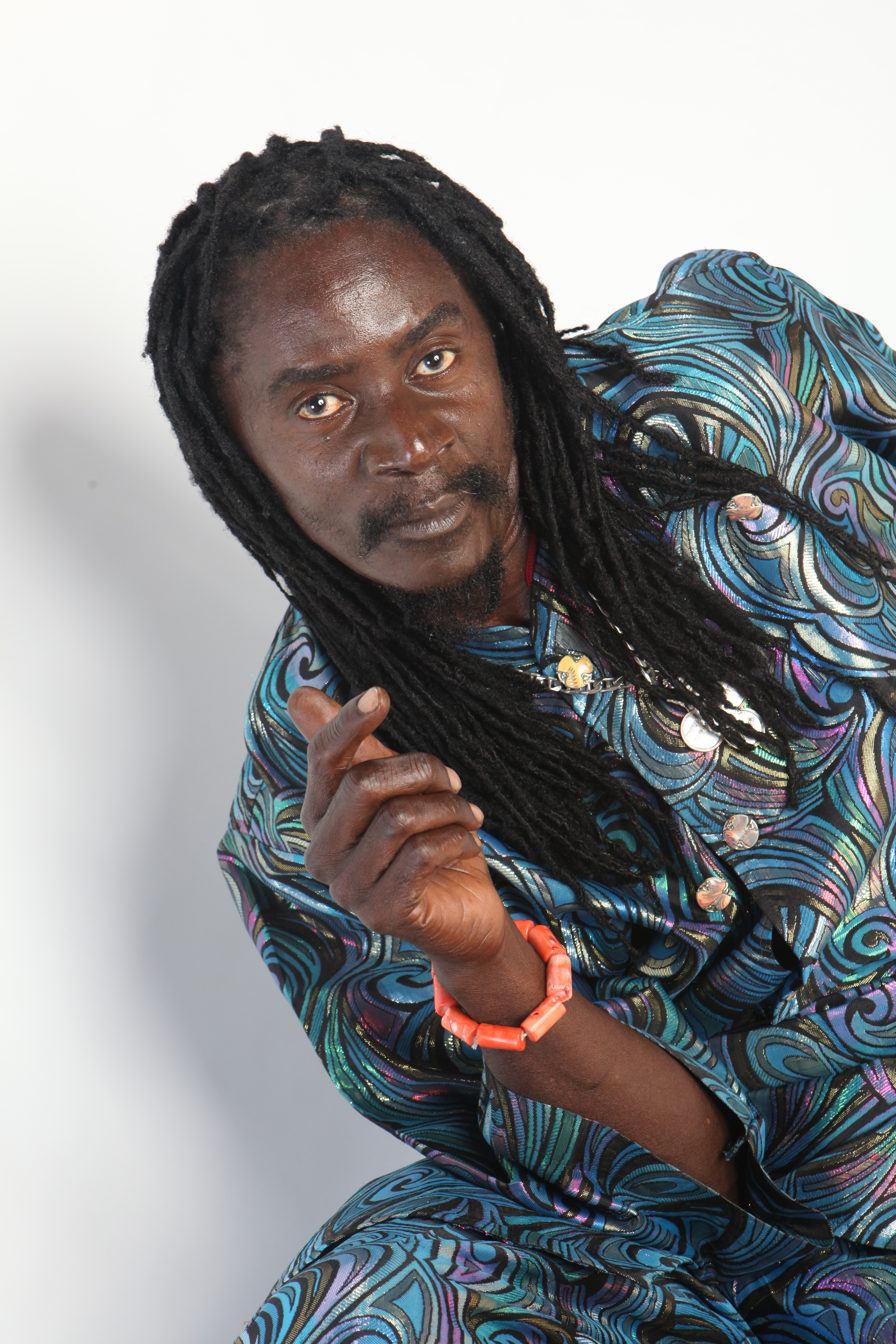
- Everton Blender in 2011

Background information
- Born: Everton Dennis Williams; 21 November 1954 (age 71)
- Origin: Clarendon, Jamaica
- Genres: Reggae
- Occupations: Singer-songwriter, producer
- Years active: late 1970s – Present
- Labels: Heartbeat, Greensleeves, Star Trail, Malako, Rounder, Blend Dem, explorer

Everton Blender (born 21 November 1954) Everton Dennis Williams, in Clarendon, Jamaica, is a reggae singer and producer, known for his smooth, crooning, tenor vocals, up-tempo arrangements, and spiritually uplifting themes, successfully bridging the gap between roots reggae and dancehall.

== Biography ==
Williams was born in Clarendon parish but grew up on Maxfield Avenue, Kingston. Williams began his career singing in an amateur talent contest in the late 1970s at Kingston's Bohemia Club, singing Dennis Brown songs under the name "Babbaru". He won the contest at the second attempt. He performed with the Destiny Outernational, Master Voice and Santex sound systems, and released several singles, including "Where Is Love" in 1979 and "Ba Ba Black Sheep" in 1985. He failed to achieve commercial success, however, and he withdrew from the music business, returning to his trade as a house painter.

Blender returned to music in the early 1990s when Garnett Silk, who had also worked with Destiny, introduced him to record producer Richard Bell, who signed him to his Star Trail label. This time around, Blender achieved success straight away, with "We No Jus' a Come," becoming a hit in Jamaica. Blender's success spread to the United Kingdom where his first album, Lift Up Your Head, reached number four on the Black Echoes music chart. The title track from the album was nominated for a Jamaican Music Award. Further albums and singles followed, with his early singles from the second phase of his career collected on the album A Piece of da Blender: The Singles, released in 1996.

Blender was one of the most prominent singers in the 1990s return to 'cultural' reggae, along with the likes of Garnett Silk and Luciano.

He has released several albums on Heartbeat Records and also set up his own Blend Dem Productions label, working with artists such as Prezident Brown, Admiral Tibet, Louie Culture, Jah Mason, Spanner Banner, Richie Spice, and Anthony B, as well as producing his own recordings.

Blender once described his songwriting process: "Well we just meditate, and a vibe just come to us, or we just sit in and bring tune from scratch without melodies or anything, and melodies come to you later". Blender has rejected the slack lyrics that have become common in reggae, stating "If the people tell you that them want rubbish, you know say them nuff fi get rubbish. Them fi get good things fi keep them internal and external clean. Never to fail, always righteousness. That's what we're working for".

Blender has toured worldwide. He toured Africa in 1999 to enthusiastic audiences, of which he said "they need to know about their culture ... some people like to come out and see Jamaican culture". In 2019 he did two very successful European tours with Thomas Evers of Rockers Artist Agency.

== Awards ==
Blender received the Chicago Martins International award, and South Florida Reggae/Soca awards in 1996 and 1997 in the "Most Improved Entertainer" category.

== Album discography ==
- Lift Up Your Head (1994) Star Trail/Heartbeat
- Blend Dem (1995) Malako
- Piece of da Blender: The Singles (1996) Heartbeat
- Where Do The Children (1997) Heartbeat
- Rootsman Credential (1999) Heartbeat
- Live at the White River Reggae Bash (2000) Rounder
- World Corruption (2000) Greensleeves
- Visionary (2001) Heartbeat
- King Man (2003) Heartbeat/Blend Dem
- It's My Time (2005) Explorer
- Live in Berkeley (2007) 2B1 (DVD)
- Red Razor Riddim (2007) Zion High/Lustre Kings
- Higher Heights rEvolution (2011) Blend Dem
