= The All (album) =

Studio album by Smif-N-Wessun
- Released: February 22, 2019
- Genre: Hip hop
- Length: 43:28
- Label: Duck Down
- Producer: Tek & Steele (exec.); 9th Wonder (also exec.); Khrysis (also exec.); Eric Gabouer (also exec.); Eric Jones (also exec.); Nottz (also exec.)

Smif-N-Wessun chronology
Monumental (2011)	The All (2019)	Infinity (2025)

Professional ratings
Review scores
Source	Rating
Albumism	4/5 stars
Exclaim!	6/10
HipHopDX	3.9/5
RapReviews	8/10

The All is the sixth studio album by American hip hop duo Smif-N-Wessun. It was released on February 22, 2019, through Duck Down Music. The album was produced by 9th Wonder and members of his production team, the Soul Council, including Khrysis, Eric G., E. Jones, and Nottz. It features guest appearances from Heather Victoria, GQ, Musiq Soulchild, Raekwon, Rapsody, Rick Ross, and SmittytheCAINSMITH.

== Track listing ==
No.	Title	Writer(s)	Producer(s)	Length
1.	"The Education of Smif-N-Wessun" (Intro)	Darrell Yates Jr.; Tekomin Williams; Eric Jones; Louis Farrakhan	E. Jones	3:54
2.	"Testify"	Yates Jr.; Williams; Christopher Tyson	Khrysis	1:28
3.	"Dreamland" (featuring Raekwon and Heather Victoria)	Yates Jr.; Williams; Corey Woods; Patrick Douthit	9th Wonder	3:42
4.	"Ocean Drive" (featuring Musiq Soulchild and Rapsody)	Yates Jr.; Williams; Tyson; Talib Johnson; Marlanna Evans	Khrysis	4:55
5.	"Let It Go"	Yates Jr.; Williams; Douthit	9th Wonder	3:04
6.	"Letter 4 U" (featuring SmittytheCAINSMITH)	Yates Jr.; Williams; Tyson	Khrysis	4:37
7.	"Let Me Tell Ya" (featuring Rick Ross)	Yates Jr.; Williams; Dominick Lamb; William Roberts II	Nottz	4:10
8.	"The A.L.L."	Yates Jr.; Williams; Douthit	9th Wonder	2:51
9.	"We Good" (featuring GQ and Heather Victoria)	Yates Jr.; Williams; Heather Victoria; Quentin Isaiah Thomas; Tyson	Khrysis	4:48
10.	"Stahfallah"	Yates Jr.; Williams; Tyson	Khrysis	2:52
11.	"Illusions"	Yates Jr.; Williams; Tyson	Khrysis	3:39
12.	"One Time"	Yates Jr.; Williams; Eric Gabouer	Eric G.	3:28
Total length:				43:28

== Personnel ==
- Darrell "Steele" Yates Jr. – main artist, executive producer
- Tekomin "Tek" Williams – main artist, executive producer
- Heather Victoria – featured artist (tracks: 3, 9)
- Corey "Raekwon" Woods – featured artist (track 3)
- Talib "Musiq Soulchild" Johnson – featured artist (track 4)
- Marlanna "Rapsody" Evans – featured artist (track 4)
- SmittytheCAINSMITH – featured artist (track 6)
- William "Rick Ross" Roberts II – featured artist (track 7)
- Quentin "GQ" Thomas – featured artist (track 9)
- Eric Jones – producer (track 1), executive producer
- Christopher "Khrysis" Tyson – producer (tracks: 2, 4, 6, 9-11), executive producer
- Patrick "9th Wonder" Douthit – producer (tracks: 3, 5, 8), executive producer
- Dominick "Nottz" Lamb – producer (track 7), executive producer
- Eric Gabouer – producer (track 12), executive producer
- Kenyatta "Buckshot" Blake – associate executive producer
- Drew "Dru-Ha" Friedman – associate executive producer
- Tanda Francis – design
- Akintola Hanif – photography
- Robert Adam Mayer – photography
