= Monumental (album) =

Studio album by Pete Rock & Smif-N-Wessun
- Released: June 28, 2011
- Recorded: 2010–11
- Studio: DaMan Studios (New York, NY)
- Genre: Hip hop
- Length: 57:43
- Label: Duck Down
- Producer: Pete Rock (also exec.)

Pete Rock chronology
NY's Finest (2008)	Monumental (2011)	PeteStrumentals 2 (2015)

Smif-N-Wessun chronology
Smif-n-Wessun: The Album (2007)	Monumental (2011)	The All (2019)

Singles from Monumental
- 1. "Prevail" Released: September 14, 2010; 2. "That's Hard" Released: May 17, 2011; 3. "Monumental" Released: June 15, 2011

Monumental is a collaborative studio album by American rapper and record producer Pete Rock and hip hop duo Smif-N-Wessun. It was released on June 28, 2011, through Duck Down Music. The recording sessions took place at DaMan Studios in New York. The album was produced by Pete Rock, who also served as executive producer together with Steele and Tek. It features guest appearances from Black Rob, Buckshot, Bun B, Freeway, Heltah Skeltah, Hurricane G, Jahdan Blakkamoore, Memphis Bleek, Raekwon, Styles P, Top Dog, and Tyler Woods. The album peaked at number 110 on the Billboard 200 and number 24 on the Top R&B/Hip-Hop Albums.

== Critical reception ==
Professional ratings
Review scores
Source	Rating
The A.V. Club	B
Beats Per Minute	79%
HipHopDX	4/5
laut.de	4/5 stars
RapReviews	5.5/10
XXL	3/5 (L)

Monumental was met with generally favorable reviews. At Album of the Year, which assigns a normalized rating out of 100 to reviews from mainstream publications, the album received an average score of 74, based on four reviews.

The cover photography by Daruis Vick was featured on Pitchfork's "The Worst Album Covers of 2011" list.

== Track listing ==
All music is composed by Pete Rock.

No.	Title	Writer(s)	Length
1.	"Intro"	Peter Phillips	1:18
2.	"Monumental" (featuring Tyler Woods)	Phillips; Darrell Yates, Jr.; Tekomin Williams; Tyler Woods	4:31
3.	"Prevail" (featuring Raekwon)	Yates, Jr.; Williams; Corey Woods; Phillips	2:40
4.	"That's Hard" (featuring Sean Price and Styles P)	Yates, Jr.; Williams; Sean Price; David Styles; Phillips	4:13
5.	"Top of the World" (featuring Memphis Bleek)	Yates, Jr.; Williams; Malik Cox; Phillips	4:58
6.	"Feel Me" (featuring Rock and Bun B)	Yates, Jr.; Williams; Jahmal Bush; Bernard Freeman; Phillips	5:09
7.	"Roses" (featuring Freeway)	Yates, Jr.; Williams; Leslie Pridgen; Phillips	4:25
8.	"Fire"	Yates, Jr.; Williams; Phillips	4:22
9.	"This One" (featuring Top Dog and Jahdan Blakkamoore)	Yates, Jr.; Williams; Dashawn Yates; Phillips	4:05
10.	"Do It" (featuring Hurricane G)	Yates, Jr.; Williams; Gloria Rodríguez; Phillips	5:16
11.	"Night Time" (featuring Buckshot)	Phillips; Yates, Jr.; Williams; Kenyatta Blake	5:05
12.	"(I'm A) Stand Up Guy" (featuring Black Rob)	Yates, Jr.; Williams; Robert Ross; Phillips	3:45
13.	"Go Off"	Yates, Jr.; Williams; Phillips	2:41
14.	"Time to Say"	Yates, Jr.; Williams; Phillips	5:15
Total length:			57:43

== Personnel ==
- Peter "Pete Rock" Phillips – producer, mixing, executive producer
- "Dan The Man" Humiston – mixing
- Michael Sarsfield – mastering
- C/4 – engineering
- Killa Ben – engineering
- M Nasty – engineering
- Rob "Giambi" Garcia – engineering
- Darrell "Steele" Yates, Jr. – executive producer
- Tekomin "Tek" Williams – executive producer
- Kenyatta "Buckshot" Blake – associate executive producer
- Drew "Dru-Ha" Friedman – associate executive producer
- Darius Vick – photography (front cover)
- Skrilla – additional artwork

== Charts ==
Chart (2011)	Peak position
US Billboard 200	110
US Top R&B/Hip-Hop Albums (Billboard)	24
US Top Rap Albums (Billboard)	15
US Independent Albums (Billboard)	18
