= Helén Eriksen =

Norwegian jazz musician, songwriter and arranger

- Born: 19 October 1971 (age 54); Dale, Vaksdal Municipality, Hordaland
- Origin: Norway
- Genres: Jazz
- Occupations: Composer, jazz musician
- Instrument: Saxophone
- Labels: Blue Note; Curling Legs
- Website: Helén Eriksen on Myspace

Helén Eriksen (born 19 October 1971 in Dale, Norway) is a Norwegian Jazz musician (saxophone and vocals), songwriter and music arranger.

== Career ==
In the period 1993 to 1995 she was a member of the Bergen-based pop group Animal Farm. In 1996 she released her first solo album Standards on the jazz record label Blue Note Records. The album was produced by hip-hop producer Tommy Tee and gave her the award as newcomer at Spellemannprisen 1996. Also her next album was released on Blue Note and produced by Tommy Tee, until in 2000 she released the album City Dust on the Norwegian label Curling Legs. City Dust was recorded with Jørgen Træen as producer and was a cleaner jazz album than her first and second. Her fourth album, Small Hall Classic, was released in 2006 with produced by Kato Ådland and Hans Petter Gundersen as producers, also known as "The Sensible Twins". She is the first and only Norwegian artist that have released two albums on Blue Note Records.

Eriksen has created her own distinctive style, and has participated as a guest artist on numerous albums, for artists like DumDum Boys, Pogo Pops, Sondre Lerche, Tommy Tee, Son of Light, and BLee. She collaborated in 1999 with jazz legend and saxophonist Alf Kjellman.

== Honors ==
- 1996: Spellemannprisen in the class Newcomer for the album Standards

== Discography (in selection) ==
=== Solo albums ===
- 1996: Standards (Blue Note)
- 1998: Lovevirgin (Blue Note)
- 2000: City Dust (Curling Legs)
- 2006: Small Hall Classic (New Records)

=== Collaborations ===
Within Disorient

- 1996: Terra Morte (Shrike Records)

With DumDum Boys,

- 1998: Totem (Oh Yeah!)

With Sondre Lerche

- 2001: Faces Down (Virgin Records)

Within The Brimstone Solar Radiation Band

- 2009: Smorgasbord (Tinnitus Recordings)

Awards
| Preceded by Green Cortinas | Recipient of the Newcomer Spellemannprisen; 1996 | Succeeded by Locomotives |
