= St Pauls, Bristol =

Inner suburb of Bristol

Coordinates: 51.4656°N 2.5820°W

St Paul's
- Location within Bristol
- OS grid reference: ST596742
- Unitary authority: Bristol
- Ceremonial county: Bristol
- Region: South West
- Country: England
- Sovereign state: United Kingdom
- Post town: BRISTOL
- Postcode district: BS2
- Dialling code: 0117
- Police: Avon and Somerset
- Fire: Avon
- Ambulance: South Western
- UK Parliament: Bristol Central

St Pauls (also written St Paul's) is an inner suburb of Bristol, England, lying just northeast of the city centre and west of the M32. It is bounded by the A38 (Stokes Croft), the B4051 (Ashley Road), the A4032 (Newfoundland Way) and the A4044 (Newfoundland Street), although the River Frome was traditionally the eastern boundary before the A4032 was constructed. St Pauls was laid out in the early 18th century as one of Bristol's first suburbs.

== History ==
In the 1870s, the Brooks Dye Works opened on the edge of St Paul's and became a major local employer, leading to the construction of terraced houses. Together with migration to Bristol, both from overseas and within Britain, this led to St Paul's becoming a densely populated suburb by the Victorian era.

The area was bomb damaged during World War II. Rebuilding and investment was focused on new housing estates such as Hartcliffe and Southmead rather than St Paul's, and this contributed to a decline in the quality of the area. During the large-scale immigration of the 1950s, many people moved from Jamaica and Ireland, and settled in St Paul's.

In 1963 St Paul's became the focus of attention when members of the British African-Caribbean community organised the Bristol Bus Boycott to protest against the racist employment policy of the Bristol Omnibus Company which operated a colour bar, refusing employment to non-white workers as bus crews. This policy was overturned in August of that year after sixty days of protest and the action helped establish the Race Relations Act 1968.

By the late 1960s, the Bishop Street area became a focal point for housing activism following reports of extreme deprivation, poor sanitation, and conditions overall equated to a shanty town or ghetto. In 1967, local activist Owen Henry and the Commonwealth Co-ordinated Committee petitioned Parliament over the neglect of the neighbourhood's derelict terraces, leading to a two-year acceleration of the district's first modern housing scheme, St Paul's Gardens (1968–1969). The development replaced the blighted 19th-century terraces with low-rise maisonettes and communal green spaces.

A riot followed a police raid on the Black and White Café in St Paul's on 2 April 1980. The St Paul's riot started when the police entered the café, knowing that the premises was being used for drug dealing. A customer had his trousers ripped and demanded compensation, which the police refused. A crowd outside then refused to allow the police to leave, and when back-up was called a riot started. The riots were quickly blamed on race, but both white and black youths from both Irish and Jamaican backgrounds and some English fought against the police and the problems are thought to have been linked instead to poverty and perceived social injustices, predominantly the Sus law and anti-Irish feelings from IRA activity on the mainland.

In 1990, St Paul's politician Kuomba Balogun, chairman of the Bristol West Labour Party, was reported in the Bristol Evening Post of 2 February, as saying: "We make a public plea to the IRA to consider ways of strongly giving some assistance to the armed wing of the ANC in the same light as Colonel Gaddafi sought to assist in the liberation of the people of Ireland." An early day motion was presented in Parliament calling on him to be expelled from the Labour Party.

This area of the city has also suffered from gun violence, reaching a high point in the early 2000s decade when rival Jamaican Yardie and drug gangs such as the British Aggi Crew fought turf wars over territory. The drugs war between the feuding factions was extinguished following en masse arrests of members of the Yardies and the Aggi Crew, with many of the foreign drug dealers being deported back to Jamaica.

The Black and White Café was closed in March 2005, and has been demolished to make way for houses after a compulsory purchase order. Now the area is experiencing a positive urban renewal with the St Paul's Unlimited scheme.

== Community ==
St Paul's has a large African-Caribbean population. The relative poverty of the area has created a strong community spirit which is shown in the St Pauls Carnival, similar to the Notting Hill Carnival in London. It has been run annually since 1967 except for a hiatus in 2015–2017, and by 2006 attracted an average of 40,000 people each year. The event is a vibrant parade with local primary schools and community groups joining in.

=== Parks ===
The main parks are St Agnes Park and St Paul's Park, together with Portland and Brunswick squares. Other green spaces include Grosvenor Road Triangle and Dalrymple Road Park. A footbridge over the A4032 allows access to nearby Riverside Park, alongside the Frome.

== Architecture ==
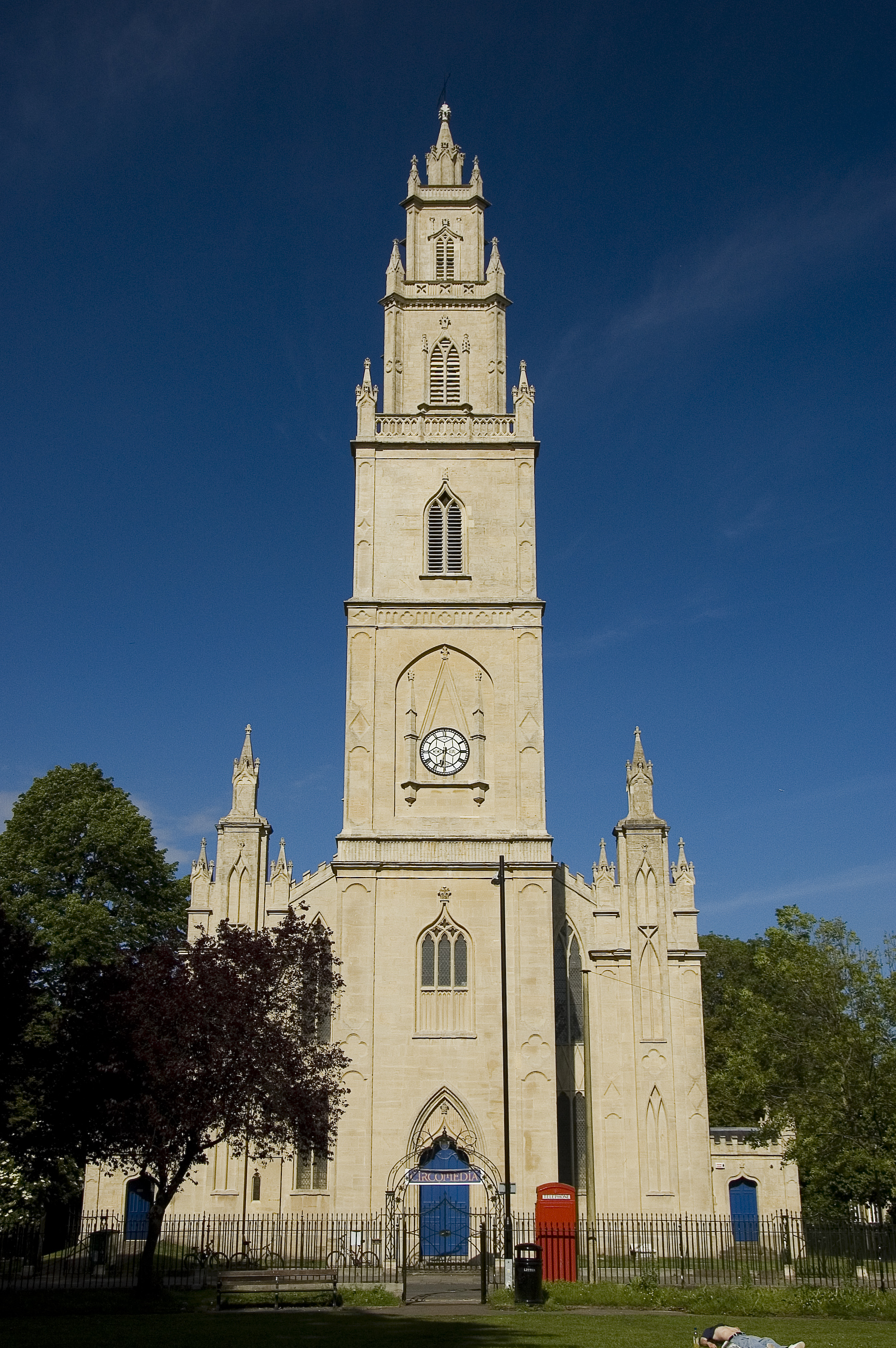
St Paul's Church, Bristol

Many of the buildings in St Paul's are from the Georgian period. Portland Square and St Paul's Church (completed in 1794) are fine examples of Georgian architecture; both were designed by Daniel Hague. The church fell into disuse in 1988, and in 2005 was converted for its present role as the home of Circomedia, a circus school. Edward William Godwin (1833–1886), a famous architect, lived in Portland Square. In contrast to the Georgian core, the district also contains the St Paul's Gardens estate, designed by City Architect Albert H. Clarke in a modernist fashion.

== Redevelopment plans ==
In May 2007, proposals were announced to build about 753,000 square feet (70,000 m^{2}) net of homes, offices and businesses, in the St Paul's area. The development, if approved, may include a 600 ft (180 m), 40-storey, tower next to the M32 motorway as a new entrance to the city. The tower would be a similar shape to the Swiss Re "gherkin" tower in London.

As of October 2022, updated plans for the Dove Lane site in St Pauls were unanimously approved by Bristol City Council. The approved development includes 358 new homes, with 20% designated as affordable housing, as well as retail units and workspace.

== Politics ==
St Pauls is part of the Ashley ward of Bristol City Council, along with St Agnes, St Andrews, Montpelier and St Werburghs. Ashley ward is represented by three elected councillors.
