= Black and White Café =

Former café in Bristol, England

Coordinates: 51.4645°N 2.5824°W

The Black and White Café was a café in St Pauls, Bristol, in the United Kingdom, that opened in 1971, owned by the Wilks family. The Caribbean food café had a reputation as a drug den and was raided more times by the police than any other premises in the country.

Events during a 1980 police raid on the café were a catalyst for the St Pauls riot. The café remained a centre for drug dealing and violent turf wars through the 1990s, with a peak in the early 2000s, and raids also revealed weapons and illegal immigrants. The Observer dubbed the café "Britain's most dangerous hard drug den".

The café closed in 2004 under legal action as a result of new anti-social behaviour legislation and was later demolished.

== Bertram Wilks ==
Bertram Wilks is a well-known member of the Bristol community. Born in Clarendon, Jamaica, in 1938, Wilks moved to the UK in 1959. He opened the Black and White Café in the St Pauls district of Bristol in 1971. Wilks has been featured in the books Policing Notting Hill: Fifty Years of Turbulence, by Tony Moore, and Uprising! The Police, the People and the Riots in Britain's Cities by Martin Kettle and Lucy Hodges.

Wilks is the father of singer-songwriter and producer Emmanuel Anebsa (born Stephen Emmanuel Wilks).
