= Warlocks (band) =

Norwegian hip-hop band

- Origin: Oslo, Norway
- Genres: Rap, Hip Hop
- Years active: 1992–present
- Labels: Tee Productions
- Members: André Eriksen “Tech Rock” Kevin Eriksen “Karma” Haakon Lund “Hawk”

Warlocks are a Norwegian hip hop trio formed in 1992. The group has also been heavily involved in the graffiti and b-boy scene in Oslo. The trio consists of producer Hawk and the rappers Tech Rock (André Eriksen) and Karma (Kevin Eriksen), who are twins. Warlocks released their debut album, Lyrical Marksmen, on a local independent label (dBut Records) in 1995, and the street buzz resulted in a contract with Norway's leading rap label, Tee Productions.

== History ==
Tee Productions owner Tommy Tee recorded and co-produced Warlocks’ second album Top Notch, and the first single off the album entered at number 3 on the Norwegian single chart. The album received a Norwegian Grammy nomination in 1997. The love from streets and the critical acclaim, combined with several negative tabloid newspaper stories about the group's involvement in graffiti, helped Warlocks become the best-selling rap act in Norway ever.

Warlocks released their third album, Mic Knights, in 1998. The set was another smash-hit, receiving outstanding reviews, not only from the Norwegian press; UK magazine Hip-Hop Connection labeled the track "Strictly Kings And Better" the best graffiti song ever recorded.

In 2001, the trio released another album; Afterlife. The love from the Norwegian music press was not an exception, as the new release received tremendous love and coverage from the Norwegian media. The first single, “Rap Game”, went straight to heavy rotation on the biggest Norwegian radio stations, and Warlocks received the prestigious Alarm Award for best hip-hop album. The group second single was the playful track called “Hahaha!”, accompanied by a hilarious video where the trio dresses up as foul police officers. Besides being aimed at the law enforcement, the song and video also focuses on the Oslo city council's Giuliani-adapted zero-tolerance politics towards graffiti writers.

After four years of silence, Warlocks in 2005 released their fifth album The Neverending Story. The album, celebrating their 10 years anniversary as recording artists, was released on Christer Falcks C+C Records with joining ventures from Tee Productions. Once again Warlocks manifested their position as one of Norway's best hip hop acts. Warlocks and Falck also got much attention for mocking with the established major record companies hypocrisy. Teaming up with fans all over Norway and buying their own records, they had their single “Stay Warm” making the top 5 on the Norwegian charts. They also got NRK (National TV station) to make a documentary about the scam, making the mission complete. As of 2010, Warlocks were in studio working with their sixth set and touring across Scandinavia.

== Discography ==
- Lyrical Marksmen (1995)
- Top Notch (1997)
- Mic Knights (1998)
- Afterlife (2001)
- The Neverending Story (2005)
