= Tee Productions =

- Founder: Tommy Tee
- Genre: Hip hop
- Country of origin: Oslo, Norway

Tee Productions is considered to be one of Scandinavia's largest Record label production it is hip hop record label owned by Tommy Tee, located in Oslo, Norway. Its signed artists include Diaz, Opaque, Warlocks, Son of light (earlier known as N-Light-N), Gatas Parlament and Jesse Jones.

Tee Productions is also looking to start in United States of America as "the marked is bigger" (quote - Tommy Tee)

Tee Production is also known as the "European Dr.Dre" which eventually made André Romell Young (Dr.Dre) interested in working with Tee Production.

== Albums ==
- N-Light-N: Deep Green (1997)
- Warlocks: Top Notch (1997)
- Tommy Tee: Bonds, Beats and Beliefs (1998)
- Warlocks: Mic knights (1998)
- T.P Allstars: Norske byggeklosser (1999)
- Diaz: 2050 (2000)
- Diverse artistar: Scandalnavia vol.1 (2000)
- Opaque: Gourmet Garbage (2001)
- Warlocks: Afterlife (2001)
- Gatas Parlament: Holdning over underholdning (2002)
- Son of Light: The homecoming (a return to family values) (EP) (2002)
- Diaz: Velkommen hjem, Andres (2003)
- Tommy Tee: Back to work (2004)
- Gatas Parlament: Fred, frihet og alt gratis (2004)
- Ken Ring & Tommy Tee: To legender Utan penger (2004)
- Tommy Tee: Tommy tycker om mej (2005)
- Diaz: Jessheimfanden (2005)
- Tommy Tee: No Studio No Time The Wait (2007)
- Gatas Parlament: Kidsa Har Alltid Rett (2008)
- Tommy Tee: 3 The Hard Way (2008)
- Tommy Tee: Studio time (2009)
- Jesse Jones: 12 Blokker 1 Vei Inn (2011)
- Gatas Parlament: Dette Forandrer Alt (2011)
- Son of Light: War Of The Words (2011)

== See also ==
- List of record labels
