= Tommy Tee =

Norwegian musical artist

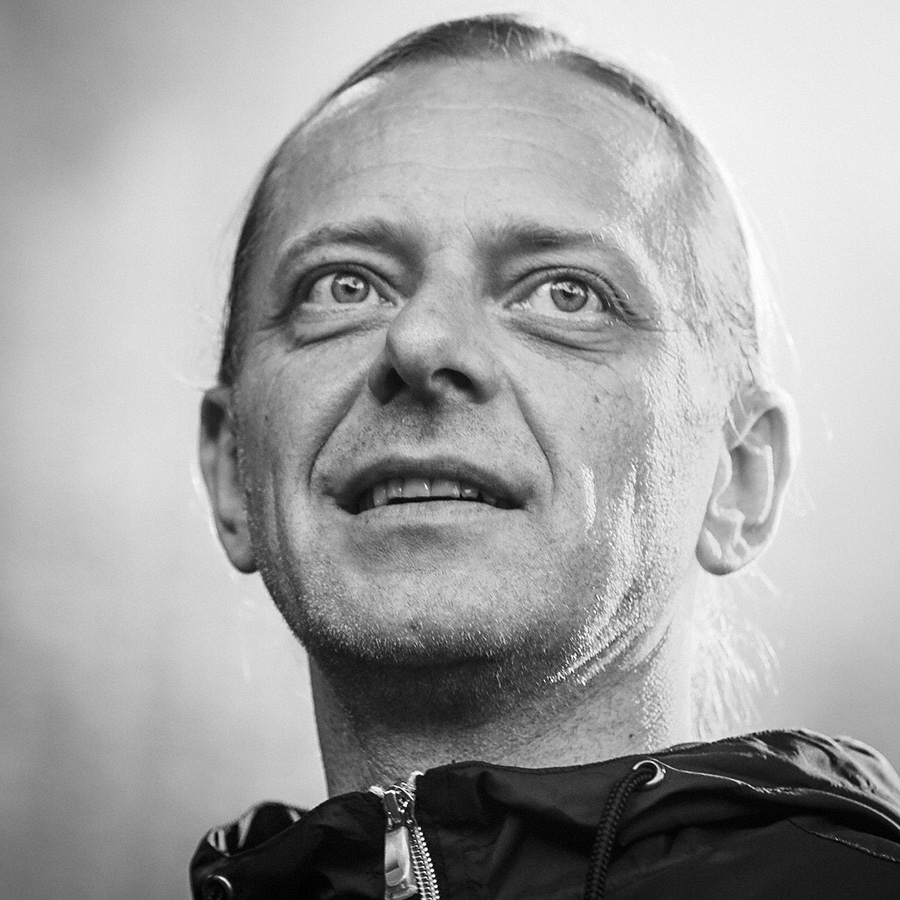

Background information
- Also known as: Father Blanco, The Crazy Minister
- Born: Tommy Flåten; 18 December 1971 (age 54)
- Genres: Rap, Hip Hop
- Occupations: Rapper, Songwriter, Producer Radio Host
- Years active: 1986–present
- Label: Tee Productions

Tommy Flåten (born 18 December 1971), best known by his stage name Tommy Tee, is a Norwegian record producer, rapper, broadcaster, record executive, concert promoter and magazine publisher. He is known as the godfather of Norwegian hip hop. Tee owns the label Tee Productions, which is located in Oslo, Norway and is Norway's leading hip hop label. He also published Norway's oldest graffiti magazine Fat Cap, and hosts a weekly national rap radio program.

== Early years (1980-1991) ==
Tommy Tee was first introduced to hip hop culture in the 1980s. He started as a graffiti artist and breakdancer, and later became moved on to music through DJing. He has been a radio and club DJ since mid 80's - something that sparked his interest in music production.

In 1989, Tee started Norway's first hip hop magazine Fat Cap which has been amongst the world's big graffiti magazines with international distribution.

Tommy Tee also started doing production work in the late 1980s but got more serious on the music throughout the 90's. He is credited for creating one of the first Norwegian Hip-Hop record on wax in 1989. The record "The Crazy Minister" (also Tee's nickname at the time) appeared on the group Snikk Snakk's album "More Muffens" in 1989. Tee has also said to have done a lot of tracks and remixes under many aliases from this time. For Ice Cube's 1990 Oslo concert he was the support act. He was the DJ for Norway's first rap group on record. Tee also arranged concerts by Ice Cube, Run DMC, The Fugees, De La Soul, A Tribe Called Quest and 50 Cent in Norway.

== Radio program ==
In 1992, Danish company Mega Records appointed Tee as its Norwegian sales manager. Norway's national broadcaster NRK offered him a prime time show on its new P3 network. The show is called "National Rap Show" and is still running. It quickly became popular and has featured guest acts such as Snoop Dogg, the Roots and Big Pun. DJ Herkules is the co-host of the show which is the channels longest lived show to date.

== Tee Productions (1995-present) ==
Tommy Tee started Tee Productions in 1995. He produced his first whole album, jazz artist Helén Eriksen's Standards, in 1996. This album was later released by Blue Note Records in Europe and Japan. Eriksen won a Norwegian Grammy as Best New Artist in 1996.

Tee's first album Bonds Beats and Beliefs was released in 1998 becoming Norway's most successful hip hop record. It featured Talib Kweli on the track "Day by Day" which was released as a single in the US. While the album was not officially released in the US, it did have a following on college radio and in hip hop magazines and also received reviews in Australia, England, Germany, Sweden and Denmark.

Tee then featured on a compilation album of the artists on his label T.P. Allstars: Norske Byggeklosser debuted in the Norwegian top 5 and was released in the US in late 1999 through Fat Beats Records. It featured US rapper Pete Rock on the first single "World Renown". The Source said the single was a "contender for Indie Release of the year."

The T.P. Allstars album also featured a collaboration between Swedish artist Petter and TP artist Diaz on the track "Crossing Borders" which was a top ten hit in Scandinavia in 1999. In return, Tee produced two tracks on Petter's album Bananrepubliken which went platinum and won three Swedish Grammy awards in 2001.

In 2004, Tee released a collaborative album with Ken Ring of Sweden called 2 Legender utan Penger, as well as a single two videos, BB Berättelsen and Måste Seja Hei. He also releases the mixtape series H.E.A.T. (vol1-6) and the album Fred, Frihet & Alt Gratis with group Gatas Parlament which got international exposure in CNN, XXL, Billboard and more.

Tommy Tee's recent work includes producing the song "Church" on Sean Price's 2007 album Jesus Price Supastar, two songs on the album "Ghetto Warfare" by M.O.P., and five songs off the Smif-n-Wessun album "The Album" (2007).

In 2008 Tee signed newcomer Jesse Jones to Tee Productions and released his debut "12 Blokker & 1 Vei Inn" on TP/EMI.

Tommy Tee released a street-album entitled "No Studio No Time" with artists like Grafh, Masta Ace, Agallah, Tim Dog, AG, Party Arty, Large Professor, JoJo Pellegrino and many more to warm up for the new official album.

Tommy Tee released the album Studio-Time on 5 October 2009. The album was highly praised in media and won a Norwegian Grammy (Spellemannsprisen) for best Rap/Hip-Hop album of the year. The album features artists like Bun B, Devin the Dude, Diamond D, Saigon, Kool Keith, Mad Con and many more.

In 2013 Tommy Tee debuted in his native language and made a hit single with rapper Don Martin. The song "Nilsen" is an ode to their hometown of Oslo and was instantly labeled a classic. The same year saw Tee recording and releasing his first own album in his native language. "Musikk Ække Viktig" (means "Music is not important") saw a new side of Tommy Tee as an artist - something liked by both fans and critics.

2013 was also the year in which Tommy Tee (maybe as little surprising to some) participated in the Norwegian version of the hit TV show "The Voice".

Tommy Tee won the prestigious Norwegian Honorary Grammy Award (Spellemann Hederspris) in 2016. He also released his latest album Bonds, Beats & Beliefs vol.2 featuring artists like M.O.P, Daytona, Mike Zoot, S.A.S., Skam, Oscar Blesson and many more. This album alongside his debut BBB was also printed on vinyl in an 8 LP box released in May 2016.

Recently, Tee built a brand new Tee Studios in central Oslo and is said to be working on projects with Oscar Blesson, Ken Ring, Opaque, Harry Fraud and more.

== Discography ==
=== Albums (as artist/producer) ===
- Bonds, Beats & Beliefs (1998)
- T.P. Allstars: Norske Byggeklosser (1999) (with other Tee artists)
- Various: ScandalNavia vol.1 (2000) (with various Scandinavian artists)
- Back To Work (2005)Official Tee Prod. mixtapealbum
- 2 Legender utan Penger with Ken Ring (2004)
- Tommy Tycker Om Mej (2005)
- No Studio No Time (2007)
- Absolute Music Tee (2007)
- 3 The Hard Way (EP Collection) (2009)
- No Pain No Profit (EP) (2009)
- Studio-Time (2009)
- Musikk Ække Viktig (2013)
- Bonds, Beats & Beliefs Vol.2 (2016)
- På Tur I Stockholm (2018)
- OVERSKUDD (2021)

=== Singles (as artist/producer) ===
- Aerosol (feat. Cope2)(1995)
- Takin Ova (feat. N-Light-N, Diaz, Warlocks, Opqaue & Father Blanco)(1998)
- Takin Ova US (feat. Shabam Sahdeeq, Mr. Eon, A.L., Joe Sexxx)(1998)
- Crossing Borders (feat. Diaz & Petter)(1999)
- International Connects (feat. Mike Zoot & El Da Sensei)(1999)
- Day by Day (feat. Talib Kweli and Punchline & Wordsworth) (1999)
- Blood Rush (feat. F.T. & P-Dap) (1999)
- World Renown (feat. Pete Rock, Mike Zoot, Large Pro & AG)(2000)
- Ya Heard A Him by Shockwave of Zombi Squad (2000)
- What's Your Name (feat. Nice N Smooth) (2002)
- BB Berättelsen (2004) with Ken Ring
- Måste Seja Hei (2004) with Ken Ring
- Gimme Dat (feat. Stat Quo, Rah Digga & Young Zee) (2006)
- Feelin' It (feat. JoJo Pellegrino & Noora Noor) (2007)
- Drabant (feat. Jesse Jones, Ken Ring & Saigon) (2008)
- Først & Fremst (feat. Jesse Jones & Lars Vaular) (2009)
- Keep Talking (feat. Madcon, A-Lee, Noora Noor & Loudmouf Choir) (2009)
- About That Girl (feat. CL Smooth, Tshawe (Mad Con) and Son of Light) (2009)
- Meet The Legends (feat. Bun B & Supa Sayed) (2010)
- Plocka Han (Ken Ring & Tommy Tee feat. M.O.P) (2011)
- Nilsen (Don Martin feat. Tommy Tee) (2013)
- Run The Streets (feat. Contagious) (2015)
- Æ E Old School (Joddski & Tommy Tee)(2016)
- Å Ha Noen Å Hate (feat. Mae, Joddski, Kenneth Engebretsen)(2017)
- Jeg Lover Deg (Tommy Tee & Joddski feat. Sisi, Klish, Kenneth Engebretsen)(2017)

=== Production credits ===
- The Crazy Minister by Tommy Tee/Snikk Snakk (1990)[albumtrack]
- Standards by Helén Eriksen (1996)[whole album]
- Top Notch by Warlocks (1998) [whole album - co produced with Hawk]
- Deep Green by N-Light-N (1997)[whole album]'
- Lovevirgin by Helén Eriksen (1998)[whole album]
- Mic Knights by Warlocks (1998) [3 songs]
- Bananrepubliken by Petter (1998) [2 songs]
- Mitt Hem Blir Ditt Heim by Ken Ring (1999) [2 songs]
- You Heard A Him by Shockwave (1999) [single]
- 2050 by Diaz (2000) [whole album]
- Trilogy by Souls of Mischief (2000) [2 songs]
- Ya Heard A Him by Shockwave of Zombi Squad (2000) [single]
- Gourmet Garbage by Opaque (2001)[whole album]
- Afterlife by Warlocks (2001) [2 songs]
- The Homecoming by Son of Light (2002) [whole album]
- Velkommen Hjem Andres by Diaz (2002) [whole album]
- Soundscience remix by Souls of Mischief ft. Del (2003) [single]
- What Is It by Masta Ace (2003) [track on Midnight Club 2 Original Soundtrack]
- The Great Escape by Paperboys (2003) [3 songs]
- It's All a Mad Con by MadCon (2004) [1 song]
- Klikk by SkillsMissseBaren (2004) [1 song]
- Planet Ph3 by Phenomena 3 (2004) [3 songs]
- Fred, Frihet & Alt Gratis by Gatas Parlament (2004) [5 songs]
- Difficult to Understand by The Loudmouf Choir (2004) [2 songs single]
- Neverending Story by Warlocks (2005) [1 song]
- Marxmen by MOP (2005) [1 song]
- Appointment with the Underground by Zombi Squad (2006) [3 songs]
- Jessheimfanden by Diaz (2006) [2 songs]
- Ghetto Warfare by MOP (2006) [1 song]
- Get Dirty Radio by AG (DITC) (2006) [2 songs]
- Disgusting by Bestruck (2006) [3 songs]
- Kohi De Browny by Kohinoor (2006) [5 songs + executive producer]
- Jesus Price Superstar by Sean Price (2007) [1 song]
- Äntligen Hemma by Ken Ring (2007) [4 songs (3 singles)]
- The Album by Smif N Wessun (2007) [5 songs]
- Kidsa har Alltid Rett by Gatas Parlament (2008) [5 songs]
- Im The One by Mira Craig (2009) [single]
- When Tomorrow Comes by Mira Craig (2009) [album track]
- Smile by Mira Craig (2009) [album track]
- Først & Fremst by Mange Schmidt ft. Thomas Rusiak (2009) [album track]
- Hip-Hop by Ken Ring (2009) [4 tracks]
- G-Optified (Tommy Tee Theme) by Saigon (2009) [album track]
- Copping Pleas by Saigon (2009) [album track]
- U Must Be Dreaming by The RZA ft. Kinetik 9 (2010) [single]
- Sannhets Serum by Joddski ft. Ida Maria (2010) [album track]
- Den Siste Revejakta by Joddski (2010) [album track]
- Lift It Up by Son of Light (2010) [single]
- Sminke by Karpe Diem ft. Masta Ace (2010) [album track]
- Kem Skøt Siv Jensen by [Lars Vaular] (2010) [album track]
- Utenfor Oslo, Utenfor Overalt by [Lars Vaular] ft. Nephew (2010) [album track]
- Helt om Natten Helt om Dagen by [Lars Vaular] ft. Jesse Jones (2010) [album track]
- Kommer Aldri Inn by Jesse Jones (2010) [single]
- 12 Blokker og 1 vei Inn by Jesse Jones (2011) [full album]
- War of The Words by Son of Light (2011) [Full Album]
- Cameltoe by The Loudmouf Choir (2012) [Full album]
- 100 by DRM (2012) [single]
- Oppvåkningen by Vinni (2012) [album track]
- Halve Meg by Vinni (2012) [single]
- Electric Feet by Bertine Zetlitz (2012) [3 songs]
- Richard Bravo by Pumba (2013) [whole album]
- Kollektiv Kollaps by Oter (2012) [1 track]
- En Gang Romsåsgutt Alltid Romsåsgutt by Don Martin (2013) [whole album]
- Jon Olav Koss by Spira (2016) [single]
- Røyk & Speil by Klish (2016) [2 tracks]
- Watch the Boy Grow by Oscar Blesson (2016) [whole EP]
- Løvehjerter.. by Don Martin (2016) [whole album]
- Eyes Closed by Oscar Blesson (2017) [single]
- Fill the Bag by Oscar Blesson (2017) [single]
- Loff by Mae X Chirag (2017) [single]
- Proletar Adel by Mae (2017) [full album]
- Botten by Dani M (2018) [albumtrack]
- På Plass by Mae (2018) [single]
- På Tur I Stockholm by Tommy Tee (2018) [full album]
- Maxi-Single by Mae (2019) [2 track maxi-single]
- Solidified by Oscar Blesson X Pasha (2019) [single]
- To the Grave by Oscar Blesson X Pasha (2019) [single]
- Maraton by King Skurk One (2019) [single]
- Selskapet by Selskapet (2019) [full EP]
- Pål Tøien by OnklP (2020) [albumtrack]

=== Mixtapes ===
- Florrockin' (1993)
- Beasts from the East vol.1. (1994)
- Beasts from the East vol.2. (1994)
- New York State of Mind (1995)
- Stikking vol. 1 & 2 (m/Diaz) (1995)
- Ol' to the New. (1999)
- Basic Education (m/Dj Herkules) (2001)
- Girls, Girls, Girls (2003)
- H.E.A.T. vol.1-6 (2004/2005)
- Golden Era (2006)

== External references ==
- Tommy Tee Allmusic article
- Tommy Tee on Myspace
