= Junior Kelly =

Jamaican reggae singer

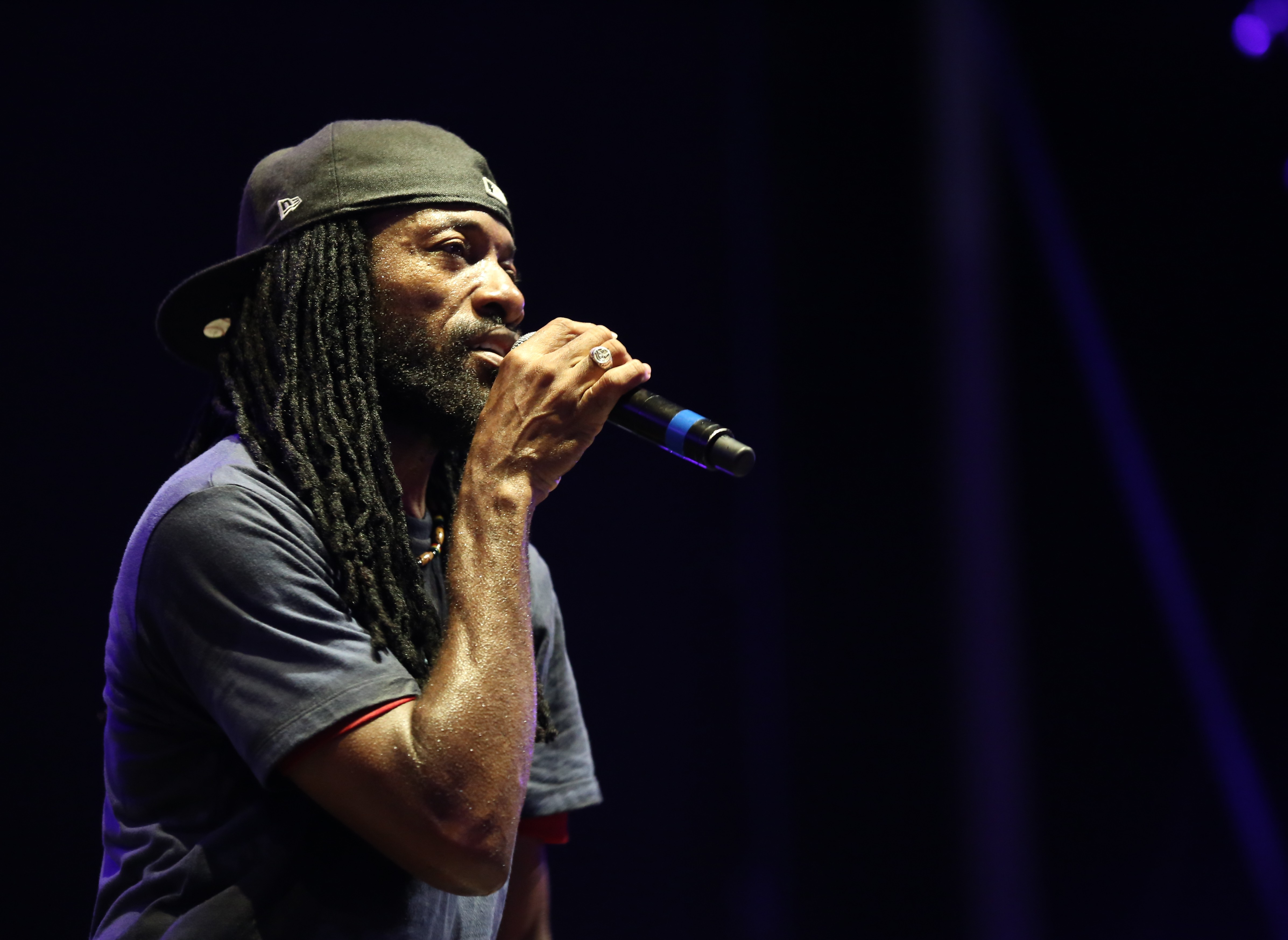
- Junior Kelly at Chiemsee Reggae Summer 2013

Background information
- Born: Keith Morgan; 23 September 1969 (age 57); Kingston, Jamaica
- Genre: Reggae
- Years active: 1985–present
- Labels: Jet Star; VP; Penitentiary; Irie Vibrations; Wontstop Record

Keith Morgan (born 23 September 1969), better known by his stage name Junior Kelly, is a Jamaican reggae singer.

== Career ==
Born in Kingston, Morgan was educated at St. Catherine High School. The younger brother of DJ Jim Kelly, he made his first recording in 1985, and after his brother's death worked under the name Junior Kelly.

A string of singles in the 1990s had limited success (his 1995 single "Go to Hell", an attack on the Jamaican political system, was banned from the airwaves in his home country), but his 1999 hit "If Love So Nice" led to an album, Rise, recorded in the UK with Mafia & Fluxy. "If Love So Nice" went on to further success both in Jamaica and internationally. His success prompted interest from VP Records, for whom he recorded the 2001 album Love So Nice, which included the hit "Boom Draw", and featured musicians such as Leroy Wallace, Dean Fraser, and Winston Bowen.

In 2001 he featured on singer-songwriter and producer Emmanuel Anebsa's track "Life is So Confusing".

Kelly's second album for VP, the largely self-produced Smile, was released in 2003. The 2005 album Tough Life featured a duet with June Lodge on "Love You Like That" (an update of her "Someone Loves You" hit). The Tough Life album also included Rasta Should Be Deeper, a hit song previously also released on Hi-Score Music that was recorded and mixed by Soundism's Vladi Vargas.

In 2010 he released Red Pond, the album's title a reference to the Spanish Town ghetto community, featuring contributions from Ras Shiloh, Lukie D, and Queen Ifrica.

In late 2015 he released the album Urban Poet, followed by promotional tours of Europe and the Caribbean. In 2019 he did a very successful European tour with Thomas Evers of Rockers Artist Agency to celebrate the 25th anniversary of his hit album "Love so Nice".

== Discography ==
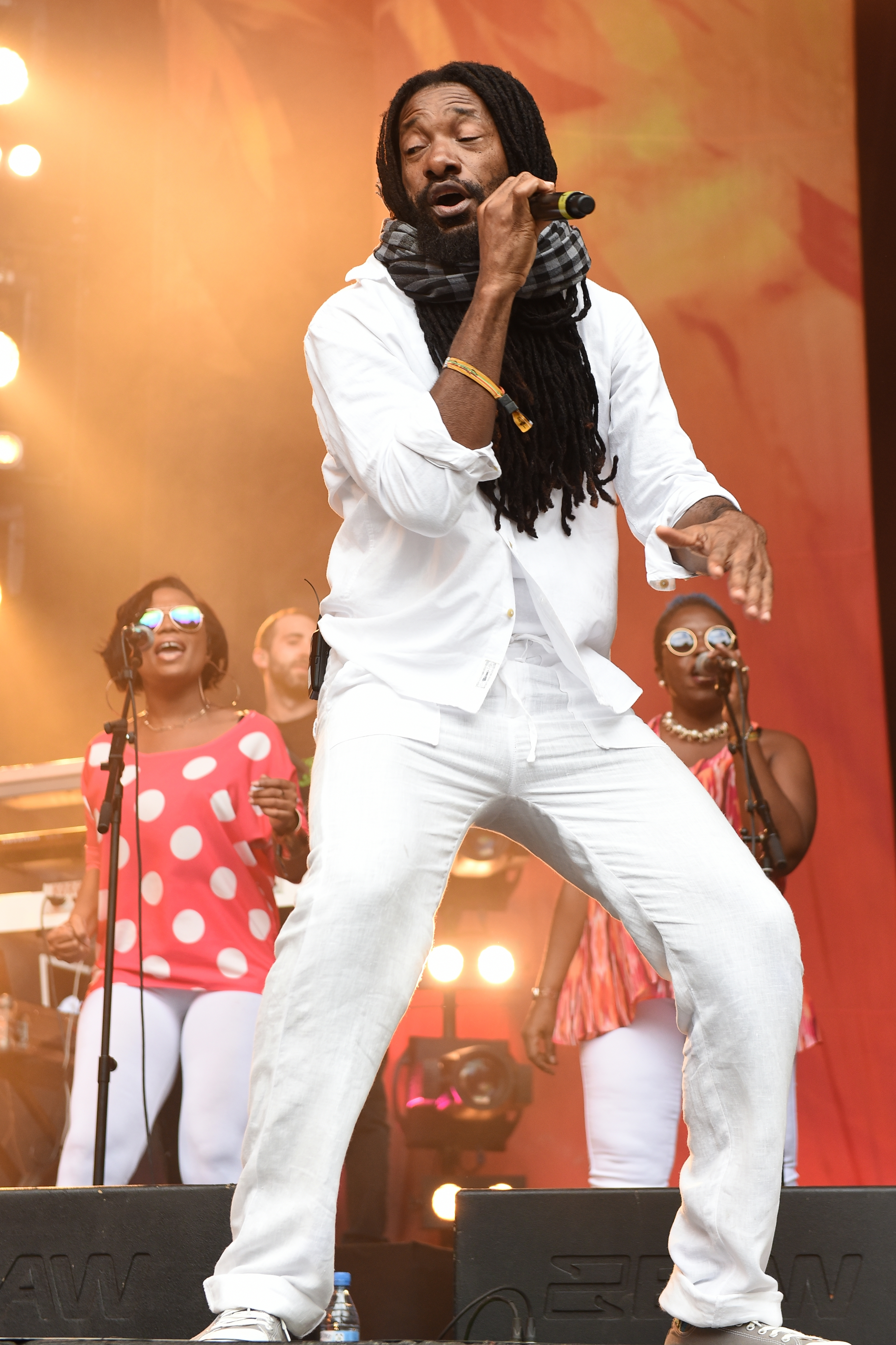
Junior Kelly in 2016

=== Albums ===
- Rise (2000), Charm
- Juvenile (2000), Jet Star
- Juvenile in Dub (2000), Jet Star
- Love So Nice (2001), VP
- Conscious Voice (2002), Penitentiary
- Bless (2003), Penitentiary
- Smile (2003), VP
- Creation (2004), Penitentiary
- Tough Life (2005), VP
- Red Pond (2010), VP
- Piece Of The Pie (2013), VP
- Urban Poet (2015), Irie Vibrations

Live

- Live in San Francisco (2007), 2B1

Split releases

- 3 Wise Men Volume II (2001) – with Sizzla, Luciano, and Qshandia
- The Five Disciples (2002) – with Sizzla, Anthony B, Luciano, and Capleton
- Five Disciples Part II (2003) – with Sizzla, Capleton, Luciano, and Anthony B
- Kings Of Zion (2003) – with Sizzla, Anthony B, and Capleton
- Toe 2 Toe 5 (2003) – with Sizzla
