= Ken Ring (rapper) =

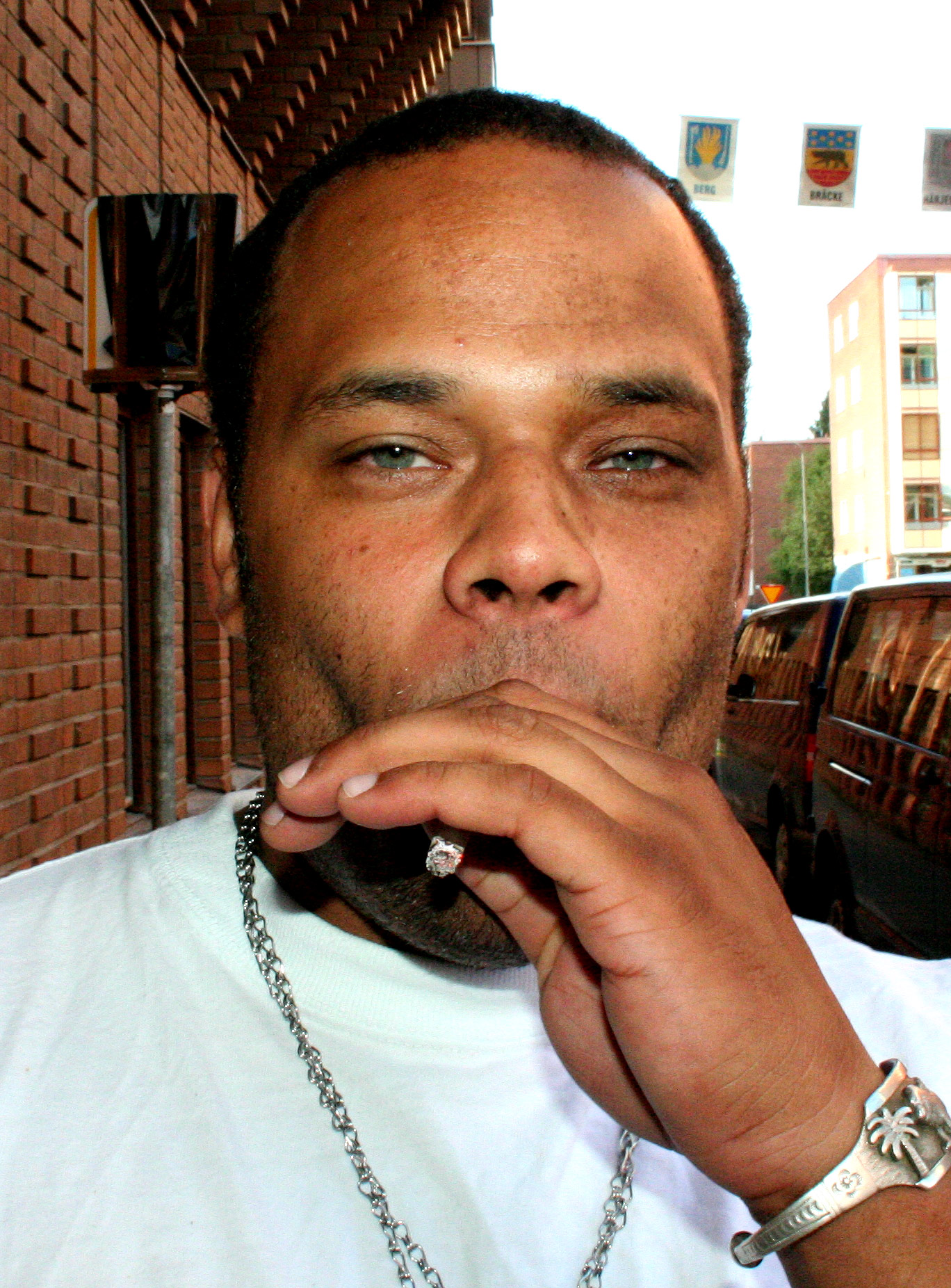

Background information
- Born: 29 January 1979 (age 47)
- Years active: 1994–present
- Labels: Pope Records, Barabazz, Tee Productions

Ken Ring (born 29 January 1979) is a Swedish rap artist.

== Career ==
Ring was born in Hässelby, a suburb of Stockholm. His breakthrough track was "Mamma", released in 1999. He released his first studio album later that year, entitled Vägen tillbaka, which included the single "Eld och djupa vatten". After appearing on Vattenfestivalen in Stockholm later in 1999, Ring was arrested for performing his song "Spräng regeringen", which featured lyrics referring to him breaking into the Royal Palace in Stockholm and raping Princess Madeleine.

Ring was later dropped from his record label due to the subsequent controversy, but after the release of his second studio album Mitt hem blir ditt hem in 2000. Ken Ring remained thereafter as an underground rapper, unable to find a willing record label. He continued releasing songs on the internet.

In 2004, Ken Ring started working with Norwegian producer Tommy Tee, and together they released the album Två legender utan pengar ("Two Legends Without Money") in 2004.

In 2013, Ken Ring participated in the TV show Så mycket bättre, which led to renewed media attention. Since January 2014, Ken Ring has been signed to the Orlando John talent agency.

On 12 April 2021, Ring announced his retirement from music via a LinkedIn post.

== Discography ==
=== Albums ===
Charting

Year	Album	Peak positions
Year	Album	SWE
1999	Vägen tillbaka	8
2000	Mitt hem blir ditt hem	16
2007	Äntligen hemma	28
2009	Hip Hop	9
2013	AkustiKen	25

Others

- Mellanspelet (2002)
- InblicKEN (2003)
- Det bortglömda (2003)
- 2 legender utan pengar (with Tommy Tee; 2004)
- KENnelklubben (2004)
- RubriKEN (2005)

=== Singles ===
Charting

Year	Single	Peak positions	Album
Year	Single	SWE	Album
2009	"Nu måste vi dra"	40	
2012	"Själen av en vän" (feat. Million Stylez)	25	
2013	"Människor som ingen vill se"	31	

Other singles

- "Gatuslang" (1998)
- "Tidiga demor" (1999)
- "Stockholm stad" (1999)
- "Stockholm stad 12"" (1999)
- "Mamma" (1999)
- "Eld och djupa vatten" (1999)
- "Dödens gränsland" (1999)
- "Vill inte veta" (2000)
- "Grabbarna från förorten" (2000)
- "Situation Stockholm" (2000)
- "Mitt hem blir ditt hem" (2000)
- "BB berättelsen" (featuring Tommy Tee) (2004)
- "Måste seja hei" (featuring Tommy Tee) (2004)
- "Cutta dom" (2006)
- "På väg hem (EP; 2006)
- "Det hände något på vägen hem" (EP; 2006)
- "Snart hemma" (EP; 2007)
- "Ta det lugnt" (2007)
- "Kelian" (2007)
- "STHLM CITY" (2008)
- "Hip Hop" (2009)
- "Helt Jävla Beng" (2010)
- "Plocka Han" (feat. Tommy tee and M.O.P) (2011)

=== Mixtapes ===
- "165 - Various Mixtapes" (1997)
- "165 - Unreleased Joints Vol. 1" (1999)
- "165 Allstars Vol. 1" (2000)
- "Ken Ring & BB Inc Kaddo Presents: Soundclap Vol. 1" (2005)
- "Ken Ring & BB Inc Kaddo Presents: Soundclap Vol. 2" (2005)
- "Ken Ring & BB Inc Kaddo Presents: Soundclap Vol. 3 (Svensk Hiphop Special)" (2005)
- "Ken Ring & BB Inc Kaddo Presents: Soundclap Vol. 4" (2005)
- "Ken Ring & BB Inc Kaddo Presents: Soundclap Vol. 5 (Hosted by Sam-E)" (2005)
- "Ken Ring & BB Inc Kaddo Presents: Soundclap Vol. 6 (XXX-special. Hosted by Bingo Rimér & Pernilla Lundberg)" (2006)
- "Shu Bre Express - Mixtape Vol. 1" (2008)
- "Mixtape "10"" (2009)
- "SommarbänKEN" (2009)
- "Kiprono" (2010)

== See also ==
- Swedish hip hop
