= Gatas Parlament =

Norwegian group of rap artists

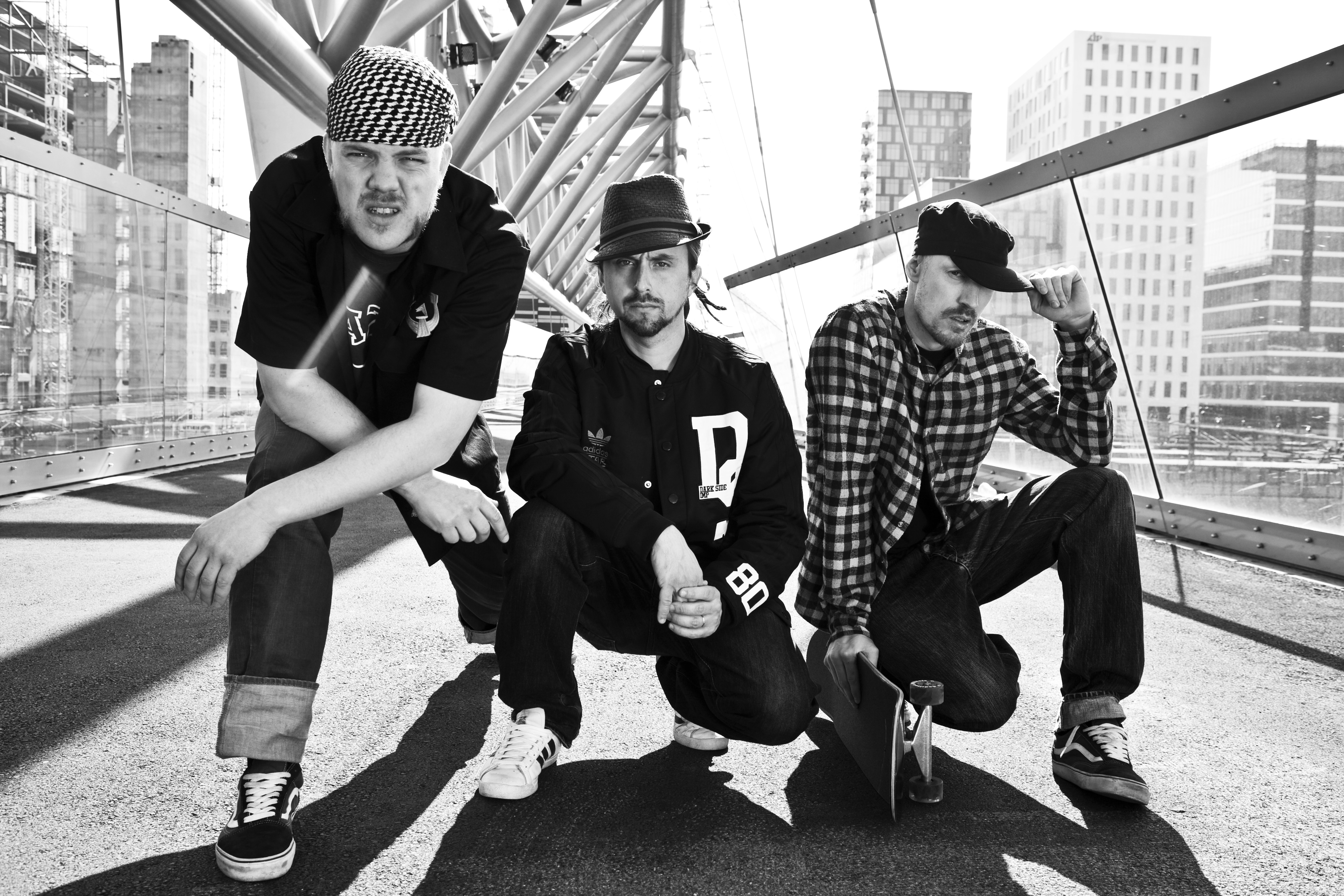

Background information
- Also known as: Kveldens Høydepunkt
- Origin: Oslo, Norway
- Genre: Hip hop
- Years active: 1993 to present
- Label: Tee Productions
- Members: Elling (Elling Borgersrud); Jester (Alex Molkom)
- Past members: Aslak Borgersrud; Don Martin
- Website: Homepage

Gatas Parlament (English: Parliament of the Street) is a Norwegian group of rap artists. It currently consists of artists Elling Borgersrud and Jester. The group was the first to release a hiphop-recording in their native language, Norwegian. All current and former members have strong left-leaning political views, and make their feelings on many things, including American president George W. Bush, a common motif in their lyrics.

Elling Borgersrud has stood for national election as a minor political candidate for the Red Electoral Alliance.

== History ==
Gatas Parlament started out in 1993, taking the name Kveldens Høydepunkt (Highlight of the Evening). Don Martin did not take to the name, however, and thus it was dropped. Later, they attended a public speech by Carl I. Hagen, the chairman of the right-wing party Progress Party (Fremskrittspartiet), where they threw eggs and rotten fruit at Hagen. This caused Hagen to comment that gatens parlament ruled the country, and the three rappers stuck with the name (the riksmål-wording of gaten was dropped for gata, more fitting for their sociolect).

The band caused controversy in Norway with their video "Antiamerikansk Dans" (Anti-American Dance) together with the Swedish rap artist Promoe and their website killhim.nu ("Kill him Now"), which claimed to collect money for a bounty on the head of George W. Bush. The campaign caused the American embassy in Norway to react, and prompted a Secret Service and Norwegian Police investigation into the band. The website was subsequently shut down. The case was dropped after months of controversy in Norwegian and European media.

During 2007 Gatas Parlament launched a collaboration with Hopalong Knut, a ska band from Trondheim which uses trønder dialect. When the two groups perform together, they call themselves Samvirkelaget (English: the workers' cooperative).

In 2011 founding member Aslak Borgersrud (brother of Elling Borgersrud) quit the band to pursue other interests and was replaced with Jester (Alex Molkom), who had been working as a producer and guest rapper for the band for years. Don Martin left the band in 2015 with some controversy after a period focusing on solo projects.

== Solo projects of members ==
- Founding member Aslak Borgersrud (brother of Elling) quit the band to pursue other interests
- Former Gatas Parlament's DJ Don Martin is a host of the radio program Goodshit Radio. He released his own album in 2013 titled En gang Romsåsgutt alltid Romsåsgutt.

== Discography ==
=== Albums ===
- Holdning Over Underholdning (2001)
- Bootlegs, B-sider & Bestiser (compilation) (2004)
- Fred, Frihet & Alt Gratis (2004)
- Kidsa Har Alltid Rett (2008)
- Apocalypso (2008)
- Dette Forandrer Alt (2011)
- Hold Det Realt (2016)

=== EPs ===
- Autobahn Til Union (1994)
- Slå Tilbake (1997)
- Counter Strike EP (2008)

=== Street records ===
- Bottlegs, Bsider og Bestiser (2004)
- 93 til Infinity (2007)
- Gateplata (2011)

=== Singles ===
- Naturkraft (1997)
- Stem Gatas Parlament (1999)
- Nå om da'n (2001)
- Bombefly (2004)
- Anti-amerikansk dans (2004)
- Spis de rike (2004)
