= Anthony B =

Jamaican deejay (born 1976)

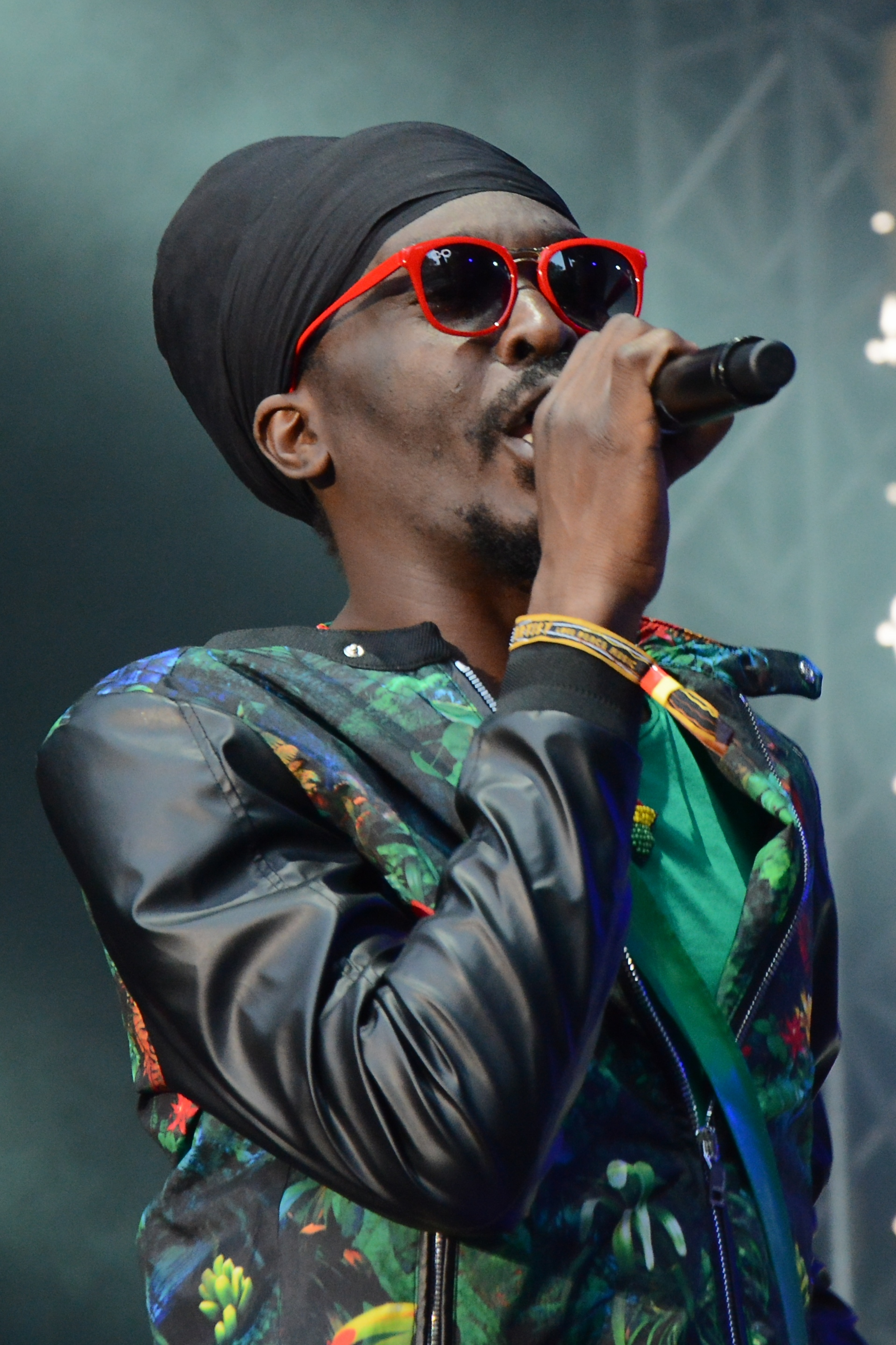
- Anthony B, Ruhr Reggae Summer 2014, Mülheim

Background information
- Born: Keith Anthony Blair; 31 March 1976 (age 50); Trelawny, Jamaica
- Genres: Reggae
- Instrument: vocals
- Years active: 1996-present
- Labels: VP, Greensleeves Records, Wontstop Record

Keith Anthony Blair (born 31 March 1976), better known by the stage name Anthony B, is a Jamaican DJ and member of the Rastafari movement.

== Biography ==
=== Early life ===
Blair grew up in rural Clark's Town in the northwestern parish of Trelawny in Jamaica. His deeply religious family life (his mother was a Seventh-day Adventist and his grandmother a Revivalist) imbued him with a profound spirituality. During his youth, his favourite singers were reggae legends Bob Marley and Peter Tosh, musicians who strongly influenced his own style. Peter Tosh's influence can definitely be heard in Anthony B's vocal delivery and revolutionary stance.

Anthony B adopted Rastafari movement beliefs as a teenager, a decision which was not well received by his family. The stubborn and determined Anthony B refused to give up his faith and his dreadlocks and moved to the home of his aunt and uncle in Portmore, St. Catherine. He is a member of the Bobo Ashanti branch of the movement. "Bobo Dreads", as they are known, are recognisable by their long robes and turbans. The strong Afrocentric pride and the other Rastafarian beliefs (or "overstandings" as Rastafarians prefer to call them) are reflected in his songs.

=== Career ===
While attending high school, Anthony B debuted as a deejay for the local sound system, Shaggy Hi-Power. In 1988, he befriended reggae artists such as Determine, Mega Banton, Ricky General and Terror Fabulous.

At this point in the reggae industry, singing "slack" songs about women was the popular thing to do. Anthony B did not believe in degrading women and chose to pen politically slanted songs instead. He collaborated with Little Devon and made his debut single "The Living is Hard" on the Wizard label in 1993. Anthony B tried many different producers before joining with Richard Bell, creating hits such as "Fire Pon Rome", "Raid Di Barn", "Rumour", and "Repentance Time". In late 1997, Anthony B released Universal Struggle, followed by a large number of albums since including 1999's Seven Seals, 2003's Street Knowledge, 2004's Untouchable which featured collaborations with artists including Wyclef Jean, Snoop Dogg & Bone Crusher, 2005's Black Star plus My Hope, and more recently, Life Over Death (2008).

In January 2013, he was charged with possession of marijuana with intent to distribute after being stopped in Georgia, United States, due to illegally tinted windows in the vehicle in which he was travelling; He subsequently had to cancel several shows in South America as he was not allowed to travel outside the US. Charges were later dropped.

In July 2013 he released Tribute to Legends, an album of cover versions of songs by artists such as Bob Marley, The Maytals, John Lennon, Ray Charles, Elvis Presley, and Ini Kamoze; Speaking of the album, he stated "I chose to make a tribute album to firstly show how much these legends influence my music and my life." In 2016, Anthony B released Tears Of Luv on his label Born Fire Music and collaborated with various producer around the world including Evidence Music on his track Life Good.

In May 2020, Anthony B released his 20th studio album titled, King In My Castle.

Anthony B tours extensively in Europe and North America. He has collaborated with many singer-songwriters and producers

Talking of his faith and music, Anthony B commented, "When we say 'burn fire' we don't mean take a match and light somebody, we are saying get rid of these things that are no good for humanity."

== Discography ==
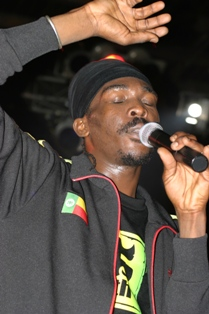
Anthony B performing in 2005

=== Albums ===
- Predator & Prey (1996, Alpha Enterprises)
- Real Revolutionary – UK / So Many Things – US (1996, Greensleeves)
- Universal Struggle (1997, VP Records)
- Seven Seals (1999, VP Records)
- More Love (2001, AO ! Records)
- That's Life (2001, VP Records)
- Street Knowledge (2003, VP Records)
- Wise Man Chant (2003, Black Scorpio)
- Smoke Free (2003, Bogalusa Records)
- Voice of Jamaica vol. 2 (2003, Nocturne)
- Judgment Time (2004, 2B1 Records)
- Justice Fight (2004, Nocturne)
- Untouchable (2004, Togetherness Records)
- Powers of Creation (2004, Nocturne)
- Black Star (2005, Greensleeves)
- Live on the Battlefield (2005, Jahmin' Records)
- Confused Times (2005, Penitentiary)
- My Hope (2005, AL.TA.FA.AN. / Minor 7 Flat 5)
- Gather and Come (2006 Penitentiary)
- Suffering Man (2006 Tad's Records)
- Higher Meditation (2007 Greensleeves)
- True Rastaman (2008 Penitentiary Records)
- Life Over Death (2008 Born Fire)
- Rise Up (2008 Greensleeves)
- Rasta Love (2011 Born Fire)
- Freedom Fighter (2012 Irievibrations)
- Choices (2012)
- My2K Vol. 1 (2013 Born Fire)
- Tribute to Legends (2013 Born Fire)
- Tears of Luv (2015 Born Fire)
- Anthony B (2016)
- King In My Castle (2020 Born Fire)
- Bread and Butter (2023 Ineffable Records/Born Fire)

=== Compilations ===
- Chanting Down Babylon (1997, Power Play); live, with Buju Banton
- 2 Strong (1998, Star Trail/VP Records); with Sizzla
- Anthony B & Idren (1998, Jamaican Vibes)
- Anthony B & Friends (1998, Rhino Records)
- Nazarene Vow (1999, Records Factory); with Junior Timba
- 3 Wise Men (1999, J&D); with Sizzla and Luciano
- One Mission (1999, J&D); with Capleton
- Saddle to the East (2001, Brick Wall); with Jah Mason and Steve Machete
- 4 Rebels (2001, VP Records); with Sizzla, Luciano, and Yami Bolo
- The Five Disciples (2001, Penitentiary / Jet Star); with Sizzla, Luciano, Junior Kelly, and Capleton
- We Three Kings (2001, AO ! Records); with Sizzla
- We Three Kings (2002, Navarre); with Capleton and Luciano
- Four The Hard Way (2002, City Hall); with Capleton, Sizzla, and Luciano
- Kings of Zion (2002, Jet Star); with Capleton, Sizzla, and Junior Kelly
- Reggae Max (2002, Jet Star)
- 5 Blazing Fires (2002, Fire Ball); with Admiral Tibbett, Sizzla, Capleton, Positive Jayz and Michael Fabulous
- Five Disciples Part II (2003, Jet Star); with Capleton, Luciano, Sizzla, and Jr. Kelly
- Kings of Zion vol. 3 (2005, Charm); with Capleton, Sizzla, and Turbulence
- Jah Warriors vol. III (2005, Penitentiary); with Luciano
- The Pow Pow Trilogy (2008, Pow Pow); with Turbulence and Jah Mason
- Encore (2010)
- NYC-2-Africa (2010, Suatomic Sound); with Subatomic Sound System, Nomadic Wax, Jahdan Blakkamoore, and Bajah
- Truthful Riddim (2020, Blaqk Sheep Music); with Julian Marley, Mr Vegas, Blaqk Sheep
- Guns Riddim (2021, Iyah Music); with LePrince and Maneaux
- Reggae Reload Vol. 1 (2022, Blaqk Sheep Music); with Busy Signal, Sizzla, Gyptian
