= Vladi Vargas =

- Origin: Västerås, Sweden
- Genres: Hip Hop, R&B, Reggae
- Occupations: Music Producer, Sound engineer, Songwriter
- Years active: 1986-present
- Website: www.vladivargas.com

Vladi Vargas (born 11 August 1971) is a music producer and sound engineer in Västerås, Sweden. Starting out as a Dj, he was one of the pioneers in the Hip Hop culture in Sweden. During the 1980s he participated in several national DJ competitions and rap battles. Later in the 1990s, Vladi Vargas began to produce music and worked more in recording studios.

Today, Vladi Vargas is linked to Soundism where he has been involved in a long list of Hip Hop and Reggae music productions. Many are record collector items, in 2025 Discogs listed more than 80 records where Vladi Vargas was credited.

As a sound engineer, his mixing or mastering includes, for example:

- Promoe's "White Man's Burden" and "Long Distance Runner" hip hop albums.
- Junior Kelly's "Rasta Should Be Deeper" reggae hit song.
- Embee featuring José Gonsalez "Send Someone Away" hip hop ethno cross over single.
- Måns Zelmerlöw "The Prayer" pop song.

Vladi Vargas has been credited for his work on "Tellings from Solitaria" by Embee, which was awarded with a Swedish Grammy for best hiphop/soul release in 2005. Hiphop group Looptroop Rockers was inducted to the Swedish Music Hall of Fame in 2017, citing albums "Modern Day City Symphony", "The Struggle Continues", and "Fort Europa", all of which Vladi Vargas has been credited for. Looptroop Rockers is also Sweden's biggest hiphop export. Vladi Vargas mixed the song "The Prayer" on the debut album "Stand by for" by Eurovision Song Contest winner Måns Zelmerlöw, which reached number one in Sweden and is a IFPI certified platinum album. Other records that Vladi Vargas have credits for includes those of artists Bombay Vikings, Buju Banton, Junior Kelly, Lady Saw, and Promoe.
