= Good Things (Looptroop Rockers album) =

Studio album by Looptroop Rockers
- Released: 23 April 2008
- Recorded: At Wax Cabinet Studio in Sweden
- Genre: Hip hop
- Length: 49:47
- Label: Bad Taste Records
- Producer: Embee

Looptroop Rockers chronology
Fort Europa (2005)	Good Things (2008)	Professional Dreamers (2011)

Singles from Good Things
- 1. "The Building" Released: 2008; 2. "Naïve" Released: 2008

Good Things is the fourth album by the Swedish hip hop group Looptroop Rockers. It was released in 2008 by Bad Taste Records and is entirely produced by Embee. It is the first album released after the retirement of band member CosM.I.C. and also the first one released under the name Looptroop Rockers. Despite leaving the group, CosM.I.C. does make an appearance on the track Al Mazika. Good Things also features the first cover song on any of the group's albums, Livin' on a Prayer, originally performed by Bon Jovi.

== Track listing ==
1. "Family First"
2. "The Building"
3. "Marinate"
4. "Stains" (ft. Mapei)
5. "Living on a Prayer"
6. "Rome"
7. "Ginger & Lemon"
8. "Naïve" (ft. Timbuktu)
9. "Al Mazika" (ft. Alibi, CosM.I.C.)
10. "Blood & Urine"
11. "Trance Fat" (ft. Rakaa Iriscience)
12. "The Busyness"
13. "Puzzle"
