= T2: Kontrakultur =

T2: KontraKultur

Studio album by Timbuktu
- Released: 2000/2001
- Genre: Hip hop
- Length: 98:18

Timbuktu chronology
T2: KontraKultur (2000)	W.D.M.D. (2002)

T2: Kontrakultur is the debut studio album by Swedish hip hop artist Timbuktu. In 2001, a new version of the album was released, containing only the Swedish songs plus a few bonus songs.

== Track listing ==
=== Disc 1 ===
#	Title	Time	Songwriters	Performer(s)
1	Intro	1:05	Måns Asplund; Mårten Sakwanda	Timbuktu
2	Mvh	4:07	Måns Asplund; Mårten Sakwanda	Timbuktu
3	På ettan	2:05	Måns Asplund; Mårten Sakwanda	Timbuktu
4	Mikrofonterapi	4:18	Måns Asplund; Mårten Sakwanda	Timbuktu
5	Det räcker	3:57	Måns Asplund; Mårten Sakwanda	Timbuktu
6	Sedlighetsroteln	3:30	Måns Asplund; Mårten Sakwanda	Timbuktu; Looptroop
7	T2	4:39	Måns Asplund; Mårten Sakwanda	Timbuktu
8	Pendelparanoia	3:45	Måns Asplund; Mårten Sakwanda	Timbuktu
9	Sydkraft	4:47	Måns Asplund; Mårten Sakwanda	Timbuktu; Spotrunnaz
10	100 000 Headz	4:34	Måns Asplund; Mårten Sakwanda	Timbuktu
11	T.L.O.V.E. [Not in re-release]	3:27	Måns Asplund; Mårten Sakwanda	Timbuktu
12	VI E	3:55	Måns Asplund; Mårten Sakwanda	Timbuktu; Blues
13	Serieskandalen	3:39	Måns Asplund; Mårten Sakwanda	Timbuktu

13	Pendelparanoia (Remix) [Only in re-release]	Timbuktu
14	Sen kväll med Schlook [Only in re-release]	Timbuktu
15	Ring Snuten! [Only in re-release]	Timbuktu

=== Disc 2 ===
#	Title	Time	Songwriters	Performer(s)
1	Intro	1:06	Måns Asplund; Mårten Sakwanda	Timbuktu; Swing
2	Independent Moves	4:06	Måns Asplund; Mårten Sakwanda	Timbuktu
3	Rap	3:10	Måns Asplund; Mårten Sakwanda	Timbuktu
4	Careers	4:33	Måns Asplund; Mårten Sakwanda	Timbuktu
5	Absorb This	4:22	Måns Asplund; Mårten Sakwanda	Timbuktu; DJ Noize
6	Northface	4:08	Måns Asplund; Mårten Sakwanda	Timbuktu
7	Reach	3:16	Måns Asplund; Mårten Sakwanda	Timbuktu
8	All the Wrong Reasons	4:03	Måns Asplund; Mårten Sakwanda	Timbuktu
9	Boilin Hot	5:07	Måns Asplund; Mårten Sakwanda	Timbuktu; Swing; Spotrunnaz
10	We Gotta	4:18	Måns Asplund; Mårten Sakwanda	Timbuktu
11	The Ridiculous	4:00	Måns Asplund; Mårten Sakwanda	Timbuktu
12	Can I Breath	4:03	Måns Asplund; Mårten Sakwanda	Timbuktu
13	Servin' Portions	4:23	Måns Asplund; Mårten Sakwanda	Timbuktu

== Charts ==
Chart (2000)	Peak position
Sweden (Sverigetopplistan)	56
