= Celina Jaitly =

Indian former actress and model (born 1981)

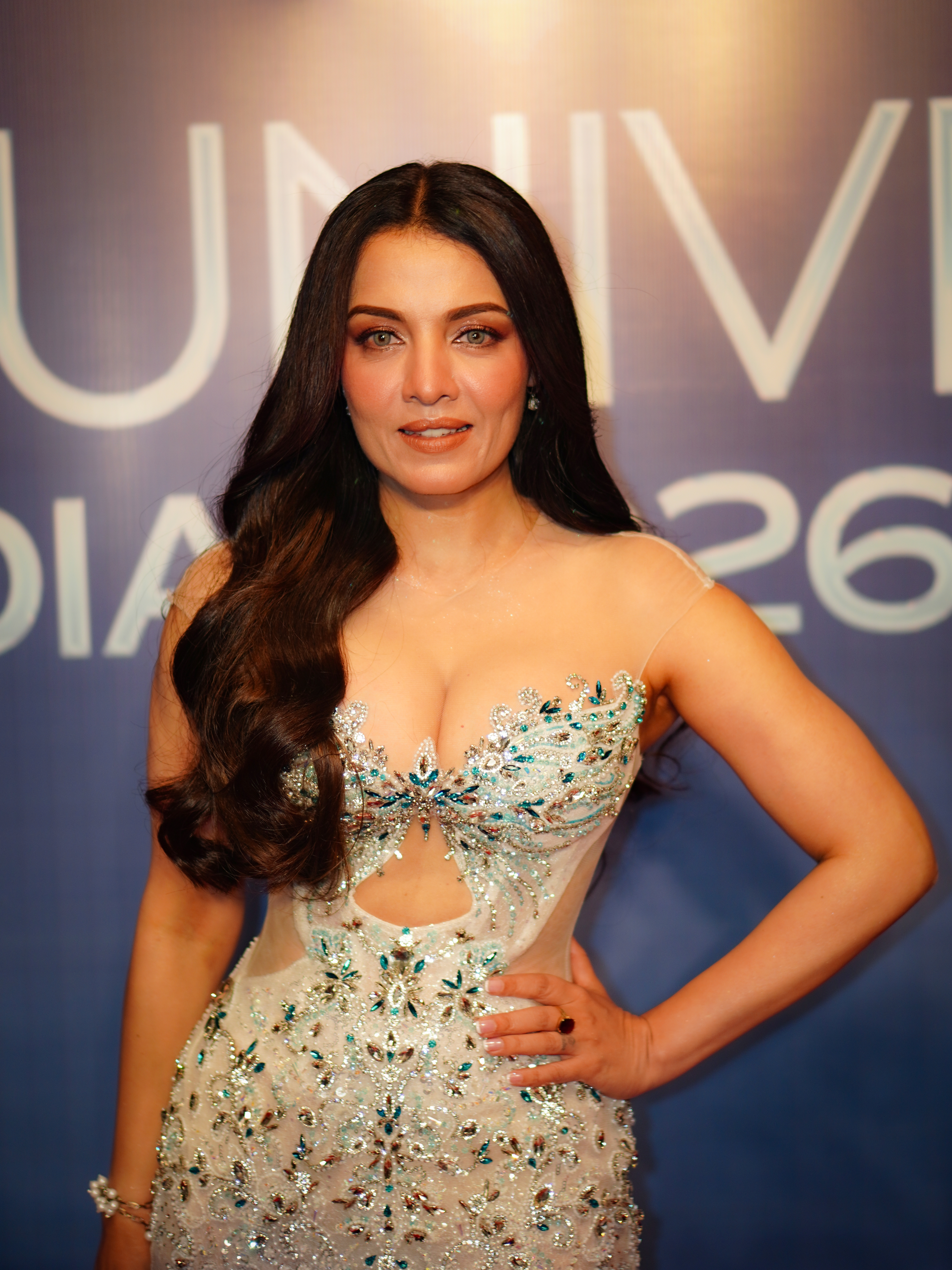
- Celina Jaitly at Miss Universe India 2026
- Born: 24 November 1981 (age 44); Shimla, Himachal Pradesh, India
- Education: Indira Gandhi National Open University
- Occupations: Actress; model
- Spouse: Peter Haag (m. 2011; sep. 2025)
- Children: 4 (1 deceased)
- Beauty pageant titleholder
- Title: Femina Miss India 2001
- Years active: 2001–2020
- Major competitions: Femina Miss India 2001 (Winner); Miss Universe 2001 (4th Runner-Up)

Celina Jaitly (born 24 November 1981) is an Indian beauty pageant titleholder and former actress. She mainly worked in Hindi cinema. She won the title of Femina Miss India 2001 and became 4th runner-up at Miss Universe 2001. She made her acting debut with the 2003 thriller Janasheen. Her notable roles include No Entry (2005), Apna Sapna Money Money (2006), Golmaal Returns (2008), and Thank You (2011), of which the former three were box office successes.

== Early life ==
Jaitly was born in Shimla, Himachal Pradesh, India to a Punjabi Hindu father, Colonel Vikram Kumar Jaitly and a Christian mother, Meeta Francis who was a professor of psychology and literature. Her maternal grandfather, Colonel Eric Francis served in the Rajputana Rifles of the Indian Army. Her maternal grandmother Usha belonged to a Punjabi Christian family, and also was a second-generation Afghan-Indian through her Afghan Hindu grandmother.

She wanted to grow up and join the army just like her father, either as a pilot or a doctor. Most of her childhood was spent in different locations due to her father being transferred in cities and towns all over India – as a result she ended up studying in over a dozen different schools. She attended City Montessori School, Station Road, Lucknow and Canossa Convent School, Ranikhet while her family was in respective cities. She graduated with a degree in Commerce with Accountancy (Hons.) from IGNOU (Khallikote College study centre) while her stay in Brahmapur, Odisha. Her mother taught in the DePaul School there. After graduation, Jaitly worked in a cell phone company in Kolkata, West Bengal briefly as a marketing executive. The family is now settled in Mhow.

== Career ==
=== 2001–04: Debut and setback ===
Jaitly started her career with a marketing job in a mobile phone company in Kolkata before she decided to participate in a local beauty contest. She won the title at Femina Miss India 2001. She also won the Miss Margo Beautiful Skin, Indiatimes Surfer's Choice, and MTV's Most Wanted award. She was subsequently sent to the Miss Universe 2001 contest representing India where she finished 4th runner-up.

In 2001, she featured in Jazzy B's music video of "Oh Kehri", which was immensely popular. She also featured in music videos for Bombay Vikings.

In 2003, she made her film debut in Feroz Khan's Janasheen. The movie was a moderate box office success in India. For her second release, she had a starring role opposite Sunny Deol in the romantic action Khel, but the feature was poorly received and earned little at the box office.

In 2004, Jaitly turned down the lead role in Julie. In an interview with Stardust, Jaitly commented: "I turned down Julie because I didn't agree with the reasoning of the protagonist in the story, who resorts to prostitution because her man ditches her. I didn't see why any educated girl would take such a drastic step. I take up roles that I mentally agree with, and this was not such a role". The same years Celina appeared in the Telugu drama Suryam opposite Vishnu Manchu.

=== 2005–08: Professional expansion ===
By 2005, under the direction of Khalid Mohamed, Jaitly played the role of Preeti, an air hostess, in Silsiilay. The movie was well received by critics. Rediff.com reported that "Celina Jaitly sizzles in the song Belibaas". She next portrayed the character of Sanjana in No Entry, the film was received favourably by critics and became successful at the box office with gross earnings of ₹840.9 million (US$8.7 million).

The following year, Jaitly co-starred in Deepak Tijori's comedy Tom, Dick, and Harry. The film became successful at the box office with gross earnings of ₹250.7 million (US$2.6 million). She next appeared in Apna Sapna Money Money, directed by Sangeeth. It received mixed reviews, though it became a financial success, with a domestic total of ₹390.4 million (US$4.1 million). In 2006, Jaitly appeared in the music video for the Indian hit song "Zara Nazron Se Kehdo" performed by Bombay Vikings with Swedish music producers Soundism behind the studio work.

In 2007, Jaitly starred in Red: The Dark Side, directed by Vikram Bhatt, alongside Aftab Shivdasani. Her final release of 2007 was Suneel Darshan's comedy Shakalaka Boom Boom, with Bobby Deol, Upen Patel and Kangana Ranaut. Upon release it did moderately well at the box office but was critically panned.

In 2008, she took a supporting role in Golmaal Returns. It received mixed reviews, though it became a financial success, with a domestic total of ₹660.9 million (US$6.9 million). Jaitly's performance was applauded, with critic Taran Adarsh writing: "Celina stays on your mind even after the show is over".

=== Recent works (2009–present) ===
During 2009 and 2010, all three films in which she starred; Paying Guests, Accident on Hill Road and Hello Darling, were critically and commercially unsuccessful.

In 2011, Jaitly had two leading roles. Her first was Anees Bazmee's Thank You, a romantic comedy. The film was poorly received by critics but became a commercial success, earning over ₹950.6 million (US$9.9 million). She next appeared in Shrimathi, a Kannada film directed by Ravi Kumar. It proved a commercial success.

There were reports in 2011 that Jaitly was slated to play a Persian princess in the film Quest of Scheherezade with actors Sean Connery and Orlando Bloom, and directed by Ken Khan.

== Personal life ==
Celina Jaitly is married to Austrian entrepreneur and hotelier Peter Haag. They became parents to twin boys born in March 2012. Jaitly gave birth to a second set of twin boys in 2017, one of whom died due to a heart defect.

Jaitly's brother Major (Retd.) Vikrant Jaitly, a retired Indian Army officer, was detained in the United Arab Emirates in connection with an alleged matter of national security in September 2024. This prompted Jaitly to approach the Delhi High Court resulting in the court, in November 2025, directing the Indian Ministry of External Affairs to extend legal assistance to Jaitly's brother.

In November 2025, Jaitly filed a case under the Domestic Violence Act, in a Mumbai court alleging domestic violence from her husband. Jaitly has reportedly made a claim of ₹50 crore (US$5,558,920) towards the damages, ₹10 lakh (US$11,118) per month towards maintenance and custody of their children. The damages claimed are towards the loss of her income, damage to her properties and impact of the abuse which she alleged to be emotional, physical, sexual and verbal in nature.

== Philanthropy ==
Jaitly is a supporter of the rights and equality of the LGBTQ community and supports the gay rights movement in India. She has also been involved in activities concerning human rights and women's rights.

Jaitly was a proponent of the abolition of Section 377 of the Indian Penal Code (IPC), which criminalized homosexuality in India until the 2018 ruling of the Supreme Court of India. In 2014, Jaitly made her singing debut in a music video on gay rights. The video titled "The Welcome" was launched by the UN in April 2014 as a campaign against homophobia.

== Media image ==
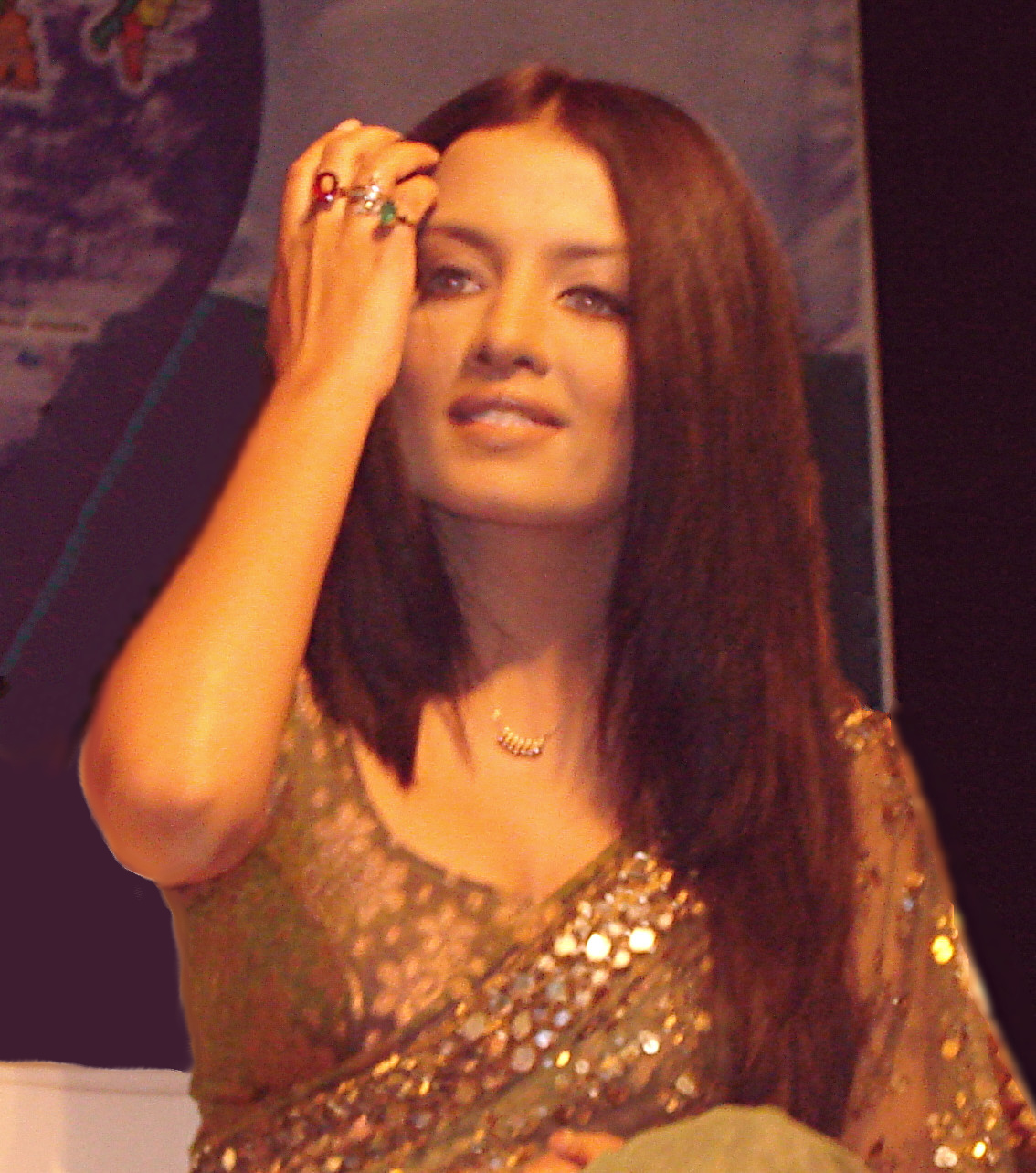
Jaitly in 2008

In the Times Most Desirable Women list, Jaitly was placed 18th in 2009 and 48th in 2010. Jaitly has been a celebrity endorser for several brands such as Sepang Circuit Malaysia 2002, Ayur (ayurvedic hair shampoos) 2002–2004, Ponds (Dreamflower talc) 2001–2004, Margo (skin soap) 2001–2003, Gitanjali (diamond jewels) 2003–present, Jashn (Leading Indian apparels) 2006–present, Proactv (International skin solutions) 2008–present, RICHFEEL (trichology clinics) 2012–present, 18 Again (women's intimate care) 2012–present, PETA 2005–present, United Nations Equality Champions 2013–present.

== Filmography ==
=== Films ===
Year	Title	Role	Notes	Ref.
2003	Janasheen	Jessica Pereira		
2003	Khel – No Ordinary Game	Saanjh Batra		
2004	Suryam	Madhulatha "Madhu"	Telugu film	
2005	Silsiilay	Preeti		
2005	No Entry	Sanjana Saxena		
2006	Jawani Diwani: A Youthful Joyride	Roma Fernandes		
2006	Zinda	Nisha Roy		
2006	Tom, Dick, and Harry	Celina		
2006	Apna Sapna Money Money	Sania Badnaam		
2007	Red: The Dark Side	Anahita Saxena		
2007	Shakalaka Boom Boom	Sheena		
2007	Heyy Babyy	Herself	Special appearance in song "Heyy Babyy"	
2008	C Kkompany	Herself	Special appearance in song "Speaker Baje"	
2008	Money Hai Toh Honey Hai	Shruti Badola		
2008	Golmaal Returns	Meera Iyer		
2009	Paying Guests	Kalpana Singh		
2009	Accident on Hill Road	Sonam Chopra		
2010	Hello Darling	Candy D'Souza		
2011	Thank You	Maya Mathur		
2011	Shrimathi	Sonia Roy	Kannada film	
2012	Will You Marry Me?	Vaishali Kapoor	Special appearance	
2020	Season's Greetings	Romita	Short film	

Awards and achievements
Preceded by (United States) Lynnette Cole	Miss Universe 4th Runner Up; 2001	Succeeded by (Venezuela) Cynthia Lander
Preceded by Lara Dutta	Miss India Universe; 2001	Succeeded by Neha Dhupia
