= Fort Europa =

Studio album by Looptroop
- Released: 2005
- Recorded: At Wax Cabinet Studio in Sweden
- Genre: Hip hop
- Length: 58:25
- Labels: David Vs Goliath; Burning Heart Records
- Producer: Embee

Looptroop chronology
The Struggle Continues (2002)	Fort Europa (2005)	Good Things (2008)

Singles from Fort Europa
- 1. "Fort Europa" Released: 2005; 2. "Chana Masala" Released: 2005

Fort Europa is the third album by the Swedish hip hop group Looptroop. It was released in 2005 by Burning Heart Records and is entirely produced by Embee. An instrumental version of the album has also been released.

Professional ratings
Review scores
Source	Rating
rapreviews.com	link

== Track listing ==
1. Dm-87 - 1:16
2. Fort Europa - 4:13
3. 21 Grams - 4:25
4. Chana Masala - 4:04
5. Trinfidelity - 2:31
6. Night Train - 5:09
7. 21 Bars - 1:02
8. Rainbow Faces - 4:12
9. Hurricane George feat. Timbuktu & Chords - 4:00
10. Trinsanity - 1:57
11. Sparkplug - 3:06
12. Trrism - 4:39
13. Carneval - 4:29
14. Heavy Rains - 5:52
15. Trincest - 2:04
16. Unilateral Communication - 5:31
