= Eastern Sunz =

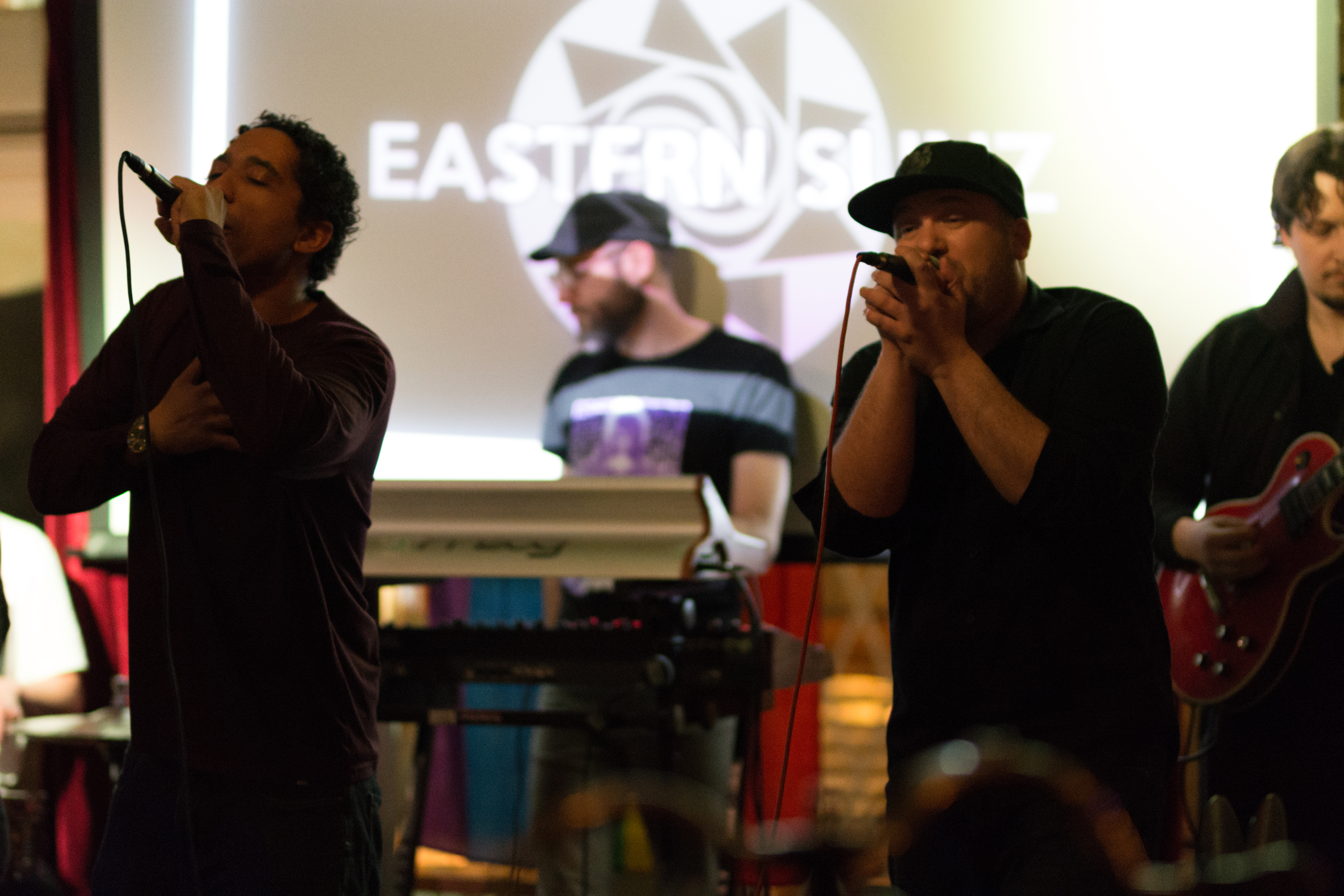
- Eastern Sunz performing in 2020

Background information
- Origin: Portland, Oregon
- Genres: Rap, hip hop
- Label: Independent
- Members: Courage, TravisT
- Website: EasternSunz.com

Eastern Sunz is a hip hop duo from Portland, Oregon, known for "intellectual hip hop" that often focuses on political, social, and environmental issues. They have released a number of albums, and in 2012 won the John Lennon Songwriting Contest and International Songwriting Contest for lyrics on their EP Filthy Hippie Music. Their fifth album Corroded Utopia features Promoe (Looptroop Rockers) and Smoke (Old Dominion).

== Members ==
Current

- Aaron "Courage" Harris - MC
- Travis "TravisT" Taylor - MC, DJ

== Discography ==
=== Albums ===
Partial list of albums by Eastern Sunz
| Year | Album title | Release details |
|---|---|---|
| 2007 | Nine Triangles | Released: August 29, 2007; Label: self-released; Format: CD, digital |
| 2010 | Corroded Utopia | Released: June 1, 2010; Label: self-released; Format: CD, digital |
| 2012 | Filthy Hippie Music | Released: March 23, 2012; Label: self-released; Format: CD, digital |
| 2014 | Placebos for the People | Released: September 9, 2014; Label: self-released; Format: CD, digital |
| 2020 | Fuel for a Fool's Errand | Released: June 26, 2020; Label: self-released; Format: CD, digital |

== Awards and nominations ==
| Year | Award | Nominated work | Category | Result |
|---|---|---|---|---|
| 2010 | The Independent Music Awards | Eastern Sunz, Corroded Utopia | Rap/Hip Hop Album of the Year | Won |
| 2012 | John Lennon Songwriting Contest | Eastern Sunz, Filthy Hippie Music | Best Rap Song | Won |
| 2012 | Eco Arts Awards | Eastern Sunz, Filthy Hippie Music | Grand Prize | Won |
| 2020 | International Songwriting Competition | Eastern Sunz, Not Enough | Rap/Hip Hop | Nominated |
| 2020 | The Independent Music Awards | Eastern Sunz, Fuel for a Fool's Errand | Rap/Hip Hop Album of the Year | Nominated |
