= The Struggle Continues =

The Struggle Continues may refer to:

- The Struggle Continues (Looptroop album), 2002
- The Struggle Continues (Dewey Redman album), 1982
- The Struggle Continues (Link 80 album), 2000
- The Struggle Continues (Yung Child Support album), 2017

== See also ==
- Lotta Continua
