= Stylez =

Stylez may refer to:

- Million Stylez (born 1981), Swedish dancehall artist
- Mystic Stylez, 1995 album by Three 6 Mafia
- Stylez G. White (born 1979), American football defensive end
