= Nordic Steel =

Swedish record label

- Founded: 27/08/2006
- Founder: Spitfiyah, Iman Russ, Jatrix
- Status: 2006 - Active
- Genre: Reggae, Hip Hop, R&B, Dancehall,
- Country of origin: Sweden
- Location: Sollentuna, Stockholm
- Official website: http://www.nordicsteel.se

Nordic Steel Entertainment is a Swedish-based record label founded in 2006 by Spitfiyah, Iman Russ and Jatrix.

== Music produced by Nordic Steel ==
Artist	Album	Notes
Advance	Game Over	
Rebellious	Earth & Heaven	
Lutan Fyah	Dip Him	
Perfect	Nothing Scares Me	
Million Stylez ft Jah Knight	Bun a Badmind	
Advance, Cali P, Richie Riott, Cheluz, Jahknight, Essay, Mazaya, Spitfiyah & Jahknight	Ghetto Flexx Riddim	
Essay	Nothing 2 Something	
Iman Russ	The Voice of the Future, People’s Truth (Double Album)	
