= Oberoendeframkallande =

Studio album by Timbuktu
- Released: 2007
- Recorded: 2007
- Genre: Rap
- Label: JuJu Records
- Producer: Breakmecanix

Oberoendeframkallande is the fifth studio album by Swedish rapper Timbuktu. The album, produced by Breakmecanix, was released as both a vinyl and compact disc, with both releases having slightly different track listings.

== Track listing ==
#	Title	Featured guest(s)	Time
1	"Pretjafs"		3:05
2	"Låt Nr. 92"		4:26
3	"Lasternas"	Dungen	3:39
4	"Karmakontot"		4:49
5	"Bra, Bra"	Chords	3:31
6	"En Vecka Med"		0:57
7	"Ett Halvår Utan"	Tingsek	4:30
8	"Lika Barn Avvika Bäst (Del. 2)"		4:13
9	"Kejsaren Är Naken"		4:35
10	"Vibb Aktuellt"		4:01
11	"Ufokuken"		3:00
12	"Fantasi"		3:31
13	"Med Eller Mot"		4:17
14	"WWW.Stoppamej.Nu"		0:04
15	"Känn Pepp (Obfk)"		5:28

== Charts ==
=== Weekly charts ===
Chart (2007)	Peak position
Sweden (Sverigetopplistan)	1

=== Year-end charts ===
Chart (2007)	Position
Swedish Albums (Sverigetopplistan)	31
