= Million Stylez =

Swedish dancehall musician (born 1981)

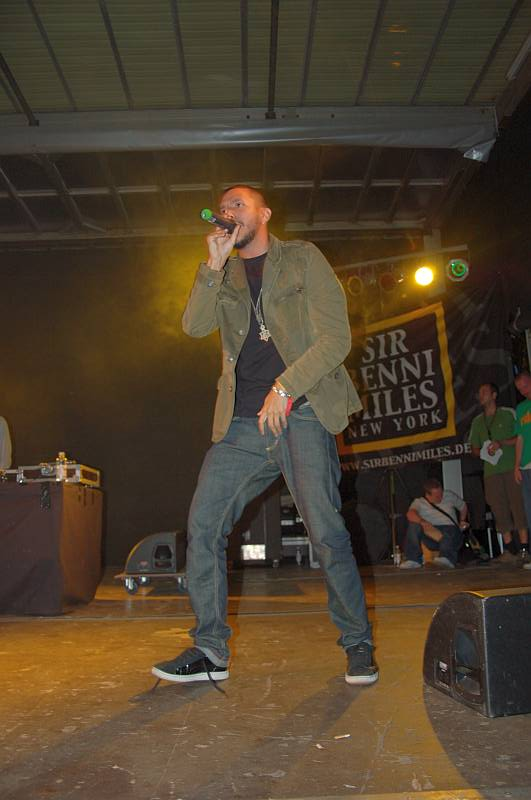
Million Stylez

Kenshin Iryo (born June 1, 1981), better known by his stage name Million Stylez, is a Swedish dancehall artist.

Kenshin Iryo was born on June 1, 1981, in Stockholm, Sweden. He grew up in the Stockholm suburb of Sollentuna, and has been living there for 26 years. He is half Japanese and half French and grew up mainly with people from around the world, which contributed to his respect for other cultures. Stylez started experimenting with hip hop at the young age of nine, writing and recording rap tunes in Swedish on his cassette-player.

Million Stylez (featuring Famous and Michael Knight) released the song Without U in 2004, mixed by Soundism's Vladi Vargas. In the summer of 2005, Stylez reached the finals in Big Break arranged by Irie FM and Red Stripe. It is an annual talent competition for up-and-coming artists in Jamaica with more than 1,200 talented applicants. After live shows (in St. Elizabeth, Montego Bay and Kingston), TV and radio-interviews he ended up winning fourth place. He was also the only non-Jamaican that ever had participated in the competition until the year after when Natasha (Denmark) won first place.

On March 1, 2006, he released his first single "Miss Fatty" through German distributor Soundquake, and was their number one selling song for several weeks. "Miss Fatty" was also received very well by radio stations like Hot97, Shade 45 (Eminem's satellite radio), BBC1Xtra, Kiss FM, NRJ, Voice etc. It has also been the number one track on Trace TV/radio that broadcasts to over 50 countries around the world. The video was shot in Cuba (Santiago de Cuba) and has over 47.000.000 views on YouTube so far and has become his signature song.

Million Stylez released his debut album From A Far (2007) on KBC Music and includes musical genres ranging from reggae, dancehall and hip hop to some R&B influenced songs, as well as a crunkhall remix of a hidden track (produced by Nordic Steel). Most of the tunes contain conscious lyrics about his gratitude to God, life struggles, celebration, love and hate, war and peace and other issues.

Stylez has worked with many musical acts including Beyoncé, Loon, Smif N Wessun, Mr. Vegas, Bunji Garlin, Lukie D, Loogaman, Alozade, J-Ro, Gentleman, and two of Sweden's biggest and most respected rappers, Promoe and Ken Ring. He has also been the opening act for artists like Sean Paul, Beenie Man, Elephant Man, Ne-Yo, Fabolous, Nina Sky, Ryan Leslie, Fatman Scoop, Wayne Wonder, Mr. Vegas, T.O.K., Anthony B, Ward 21, Alozade, Zumjay, among others. He has recorded dubplates for big soundsystems and selectors like David Rodigan (the U.K.'s biggest and most known selector), Mighty Crown, Massive B, Sentinel, Robbo Ranx and Silver Star.

Stylez has toured internationally to promote his most recent album Everyday with musical guests including Busy Signal, Gentleman, and Don Carlos.

== Discography ==
=== Albums ===
Album details	Peak positions
Album details	SWE
From A Far: Released: 2007; Record label: KBC Music	–
Everyday: Released: 2010; Record label: Adonai Music	58

=== Singles ===
Charting

Year	Single	Peak positions	Album
Year	Single	SWE	Album
2007	"Miss Fatty"	27	From A Far

Others

- "Without U" (single, KBC Music)
- "All Night" (single, KBC Music)
- "Give Me The Strength" (single, KBC Music)
- "This Is Da Style" (single)
- "Miss Fatty" (single, Mumpy Ride)
- "Ya habibti" (Music produced By Maxime Emixam Sene)
- "Revelation Time" featuring Lutan Fyah (Way Back Riddim, Dub Akom Records)

Featured in

Year	Single	Peak positions	Album
Year	Single	SWE	Album
2007	"Själen av en vän" (Ken Ring feat. Million Stylez)	23	

== See also ==
- Swedish hip hop
- Papa Dee
- Soundism
