= Soundism =

Team of music producers

- Origin: Västerås, Sweden
- Genres: Hip hop, R&B, reggae fusion
- Occupations: Producers, arrangers, songwriters
- Instruments: Guitar, keyboards, sequencer, sampler, saxophone, snare drum, synthesizers, trumpet
- Years active: 1988-present
- Members: Embee, Jimmy Ledrac, Mats Nyman, Vladi Vargas
- Website: www.soundism.com

Soundism is a group of music producers and sound engineers with music recording studios located in Stockholm, Gothenburg and Västerås in Sweden. They are part of the Swedish hip hop culture. Not only have new artists emerged, but also other actors in the hip hop culture that are less visible to the general public. Soundism has been one of the supporters of hip hop artists in Sweden, which meant that they could put forward recordings to the international scene. Growing out creating music of prerecorded music on vinyl records with the Dj style Turntablism, Soundism understood what sound that was required for hip hop records. Previous music producers and studios in Sweden mainly focused on pop or rock music. Hip hop music has origins in reggae music, which partially explains Soundism's work within both of these genres.

In 2001, Papa Dee got his reggae song Hottie Hottie Girls featuring Lady Saw remixed by Soundism. The graffiti themed Promoe song These Walls Don't Lie, recorded and mixed by Soundism, took the charts across Europe in 2004. Soundism mixed producer Embee's Tellings from Solitaria, which was rewarded with a Grammis in 2004 as Best HipHop/Soul of the Year. The album included the single Send Someone Away featuring José Gonsález. Junior Kelly's Rasta Should be Deeper, mixed my Soundism, was voted one of the top 10 best songs of all popular music genres in 2005 by 20 radio producers and staff at Swedish National Public Radio P3. YT was given urban music award UK Reggae Artist of the Year 2006, Soundism contributed to the sound of his Real Life song.

While hip hop and reggae are the most common genres for Soundism's music productions, they have also produced Bombay Vikings' Zara Nazron Se Kehdo, which made it to the top three position on the Indian music chart in 2006. The song is a soundtrack of the Indian movie Munijimi. Soundism has also done recordings and music production for the song Shart, a soundtrack of the Bollywood movie Milan Talkies that premiered in 2019.

Looptroop Rockers was inducted to Swedish Music Hall of Fame in 2017 and most of the mentioned albums and songs in the jury's motivation and band presentation have been recorded or mixed by Soundism's Vladi Vargas. Looptroop Rockers is also Sweden's biggest hiphop export ever.

== Members ==
Soundism is a team of people rather than one person. Vladi Vargas in probably the leading member of Soundism, others have appeared more intermittently on credits for various projects.

== Discography ==
Releases with Soundism credited for production, mixing, or mastering. (Years indicate release date, not year of production).

- Bombay Vikings Zara Nazron Se Kehdo (2006)
- Embee Telings from Solitaria (2004)
- Embee Send Someone Away, featuring José González (2005)
- Jah Mason Mi Chalwa (2005)
- Junior Kelly Rasta Should be Deeper (2005)
- Papa Dee featuring Lady Saw Hottie Hottie (2001)
- Looptroop Fort Europa (2005)
- Looptroop Long Arm of the Law
- Looptroop Struggle Continues (2002)
- Looptroop Rockers Good Things (2008)
- Million Stylez Without U (2004)
- Måns Zelmerlöw The Prayer (2007)
- Promoe Long Distance Runner (2004)
- Promoe These Walls Don't Lie (2004)
- Promoe White Man's Burden (2006)
- Sonu Nigam Shart (2019)
- YT Real Life (2006)
