= Svennebanan =

Single by Promoe

from the album Kråksången
- Released: 2009
- Label: Pope, David vs. Goliath

"Svennebanan" is a single by Swedish rapper Promoe, which was released in 2009. The song has peaked at number 1 on the Swedish singles chart.

== Reception ==
Editor from Arbetarbladet described "Svennebanan" as a strange euro song and said that someone might think Promoe is some kind of Basshunter with dreadlocks.

== Music video ==
Music video was directed by Kamisol.

== Track listing ==
CD Single
No.	Title	Length
1.	"Svennebanan"

Promo single
No.	Title	Length
1.	"Svennebanan (Radio Edit)"	2:42
2.	"Svennebanan (Remady P & R Remix)"	5:21
3.	"Svennebanan (Havin Zagross & Mickey Mic Remix)"	6:56
4.	"Svennebanan (Trone Edit)"	7:53
5.	"Svennebanan (Sam-E Allyawan Organismen Remix)"	2:17
6.	"Skäggig Vegan (Remix)"	1:13

== Charts ==
=== Weekly charts ===
Chart (2009)	Peak position
Denmark (Tracklisten)	4
Finland (Suomen virallinen lista)	11
Sweden (Sverigetopplistan)	1

=== Year-end charts ===
Chart (2009)	Position
Sweden (Sverigetopplistan)	15
