= Damn (band) =

Damn!
- Origin: Lund, Sweden
- Genres: Latin; Funk; Afro-beat
- Years active: 1995–present
- Labels: Lund Records; Pope Records; Raw Fusion Recordings; LoveCat Music
- Members: Svante Lodén; Måns Mernsten; Måns Block; Erik Hjärpe; Gustav Lindroth; Sven Andersson; Petter Lindgård; Jens Lindgård
- Website: Official site

Damn! is a Swedish funk-rock band based in Lund that has released five albums since 1999. The four core members are joined on stage and on record by a collective of DJs and live musicians. They are also videographers and direct their own videos. The band has toured Japan, Europe and North America.

Additionally, Damn! has recorded and toured as the backup band for Swedish rapper Timbuktu since 2002. In 2021-22 the band played live music on stage in a production of the musical Cabaret on the Swedish national stage in Stockholm, the Royal Dramatic Theatre.

== Discography ==
=== Albums ===
- Natural Sounds 1999
- Youth Style 2004
- Let's Zoom In 2008
- The Unlocked Door 2009
- Full Ära 2012

=== Compilations ===
- Bossa Brava! Volume 3 1998
- The Very Best of Bossa Brava 2002
- Latin Moderns Volume 1 2003
- Latin Moderns Volume 2 2006
- Latin Moderns Volume 3 2008
- Lund Calling 2003
