= Madubuko Diakité =

American human rights lawyer (born 1940)

Madubuko Arthur Robinson Diakité
- Born: 17 December 1940 (age 85); New York City, N.Y, .USA
- Education: Hunter College; La Salle Extension University, LL.B; Stockholm University, fil.kand, M.A. Lund University, LL.M, Research Degree: Jurist Licentiate, 2007.
- Occupations: Film-maker, lawyer
- Relatives: Timbuktu (son)

Madubuko A. Robinson Diakité (born 17 December 1940) is a US-born human rights lawyer and documentary filmmaker currently residing in Sweden. He has traveled widely throughout Africa and currently freelances as a guest lecturer and consultant on African migration, the African diaspora, human rights law, film history, mass media. He attended the UN's World Conference Against Racism in Durban, 2001, where he was part of the Migrant Worker Caucus.

== Early life ==
Diakité was born in New York City 1940. Following his parents' divorce, his mother married a journalist from Nigeria, and he and his three siblings spent most of their teenage years there. Encouraged by his stepfather's important role in the struggle for independence from Britain, Diakité developed his own interests in journalism and human rights. Upon returning to New York City in the 1960s, he served for two years in the US Army, then attended Hunter College, New York (No degree). In 1967 he earned a law degree at La Salle Extension University, Chicago, Illinois.

== Career ==
Inspired by Direct Cinema filmmakers whose films he saw in New York during the early 1960s, Diakité earned a diploma in documentary filmmaking at the New York Institute of Photography under George Wallach. He then went to Sweden as a foreign student in 1968 and earned a Swedish B.A. (fil.kand) and an M.A. in film at the Department of Film Studies, Stockholm University (1972-3) under the guidance of Professor Rune Waldekranz, its founder. In 1973, Diakité won an Honorable Mention prize for a film on youth in Harlem at the Grenoble Festival of Short films (For Personal Reasons, co-produced with SVT2, Malmö). After completing studies for a Ph.D. in film history (ABD) at Stockholm University he published the draft of his dissertation as a book entitled A Piece of The Glory: A Survey of African American Filmmakers and Their Struggles with Popular American Myths in 1992.ISBN 91-971877-0-4 LCCN 92--73502.

Employed as a Researcher in Film at Ahmadu Bello University, Zaria, Nigeria, 1974 -1975, Diakité established the Film Unit at the Centre for Nigerian Cultural Studies, (under Professor Michael Crowder, Director).The short film produced and directed by Diakité examined village activities to support the crowning of a new Emir. (See: From Harlem to Sweden to Nigeria, YouTube, madubukodiakite.) Diakité returned to Sweden shortly after the Coronation.

In 1992, Diakité earned an LL.M. (Master of Law) at the Faculty of Law, Lund University, Sweden.

In 2007 Diakité earned a Juris licentiat degree at the Faculty of Law, Lund University, Sweden. The title of his dissertation is Managing African Migrant Workers

In 2008 he published Not Even in Your Dreams, an autobiographical work about his childhood growing up in Africa.ISBN 978-1-4251-4258-2

Besides teaching and making films, Diakité assists refugees and migrants as a Public Defender (Offentlig Biträde) in Migration Law in Sweden.

Diakité has published articles on film and human rights law for several international publications, and has headed several projects on the rights of people of African descent in Sweden. He is also the publisher of The Lundian Magazine, an English language newsletter in Sweden, the director and CEO of The English International Association of Lund, an NGO based in Lund, Sweden (founded in 1987).

Until 2024 Diakité was a Senior Researcher Emeritus at the Raoul Wallenberg Institute of Human Rights and Humanitarian Law|Raoul Wallenberg Institute in Lund, Sweden. His research at the institute focused on migration in Africa, structural discrimination and refugee migration in Sweden. He has also researched human rights and migrants workers in Africa.

== Personal life ==
Diakité lives in Malmö with his Dutch-born wife. He is the father of Swedish rapper Jason "Timbuktu" Diakité, and uncle to Nigerian American actor Chet Anekwe

=== Noted Films ===
After graduating from the New York Institute of Photography Diakite produced, directed and edited the following 16mm films:

- Dreams of G, a short film co produced with the late Boris Bodé about the dreams of a lonely girl in New York
- For Personal Reasons, a 35 minute film about an angry black youth in New York who sees no way out of his misery than to take vigilante actions against NYC policemen
- Det Osynliga Folket (The Invisible People, in English and Swedish), a 35 minute film about case studies of discrimination of foreign students and immigrants in Lund, co produced by Herbert Söderström and Gary Engman with a special thanks to Sveriges Television (Malmö.
- En Dag På Mårtenstorget (in Swedish), a 35 minute film about Mårtenstorget, a farmers market in Lund, Sweden

=== Noted Articles and Publications ===
- Trans-Atlantic Crossings: Madubuko Diakité and Black Radical Documentary, by Dr. Christian Rossipal, Film Quarterly, Spring 2023, Vol. 76 Number 3, pp 12 – 24.

Swedish Press, Madubuko Diakité, teacher, filmmaker, publisher of a magazine in Lund, Sweden. June 1991, Vol 63:Issue 6. www.swedishpress.com, ISSN 0839-2323 .

Basic Facts About the African Diaspora. Anthologi: Afrikansksvenska Roster (African-Swedish Voices), Andreas Stevens, editor. Notisforlag, Malmö. ISBN 978-91-976701-5-9

International skydd for asylsökande och flyktingar (International Protection for Asylum-seekers and Refugees), Anthology: omänskliga rättigheter (Andreas Stevens, editor. Notisforlag, Malmö. ISBN 978-91-976701-3-5

African American Diasporans in Sweden, The Lundian Magazine (www.thelundian.com

Film and Cultural Signification:Reconsiderng Minority and Third World Films, by Madubuko Diakité, Journal of University Film Association, Vol. XXX No. 3, Summer1978.

Awards

CinemAfricas Honorary Prize 2023 Stockholm. 20 October (Cinema Africa)

Festival International Du Film De Court Métrage De Grenoble 1973: Honorary Mention (For Personal Reasons) Prix Du Film De Combat.

Film Distributors

Modern Museum, Stockholm, Sweden. https://sis.modernamuseet.

FilmForm, Stockholm. www.filmform.com .

Commonwealth Arts Centre: Black Film Festival 1 - 13th, 1982) Independent Black American Cinema: 1920 - 1980.

Third World Newsreel, Pearl Bowser Festival Director.

The Black Filmmaker Foundation Festival of Black Independent American Cinema.

Kaleidoscope: Invandrarfilm I Sverige: En katalog över filmer av och om invandrare i Sverige.(Immigrant Films in Sweden: A Catalogue of films by and about immigrants in Sweden.

Special Viewings

1973 - 74: Swedish TV 2, Malmö, Sweden.

1973 - Grenoble Festival of Short Films, Grenoble, France.

1976 - 1987 - Worldwide Distributions in Lund, Malmö, Stockholm, New York' Thalia Theatre.

2022-05-30 Cinema Pandora, Malmö.

2022-09-16 Klarabiografen i Kulturhuset, Stockholm, Sweden. Viewing arranged by Filmögon and Filmform, Stockholm.

2023-06-12 Maysles Documentary Center, Harlem, N.Y.

2024-11-05 Black Archives Sweden. www.blackarchivessweeden.com
