= Bombay Vikings =

Indian-Swedish pop group

- Origin: Stockholm, Sweden
- Genres: Pop, filmi
- Years active: 1994–2011
- Labels: Universal; T-Series
- Members: Neeraj Shridhar; Oscar Söderberg; Mats Nordenborg; Mats Folke; Johan Folke

Bombay Vikings are a pop group that combine Indian pop and classical music, formed in 1994 in Stockholm, Sweden. The band was started by Neeraj Shridhar, Oscar Söderberg, and Mats Nordenborg, and became popular with remixes of old Bollywood hits such as "Kya Soorat Hai", "Woh Chali" and "Chod Do Anchal".

The group was popular both in the Indian subcontinent and overseas among the Indian music community, due to its unusual combination of classic Bollywood style and European experimentation. It was the first group to sing in Hinglish, a mix of Hindi and English, a brainchild of its front-man, Neeraj Shridhar.

== History ==
=== Formation ===
Bombay Vikings were formed in 1994 in Stockholm, Sweden. The three experienced musicians met when Mats introduced Neeraj Shridhar and Oscar Söderberg to each other. The band was born primarily due to a common interest of Indian melodies from sources such as Hindi films and classical music. Neeraj became the lead vocalist and back-up guitarist, and also composed pop rock, jazz, hip-hop, soul, and reggae songs. Mats played the saxophone; as a jazz specialist, he used this knowledge while composing for the new band. Mats and Johan Folke, keyboard specialists, used their years of exposure to the different genres of music on the synthesizer. They were soon joined by Morgan on the drums, Par on the bass, and Staffan as the lead guitarist. Bombay Vikings began performing live shows in Sweden and Norway. When all the musicians got together and began jamming, they didn't know they would be coming out with a new form of music, but they wanted to do something creative for India.

The leader of Bombay Vikings, Neeraj Shridhar, is from Jalandhar in Punjab, India. He moved to Sweden when he was 13, where he developed his interest for music. He enjoyed listening to western and Indian classical songs. He formed Bombay Vikings in 1994 and performed at many places in Europe. The band mainly performed English songs with Neeraj adding an Indian influence. After a few years, most of the band members departed, but Neeraj kept the name of the band and formed another band with the remaining members.

=== Kya Soorat Hai (1999) ===
Neeraj produced his first album, Kya Soorat Hai, in 1999, after stopping the project for almost four years. Most of the Indian music companies didn't think the album would be too popular among the Indians due to its strong English and Western influence and demanded changes. Finally, Sony BMG agreed to produce the album in India without any changes. The album consisted of eight tracks, all of which were remakes of old Indian songs. Every song was recorded primarily in English, with two to three songs containing a few lines of Hindi. In spite of this, the album was a huge success in India and opened the doors for westernisation of music. The songs "Kya Soorat Hai", "Mona Re" and "Night Is So Perfect" were popular among teenagers. The video of the song "Kya Soorat Hai" starred South-Indian star Prabhu Deva's brother Raju Sundaram, and was a hit due to its hip-hop sound as well as its comical style. The song "Mona Re" was also made into a video.

=== Woh Chali (2000) ===
Soon after the success of their first album, Bombay Vikings recorded another successful album, Woh Chali, in 2000. The album contained four remakes of old songs and five original songs, in which Neeraj Shridhar, who wanted to be known as a modern music composer, attempted to silence the critics who said he simply "copy and pasted." All of the songs on this album were hits, especially "Woh Chali", "Jambola", "Angel Eyes", and "Jump Up". "Angel Eyes" was also an international success.

Singer Lata Mangeshkar was impressed with the remake of her song "Main Chali" from the film Padosan and invited Neeraj to perform at her birthday function.

Three songs of the album were made into videos: "Woh Chali", "Jambola" and "Angel Eyes".

=== Hawa Mein Udata Jaaye and Best of ===
In 2002, Bombay Vikings released another album, Hawa Mein Udati Jaaye. This album again revived old songs in a modern way, making the youth admire the beauty of the old songs. This time, Neeraj worked with guest singers Linnea Spores and Falguni Pathak to produce songs. The videos of the songs "Hawa Mein Udati Jaaye" and "Tera Mera Pyaar Sanam" became hits. In the same year, the album The Best Of Bombay Vikings was released, with a playback song of the film Rules: Pyaar Ka Superhit Formula, in which Neeraj sang "Kabhi Phool Dena" for music director Sandesh Shandilya. The song "Hawa Mein Udti Jaaye" continues to be popular among teenagers as the background for reels in Instagram and TikTok.

=== Chhodh Do Aanchal Zamana Kya Kahega and Fusion Remixes (2004) ===
In 2004, Bombay Vikings came up with Chhodh Do Aanchal Zamana Kya Kahega. The title track had the main lines sung again by Linea and was a hit along with its video, which was played on every music channel in India for almost a year. In the video of the song, many mistake a background dancer for Priyanka Chopra, but it is not her. The youthful songs "Ik Badal" and "Aa Raha Hoon Main" were "milestones", and the video of the song "Aa Raha Hoon Main" was a commercial hit. In the same year, Neeraj produced a single titled "Hum To Anything Karega", a remake of the song "Hum To Mohabbat Karega". This song with Neeraj's previous few hits, and the songs of other artists such as Falguni Pathak, were released in the album Fusion Remixes.

=== Zara Nazron Se Kehdo (2006) ===
The success of the band continued when they released their album Zara Nazron Se Kehdo. The song "Zara Nazron Se Kehdo" produced by Soundism and its video, which starred Bollywood actress Celina Jaitly, was a hit. The song "Mere Dil Ne" was made into a video. After this album, Neeraj chose to take a short break which has become an extended break. Bombay Vikings announced an album entitled U n I, released in 2011. Neeraj started working as a Bollywood playback singer in 2006, and has sung for many Bollywood films.

== Discography ==
- Kya Soorat Hai (1999)
- Woh Chali (2001)
- Hawa Mein Udati Jaaye (2002)
- The Best of Bombay Vikings (2003)
- Hum To Anything Karega: Fusion Remixes (2004)
- Chhodh Do Aanchal (2004)
- Zara Nazron Se Kehdo (2006)
- U n I (2011)
