= Embee =

Swedish hip hop DJ and producer

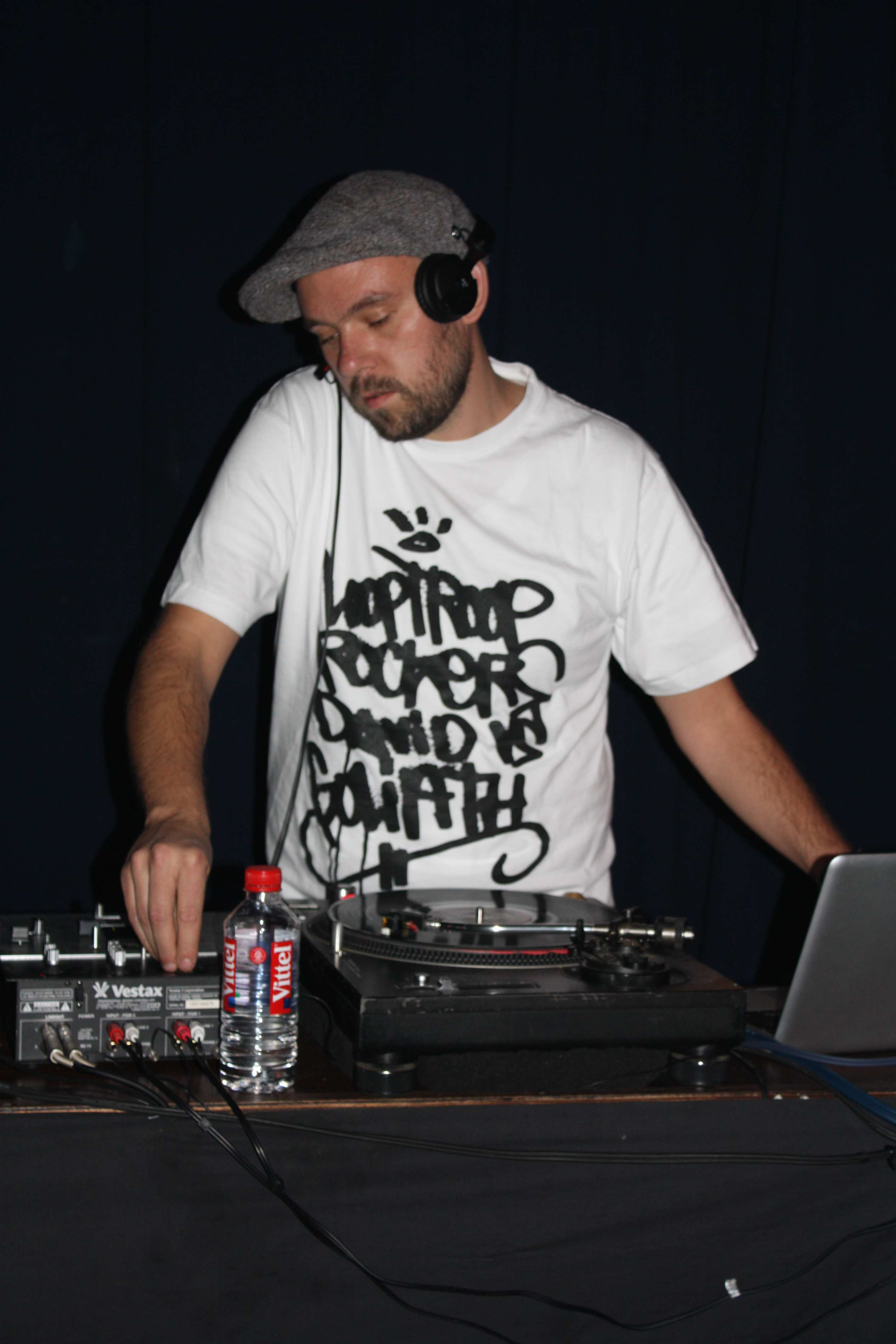
- Embee in Sendai, Japan

Background information
- Origin: Västerås, Sweden
- Genres: Hip hop, soul, jazz, electronica
- Years active: 1991–present
- Label: David vs Goliath
- Website: Official website

Embee is a Swedish hip hop DJ and producer. He was born Magnus Bergkvist on February 24, 1977, in Badelunda, Västmanland, Sweden. He is best known for his work with Swedish hip-hop group Looptroop Rockers. His first solo album Tellings from Solitaria won a Swedish Grammy Award for best hip hop or soul release of 2005.

Collaborations include Capleton, Dilated Peoples, Saïan Supa Crew, José González, Seinabo Sey, Sabina Ddumba, Jojje Wadenius to name a few.

== Recording history ==
He was born and spent his childhood in Västerås Sweden. At the age of 19, he moved to Gothenburg. He formed Looptroop in the early 1990s with Cosmic and Promoe two MCs who he had met in school. He started working with Promoe in 1991 and Cosmic joined them in 1993 to form Looptroop. Their first demo tape Superstars was released in 1993.

Embee worked in the US as a solo DJ for a year in the mid-1990s and released a number of solo singles and EPs during that time. He returned to Sweden in 1996 for the release of the second Looptroop tape Threesticksteez which featured a couple of tracks from Supreme. Supreme became a fully fledged member of the group for the From the Waxcabinet tape in 1996 (later released as a vinyl EP) named after the groups's recording studio "The Wax Cabinet".

Embee founded the David vs Goliath record company together with the other members of Looptroop 1998. Their first album on that label was Modern Day City Symphony released in 2000 both in Sweden and internationally followed by The Struggle Continues in 2002, Fort Europa in April 2005 and Good Things in 2008. Embee won successive awards at the Swedish hip hop awards as best producer for the first two albums. Embee toured throughout the world with Looptroop to promote Modern Day City Symphony including Europe, Canada, Japan, Australia and South Africa and continued to do international tours for all the following albums as well.

Embee is a member of the Casual Brothers. Embee produces the beats and Cosmic (a former member of Looptroop) raps over them. So far, they have released two EPs together (The Casual Brothers and Custumer's Choice (Part Two)), which featured Christian Kjellvander.

In 2004, Embee released the first solo album Tellings from Solitaria which featured an appearance from the other members of Looptroop and other Swedish artists such as José González, Daniel Lemma, Vanessa Liftig and Timbuktu . Recorded over a couple of years and mixed by Embee & Soundism, it was critically acclaimed and won a Swedish Grammy Award as the best hip hop/soul release in 2005. He also won the Swedish DJ awards in 2004 and 2006.

In early 2010 Embee released The Mellow Turning Moment on Bad Taste Records. Some guests include Maia Hirasawa, Nikola Šarčević of Millencollin, Hello Saferide, Mariam Wallentin of Wildbirds & Peacedrums, Fabian Kallerdahl and Erik Undéhn from The Early Days.

In November 2010 Embee released Skuggpoeten through his Wax Cabinet Productions/David vs Goliath label. The album is a collaboration with folk singer/componist Esmeralda Moberg and Embee's father, writer Roger Bergkvist.

During 2012 and 2013 Embee wrote the symphony Fair Ground together with Promoe, Cleo, Seinabo Sey and Ayla Adams. It was played at The Opera House Norrlandsoperan in Umeå with a full symphonic orchestra, conducted by Josef Rhedin, in October 2013.

On October 11, 2013, Embee released the four track EP Machine Park Jogger.

Embee was inducted into the Swedish Music Hall of Fame on March 23, 2017.

== Discography ==
Embee

- Machine Park Jogger (EP, 2013)
- The Mellow Turning Moment (album, 2010)
- Upside Down (single, 2010)
- A Day at a Time (single, 2009)
- Dom Trevande Åren (2009)
- Retty (2009)
- Barney Bilen (2007)
- Mash Hits (2006)
- Tellings From Solitaria (album, 2004)
- Send Someone Away feat. José González (Single, 2005)
- Not Tonite (Single, 2004)
- Embeetious Art EP (2000)
- The Way Beyond Mixtape 1998 (1998)
- Way Beyond Mixtape (1995)

Embee & Ayla

- The Air (2017)
- Sweet (2017)
- Easy Love (2017)

Fair Ground (Symphony, 2013)

- Gåshud
- Smaka Luft
- Alla Har Drömmar
- Brev Från Framtiden
- De Ofödda Barnen
- Haru Pass
- Falafel
- Hopp

Skuggpoeten

- Skuggpoeten (album, 2010)
- En kväll i maj (single, 2010)
- I de gula träden (single edit) (2010)

Looptroop Rockers

- Mitt hjärta är en bomb (album, 2013)
- Aldrig (Single, 2013)
- Hårt mot hårt (Single, 2013)
- Trick Ill Down Economics (2012)
- Fuel (2012)
- Professional Dreamers (album, 2011)
- On Repeat (2010)
- Radiation (2009)
- Frigör musiken (2009)
- The Hits (2008)
- The Rarities (2008)
- Praying on a Liver (2008)
- Good Things (album, 2008)
- The Building (2008)
- Fort Europa (album, 2005)
- Don't Hate the Player (2003)
- The Struggle Continues (album, 2002)
- Fly Away (2002)
- Looptroopland (2002)
- Modern Day City Symphony (album, 2000)
- Long Arm of the Law (2000)
- Ambush in the Night (1999)
- Schlook From Birth (EP, 1999)
- Punx Not Dead (album, 1999)
- Heads or Tails (EP, 1998)
- From the Wax Cabinet (Album, 1998)
- From Beyond K-Line (EP, 1998)
- Unsigned Hype (EP, 1997)
- From the Wax Cabinet (Tape, 1996)
- Three Sick Steez (Tape, 1995)
- Superstars (Tape, 1993)

Per Vers

- Find mig her (single, 2013)
- Ego (album, 2011)
- Smuk kamp feat. Zap Mama (2011)
- Ironman (2011)
- Hav det godt (2011)
- Jag tjener kassen (2011)
- Ironman (2011)
- Nej tak (2011)
- Just Do it (2011)
- Kære lytter (2011)

Mofeta & Jerre

- Är Vi Där Nu? (2010)

Mary's Mine

- Can You Hear Me (2012)
- Spinning Around (2012)
- Giving You Back (2012)

Antennasia

- Metronome Wiper (Embee Remix) (2012)
- Velo-City (2008)
- Yojigen Kosa Shingo Ikeru

Queen's English

- Full Limit (2009)

Timbuktu

- Olympiska Spelen 2012 (2008)

Nomak feat. TOR

- Time of Reflect (2008)

Ninsun Poli

- Stay or Go (2008)
- Drifting (2008)
- Miss Behave (2008)

Promoe

- White Man's Burden (2006)
- Songs of Joy (Feat. Capleton)
- In the Morning (Feat. Daville)
- Eurotrash (Feat. Leeroy of Saïan Supa Crew)
- Songs of Joy (2006)
- The Long Distance Runner (2004)
- Marathon
- Long Distance Runner
- Constant Consumption
- Calm Down
- Long Distance Runner (2004)
- Government Music (2001)
- Dawn
- Big in Japan
- Prime Time
- Freedom Fighters
- Freedom Writers
- THX 1138
- Injected
- Conspiracy
- Positive & Negative
- Prime Time (2001)

The Casual Brothers

- Custumer's Choice (2003)
- The Casual Brothers (2001)

Sedlighetsroteln

- Släpp Fångarna Loss (2003)
- Hallå!
- Sedlighetsroteln (2001)
- Ring Snuten
- Looptroop Va' Här

PST/Q

- Natt Klockan Tolv På Dagen (2002)
- En Dåres Försvarstal (feat. Martin Westerstrand)
- Jag Ser
- Så Lät Det Då (feat. Supreme)
- Vi mot röset (feat. Supreme)
- Fan Snackar Du Om
- Jorå Saat E
- Storfräsare (feat. Timbuktu & Profilen)
- Egotripp
- Vi Mot Röset (2002)
- Pluralis Majestatis (1999)
- Jesuskomplex
- Tid Att Göra Upp Räkningen
- Håll Käften

Jol

- Life in the Sun (2006)

Mobbade Barn Med Automatvapen

- Nu Ännu Drygare (2003)
- Småsaker
- Nu ännu Drygare

Petter

- Reflexion (2007)
- Storstadsidyll (2006)

Ison & Fille

- Klippta Vingar (2004)

Chilly & Leafy

- Vilka är dom (2003)
- Vilka är dom (2002)

Soundtrack

- I Taket Lyser Stjärnorna (2009)
- Friendly Fire (2006)
- Quality Control (2004)
- Festival (2001)
- Jalla, Jalla (2000)

== See also ==
- Looptroop Rockers
