= Promoe =

Swedish rapper

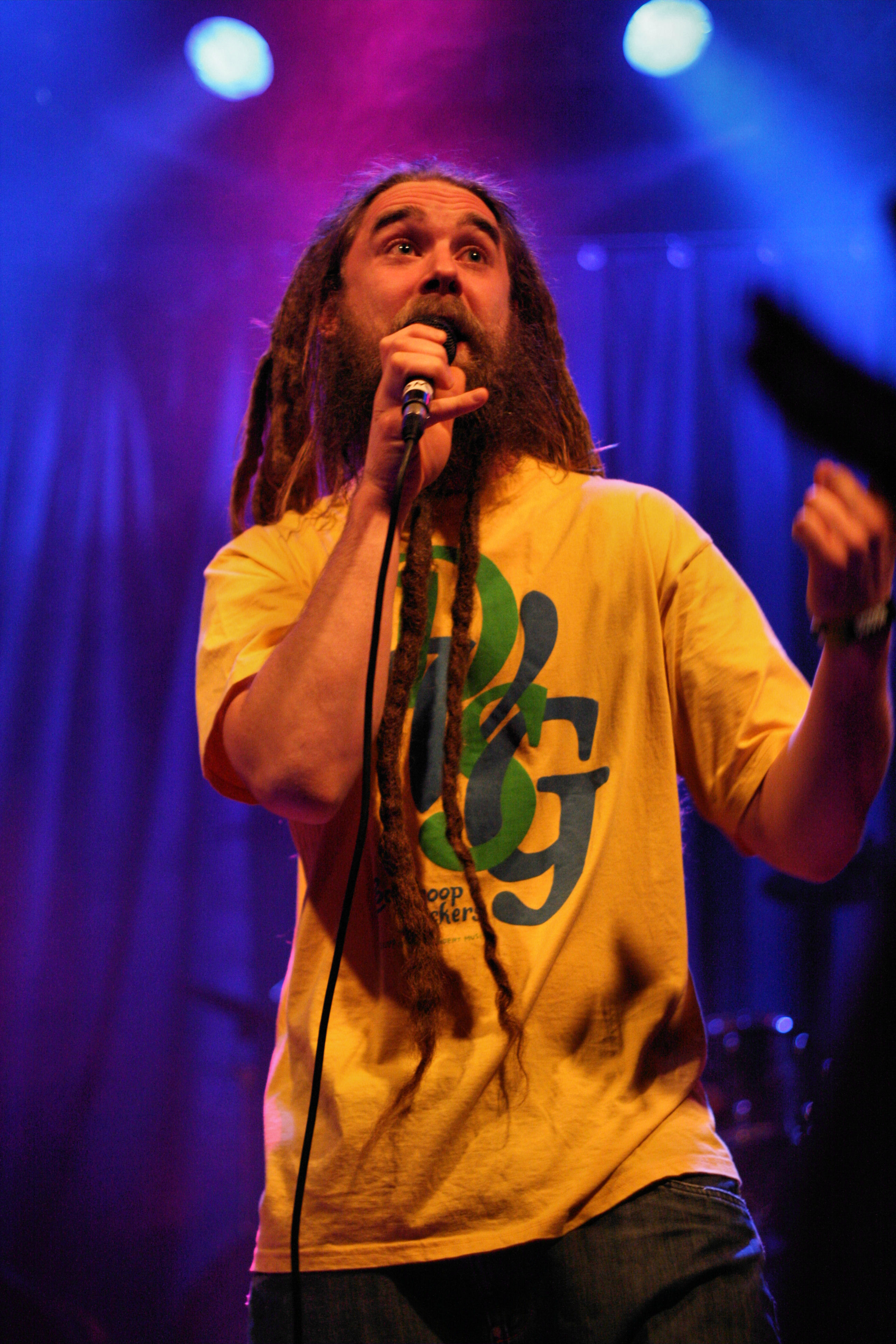
- Promoe in Tavastia Club, Helsinki 2008.

Background information
- Born: Nils Mårten Ed; 28 April 1976 (age 50); Västerås, Sweden
- Genres: Hip hop; reggae; electronic
- Occupations: Rapper; singer
- Years active: 1991–present
- Label: David Vs. Goliath
- Member of: Looptroop Rockers
- Website: www.looptrooprockers.com

Promoe (Mårten Edh, born Nils Mårten Ed; 28 April 1976) is a Swedish rapper and singer. He is a member of the Swedish hip hop group Looptroop Rockers, formed in Västerås, Sweden, in 1992. Promoe follows a vegan and straight edge lifestyle.

== Place in contemporary hip hop ==
Promoe released his third album in 2006, entitled White Man's Burden. It was followed by a DVD titled Standard Bearer, which included a documentary about the development of White Man's Burden and a concert from Copenhagen.

In 2006, the German rapper Kool Savas released a diss track where he slighted Promoe, German artists, and international artists. Promoe responded with the song "Sag Was", which he posted on the German hip hop site rap.de, and was also released on a 7" LP and the CD of Standard Bearer in 2007. Kool Savas did not respond.

Promoe has been featured on many tracks with both Swedish and international artists. The song "These Walls Don't Lie", produced by DJ Large and mixed by Soundism, used a sample from Hugo Montenegro's "Classical Gas", which had already been known for its use in "Mama" by late New York-based rapper Big Punisher.

On September 2, 2009, Promoe released the mixtape Bondfångeri.

Promoe released Kråksången in 2009, which was his first album in Swedish. The song "Svennebanan", featured on Kråksången, received airtime on several radio stations and 120,000 views after seven days on YouTube. "Svennebanan" reached #1 on Sverigetopplistan. The song criticizes Swedish culture by mockingly using the svennebanan (lit. 'Swede banana') stereotype. The song became popular, allegedly because of the song's Eurodisco beat, which was commented on in the song "Skäggig Vegan" (lit. 'Bearded Vegan'). "Skäggig Vegan" uses the same beat as "Svennebanan", and the titles are pronounced similarly. The lyrics to "Skäggig Vegan" are critical to the reception of "Svennebanan":

Swedish: Toppar listor i Danmark och Belgien, skulle det vara min drivkraft? Tänk igen. Det var seriös kritik av en kultur som får oss att må som skit. Men du kan välja att lyssna på Eurodiscoslingan så kan jag sälja fler singlar.

[Topping the charts in Denmark and Belgium, do you think that's my driving force? Think again. It was serious criticism of a culture that makes us feel like crap. But you can choose to listen to the Eurodisco loop so I can sell more singles.]

— Promoe, Skäggig Vegan

The second single featured on Kråksången, "Mammas Gata", was released on September 11, 2009.

== Discography ==
- Government Music (2001)
- The Long Distance Runner (2004)
- White Man's Burden (2006)
- Standard Bearer (2007)
- Kråksången (2009)
- Bondfångeri (2009)
- Mellan passion & mani (2015)
- Fult folk (2016)
- Public Enemy (2019) – Collaboration between Promoe and Don Martin
- The Art of Losing (2019)
- Spöken (2020)

== Personal life ==
Promoe engages in running and released a song titled "Long Distance Runner" in 2004, recorded and mixed by Soundism's Vladi Vargas and produced by Embee. Promoe has participated in the Sahara Marathon in 2016 and the Kilimanjaro Marathon in 2014.

Edh earned his law degree in 2021 from the Department of Law at the University of Gothenburg and that same year was employed as an associate at the law firm Hurtig & Partners in Malmö. In 2023, he began working at Malmö Advokatbyrå AB, and in 2025 he was admitted to the Swedish Bar Association.

== See also ==
- Swedish hip hop
- Looptroop Rockers
- Eastern Sunz, a hip hop duo who featured Promoe in one of their albums
