= The Struggle Continues (Looptroop album) =

Studio album by Looptroop
- Released: 2002
- Recorded: 2001 and 2002 at Wax Cabinet Studio in Sweden
- Genre: Hip hop
- Length: 58:43
- Label: David Vs Goliath; Burning Heart Records
- Producer: Embee

Looptroop chronology
| Modern Day City Symphony (2000) | The Struggle Continues (2002) | Fort Europa (2005) |

Singles from The Struggle Continues
- 1. "Looptroopland" Released: 2002; 2. "Fly Away" Released: 2002; 3. "Don't Hate The Player" Released: 2002

The Struggle Continues is the second album by Swedish hip hop band Looptroop. Released in 2002, it was produced by Embee.

The album peaked at No. 19 on the Swedish music charts.

== Critical reception ==
The Independent wrote that Looptroop's "command of English would put plenty of English MCs to shame and their carefully-enunciated rhymes are technically superb, though the real star is their producer/DJ Embee and his funky loops."

== Track listing ==
1. David vs. Goliath Hustlas - 1:23
2. Don't Hate the Player - 3:50
3. The Struggle Continues - 4:26
4. Looptroopland - 4:24
5. Looking for Love - 4:07
6. Revolutionary Step - 4:08
7. Musical Stampede - 4:55
8. Still Looking - 1:56
9. Who Want It - 3:57
10. Fly Away - 5:55
11. Up to the Sky - 1:00
12. Bandit Queen - 4:52
13. Get Ready - 4:04
14. Fruits of Babylon - 4:44
15. Last Song - 5:55
