= Timbuktu (Swedish rapper) =

Swedish singer and songwriter (born 1975)

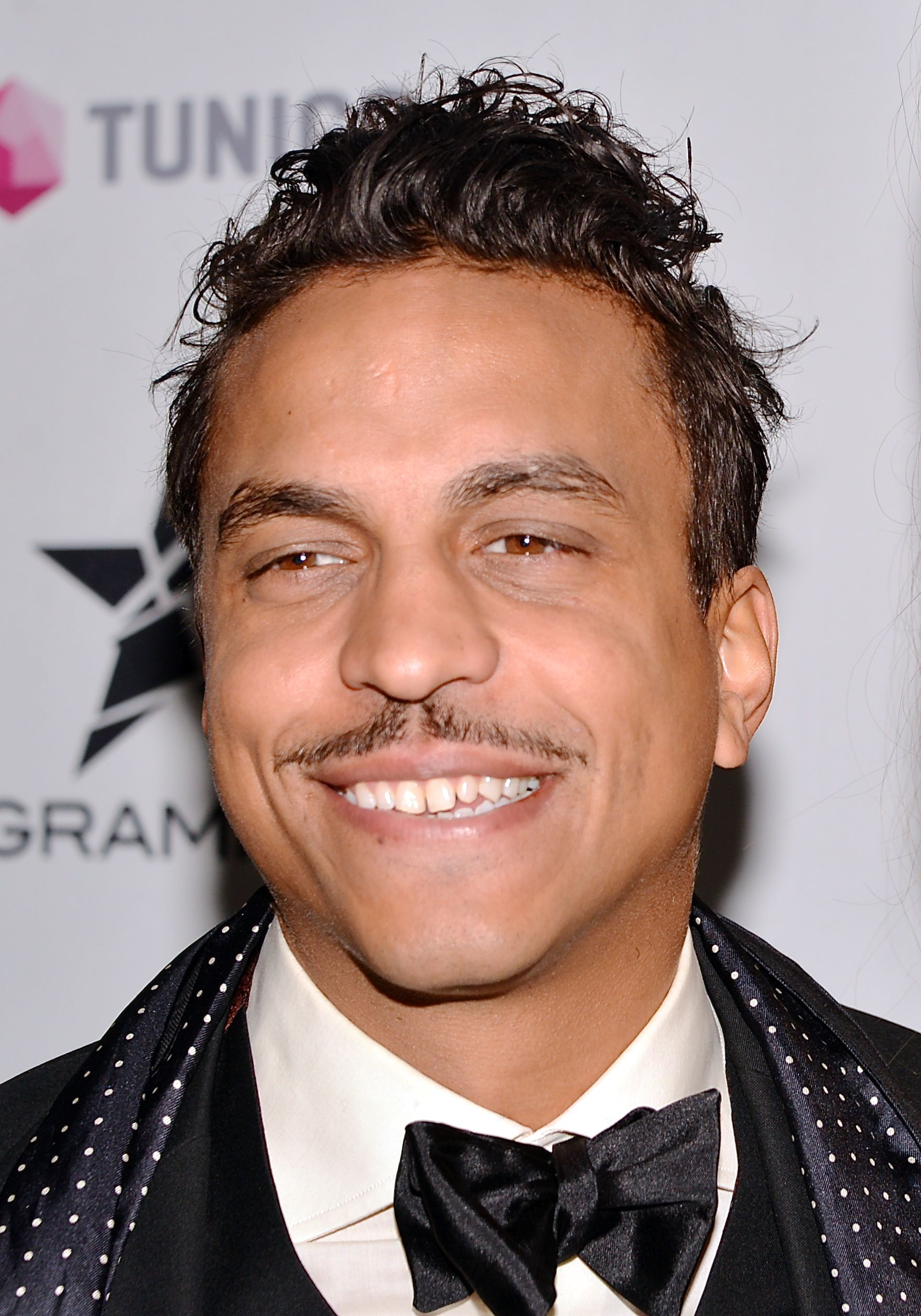
- Timbuktu at the Grammis Award 2013

Background information
- Also known as: Timbuktu
- Born: Jason Diakité; 11 January 1975 (age 51); Lund, Sweden
- Genres: Hip hop; reggae
- Occupations: Singer; songwriter; rapper
- Years active: 1990–present
- Label: JuJu

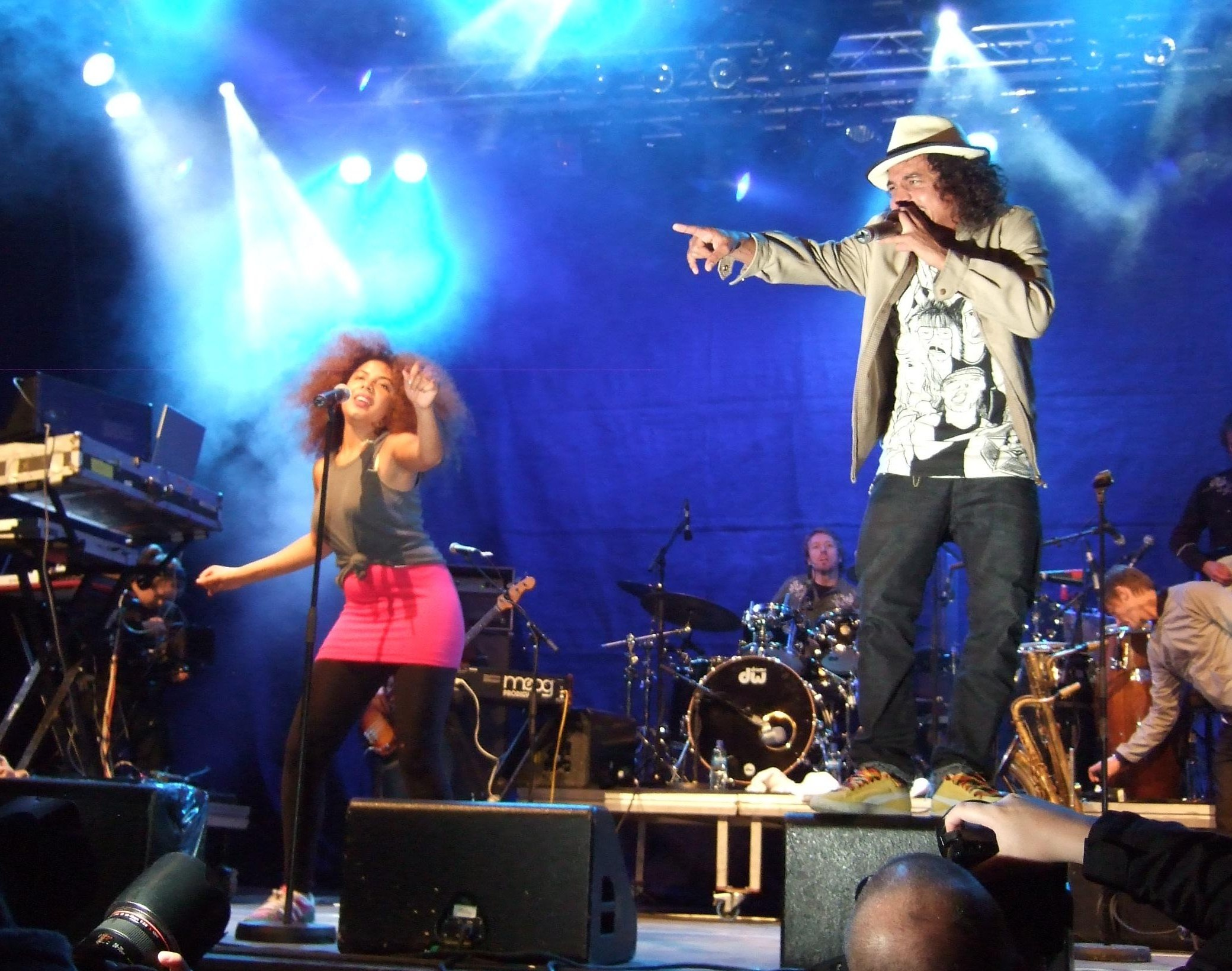
Timbuktu and DAMN, The Park Festival 2007

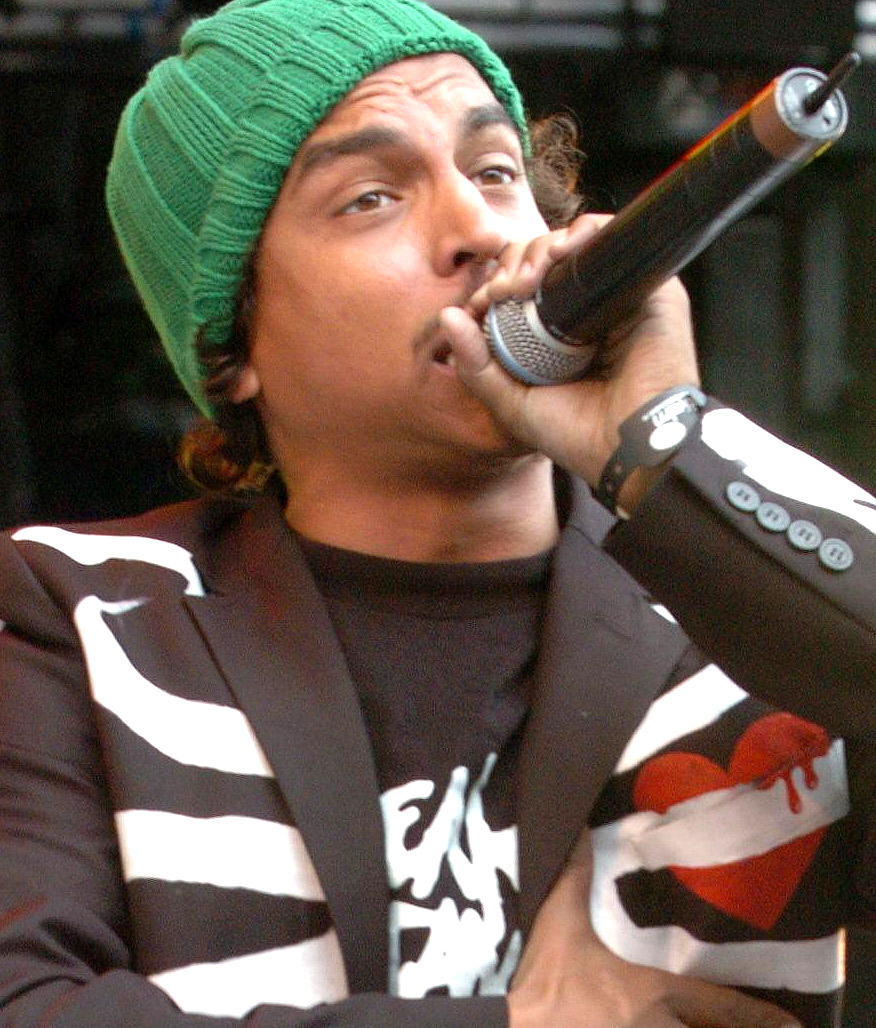

Jason Michael Bosak Diakité (born 11 January 1975 in Lund), better known by his stage name Timbuktu, is a Swedish rapper and singer, songwriter and television host. He took his stage name from the city of Timbuktu in Mali, a country where his father, Madubuko Diakité, has roots.

== Early life ==
Timbuktu is the son of Madubuko Diakité, a U.S. born Swedish human rights lawyer and academic. He grew up in Lund and is a native speaker of both English and Swedish, as his parents are from the United States.

== Career ==
Timbuktu started his career in the mid-1990s as part of the rap group Excel before going solo as Timbuktu. The inspiration for the pseudonym comes from the city of Timbuktu in Mali, where his father's family originally comes from.

Jason “Timbuktu” Diakité is one of Sweden’s most well-known and respected hip-hop artists. He released his first music in 1996 and has since released 10 solo albums and numerous singles of which the vast majority have reached Gold or Platinum status. His accolades also include eight Swedish Grammy awards, and four P3 Guld (Swedish radio) awards. Timbuktu’s highly acclaimed most recent album, "Du Gamla Du Nya", came out in 2021. On it he collaborated with Chords, Patrick Collén and Mapei, among others. On the back of this, Timbuktu released a new single with Sabina Ddumba called “Bygga Nytt” and collaborated with Mapei and Pontus Winnberg to create the children's song collection "Lullabies". In 2023 Timbuktu was the first Swedish artist to appear as a guest on the Norwegian version of "Så Mycket Bättre", called "Hver Gang Vi Møtes" after being one of very few artists to do the Swedish edition twice. Alongside his good friend, chef Marcus Samuelsson, Timbuktu also created the podcast "This Moment", featuring guests like Al Gore, Margot Wallström and Alice Bah Kuhnke.

In 2016 Jason released his first book, the critically acclaimed “En Droppe Midnatt” ("A Drop of Midnight"). It has sold more than 130,000 copies in Sweden and it entered the sales charts in both Sweden and Norway. A subsequent edition came out in English through Amazon Publishing. In "A Drop of Midnight" Jason tracks his family's history from the slave plantations in South Carolina to the welfare state Sweden. It's a gripping tale of ancestry, identity, resistance, racism and a longing to belong. In the fall of 2017 "En Droppe Midnatt" was turned into a hugely successful stage performance that played to full houses in both Sweden and Norway. On June 6th, 2022 the American version, “A Drop of Midnight”, opened at Harlem Stage in New York and played for six consecutive evenings. Then, on January 17, 2024, they showcased "A Drop of Midnight" in New York in conjunction with APAP, the largest conference in the USA for theater producers.

Timbuktu has continued to evolve as a writer, and his book about meat sauce, written with Joel Åhlin and Harald Wachtmeister, gained a lot of attention. He also continued to explore children's literature with Matilda Westerman and collaborated with Michael Bekele to create the audio drama "Härifrån", which won a Guldöra in 2023. In April 2024, the first TV series in which Jason has a major acting role, "Allt och Eva" (Warner Bros/Viaplay), will be released.

Timbuktu has hosted several shows on national Swedish radio like the music aid (radio and television show) Musikhjälpen from its start in 2008 until 2012, he received a Nordic language award and performed for audiences all over the world, from various corners of Africa to Svalbard, from the legendary the Apollo Theatre in NYC to the Roxy Theatre in LA, at the Polar Music Prize and at the Nobel Peace Prize. In 2023, Jason was appointed an honorary doctor by Lund University for his innovative authorship and versatile artistic work, capturing and reflecting on essential aspects of humanistic thought and research.

== Other engagements ==
Timbuktu is active as a goodwill ambassador for the United Nations Association of Sweden and previously served on the board of the Spoon Order Foundation. His autobiography, "En droppe midnatt" (A Drop of Midnight), was released in October 2016. The book traces his family history from slavery in the United States to the Swedish welfare state. In the autumn of 2017, it was adapted for the stage by director Farnaz Arbabi, with a subsequent Swedish tour in 2018.

== Discography ==
=== Albums ===
As part of Excel

- 1999: Bright Lights, Big City

Solo

Year	Album	Chart position	
Year	Album	SWE	NOR
2000	T2: Kontrakultur	56	—
2002	W.D.M.D. (Watt's dö madderfakking diil?)	8	—
2003	The botten is nådd!	5	—
2005	Alla vill till himmelen men ingen vill dö	3	7
2007	Oberoendeframkallande	1	7
2008	En high 5 & 1 falafel	5	—
2011	Sagolandet	2	12
2012	Pusselbitar	5	29
2014	För livet till döden	4	—
2018	En droppe midnatt	—	—
2018	Kärlekens Blandband (with Damn!)	—	—
2021	Lullabies (with Mapei)	—	—
2021	Du gamla du nya	19	—

Live albums

Year	Album	Chart position
Year	Album	SWE
2004	Live! (Timbuktu featuring Damn!)	56

=== Singles ===
As part of Excel

Year	Single	Chart position
Year	Single	SWE
1998	"Pump"	—
1999	"Allnite Long"	32
1999	"You Move Me"	—

Solo (as Timbuktu)

Year	Single	Chart position	
Year	Single	SWE	NOR
1996	"Lifestress" (Falcon & Sleepy featuring Timbuktu)	—	—
1999	"The Conspiracy"	—	—
2000	"Independent Moves"	—	—
2000	"Naked Lunch" (with Promoe)	—	—
2000	"MVH"	—	—
2001	"Pendelparanoia"	—	—
2001	"Northface EP"	—	—
2001	"Alla vet"	—	—
2002	"Gott folk"	37	—
2002	"Jag drar"	—	—
2002	"Ljudet av.."	—	—
2002	"The Bad Sleep Well EP" (with Promoe)	—	—
2003	"Vertigo" (with Promoe)	—	—
2003	"Ett brev"	52	—
2003	"The Botten Is Nådd"	24	—
2003	"Dynamit!" (featuring Peps Persson)	—	—
2004	"Alla vill till himmelen men ingen vill dö"	6	—
2005	"Det löser sej" (featuring Chords & Supreme)	31	19
2005	"Stirra ner"	52	—
2007	"Karmakontot"	15	—
2007	"Lika barn avvika bäst del 2"	51	—
2007	"Fantasi"	—	—
2007	Tolerância (with Simone Moreno)	—	—
2008	"Tack för kaffet" (with Dregen)	—	—
2011	"Dansa" (featuring Jan Lundgren, Dua Pannacotta)	—	—
2011	"Kapitulera" (featuring Susanne Sundfør)	—	12
2011	"Dödsdansen" (Single version)	—	—
2011	"Resten av ditt liv"	6	—
2011	"Allt grönt"	—	—
2011	"Kamouflage (Invisible)"	—	—
2011	"Kom och håll om mig"	38	—
2011	"Det gör ont"	—	—
2011	"Övertygad (True Believer"	—	—
2011	"Alla vill till himlen men ingen vill dö" (rerelease of 2004 hit)	46	—
2011	"Flickan och kråkan"	7	—
2011	"Snart tystnar musiken"	—	—
2012	"Cover Me - Københavnerkneipe"	—	—
2012	"Stanna kvar" (with Damn!)	—	—
2012	"Fallskärm"	26	—
2013	"Inte stor nog"	—	—
2014	"Triangeln"	—	—
2019	"Dansez"	—	—
2019	"Falken"	—	—
2019	"Bourgeois Shangri-La"	54	—
2019	"Början på allt" (featuring Eye N'I)	39	—
2019	"Regn hos mig"	65	—
2021	"AOD" (featuring Snoh Aalegra)	—	—
2021	"Viva" (with Mapei)	—	—
2021	"Bars från ett B-barn"	—	—
2021	"Hela världen väntar" (with Junie)	66	—
2021	"Comme ci, comme ça"	—	—
2022	"Bästa vi gjort" (with Lamix)	— (Note: "Bästa vi gjort" did not enter the Swedish Singellista Chart, but peaked at number four on the Swedish Heatseeker Chart.)	—

Featured in

Year	Single	Chart position	
Year	Single	SWE	NOR
2000	"Catch Me" (Antiloop feat. Timbuktu)	—	—
2000	"Rulla med oss" (Petter feat. Timbuktu, Peewee & Eye N'I)	34	—
2008	"Naïve" (Looptroop Rockers feat. Timbuktu)	58	—
2010	"Dasa Bala" (Arash feat. Timbuktu and Yag)	—	—
2010	"Let The Monkey Out" (Vinni & The Vagabonds feat. Timbuktu)	—	13
2012	"Kjører på" (Madcon feat. Timbuktu)	—	14
2012	"Lava Cabeza" (Mashup International feat Timbuktu, VAZ, Gnucci)	—	—
2013	"Svarta duvor & vissna liljor" (Kartellen feat. Timbuktu)	15	—
2017	"Like I Used Too" (Snoh Aalegra feat. Timbuktu)	—	—
2020	"Naken" (Anis Don Demina feat. Timbuktu)	39	—

== Filmography ==
In April 2010 Arash released a video for "Dasa Bala" featuring Timbuktu, Yag and Aylar Lie, which was directed and edited by Fred Khoshtinat.
