= Looptroop Rockers =

Swedish hip-hop group

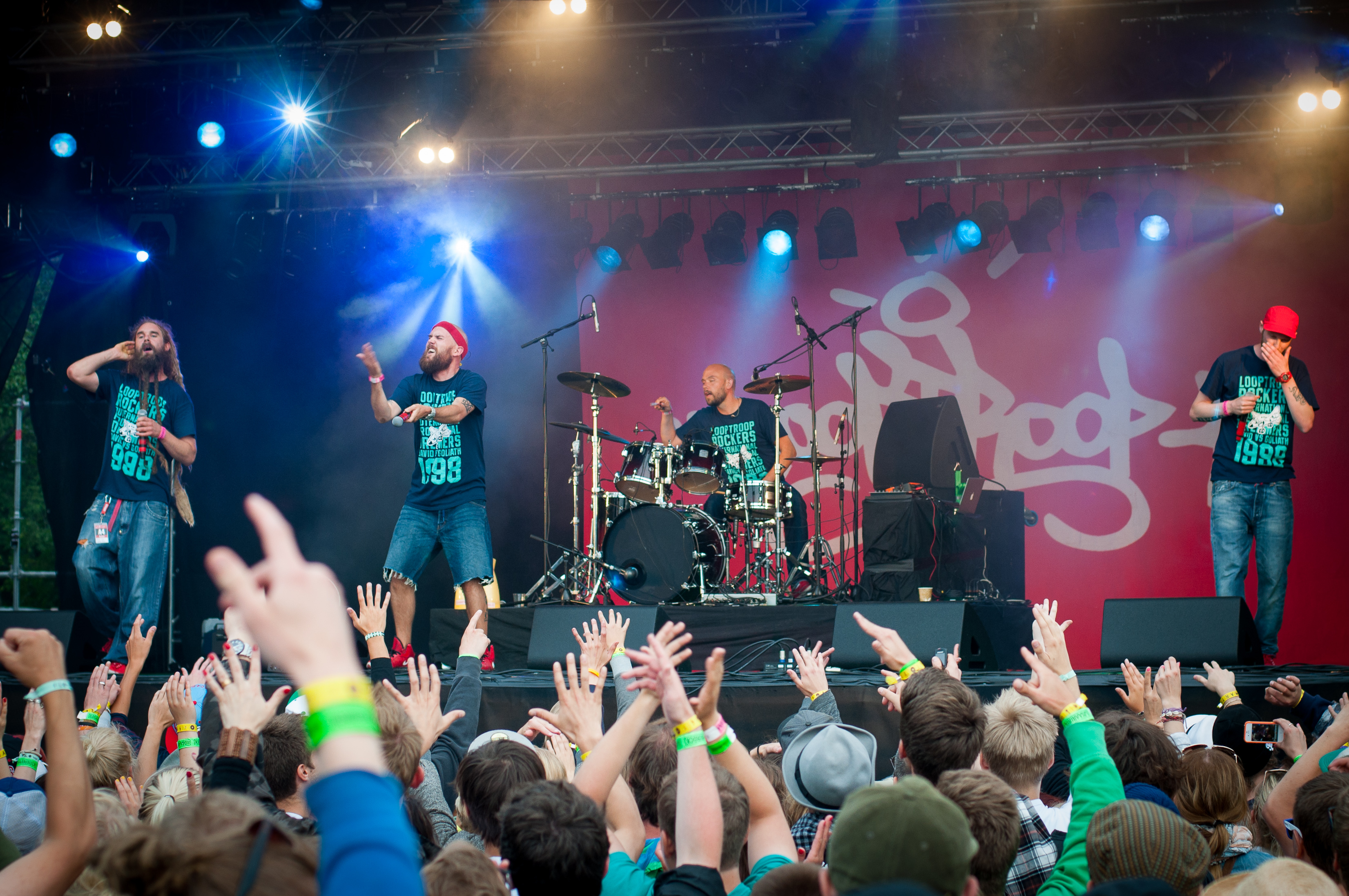
- Looptroop Rockers at the 2012 Ilosaarirock festival

Background information
- Origin: Västerås, Sweden
- Genre: Hip hop
- Years active: 1992–present
- Labels: David Vs Goliath; Burning Heart Records; Bad Taste Records
- Members: Promoe; Supreme; Embee; Cos.M.I.C
- Website: Official website

Looptroop Rockers is a hip hop group from Västerås, Sweden. The members are the rappers Promoe (Mårten Edh), Supreme (Mathias Lundh-Isen), DJ/Producer Embee (Magnus Bergkvist) and CosM.I.C (Tommy Isacsson). On their fourth album, Good Things, the group changed its name from Looptroop to Looptroop Rockers, a name used unofficially for some years prior to the change.

== Biography ==
Looptroop was formed in 1991 by Promoe and Embee. The two had met while attending school in Västerås and were still in their teens at the time of the group's inception. Cos.M.I.C joined shortly thereafter and in 1993 the group independently released their cassette-only debut EP Superstars, which was followed in 1995 by Threesicksteez. By the time they released their third cassette, From The Wax Cabinet (1996), long-time associate and frequent collaborator Supreme had become a permanent member of the group. It was in the pre-DVSG time when Promoe and Cos.M.I.C were also part of a group of graffiti writers called the "BIF" (Babylon Is Falling) crew in Västerås.

In 1998, Looptroop started their own record label, David Vs. Goliath (commonly referred to as DVSG), and with distribution handled by the Swedish punk rock label Burning Heart Records they released their full-length debut album Modern Day City Symphony in 2000. The album managed to sell reasonably well despite limited media exposure and spawned the underground hit single "Long Arm of the Law," which took a critical stance towards the Swedish police force and has since become one of Looptroop's signature songs.

In 2001, Promoe became the first member of the group to launch a solo career, with his debut solo album, Government Music. In 2002 Looptroop released their second album The Struggle Continues.

Embee's solo album Tellings From Solitaria was released in 2004 and featured contributions from several notable Swedish artists, including José González, Timbuktu, and Daniel Lemma. The album was critically acclaimed and won a Swedish Grammy Award for best hiphop/soul in 2004.

Their third full-length studio album, Fort Europa, was released in 2005. On the track "Fort Europa," the group takes a particularly critical tone towards their country's immigration policy. In the video, an image of a TV screen reading "Welcome SWE" is smashed by a golf club as the beat drops. In the first verse, Promoe compares immigration policy to the Berlin Wall.

On February 9, 2007, Cos.M.I.C announced that he was leaving the group indefinitely. He stated that there had been no falling-out between him and the rest of the group and mentioned that the group's busy schedule, which prevented him from spending time with his family, prompted this decision. Cos.M.I.C then contributed to two songs on the group's 2008 album "Good Things". After Cos.M.I.C left the group, they have also officially changed the group name from Looptroop to Looptroop Rockers!

Looptroop Rockers released their fourth album Good Things on 23 April 2008. Cos.M.I.C is featured on one of the tracks on the album. 2008 was also the year that DVSG was celebrating its 10th anniversary. Looptroop Rockers worked with artists like Rakaa Iriscience of the Dilated Peoples, CunninLynguists, Timbuktu, and Adam Tensta for this album.

On 21 May, 2010, Looptroop Rockers announced on their website that they were working on a new album. Promoe said it to be slated for a February 2011 release at a gig in Helsinki on May 19. On the same occasion it was announced that Cos.M.I.C. rejoined the group as a full member working on the new album.

In March 2011, the group released their fifth album "Professional Dreamers".

In 2013, Looptroop Rockers released Mitt hjärta är en bomb, their first Swedish album. It was made available on both CD and Vinyl LP.

In late October 2014, Looptroop Rockers released their album "Naked Swedes" on CD, LP and digital formats. It features guest appearances by Cunninglynguists, Seinabo Sey, and Sabina Ddumba. Lord Finesse produced an exclusive remix for the first single from the album, "Another Love Song".

In 2017, Looptroop Rockers was inducted into the Swedish Music Hall of Fame.

To celebrate 25 years as a band, Looptroop Rockers released 25 new songs in 25 weeks during 2017.

== Discography ==
=== Main albums ===
Looptroop

Year	Album	Peak positions
Year	Album	SWE
1993	Superstars	
1995	Threesicksteez	
1996	From the Waxcabinet	
1998	Punx Not Dead	
2000	Modern Day City Symphony	43
2002	The Struggle Continues	19
2005	Fort Europa	5

Looptroop Rockers

Year	Album	Peak positions
Year	Album	SWE
2008	Good Things	5
2011	Professional Dreamers	8
2013	Mitt hjärta är en bomb	11
2014	Naked Swedes	24
2018	Motivation Music	N/A

=== EPs ===
- 1996: From the Wax Cabinet EP
- 1996: Fuck A Record Deal (Looptroop/Headtag)
- 1997: Unsigned Hype
- 1998: From Beyond K-line (with Kashal Tee & Dj Erase)
- 1998: Heads or Tails EP
- 1998: Schlook From Birth
- 2000: Sedlighetsroteln

=== Singles ===
- 2005: "Fort Europa"/"Looptroop Radio" (Reached number 33 in Swedish Singles Chart)
- 2008: "Naive" (with Timbuktu)
- 2011: "Professional Dreamers"
- 2014: "Another Love Song" b/w "Beautiful Mistake" (with remix by Lord Finesse)
- 2014: "Slippin´"b/w "We Got Guns"

12" vinyl

- 1999: "Ambush in the Night"
- 2000: "Long Arm of the Law"
- 2002; "Fly Away"
- 2002: "Looptroopland"
- 2003: "Don't Hate the Player"
- 2005: "Fort Europa"
- 2008: "The Building"
- 2014: "Another Love Song" b/w "Beautiful Mistake" (with remix by Lord Finesse)

=== Solo Albums and Side Projects ===
Promoe

- 1999: Off the Record (single) b/w It's Promoe/Poor Lonesome Homeboy
- 2001: Government Music
- 2004: The Long Distance Runner
- 2006: White Man's Burden
- 2007: Standard Bearer
- 2009: Kråksången
- 2009: Bondfångeri
- 2010: Never Follow [EP]

Embee

- 1998: From the Way Beyond Mixtape
- 2000: Embeetious Art EP
- 2004: Tellings From Solitaria
- 2006: Mash Hits
- 2010: The Mellow Turning Moment
- 2015: Mellan passion & mani
- 2016: Fult folk

The Casual Brothers (Embee and Cos.M.I.C)

- 2001: The Casual Brothers
- 2003: Customer's Choice

== See also ==
- Swedish hip hop
- Hip hop music
