= Murs discography =

This is the discography for American hip hop musician Murs.

== Solo albums ==
Year	Title	Peak chart positions		
Year	Title	US	US Rap	US Ind
1997	F'Real: Label: Veritech; Format: CD, digital download	—	*	—
1999	Good Music: Label: Veritech (999); Format: CD	—	*	—
2000	Murs Rules the World: Label: LLCrew; Format: CD	—	*	—
2002	Murs Is My Best Friend: Label: LLCrew; Format: CD	—	*	—
2003	The End of the Beginning: Released: February 25, 2003; Label: Definitive Jux (48); Format: CD, digital download	—	*	27
2008	Murs for President: Released: September 30, 2008; Label: Warner Bros. (176828); Format: CD, digital download	45	11	—
2011	Love & Rockets, Volume 1: The Transformation: Released: October 11, 2011; Label: DD172/BLUROC; Format: CD, digital download	—	—	—
2012	Yumiko: Curse of the Merch Girl: Released: July 17, 2012; Label: Devil's Due Entertainment/Murs 3:16; Format: CD, digital download	—	—	—
2015	Have a Nice Life: Released: May 18, 2015; Label: Strange Music; Format: CD, digital download	94	6	12
2017	Captain California: Released: March 10, 2017; Label: Strange Music; Format: CD, digital download	—	—	22
2018	A Strange Journey Into The Unimaginable: Released: March 16, 2018; Label: Strange Music; Format: CD, digital download	—	—	—
2020	Love & Rockets, Volume 2: The Declaration: Released: December 15, 2020; Label: Murs 316; Format: CD, digital download	—	—	—

== Collaborative albums ==
Year	Title	Peak chart positions							
Year	Title	US	US R&B	US Rap	US Ind				
2001	Pals (with the Netherworlds): Released: October 10, 2001; Label: Basement; Format: CD, digital download	—	—	*	—				
2004	Murs 3:16: The 9th Edition (with 9th Wonder): Released: March 23, 2004; Label: Definitive Jux (80); Format: CD, digital download	—	87	—	16				
2006	Murray's Revenge (with 9th Wonder): Released: March 21, 2006; Label: Record Collection; Format: CD, CD/DVD, LP, digital download	166	70	—	15				
2008	Sweet Lord (with 9th Wonder): Released: July 23, 2008; Label: Record Collection; Format: CD, digital download	—	—	—	—				
2010	Fornever (with 9th Wonder): Released: April 13, 2010; Label: SMC (0425); Format: CD, digital download	87	—	—	—				
2011	Melrose (with Terrace Martin): Released: August 2, 2011; Label: Murs 316; Format: CD, digital download	—	—	—	—				
2012	This Generation (with Fashawn): Released: September 25, 2012; Label: Duck Down Music; Format: CD, digital download	164	—	—	—				
2012	The Final Adventure (with 9th Wonder): Released: November 13, 2012; Label: Jamla Records; Format: CD, LP, digital download	—	—	—	—				
2013	The Ghetto Is Tryna Kill Me (with The White Mandingos): Released: June 11, 2013; Label: Fat Beats Records; Format: CD, LP, digital download	—	—	—	—				
2014	¡MURSDAY! (with ¡MAYDAY! as ¡MURSDAY!): Released: June 10, 2014; Label: Strange Music; Format: CD, digital download	45	—	4	12				
2015	Brighter Daze (with 9th Wonder): Released: December 31, 2015; Label: Jamla Records; Format: CD, digital download	—	—	—	—				
2019	The Iliad is Dead and The Odyssey is Over (with 9th Wonder): Released: August 9, 2019; Label: Murs 316, Jamla, Empire; Format: CD, digital download								
2019	Thees Handz (with The Grouch (rapper)): Released: November 8, 2019; Label: Empire; Format: Vinyl, digital download	—	—	—	—	—	—	—	—
2020	He's the Christian, I'm the Rapper (with Dee-1): Released: September 18, 2020; Label: Mission Vision Music, Murs 316; Format: CD, digital download, streaming	—	—	—	—				

== EPs ==
- Comurshul (1996)
- Bac for No Good Reason (1996)
- 3:16 the EP (1999)
- Do More + Yeah EP (2000)
- Varsity Blues (2002)
- Def Cover (2003)
- Walk Like a Man (2005)
- Fat Bottom EP (with Z-Trip) (2006)
- Varsity Blues 2 (2011)
- Shut Your Trap (with Curtiss King) (2014)
- Murs In Miami (2020)
- Cavalcade of Cosmic Crips and Interplanetary Pirus (with Rob Viktum) (2022)
- ATL.A. (with Daily Bread) (2022)
- Guide To the World's Greatest Cities (2023)
- Take It Easy My Brother Murs (with El Lif Beatz) (2023)
- Speak n Spell (with Wiardon) (2023)

== Singles ==
Year	Title	Peak chart positions		Album
Year	Title	US Sales	US R&B Sales	Album
2000	"24 Hrs w/a G"	—	—	Good Music
2003	"Def Cover"	—	—	The End of the Beginning
2003	"God's Work"	64	—	The End of the Beginning
2003	"Risky Business" / "Brotherly Love"	—	73	The End of the Beginning
2005	"Bad Man!" / "3:16"	—	—	Murs 3:16: The 9th Edition
2005	"H-U-S-T-L-E" / "Bartender"	—	—	Murs 3:16: The 9th Edition
2007	"Better Than the Best"	—	—	Murs for President
2008	"Can It Be (Half a Million Dollars and 18 Months Later)"	—	—	Murs for President
2008	"Me and This Jawn"	—	—	Murs for President
2008	"Time Is Now" (featuring Snoop Dogg)	—	—	Murs for President

== Mixtapes ==
- Mursworld 2011 Winter/Spring (2011)

== Compilations ==
- Walk Like a Man (2005)
- The Genocide in Sudan (2005)
- Murs 3:16 Presents... Murs and the Misadventures of the Nova Express (2007)

== DVDs ==
- MCTV (1998)
- Walk Like a Man (2005)
- Murray's Revenge: The DVD (2007)

== Guest appearances ==
- Eligh - "7 Years (Wandering)" from A Story of 2 Worlds (1997)
- The Opus - "First Contact" from First Contact 001 (2002)
- Luckyiam - "Fuck Heroes" from Justify the Means (2002)
- Pigeon John - "2 Step" from Is Dating Your Sister (2002)
- RJD2 - "Final Frontier (Remix)" from The Horror (2003)
- Omid - "Live from Tokyo" from Monolith (2003)
- Scarub - "Aye Dios Mio" from A New Perspective (2004)
- Big Pooh - "Now" from Sleepers (2005)
- Subtitle - "Crew Cut (for Sale)" from Young Dangerous Heart (2005)
- DJ Z-Trip - "Breakfast Club" from Shifting Gears (2005)
- Oh No - "In This" from Exodus into Unheard Rhythms (2006)
- Mr. Lif - "Murs Iz My Manager" from Mo' Mega (2006)
- Terror - "Dibbs & Murs Check In" from Always the Hard Way (2006)
- Mestizo - "Even" from Dream State (2007)
- Busy P - "To Protect and Entertain" from Ed Rec, Vol. 3 (2008)
- The Grouch - "The Bay to LA" from Show You the World (2009)
- Bicasso - "It's On" from Rebel Musiq (2009)
- Skream - "8 Bit Baby" from Outside the Box (2010)
- 2Mex - "Rollercoaster" from My Fanbase Will Destroy You (2010)
- Kendrick Lamar - "She Needs Me (Remix)" from Overly Dedicated (2010)
- Isaiah Toothtaker - "Get Housed Homeboy" and "WTF You Say" from Illuminati Thug Mafia (2011)
- Evidence - "Outta My Mind" (2010)
- Potluck - "Hands Up" from Rhymes and Resin (2011)
- Tabi Bonney - "Hip Hop & Love" from The Summer Years (2011)
- Ab-Soul - "Big Payback" from Longterm Mentality (2011)
- ¡Mayday! - "Hardcore Bitches" from Take Me to Your Leader (2012)
- Self Jupiter & Kenny Segal - "Altered States" from The Kleenrz (2012)
- Isaiah Toothtaker - "LA Nights" from Sea Punk Funk (2012)
- Cadalack Ron + Briefcase - "Dead Horse" from Times Is Hard (2012)
- Tech N9ne - "Hard (A Monster Made It)" from Strangeulation (2014)
- Tech N9ne - "Strangeulation II" from Strangeulation (2014)
- Tech N9ne - "Which One" from Strangeulation (2014)
- Jonathan Emile "Edge of The World" from The Lover/Fighter Document LP (2015)
- Tech N9ne - "Blunt and a Ho" from Strangeulation Vol. II (2015)
- Tech N9ne - "Strangeulation Vol. II Cypher V" from Strangeulation Vol. II (2015)
- Del the Funky Homosapien, Fashawn & Black Thought - "Rise Up" from Street Fighter V (2016)
- Dream Junkies - "Left Coast" from Good Religion (2016)
- Godemis & Brotha Lynch Hung - "Bacon" from Dominion (2017)
- Murs - "Salute" (feat. Tech N9ne & ¡Mayday!) from Dominion (2017)
- Murs - "Mo' Ammo" (feat. Tech N9ne & Rittz) from Dominion (2017)
- JL. B Hood, Tech N9ne & Ubiquitous - "Is You the Police?" from Strange Reign (2017)
