= It's a Wonderful World Music Group discography =

This is a list of discographies by albums was released or distributed by It's A Wonderful World Music Group

== 2009 ==
=== Skyzoo - The Power of Words ===
- 01. "Intro"
- 02. "Clearer Hearing" (Produced by Fatin "10" Horton)
- 03. "Bells & Whistles" (Produced by Algorythm)
- 04. "Back On The Map" (featuring Maino) (Produced by Jake One)
- 05. "Appreciation" (Produced by Analogic)
- 06. "Freshfest" (featuring Wale) (Produced by Illmind)
- 07. "No Pretending" (Produced by Khrysis)
- 08. "Five Year Plan (Interlude)"
- 09. "The Don Cheadle Effect" (Produced by Ceased Werds)
- 10. "Do Remember" (featuring Young Chris) (Produced by 9th Wonder)
- 11. "Alphabet Soup" (Produced by J Dilla)
- 12. "We Are Jamla" (featuring Big Remo, GQ & Rapsody) (Produced by 9th Wonder)
- 13. "Left 4 Dead" (featuring EPMD) (Produced by 9th Wonder)
- 14. "Say What You Say" (featuring Rapper Big Pooh & Naledge) (Produced by Illmind)
- 15. "When I Rhyme" (featuring Talib Kweli & Reks) (Produced by Statik Selektah)
- 16. "We Belong" (Produced by 9th Wonder)
- 17. "Outro"

=== Tyler Woods - The R&B Sensation ===
All tracks produced by 9th Wonder

- 01. "Intro"
- 02. "Gotcha" (featuring Camp Lo)
- 03. "So Sinsurr"
- 04. "Just Like Daddy"
- 05. "Love The Way"
- 06. "Reachin' Out For Ya Love"
- 07. "Only Knew" (featuring Styles P)
- 08. "Who Gets Ya Love" (featuring Hos)
- 09. "Need To Know"
- 10. "You Know It" (featuring Fred the Godson)
- 11. "Silence"
- 12. "Stand By Ya (Tuff Soul)"
- 13. "Wanna Go"
- 14. "Straight To The Top"
- 15. "Maybelline Lady"
- 16. "I Can See The Sun"
- 17. "Who Ya Lovin"
- 18. "Like That"
- 19. "Can't Escape"
- 20. "I Can't Breathe"
- 21. "Stayed Away Too Long"
- 22. "Relations"
- 23. "Ms. Diva" (featuring Talib Kweli)
- 24. "Hold It Down" (featuring Buckshot & Talib Kweli)
- 25. "Prove Myself"
- 26. "I Want U (Again & Again)"
- 27. "Slow Jams - Relations"

=== Thee Tom Hardy & Don Cannon - The Hardy Boy Mystery Mixtape: Curse of thee Green Faceded ===
- 01. "Thee Tom Hardy Show" (Produced by E. Jones)
- 02. "Makin' It Last" (Produced by 9th Wonder)
- 03. "Family Ties" (featuring Big Remo & GQ) (Produced by 9th Wonder)
- 04. "Chillin' In My Bungalow" (Produced by Thee Band Geeks)
- 05. "Afterschool Special" (Produced by 9th Wonder)
- 06. "I'm Grinnin" (Produced by 9th Wonder)
- 07. "Make Her Mine" (featuring Tyler Woods) (Produced by E. Jones)
- 08. "EXTRAordinary" (Produced by Fatin "10" Horton)
- 09. "I'm the Ooh Child" (featuring Murs) (Produced by 9th Wonder)
- 10. "Go Like This" (featuring Reck Mason & GQ) Produced By Thee Band Geeks
- 11. "Rap $$$" (Produced by 9th Wonder)
- 12. "As We Shine" (featuring Rapsody & D-Mal) (Produced by 9th Wonder)
- 13. "Dzamnit Dawg" (featuring Ric Jones) (Produced by 9th Wonder)
- 14. "Okaaaaaay" (featuring Rapsody & TP) (Produced by 9th Wonder)
- 15. "We Rap Gr8" (featuring Harlem's Cash & Mikkey Halsted) (Produced by 9th Wonder)
- 16. "OMG!!!" (Produced by 9th Wonder)
- 17. "Boom Boom" (Produced by 9th Wonder)
- 18. "Never Had Seen" (Produced by 9th Wonder)
- 19. "Rap $$$ (Rocafella Remix)" (featuring Young Chris & Freeway) (Produced by 9th Wonder)

=== Skyzoo - The Salvation ===
- 01. "The Opener" (Produced by Cyrus The Great)
- 02. "Return of the Real" (Produced by Just Blaze)
- 03. "The Beautiful Decay" (Produced by 9th Wonder)
- 04. "My Interpretation" (Produced by Best Kept Secret)
- 05. "Popularity" (Produced by Nottz)
- 06. "Like a Marathon" (Produced by 9th Wonder)
- 07. "The Shooter's Soundtrack" (Produced by Cyrus The Great)
- 08. "Under Pressure" (Produced by 9th Wonder)
- 09. "Pendership" (Produced by Black Milk)
- 10. "Dear Whoever" (Produced by Illmind)
- 11. "For What It's Worth" (Produced by Eric G)
- 12. "The Necessary Evils" (Produced by Needlz)
- 13. "Easy to Fly" (featuring Carlitta Durand) (Produced by 9th Wonder)
- 14. "Bottom Line (Produced by Eric G)
- 15. "Metal Hearts" (Produced by 9th Wonder)
- 16. "Maintain" (Produced by Nottz)

== 2010 ==
=== The Away Team - Independence Day ===
All tracks produced by Khrysis

- 01. "Intro"
- 02. "Nobody"
- 03. "Let Off A Round"
- 04. "Sum Of Me" (featuring Evidence & Darien Brockington)
- 05. "Da Grind (Freestyle)"
- 06. "Last Man Standing" (featuring Amen & Eclipse)
- 07. "One (Freestyle)"
- 08. "The Shining"
- 09. "Come On Down" (featuring Tek & Steele)
- 10. "Watch Me (Freestyle)"
- 11. "The Blah Blah"
- 12. "UpNAtem"
- 13. "Greedy"
- 14. "The Jam (Freestyle)"
- 15. "Rockabye" (featuring Nervous Reck & Supastition)
- 16. "Onion Head (Freestyle)"
- 17. "Grind Season"
- 18. "Interior"
- 19. "Hip Hop Raw"
- 20. "Psycho Ward" (featuring Sean Price)
- 21. "The Odds"
- 22. "Fire It Up" (featuring 9thmatic)
- 23. "Chitter Chatter" (featuring Black Milk)
- 24. "Freestyle"
- 25. "The End Of The Day"
- 26. "Likka Hi"

=== Actual Proof - The (Fre)EP ===
- 01. "Introducing Actual Proof" (Produced by E. Jones)
- 02. "Moves Over Here" (Produced by AMP)
- 03. "Competitors" (Produced by AMP)
- 04. "Peace From The Riddler (Enigma)" (Produced by 9th Wonder)
- 05. "Skate Kids" (Produced by 9th Wonder)
- 06. "The Notch" (Produced by Mo' Heat)
- 07. "The Sandbox" (Produced by 9th Wonder)
- 08. "Let's Go" (featuring Rapsody) (Produced by AMP)
- 09. "The Look" (featuring Heather Victoria) (Produced by AMP)
- 10. "It's Cool (A Word To A. Gilliam)" (featuring Rapsody) (Produced by 9th Wonder)
- 11. "I Just Wanna Be" (featuring King Mez & TP) (Produced by 9th Wonder)
- 12. "Dig It" (Produced by 9th Wonder)
- 13. "Buzz Lightyear" (Produced by 9th Wonder)
- 14. "Genius" (Produced by 9th Wonder)
- 15. "Hot" (Produced by 9th Wonder)
- 16. "Ya Don't Stop (Like This)" (Produced by Khrysis)
- 17. "Coast" (Produced by E. Jones)
- 18. "Times Up" (featuring Halo, Rapsody, GQ & Sean Boog) (Produced by Eric G)

=== Big Remo - Entrapment ===
- 01. "What It Takes" (Produced by Khrysis)
- 02. "Don't Matter (Over There)" (Produced by AMP)
- 03. "The Game (Tre 4)" (Produced by 9th Wonder)
- 04. "Go" (featuring 9thMatic) (Produced by M-Phazes)
- 05. "Wonderbread" (featuring David Banner) (Produced by 9th Wonder)
- 06. "Mo Heat (Quiet Nights)" (Produced by Mo Heat)
- 07. "Girls Most Wanted" (featuring Colin Munroe) (Produced by Young Guru)
- 08. "Serenity" (Produced by Eric G)
- 09. "Go Ladies" (featuring Robert Alred) (Produced by Robert Alred & 9th Wonder)
- 10. "Woop Woop (Stand Back)" (featuring Ricky Ruckus & 9thMatic) (Produced by 9th Wonder)
- 11. "Entrapment" (Produced by Khrysis)
- 12. "What Is Your Name" (featuring Mela Machinko) (Produced by Fatin)
- 13. "It's Like That" (Produced by J.U.S.T.I.C.E. League)
- 14. "Grown Man Biz" (Produced by E. Jones)
- 15. "Without You" (Produced by Ka$h)
- 16. "Nothing's Gonna Stop" (featuring Tyler Woods) (Produced by E. Jones)

=== 9th Wonder - 9th's Opus: It's a Wonderful World Music Group Vol. 1 ===
- 01. "Monsoon Season" - Actual Proof feat. Halo (Produced by E. Jones)
- 02. "1000ft" - 9thmatic, Big Remo & Khrysis (Produced by Khrysis)
- 03. "I Will Always Be Down" - Heather Victoria feat. Rapsody (Produced by E. Jones)
- 04. "Trouble Man" - GQ (Produced by Fatin)
- 05. "Honda Accord Music" - Rapsody (Produced by 9th Wonder)
- 06. "College" - TP (Produced by E. Jones)
- 07. "Grinnin'" - Thee Tom Hardy (Produced by 9th Wonder)
- 08. "Who Gets Your Love" - Tyler Woods feat. Hos (Produced by 9th Wonder)
- 09. "Easy" - Skyzoo (Produced by 9th Wonder)
- 10. "Make The Most" - Actual Proof feat. Halo & Thee Tom Hardy (Produced by Ka$h)
- 11. "It's Real" - Big Remo (Produced by 9th Wonder)
- 12. "Bitch Be Gone" - The Away Team (Produced by Khrysis)

=== Heather Victoria - Victoria's Secret ===
- 01. "Victoria's Secret" (featuring Halo) (Produced by Young Guru)
- 02. "I'm Down" (Produced by Hi-Tek)
- 03. "I'll Always Be Down" (featuring Rapsody) (Produced by E. Jones)
- 04. "Addicted" (featuring Big Remo) (Produced by E. Jones)
- 05. "Getaway" (featuring TP) (Produced by E. Jones)
- 06. "Crush" (Produced by M-Phazes)
- 07. "Old Friend (Produced by E. Jones)
- 08. "You Need to Tell Me (featuring Brittany Street) (Produced by E. Jones)
- 09. "Rearview Mirror" (Produced by E. Jones)
- 10. "The Letter" (featuring Skyzoo) (Produced by E. Jones)
- 11. "Lesson Learned" (Produced by E. Jones)
- 12. "Loves You" (Produced by 9th Wonder)
- 13. "Never Let You Go" (Produced by 9th Wonder)
- 14. "Thank You Outro" (Produced by E. Jones)

=== Thee Tom Hardy & DJ Green Lantern - The Hardy Boy Mystery Mixtape: Secret of thee Green Magic ===
- 01. "Intro to thee Green Magic" (Produced by Commissioner Gordon)
- 02. "One 4 The Money" (featuring Donnis) (Produced by Eric G)
- 03. "True Talent" (featuring Add-2 the MC & Phil Ade) (Produced by Thee Band Geeks)
- 04. "A Tribe Called Pat" (Produced by Thee Band Geeks)
- 05. "I'm Grinnin'" (Produced by 9th Wonder)
- 06. "Fresh & Fly" (featuring 9thMatic & Khrysis) (Produced by Vitamin D)
- 07. "So Outrageous" (featuring GQ) (Produced by Thee Band Geeks)
- 08. "Epic Beard Man" (Produced by Khrysis)
- 09. "Around I Go" (featuring Deacon the Villain of CunninLynguists) (Produced by Kno of CunninLynguists)
- 10. "Take 'Em To..." (featuring Yelawolf) (Produced by 9th Wonder)
- 11. "A Different League" (featuring Skyzoo) (Produced by 9th Wonder)
- 12. "Always In Command" (Produced by 9th Wonder)
- 13. "Gibraltar Rock" (featuring Slimm Calhoun) (Produced by The Letter C)
- 14. "Isn't That Swell" (Produced by Thee Band Geeks)
- 15. "F*ck B*tches Get Money 2010" (featuring Big Remo & TP) (Produced by Truss-1)
- 16. "Off The Radar" (featuring Euro) (Produced by Eric G)
- 17. "Your Favorites" (featuring Rapsody) (Produced by E. Jones)

=== Rapsody - Return of the B-Girl ===
- 01. "Intro" (Produced by 9th Wonder)
- 02. "1983" (Produced by Kash)
- 03. "Win" (featuring Rah Digga) (Produced by AMP)
- 04. "I'm Ready" (featuring Heather Victoria) (Produced by DJ Premier)
- 05. "Blankin’ Out" (featuring Mac Miller) (Produced by 9th Wonder)
- 06. "Cherry On Top" (Produced by 9th Wonder)
- 07. "Little Things" (featuring Phil Ade) (Produced by 9th Wonder)
- 08. "Return of the B-Girl (Mara Jade)" (Produced by Khrysis)
- 09. "Love Tonight" (featuring Sundown) (Produced by Eric G)
- 10. "U Sparklin’" (Produced by 9th Wonder)
- 11. "Make It After All" (Produced by 9th Wonder)
- 12. "U Make Me Say" (featuring Heather Victoria) (Produced by 9th Wonder)
- 13. "Hoop Dreams to Rap Dreams" (featuring King Mez & Skyzoo) (Produced by E. Jones)
- 14. "No More Trouble" (featuring Enigma, Halo & Sean Boog) (Produced by 9th Wonder)
- 15. "Cipher Kid" (Featuring Big Remo) (Produced by 9th Wonder)
- 16. "Angel" (Featuring Laws) (Produced by 9th Wonder)
- 17. "Young Black With A Gift" (featuring Big Daddy Kane) (Produced by 9th Wonder)
- 18. "Little Things (Remix)" (featuring Thee Tom Hardy & Heather Victoria) (Produced by 9th Wonder)
- 19. "Honda Accord (Remix)" (featuring Skyzoo & Thee Tom Hardy) (Produced by 9th Wonder)
- 20. "My Melo My Man (Melo Anthony)" (featuring TP) (Produced by 9th Wonder)

=== Sean Boog - Light Beers Ahead of You ===
- 01. "Intro" (Produced by E. Jones)
- 02. "Light Beers Ahead of You (New Day)" (featuring Actual Proof)
- 03. "Gettin' Mine" (Produced by AMP)
- 04. "Bullshit" (Produced by AMP)
- 05. "Let It Bump" (featuring Thee Tom Hardy & E. Jones) (Produced by E. Jones)
- 06. "Drunken Style" (featuring Add-2) (Produced by Khrysis)
- 07. "Red Eye" (Produced by Khrysis)
- 08. "Takin' It" (Produced by Khrysis)
- 09. "Playground" (Produced by Khrysis)
- 10. "The Finest" (Produced by AMP)
- 11. "Never Settle" (featuring Halo, Rapsody & Sundown) (Produced by 9th Wonder)
- 12. "What It Is" (featuring Rapsody) (Produced by Khrysis)
- 13. "Goin' In" (featuring Big Remo) (Produced by Eric G)
- 14. "Boog Lightbeer" (featuring Halo) (Produced by Ka$h)
- 15. "Not A Game" (Produced by E. Jones)
- 16. "Moves (Stop)" (featuring TP & GQ) (Produced by 9th Wonder)
- 17. "Cold War Rap" (featuring Khrysis & King Mez) (Produced by Eric G)
- 18. "HuH" (featuring 9thmatic) (Produced by 9th Wonder)
- 19. "It's Cold (Go Inside)" (Featuring Halo & E. Jones) (Produced by Khrysis)
- 20. "Heroes" (featuring Big Remo, King Mez, Halo, GQ, TP & Rapsody) (Produced by 9th Wonder)
- 21. "Novacaine" (featuring Halo)
- 22. "Standing O" (Produced by 9th Wonder)

== 2011 ==
=== Actual Proof - The Talented Tenth ===
- 01. "Dream" (Produced by 9th Wonder)
- 02. "Let Me Ride" (Produced by 9th Wonder)
- 03. "Coast Pt. II" (featuring Tyler Woods) (Produced by Eric G)
- 04. "Light it Up" (Produced by Eric G)
- 05. "Peace Zulu" (featuring Halo) (Produced by The Sinopsis)
- 06. "Like That Y'all" (Produced by Eric G)
- 07. "Letta’ to Correta" (featuring Bird & The Midnight Falcons) (Produced by Khrysis)
- 08. "All in My Mind" (Produced by 9th Wonder)
- 09. "The March" (Produced by Khrysis)
- 10. "The Talented Tenth" (Produced by 9th Wonder)
- 11. "Super Genius" (featuring Cutlass Reid, Skewby, Naledge, Add2theMC, Kendrick Lamar, Brittany Street, The Kid Daytona & Laws) (Produced by 9th Wonder)
- 12. "Detroit Red" (Produced by Khrysis)
- 13. "Great Minds" (Produced by AMP)
- 14. "All Basic" (Produced by AMP)
- 15. "It's Simple" (Produced by Ka$h)
- 16. "Let Cha Know" (featuring Big Remo) (Produced by Khrysis)
- 17. "Breathe" (featuring Rapsody) (Produced by AMP)
- 18. "Whole Crew" (featuring Halo) (Produced by AMP)
- 19. "Desegregation" (featuring Thee Tom Hardy & Sean Boog) (Produced by Khrysis)
- 20. "The X Factor" (Produced by Khrysis)

=== Halo - Heat Writer II ===
- 01. "Topic of Conversation" (Produced by Khrysis)
- 02. "Mr. Ben Ready" (featuring Big Remo) (Produced by Khrysis)
- 03. "Jammin’ on the One" (Produced by Khrysis)
- 04. "Boom Bap for the Radio" (Produced by 9th Wonder)
- 05. "White Girl" (Produced by Ka$h)
- 06. "87 Lakers Magic" (Produced by Ka$h)
- 07. "The Real" (featuring Sean Boog) (Produced by AMP)
- 08. "Misunderstand" (featuring Khrysis) (Produced by Ka$h)
- 09. "Oh Really" (Produced by Ka$h)
- 10. "Cold Chillin’" (Produced by Khrysis)
- 11. "Follow Me (featuring GQ) (Produced by Khrysis)
- 12. "2Ways (Not a Damn Thing)" (Produced by AMP)
- 13. "The Jungle" (featuring Rapsody) (Produced by Ka$h)
- 14. "Hearing Aid" (featuring Thee Tom Hardy) (Produced by Ka$h)
- 15. "Nevermind" (Produced by Khrysis)
- 16. "So Vibrant" (featuring Sundown & E. Jones) (Produced by 9th Wonder)
- 17. "Shinin’ (You Are Here)" (Produced by 9th Wonder)
- 18. "Plan B" (featuring TP & Skyzoo) (Produced by 9th Wonder)

=== Tyler Woods - The Mahogany Experiment ===
All tracks, except for "Lost In Your Love" were produced by 9th Wonder

- 01. "Stayed Away Too Long"
- 02. "Only Knew" (featuring Styles P)
- 03. "Lost In Your Love" (Produced by E. Jones)
- 04. "I Wanna Love You (The Jodeci Tribute)"
- 05. "Be Together"
- 06. "I Want U"
- 07. "De Listen Jam"
- 08. "Ms. Diva" (featuring Talib Kweli)
- 09. "Silence" (featuring Hos)
- 10. "If I..."
- 11. "You & Me" (featuring Heather Victoria)
- 12. "This Goes Out 2 U"
- 13. "Heaven" (featuring Big Remo)
- 14. "Never Got Over (The Al Green Tribute)"

=== TP - TP Is My Hero ===
- 01. "Intro" (featuring Tyler Woods) (Produced by E. Jones)
- 02. "Gotta Work (Hustle Hard)" (featuring King Mez, Halo & Heather Victoria) (Produced by E. Jones)
- 03. "From The Tre 4 To The Dean Dome" (Produced by E. Jones)
- 04. "Amped Up" (Produced by AMP)
- 05. "I Found It" (Produced by 9th Wonder)
- 06. "Lucky Fella" (featuring Thee Tom Hardy) (Produced by Fatin)
- 07. "Man Up/Woman Up" (Produced by 9th Wonder)
- 08. "Dream Big" (featuring Rapsody) (Produced by Fatin)
- 09. "Word Up University" (Produced by E. Jones)
- 10. "Baby" (Produced by 9th Wonder)
- 11. "All You Need Is Me" (featuring Big Remo) (Produced by 9th Wonder)
- 12. "Crossroads" (featuring Phonte) (Produced by Fatin)
- 13. "Actuality" (featuring Actual Proof) (Produced by Eric G)
- 14. "I Wanna Be a Hero" (Featuring Heather Victoria & Skyzoo) (Produced by E. Jones)
- 15. "Young G" (Produced by AMP)
- 16. "Keep Goin' On" (Produced by 9th Wonder)

=== Big Remo - Robin Hood Ree ===
- 01. "Intro" (featuring Ricky Ruckus) (Produced by E. Jones)
- 02. "One For The Fam" (featuring The Away Team) (Produced by Khrysis)
- 03. "Molotov Ree" (Produced by Khrysis)
- 04. "Side of the City" (Produced by Eric G)
- 05. "Baby Mama House" (Produced by 9th Wonder)
- 06. "Takers" (Produced by AMP)
- 07. "Robinhood Ree" (Produced by 9th Wonder)
- 08. "Grind" (featuring Bun B) (Produced by E. Jones)
- 09. "Into The Darkness" (featuring Khrysis) (Produced by D.R.U.G.S.)
- 10. "Black Jedi" (Produced by Black Jeruz)
- 11. "Spit Game" (featuring Skyzoo) (Produced by Fatin)
- 12. "Know How It Goes Down" (Produced by 9th Wonder)
- 13. "Let It Ride" (Produced by Eric G)
- 14. "Living Our Dreams" (Produced by Young Guru)
- 15. "Spark Something" (featuring Tyler Woods & Laws) (Produced by Khrysis)
- 16. "Yota Music" (featuring Enigma) (Produced by 9th Wonder)
- 17. "Loyalty" (featuring Sean Boog) (Produced by AMP)
- 18. "Get Back Down" (Produced by 9th Wonder)
- 19. "Cipher Kid (Remix)" (featuring Rapsody) (Produced by 9th Wonder)
- 20. "Human Nature" (featuring Phonte) (Produced by E. Jones)
- 21. "Slumdog Millionaire" (Produced by 9th Wonder)
- 22. "Y'all Ain't Pimpin'" (featuring Tyler Woods) (Produced by 9th Wonder)

=== Heather Victoria - Graffiti Diary ===
- 01. "I'm Ready (Intro)" (Produced by E. Jones)
- 02. "When i Dream" (featuring Thee Tom Hardy) (Produced by Eric G)
- 03. "Missing You" (featuring Big Remo) (Produced by Khrysis)
- 04. "What I Need" (featuring Halo) (Produced by AMP)
- 05. "Your Lady" (featuring Laws) (Produced by Khrysis)
- 06. "Won't Stress Me" (featuring Rapsody) (Produced by Khrysis)
- 07. "Tore My Head Up" (Produced by 9th Wonder)
- 08. "Greatest Love of All" (Produced by Fatin)
- 09. "Graffiti Diary (Interlude)" (Produced by Ka$h)
- 10. "Go" (featuring Skyzoo)" (Produced by E. Jones)
- 11. "Time Is The Teacher" (Produced by 9th Wonder)
- 12. "Don't Ever Take Your Love Away" (Produced by E. Jones)
- 13. "My All (Outro)" (Produced by Marco Smoov)

=== Sean Boog - The Phantom of the Jamla ===
- 01. "Back And Forth" (Produced by Khrysis)
- 02. "One, Two, Three" (Produced by AMP)
- 03. "Morning" (Produced by 9th Wonder)
- 04. "Family" (Produced by Eric G)
- 05. "Fuckin' Wit Who" (featuring Sundown) (Produced by AMP)
- 06. "Fight The Feeling" (featuring Halo, Tyler Woods & Rapsody) (Produced by 9th Wonder)
- 07. "Never Dude" (featuring Halo & Sundown) (Produced by Eric G)
- 08. "Black Cloud" (Produced by Fatin)
- 09. "Natural" (featuring Halo & Sundown) (Produced by Eric G)
- 10. "Royalty" (featuring GQ & Tyler Woods) (Produced by AMP)
- 11. "The Phantom of the Jamla" (featuring Halo & Sundown) (Produced by Eric G)
- 12. "The Cycle" (Produced by Fatin)
- 13. "Weirdo Shit" (featuring Halo, Enigma & Sundown) (Produced by 9th Wonder)
- 14. "Get It Together" (Produced by 9th Wonder)
- 15. "Dreams Can Be Real" (Featuring E. Jones & Add2TheMC) (Produced by E. Jones)
- 16. "Me And You" (Produced by E. Jones)

=== Rapsody - Thank H.E.R. Now ===
- 01. "Thank You Pioneers"
- 02. "Thank H.E.R. Now" (Produced by 9th Wonder)
- 03. "Lemme Think" (Produced by 9th Wonder)
- 04. "Black Girl Jedi (Mara Jade)" (featuring Heather Victoria) (Produced by 9th Wonder)
- 05. "Top Five" (featuring King Mez & Laws) (Produced by AMP)
- 06. "Sweetest Hangover" (Produced by E. Jones)
- 07. "Out Tha Trunk" (Produced by AMP)
- 08. "Lampin'" (Produced by Eric G)
- 09. "One Time" (featuring Tab One, Charlie Smarts & Phonte) (Produced by 9th Wonder)
- 10. "Extra Extra" (featuring Mac Miller & Halo) (Produced by Khrysis)
- 11. "Fly GIrl Power!" (featuring Estelle) (Produced by 9th Wonder)
- 12. "Blankin' Out (Remix)" (featuring Jean Grae) (Produced by Khrysis)
- 13. "Sky Fallin' (My Mind)" (Produced by 9th Wonder)
- 14. "Love, Peace & Soul" (featuring Tyler Woods) (Produced by Ka$h)
- 15. "Baby Yeah!" (featuring Marsha Ambrosius) (Produced by 9th Wonder)
- 16. "So Be It" (featuring Big K.R.I.T.) (Produced by 9th Wonder)
- 17. "Black Diamonds" (featuring Raekwon) (Produced by 9th Wonder)
- 18. "H.E.R. Throne" (Produced by Nottz)
- 19. "Star Warz" (featuring Murs & Sundown) (Produced by Vitamin D)
- 20. "The State of The Union" (Produced by Eric G)

=== Actual Proof - Still Hotter Than July ===
- 01. "Get It Done" (Produced by 9th Wonder)
- 02. "Word Up" (Produced by E. Jones)
- 03. "No Doubt" (Produced by KP)
- 04. "One Two" (Produced by Enigma)
- 05. "Time" (Produced by Scottie Royal)
- 06. "2 High" (featuring Thee Tom Hardy) (Produced by Khrysis)
- 07. "Nice As I Am" (Produced by AMP)
- 08. "Paradise" (Produced by Enigma)
- 09. "The Marvel" (featuring Chuuwee) (Produced by 9th Wonder)
- 10. "Rod Strickland" (Produced by Khrysis)
- 11. "Zonin' (Blaow)" (Produced by 9th Wonder)
- 12. "Light of Day" (featuring GQ) (Produced by 9th Wonder)
- 13. "It Seems" (Featuring Sean Boog) (Produced by Ka$h)
- 14. "Words" (Produced by AMP)
- 15. "Represent" (featuring Rapsody) (Produced by AMP)
- 16. "Light The World" (featuring Sean Boog) (Produced by Khrysis)
- 17. "Take It Back" (featuring Drique London) (Produced by Khrysis)
- 18. "Calling Me" (featuring Median & Bluu Suede) (Produced by E. Jones)

=== Median - The Sender ===
- 01. "Take a Chance" (featuring Phonte) (Produced by Kev Brown)
- 02. "Bright Individual" (Produced by Khrysis)
- 03. "Open My Thoughts" (Produced by 9th Wonder)
- 04. "Turn Ya On" (featuring Phonte & Big Remo) (Produced by S1)
- 05. "Crazy Visions" (Produced by Khrysis)
- 06. "Okie Dokers" (featuring Khrysis) (Produced by Khrysis)
- 07. "Fresh Breath" (featuring Sundown & King Mez) (Produced by 9th Wonder)
- 08. "Sizzlin'" (featuring Rapsody) (Produced by Fatin "10" Horton)
- 09. "Right On"" (featuring Halo) (Produced by 9th Wonder)
- 10. "Hi Five" (Produced by AMP)
- 11. "Special" (featuring Phonte, YahZarah & Bahamadia) (Produced by Astronote)
- 12. "Kiss the Sky" (featuring Sy Smith) (Produced by 9th Wonder)
- 13. "The Sender" (Produced by 9th Wonder)

=== HaLo - The Blind Poet ===
- 01. "Rude Awakening" (Produced by 9th Wonder)
- 02. "Too Strong" (featuring Skyzoo) (Produced by Khrysis)
- 03. "Bag" (featuring Charlie Smarts) (Produced by Khrysis)
- 04. "Bussin" (featuring 9thmatic) (Produced by Khrysis)
- 05. "Lines" (featuring Rapsody & 9th Wonder) (Produced by AMP)
- 06. "Lesson In Keys" (Produced by 9th Wonder)
- 07. "Z's Up" (Produced by E. Jones)
- 08. "Night Riders" (featuring Sean Boog & GQ) (Produced by Eric G)
- 09. "Magical" (featuring Sean Boog & Thee Tom Hardy) (Produced by Khrysis)
- 10. "Birth Of A Sucka" (featuring Thee Tom Hardy) (Produced by 9th Wonder)
- 11. "Imagine That" (featuring Median) (Produced by AMP)
- 12. "Dead End Love" (Produced by Fatin "10" Horton)
- 13. "Dark Knight" (Produced by Khrysis)
- 14. "Ninja Gaiden" (Produced by Sinopsis)
- 15. "How Dare You" (featuring Sundown) (Produced by Vitamin D)
- 16. "Somebody" (featuring Big Remo) (Produced by Ka$h)

=== 9th Wonder - The Wonder Years ===
All tracks produced by 9th Wonder

1. "Make It Big" (featuring Khrysis)
2. "Band Practice Pt. 2" (featuring Phonte & Median)
3. "Enjoy" (featuring Warren G, Murs & Kendrick Lamar)
4. "Streets of Music" (featuring Tanya Morgan & Enigma of Actual Proof)
5. "Hearing the Melody" (featuring Skyzoo, Fashawn & King Mez)
6. "Loyalty" (featuring Masta Killa & Halo)
7. "Now I'm Being Cool" (featuring Mela Machinko & Mez)
8. "Never Stop Loving You" (featuring Terrace Martin & Talib Kweli)
9. "Piranhas" (featuring Sene & Sundown of Actual Proof)
10. "Peanut Butter & Jelly" (featuring Marsha Ambrosius)
11. "One Night" (featuring Terrace Martin, Phonte & Bird and The Midnight Falcons)
12. "Your Smile" (featuring Holly Weerd & Thee Tom Hardy)
13. "No Pretending" (featuring Raekwon & Big Remo)
14. "20 Feet Tall" (featuring Erykah Badu & Rapsody)
15. "That's Love" (featuring Mac Miller & Heather Victoria)
16. "A Star U R" (featuring Terrace Martin, Problem & GQ)
17. "Make It Big (Remix)" (featuring Big Remo) iTunes BT
18. "Band Practice" (featuring Phonte) iTunes BT
19. "Me and My Nuh" (featuring Teedra Moses) iTunes BT
20. "Base For Your Face" (featuring Lil B, Jean Grae & Phonte) iTunes BT

=== The Away Team - Scars & Stripes ===
All tracks produced by Khrysis

- 01. "Intro"
- 02. "Bad News" (featuring King Mez & Blue Raspberry)
- 03. "Scars & Stripes"
- 04. "4 The People"
- 05. "Cheers" (featuring Heather Victoria)
- 06. "What Is This" (featuring Evidence)
- 07. "The Road To Redemption"
- 08. "Drift"
- 09. "Set It Off" (featuring Talib Kweli & Rapsody)
- 10. "Happenin' Today"
- 11. "Hot Potato" (featuring Halo & Sundown)
- 12. "I Ain't Mad" (featuring Jay Rush)
- 13. "Paid" (featuring Laws & Big Remo)
- 14. "Proceed" (featuring Enigma)
- 15. "Get Down" (featuring GQ)
- 16. "Picture This" (featuring Kelsy Lu)
- 17. "See U Later" (featuring Phonte)

=== Rapsody - For Everything ===
- 01. "Pace Myself" (Produced by 9th Wonder)
- 02. "The Autobiography of M.E." (Produced by 9th Wonder)
- 03. "A Crush Groove" (Produced by 9th Wonder)
- 04. "The Woman's Work" (Produced by 9th Wonder)
- 05. "For Everything" (Produced by Khrysis)
- 06. "Ain't Worthy" (featuring GQ) (Produced by AMP)
- 07. "420 pm" (Produced by Khrysis)
- 08. "Jamla Girls/Jamla Boys" (Produced by 9th Wonder)
- 09. "ABC/Guilty" (Produced by Eric G)
- 10. "A Cold Winter" (featuring Freeway) (Produced by AMP)
- 11. "All Black Everything" (Produced by Eric G)
- 12. "Live It Up" (featuring Bluu Suede) (Produced by Khrysis)
- 13. "Rock the Bells" (featuring Kendrick Lamar) (Produced by Khrysis)
- 14. "Dear Friends" (Produced by 9th Wonder)

=== GQ - Trouble Man ===
- 01. "Moment of Silence" (Produced by E. Jones)
- 02. "Swag Like a Baller Player" (Produced by 9th Wonder)
- 03. "Too High" (Produced by Sinopsis)
- 04. "Gettin' Close (If You Can See)" (Produced by Fatin)
- 05. "ACC" (featuring Rapsody & Halo) (Produced by Khrysis)
- 06. "Optimus Prime" (featuring Bluu Suede & Rapsody) (Produced by Eric G)
- 07. "Don't Be Afraid" (featuring Halo) (Produced by Khrysis)
- 08. "Hands Up (Welcome to Oakland)" (Feat. Bluu Suede) (Produced by E. Jones)
- 09. "Mile High Club" (featuring Halo, Dave East & Heather V) (Produced by E. Jones)
- 10. "Blueberry Lemonade (Fa Sho)" (featuring Halo) (Produced by Eric G)
- 11. "King of the Pack" (featuring Sophia Fresh) (Produced by E. Jones)
- 12. "Forever in a Day" (Produced by Khrysis)
- 13. "Magnetic" (featuring Halo) (Produced by Khrysis)
- 14. "Met U" (Produced by 9th Wonder)
- 15. "So Cold" (featuring King Mez) (Produced by AMP)
- 16. "Just for You" (Produced by Ka$h)

=== Heather Victoria - Hip Hop Soul Lives ===
- 01. "Intro" (Produced by E. Jones)
- 02. "Not Taking You Back" (featuring Rapsody) (Produced by 9th Wonder)
- 03. "Nobody" (featuring Sundown) (Produced by Eric G)
- 04. "Go All In" (Produced by Khrysis)
- 05. "Mama Said" (Produced by E. Jones)
- 06. "Tonight" (featuring Sean Boog & Big Remo) (Produced by Hi-Tek)
- 07. "Escape" (Produced by Fatin)
- 08. "You and Me" (featuring Tyler Woods) (Produced by 9th Wonder)

== 2012 ==
=== Rapsody - The Black Mamba EP ===
- 01. "Shining Moment" (featuring Bluu Suede) (Produced by Eric G)
- 02. "Right Now" (Produced by 9th Wonder)
- 03. "Leave Me 'Lone" (Produced by 9th Wonder)
- 04. "Legends of the Fall" (Produced by Eric G)
- 05. "Ballin' One" (featuring Tab-One) (Produced by Khrysis)
- 06. "Respect Due" (Produced by 9th Wonder)
- 07. "With You" (Produced by 9th Wonder)

=== Actual Proof - Black Boy Radio ===
- 01. "Intro"
- 02. "Live From Cloud 9" (Produced by Khrysis)
- 03. "Black Boy Radio" (Produced by DJ Semaj)
- 04. "All the Way" (featuring Raheem DeVaughn)
- 05. "Headlights" (featuring Rapsody) (Produced by Fatin)
- 06. "Skate Kids II" (featuring Scoopay) (Produced by Khrysis)
- 07. "Poison Ivy Gloss" (featuring Geechi Suede) (Produced by 9th Wonder)
- 08. "Fonk It Up" (Produced by Hi-Tek)
- 09. "Fonk It Up (Reprise)" (Produced by Khrysis)
- 10. "I Got You" (featuring Bluu Suede) (Produced by Eric G)
- 11. "Show You the Way" (featuring TP) (Produced by 9th Wonder)
- 12. "Why You Wanna Pass Me" (Produced by Hi-Tek)
- 13. "So Into You" (featuring Sophia Fresh) (Produced by Dre Brown)
- 14. "We Gon' Continya" (Prod by AMP)
- 15. "The Feel" (Produced by Khrysis)
- 16. "Fresh Air" (featuring Heather Victoria) (Produced by Ka$h)
- 17. "Sojourner Truth" (Produced by 9th Wonder)
- 18. "Casa De La Hottest" (Produced by E. Jones)
- 19. "Many Microphones" (featuring 9thmatic & Rapsody) (Produced by The Mighty D.R.)
- 20. "A Letta to Coretta" (featuring Bird & the Midnight Falcons) (Produced by Khrysis)

=== Big Remo - Sleepwalkers ===
- 01. "They Gon' Hate" (Produced by Eric G)
- 02. "Reasons for the Safe" (Produced by AMP)
- 03. "I'm Back" (featuring Rapsody) (Produced by Khrysis)
- 04. "Swiss Cheese" (Produced by Ka$h)
- 05. "Ain't Nuthin'" (featuring GQ) (Produced by Fatin)
- 06. "Still Life" (featuring Halo & 9thmatic) (Produced by Khrysis)
- 07. "Good Day" (featuring Sadat X) (Produced by Fatin)
- 08. "You Know" (Produced by Khrysis)
- 09. "How Deep" (featuring Bluu Suede) (Produced by 9th Wonder)
- 10. "Blam Blam" (featuring Tiwony) (Produced by E. Jones)
- 11. "No Disrespect" (featuring Halo) (Produced by Ka$h)
- 12. "Go Ladies Pt. 2" (featuring Bun B & Bluu Suede) (Produced by E. Jones)
- 13. "Sleepwalkers" (Produced by Sleepwalker G)
- 14. "Forgot My Name" (Produced by AMP)
- 15. "Malcolm X" (Produced by E. Jones)

=== Sean Boog - Sean Boogie Nights ===
- 01. "Intro" (Produced by 9th Wonder)
- 02. "Sean Boogie Nights" (Produced by Ka$h)
- 03. "Big Boy Music" (Produced by 9th Wonder)
- 04. "New World" (Produced by AMP)
- 05. "A Love Never Dies" (featuring Rapsody & Khrysis) (Produced by 9th Wonder)
- 06. "Bug Spray" (Produced by Khrysis)
- 07. "You Wanna Ride" (featuring Enigma & Halo) (Produced by Ka$h)
- 08. "Rest of My Life (featuring Halo) (Produced by Ka$h)
- 09. "Still Getting Mine" (Produced by AMP)
- 10. "Keep On" (Produced by Eric G)
- 11. "Money Isn't Everything" (Produced by Khrysis)

=== Rapsody - The Idea of Beautiful ===
- 01. "Motivation" (featuring Big Rube) (Produced by Khrysis)
- 02. "How Does It Feel" (featuring Rocki Evans) (Produced by Khrysis)
- 03. "Precious Wings" (Produced by Eric G)
- 04. "Believe Me" (Produced by 9th Wonder)
- 05. "Non-Fiction" (featuring Raheem DeVaughn & Ab-Soul) (Produced by 9th Wonder)
- 06. "In The Drums" (featuring Heather Victoria) (Produced by 9th Wonder)
- 07. "Kinda Love" (featuring Nomsa Mazwai) (Produced by 9th Wonder)
- 08. "Celebrate" (Produced by E. Jones)
- 09. "Destiny" (Produced by Khrysis)
- 10. "Good Good Love" (featuring BJ the Chicago Kid) (Produced by 9th Wonder)
- 11. "In The Town" (featuring Nomsa Mazwai) (Produced by 9th Wonder)
- 12. "Round Table Discussion" (featuring Mac Miller & The Cool Kids) (Produced by 9th Wonder)
- 13. "The Cards" (featuring Big Remo) (Produced by AMP)
- 14. "Come Home" (featuring Rocki Evans) (Produced by Khrysis)
- 15. "When I Have You" (featuring Nomsa Mazwai) (Produced by 9th Wonder)
- 16. "Believe Me (HaHaHaHa Remix)" (Produced by 9th Wonder)
- 17. "Beautiful Music" (featuring Childish Gambino & GQ) (Produced by Ka$h)
- 18. "Thunder" (Produced by 9th Wonder)

=== 9th Wonder & Buckshot - The Solution ===
All tracks produced by 9th Wonder

- 01. "The Big Bang"
- 02. "What I Gotta Say"
- 03. "Stop Rapping"
- 04. "Crazy"
- 05. "The Feeling"
- 06. "Sam"
- 07. "Pat Em Down"
- 08. "Keep It Going"
- 09. "The Change Up"
- 10. "Shorty Left" (featuring Rapsody)
- 11. "You" (featuring Dyme-A-Duzin)
- 12. "The Solution"

=== Murs & 9th Wonder - The Final Adventure ===
All tracks produced by 9th Wonder

- 01. "Get Together" (featuring Rapsody)
- 02. "Whatuptho"
- 03. "Funeral for a Killer"
- 04. "Baby Girl (Holding Hands)"
- 05. "Walk Like a Woman"
- 06. "Tale of Two Cities"
- 07. "Dance with Me"
- 08. "Better Way"
- 09. "Wherever You Are"
- 10. "It's Over"

== 2013 ==
=== GQ - Death Threats & Love Notes: The Prelude ===
- 01. "Repetition" (Produced by Ka$h)
- 02. "Around the World" (Produced by E. Jones)
- 03. "I'm Gone" (Produced by Eric G)
- 04. "Too High" (Produced by Sinopsis)
- 05. "The Town" (Produced by 9th Wonder)
- 06. "Last Breath" (Produced by 9th Wonder)
- 07. "Memento" (Produced by Fatin)
- 08. "This Is Me" (featuring Carlitta Durand) (Produced by Fatin)
- 09. "Back Here" (Produced by Eric G)
- 10. "Amazing" (Produced by Eric G)
- 11. "Grind In" (Produced by AMP)
- 12. "I Know" (featuring Rapsody & Rocki Evans) (Produced by Khrysis)
- 13. "World Turns" (Produced by 9th Wonder)

=== Rapsody - She Got Game ===
- 01. "A Song About Nothing" (Produced by Eric G)
- 02. "Coconut Oil" (featuring Raekwon & Mela Machinko) (Produced by 9th Wonder)
- 03. "Thank You Very Much" (Produced by Khrysis)
- 04. "Everlasting" (Produced by Khrysis)
- 05. "Lonely Thoughts" (featuring Chance The Rapper & Big K.R.I.T.) (Produced by Denaun Porter)
- 06. "Caught Up" (featuring Raheem DeVaughn) (Produced by Khrysis)
- 07. "Generation" (featuring Mac Miller & Jared Evan) (Produced by 9th Wonder)
- 08. "Special Way" (Produced by Khrysis)
- 09. "Dark Knights" (Produced by E. Jones)
- 10. "My Song" (featuring Mela Machinko) (Produced by 9th Wonder)
- 11. "Complacent" (featuring Problem) (Produced by 9th Wonder)
- 12. "Facts Only" (Produced by Khrysis)
- 13. "Love After All" (featuring Gwen Bunn) (Produced by 9th Wonder)
- 14. "Kingship" (Produced by DJ Premier)
- 15. "Feel Like (Love Love)" (Produced by Ka$h)
- 16. "Never Fail" (Produced by Eric G)
- 17. "Never Know" (featuring Ab-Soul, Nipsey Hussle & Terrace Martin) (Produced by 9th Wonder)
- 18. "Jedi Code" (featuring Phonte & Jay Electronica) (Produced by 9th Wonder)
- 19. "80s & 90s Babies" (Produced by Sinopsis)
- 20. "The Pressure" (featuring Styles P) (Produced by Khrysis)
- 21. "IJS" (Produced by 9th Wonder)

=== Add-2 & Khrysis - Between Heaven and Hell ===
All tracks produced by Khrysis

- 01. "The Birth"
- 02. "Don't Go"
- 03. "Club Church/Club Hell"
- 04. "The Death Of Chicago"
- 05. "The Ugly Side Of Beautiful" (featuring GQ)
- 06. "It's Ok" (featuring Rapsody)
- 07. "They Call It"
- 08. "Runnin'"
- 09. "The Glorious"

== 2014 ==
=== Various Artists - Jamla Is the Squad ===
- 01. "God Willin'" by Actual Proof & TP (Produced by Khrysis)
- 02. "No Matter" by Halo, Masta Killa & Rocki Evans (Produced by AMP)
- 03. "Life of Pi" by Rapsody & Blu (Produced by Eric G)
- 04. "Bang" by Big Remo, Halo & Rapper Big Pooh (Produced by Khrysis)
- 05. "No Competition" by Talib Kweli, Elzhi & Phonte (Produced by Khrysis)
- 06. "Pretty Bird" by Halo, Masta Killa & Talib Kweli (Produced by Khrysis)
- 07. "Walk On By" by GQ & Heather Victoria (Produced by Khrysis)
- 08. "15 Minutes of Fame" by BJ the Chicago Kid & Add-2 (Produced by 9th Wonder)
- 09. "Bomber & a Fly Chick" by Add-2 (Produced by Khrysis)
- 10. "Betty Shabazz" by Rapsody (Produced by 9th Wonder)
- 11. "Drive Home" by Heather Victoria (Produced by Eric G)
- 12. "Rated Oakland" by GQ (Produced by 9th Wonder)
- 13. "Be Inspired" by Pete Rock, Lecrae & Rapsody (Produced by Khrysis)
- 14. "Shinin' Star" by Terrace Martin (Produced by 9th Wonder)
- 15. "Not Sure" by TP (Produced by Ka$h)
- 16. "At Night (3am Shit)" by Buckshot (Produced by 9th Wonder)
- 17. "Slum Livin'" by Big Remo, Ransom & Styles P (Produced by Ka$h)
- 18. "Love Unconditional" by Heather Victoria & Jadakiss (Produced by Ka$h)
- 19. "Illuminaughty" by Rapsody (Produced by 9th Wonder)
- 20. "Iron Mic" by Add-2 (Produced by 9th Wonder)
- 21. "Warriors" by Big Remo & Termanology (Produced by AMP)
- 22. "Knock Knock" by Add-2 & Sundown (Produced by Khrysis)
- 23. "All Good" by Joey Fatts & Rapsody (Produced by 9th Wonder)
- 24. "Soldier" by Big Remo & Halo (Produced by Eric G)

=== GQ - Rated Oakland ===
- 01. "The Promotion" (Produced by Eric G)
- 02. "Another Road" (Produced by Sinopsis)
- 03. "Think of Me" (Produced by Eric G)
- 04. "Count'em Up" (featuring Nipsey Hussle & Rapper Big Pooh) (Produced by 9th Wonder)
- 05. "Cooler" (Produced by E. Jones & Ka$h)
- 06. "With Me" (featuring Heather Victoria) (Produced by Eric G)
- 07. "Falls Down" (featuring Problem & Bad Lucc) (Produced by 9th Wonder)
- 08. "Last Breath II" (Produced by Khrysis)
- 09. "Tonight" (featuring Heather Victoria) (Produced by Eric G)
- 10. "Nice Guy" (Produced by Khrysis)
- 11. "Rated Oakland" (Produced by J.U.S.T.I.C.E. League & 8 Bars)
- 12. "Do This Forever" (featuring Halo) (Produced by Eric G)
- 13. "Come On Home" (Produced by 9th Wonder)
- 14. "Trap" (Produced by Eric G)

=== Halo - Mansa Musa ===
- 01. "Outchea" (Produced by Ka$h)
- 02. "Little Anne" (Produced by Eric G)
- 03. "No Matter" (featuring Masta Killa & Chauncy Sherod) (Produced by AMP)
- 04. "Galore" (Produced by Khrysis)
- 05. "Secrets" (featuring Tab-One) (Produced by Khrysis)
- 06. "Pretty Birds" (featuring Masta Killa & Talib Kweli) (Produced by Khrysis)
- 07. "Duck Alright" (Produced by Eric G)
- 08. "Figure It Out" (featuring Masta Killa & Median) (Produced by 9th Wonder)
- 09. "Merry Go" (featuring Masta Killa & Charlie Smarts) (Produced by Khrysis)
- 10. "Jerk Chicken" (Produced by Nottz)
- 11. "Stop It" (featuring Problem & Bad Lucc) (Produced by Khrysis)
- 12. "Snow Goggles" (Produced by Khrysis)
- 13. "Pretty Balloons" (featuring Rapsody) (Produced by Eric G)
- 14. "King" (featuring Masta Killa & Big Remo) (Produced by Ka$h)
- 15. "Gorgeous Regular" (featuring Heather Victoria) (Produced by Khrysis)
- 16. "Bonfire" (featuring Sundown) (Produced by Khrysis)

=== Rapsody - Beauty and the Beast ===
- 01. "Feel It" (Produced by Nottz)
- 02. "Who I Am" (Produced by Eric G)
- 03. "Hard to Choose" (Produced by 9th Wonder)
- 04. "Drama" (Produced by Khrysis)
- 05. "Waiting On It (Baby Girl)" (featuring Problem) (Produced by Eric G)
- 06. "The World" (Produced by Khrysis)
- 07. "Godzilla" (Produced by 9th Wonder)
- 08. "The Man" (Produced by Eric G)
- 09. "Coming for You" (Produced by 9th Wonder)
- 10. "Forgive Me (I'm Sorry)" (Produced by Eric G)
- 11. "Don't Need It" (featuring Merna) (Produced by Young Guru)
- 12. "For You" (Produced by Eric G)
- 13. "Believe Her" (featuring Merna) (Produced by 9th Wonder)

== 2015 ==
=== Add-2 - Prey for the Poor ===
- 01. "Prey for the Poor" (Produced by Nottz)
- 02. "Stop Play Rewind" (featuring Rapsody) (Produced by Khrysis)
- 03. "BRB" (Produced by Khrysis)
- 04. "Young Black Boy" (featuring Jamila Woods) (Produced by Khrysis)
- 05. "Say Goodbye" (Produced by Khrysis)
- 06. "Kool Aid" (featuring Rapsody & Sam Trump) (Produced by 9th Wonder)
- 07. "Green Light Party" (Produced by Khrysis)
- 08. "Set It Off" (Produced by 9th Wonder)
- 09. "One Night" (featuring Raheem DeVaughn) (Produced by Khrysis)
- 10. "On My Soul" (Produced by Khrysis)
- 11. "The Niggalude" (Produced by AMP)
- 12. "When You're Ready" (featuring Heather Victoria) (Produced by Ka$h)
- 13. "Good Mourning Black America" (featuring Sam Trump & Johndavid Provitt) (Produced by FC The Truth)
- 14. "We Gon Make It" (Produced by Khrysis)

=== Talib Kweli & 9th Wonder - Indie 500 ===
- 01. "Which Side Are You On" (featuring Tef Poe & Kendra Ross) (Produced by Nottz)
- 02. "Every Ghetto" (featuring Rapsody) (Produced by Hi-Tek)
- 03. "Pay Ya Dues" (featuring Problem & Bad Lucc) (Produced by Eric G)
- 04. "Lo-Fi" (featuring Niko Is) (Produced by Khrysis)
- 05. "Prego" (featuring Pharoahe Monch & Slug) (Produced by 9th Wonder)
- 06. "Life Ahead of Me" (featuring Rapsody) (Produced by 9th Wonder)
- 07. "Great Day in the Morning" (featuring Add-2) (Produced by 9th Wonder)
- 08. "Don't Be Afraid" (featuring Rapsody, Problem & Bad Lucc) (Produced by 9th Wonder)
- 09. "These Waters" (featuring K'Valentine, Niko Is, Chris Rob & Jessica Care Moore) (Produced by Nottz)
- 10. "King Shit" (featuring Niko Is & GQ) (Produced by E. Jones)
- 11. "Bangers" (featuring MK Asante & Halo) (Produced by Nottz)
- 12. "Technicolor Easels" (featuring Niko Is) (Produced by Khrysis)
- 13. "Understand" (featuring Brother Ali & Planet Asia) (Produced by Khrysis)

=== Murs & 9th Wonder - Brighter Daze ===
All tracks produced by 9th Wonder

- 01. "The Battle"
- 02. "God Black/Black God"
- 03. "How to Rob with Rob"
- 04. "Lover Murs"
- 05. "Get Naked" (featuring Problem)
- 06. "The Shutters" (featuring Bad Lucc & Reuben Vincent)
- 07. "Wait...Back It Up"
- 08. "If This Should End"
- 09. "Walk Like a God" (featuring Rapsody & Propaganda)
- 10. "Otha Fish"
- 11. "No Shots" (featuring Mac Miller, Vinny Radio, Franchise & Choo Jackson)
- 12. "Murs SuperStar"

== 2016 ==
=== GQ - Blended: The Relapse ===
- 01. "Boomerang Effect"
- 02. "Rent Due"
- 03. "Broadway Posse"
- 04. "For You Only"
- 05. "No Reason"
- 06. "Deja Vu"
- 07. "School Days"
- 08. "Top Floor"
- 09. "Next Exit"
- 10. "Contagious Thoughts"
- 11. "Playground"
- 12. "Collision"
- 13. "Cry Wolf"
- 14. "Highest Platform"

=== Rapsody - Crown ===
- 01. "Crown" (Produced by Eric G & 9th Wonder)
- 02. "Gonna Miss You" (featuring Raphael Saadiq) (Produced by 9th Wonder)
- 03. "Tina Turner" (Produced by Nottz)
- 04. "#Goals" (Produced 9th Wonder)
- 05. "Mad" (Produced by Eric G)
- 06. "Take It Slow" (Produced by Khrysis & 9th Wonder)
- 07. "Through with Him" (Produced by 9th Wonder)
- 08. "2 AM" (featuring Ab-Soul) (Produced by Khrysis & 9th Wonder)
- 09. "OooWee" (featuring Anderson .Paak) (Produced by Khrysis)
- 10. "Fire" (featuring Moonchild) (Produced by Ka$h, Khrysis & 9th Wonder)

== 2018 ==
=== Jericho Jackson (Khrysis & Elzhi) - Khrysis And Elzhi Are Jericho Jackson ===
All tracks produced by Khrysis

- 01. "World Of Illusion"
- 02. "Overthinking"
- 03. "Self Made"
- 04. "Cuffin' Season"
- 05. "Seventeen"
- 06. "F.R.I.E.N.D.S."
- 07. "To Do List"
- 08. "Talkin' Bout"
- 09. "Listen" (feat. Amber Navran)
- 10. "Breguets"
- 11. "Thank You"

=== Various Artists - Jamla Is the Squad 2 ===
- 01. "Welcome To Jamroc" by Reuben Vincent, Ian Kelly, Heather Victoria, GQ & Rapsody (Produced by Khrysis)
- 02. "Need To Exist" by Actual Proof (Produced by Kev Brown)
- 03. "Crazy" by Pharoahe Monch (Produced by Khrysis)
- 04. "No False Moves" by Reuben Vincent & GQ (Produced by Eric G.)
- 05. "Machine & McQueen" by Jericho Jackson & Conway The Machine (Produced by Khrysis)
- 06. "Ya Heard Me" by Don Flamingo (Produced by Khrysis)
- 07. "Japan" by Heather Victoria (Produced by The Gavin Quintet)
- 08. "I Spy" by King Draft Feat. CJ Fly (Produced by E. Jones)
- 09. "You Know I Gotta" by Reuben Vincent (Produced by Nottz)
- 10. "Jumpin'" by Busta Rhymes (Produced by 9th Wonder)
- 11. "Cojiba" by Black Thought (Produced by 9th Wonder & Eric G)
- 12. "Good to Me" by Amber Navran (Produced by Khrysis)
- 13. "Do Something" by Ian Kelly & Swank (Produced by 9th Wonder)
- 14. "Sojourner" by Rapsody Feat. J. Cole (Produced by 9th Wonder)
- 15. "Nothin' Greater" by SiR (Produced by 9th Wonder)
- 16. "P.A.N." by GQ (Produced by Khrysis)
- 17. "Shine" by ThHppyHr (Produced by Eric G.)
- 18. "Knockin' at My Door" by Big K.R.I.T., Jakki Jo & David Banner (Produced by 9th Wonder)
- 19. "Redblue" by Rapsody Feat. JID (Produced by Khrysis)
- 20. "One Love" by Heather Victoria (Produced by The Gavin Quintet)
- 21. "See It Through" by Actual Proof (Produced by Ka$h)
- 22. "Goodfellas" by Niko Brim, Swank, Charlie Smarts, GQ & Rapsody (Produced by Khrysis)
