= 9th Wonder production discography =

The following songs were produced by 9th Wonder (This list excludes those collaboration albums/mixtapes officially credited to 9th Wonder)

== 2000 ==
=== Cesar Comanche - Wooden Nickels ===
- 01. "WJLR Intro" (feat. Big Dho)
- 03. "Da Bagging"
- 04. "J-Villyrical" (feat. E.A.F.)
- 07. "WJLR Interlude" (feat. Big Dho)
- 08. "Postponed"
- 09. "Strange" (feat. Big Dho)
- 11. "No Respect" (feat. E.A.F.)
- 13. "Amnesia"

== 2002 ==
=== Cesar Comanche - Paper Gods ===
- 04. "Knowing is Half the Battle" (feat. Justus League, Sean Boog)
- 05. "Land of Hate"
- 06. "Underground Heaven"
- 07. "A-Game"
- 08. "WJLR Evening" (feat. 9th Wonder)
- 09. "Drought of 2002"
- 10. "Edited for T.V."
- 11. "Trust II" (feat. Sean Boog)
- 13. "Daily Operation" (feat. L.E.G.A.C.Y. & Sean Boog)
- 16. "WJLR Night" (feat. Edgar Allen Floe)

=== Binky Fingers - Where's Calvin? ===
- 02. "Where's Calvin?"
- 04. "I Don't Care"
- 05. "Come On"
- 06. "PMS"
- 10. "Fly Away" (feat. Little Brother & Big Dho)
- 11. "Hey Binky" (feat. Phonte)
- 13. "The Line"
- 15. "Ladies Man" (feat. Phonte)
- 17. "As I Die Slowly"

== 2003 ==
=== Jay-Z - The Black Album ===
- 07. "Threat"

=== Little Brother - The Listening ===
- 01. "Morning"
- 02. "Groupie Pt. II"
- 03. "For You"
- 04. "Speed"
- 05. "Whatever You Say"
- 06. "Make Me Hot"
- 07. "The Yo Yo"
- 08. "Shorty on the Lookout" (feat. Median)
- 09. "Love Joint Revisited"
- 10. "So Fabulous"
- 11. "The Way You Do It"
- 12. "Roy Lee, Producer Extraordinaire"
- 13. "The Get Up" (co-produced by Eccentric)
- 14. "Away from Me"
- 15. "Nobody but You" (feat. Keisha Shontelle)
- 16. "Home"
- 17. "Nighttime Maneuevers"
- 18. "The Listening"

== 2004 ==
=== De La Soul - The Grind Date ===
- 06. "Church" (feat. Spike Lee)

=== Masta Ace - A Long Hot Summer ===
- 03. "Good Ol' Love"
- 08. "Beautiful"

=== Termanology - Hood Politics II ===
- 08. "22 Years"

=== Braille - Shades of Gray ===
- 04. "10 years"

=== Destiny's Child - Destiny Fulfilled ===
- 05. "Is She the Reason"
- 06. "Girl"
- 12. "Game Over"

=== Jean Grae - This Week ===
- 08. "Supa Luv"
- 16. "Don't Rush Me"

=== Hierogylphics - The Building ===
- 01. "Make Your Move" (Remix)

=== Consequence - Take 'Em to the Cleaners ===
- 10. "I See Now" (feat. Kanye West & Little Brother)

== 2005 ==
=== M.O.P. - St. Marxmen ===
- 13. "Instigator"

=== Cesar Comanche - Squirrel and the Aces ===
- 01. "Get Ready" (feat. Median)
- 02. "The Life" (feat. Phonte & Darien Brockington)
- 05. "Up & Down" (feat. Eternia)
- 15. "Precious Time"
- 17. "Outro"

=== Little Brother - The Minstrel Show ===
- 01. "Welcome to the Minstrel Show"
- 02. "Beautiful Morning"
- 03. "The Becoming"
- 04. "Not Enough"
- 06. "Hiding Place"
- 07. "Slow It Down"
- 08. "Say It Again"
- 10. "Lovin' It"
- 11. "Diary of a Mad Black Daddy"
- 12. "All for You"
- 14. "Sincerely Yours"
- 15. "Still Lives Through"
- 16. "Minstrel Closing Theme"
- 17. "We Got Now"

=== Various Artists - NBA 2K6: Tracks ===
- 10. "Carolina Agents" -- Little Brother

=== Memphis Bleek - 534 ===
- 10. "Smoke the Pain Away" (feat. Denim)
- 12. "Alright"

=== Rapper Big Pooh - |Sleepers ===
- 03. "Strongest Man"
- 04. "Heart of the City"
- 05. "Every Block" (feat. Phonte)
- 10. "Scars" (feat. Joe Scudda, Median)
- 11. "Between the Lines"
- 13. "Now"
- 00. "Theme Music" (B-side to "The Strongest Man" VLS)

=== Sean Price - Monkey Barz ===
- 05. "Heartburn"

=== Mary J. Blige - The Breakthrough ===
- 06. "Good Woman Down"

=== L.E.G.A.C.Y. - Project Mayhem ===
- 04. "Lou's Tavern"
- 06. "Nice"
- 09. "Fast Girls"
- 10. "Cold As a Butcher"
- 11. "Insomnia"
- 12. "Pain in Life"
- 13. "Sista Girl" (feat. Keisha Shontelle)
- 14. "Broken Heart Disease"
- 16. "I'm Nothing"
- 17. "2 Sided Coin"
- 18. "Imperfect World" (feat. Keisha Shontelle, Percy Miracles)
- 19. "Dirty Bomb"

== 2006 ==
=== Boot Camp Clik - The Last Stand ===
- 01. "Here We Come"
- 07. "Take a Look (in the Mirror)"
- 11. "So Focused"

=== Lloyd Banks - Rotten Apple ===
- 14. "One Night Stand"

=== Smitty - The Voice of the Ghetto ===
- 08. "It's Alright"

=== De La Soul - The Impossible: Mission TV Series - Pt. 1 ===
- 17. "Freedom Train"

=== Strange Fruit Project - The Healing ===
- 09. "Special"

=== Obie Trice - Second Round's on Me ===
- 20. "Luv" (feat. Jaguar Wright) {Bonus Track}

=== Edgar Allen Floe - Floe Almighty ===
- 01. "Skyward"
- 05. "Floe Almighty"
- 07. "The Torch"
- 12. "The Righteous Way to Go (Remix)"
- 13. "Cruise"

== 2007 ==
=== Little Brother - Getback ===
- 03. "Breakin' My Heart" (feat. Lil Wayne)

=== Boot Camp Clik - Casualties of War ===
- 07. "I Need More"

=== Sean Price - Jesus Price Supastar ===
- 03. "P-Body"
- 06. "Violent"
- 12. "You Already Know" (feat. Skyzoo)
- 14. "Let It Be Known" (feat. Phonte)
- 15. "Hearing Aid" (feat. Chaundon)

=== Bishop Lamont - N*gger Noize ===
- 12. "First They Love You" (feat. Indef, Prime)

=== Pope Mobile ===
- 06. "I Just Want the Money" (feat. Bokey)

=== Drake - Comeback Season ===
- 20. "Think Good Thoughts" (feat. Phonte & Elzhi)

=== Erykah Badu - New Amerykah Part One (4th World War) ===
- 11. "Honey"

== 2008 ==
=== Jerry Blackwell - Reality Check ===
- 06. The Birds and the Bees

=== Ludacris - Theater of the Mind ===
- 14. "Do the Right Thang" (feat. Common & Spike Lee)

=== EPMD - We Mean Business ===
- 11. "Left 4 Dead" (feat. Skyzoo)

=== Murs - Murs for President ===
- 02. "I'm Innocent"
- 12. "Love and Appreciate II" (feat. Tyler Woods)
- 14. The Break up
- 15. "Breakthrough"

=== Chaundon - Carnage ===
- 07. "Understanding"
- 08. "Gone"
- 13. "Submission"

=== Akrobatik - Absolute Value ===
- 06. "Be Prepared" (feat. Little Brother)

=== Royce da 5'9" - The Bar Exam 2: The Album ===
- 13. "On the Low"

=== Torae - Daily Conversation ===
- 06. "Fantaztik 4"

== 2009 ==
=== KRS-One & Buckshot - Survival Skills ===
- 14. "Past, Present, Future" (feat. Melanie Fiona & Naledge)

=== Kenn Starr - It's Still Real... ===
- 11. "Wonder Why" (feat. Big Sean, Mike Posner, Wale)
- 18. "Sum Ish for Dave" (feat. Haysoos)

=== Big Pooh - The Delightful Bars (The North American Pie Version) ===
- 14. "Rear View Mirror"

=== Cesar Comanche - Die in Your Lap ===
- 03. "Choose"
- 08. "Hello World"
- 09. "Hands High"
- 10. "What's Wrong"
- 15. "Reborn"

=== Skyzoo - The Salvation ===
- 03. "The Beautiful Decay"
- 06. "Like a Marathon"
- 08. "Under Pressure"
- 13. "Easy to Fly" (feat. Carlitta Durand)
- 15. "Metal Hearts"

== 2010 ==
=== Erykah Badu - New Amerykah Part Two: Return of the Ankh ===
- 1. 20 Feet Tall

=== Asher Roth - Seared Foie Gras w/ Quince & Cranberry (Mixtape) ===
- 4. "Vagitables"

=== Big Remo - Wonderbread - EP ===
- 1. "Wonderbread" (feat. David Banner)
- 4. "Penny for Your Thoughts"
- 5. "The Build Up"

=== Sadat X - Wild Cowboys II ===
- 14. "X and Bill" (feat. Ill Bill)

=== Christopher Williams - The Way You Feel ===
- 00. "The Way You Feel"

=== Heather Victoria - Victoria's Secret ===
- 12. "Loves You"
- 13. "Never Let You Go"

=== Rapsody - Return of the B-Girl ===
- 01. "Intro"
- 05. "Blankin’ Out" (feat. Mac Miller)
- 06. "Cherry on Top"
- 07. "Little Things" (feat. Phil Ade)
- 10. "U Sparklin'"
- 11. "Make It After All"
- 12. "U Make Me Say" (feat. Heather Victoria)
- 14. "No More Trouble" (feat. Enigma, Halo & Sean Boog)
- 15. "Cipher Kid" (feat. Big Remo)
- 16. "Angel" (feat. Laws)
- 17. "Young Black with a Gift" (feat. Big Daddy Kane)
- 18. "Little Things (Remix)" (feat. Thee Tom Hardy & Heather Victoria)
- 19. "Honda Accord (Remix)" (feat. Skyzoo & Thee Tom Hardy)
- 20. "My Melo My Man (Melo Anthony)" (feat. TP)

=== Sean Boog - Light Beers Ahead of You ===
- 11. "Never Settle" (feat. Halo, Rapsody & Sundown)
- 16. "Moves (Stop)" (feat. TP & GQ)
- 18. "HuH" (feat. 9thmatic)
- 20. "Heroes" (feat. Big Remo, King Mez, Halo, GQ, TP & Rapsody)
- 22. "Standing O"

=== Thee Tom Hardy - The Hardy Boy Mystery Mixtape: Secret of thee Green Magic ===
- 05. "I'm Grinnin’"
- 10. "Take Em to..." (feat. Yelawolf)
- 11. "A Different League" (feat. Skyzoo)
- 12. "Always in Command"

=== Laws - 5:01 Overtime ===
- 15. "Shining"

== 2011 ==
=== Actual Proof - The Talented Tenth ===
- 01. Dream"
- 02. "Let Me Ride"
- 08. "All in My Mind"
- 10. "The Talented Tenth"
- 11. "Super Genius" (feat. Cutlass Reid, Skewby, Naledge, Add2theMC, Kendrick Lamar, Brittany Street, The Kid Daytona & Laws)

=== HaLo - Heat Writer II ===
- 04. "Boom Bap for the Radio"
- 16. "So Vibrant" (feat. Sundown & E. Jones)
- 17. "Shinin' (You Are Here)"
- 18. "Plan B" (feat. TP & Skyzoo)

=== Tyler Woods - The Mahogany Experiment ===
- 01. "Stayed Away Too Long"
- 02. "Only Knew" (Featuring Styles P)
- 04. "I Wanna Love You (The Jodeci Tribute)"
- 05. "Be Together"
- 06. "I Want U"
- 07. "De Listen Jam"
- 08. "Ms. Diva" (featuring Talib Kweli)
- 09. "Silence" (featuring Hos)
- 10. "If I..."
- 11. "You & Me" (featuring Heather Victoria)
- 12. "This Goes Out 2 U"
- 13. "Heaven" (featuring Big Remo)
- 14. "Never Got Over (The Al Green Tribute)"

=== Terrace Martin - The Sex EP ===
- 00. "Never Stop Loving You"

=== Lil B - Base for Your Face ===
- 00. "Base for Your Face" (feat. Jean Grae & Phonte)

=== TP - TP Is My Hero ===
- 05. "I Found It"
- 07. "Man Up/Woman Up"
- 10. "Baby"
- 11. "All You Need Is Me" (feat. Big Remo)
- 16. "Keep Goin' On"

=== Big Remo - L-R-G Presents Robin Hood Ree ===
- 05. "Baby Mama House"
- 07. "Robinhood Ree"
- 12. "Know How It Goes Down"
- 16. "Yota Music" (feat. Enigma)
- 18. "Get Back Down"
- 19. "Cipher Kid (Remix)" (feat. Rapsody)
- 21. "Slumdog Millionaire"
- 22. "Y'all Ain't Pimpin'" (feat. Tyler Woods)

=== Heather Victoria - Graffiti Diary ===
- 07. "Tore My Head Up"
- 11. "Time Is the Teacher"

=== Sean Boog - Phantom of the Jamla ===
- 03. "Morning"
- 06. "Fight the Feeling" (feat. Halo, Rapsody & Tyler Woods)
- 13. "Weirdo Shit" (feat. Halo, Enigma & Sundown)
- 14. "Get It Together"

=== Skyzoo - The Great Debater ===
- 04. "Designer Drugs"
- 10. "Get Him to the Greek"

=== Rapsody - Thank H.E.R. Now ===
- 02. "Thank H.E.R. Now"
- 03. "Lemme Think"
- 04. "Black Girl Jedi" (feat. Heather Victoria)
- 09. "One Time" (feat. Tab One, Charlie Smarts & Phonte)
- 11. "Fly GIrl Power!" (feat. Estelle)
- 13. "Sky Fallin' (My Mind)"
- 15. "Baby Yeah!" (feat. Marsha Ambrosius)
- 16. "So Be It" (feat. Big K.R.I.T.)
- 17. "Black Diamonds" (feat. Raekwon)
- 00. "Hella High"

=== Actual Proof - Still Hotter Than July ===
- 01. "Get It Done"
- 09. "The Marvel" (feat. Chuuwee)
- 11. "Zonin' (Blaow)"
- 12. "Light of Day" (feat. GQ)

=== Median - The Sender ===
- 03. "Open My Thoughts"
- 07. "Fresh Breath" (featuring Sundown & King Mez)
- 09. "Right On" (featuring Halo)
- 12. "Kiss the Sky" (featuring Sy Smith)
- 13. "The Sender"

=== HaLo - The Blind Poet ===
- 01. "Rude Awakening"
- 06. "Lesson in Keys"
- 10. "Birth of a Sucka" (featuring Thee Tom Hardy)

=== Phonte - Charity Starts at Home ===
- 02. "The Good Fight"
- 04. "Not Here Anymore" (feat. eLZhi)
- 05. "Eternally" (feat. Median)
- 11. "The Life of Kings" (feat. Evidence & Big K.R.I.T.)

=== Torae - For the Record ===
- 05. "Shakedown"
- 11. "Only Way (Interlude)"

=== Rapsody - For Everything ===
- 01. "Pace Myself"
- 02. "The Autobiography of M.E."
- 03. "A Crush Groove"
- 04. "The Woman's Work"
- 08. "Jamla Girls/Jamla Boys"
- 14. "Dear Friends"

=== GQ - Troubled Man ===
- 02. "Swag Like a Ball Player"
- 14. "Met U"

=== Heather Victoria - Hip Hop Soul Lives ===
- 02. "Not Taking You Back" (featuring Rapsody)
- 08. "You and Me" (featuring Tyler Woods)

== 2012 ==
=== Raekwon - Unexpected Victory ===
- 04. "A Pinebox Story"

=== Rapsody - The Black Mamba EP ===
- 02. "Right Now"
- 03. "Leave Me 'Lone"
- 06. "Respect Due"
- 07. "With You"

=== Actual Proof - Black Boy Radio ===
- 07. "Poison Ivy Gloss" (featuring Geechi Suede)
- 11. "Show You the Way" (featuring TP)
- 17. "Sojourner Truth"

=== Add-2 - S.ave O.ur S.ouls ===
- 03. "Going Going Gone" (featuring DeeJay Juice)

=== Lecrae - Church Clothes ===
- 07. "Rise"
- 14. "Long Time Coming" (featuring Swoope)

=== Big Remo - Sleepwalkers ===
- 09. "How Deep" (featuring Bluu Suede)

=== Sean Boog - Sean Boogie Nights ===
- 01. "Intro"
- 03. "Big Boy Music"
- 05. "A Love Never Dies" (featuring Rapsody & Khrysis)

=== Rapsody - The Idea of Beautiful ===
- 04. "Believe Me"
- 05. "Non-Fiction" (featuring Raheem DeVaughn & Ab-Soul)
- 06. "In the Drums" (featuring Heather Victoria)
- 07. "Kinda Love" (featuring Nomsa Mazwai)
- 10. "Good Good Love" (featuring BJ the Chicago Kid)
- 11. "In the Town" (featuring Nomsa Mazwai)
- 12. "Round Table Discussion" (featuring Mac Miller & The Cool Kids)
- 15. "When I Have You" (featuring Nomsa Mazwai)
- 16. "Believe Me (HaHaHaHa Remix)"
- 18. "Thunder"

=== Torae - Off the Record ===
- 03. "Steady Mobbin'"
- 08. "Only Way"

=== Talib Kweli - Attack the Block ===
- 14. "To the Music" (featuring Maino)

=== Skyzoo - A Dream Deferred ===
- 02. "Jansport Strings"

=== Sean Price - Mic Tyson ===
- 06. "Straight Music"

=== Robert Glasper Experiment - Black Radio Recovered: The Remix EP ===
- 01. "Afro Blue (9th Wonder Blue Light Basement Remix)" (featuring Erykah Badu & Phonte)

=== Masta Killa - Selling My Soul ===
- 09. "Food"

=== Rapper Big Pooh - Sleepers: The Narcoleptic Outtakes ===
- 07. "Hate Bitches" (featuring O-Dash)

== 2013 ==
=== GQ - Death Threats & Love Notes: The Prelude ===
- 05. "The Town"
- 06. "Last Breath"

=== Big K.R.I.T. - King Remembered in Time ===
- 14. "Life Is a Gamble" (featuring BJ the Chicago Kid)
- 15. "Gettin' Mine" (featuring Rapsody & Heather Victoria)
- 17. "Reign On"

=== Locksmith - The Green Box ===
- 08. "Stand It" (featuring Anesha)

=== Heather Victoria - Black Girl Story ===
- "Summer Day"

=== Rapsody - She Got Game ===
- 02. "Coconut Oil" (featuring Raekwon & Mela Machinko)
- 06. "Generation" (featuring Mac Miller & Jared Evan)
- 09. "My Song" (featuring Mela Machinko)
- 10. "Complacent" (featuring Problem)
- 11. "Love After All" (featuring Gwen Bunn)
- 15. "Never Know" (featuring Ab-Soul, Nipsey Hussle & Terrace Martin)
- 16. "Jedi Code" (featuring Phonte & Jay Electronica)
- 21. "IJS"
- 00. "Mass Hysteria"

=== Terrace Martin - 3ChordFold ===
- 02. "Triangle Ship" (featuring Kendrick Lamar) (produced with Terrace Martin)
- 04. "Something Else" (featuring Problem) (produced with Terrace Martin)
- 09. "Move On" (produced with Terrace Martin)
- 11. "Angel" (produced with Craig Brockman)

=== Fat Joe - The Darkside III ===
- 06. "9th Wonder"

=== Nipsey Hussle - Crenshaw ===
- 11. "Face the World"

=== Cory Mo - Take It or Leave It ===
- 11. "Special Delivery"

=== Rapper Big Pooh - Fat Boy Fresh, Vol. 3.5: Happy Birthday Thomas ===
- 17. "Jambalaya"

== 2014 ==
=== Various Artists - 9th Wonder Presents: Jamla Is the Squad ===
- 08. BJ the Chicago Kid & Add-2 - "15 Minutes of Fame"
- 10. Rapsody - "Betty Shabazz"
- 12. GQ - "Rated Oakland"
- 14. Terrace Martin - "Shinin' Star" (produced with Terrace Martin)
- 16. Buckshot - "At Night (3am Sh*t)"
- 19. Rapsody - "Illuminaughty"
- 20. Add-2 - "Iron Mic"
- 23. Joey Fatts & Rapsody - "All Good"

=== Verbal Kent - Sound of the Weapon ===
- 14. "Sound of the Weapon (9th Wonder Remix)"

=== GQ - Rated Oakland ===
- 04. "Count 'Em Up" (featuring Nipsey Hussle & Rapper Big Pooh)
- 07. "Falls Down" (featuring Problem & Bad Lucc)
- 13. "Come on Home"

=== Ea$y Money - The Motive of Nearly Everybody, Yo ===
- 10. "Takin It With Me"

=== Dilated Peoples - Directors of Photography ===
- 16. "The Bigger Picture" (featuring Krondon)

=== Ed O.G. - After All These Years ===
- 02. "Back and Forth" (featuring King Magnetic)

=== HaLo - Mansa Musa ===
- 08. "Figure It Out" (featuring Masta Killa & Median)

=== Rapsody - Beauty and the Beast ===
- 03. "Hard to Choose"
- 07. "Godzilla"
- 09. "Coming for You"
- 13. "Believe Her" (featuring Merna)

== 2015 ==
=== King Magnetic - Timing Is Everything ===
- 03. "Under Pressure"
- 11. "Believe" (featuring DJ Express)
- 16. "Kidnapped" (featuring Rapsody)

=== Jill Scott - Woman ===
- 16. "Beautiful Love" (featuring BJ the Chicago Kid)

=== Add-2 - Prey for the Poor ===
- 06. "Kool Aid" (featuring Rapsody and Sam Trump)
- 08. "Set It Off"

=== XL (Sadat X & El Da Sensei) ===
- 00. "We Must Stand"

=== Big Grams (Big Boi & Phantogram) - Big Grams ===
- 04. "Put It on Her"

=== Termanology - Term Brady - EP ===
- 05. "Grade A"

=== Big K.R.I.T. ===
- 00. "Guillotine Flow" (featuring Rapsody)

== 2016 ==
=== Anderson .Paak - Malibu ===
- 04. "The Season / Carry Me"
- 07. "Without You" (featuring Rapsody)

=== Vice Souletric - Vice for President, Vol. 2 ===
- 11. "Respect the Legends" (featuring King Magnetic)

=== Miles Davis & Robert Glasper - Everything's Beautiful ===
- 05. "Violets" (featuring Phonte)

=== Rapsody - Crown ===
- 01. "Crown" (produced with Eric G)
- 02. "Gonna Miss You" (featuring Raphael Saadiq)
- 04. "#Goals"
- 06. "Take It Slow" {produced with Khrysis}
- 07. "Through with Him"
- 08. "2 AM" (featuring Ab-Soul) {produced with Khrysis}
- 10. "Fire" (featuring Moonchild) {produced with Khrysis}

=== GQ ===
- "Guns Hang High" (featuring Rapsody) {produced with Khrysis}

== 2017 ==
=== King Magnetic - Everything Happens 4 a Reason ===
- 11. "Eyes" (featuring Recognize Ali & DJ Express)

=== Kendrick Lamar - Damn ===
- 14. "Duckworth"

=== Rapsody - Laila's Wisdom ===
- 02. "Power" (featuring Kendrick Lamar & Lance Skiiiwalker)
- 05. "Ridin'" (featuring GQ) (produced with Eric G)
- 07. "Nobody" (featuring Anderson .Paak, Black Thought & Moonchild) {produced with Khrysis}
- 08. "Black & Ugly" (featuring BJ the Chicago Kid)
- 09. "You Should Know" (featuring Busta Rhymes)
- 10. "A Rollercoaster Jam Called Love" (featuring Musiq Soulchild & Gwen Bunn)
- 11. "U Used 2 Love Me" (featuring Terrace Martin)
- 12. "Knock on My Door" (featuring BJ the Chicago Kid)
- 14. "Jesus Coming" (featuring Amber Navran)

=== Masta Killa - Loyalty Is Royalty ===
- 03. "Loyalty Is Royalty (R.I.F. - Rapping Is Fundamental)"
- 07. "Trouble"
- 09. "Down with Me" (featuring Sean Price)

=== Problem - Selfish ===
- 03. "Top Off" (featuring Airplane James)

== 2018 ==
=== Black Thought - Streams of Thought, Vol. 1 ===
- 01. "Twofifteen"
- 02. "9th vs. Thought"
- 03. "Dostoyevsky" (featuring Rapsody)
- 04. "Making a Murderer" (featuring Styles P)

=== Westside Gunn - Supreme Blientele ===
- 16. "Wrestlemania 20" (featuring Anderson .Paak)

=== Victory - The Broken Instrument ===
- 02. "Open Your Eyes"

=== Milez Grimez, Swann Notty - Murderous & Venomous ===
- 04. "Stunt Dobles" (featuring Mekalek)

=== Various Artists – 9th Wonder Presents: Jamla is the Squad II ===
- 10. Busta Rhymes - "Jumpin'"
- 11. Black Thought - "Cojiba" (co-produced with Eric G.)
- 13. Ian Kelly & Swank - "Do Something"
- 14. Rapsody - "Sojourner" (featuring J. Cole)
- 15. SiR - "Nothing Greater"
- 18. Big K.R.I.T., Jakk Jo & David Banner - "Knocking at My Door"

=== Anderson .Paak - Oxnard ===
- 06. "Saviers Road"

== 2019 ==
=== Smif-n-Wessun - The All ===
- 03. "DreamLand" (feat. Raekwon & Heather Victoria)
- 05. "Let It Go"
- 08. "The A.L.L."

=== 2 Chainz - Rap or Go to the League ===
- 02. "Threat 2 Society"

=== Rapsody - Eve ===
- 02. "Cleo"
- 08. "Maya" (feat. K. Roosevelt
- 09. "Ibtihaj" (feat. D'Angelo & GZA)
- 11. "Reyna's Interlude"
- 13. "Iman" (feat. SiR & JID)
- 15. "Sojourner" (feat. J. Cole)
- 16. "Afeni" (feat. PJ Morton)

=== Murs - The Iliad Is Dead and the Odyssey Is Over ===
- 01. "The Hulk"
- 02. "Cancun '" (feat. Pookie Blow & $ilk Money)
- 03. "My Hero" (feat. Heather Victoria)
- 04. "Ga$ Station Gucci Belt"
- 05. "Unicorn Glitter"
- 06. "High Noon" (feat. Rapsody & Reuben Vincent)
- 07. "Night Shift"
- 08. "Give Me a Reason"
- 09. "Super Cojo Bros." (feat. GQ & Cojo)

=== 10. "F**k Them" ===
- 11. "Tony Robbins Pocketbook"
- 12. "Sin"

== 2020 ==
=== 4-IZE - Look Into My Ize ===
- 15. "How'd That Work Out"

=== Busta Rhymes - Extinction Level Event 2: The Wrath of God ===
- 15. "Best I Can" (featuring Rapsody)

=== Russ - CHOMP ===
- 05. "Momentum" (featuring Black Thought, Benny The Butcher)

=== Terrace Martin - Village Days ===
- 01. "Neighborhood"

=== Various Artists - I Can't Breathe/Music for the Movement ===
- 02. "Pray Mamma Don't Cry"-- Rapsody featuring Bilal

=== Conway the Machine - From King to a God ===
- 18. "Serena vs. Venus"

=== J. Cole ===
- "Legendary" (featuring 9th Wonder & Joey Badass)

=== T.I. - The L.I.B.R.A. ===
- 14. "Horizons"

== 2021 ==
=== DJ Khaled - Khaled Khaled ===
- 14. "Where You Come From" (featuring Buju Banton, Capleton, Bounty KIller) {produced with STREETRUNNER, DJ Khaled & Tarik Azzouz}

=== Summer Walker - Still Over It ===
- 18. "4th Baby Mama (prelude)"

=== Russ - CHOMP 2 ===
- 04. "Salute" (featuring Westside Gunn & Styles P)

=== Ultra Beast - Put 'Cha Teeth on It ===
- 12. "Something About You" (featuring Scar)

=== Brittney Howard - Jaime ===
- 13. "He Loves Me (9th Wonder Remix)" (featuring Common)

=== Anthony Hamilton - Love Is the New Black ===
- 03. "Real Love" (featuring Rick Ross)

== 2022 ==
=== Phife Dawg - Forever ===
- 02. "Only a Coward"

== 2023 ==
=== Brandee Younger - Brand New Life ===
- 06. "Windmills of Your Life"

=== Dinner Party - Enigmatic Society ===
- 02. "Breathe" (featuring Arin Ray)
- 05. "For Granted" (featuring Arin Ray)
- 07. "Can't Go" (featuring Phoelix)
- 09. "Love Love" (featuring Arin Ray)

=== Rueben Vincent - Love Is War ===
- 05. "2ime Flies"

=== Reason ===
- "The Soul pt. 3"

=== Russ - Chomp 2.5 ===
- 06. "Perfectionist"

=== Charlie Smarts & DJ Ill Digitz - Charlietape ===
- 13. "Outbreak"
- 14. "Mezzanine"

== 2024 ==
=== Swank & King Draft - Vice City ===
- 03. "Music Man"
- 06. "Like a Jungle"

=== The Musalini - Active & Attractive ===
- 05. "All Love"

=== The Musalini - Tru Player In The Game ===
- 10. "Good Convo" (featuring G4 Jag)

=== Ab-Soul - Soul Burger ===
- 04. "California Dream" (featuring Vince Staples and Kamm Carson) (co-produced with Low the Great)

=== Reuben Vincent - AS IF NOBODY'S LISTENING...... ===
- 06. "SPIRITUAL WARFARE"
- 09. "IRON JOHN"

=== King Magnetic - Third Time's the Charm ===
- "Family Discussion"

=== Heather Victoria ===
- "Fool Me"

== 2025 ==
=== Smif n Wessun - Infinity ===
- 07. "Enjoy Ya Life"
- 08. "Shine"

== Singles produced by 9th Wonder ==
- 2002: "Whatever You Say" (Little Brother)
- 2004: "Bad Man" (Murs)
- 2005: "Girl" (Destiny's Child)
- 2005: "Lovin' It" (Little Brother feat. Joe Scudda)
- 2006: "Here We Come" (Bootcamp Clik)
- 2008: "Honey" (Erykah Badu)
- 2008: "Go All Out" (Buckshot feat. Carlitta Durand)
- 2009: "The Beautiful Decay" (Skyzoo)
- 2010: "The Problem Is" (Murs feat. Sick Jacken & Uncle Chucc)
- 2010: "Easy To Fly" (Skyzoo feat. Carlitta Durand)
- 2010: "Slow Down" (David Banner feat. Heather Victoria)
- 2010: "Be With You" (David Banner feat. Ludacris & Marsha Ambrosius) (Produced with W. Campbell & David Banner)
- 2010: "Genius" (Actual Proof)
- 2010: "Woop Woop (Stand Back)" (Big Remo feat. Ricky Ruckus & 9thMatic)
- 2011: "You & Me" (Tyler Woods feat. Heather Victoria)
- 2011: "Black Girl Jedi" (Rapsody feat. Heather Victoria)
- 2011: "Not Here Anymore" (Phonte feat. Elzhi)
- 2011: "Band Practice Pt. II" (9th Wonder feat. Phonte & Median)

== See also ==
- It's A Wonderful World Music Group
