= For Real (disambiguation) =

For Real is a 1990s American band.

For Real may also refer to:

== Film and television ==
- For Real (film), a 2009 Indian film
- "For Real" (Tanner '88 episode), a 1988 political mockumentary

== Music ==
- For Real! (Hampton Hawes album), recorded 1958, released 1961
- For Real! (Ruben and the Jets album), 1973
- For Real, a song by Tricky from Juxtapose, 1999
- For Real?, an album by Toshinobu Kubota, 2006
- "For Real" (Athena song), Turkish Eurovision contest song, 2004
- "For Real" (Okkervil River song), 2005
- For Real, a song by Lil Uzi Vert from Luv Is Rage 2
- For Real, a song by Tom Petty from The Best of Everything

== See also ==
- F'Real, an album by Murs, 1997
- 4 Real (disambiguation)
