= Varsity Blues =

Varsity Blues may refer to:

- Varsity Blues (film), a 1999 film starring James Van Der Beek
- Varsity Blues (EP), a 2002 EP by Murs
- Toronto Varsity Blues, the sports teams of the University of Toronto, Canada
- 2019 college admissions bribery scandal, a 2019 U.S. college admissions bribery scandal and subsequent federal investigation named after the film
  - Operation Varsity Blues: The College Admissions Scandal, a 2021 documentary about the scandal

== See also ==
- Blue (university sport), an award for competition at the highest level
