= The Final Adventure =

Studio album by Murs and 9th Wonder
- Released: November 13, 2012
- Recorded: 2011–2012
- Studio: Brightlady Studios (Raleigh, NC)
- Genre: Hip-hop
- Length: 37:01
- Label: Jamla
- Producer: 9th Wonder

Murs and 9th Wonder chronology
| Fornever (2010) | The Final Adventure (2012) | Brighter Daze (2015) |

Murs chronology
| This Generation (2012) | The Final Adventure (2012) | ¡MursDay! (2014) |

9th Wonder chronology
| The Wonder Years (2011) | The Final Adventure / The Solution (2012) | Indie 500 (2015) |

The Final Adventure is the fifth collaborative studio album by American California-based rapper Murs and North Carolina-based producer 9th Wonder. It was released on November 13, 2012, via Jamla Records. Recording sessions took place at Brightlady Studios in Raleigh. It features a lone guest appearance from Rapsody. The album debuted at number 34 on the Top R&B/Hip-Hop Albums, number 22 on the Top Rap Albums and number 50 on the Independent Albums charts in the United States.

== Critical reception ==
Professional ratings
Review scores
| Source | Rating |
|---|---|
| AllMusic | 4/5 stars |
| HipHopDX | 4/5 |
| XXL | XL (4/5) |

The Final Adventure was met with positive reviews from three mainstream publications, receiving an average four-out-of-five score. AllMusic's David Jeffries praised the album, declaring: "it's what they've done so well since Murs 3:16, and if this really is The Final Adventure, it is what Murs would call 'a damn shame'". Andres Tardio of HipHopDX noted: "it's clear that Murs and 9th Wonder had a task here: finishing their saga as strongly as they started it. With The Final Adventure, the duo does just that, crafting an album that speaks on a variety of topics over soulful instrumentation, much like on 3:16". Christopher Minaya of XXL stated: "for the curtain call to their majestic run of collaborative LPs, Murs and 9th Wonder assemble the congruous The Final Adventure, which underlines Murs' words with 9th's music as harmoniously as ever before".

== Track listing ==
All tracks are written by Nicholas Carter and Patrick Douthit, except track 1 is written with Marlanna Evans, and track 4 is written with Christopher Tyson.

| No. | Title | Length |
|---|---|---|
| 1. | "Get Together" (featuring Rapsody) | 2:46 |
| 2. | "Whatuptho" | 3:35 |
| 3. | "Funeral for a Killer" | 4:09 |
| 4. | "Baby Girl (Holding Hands)" | 3:20 |
| 5. | "Walk Like a Woman" | 6:12 |
| 6. | "Tale of Two Cities" | 3:49 |
| 7. | "Dance with Me" | 3:27 |
| 8. | "Better Way" | 3:36 |
| 9. | "Wherever You Are" | 2:43 |
| 10. | "It's Over" | 3:24 |
| Total length: | | 37:01 |

== Personnel ==
- Nicholas "Murs" Carter – songwriter, vocals, executive producer
- Marlanna "Rapsody" Evans – songwriter & vocals (track 1)
- Patrick "9th Wonder" Douthit – songwriter, producer, recording, executive producer
- Christopher "Khrysis" Tyson – songwriter (track 4), mixing, mastering
- Marco Oliva – photography
- Warren Hendricks – design, layout

== Charts ==
| Chart (2012) | Peak position |
|---|---|
| US Top R&B/Hip-Hop Albums (Billboard) | 34 |
| US Top Rap Albums (Billboard) | 22 |
| US Independent Albums (Billboard) | 50 |
