= The Wonder Years (9th Wonder album) =

Studio album by 9th Wonder
- Released: September 27, 2011
- Studios: Khrysis' Crib; The Peanut Gallery (Raleigh, North Carolina); Brightlady Studios (Raleigh, North Carolina); Record Plant (Los Angeles, California)
- Genres: Underground hip-hop; Alternative hip-hop
- Length: 61:51
- Label: It's a Wonderful World Music Group
- Producer: 9th Wonder

9th Wonder chronology
9th's Opus: It's a Wonderful World Music Group Vol. 1 (2010)	The Wonder Years (2011)	The Solution (2017)

Professional ratings
Aggregate scores
Source	Rating
Metacritic	87/100
Review scores
Source	Rating
AllMusic	4/5 stars
HipHopDX	4/5
RapReviews	8/10
XXL	4/5

The Wonder Years is the fourth studio album by American record producer 9th Wonder. It was released on September 27, 2011 through his own label It's a Wonderful World Music Group. Recording sessions took place at Khrysis' Crib, at the Peanut Gallery in Raleigh, North Carolina, at Brightlady Studios, and at Record Plant in Los Angeles. Production was handled entirely by 9th Wonder himself, who also served as executive producer. It features guest appearances from Terrace Martin, Median, Phonte, Actual Proof, Big Remo, Bird & The Midnight Falcons, Blu, Erykah Badu, Fashawn, GQ, Halo, Heather Victoria, Holly Weerd, Kendrick Lamar, Khrysis, King Mez, Mac Miller, Marsha Ambrosius, Masta Killa, MeLa Machinko, Murs, Problem, Raekwon, Rapsody, Skyzoo, Talib Kweli, Tanya Morgan, Thee Tom Hardy and Warren G. The album peaked at number 76 on the Billboard 200 in the United States.

== Overview ==
It was originally scheduled to be released in 2008 through Asylum Records, but it was delayed to undisclosed reasons. The songs originally recorded for the album were leaked such as "Star" featuring his former group Little Brother, "Ms. Diva" featuring Tyler Woods and Talib Kweli and "Only Knew" featuring Tyler Woods and Styles P.

== Track listing ==
=== Standard edition ===
No.	Title	Writer(s)	Length
1.	"Make It Big (Intro)" (featuring Khrysis)	Patrick Douthit; Christopher Tyson	5:14
2.	"Band Practice Pt. 2" (featuring Phonte and Median)	Douthit; Phonte Coleman; James Livingston	1:59
3.	"Enjoy (West Coastin')" (featuring Warren G, Murs and Kendrick Lamar)	Douthit; Warren Griffin III; Nicholas Carter; Kendrick Duckworth	3:23
4.	"Streets of Music" (featuring Tanya Morgan & Enigma of Actual Proof)	Douthit; Devon Callender; Donald W. Freeman; I. Hendricks	3:06
5.	"Hearing the Melody" (featuring Skyzoo, Fashawn and King Mez)	Douthit; Gregory Taylor; Santiago Leyva; Morris W. Ricks II	4:04
6.	"Loyalty" (featuring Masta Killa and Halo)	Douthit; Elgin Turner; Shakeer Fullenweider	4:15
7.	"Now I'm Being Cool" (featuring MeLa Machinko and Median)	Douthit; Larissa Conner; Livingston	4:09
8.	"Never Stop Loving You" (featuring Terrace Martin and Talib Kweli)	Douthit; Terrace Martin; Talib Greene	4:00
9.	"Piranhas" (featuring Blu and Sundown)	Douthit; Johnson Barnes; A. Holmes	3:19
10.	"Peanut Butter & Jelly" (featuring Marsha Ambrosius)	Douthit; Marsha Ambrosius	4:04
11.	"One Night" (featuring Terrace Martin, Phonte, Bird & The Midnight Falcons)	Douthit; Martin; Coleman	4:22
12.	"Your Smile" (featuring Holly Weerd and Thee Tom Hardy)	Douthit; T. Carter; T. Hardison	3:49
13.	"No Pretending" (featuring Raekwon and Big Remo)	Douthit; Corey Woods; Rashad Cash	4:00
14.	"20 Feet Tall (Remix)" (featuring Erykah Badu and Rapsody)	Douthit; Erica Wright; Marlanna Evans	4:20
15.	"That's Love" (featuring Mac Miller and Heather Victoria)	Douthit; Malcolm McCormick; Heather Graham	3:38
16.	"A Star U R" (featuring Terrace Martin, Problem and GQ)	Douthit; Martin; Quentin Thomas	4:19
Total length:			1:01:51

=== iTunes deluxe edition ===
1. "Make It Big (Remix)" featuring Big Remo & Kryhsis
2. "Band Practice Pt. 2" featuring Phonte and Median
3. "Enjoy (West Coastin')" featuring Warren G, Murs and Kendrick Lamar
4. "Streets of Music" featuring Tanya Morgan and Enigma of Actual Proof
5. "Hearing the Melody" featuring Fashawn, King Mez and Skyzoo
6. "Loyalty" featuring Masta Killa and Halo
7. "Now I'm Being Cool" featuring MeLa Machinko and King Mez
8. "Never Stop Loving You" featuring Terrace Martin and Talib Kweli
9. "Piranhas" featuring Blu and Sundown of Actual Proof
10. "Peanut Butter & Jelly" featuring Marsha Ambrosius
11. "One Night" featuring Terrace Martin, Phonte, and Bird and The Midnight Falcons
12. "Your Smile" featuring Holly Weerd and Thee Tom Hardy
13. "No Pretending" featuring Raekwon and Big Remo
14. "20 Feet Tall (Remix)" featuring Erykah Badu and Rapsody
15. "That's Love" featuring Mac Miller and Heather Victoria
16. "A Star U R" featuring GQ, Terrace Martin, & Problem
17. "Band Practice" featuring Phonte
18. "Me and My Nuh" featuring Teedra Moses
19. "Base For Your Face" featuring Lil B, Jean Grae and Phonte

== Charts ==
Chart (2011)	Peak position
US Billboard 200	76
US Top R&B/Hip-Hop Albums (Billboard)	12
US Top Rap Albums (Billboard)	10
US Independent Albums (Billboard)	12
