= 4 Real (disambiguation) =

4 Real is a 2003 album by Japanese-born American singer Crystal Kay

4 Real may also refer to:

- 4Real, a 2008 American TV series on MTV Canada
- "4 Real", a song by Avril Lavigne from Goodbye Lullaby
- "4 Real", a song by YNW Melly from I Am You
- 4 Real, a phrase the musician Richey Edwards, of Manic Street Preachers, cut into his arm in 1991

== See also ==
- 4Real 4Real, a 2019 album by YG
- For Real (disambiguation)
