= Captain California =

Studio album by Murs
- Released: March 10, 2017
- Recorded: 2016–17
- Studio: Studio 1 Zero (Los Angeles, CA); Grill Recording Studios (Emeryville, CA)
- Genre: Hip-hop
- Length: 44:56
- Label: Strange Music
- Producer: Anthony Cruz; ARCiTEC; Buttercream Bob; DJ Fresh; DJ Rek; K.-R.O.K.; MOD; Mr. Len; Seven; Wax Roof

Murs chronology
Brighter Daze (2015)	Captain California (2017)	A Strange Journey into the Unimaginable (2018)

Captain California is the tenth studio album by American rapper Murs. It was released on March 10, 2017, via Strange Music. Recording sessions took place at Studio 1 Zero in Los Angeles and Grill Recording Studios in Emeryville. Production was handled by Michael "Seven" Summers, Wax Roof, Anthony Cruz, ARCiTEC, Buttercream Bob, DJ Fresh, DJ Rek, K.-R.O.K., MOD and Mr. Len, with Travis O'Guin serving as executive producer. It features guest appearances from Beleaf, Big Too Big, Curtiss King, Krizz Kaliko, Reverie and Rexx Life Raj. In the United States, the album debuted at number 85 on the Top Current Album Sales and number 22 on the Independent Albums charts.

== Critical reception ==
Professional ratings
Aggregate scores
Source	Rating
Metacritic	82/100
Review scores
Source	Rating
AllMusic	4/5 stars
Exclaim!	8/10
HipHopDX	3.8/5
Noisey	(3-star Honorable Mention)
XXL	4/5

Captain California was met with universal acclaim from music critics. At Metacritic, which assigns a normalized rating out of 100 to reviews from mainstream publications, the album received an average score of 82 based on four reviews.

AllMusic's Neil Z. Yeung praised the album, stating: "while the album might be "business as usual" for Murs, that's purely a good thing. Two decades into the game and he's endearing, insightful, and sharp as ever". Anya Zoledziowski of Exclaim! concluded: "overall, Murs' tenth solo album showcases why he's had a long career with a dedicated fan base, and adds another pin to the emcee's decorated lapel". Scott Glaysher of XXL wrote: "of course, he isn't breaking totally new ground but still manages to make Captain California one of his best projects to date. At no point on this 45-minute rap fest does Murs ever come across as unsure, unauthentic or unaware of who is he is as a rapper or man". Kyle Eustice of HipHopDX wrote: "while it may be a bit disjointed at times, Captain California reels in his superhero status as a gifted storyteller and proficient rhyme executor, making his home at Strange Music the idyllic place".

== Track listing ==
No.	Title	Writer(s)	Producer(s)	Length
1.	"Lemon Juice" (featuring Curtiss King)	Nicholas Carter; D'wan Howard; Michael Summers	Seven	4:04
2.	"Shakespeare on the Low" (featuring Rexx Life Raj)	Carter; Faraji Omar Wright; Will S. Rice	Wax Roof	3:22
3.	"GBKW (God Bless Kanye West)"	Carter; Rodney L. Gilcreast	K.-R.O.K.	3:22
4.	"Colossus"	Carter; RaShann Chambliss	DJ Rek	3:10
5.	"Another Round" (featuring Krizz Kaliko)	Carter; Samuel Watson; Summers	Seven	3:22
6.	"Xmas and Thanksgiving"	Carter; Marqus Brown	DJ Fresh	2:32
7.	"Summer"	Carter; Ahmad Miller	MOD	2:38
8.	"1000 Suns"	Carter; Summers	Seven	3:18
9.	"One Uh Those Days" (featuring Reverie)	Carter; Jordan Elizabeth Caceres; Leonard Smythe	Mr. Len	3:29
10.	"G Is for Gentrify"	Carter; Rice	Wax Roof	3:39
11.	"Animals Damnit" (featuring Beleaf)	Carter; Glen David Henry; Ian A. Desdune II	Buttercream Bob	4:54
12.	"Ay Caramba"	Carter; Anthony Cruz; Charles Christian IV; Jared Leckey	Anthony Cruz; ARCiTEC	3:16
13.	"Wanna Be High" (featuring Big Too Big)	Carter; Rice	Wax Roof	3:50
Total length:				44:56

== Personnel ==
- Nicholas "Murs" Carter – vocals
- D'wan "Curtiss King" Howard – additional vocals (track 1)
- Faraji Omar "Rexx Life Raj" Wright – additional vocals (track 2)
- Samuel "Krizz Kaliko" Watson – additional vocals (track 5)
- Jordan Elizabeth "Reverie" Caceres – additional vocals (track 9)
- Bishop Carter – additional vocals (track 10)
- Glen "Beleaf" Henry – additional vocals (track 11)
- Krizia Bajos – additional vocals (track 11)
- Big Too Big – additional vocals (track 13)
- Michael "Seven" Summers – producer (tracks: 1, 5, 8)
- Will S. "Wax Roof" Rice – producer (tracks: 2, 10, 13)
- Rodney "K.-R.O.K." Gilcreast – producer (track 3)
- RaShann "DJ Rek" Chambliss – producer (track 4)
- Marqus "DJ Fresh" Brown – producer (track 6)
- Ahmad "MOD" Miller – producer (track 7)
- Leonard "Mr. Len" Smythe – producer (track 9)
- Buttercream Bob – producer (track 11)
- Anthony Cruz – producer (track 12)
- ARCiTEC – producer (track 12)
- Eric Denniston – recording (tracks: 1, 3–13)
- Max Perry – recording (track 2)
- Ben Cybulsky – mixing
- Tom Baker – mastering
- Travis O'Guin – executive producer, A&R
- Dave Weiner – A&R
- Mark Brown – A&R

== Charts ==
Chart (2017)	Peak position
US Top Current Album Sales (Billboard)	85
US Independent Albums (Billboard)	22
US R&B/Hip-Hop Album Sales (Billboard)	19
