= Murs Rules the World =

Studio album by Murs
- Released: October 10, 2000
- Genre: Hip-hop
- Label: Veritech Records
- Producer: Mum's The Word; Oso; Diverse; Javier Mosley; Gandalf

Murs chronology
Good Music (1999)	Murs Rules the World (2000)	Murs Is My Best Friend (2001)

Murs Rules the World is the third solo album by American hip hop artist Murs. Most of the tracks are produced by Mum's The Word. It was released on October 10, 2000.

OU Daily noted that it was his best album up to that point.

== Track listing ==
#	Title	Producer(s)	Performer(s)
1	Murs Rules the World	Oso	Murs
2	Living Legend	Mum's The Word	Murs
3	I Hate Your Boyfriend	Mum's The Word	Murs
4	All Day	Mum's The Word	Murs
5	Making Music	Diverse	Murs
6	Slob My Nob	Oso	Murs
7	Cha Cha Cha Interlude	Mum's The Word	Murs
8	Way Tight	Mum's The Word	Murs
9	In the Zone	Mum's The Word	Murs
10	I Did It Like That	Mum's The Word	Murs
11	You Want My Move? (2002)	Javier Mosley	Murs
12	Like What	Gandalf	Murs
13	Sucks to Be You	Mum's The Word	Murs
14	Way Tight Rmx	Mum's The Word	Murs
