= Murray's Revenge =

Studio album by Murs and 9th Wonder
- Released: March 21, 2006
- Recorded: 2005
- Genre: Hip-hop
- Length: 32:03
- Label: Record Collection
- Producer: 9th Wonder

Murs and 9th Wonder chronology
| Murs 3:16: The 9th Edition (2004) | Murray's Revenge (2006) | Sweet Lord (2008) |

9th Wonder chronology
| Chemistry (2005) | Murray's Revenge (2006) | Cloud 9: The 3 Day High (2006) |

Murray's Revenge is the second collaborative studio album by Californian rapper Murs and North Carolina-based producer 9th Wonder. It was released on March 21, 2006 via Record Collection. Entirely produced by 9th Wonder, it features guest appearances from Joe Scudda and Big Pooh. Music videos were released for the songs "L.A.", "Yesterday & Today" and "Murray's Revenge".

In the United States, the album peaked at number 166 on the Billboard 200, number 70 on the Top R&B/Hip-Hop Albums, number 15 on the Independent Albums and number 4 on the Heatseekers Albums charts. As of July 2008, it has sold 46,000 copies in the US alone.

== Critical reception ==
Professional ratings
Aggregate scores
| Source | Rating |
|---|---|
| Metacritic | 79/100 |
Review scores
| Source | Rating |
| AllHipHop | 4/5 stars |
| AllMusic | 4/5 stars |
| Pitchfork | 7/10 |
| PopMatters | 8/10 |
| Prefix | 4/5 stars |
| RapReviews | 7.5/10 |
| Rolling Stone | 3/5 stars |
| Stylus | C+ |
| The A.V. Club | B+ |
| The Village Voice | (1-star Honorable Mention) |

Murray's Revenge was met with generally favorable reviews from music critics. At Metacritic, which assigns a normalized rating out of 100 to reviews from mainstream publications, the album received an average score of 79 based on twelve reviews.

Nathan Rabin of The A.V. Club gave the album a "B+" rating, saying "on Revenge, Murs and 9th Wonder wisely stick to the winning formula that paid such rich creative dividends on 3:16--strong song concepts, minimal guest appearances, a brisk running time, dope beats, and lyrics both smart and smartass". AllMusic's Marisa Brown called it "a good album that should please fans of any type of hip-hop". Michael Frauenhofer of PopMatters noted "the only problem, then, is that Murray's Revenge simply lacks the instant-classic feel of 3:16". Adrian Covert of Prefix wrote: "there is a lot to be said for good chemistry. Nothing about this album is jaw dropping, but Murs and 9th play off each other so well throughout this short but sweet album that I don't really care". Tom Doggett of RapReviews stated: "Murray's Revenge clocks in at a meager thirty-three minutes, which is simply too short for a full-length album.... Regardless, he is back, and better than ever". Peter Macia of Pitchfork named it "one of the better gang-unrelated and Dre-unaffiliated records to come from the West Coast since Murs' last one". Christian Hoard of Rolling Stone wrote: "Murs' sixth album sets his quick-tongued command over soul-flecked funk".

In his mixed review for Stylus magazine, Andrew Iliff resumed: "Murray's Revenge feels tired, the work of a mind either distracted or unwilling to commit to any one thing".

== Track listing ==
| No. | Title | Writer(s) | Length |
|---|---|---|---|
| 1. | "Murs Day" | Nicholas Carter; Patrick Douthit | 1:54 |
| 2. | "Murray's Law" | Carter; Douthit | 2:39 |
| 3. | "Silly Girl" (featuring Joe Scudda) | Carter; Joseph Griffen; Douthit | 3:46 |
| 4. | "Barbershop" (featuring Rapper Big Pooh) | Carter; Thomas Jones III; Douthit | 4:28 |
| 5. | "Yesterday & Today" | Carter; Douthit | 3:35 |
| 6. | "Dreamchaser" | Carter; Douthit | 2:34 |
| 7. | "L.A." | Carter; Douthit; Lloyd Ferguson; Fitzroy Simpson; Donald Shaw | 2:49 |
| 8. | "Love & Appreciate" | Carter; Douthit | 3:12 |
| 9. | "D.S.W.G. (Dark Skinned White Girls)" | Carter; Douthit | 4:27 |
| 10. | "Murray's Revenge" | Carter; Douthit | 2:42 |
| Total length: | | | 32:03 |

Sample credits

- Track 7 contains a sample from the song "Atlas" by the Mighty Diamonds.

== Personnel ==
- Nick "Murs" Carter – vocals
- Joseph "Joe Scudda" Griffen – vocals (track 3)
- Thomas "Rapper Big Pooh" Jones III – vocals (track 4)
- Patrick "9th Wonder" Douthit – producer, recording, mixing
- Gabriela López – art direction, design
- Dan Monick – art direction, additional photography
- Mike Piscitelli – cover photography, design
- Paul Gomez – A&R
- Ryan Whalley – A&R

== Charts ==
| Chart (2008) | Peak position |
|---|---|
| US Billboard 200 | 166 |
| US Top R&B/Hip-Hop Albums (Billboard) | 70 |
| US Independent Albums (Billboard) | 15 |
| US Heatseekers Albums (Billboard) | 4 |
