= It's a Wonderful World Music Group =

Jamla Records / It's a Wonderful World Music Group
- Founded: 2008
- Founder: 9th Wonder
- Distributors: Empire; Roc Nation
- Genre: Hip-hop; R&B
- Country of origin: U.S.
- Location: Raleigh, North Carolina, U.S.
- Official website: jamlarecords.com

It's a Wonderful World Music Group, also known as Jamla Records, a play on Tamla Records, is an independent record label, founded by hip-hop producer 9th Wonder in 2008.

== History ==
9th Wonder founded It's a Wonderful World Music Group shortly after leaving the group Little Brother. The idea of starting his own label was given to him by a fiance of one of the members of his production team. The company initially had distribution from Warner Music Group under Asylum and Warner Bros. Records. However, creative differences between 9th and Asylum Records were the primary delay behind the release of his 2011 album The Wonder Years. He then left the company and sought distribution from Traffic Entertainment Group and The Orchard for the physical release of It's a Wonderful World's first offering, Big Remo's 2010 album Entrapment and his long-delayed The Wonder Years.

In January 2008, 9th Wonder initially announced plans to start two independent record labels, Jamla and The Academy, under the It's a Wonderful World imprint. The names of the two labels referenced his background: The Academy referred to his position as a college professor, while Jamla was a nod to Motown Records' original name Tamla Records. Jamla originally consisted of Brooklyn rapper Skyzoo, 2005–06 North Carolina Tar Heels men's basketball team player Quentin Thomas – better known as the moniker GQ, rapper Rapsody, R&B singer Tyler Woods, and hardcore rapper Big Remo. The Academy consisted of rapper HaLo, singer Heather Victoria, Thee Tom Hardy, North Carolinian duo Actual Proof, TP & The Away Team. The Academy artists were later folded into the Jamla label. In 2012, It's a Wonderful Music Group obtained distribution from its current distributor, Empire Distribution. The first album released under the deal was Rapsody's debut The Idea of Beautiful. Jamla also had a short-lived joint venture deal with Buckshot's Duck Down Music to distribute albums by Skyzoo and The Away Team.

In July 2010, 9th Wonder officially debuted his production team for IWWMG. The Soul Council consists of Khrysis, E. Jones, Fatin "10" Horton, Ka$h Don't Make Beats, AMP, Eric G., & 9th Wonder himself. In August 2014, 9th Wonder announced Nottz as being the newest member of The Soul Council. In November 2015, Hi-Tek was announced as the newest member of The Soul Council.

Aside from 9th Wonder being the president and CEO, other members of Jamla hold executive positions as well. The Away Team member Sean Boog was named as label manager in 2013. In April 2015, recording engineer Young Guru was named as the Director of Operations. The Soul Council producer AMP is also the label's artwork director, while Khrysis is the label's in-house recording engineer as well as mixing and mastering engineer.

Roc Nation signed Rapsody in 2016 and Reuben Vincent in 2021.

== Jamla Records ==
- 9th Wonder – CEO
- Kash Norville – President
- Tia Watlington – Vice-president
- Young Guru – Director Of Operations
- E. Jones – Director of A&R

=== Current artists ===
- Heather Victoria (2010–present)
- Reuben Vincent (2017–present)
- Swank & King Draft (2018–present)
- The Musalini (2022–present)
- Sweata (2023–present)
- Eli Tha Don (2025–present)

=== Past artists ===
- Skyzoo (2009–2012)
- Tyler Woods
- TP
- Big Remo (2008–2015)
- Actual Proof
- Thee Tom Hardy
- The Away Team
- HaLo
- Add-2
- GQ (2009–2021)
- Ian Kelly (2018–2021)
- Rapsody (2008–2022)

=== The Soul Council ===
The in-house production team for Jamla Records:

- 9th Wonder
- Khrysis
- Eric G.
- E. Jones
- Ka$h
- AMP
- Nottz
- Sndtrak
- JADA

== Discography ==
=== Notable albums ===
- 2009: Skyzoo – The Salvation (Jamla/Duck Down)
- 2011: 9th Wonder – The Wonder Years
- 2011: The Away Team – Scars & Stripes (Jamla/Duck Down)
- 2012: Rapsody – The Idea of Beautiful
- 2012: 9th Wonder & Buckshot – The Solution (Jamla/Duck Down)
- 2012: Murs & 9th Wonder – The Final Adventure
- 2015: Murs & 9th Wonder – Brighter Daze
- 2017: Rapsody – Laila's Wisdom (Jamla/Roc Nation)
- 2019: Rapsody – Eve (Jamla/Roc Nation)
- 2023: Reuben Vincent - Love is War (Jamla/Roc Nation)
- 2024: Rapsody - Please Don't Cry (Jamla/Roc Nation)

== See also ==
- 9th Wonder production discography
- Khrysis production discography
