= The White Mandingos =

- Origin: Woodstock, New York
- Genre: Rap rock
- Years active: 2012–present
- Label: Fat Beats
- Members: Murs; Darryl Jenifer; Sacha Jenkins

The White Mandingos are a rock supergroup from Woodstock, New York consisting of rapper Murs, producer Sacha Jenkins and bass guitarist Darryl Jenifer.

== Biography ==
The band was formed in late 2012 when Jenkins met up at Jenifer's house in Woodstock to discover if there was anything in common between their respective favourite music genres. They considered their initial collaborations unimpressive, so Jenkins suggested collaborating with Murs, who provided lyrics.

Their first album, The Ghetto Is Tryna Kill Me was released in June 2013, and followed with a short tour of the eastern United States, including gigs in New York's New Museum, Boston and Washington DC. The album is a concept album around Tyrone White, a young black man from a New York City housing project, who subsequently obtains a recording contract and gets a white girlfriend. Jenifer and Jenkins have described the album Tommy by The Who as an important influence. Reviewing the album, Baltimore City Paper's Baynard Woods thought the group "actually manage to do service to punk and hip hop" and praised the band's sense of humour, particularly the music video for their first single, "My First White Girl". Washington City Paper's Marcus J Moore described the video for the group's "Warn A Brotha" as "a cool ode to skateboarding".

== Music style and influences ==
They have described their influences as hip-hop, West Coast rap, The Isley Brothers, Led Zeppelin and reggae.

The band's music has been classified as rap rock. Jenkins rejects that term, stating "I don't like 'rap rock' at all. Like I hate it. I think it's — it's terrible!" and has explained that "what we've come together to do is just an extension of all of our experiences as black men, but we're not just limited to being black". Murs has complained that black music hasn't evolved since the 1980s, and that the music industry places no expectations on black rock groups being successful. Unlike many new bands, Jenkins places little importance on social media, though he did praise Wikipedia, saying "Wikipedia is nice. It’s a lot of nice people coming together sharing information – no one’s making money. Shout out to Wikipedia."

== Discography ==
- The Ghetto Is Tryna Kill Me (2013)
