= Sweet Lord =

Studio album by Murs & 9th Wonder
- Released: July 23, 2008
- Recorded: Early 2007
- Genre: Hip hop
- Length: 32:23
- Label: Record Collection
- Producer: 9th Wonder

Murs chronology
| Murray's Revenge (2006) | Sweet Lord (2008) | Murs for President (2008) |

Professional ratings
Review scores
| Source | Rating |
|---|---|
| PopMatters | 7/10 stars |
| RapReviews.com | 8/10 stars |

Sweet Lord is the third collaboration album from California rapper Murs (of the Living Legends) and North Carolina producer 9th Wonder (formerly of Little Brother). Like their other collaborations the album features ten songs, all produced by 9th Wonder, and is less than 40 minutes long. Murs stated in an online video that the album would be released for free through the internet as a "present" to his fans but only if they promise to actually purchase his album Murs for President and other albums he does with 9th Wonder.

== Track listing ==
| No. | Title | Length |
|---|---|---|
| 1. | "Intro" | 3:10 |
| 2. | "Are You Ready?" | 3:50 |
| 3. | "Nina Ross" | 3:58 |
| 4. | "Free" | 3:31 |
| 5. | "And I Love It" | 3:54 |
| 6. | "Pusshhhhhh" | 3:06 |
| 7. | "It's for Real" | 3:16 |
| 8. | "Marry Me" | 2:51 |
| 9. | "Love the Way" (featuring Tyler Woods) | 3:16 |
| 10. | "Murs Inatra" | 3:31 |
