= This Generation (Murs and Fashawn album) =

Studio album by Murs and Fashawn
- Released: September 25, 2012
- Recorded: 2012
- Genre: Hip-hop
- Length: 45:03
- Label: Duck Down
- Producer: Beatnick; K-Salaam

Murs chronology
Love & Rockets Vol. 1: The Transformation (2011)	This Generation (2012)	The Final Adventure (2012)

Singles from This Generation
- 1. "Slash Gordan" Released: August 29, 2012; 2. "This Generation" Released: September 25, 2012; 3. "'64 Impala" Released: February 14, 2013

This Generation is a collaborative studio album by American rappers Murs and Fashawn. It was released on September 25, 2012, through Duck Down Music. Produced entirely by Beatnick and K-Salaam, it features guest appearances from Adrian and Krondon. Music videos were filmed for the singles "Slash Gordan", "This Generation", and "64 Impala".

In the United States, the album debuted at number 164 on the Billboard 200, number 22 on the Top R&B/Hip-Hop Albums, number 17 on the Top Rap Albums and number 38 on the Independent Albums charts.

== Background and development ==
Prior to the album's creation, West Coast rappers Murs and Fashawn would frequently bump into each other on the road, although they had never worked with each other. As Murs began to plan out a new project with producers Beatnick and K-Salaam, the three of them expressed interest in doing a full collaboration album with Fashawn.

Initially, the album was going to be a double extended play, with Murs taking half of the beats and Fashawn taking the other half. However, as the two began to work closely together, the project evolved into a more collaborative effort, with both artists vibing off each other's creative process.

== Critical reception ==
Professional ratings
Aggregate scores
Source	Rating
Metacritic	73/100
Review scores
Source	Rating
AllMusic	4/5 stars
Consequence of Sound	C−
HipHopDX	4/5
PopMatters	6/10
The Skinny	3/5 stars
XXL	4/5

This Generation was met with generally favorable reviews from music critics. At Metacritic, which assigns a normalized rating out of 100 to reviews from mainstream publications, the album received an average score of 73 based on nine reviews.

AllMusic's Fred Thomas praised the project, calling it "an album that's already brimming over with personality thanks to the chemistry between the two rhyme stylists and their ability to bring out the most inventive sides of one another". Edwin Ortiz of HipHopDX stated: "Murs and Fashawn forge an exceptional chemistry on This Generation that more importantly doesn't compromise their stylistic individuality". Christopher Minaya of XXL resumed: "the two feed off each other well, resulting in good music with a message, more often than not".

In mixed reviews, Michael Madden of Consequence wrote: "while the highs ("64 Impala", "Slash Gordan") could be higher, the lows aren't actually all that low. As far as full-length rap collabos go, you could do much worse than this". Adam Maylone of PopMatters concluded: "it's not groundbreaking, it's not shocking, but it is solid, fun music. It may not be a classic, but it's damn sure a good soundtrack for those warm, sunny days".

== Track listing ==
No.	Title	Length
1.	"Just Begun"	3:27
2.	"'64 Impala"	4:05
3.	"Reina de Barrio (Ghetto Queen)" (featuring Adrian)	3:16
4.	"Stone Cold"	3:14
5.	"Yellow Tape" (featuring Krondon)	2:50
6.	"Peace Treaty"	3:41
7.	"And It Goes"	3:24
8.	"Slash Gordan"	3:11
9.	"Heartbreaks & Handcuffs"	3:16
10.	"This Generation" (featuring Adrian)	3:25
11.	"Future Love"	3:14
12.	"The Other Side"	8:00
Total length:		45:03

== Personnel ==
- Nicholas "Murs" Carter – vocals
- Santiago "Fashawn" Leyva – vocals
- Adrian – vocals (tracks: 3, 10)
- Marvin "Krondon" Jones – vocals (track 5)
- Nick "Beatnick" Phillips – producer
- Kayvon "K-Salaam" Sarfehjooy – producer
- Isaac Romero – mixing, mastering
- Kenyatta "Buckshot" Blake – associate executive producer
- Drew "Dru-Ha" Friedman – associate executive producer
- Van Styles – photography
- Jefroe Grell – artwork
- Jacqueline Shao – additional artwork
- Skrilla – additional artwork
- Noah Friedman – project coordinator

== Charts ==
Chart (2012)	Peak position
US Billboard 200	164
US Top R&B/Hip-Hop Albums (Billboard)	22
US Top Rap Albums (Billboard)	17
US Independent Albums (Billboard)	38
