= Varsity Blues (EP) =

EP by Murs
- Released: 2002
- Genre: Hip hop
- Length: 20:10
- Label: self-released
- Producers: Mum's the Word, Belief, Ant, Bones, Justin Martin, Black Panther

Murs chronology
Murs Is My Best Friend (2001)	Varsity Blues (2002)	The End of the Beginning (2003)

Professional ratings
Review scores
Source	Rating
RapReviews.com	9/10

Varsity Blues is a 2002 EP by American rapper Murs. It is built around the theme of blues. It has the intention of helping teenagers through hard times, mainly African American high school students.

A sequel titled Varsity Blues 2 was released in 2011.

== Track listing ==
No.	Title	Producer(s)	Length
1.	"Varsity Blues"	Mum's the Word	4:05
2.	"Belief's Blues"	Belief	4:08
3.	"County Blues"	Ant	2:45
4.	"Writer's Blues" (featuring The Underbosses)	Bones	3:22
5.	"A Friend's Blues"	Justin Martin	3:47
6.	"The Deepest Blue"	Black Panther	2:03
