= Brighter Daze =

Studio album by Murs & 9th Wonder
- Released: December 31, 2015
- Recorded: 2015
- Genre: Hip-hop
- Label: Jamla Records
- Producer: 9th Wonder

Murs & 9th Wonder chronology
The Final Adventure (2012)	Brighter Daze (2015)

Brighter Daze is the sixth collaboration album by Murs and 9th Wonder. It was released on December 31, 2015 by Jamla Records. The album is produced by 9th Wonder and features guest appearances by Rapsody, Problem, Bad Lucc, Mac Miller, Reuben Vincent, Propaganda, Vinny Radio, Franchise and Choo Jackson.

== Track listing ==
No.	Title	Length
1.	"The Battle"	2:08
2.	"God Black/Black God"	3:06
3.	"How to Rob with Rob"	2:26
4.	"Lover Murs"	2:40
5.	"Get Naked" (featuring Problem)	3:53
6.	"The Shutters" (featuring Reuben Vincent and Bad Lucc)	3:13
7.	"Wait...Back It Up"	3:05
8.	"If This Should End"	3:26
9.	"Walk Like a God" (featuring Rapsody and Propaganda)	4:04
10.	"Otha Fish"	3:11
11.	"No Shots" (featuring Mac Miller, Vinny Radio, Franchise and Choo Jackson)	5:37
12.	"Murs SuperStar"	3:08
