= F'Real =

Studio album by Murs
- Released: March 10, 1997
- Genre: Hip-hop
- Label: Veritech Records
- Producer: Arata; Bizarro; Eclipse 427; Elusive; Eye-3; Gandoff; The Grouch; Slur Face; Vector Omega

Murs chronology
F'Real (1997)	Good Music (1999)

F'Real is the first album by hip-hop artist Murs. It was released by the Independent record label, Veritech Records, in 1997. It is considered very rare.

== Track listing ==
1. 2 Reasons (featuring Aesop)
2. 8th Samurai
3. 4 The Record
4. BasikMurs
5. Interview With The Dominant (featuring Kirby Dominant)
6. Dominant Freestyle
7. M-3 (Anger)
8. Say Anything (featuring Arata, Bizarro, The Grouch and P$C)
9. The Saint
10. Morocco Mike
11. Nine-Five
12. The Maguire Song
13. Live My Life
14. Nites Like This
15. The Extras (featuring Big Texas and Evanessence)
16. Ease Back
17. The Sermon
