= Add-2 =

American rapper (born 1986)

- Born: Andre D'Juan Daniels; March 31, 1986 (age 40); Chicago, Illinois, United States
- Origin: Chicago, Illinois, United States
- Genres: Hip hop
- Occupations: Rapper, songwriter
- Years active: 2006–present
- Labels: It's a Wonderful World Music Group, PressAndPush Entertainment

Andre D'Juan Daniels (born March 31, 1986), better known by his stage name Add-2, sometimes stylized as Add 2, is an American rapper who first gained popularity after the release of his second mixtape, A Tale of Two's City: Volume 2. In 2009, his single "Luxury" was featured on MTV, MtvU's top 5 freshman and Vh1 respectively. "Luxury" is part of Add-2's third mixtape, "Tale of Two's City Vol. 3: The Rise & Fall." Add-2 has also worked with Grammy award winning music producer 9th Wonder along with Kendrick Lamar, The Roots and Gerald Walker.

== Discography ==
=== Studio albums ===
- Prey For the Poor (2015)
- Jim Crow: The Musical (2019)

=== Collaborative albums ===
- Between Heaven & Hell (with Khrysis) (2013)

=== Mixtapes ===
- Tale Of Two's City Vol. 1 (2005)
- Tale Of Two's City Vol. 2: The Return Of The Menace (2007)
- Coast 2 Coast Exclusives Vol. 5 (2008)
- Tale Of Two's City Vol. 3: The Rise & Fall (2009)
- Tale Of Two's City Vol. 4: Better Days (2010)
- One Missed Call (2011)
- Save.Our.Souls (2012)
- More Missed Calls (2013)

== Guest appearances ==
- 2010: "Ghetto Tekz Runnin' It" DJ Rashad featuring Add-2
- 2013: "Set It Off" Slot-A featuring Add-2
- 2013: "I Wish Too (PSA)" Ben Official featuring Add-2
- 2014: "Wreckin Crew" Dizzy Wright featuring Add-2 & Bishop Nehru
- 2014: "Regular Days" Ether Q featuring Add-2 & Mike Kozitka
- 2016: "Mace Windu" Noveliss featuring Add-2
- 2016: "Nocturnal Youth" Lucius P. Thundercat featuring Ransom & Add-2
- 2017: "Pursuit of Success" K Noble featuring Add-2
- 2017: "Victory" Bennett Sully featuring Add-2 & Defcee
- 2018: "Live & Learn" J.R. Miller featuring Add-2
