= Choo Jackson =

American hip hop recording artist

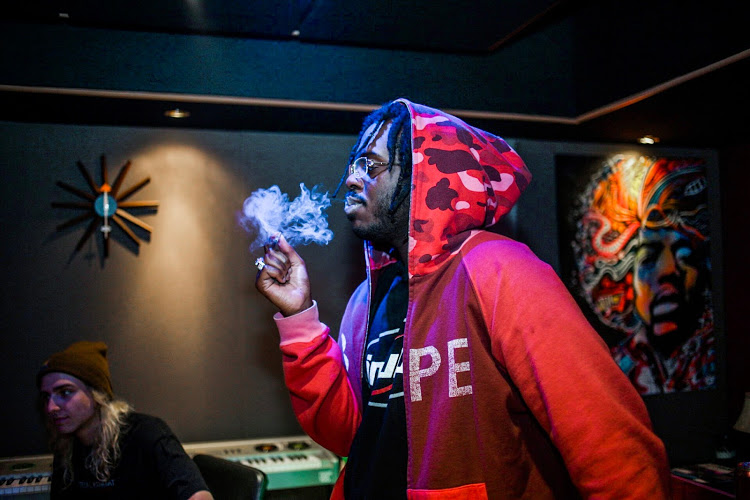

Background information
- Birth name: Ramaar Akeem Jackson
- Born: June 19; Vero Beach, Florida, United States
- Origin: Chambersburg, Pennsylvania, United States
- Genres: Alternative hip hop Rap alt rap
- Occupation(s): Rapper, producer
- Instrument: Vocals
- Years active: 2011 – present
- Labels: REMember Music, ForeverKool, Phresh Muney

Ramaar Akeem Jackson, better known by his stage name Choo Jackson, is an American hip hop recording artist, and producer. He is a Florida native from Vero Beach who later moved to Chambersburg, Pennsylvania. He worked at ID Labs studio in Pittsburgh, Pennsylvania, where he was discovered by Mac Miller, who signed him to his label. He has appeared, along with his song "Bikes", on MTV2's on Mac Miller and the Most Dope Family.

== Career ==
=== 2011–present: BFP ===
Choo Jackson made his first appearance on Most Dope with Mac Miller remixing his Presh Muney song "Regular Guy". His debut release on Most Dope, "Beer Flavored Pizza", released on January 15, 2013. The project was mixed by DJ Clockwork and featured 6 songs self-produced by Choo along with guest production from Larry Fisherman and Brandun DeShay. In May, he appeared on Ustream to play a new song titled "Windows" as well as to pay respects to "the Based God", Lil B .

== Discography ==
- This World (September 2012)
- Beer Flavored Pizza (January 2013)
- Broken Hearts Make Money (2015)
- Anime (2015)
- Choo Where U Goin? (2016)
- Parade (2017)
- Anime 2 (2019)
- TrailerBoy (2020)
- Flooded Mixtape (2020)
- Ghetto Beautiful Misery (2020)
