= Murs 3:16: The 9th Edition =

Studio album by Murs and 9th Wonder
- Released: March 23, 2004
- Recorded: 2003
- Genre: Hip-hop
- Length: 35:14
- Label: Definitive Jux
- Producer: El-P (exec.); 9th Wonder

Murs and 9th Wonder chronology
Murs 3:16: The 9th Edition (2004)	Murray's Revenge (2006)

Singles from Murs 3:16: The 9th Edition
- 1. "Bad Man!" / "3:16" Released: May 14, 2004; 2. "H-U-S-T-L-E" / "H-U-S-T-L-E (Remix)" Released: September 21, 2004

Professional ratings
Aggregate scores
Source	Rating
Metacritic	85/100
Review scores
Source	Rating
AllMusic	4/5 stars
Alternative Press	5/5
Blender	3/5 stars
Drowned in Sound	6/10
HipHopDX	4.5/5
Mojo	4/5 stars
Pitchfork	8.1/10
Resident Advisor	4.0/5
Spin	B+
Tiny Mix Tapes	4/5

Murs 3:16: The 9th Edition is the first collaboration album from California rapper Murs (formerly of Living Legends) and North Carolina producer 9th Wonder (formerly of Little Brother). It was released on Definitive Jux on March 23, 2004.

The title is a reference to Murs' birthday of March 16, as well as 9th Wonder's involvement.

The remix version for the track "H-U-S-T-L-E" features John Cena, making also an appearance in the video clip.

== Track listing ==
No.	Title	Length
1.	"Intro"	1:41
2.	"Bad Man!"	4:16
3.	"3:16"	2:46
4.	"The Pain"	4:04
5.	"Trevor an' Them"	1:34
6.	"Freak These Tales"	4:28
7.	"H-U-S-T-L-E"	3:43
8.	"Walk Like a Man"	4:39
9.	"And This Is For..."	4:57
10.	"The Animal" (featuring Phonte)	3:06

== Personnel ==
- Murs – vocals
- 9th Wonder – engineering, mixing, production
- Phonte – vocals on "The Animal"
- El-P – executive producer
- ESE – project coordinator
- Ken Heitmueller – mastering
- Dan Monick – photography
- Chris Tyson – engineering

== Charts ==
Chart (2004)	Peak position
US Heatseekers Albums (Billboard)	23
US Independent Albums (Billboard)	16
US Top R&B/Hip-Hop Albums (Billboard)	87
