= Little Brother discography =

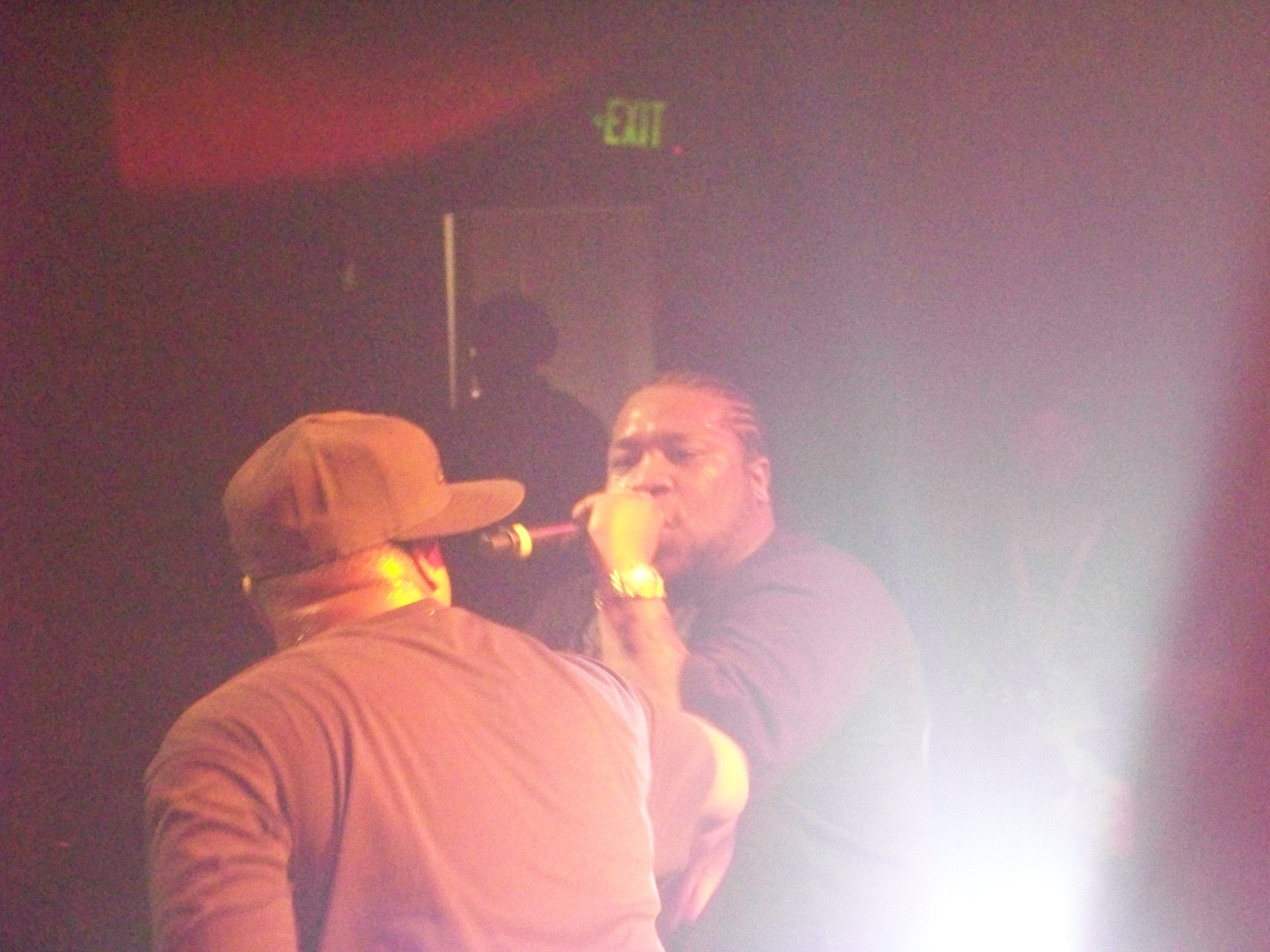
Little Brother performing in Atlanta, 2008

The following is the discography of American hip hop duo Little Brother.

== Studio albums ==
Album information
The Listening
- Released: February 25, 2003
- Singles: "The Get Up", "So Fabulous"
The Minstrel Show
- Released: September 13, 2005
- US sales: 117,255
- Billboard 200 chart position: #56
- R&B/Hip-Hop chart position:
- Singles: "Lovin' It", "Say It Again" b/w "Slow It Down"
Getback
- Released: October 23, 2007
- Billboard 200 chart position: #89
- Singles: "Good Clothes" "Step It Up" "Breakin' My Heart"
Leftback
- Released: April 20, 2010
- Billboard 200 chart position: #128
- Singles: "Curtain Call"
May the Lord Watch
- Released: August 20, 2019
- US Independent Albums chart position: #11

== Mixtapes ==
Album information
Chittlin Circuit
- Released: 2004
- RIAA Certification: Unknown
- Billboard 200 chart position: none
- R&B/Hip-Hop chart position: none
- Singles: "Altitudes"
Chittlin Circuit 1.5
- Released: June 21, 2005
- RIAA Certification: Unknown
- Billboard 200 chart position: none
- R&B/Hip-Hop chart position: none
- Singles: "The Beginning", "Nobody Like Me"
Separate But Equal
- Released: 2006
- RIAA Certification: Unknown
- Billboard 200 chart position: none
- R&B/Hip-Hop chart position: none
- Singles: "Can't Let Her", "Macaroni"
And Justus for All
- Released: 2007
- RIAA Certification: Unknown
- Billboard 200 chart position: none
- R&B/Hip-Hop chart position: none
- Singles: "Last Day", "Pressure"

== Singles ==
from The Listening

- "Whatever You Say" b/w "Light It Up" (2002)
- "The Way You Do It" b/w "The Getup" (2003)

from Sleepers

- "Strongest Man" ()
- "Just Friends" b/w "Scars" ()

from The Chitlin Circuit 1.5

- "Nobody Like Me" b/w "Welcome To Durham" ()

from The Minstrel Show

- "Lovin' It" b/w "Hold On (Tellin' Me)" ()
- "Slow It Down" b/w "Say It Again" (2006)

from Getback

- "Good Clothes" (2007)

from Leftback

- "Curtain Call" (2010)

== Live albums ==
Album information
The Commercial Free EP
- Released: 2006
- RIAA Certification: Unknown
- Billboard 200 chart position: none
- R&B/Hip-Hop chart position: none

== Members ==
=== Phonte Albums ===
- 2003: Phonte & Eccentric: The Story of US
- 2004: The Foreign Exchange: Connected
  The Foreign Exchange: Leave It All Behind
- 2008: Phonte & Zo!: Zo! & Tigallo Love The 80's
- 2010: The Foreign Exchange: Authenticity
- 2011: Charity Starts At Home
- 2018: No News Is Good News

=== Rapper Big Pooh Albums ===
- Sleepers
- 2009: The Delightful Bars
- 2011: Fat Boy Fresh Vol. 1: For Members Only
- 2011: Dirty Pretty Things
- 2012: Fat Boy Fresh Vol.2
- 2012: Sleepers: Narcoleptic Outtakes (EP)
- 2013: Fat Boy Fresh Vol.3
- 2013: Fat Boy Fresh Vol.3.5

=== 9th Wonder Albums ===
- 2004: 9th Wonder & Murs: Murs 3:16: The 9th Edition
- : Dream Merchant Vol. 1
- : 9th Wonder & Buckshot: Chemistry
- : 9th Wonder & Kaze: Spirit Of '94: Version 9.0
- 2006: 9th Wonder & Murs: Murray's Revenge
- 2006: 9th Wonder & Skyzoo: Cloud 9: The Three Day High
- 2007: Dream Merchant Vol. 2
- : 9th Wonder & Buckshot: The Formula
- : 9th Wonder & Jean Grae: Jeanius
- : 9th Wonder & Murs: Sweet Lord
- 2011: The Wonder Years
- 2018: 9th Wonder Presents: Jamla Is the Squad II

== Guest Appearances ==
=== 2004 ===
The Sound Providers - An Evening with The Sound Providers - "Braggin' & Boasting"

=== 2005 ===
- 9th Wonder & Buckshot - Chemistry - "Birdz (Fly The Coup)" (w/ Keisha Shontelle) ^{1} & "U Wonderin'" (w/ Sean Price) ^{2}
- 9th Wonder - Dream Merchant Vol. 1 - "Speed", "Mr. Dream Merchant" ^{2} & "Almost Geunine" (w/ Defcon) ^{1}
- Kev Brown - I Do What I Do - "Beats n Rhymes" ^{1}
- The Perceptionists - Black Dialogue - "5 O'Clock" ^{1}
- The Away Team - National Anthem - "Band Practice" ^{1}

=== 2006 ===
- Hall of Justus - Hall of Justus: Soldiers of Fortune - "Back At It" (w/ Cormega) ^{1}
- DJ Spinna - Intergalactic Soul - "Make it Hot" ^{1}
- DJ Shadow - The Outsider - "Backstage Girl" ^{1}

=== 2007 ===
- 9th Wonder - The Dream Merchant Vol. 2 - "No Time To Play" & "What Makes a Man" (w/ Buddy Klein) ^{2}
- Cormega - Who Am I? - "The Rap Game" ^{1}
- DJ Jazzy Jeff - The Return of the Magnificent EP - "Whatever You Want"
- Playaz Circle - Supply & Demand - "Paper Chasin'" ^{1}
- Cunninglynguists - Dirty Acres - "Yellow Lines" ^{1}
- Kev Brown - Exclusive Joints - "United Soul" ^{1}

=== 2008 ===
- eMC - The Show - "Traffic"
- Jake One, White Van Music - "Bless the Child"
- Kidz in the Hall - The In Crowd - "Paper Trail" ^{1}
- Pete Rock - NY's Finest - "Bring Y'all Back" (w/ Joe Scudda)
- Akrobatik - Absolute Value - "Be Prepared"
- Statik Selektah - Stick 2 the Script - "On The Marquee"
- Jean Grae - Jeanius - "The Time is Now" ^{1}

=== 2010 ===
- The Roots - How I Got Over - "Now or Never" & "The Day" ^{1}
- Slum Village - Villa Manifesto - "Where Do We Go from Here"
- Strong Arm Steady - In Search of Stoney Jackson - "Best of Times" ^{1}
- Yazarah - The Ballad of Purple St. James - "Cry Over You" ^{1}

=== 2011 ===
- 9th Wonder - The Wonder Years - "Band Practice" and "One Nights" ^{1}

=== 2012 ===
- Brother Ali - The Bite Marked Heart - "I'll Be Around" ^{1}

=== 2022 ===
- Phife Dawg - Forever - "2 Live Forever" (w/ Posdnuos & Darien Brockington)

=== Key ===
^{1} (Phonte only) ^{2} (Rapper Big Pooh only)
