= Nottz production discography =

The following is the discography of Nottz, an American hip hop producer and rapper.

Singles are in bold.

== 1998 ==
=== Various – Lyricist Lounge, Volume One ===
- 2-08. "Holy Water" (D.V. Alias Khrist and Lord Have Mercy)

=== D.V. Alias Khrist - Black Mack Motion Picture soundtrack ===
- 07. "The Attack Is On"

=== Busta Rhymes – E.L.E. (Extinction Level Event): The Final World Front ===
- 02. "Everybody Rise"
- 03. "Where We Are About to Take It"
- 04. "Extinction Level Event (The Song of Salvation)"

== 1999 ==
=== Various – Violator: The Album ===
- 03. "Whatcha Come Around Here For?" (Flipmode Squad)

=== Various – Thicker Than Water (soundtrack) ===
- 05. "Thicker Than Blood" (Terror Squad)

=== The Notorious B.I.G. – Born Again ===
- 05. "Dangerous MCs" (featuring Snoop Dogg, Busta Rhymes & Mark Curry)

== 2000 ==
=== Rah Digga – Dirty Harriet ===
- 08. "Showdown"
- 09. "The Last Word" (feat. Outsidaz)
- 11. "Straight Spittin' Part II"
- 12. "What's Up wit' That"
- 14. "Just for You"

=== Busta Rhymes – Anarchy ===
- 11. "**Get Out!!**"
- 13. "A Trip out of Town"
- 21. "Anarchy"

=== M.O.P. – Warriorz ===
- 14. "Home Sweet Home" (featuring Lord Have Mercy)

=== Various - Lyricist Lounge 2 ===
- 19. "Legendary Street Team" (Remix) [Kool G Rap & M.O.P.]

=== Funkmaster Flex – 60 Minutes of Funk – The Mix Tape Volume IV ===
- 19. "Uhhnnh" (The Bad Seed)

=== Xzibit – Restless ===
- 04. "U Know" (featuring Dr. Dre) [co-producer]

== 2001 ==
=== Krumbsnatcha – Long Awaited – Snatcha Season Pt. 2 ===
- 04. "Blaze" (featuring Blackndekuh, Nottz & Spoon)
- 09. "Do U Wanna" (featuring Boogieman & Top Gun)
- 11. "Can't Get None" (featuring Lord Tariq)
- 13. "Hood Turn Hot"
- 14. "Killer in Me"
- 15. "Jungle"
- 16. "Take Your Pain Away"

=== Sticky Fingaz - Black Trash: The Autobiography of Kirk Jones ===
- 09. "State Vs. Kirk Jones" (featuring Canibus, Redman, Scared 4 Life, Rah Digga & Superb)

=== Ed O.G. – The Truth Hurts ===
- 05. "What U Know" (featuring Nottz)

=== Various – Training Day (soundtrack) ===
- 02. "W.O.L.V.E.S." (KrumbsnatchaM.O.P.)

=== Busta Rhymes – Genesis ===
- 01. "Intro"
- 09. "Pass the Courvoisier" (feat. P. Diddy)
- 20. "Bad Dreams"

== 2002 ==
=== 50 Cent – Guess Who's Back? ===
- 09. "Be a Gentleman"

=== Scarface – The Fix ===
- 06. "Keep Me Down"

=== Various – Snoop Dogg Presents…Doggy Style Allstars Vol. 1 ===
- 13. "Don't Make a Wrong Move" (Prodigy, Snoop Dogg & Special Ed)

=== Krumbsnatcha – Respect All Fear None ===
- 09. "Oxygen" (featuring Boogieman)

== 2003 ==
=== DJ Kay Slay - The Streetsweeper, Vol. 1 ===
- 15. "Angels' Voice" (Flipmode Squad)

=== Black Moon – Total Eclipse ===
- 06. "Why We Act This Way?"

=== Pitch Black – Pitch Black Law ===
- 08. "R You Ready 4 This?" (featuring Busta Rhymes)

=== Craig G – This Is Now!!! ===
- 05. "Now That's What's Up" (featuring Mr. Cheeks)

=== G-Unit – Beg for Mercy ===
- 09. "Footprints"

== 2004 ==
=== Cassidy – Split Personality ===
- 12. "Real Talk"

=== Ghostface – The Pretty Toney Album ===
- 14. "Be This Way"
- 16. "Tooken Back" (featuring Jacki-O)

=== Krumbsnatcha – Let the Truth Be Told ===
- 03. "Do Me"
- 04. "Boston to VA" (featuring Fam-Lay)
- 06. "Thorough" (featuring Ghostface Killah & Solomon Childs)
- 14. "Get Live" (featuring DMP)
- 00. "Never Grow Up"

=== 213 – The Hard Way ===
- 07. "Lonely Girl"

=== Kardinal Offishall – Kill Bloodclott Bill ===
- 04. "Gas"

== 2005 ==
=== Ghostface Killah and Trife Da God – Put It on the Line ===
- 03. "Struggle"

=== Consequence – ``_`` ===
- 01. "Caught Up in the Hype"

=== Skillz – Confessions of a Ghostwriter ===
- 06. "Wave Ya Hands" (featuring Musiq Soulchild)
- 07. "Imagine"
- 08. "S.K.I.L.L.Z."

=== Canibus – Hip-Hop for Sale ===
- 01. "It's No Other Than"
- 02. "Back wit Heat"
- 04. "Show 'Em How"
- 05. "Dear Academy"
- 06. "I Gotcha"

=== Royce da 5'9" – Independent's Day ===
- 05. "**Politics**" (featuring Cee-Lo Green)
- 09. "Blow Dat..."

Lupe Fiasco - Farenheit 1/15: The Truth is Among Us

- 06. "Failure"

== 2006 ==
=== Little Brother – Soldiers of Fortune (Hall of Justus album) ===
- 07. "Life of the Party" (featuring Carlitta Durand)

=== Snoop Dogg – Tha Blue Carpet Treatment ===
- 05. "**That's That Shit**" (featuring R. Kelly)

=== The Game – Doctor's Advocate ===
- 10. "One Night"

== 2007 ==
=== Sunshine Anderson – Sunshine at Midnight ===
- 03. "My Whole Life"

=== Boot Camp Clik – Casualties of War ===
- 04. "Bubblin' Up"

=== WC – Guilty by Affiliation ===
- 03. "Jack & the Bean Stalk"

=== Swizz Beatz – One Man Band Man ===
- 03. "Big Munny"

=== Kanye West – Graduation ===
- 07. "Barry Bonds" (featuring Lil' Wayne) [co-produced by Kanye West]

=== Little Brother – Getback ===
- 08. "Two-Step Blues" (featuring Darien Brockington)

=== Scarface – Made ===
- 04. "**Girl You Know**"

=== Cassidy – B.A.R.S. The Barry Adrian Reese Story ===
- 11. "I Get My Paper"

=== DJ Drama – Gangsta Grillz: The Album ===
- 13. "Talk Bout Me" (featuring G-Unit)

== 2008 ==
=== Snoop Dogg – Ego Trippin' ===
- 11. "Deez Hollywood Nights"

=== Dwele – Sketches of a Man ===
- 05. "A Few Reasons (Truth Pt. 2)"

=== Blackndeckah - ``_`` ===
- "You"

=== AZ – Undeniable ===
- 04. "Fire"
- 10. "Now I Know"

=== The Game – L.A.X. ===
- 07. "Cali Sunshine" (featuring Bilal)
- 08. "Ya Heard" (featuring Ludacris)

=== Kardinal Offishall – Not 4 Sale ===
- 08. "Ill Eagle Alien"

=== Murs – Murs for President ===
- 10. "**Me and This Jawn**"
- 11. "Think You Know Me"

=== Termanology – Politics As Usual ===
- 05. "Please Don't Go"
- 06. "Float"
- 08. "Drugs Crimes Gorillaz" (featuring Freeway & Sheek Louch)

=== Scarface – Emeritus ===
- 04. "Can't Get Right" (featuring Bilal)
- 05. "Still Here" (featuring Shateish)

=== Adama - ``_`` ===
- "Take Me Home"/ Remix

=== Diamond D – The Huge Hefner Chronicles ===
- 03. "D-I-A-M-O-N-D"

== 2009 ==
=== Asher Roth – Asleep in the Bread Aisle ===
- 15. "Y.O.U." [UK Bonus Track)] (featuring Slick Rick)

=== Finale – A Pipe Dream and a Promise ===
- 06. "Jumper Cables"
- 11. "Brother's Keeper"

=== Skyzoo – The Salvation ===
- 05. "**Popularity**"
- 16. "Maintain"

=== M.O.P. – Foundation ===
- 11. "I'm a Brownsvillain"

=== KRS-One & Buckshot – Survival Skills ===
- 09. "One Shot" (featuring Pharoahe Monch)

=== Cormega - Born & Raised ===
- 10. "What Did I Do"

=== Shafiq Husayn – Shafiq En' A-Free-Ka (Nottz Remix) ===
- 03. "Cheeba" (featuring Bilal)

=== Royce da 5'9" – Street Hop ===
- 02. "Count for Nothing"
- 13. "Street Hop"

=== Rakim – The Seventh Seal ===
- 04. "Man Above" (featuring Tracey Horton)

=== Snoop Dogg – Malice n Wonderland ===
- 11. "Pimpin' Ain't EZ" (featuring R. Kelly)

== 2010 ==
=== Rah Digga – DJ Booth.net exclusive ===
- "A Few Thoughts"

=== Snoop Dogg – More Malice ===
- 02. "Protocol"

=== Dwele – W.ants W.orld W.omen ===
- 02. "I Wish"
- 16. "Give Me a Chance"

=== Mayer Hawthorne – bonus "Stones Throw Records" track ===
- "I Need You"

=== Bilal – Airtight's Revenge ===
- 04. "Flying"
- 00. "Free"

=== Rah Digga – Classic ===
Entire Album produced by Nottz

- 01. "The Book Of Rashia"
- 02. "Who Gonna Check Me Boo"
- 03. "This Ain't No Lil' Kid Rap"
- 04. "Straight Spittin' IV"
- 05. "Classic"
- 06. "Solidified"
- 07. "Feel Good"
- 08. "Viral"
- 09. "Back It Up"
- 10. "You Got It"
- 00. "This ain't No Lil Kid Rap" (Remix) (featuring Redman)

== 2011 ==
=== Nefew – Man Vs. Many ===
- 02. "Game"

=== Joell Ortiz – Free Agent ===
- 08. "Nursery Rhyme"

=== Pusha T – Fear of God ===
- 08. "Open Your Eyes"

=== Pusha T – Fear of God II: Let Us Pray ===
- 12. "Alone in Vegas"

=== A.W.O.L.L. - ``_`` ===
- "Big Bang Theory"

=== Torae – For The Record ===
- 13. "Thank You"

=== Strong Arm Steady – Arms & Hammers ===
- 06. "All the Brothers" (featuring Chace Infinite, Talib Kweli, KRS-One & Planet Asia)

=== Reks – Rhythmatic Eternal King Supreme ===
- 03. "Limelight"

=== Rapsody – Thank H.E.R. Now ===
- 18. "H.E.R. Throne"

=== Rapper Big Pooh – Dirty Pretty Things ===
- 04. "Are You Ready" (featuring Torae)
- 08. "Ballad of the Son"

=== Asher Roth - ``_`` ===
- "Summertime" (featuring Quan)

=== Royce da 5'9" – Success Is Certain ===
- 03. "Merry Go Round"
- 06. "On the Boulevard (featuring Nottz & Adonis)

=== Snoop Dogg & Wiz Khalifa – Mac & Devin Go to High School <soundtrack> ===
- 04. "6:30"

== 2012 ==
=== AWAR – The Laws of Nature ===
- 04. "Keep Risin"
- 05. "Until the End" (featuring Nottz, Murs & P. Jericho)

=== Bow Wow - ``_`` ===
- "Yeah Yeah" (featuring Lloyd Banks)

=== Nefew & Shakes – For Hip-Hop ===
- 01. "Change the World" (featuring Rapper Big Pooh)
- 02. "Last Days"
- 03. "For Hip-Hop"
- 04. "Been There Done That"
- 05. "We March"

=== Wale – Folarin ===
- 09. "Skool Daze"

== 2013 ==
=== MellowHigh & Earl Wolf - ``_`` ===
- "Look"

=== Pusha T – My Name Is My Name ===
- 10. "Nosetalgia" (featuring Kendrick Lamar) [co-produced by Kanye West]

=== Xzibit, B-Real & Demrick – Serial Killers Vol. 1 ===
- 12. "Laugh Now" (featuring Jon Connor)

=== Kardinal Offishall - ``_`` ===
- "Game of Clones"

== 2014 ==
=== Mac Miller - ``_`` ===
- "Walkin Home"

=== Slaughterhouse – House Rules ===
- 02. "Say Dat Then"

=== Asher Roth - ``_`` ===
- "Rasputin"

=== The Proz - ``_`` ===
- "Doap"

=== The Game – Blood Moon: Year of the Wolf ===
- 17. "Bloody Moon"

=== The Lox – The Trinity (3rd Sermon) ===
- 06. "Now Listen"

== 2015 ==
=== Asher Roth - ``_`` ===
- "Blow Yr Head"

=== YU of Diamond District – Persona ===
- 02. "Homicide"

=== Diamond District – March On Washington Redux ===
- 10. "Lost Cause"

=== Mac Miller - ``_`` ===
- "Pet Sounds" (featuring Sean Price)

=== Scarface – Deeply Rooted ===
- 07. "Anything" (produced with N.O. Joe]

=== Add-2 – Prey for the Poor ===
- 01. "Prey for the Poor"

=== Talib Kweli & 9th Wonder – Indie 500 ===
- 01. "Which Side Are You On" (featuring Tef Poe)
- 09. "These Waters" (featuring K.Valentine, NIKO IS, Chris Rob & Jessica Care Moore)
- 11. "Bangers" (featuring MK Asante & Halo)

=== Bankrupt Billionaires - ``_`` ===
- "I'm Here (Remix)" (featuring Rapper Big Pooh & Blu)

=== Busta Rhymes – The Return of the Dragon (The Abstract Went on Vacation) ===
- 15. "Proper Leader's Skit"

== 2016 ==
=== Torae – Entitled ===
- 04. "Clap Shit Up" (featuring Phonte)

=== Koache – Game Point ===
- 02. "Hood Love" (featuring Cory Gunz)
- 03. "Turn Me Back" (featuring Xzibit)
- 06. "Karma"

=== BJ the Chicago Kid - ``_`` ===
- "OMG" (featuring Jay Rock)

=== Royce da 5'9" – Tabernacle: Trust the Shooter ===
- 05. "Which Is Cool"

=== Royce da 5'9 – Layers ===
- 07. "Shine"

=== Alpha Faktion – ``_`` ===
- "Creative Control"

=== J Dilla - The Diary ===
- 04. "The Shining Part 1"

=== Snoop Dogg – Coolaid ===
- 03. "Don't Stop" (featuring Too Short)

=== The Bad Seed – Coreyography ===
- 08. "Belt Off"

=== Ras Kass - ``_`` ===
- "Amerikkkan Horror Story, Pt. 1"

=== Marvalyss - ``_`` ===
- "Black Caesars"

=== Reks – The Greatest X ===
- 10. "The Recipe"
- 11. "Unknown"

=== Villain Notsha - ``_`` ===
- "Untrue" (featuring Rapper Big Pooh)

=== Talib Kweli – Awful People Are Great at Parties ===
- 09. "Every Ghetto Pt. 2" (featuring Aloe Blacc & Problem)

=== Rapsody – Crown ===
- 03. "Tina Turner"

=== Termanology – More Politics ===
- 08. "Krazy Thangs" (featuring Cyrus DeShield)

=== Jaheim – Struggle Love ===
- 07. ""Something Tells Me"

=== Hodgy – Fireplace: TheNotTheOtherSide ===
- 05. "They Want"
- 12. "The Now"

=== T.I. – Us or Else: Letter to the System ===
- 01. "I Believe"
- 09. "Pain"

== 2017 ==
=== Stik Figa – Central Standard Time ===
- 02. "Down Payment" (featuring Elzhi)

=== Coin Banks - ``_`` ===
- "H.E.R." (featuring Atom, Chris Foster & Danny Martin)

=== Talib Kweli & Styles P – The Seven ===
- 01. "Poets and Gangstas"

=== Royce da 5'9" – Bar Exam 4 ===
- 10. "Chopping Block" (featuring Slaughterhouse)

=== Sean Price – Imperius Rex ===
- 14. "Clans & Cliks" (featuring Smif-N-Wessun, Rock, Method Man, Raekwon, Inspectah Deck & Foul Monday)

=== Snoop Dogg - ``_`` ===
- "What Is This?" (featuring October London)

=== GQ – E 14th ===
- 02. "Everything the Same"
- 04. "Laundry Day"

=== Rapsody – Laila's Wisdom ===
- 01. "Laila's Wisdom"

=== Hustle Gang – We Want Smoke ===
- 07. "So High" (featuring Peanut da Don, London Jae, Young Dro and T.I.)

=== Kardinal Offishall – Dave Chappelle – Equanimity (Netflix Comedy Special) ===
- 00. "Reaching Through the Darkness" (show outro)

== 2018 ==
=== Apathy – The Widow's Son ===
- 06. "Alien Weaponry"

=== Evidence – Weather or Not ===
- 04. "Jim Dean"
- 08. "Bad Publicity" featuring:Krondon

=== Phonte – No News Is Good News ===
- 04. "Expensive Genes"

=== 9th Wonder Presents: Jamla Is the Squad II ===
- 09. Reuben Vincent – "You Know I Gotta"

=== Rapsody – Laila's Wisdom ===
- 01. "Laila's Wisdom"

=== Serial Killers – Day of the Dead ===
- 02. "Get Away with It"

=== Seed x Nottz – No Way In Hell ===
Whole album

=== Napsndreds – Trouble & A Pair of Dice ===
Whole album

== 2019 ==
=== Andy Mineo – Work in Process ===
- 08. "1988 Remake 2"

=== Smif-N-Wessun – The All ===
- 07. "Let Me Tell Ya" (feat. Rick Ross)

=== Murs – The Iliad Is Dead and the Odyssey Is Over ===
- 03. "My Hero" (feat. Heather Victoria)
- 11. "Super Cojo Bros" (feat. GQ & Cojo)

=== Little Brother – May the Lord Watch ===
- 04. "Right on Time"
- 11. "Sittin Alone"

=== Rapsody – Eve ===
- 12. "Michelle" (feat. Elle Varner)
- 14. "Hatshepsut" (feat. Queen Latifah)

=== Prayah - ``_`` ===
- 00."I Swear" feat. Keyzz

== 2020 ==
=== Reks - T.H.I.N.G.S/ ===
- 02. "T.H.I.N.G.S."

=== The Lox – Living Off Xperience ===
- 06. "Story"

=== Busta Rhymes – Extinction Level Event 2: The Wrath of God ===
- 01. "E.L.E. 2 Intro" (with Chris Rock, Rakim and Pete Rock)
- 06. "E.L.E. 2 The Wrath of God" (featuring Minister Louis Farrakhan)
- 07. "Slow Flow" (featuring Ol' Dirty Bastard)
- 19. "**Look Over Your Shoulder**" (featuring Kendrick Lamar)
- 21. "Freedom?" (featuring Nikki Grier)
- 28. "Follow the Wave" (feat. Flipmode Squad)

== 2021 ==
=== Snoop Dogg – From tha Streets 2 tha Suites ===
- 09. "Look Around" (featuring J-Black)

=== Your Old Droog- The YOD Fahim ===
- 05. "Slam Dunk Contest" (featuring Pharoahe Monch)

=== Nottz – The Future Is Female ===
- 00. "Black Woman" (featuring Rapsody, Ke Turner, Rah Digga and Nikki Grier)

=== Snoop Dogg – Algorithm ===
- 14. "Murder Music" (featuring:Benny The Butcher, Jadakiss & Busta Rhymes)
- 16. "Qualified" (featuring:Larry June and October London – (keyboard by: Brian "B Nasty" Reid)
- 20. "Whatever You On" (Jane Handcock – (keyboard by: Brian "B Nasty" Reid)

== 2022 ==
=== Snoop Dogg – BODR ===
- 15. "It's in the Air" (featuring Uncle Murda and Jane Handcock)

=== Phife Dawg – Forever ===
- 05. "Sorry" (featuring V.Rich)
- 13. "Forever" (co-produced by DJ Rasta Root and V.Rich)

=== Diamond D – Rear View Mirror ===
- 05. "The Rear View"
- 08. "Ouuu" (feat. Stacy Epps)

=== Milez Grimez - Mileztone ===
- 06. "Domino Effect" (feat. Blue Raspberry)

=== Shateish – EP ===
- 01. "Devil's Chords"
- 07. "We"

== 2023 ==
=== Blu & Nottz - Afrika ===
Whole Album

=== Tzarism - O.T.H.E.R. ===
- 07. "Scenes in the Dark"

=== Jane Handcock – World of Woman ===
- 13. "I Wanna Thank Me 2.0" (feat. Snoop Dogg)

=== Samy Deluxe - Hochkultur 2 ===
- 04. "ASD Track"
- 10. "A.S.A."
- 16. "Don Quixote"

== 2024 ==
=== MC Lyte - 1 of 1 ===
- 02. "Thank You" (featuring Mary Mary & Muni Long) (produced with Warryn Campbell)
- 04. "King King" (featuring Queen Latifah) (produced with Warryn Campbell)

=== Busta Rhymes ===
- 00. "Unlease Me"

=== Ice Cube - Man Down (album) ===
- 05. "Not Like Them"

== 2025 ==
=== Snoop Dogg - Iz It a Crime? ===
- 06. "I Can't Wait" (featuring LaRussell)
- 18. "Let Me Love You"

=== Raekwon - The Emperor's New Clothes ===
- 13. "The Omerta" (featuring Nas)

=== De La Soul - Cabin in the Sky ===
- 07. "A Quick 16 For Mama" (featuring Killer Mike)

== See also ==
- Love for Sale (Bilal album), an unreleased album by Bilal, for which Nottz assisted in producing
