= The Dream Merchant =

The Dream Merchant may refer to:

- The Dream Merchant (novel), a 2002 Dutch fantasy novel by Isabel Hoving
- Dream Merchant Vol. 1, a 2005 album by 9th Wonder
- The Dream Merchant Vol. 2, a 2007 album by 9th Wonder

== See also ==
- The Dream Merchants (disambiguation)
