= May the Lord Watch =

Studio album by Little Brother
- Released: August 20, 2019
- Recorded: October 2018 – August 2019
- Studio: The Autumn Attic; The Burlap Place; Raleigh, North Carolina
- Length: 37:15
- Label: Imagine Nation; For Members Only; Empire
- Producer: Khrysis; Nottz; Focus...; Black Milk; King Michael Coy; Blaaq Gold; Phonte; Abjo; Zo!; Devin Morrison

Little Brother chronology
| Leftback LP (2010) | May the Lord Watch (2019) |

May the Lord Watch is the fifth and final studio album by American hip-hop duo Little Brother. It was released on August 20, 2019 by Imagine Nation Music, For Members Only Records and Empire Distribution.

The album is the duo's first album since 2010's Leftback release.

== Background ==
The album's development secretly began during the previous year of 2018, after Rapper Big Pooh, Phonte and 9th Wonder reunited during September's Art of Cool festival. However, this wasn't made public until shortly after Big Pooh and Phonte announced the group's reunion as a duo in May 2019. Like the previous album Leftback, there was no production input from 9th, who departed the group to embark on a solo career as a producer and label CEO. Instead, the album was primarily produced by longtime collaborators and Soul Council members Nottz and Khrysis. Other producers such as Black Milk, Focus..., Devin Morrison, Blaaq Gold, and even Phonte himself also contributed to the album's production. Sharing continuity with The Minstrel Show, the album's theme continues the running concept of a fictional television network called UBN, which is a satire of stereotypical programs, advertisements, and pop-culture for African Americans. A notable moment on the album was a skit from Peter Rosenberg announcing the death of Phonte's alter-ego Percy Miracles ( previously appeared on The Minstrel Show album track "Cheatin'"), which served as a tribute to Phife Dawg, and how his death was a significant moment that brought Phonte and Pooh back together.

In multiple interviews and podcasts - including the Premium Pete Show - it was revealed that 9th Wonder was originally supposed to be a part of the reunion album, under its original title Homecoming. The title was changed due to Beyonce releasing Homecoming: The Live Album to coincide with her concert film Homecoming. Phonte and Pooh decided to continue the project without 9th after a series of creative differences, mostly regarding production for the album.

== Critical reception ==
Professional ratings
Aggregate scores
| Source | Rating |
|---|---|
| Metacritic | 86/100 |
Review scores
| Source | Rating |
| AllMusic | 4/5 stars |
| Exclaim! | 8/10 |
| HipHopDX | 4.5/5 stars |
| Tom Hull – on the Web | B+ |

May the Lord Watch was met with universal acclaim reviews from critics. At Metacritic, which assigns a weighted average rating out of 100 to reviews from mainstream publications, this release received an average score of 86, based on 5 reviews.

== Track listing ==
Credits adapted from istandard producers

| No. | Title | Writer(s) | Producer(s) | Length |
|---|---|---|---|---|
| 1. | "The Feel" | Phonte Coleman; Thomas Jones III; Christopher Tyson; Alan Hawkshaw | Khrysis | 2:43 |
| 2. | "A Word from the President" | Devin Morrison | Morrison | 0:58 |
| 3. | "Everything" | Coleman; Jones III; Tyson; John McLaughlin; Narada Michael Walden | Khrysis | 3:41 |
| 4. | "Right on Time" | Coleman; Jones III; Dominick Lamb | Nottz | 3:16 |
| 5. | "Black Magic (Make It Better)" | Coleman; Jones III; Bernard Edwards, Jr.; Jairus Mozee; Brandon Anderson; Kadhja Bonet; Dexter Mills | Focus... | 2:34 |
| 6. | "Life After Blackface" | Coleman; Jones III; Lorenzo Ferguson | Zo! | 0:40 |
| 7. | "Goodmorning Sunshine" | Coleman; Jones III; Edwards, Jr.; Roger Powell; Kasim Sulton | Focus... | 4:00 |
| 8. | "Dyana Change My Life" | Coleman; Ferguson | Zo!; Phonte | 0:37 |
| 9. | "What I Came For" | Coleman; Jones III; Tyson | Khrysis; Phonte | 3:00 |
| 10. | "Inside the Producer's Studio" | Coleman | Zo! | 1:03 |
| 11. | "Sittin' Alone" | Coleman; Jones III; Lamb; Bobby Caldwell; Bruce Malament; Norman Harris | Nottz; Phonte | 3:14 |
| 12. | "Picture This" | Coleman; Jones III; Curtis Cross; William Miller; Eric Mercer, Jr. | Black Milk | 3:55 |
| 13. | "Niggas Hollering" | Coleman; Jones III; Aaron Christopher Nash | Abjo | 0:49 |
| 14. | "All in a Day" | Coleman; Jones III; Michael Redict | King Michael Coy | 3:50 |
| 15. | "Work Through Me" | Coleman; Jones III; Trevor Payne; Edwards, Jr. | Blaaq Gold; Focus... | 2:57 |
| Total length: | | | | 37:15 |

=== Samples ===
- "The Feel" contains a sample of "A Man Alone", as performed by Alan Hawkshaw
- "Everything" contains a sample of "In My Life", as performed by Mahavishnu Orchestra
- "Black Magic (Make It Better)" contains a sample of "The Chase", as performed by Anderson .Paak
- "Goodmorning Sunshine" contains a sample of "Eternal Love", as performed by Utopia
- "Sittin' Alone" contains a sample of "Open Your Eyes", as performed by Bobby Caldwell

== Personnel ==
- Phonte - writer, performer, recording engineer, mixing, additional background vocals, executive producer
- Rapper Big Pooh - writer, performer, executive producer
- Peter Rosenberg - voice
- Questlove - voice
- Jemele Hill - voice
- Laiya St. Clair - voice
- Joe Scudda - voice
- Evan Pollock - voice
- Dyana Williams - voice
- Jermaine White - voice
- Devon Moore - voice
- Ryan Davis - voice
- Austin Hall - voice
- Cesar Comanche - voice
- BlakkSoul - writer, background vocals
- Darien Brockington - background vocals
- Carlitta Durand - background vocals
- Shana Tucker - background vocals
- Madison McFerrin - background vocals
- Kristi Ae - background vocals
- Tamisha Waden - background vocals
- Be My Fiasco - background vocals
- Carmen Rodgers - background vocals
- Lorenzo "Zo!" Ferguson - keys, additional keys, additional synths
- Sheldon Williams - keys and synths
- Nottz - drums, bass
- Nicolay - keys
- Howard "Soul" Joyner - keys
- Chris Boerner - recording, mixing, mastering
- Antoine Lyers - photography
- Tobias Rose - graphic layout, design
- Deborah Mannis-Gardner (DMG Clearances, Inc) - sample clearance

== Charts ==
| Chart | Peak position |
|---|---|
| US Independent Albums (Billboard) | 11 |
