= God's Stepson =

Remix album by 9th Wonder
- Released: 2003
- Recorded: 2001–2002 (vocals); 2003 (production)
- Genre: Hip hop
- Length: 42:50
- Producer: 9th Wonder

9th Wonder chronology
God's Stepson (2003)	The Dream Merchant Vol. 2 (2007)

Professional ratings
Review scores
Source	Rating
MV Remix	(8/10)

God's Stepson is an album by hip hop producer 9th Wonder (formerly one third of the group Little Brother). It was an unofficial remix of Nas's God's Son album of 2002.

== Background ==
Released through internet outlets in 2003, the album began the trend for homemade remix projects, which reached fever pitch with Jay-Z's The Black Album remixes (of which 9th also submitted an entry). It was well received by critics and fans alike for its re-interpretation of what many considered to be a return-to-form album from Nas. In particular, the album is responsible for popularizing remixes of whole albums back-to-front, and also for establishing 9th Wonder amongst the premier league of hip hop producers.

9th Wonder didn't create the mix with a view to generate a buzz or promote his skills saying, "I didn't even think anybody was going to hear it". When asked by HitQuarters what inspired the remix he said: "I think all of us at one point want to hear Nas on something different. His voice is like another instrument on a track."

The album was excellently received, and served as a catalyst for 9th, sweeping "the industry off their feet".

== Track listing ==
No.	Title	Length
1.	"Get Down"	3:55
2.	"The Cross"	3:12
3.	"Made You Look"	4:00
4.	"Last Real Nigga Alive"	5:09
5.	"Hey Nas"	4:31
6.	"I Can"	4:18
7.	"Book Of Rhymes"	3:12
8.	"Thugz Mansion (NYC)"	2:43
9.	"Mastermind"	3:35
10.	"Warrior Song"	4:19
11.	"Revolutionary Warfare"	3:41
12.	"Ether"	5:15
Total length:		47:50

== Samples ==
- "Get Down" contains a sample from "You're a Friend of Mine" by The Meters
- "The Cross" contains a sample from "Beautiful Man of Mine" by Phyllis Hyman
- "Made U Look" outro contains a sample from "Broken Wing Bird" by The 5th Dimension
- "Last Real Nigga Alive" contains a sample from "Moves" by Doug Hammond
- "Hey Nas" contains a sample from "I'd Like To Be Baby To You" by Roberta Flack
- "I Can" contains a sample from "Break It Down" by Curtis Mayfield
- "Book Of Rhymes" contains a sample from "You'll Always Be Mine" by The Impressions
- "Thugz Mansion (NYC)" contains a sample from "It's Madness" by Marvin Gaye
- "Mastermind" contains a sample from "Scarborough Fair" by Sérgio Mendes
- "Revolutionary Warfare" contains a sample from "Let Me Make Love To You" by The O'Jays
- "Ether" contains a sample from "Hey, What's That You Say" by Brother To Brother
