= Black Is Back! =

Remix album by 9th Wonder
- Released: 2004
- Genre: Hip hop
- Length: 56:06
- Producer: 9th Wonder

9th Wonder chronology
Black Is Back! (2004)	The Dream Merchant Vol. 2 (2007)

Black Is Back! is a remix album by hip hop producer 9th Wonder, released in 2004. It is an unofficial remix of Jay-Z's 2003 The Black Album. The Village Voice placed it on their list of the best Black Album's remixes.

== Track listing ==
No.	Title	Length
1.	"Interlude"	2:14
2.	"December 4th"	4:14
3.	"What More Can I Say"	3:39
4.	"Encore"	4:15
5.	"Dirt Off Your Shoulder"	4:31
6.	"Threat"	5:23
7.	"Moment Of Clarity"	4:02
8.	"99 Problems"	4:05
9.	"Interlude"	2:49
10.	"Justify My Thug"	3:44
11.	"Lucifer"	3:12
12.	"Allure"	4:36
13.	"My First Song"	4:48
14.	"Threat (Remix)"	4:34
Total length:		56:06
