= The Commercial Free EP =

Live album by Little Brother
- Released: 2006
- Recorded: October 9, 2005
- Venue: Record Exchange in Raleigh, North Carolina
- Genre: Hip-hop
- Label: ABB/Atlantic Records
- Producer: 9th Wonder; Khrysis

Little Brother chronology
| The Minstrel Show (2005) | The Commercial Free EP (2006) | Getback (2007) |

Professional ratings
Review scores
| Source | Rating |
|---|---|
| RapReviews.com | link |

The Commercial Free EP is a live album recorded by North Carolina hip-hop group, Little Brother, in Raleigh, North Carolina on October 9, 2005, and released in 2006. Many of its tracks were included on Little Brother's 2005 album, The Minstrel Show, but some are brand new. The album has an anti-music industry sentiment and discusses various topics such as how they have to create three more tracks for the Japanese versions of their albums on "The Japanese People Never Took It".

== Track listing ==
Tracks 10–14 are described as "Bonus Outtakes & Bloopers" within the album's information booklet and are not songs.

| # | Title | Songwriters | Producer(s) | Performer (s) |
|---|---|---|---|---|
| 1 | "Words From The Champ (Intro)" | | | *Intro* |
| 2 | "Watch Me" | P. Coleman, T. Jones, C. Tyson, V. Basemore, H. Cosby, S. May | 9th Wonder | Little Brother |
| 3 | "The Olio" | P. Coleman, T. Jones, P. Douthit, L. Clifford, C. Mayfield | 9th Wonder | L.E.G.A.C.Y., Little Brother |
| 4 | "Slow It Down" | P. Coleman, T. Jones, P. Douthit, C. Curtis Gadson, R. Sanders, R. Sanders | 9th Wonder | Darien Brockington, Little Brother |
| 5 | "A Dedication To Louis Giron (Break)" | | | *Interlude* |
| 6 | "Hold On (Tellin' Me)" | *Uncredited* | 9th Wonder | Little Brother |
| 7 | "The Becoming/Sincerely Yours/Effabeat Medley" | P. Coleman, P. Douthit, T. Dulain/T. Jones, P. Douthit, T. Callier, L. Wade | 9th Wonder | Little Brother |
| 8 | "Lovin' It" | P. Coleman, T. Jones, P. Douthit, J. Griffin, R. Joyce, V. Pike, T. Randazzo | 9th Wonder | Joe Scudda, Little Brother |
| 9 | "Still Lives Through" | P. Coleman, T. Jones, P. Douthit | 9th Wonder | Little Brother |
| 10 | "A Word From Our Sponsors" | | | |
| 11 | "Shawn Boog, Smoothie Champ/Leg's Late Arrival" | | | |
| 12 | "The Japanese People Never Took It" | | | |
| 13 | "From Darien To D. Brock" | | | |
| 14 | "Joe Scudda, The Sellout" | | | |

== Samples ==
Watch Me

- "With A Child's Heart" as performed by Michael Jackson; written by Victoria Basemore, Henry Cosby and Sylvia May

The Olio

- "Ain't No Love Last" as performed by Curtis Mayfield; written by Linda Clifford and Curtis Mayfield

Slow It Down

- "Slow Dance" as performed by David Ruffin; written by C. Curtis Gadson, Rosslyn Sanders and Rollin Sanders

Hold On (Tellin' Me)

- "Sitting On The Edge Of My Mind" as performed by Jermaine Jackson; written by Garfield, Fletcher, O'Hara and O'Hara

The Becoming

- "Circles" as performed by Rufus & Chaka Khan; written by Tom Dulaine

Sincerely Yours

- "Whatever Goes Around" as performed by Jerry Butler; written by T. Callier and L. Wade

Lovin' It

- "One Night Affair" as performed by The Stylistics; written by R. Joyce, V. Pike and T. Randazzo

Still Lives Through

- "Oh My God" by A Tribe Called Quest and Busta Rhymes (Vocals by Busta Rhymes)
