= Laundry day =

Laundry day or variation, may refer to:

- A day to do laundry
- Laundry Day (film), a 2016 U.S. film
- Laundry Day (band), a U.S. band formed in 2017
- "Laundry Day" (song), a Weird Al Yankovic song cut from the 1996 album Bad Hair Day
- "Laundry Day" (song), a 2016 Mac Miller song, see Mac Miller production discography
- "Laundry Day" (song), a 2017 Nottz song, see Nottz production discography
- Laundry Day (TV series), a South Korean TV show on OnStyle
- "Laundry Day" (episode), a season 1 episode of Masha and the Bear
- "Laundry Day" (episode), a 1993 episode of The Vacant Lot
- "Laundry Day" (episode), a 2003 episode of The Weekenders, see List of The Weekenders episodes
- "Laundry Day" (episode), a 2013 episode of Teen Titans Go!, see List of Teen Titans Go! episodes
- "Laundry Day!" (episode), a 2012 episode of The Aquabats! Super Show!, see List of The Aquabats! Super Show! episodes
- "It's Laundry Day!" (episode), an episode of Crayon Shin-chan, see List of Crayon Shin-chan episodes
- "It's Laundry Day!" (episode), a 2013 episode of Splatalot

== See also ==
- Day (disambiguation)
