= The Delightful Bars =

Studio album by Rapper Big Pooh
- Released: March 24, 2009
- Recorded: 2009
- Genre: Hip-hop
- Length: 42:32; 46:24 (iTunes Bonus Track version)
- Label: Hall of Justus
- Producers: 9th Wonder; Khrysis; Thomas Jones; Jake One

Rapper Big Pooh chronology
Sleepers (2005)	The Delightful Bars (2009)

The Delightful Bars is the second album by the North Carolina rapper Rapper Big Pooh. It was released for digital and retail versions on March 24, 2009, followed by other four versions, with different track lists and songs: "North American Pie" (included two different covers), "Belgian Chocolate", "Japanese Daifoku" and the iTunes exclusive track list. Produced by 9th Wonder and Khrysis, that helped in the production of his last album, Sleepers, added production of IllMind and others. Pooh also collaborated in the production, and wrote all the sounds, the musics with collaborations, has these parts in the song, written by the guest, these include Chaundon, Jay Rock, Darien Brockington, Torae among others.

== Track listing ==
There are several track lists from the album.

iTunes version
No.	Title	Producer(s)	Length
1.	"Intro"	Thomas Jones	0:15
2.	"The Release"	Illmind	2:50
3.	"Power" (featuring O. Dash)	Khrysis	3:28
4.	"The Comeback"	Khrysis	2:48
5.	"Radio"	Oh No	2:38
6.	"Hands Up" (featuring Chaundon & Roc C)	Khrysis	3:20
7.	"On The Real" (featuring Jozeemo & E. Ness)	Khrysis	3:50
8.	"Nothing Less" (featuring Ab-Soul, Jay Rock & K-Dot)	Young RJ	4:45
9.	"Move" (featuring Darien Brockington)	Phonix	3:19
10.	"Roll Call" (featuring Jozeemo, Chaundon & Joe Scudda)	The Co-Op	4:45
11.	"The Life" (featuring Mushinah)	Khrysis	4:00
12.	"Rearview Mirror"	9th Wonder	3:48
13.	"Outro" (iTunes only)	Thomas Jones	0:12

American Pie version
No.	Title	Producer(s)	Length
1.	"North American Pie" (intro)	Thomas Jones	0:15
2.	"The Comeback"	Khrysis	2:48
3.	"It's a Go" (featuring Torae)	Dae One	3:02
4.	"Nothing Less" (featuring Ab-Soul, Jay Rock & K-Dot)	Young RJ	4:45
5.	"C.O.D."	Mickey Free	3:52
6.	"Move" (featuring Darien Brockington)	Phonix	3:19
7.	"Something Like Stars" (featuring Big Treal)	Jake One	3:43
8.	"Step Up"	D.R.	3:45
9.	"Reality Check" (featuring Big Dho, D. Black & Mykestro)	Khrysis	4:01
10.	"Problems" (featuring Jozeemo)	Illmind	3:00
11.	"Amo a Su Papi de la Barra" (Skit)	Thomas Jones	0:13
12.	"Roll Call" (featuring Jozeemo, Chaundon & Joe Scudda)	The Co-Op	4:06
13.	"The Life" (featuring Mushinah)	Khrysis	4:00
14.	"Rearview Mirror"	9th Wonder	3:48
15.	"Empanada Norte Americana" (Outro)	Thomas Jones	0:12
