= Dream Merchant Vol. 1 =

Studio album by 9th Wonder
- Released: 2005
- Recorded: 1998–2004
- Label: Hall of Justus, 6 Hole, Caroline
- Producer: 9th Wonder

9th Wonder chronology
Dream Merchant Vol. 1 (2005)	The Dream Merchant Vol. 2 (2007)

Dream Merchant Vol. 1 is the solo debut album by producer 9th Wonder, formerly of Little Brother. Released in 2005 through 6 Hole Records, the album was initially made available as a promotional CD through a 3-disc set called National Mayhem which also contained the albums National Anthem by The Away Team and Project Mayhem by L.E.G.A.C.Y.. The album featured guest appearances from K. Hill, Joe Scudda, L.E.G.A.C.Y., Rapper Big Pooh, Median, Phonte, Defcon (now known as Sean Boog), Chaundon, Keisha Shontelle, Cesar Comanche, Kevikaze and more.

== Track listing ==
No.	Title	Length
1.	"A Letter To Sick L (1980–2001)" (performed by K. Hill featuring Keisha Shontelle)	4:57
2.	"Just Don't Speak" (performed by Joe Scudda, L.E.G.A.C.Y. & Rapper Big Pooh)	4:34
3.	"Median Alleviates the Drama" (performed by Median)	3:19
4.	"Speed" (performed by Phonte & Poohbear)	4:02
5.	"The U-Express" (performed by Defcon)	2:27
6.	"My People" (performed by Yung, Love Joy & Logic of Tyfu)	4:23
7.	"Fallen" (performed by Chaundon)	3:45
8.	"Mr. Dream Merchant" (performed by Poohbear from VA)	2:48
9.	"Almost Genuine" (performed by Defcon & Phonte)	4:53
10.	"Strained" (performed by Keisha Shontelle featuring Crisis)	5:43
11.	"Third Person" (performed by L.E.G.A.C.Y.)	3:51
12.	"The Addiction" (performed by Defcon)	2:45
13.	"Like Dat" (performed by Phonte & Cesar Comanche)	2:27
14.	"Soul Dojo" (performed by Kevikaze)	3:29
15.	"The Righteous Way to Go (4 the Jeeps)" (Instrumental)	4:28
16.	"Too Late" (performed by Phonte))	2:42
Total length:		60:33
