= Leftback (album) =

Studio album by Little Brother
- Released: April 20, 2010
- Recorded: 2007–2009; The Peanut Gallery; Chopp Shopp Studios; Durham, North Carolina
- Genre: Hip-hop, alternative hip-hop
- Length: 51:52
- Label: Hall of Justus, Traffic
- Producer: Denaun Porter, J.Bizness, Khrysis, King Karnov, Symbolyc One (S1), Caleb, Young RJ, Zo!

Little Brother chronology
| Getback (2007) | Leftback (2010) | May the Lord Watch (2019) |

Singles from Leftback
- 1. "Curtain Call" Released: 2010

Professional ratings
Review scores
| Source | Rating |
|---|---|
| AllMusic | 3.5/5 stars |
| HipHopDX | 3.5/5 stars |
| HipHopSite.Com | 3.5/5 stars |
| RapReviews | (7.5/10) |
| The Smoking Section | 3/5 stars |
| TheWordIsBond.com | (3.4/5) |
| Yoraps | (3.25/5) |

Leftback is the fourth studio album by Little Brother. It was released on April 21, 2010, via Hall of Justus Records.

== Background ==
During a May 2008 interview with hiphopgame.com, Rapper Big Pooh hinted that he and Phonte may never record another album together. "That's so far in the future. We don't know if we are even gonna do another Little Brother album at this point. We are working on our personal projects right now.[4] After this report, Phonte did announce another album--Leftback--but he also announced that the group would subsequently take a Black Star-esque hiatus, wherein he and Big Pooh will collaborate, but another group album will not be released for a long while[5]. Recently, former group member 9th Wonder mentioned through his Twitter that "A Little Brother album doesn't sound like a bad idea these days man, people are leaving, you just don't know..", stemming from the passing of the former member of Slum Village Baatin.

Most recently, Rapper Big Pooh posted a bulletin via MySpace stating that he, along with 9th Wonder and Phonte, are no longer doing features as a group, but that he was still available to do solo features as himself. In the same post, he also mentioned that Leftback was near the end of the completion process.

On March 27, 2010, Phonte and 9th Wonder fought through Twitter over a beat that 9th Wonder produced and did not want on the album Leftback.

The album was leaked on April 9. Early reviews of the album rated it beneath the level of their earlier work.

== Commercial performance ==
The album sold 4,600 copies in its first week; it debuted at #128 on the Billboard 200.

== Track listing ==
| No. | Title | Writer(s) | Producer(s) | Length |
|---|---|---|---|---|
| 1. | "Curtain Call" | Phonte Coleman, Thomas Jones, Christopher Tyson | Khrysis | 3:12 |
| 2. | "Table For Two" (featuring Jozeemo & Yahzarah) | Phonte Coleman, Thomas Jones, Joseph Murdock, Christopher Tyson | Khrysis | 4:38 |
| 3. | "Tigallo For Dolo" | Phonte Coleman, Christopher Tyson | Khrysis | 2:55 |
| 4. | "Revenge" (featuring Truck North & Median) | Phonte Coleman, Thomas Jones, Jamal Miller, James Livingston, Christopher Tyson | Khrysis | 4:35 |
| 5. | "So Cold" (featuring Chaundon) | Phonte Coleman, Thomas Jones, Finian St. Omer, M. Redict | King Karnov | 4:15 |
| 6. | "Second Chances" (featuring Bilal and Darien Brockington) | Phonte Coleman, Thomas Jones, Bilal Oliver, Denaun Porter | Mr. Porter | 4:05 |
| 7. | "Go Off Go On" | Phonte Coleman, Thomas Jones, Christopher Tyson | Khrysis | 2:54 |
| 8. | "What We Are" (featuring Quiana) | Thomas Jones, Quiana Russau, Ralph Rice, Jr. | Young RJ | 3:50 |
| 9. | "After The Party (S1 and Caleb's Who Shot JR Ewing Remix)" (featuring Carlitta Durand) | Phonte Coleman, Thomas Jones, Christopher Tyson | S1 and Caleb | 4:20 |
| 10. | "Two Step Blues (Zo!'s Purple Suit With The Matching Gators Remix)" (featuring Darien Brockington) | Phonte Coleman, Thomas Jones, Dominick Lamb | Zo! | 4:28 |
| 11. | "Get Enough Pt. 2" (featuring Khrysis) | Phonte Coleman, Thomas Jones, Christopher Tyson | Khrysis | 4:19 |
| 12. | "Before The Night Is Over" | Phonte Coleman, Thomas Jones, J. Moore | J. Bizness | 4:24 |
| 13. | "24" (featuring Torae) | Phonte Coleman, Thomas Jones, Torae Carr, Christopher Tyson | Khrysis | 3:57 |

== Personnel ==
Credits adapted from liner notes.

- Mischa "Big Dho" Burgess - executive producer, art direction
- Phonte - writer, performer, recording engineer, mixing, addiditonal background vocals, executive producer
- Rapper Big Pooh - writer, performer, executive producer
- Khrysis - recording engineer, mixing, producer
- Soiree Records - mastering
- Milosz Wachowiak - art direction, graphic design
