= The Dream Merchants =

The Dream Merchants may refer to:

- The Dream Merchants (novel), a 1949 American novel by Harold Robbins
- The Dream Merchants (miniseries), a 1980 television miniseries based on the novel

== See also ==
- The Dream Merchant (disambiguation)
