= The Listening (Little Brother album) =

Studio album by Little Brother
- Released: February 25, 2003
- Recorded: 2001–2002
- Genre: Alternative hip-hop
- Length: 65:13
- Label: ABB
- Producers: 9th Wonder; Eccentric

Little Brother chronology
The Listening (2003)	The Minstrel Show (2005)

Singles from The Listening
- 1. "Speed" Released: August 2001; 2. "Whatever You Say" Released: November 26, 2002; 3. "The Way You Do It" Released: May 20, 2003

The Listening is the debut album of North Carolina trio Little Brother. It was released on February 25, 2003, on ABB Records.

== Overview ==
As the main producer for the group, 9th Wonder's instrumentals consist of chopped and manipulated samples of old soul records, reminiscent of Pete Rock and DJ Premier. Complementing the backdrops are MC's Phonte and Rapper Big Pooh with their tag-team wordplay and raps. On "Speed", they rap about the pressures of working a regular job while trying to survive in the rat race, while on "Make Me Hot", they make fun of people who hassle them for beats and studio time. They also do some uncanny impressions of old-school era MC's on "So Fabulous".

The underlying theme of The Listening concerns the group's effort to engage their listeners on a deeper level, and their frustration at casual listeners who pay little attention to lyrics and content and simply want to hear a "hot song". The interludes are performed by the members of a fictional radio station called WJLR (Justus League Radio). On the last song, "The Listening", the group addresses the album's main theme directly: they abruptly stop the song, exchange dialogue, then restart.

== Critical reception ==
Professional ratings
Review scores
Source	Rating
AllMusic	3.5/5 stars
HipHopDX	4/5
Pitchfork	8.5/10
RapReviews	10/10
The Source	4/5 stars
Vibe	3.5/5 stars
Village Voice	(dud)

AllMusic generally praised the album, concluding that it "a finely crafted musical document, composed by artists who want nothing more than to provide even just a glimpse of hip-hop purity within an ever-expanding maze of cultural deterioration." HipHopDX praised the album's consistent quality, in that the music worked best in the album format, and the message was lessened when the listener skipped tracks.

In 2022, Rolling Stone placed The Listening at number 142 on their list of the 200 Greatest Hip-Hop Albums of All Time. The magazine's writer Will Dukes said that the group provided an antidote to those consumed by "the mainstream's fixation on 50 Cent's bad-guy persona". He added that their debut is "full of humble humor, deft rhymes, and succulent beats that hit your palate like a cooked-to-perfection full-course meal."

The album influenced future prominent hip hops acts like Kendrick Lamar and Drake.

== Track listing ==
No.	Title	Producer(s)	Length
1.	"Morning" (Chaundon)	9th Wonder	0:45
2.	"Groupie, Pt. 2" (Big Pooh)	9th Wonder	2:58
3.	"For You" (Phonte, Big Pooh)	9th Wonder	3:03
4.	"Speed" (Phonte, Big Pooh)	9th Wonder	3:57
5.	"Whatever You Say" (Big Pooh, Phonte)	9th Wonder	5:27
6.	"Make Me Hot" (Phonte)	9th Wonder	1:36
7.	"The Yo-Yo" (Big Pooh, Phonte)	9th Wonder	3:35
8.	"Shorty on the Lookout" (Phonte, Big Pooh, Median)	9th Wonder	5:24
9.	"Love Joint Revisited" (Phonte, Big Pooh)	9th Wonder	4:25
10.	"So Fabulous" (Phonte, Big Pooh)	9th Wonder	4:43
11.	"The Way You Do It" (Phonte, Big Pooh)	9th Wonder	4:32
12.	"Roy Lee, Producer Extraordinaire" (Phonte, 9th Wonder)	9th Wonder	0:58
13.	"The Get-Up" (Phonte, Big Pooh)	Eccentric	3:17
14.	"Away from Me" (Big Pooh, Phonte)	9th Wonder	5:23
15.	"Nobody but You" (Big Pooh, Phonte, Keisha Shontelle)	9th Wonder	3:01
16.	"Home" (9th Wonder)	9th Wonder	2:49
17.	"Nighttime Maneuvers" (Phonte)	9th Wonder	3:03
18.	"The Listening" (Big Pooh, Phonte)	9th Wonder	6:07
