= Sleepers (album) =

Studio album by Rapper Big Pooh
- Released: February 8, 2005
- Recorded: December 2003–November 2004 (Heart of the City: Feb. 2003)
- Studio: Chopp Shopp Studios (Durham, North Carolina)
- Genre: Hip-hop
- Length: 45:14
- Label: 6 Hole; Caroline
- Producer: 9th Wonder; Big Dho; Khrysis; Nicolay

Rapper Big Pooh chronology
Sleepers (2005)	The Delightful Bars (2009)

Professional ratings
Review scores
Source	Rating
AllMusic	3/5 stars
IGN	8.3/10
Now	2/5 Ns
Pitchfork	6.7/10
RapReviews	8.5/10

Sleepers is the debut solo studio album by American rapper Big Pooh. It was released on February 8, 2005, via 6 Hole Records. Production was handled by 9th Wonder, Khrysis, Big Dho and Nicolay. It features guest appearances from O-Dash, Darien Brockington, Joe Scudda, Median, Murs, Phonte and Spectac, with contributions from KeKe, Tyesha and DJ Flash.

The album followed on the heels of his Little Brother groupmate Phonte's 2004 album with The Foreign Exchange, Connected. It begins with an audio clip from film director Spike Lee's 1988 movie School Daze, and features a few audio excerpts from Christopher Nolan's 2002 film Insomnia throughout the album.

On July 3, 2012, Rapper Big Pooh released Sleepers: The Narcoleptic Outtakes on his label For Members Only, consisting of songs that didn't make the final track listing of Sleepers.

== Track listing ==
No.	Title	Writer(s)	Producer(s)	Length
1.	"Wake Up"			0:05
2.	"I Don't Care"	Thomas Jones; Christopher Tyson	Khrysis	2:32
3.	"Strongest Man"	Jones; Patrick Douthit	9th Wonder	2:34
4.	"Heart of the City"	Jones; Douthit	9th Wonder	3:32
5.	"Every Block" (featuring Phonte)	Jones; Phonte Coleman; Douthit	9th Wonder	3:27
6.	"Just Friends"	Jones; Tyson	Khrysis	3:48
7.	"Live Life" (featuring Spectac and O-Dash)	Jones; Mervin Jenkins; DeMario Bratcher; Tyson	Khrysis	4:10
8.	"My Mind" (featuring O-Dash and Darien Brockington)	Jones; Bratcher; Darien Brockington; Tyson	Khrysis	4:20
9.	"Dash's Interlude" (featuring O-Dash)	Bratcher; Matthijs Rook	Nicolay	1:17
10.	"Scars" (featuring Joe Scudda and Median)	Jones; Joseph Griffen; James Livingston; Douthit	9th Wonder	4:23
11.	"Between the Lines"	Jones; Douthit; Mischa Burgess	9th Wonder	2:54
12.	"The Jungle"	Jones; Burgess	Big Dho	3:32
13.	"Now" (featuring Murs)	Jones; Nicholas Carter; Douthit	9th Wonder	4:33
14.	"The Fever"	Jones; Tyson	Khrysis	4:07
Total length:				45:14

Notes

- "Now" is a remix of "Keep the Bling" by Rapper Big Pooh, which was originally produced by Khrysis. This song would later appear on the Triple Play EP by the Justus League collective.

== Personnel ==
- Thomas "Rapper Big Pooh" Jones — vocals, executive producer, art direction
- Phonte Coleman — vocals (track 5), vocal arrangement (track 12)
- Mervin "Spectac" Jenkins — vocals (track 7)
- DeMario "O-Dash" Bratcher — vocals (tracks: 7–9)
- Darien Brockington — additional vocals & arrangement (track 8)
- Joseph "Joe Scudda" Griffen — vocals (track 10)
- James "Median" Livingston — vocals (track 10)
- KeKe — additional vocals (track 12)
- Tyesha — additional vocals (track 12)
- Nicholas "Murs" Carter — vocals (track 13)
- DJ Flash — scratches (track 2)
- Christopher "Khrysis" Tyson — producer (tracks: 2, 6–8, 14), recording & mixing (tracks: 2, 3, 6–9, 13, 14)
- Patrick "9th Wonder" Douthit — producer (tracks: 3–5, 10, 11, 13), recording & mixing (tracks: 5, 10), additional mixing (track 4), additional recording (track 12), remixing (track 13)
- Matthijs "Nicolay" Rook — producer (track 9)
- Mischa "Big Dho" Burgess — producer (track 12), recording & mixing (tracks: 4, 11, 12), executive producer, art direction, management
- Dave Kutch — mastering
- Christopher Gregory — art direction, design
- Brightladesigns.com — design, photography
- Jati Lindsay — photography
- Kimberly Wu — photography
- Nick Sciorra — legal
