= Kaze (rapper) =

American rapper

Kaze (pronounced kah-zee), real name Kevin Clarence Thomas, is a rapper from Durham, North Carolina.

== Biography ==
Thomas was born on Fort Belvoir, and grew up in nearby Dale City, Virginia. After spending many summers in North Carolina, he eventually moved to Richlands, North Carolina with his family in 1991, when he was in his early teens. He studied at the University of North Carolina, initially majoring in criminal justice, but switching to English, and then radio, television and motion pictures. Kaze's first claim to fame was as founder of the Hip-Hop Nation on-campus organization, aimed at promoting local MCs, DJs, poets, and graffiti artists. He followed this with the nationally syndicated television show Hip-Hop Nation in 2001, which he co-created and produced. He then started his own Soul Dojo record label, the first release on which was his 2003 debut album, Spirit of '94. The album was picked up by BCD Global Distribution later that year. He followed this with the Enemy of the State mixtape, featuring contributions from DJ Forge, L.E.G.A.C.Y., 9th Wonder and Nature, and a single "Move Over with Nature", featuring production from fellow North Carolina resident 9th Wonder. 9th Wonder remixed the beats from Kaze's debut, and it was re-issued as Spirit of '94 Version 9.0, with re-recorded vocals, released by Brick Records in the United States and Handcuts Records in Japan. Combined sales of Spirit of '94 and Enemy of the State totalled over 10,000 copies. In 2006, he signed to Rawkus Records, with his second album proper, Block 2the Basement released in 2008. He performed as part of the SXSW festival in 2007. In February 2009, he went on to become co-winner of the LOUD.COM Ultimate Rap Star contest, earning him a record deal with hip-hop business legend Steve Rifkind's SRC Records, distributed by Universal Motown. He joined forces with G-Unit/Shady's DJ Whoo Kid to release the "First in Flight" mixtape in September 2009.

Kaze founded the Sunday Night Sessions open-mic events in Chapel Hill, which he continued to co-host.

== Discography ==
=== Albums ===
- Spirit of '94 album (2003) Soul Dojo/BCD/Universal Japan
- Spirit of '94 Version 9.0 album (2005) Brick (Kaze & 9th Wonder)
- Block 2the Basement album (2008) Rawkus

=== Mixtapes ===
- Enemy of the State mixtape (2004) Soul Dojo
- Battleground Mixtape: Soul Dojo Edition (2006) Battleground/Soul Dojo (Kaze & DJ Battle)
- Word on the Street mixtape (2006) Vintage/Soul Dojo
- First in Flight aka 4Letters mixtape (2009) Street Records Corporation (Kaze & DJ Whoo Kid)
- Black Kennedy mixtape (2012) Sound of The Culture (Kaze, Dark Matter Productions, The Dem, D.R.U.G.S., E. Jones, Erv Ford, Family Biz Ent., Johnny Juliano, K. Slack, LaPhelle, M-Phazes, Skates, & Talent Ted)

=== Singles ===
- "Move Over With Nature" single
- "50/50 Amp" 12" single (2004) Brick
- "Last Laugh" 12" single (2004) Brick (Kaze & 9th Wonder)
