= The Minstrel Show =

Studio album by Little Brother
- Released: September 13, 2005
- Recorded: 2005
- Genre: Hip-hop; jazz rap
- Length: 53:31
- Label: Atlantic (compact disc); ABB Records (vinyl)
- Producer: 9th Wonder; Nicolay; Khrysis; Piano Reeves

Little Brother chronology
The Listening (2003)	The Minstrel Show (2005)	The Commercial Free EP (2006)

Singles from The Minstrel Show
- 1. "Lovin' It" Released: August 16, 2005; 2. "Slow It Down" Released: 2006

The Minstrel Show is the second studio album by American hip-hop trio Little Brother, released on September 13, 2005. It followed the critical success of their 2003 debut, The Listening. The album was highly anticipated and touted as a probable breakthrough for the group, even before its release. The title is a reference to the minstrel shows that were popular in the United States during the 19th century.

== Themes ==
The album has a running concept based on a fictional television network called "UBN" (U Black Niggas Network), which is a satire of stereotypical programs and advertisements for African Americans. For example, on "Cheatin", Phonte (performing under his alter-ego "Percy Miracles"), spoofs the over-dramatic R&B sagas performed by singers such as R. Kelly and Ronald Isley. Many of the skits contain tongue-in-cheek references to black pop-culture in the United States.

== Controversies ==
The controversy surrounding The Minstrel Show release drew more attention than the music itself. On August 16, 2005, Editor-in-Chief of The Source magazine, Joshua "Fahiym" Ratcliffe, announced his resignation due to conflicting opinions on the rating The Minstrel Show was supposed to receive in the next issue of the publication. According to Ratcliffe, after the review was finalized and the album's score was set to 4.5 out of 5, the magazine's Chief Brand Executive Raymond "Benzino" Scott and CEO Dave Mays announced their plans to reduce the score to 4. Benzino believed the album should not receive a higher score than Young Jeezy's Let's Get It: Thug Motivation 101, which received a rating of 4. For his part, Benzino admitted at the time of questioning, that he had yet to listen to the album for himself and had no problem with Ratcliffe's original rating. Little Brother's Phonte later remarked that the controversy brought more attention to the album than it could have received from the rating alone.

Another controversy was regarding the entertainment network BET (Black Entertainment Television), which refused to play the group's video for the single "Lovin' It", allegedly because they deemed it "too intelligent". Michael Lewellen, a publicist and program director for BET, responded, "It's not true, not in that context. BET reserves the right to show or not to show music videos of any type based on the network's own standards and decision-making processes." In an interview with GQ magazine, Phonte explained that BET never told them about the ban and he only found out about it on the Internet. In a portion of the video, the group lightly pokes fun at the different stylistic aspects of hip hop subgenres such as "gangsta", "backpack", "earthy" and "icy". The rest of it sees them performing to a zealous crowd.

== Reception ==
Professional ratings
Review scores
Source	Rating
AllMusic	4/5 stars
HipHopDX	4.5/5
Pitchfork	6.0/10
PopMatters	5/10
RapReviews	10/10
Rolling Stone	2.5/5 stars
Scratch	10/10
The Source	4.5/5 stars
USA Today	4/4 stars
Vibe	4/5 stars

The Minstrel Show received praise from contemporary hip hop publications, such as XXL magazine, who gave the album an "XL" rating, and Scratch magazine, who gave it a perfect 10 out of 10 rating. The Minstrel Show debuted at number 56 on the Billboard 200 chart, selling 18,000 copies in its first week. As of 2010, the album sold slightly more than 100,000 copies. A second official single and any further promotion of the album was abandoned by Atlantic Records, and although the group soon began recording their follow-up album, Getback, their relationship with the label drew to a close before its release.

== Track listing ==
Unless otherwise indicated, information is based on the album's liner notes.

#	Title	Producer(s)	Performer(s)	Time	Samples
1	"Welcome to the Minstrel Show"	9th Wonder	YahZarah; Chris Hardwick; Darien Brockington	1:17	"No Stronger Love" by The Floaters
2	"Beautiful Morning"	9th Wonder	Rapper Big Pooh; Phonte	2:20	"What's Happening, Baby?" by The Stylistics
3	"The Becoming"	9th Wonder	Phonte	2:05	"Circles" by Rufus & Chaka Khan
4	"Not Enough"	9th Wonder	Rapper Big Pooh; Phonte; Darien Brockington	4:30	"Easy, Easy, Got To Take It Easy" by Teddy Pendergrass
5	"Cheatin'"	Piano Reeves	Percy Miracles; Mr. Diggs	3:43	"Get Low" by Lil Jon & The Eastside Boyz with Ying Yang Twins
6	"Hiding Place"	9th Wonder	Rapper Big Pooh (also additional skit); Phonte; Elzhi; Additional Skit by Joe Scudda	4:00	"Jealous Love" by Bobby Womack
7	"Slow It Down"	9th Wonder	Rapper Big Pooh; Phonte; Darien Brockington	4:19	"Slow Dance" by David Ruffin
8	"Say It Again"	9th Wonder	Rapper Big Pooh; Phonte; Chaundon; Pamela Graham*	3:47	"Do Something Special (For Your Lady)" by The Five Special
9	"5th & Fashion (Skit)"	Nicolay	*Interlude*	1:19	
10	"Lovin' It"	9th Wonder	Rapper Big Pooh; Phonte; Joe Scudda; YahZarah*	3:51	"One Night Affair" by The Stylistics
11	"Diary of a Mad Black Daddy (Skit)"	9th Wonder	*Interlude*	0:40	Little Brother song "Lovin' It"
12	"All for You"	9th Wonder	Rapper Big Pooh; Phonte; Darien Brockington; Keyboards & Strings by James Poyser	4:39	"I Really Hope It's You" by Michael Franks
13	"Watch Me"	Khrysis	Rapper Big Pooh; Phonte; Khrysis; DJ Scratches by DJ Jazzy Jeff	4:19	"With a Child's Heart" by Michael Jackson
14	"Sincerely Yours"	9th Wonder	Rapper Big Pooh	3:15	"Whatever Goes Around" by Jerry Butler
15	"Still Lives Through"	9th Wonder	Rapper Big Pooh; Phonte	3:25	"God Lives Through" by A Tribe Called Quest
16	"Minstrel Show Closing Theme"	9th Wonder	YahZarah; Chris Hardwick	1:28	"No Stronger Love" by The Floaters
17	"We Got Now"	9th Wonder	Rapper Big Pooh; Phonte; Chaundon	4:34	"Caboclo" by Arthur Verocai
18	"Hold On (Tellin Me)" (Japanese and digital reissue bonus track)	9th Wonder	Rapper Big Pooh; Phonte	4:35	"Sitting on the Edge of My Mind" by Jermaine Jackson
19	"The Olio" (Japanese bonus track)	9th Wonder	L.E.G.A.C.Y. Phonte; Rapper Big Pooh	3:35	"Ain't No Love Lost" by Linda Clifford & Curtis Mayfield

Notes

(*) indicates the performer contributed additional background vocals to the track.

== Album samples songwriting credits ==
Information is based on the album’s Liner Notes
Welcome to the Minstrel Show and Minstrel Show Closing Theme

- "No Stronger Love" as performed by The Floaters; written by Arnold Ingram, James Mitchell and Marvin Willis

Beautiful Morning

- "What's Happening, Baby?" as performed by The Stylistics; written by George David Weiss, Hugo Peretti and Luigi Creatore

The Becoming

- "Circles" as performed by Rufus & Chaka Khan; written by Tim Dulaine (aka Tony Dulaine)

Not Enough

- "Easy, Easy, Got To Take It Easy" as performed by Teddy Pendergrass; written by Gene McFadden, John Whitehead and Victor Carstarphen

Hiding Place

- "Jealous Love" as performed by Bobby Womack; written by Bobby Womack and Cecil Womack

Slow It Down

- "Slow Dance" as performed by David Ruffin; written by C. Curtis Gadson, Rosslyn Sanders and Rollin Sanders

Say It Again

- "Do Something Special (For Your Lady)" as performed by Five Special; written by Jerry Q. Jones and Ron Banks

Lovin' It

- "One Night Affair" as performed by The Stylistics; written by Teddy Randazzo, Roger Joyce and Victoria Pike

All for You

- "I Really Hope It's You" as written and performed by Michael Franks

Watch Me

- "With a Child's Heart" as performed by Michael Jackson; written by Henry Cosby, Sylvia Moy and Victoria Basemore

Sincerely Yours

- "Whatever Goes Around" as performed by Jerry Butler; written by Terry Callier and Larry Wade

Hold On (Tellin' Me) (B-Side of "Lovin' It" single)

- "Sitting On The Edge Of My Mind" as performed by Jermaine Jackson; written by Garfield, Fletcher, O'Hara and O'Hara
