= Getback =

Studio album by Little Brother
- Released: October 23, 2007
- Recorded: 2007
- Studio: Chopp Shopp Studios, Durham, North Carolina
- Genre: Hip-hop
- Length: 48:37
- Label: ABB Records; E1 Entertainment Distribution
- Producer: 9th Wonder; Hi-Tek; Illmind; Khrysis; Mr. Porter; Nottz; Rashid Hadee; Zo!

Little Brother chronology
The Commercial Free EP (2006)	Getback (2007)	Leftback (2010)

Singles from Getback
- 1. "Good Clothes" Released: October 9, 2007; 2. "That Ain't Love" Released: December 30, 2007

Professional ratings
Review scores
Source	Rating
About.com	4/5 stars
Allmusic	4.5/5 stars
The A.V. Club	A−
HipHopDX.com	4/5 stars
RapReviews.com	(9/10)
Rolling Stone	2.5/5 stars
Slant Magazine	3/5 stars
XXL	(XL)
DJBooth.net	4/5 stars

Getback is the third studio album from Little Brother, released on October 23, 2007. Eleven days prior, Phonte leaked the album himself to Okayplayer.com

== Details ==
The group has confirmed the involvement of several outside producers, in addition to 9th Wonder. These include Nottz (who previously collaborated with the group on the Justus League album, Soldiers of Fortune), Illmind (who has contributed to their mixtape albums), Hi-Tek, and Denaun Porter. Low Budget producer, Oddisee was supposed to make a contribution, however, the group wrapped up the album before finally meeting up with him.

The songs recorded and confirmed include four Nottz produced songs, and four Illmind produced songs, along with one 9th Wonder produced song. This caused many to speculate about 9th Wonders' role within the group, some even suggesting that he may have left the group entirely. Asked for clarification, 9th responded:

I'm still part of the group and that's all I have to say. I'm big on what's in the group stays in the group. I've always said the same thing, I'm 9th Wonder of Little Brother and Phonte is the leader of Little brother. This is the direction the MCs have decided to take. I've only got one beat on the album for now and if I get more, I do and if I don't, I don't.

Fan reaction to this news has been mixed, with some welcoming the new changes, and many others calling for greater involvement from 9th. Nonetheless, the album still had an overall positive outlook from critics. In a drastic turn of events, the group announced in January, 2007 that they would be parting ways with both Atlantic Records, and their longtime producer 9th Wonder, due to creative differences but in both cases, on amicable terms. Rapper Big Pooh was quoted as saying:

Little Brother has decided, in the best interest of the group, for Little Brother and 9th Wonder to part ways. There are no hard feelings and no beef. This is just a decision that had to be made so all three of us could move forward and continue to provide the world with dope music.

== Track listing ==
No.	Title	Writer(s)	Producer(s)	Length
1.	"Sirens" (feat. Carlitta Durand)	P. Coleman; T. Jones; C. Durand; R. Ibanga, Jr.	Illmind
2.	"Can't Win For Losing"	P. Coleman; T. Jones; R. Ibanga, Jr.	Illmind
3.	"Breakin' My Heart" (feat. Lil Wayne)	P. Coleman; T. Jones; D.M. Carter Jr.; P. Douthit	9th Wonder
4.	"Good Clothes"	P. Coleman; T. Jones; R. Ibanga, Jr.	Illmind
5.	"After The Party" (feat. Carlitta Durand)	P. Coleman; T. Jones; C. Durand; C. Tyson	Khrysis
6.	"ExtraHard"	P. Coleman; T. Jones; D. Porter	Mr. Porter
7.	"Step It Up" (feat. Dion)	P. Coleman; T. Jones; D. Dawson; D. Jenkins; T. Cottrell	Hi-Tek
8.	"Two-Step Blues" (feat. Darien Brockington and S. Graham)	P. Coleman; T. Jones; D. Brockington; D. Lamb	Nottz
9.	"That Ain't Love" (feat. Jozeemo)	P. Coleman; T. Jones; J. Murdock; R. Ibanga, Jr.	Illmind
10.	"Dreams"	P. Coleman; T. Jones; J. Young	Rashid Hadee
11.	"When Everything Is New"	P. Coleman; T. Jones; L. Ferguson	Zo!
12.	"The Getaway" (iTunes bonus track)	P.Coleman; T. Jones; C. Tyson	Khrysis

Instrumental UK/Japan bonus track
No.	Title	Producer(s)	Length
13.	"Please Stand By" (UK/Japan only) (instrumental)	Zo!

Bonus tracks
No.	Title	Writer(s)	Producer(s)	Length
13.	"Next Day" (HipHopSite.com bonus track)	P.Coleman; T. Jones
14.	"System" (UK/Japan bonus track) (feat. Tone Trezure)	P.Coleman; T. Jones; L. Givens	Mr. Porter

== Personnel ==
- Design – Frank William Miller, Junior
- Executive-Producer – Beni B, Little Brother, Mischa "Big Dho" Burgess
- Mastered By – Dave Cheppa
- Recorded & Mixed By – Khrysis
- Photography By – Jati Lindsay
