= The Dream Merchant Vol. 2 =

Studio album by 9th Wonder
- Released: October 9, 2007
- Recorded: 2006–2007
- Genre: Hip-hop
- Length: 67:27
- Label: 6 Hole/Caroline
- Producer: 9th Wonder

9th Wonder chronology
Dream Merchant Vol. 1 (2005)	The Dream Merchant Vol. 2 (2007)	9th's Opus: It's A Wonderful World Music Group Vol. 1 (2010)

Singles from The Dream Merchant, Vol. 2
- 1. "Brooklyn In My Mind" Released: October 2006; 2. "So Sinsurr (non-album single)" Released: June 2007; 3. "Sunday!/The Last Time/Ya Hear Me" Released: October 2007

Professional ratings
Review scores
Source	Rating
The Austin Chronicle	4/5 stars
DJBooth	4/5 stars
Entertainment Weekly	B+
Hip Hop Connection	4/5 stars
Okayplayer	3.5/5 stars
Pitchfork	5.0/10
RapReviews	8/10
Spin	2.5/5 stars
XXL	(L)

The Dream Merchant Vol. 2 is the second compilation album from producer 9th Wonder, formerly of Little Brother. It was released on October 9, 2007 through Sixhole Records. The album has guest appearances by his former group, Little Brother, his fellow Justus League members, Sean Price, Big Dho, L.E.G.A.C.Y., Chaundon, Skyzoo, Keisha Shontelle, Big Treal, The A.L.L.I.E.S., Jozeemo, Tyler Woods, Joe Scudda, Buckshot, Sean Boog, D.O.X., O-Dash, Buddy Klein & Median, also outside performers (including some who 9th worked with) including Torae, Mos Def, Memphis Bleek, Jean Grae, Royce Da 5'9, Vandalyzm, Naledge (½ of Kidz in the Hall), Saigon, Camp Lo, Ness, Strange Fruit Project & Natural Born Spittas. The album also marks the debut of then-unknown MC, Rapsody.

== Track listing ==
All tracks are produced by 9th Wonder. Credits are adapted from album's liner notes.

No.	Title	Writer(s)	Length
1.	"Mr. Dream Merchant Intro"		1:12
2.	"Shots" (featuring Sean Price & Big Dho)	Patrick Douthit; Mischa Burgess; Sean Price	3:25
3.	"Merchant of Dreams" (featuring L.E.G.A.C.Y., Chaundon, Skyzoo and Torae)	Douthit; Finian Omer; Gregory Skyler Taylor; Kehinde Harper; Torae Carr	3:43
4.	"Brooklyn In My Mind (Crooklyn Dodgers III)" (featuring Mos Def, Memphis Bleek and Jean Grae)	Douthit; Dante Smith; Tsidi Ibrahim; Malik Cox	4:25
5.	"Sunday!" (featuring Keisha Shontelle & Chaundon)	Douthit; Keisha Hinnant; Omer	4:50
6.	"Baking Soda" (featuring Big Treal)	Douthit; Christopher Lilley	4:19
7.	"Reminisce" (featuring Novej and Big Remo the Great)	Douthit; Rashad Cash; Timothy McGuire	4:54
8.	"No Time to Chill" (featuring Little Brother)	Douthit; Phonte Coleman; Thomas Jones	3:01
9.	"It Ain't Over" (featuring Jozeemo and Tyler Woods)	Douthit; Joseph Murdock; Tyler Woods	2:54
10.	"The Last Time" (featuring Naledge, Royce da 5'9" and Vandalyzm)	Douthit; Ryan Montgomery; Van Coleman; Jabari Evans	5:09
11.	"Saved" (featuring Saigon and Joe Scudda)	Douthit; Brian Carenard; Joseph Griffen	3:04
12.	"The Milky Lowa" (featuring Camp Lo)	Douthit; Saladine Wallace; Salahadeen Wilds	3:35
13.	"Backlash" (featuring Sean Boog and Buckshot)	Douthit; Sean Evans; Kenyatta Blake	4:16
14.	"Thank You" (featuring D.O.X. and O-Dash)	Douthit; Angelo Robinson; DeMario Bratcher	3:57
15.	"Let It Bang" (featuring Skyzoo and Ness)	Douthit; Taylor; Lloyd Mathis	3:48
16.	"What Makes A Man" (featuring Rapper Big Pooh and Buddy Klein)	Douthit; Jones; Killian James	3:13
Total length:			59:45

Bonus tracks
No.	Title	Writer(s)	Length
17.	"Special (Remix)" (featuring Strange Fruit Project and Median)	Douthit; Larry Griffin; Anthony Ligawa; Kevin Gaither; James Livingston	3:24
18.	"You Wanna" (featuring NBS)	Douthit; Imam Bilal-Firmin; Rahim Muhammad	4:09
Total length:			67:27

== Samples ==
- "Mr. Dream Merchant (Intro)" contains samples from: "I'm Dreamin'" by Christopher Williams, "Juicy" by The Notorious B.I.G. with Total, "These Dreams" by Heart, "Dreams" by The Game and "Mr. Dream Merchant" by Jerry Butler.
- "Shots" contains samples from: "Turn Off the Lights" by Teddy Pendergrass and "And I Love Her" by Bobby Womack.
- "Merchants Of Dreams" contains samples from: "Love at First Sight" by The Stylistics, "Microphone Fiend" by Eric B. & Rakim and "Crooklyn" by The Crooklyn Dodgers.
- "Brooklyn In My Mind" contains samples from: "Love To Keep You In My Mind" by Curtis Mayfield, "Go Stetsa I" by Stetsasonic, "Juicy" by The Notorious B.I.G. with Total and "Crooklyn" by The Crooklyn Dodgers.
- "Sunday" contains samples from: "Back in the Day" by Ahmad and "Wings of My Love" by Michael Jackson.
- "Baking Soda" contains a sample of "What the World Knows" by Gene Page.
- "Reminisce" contains samples from: "Walkin' in the Rain with the One I Love" by Danny Pearson and "Whatever Goes Around" by Jerry Butler.
- "It Ain't Over" contains a sample of "Pardon Me" by Thelma Houston.
- "The Last Time" contains a sample of "The Weight" by Diana Ross & The Supremes with The Temptations.
- "Saved" contains samples from: "Can We Come and Share In Love" by Joe Simon and "Murder Was the Case" by Snoop Dogg and Daz Dillinger.
- "The Milky Lowa" contains samples from: "Together We Can Make Such Sweet Music" by The Spinners and "Rainbow on the Ground" by Creative Source.
- "Backlash" contains a sample of "Feet Don't Fail Me Now" by Denise LaSalle.
- "Thank You" contains a sample of "Thank You for the Moment" by Billy Eckstine.
- "Let It Bang" contains a sample of "I Intend to Take Your Place" by Bobby Bland.
- "What Makes a Man" contains a sample of "Woman" by James Brown.
- "Special Remix" is a remix of "Special" by Strange Fruit Project and Thesis
- "Special Remix" also contains samples from: "Touch" by The Jackson 5 and "Change the Beat (Female Version)" by Beside.

== Personnel ==
- Scratches - DJ Premier (4)
- Background Vocals [Additional] - Darien Brockington (4)
- A&R – 9th Wonder, Big Dho
- Art direction, design – Christopher Gregory
- Executive-Producer – Mischa "Big Dho" Burgess, Patrick "9th Wonder" Douthit*
- Management – Big Dho
- Mastered by – Square "SQ"
- Mixed by – 9th Wonder
- Mixed by [Additional] – Big Dho
- Photography by – Tobias Rose
