= Jeanius =

Studio album by Jean Grae
- Released: July 8, 2008
- Genre: Hip-hop
- Length: 49:37
- Label: Blacksmith
- Producer: 9th Wonder, Khrysis, Fatin

Jean Grae chronology
This Week (2004)	Jeanius (2008)	The Evil Jeanius (2008)

Jeanius is the third studio album by American rapper Jean Grae. She worked on it with hip hop producer 9th Wonder and intended to release it in 2004, but the album was leaked prematurely and spawned various pirated versions of the unfinished project. After Grae's record deal with the label, Jeanius was released on July 8, 2008, by Talib Kweli's Blacksmith Records.

== Background ==
Scheduled for release as early as 2004, the album was delayed for unknown reasons and has since been heavily bootlegged on the internet. The album was released on July 8, 2008, on Talib Kweli's Blacksmith music label. The booklet for the album contains faithful recreations of classic Hip Hop album covers, featuring images of Grae and 9th Wonder superimposed onto covers of Public Enemy's It Takes a Nation of Millions to Hold Us Back, Das EFX's Dead Serious, Raekwon's Only Built 4 Cuban Linx..., and Black Sheep's A Wolf in Sheep's Clothing.

== Critical reception ==
Professional ratings
Review scores
Source	Rating
AllMusic	4/5 stars
The A.V. Club	B
MSN Music (Consumer Guide)	A−
Pitchfork	8.3/10
RapReviews	9/10
Tiny Mix Tapes	3.5/5
Tom Hull – on the Web	B+
URB	4/5 stars

Andre Barnes of AllMusic called the album "a definitive body of work for both 9th Wonder and Jean Grae — Grae's wit and peculiar charisma are paired with 9th's soulful, sample-heavy production." Alexander F. Remington of The Washington Post felt that 9th Wonder is "not at his best, and as a result the album is merely great rather than classic", but concluded that Grae "proves that she's one of the best MCs alive" with Jeanius. XXL said that she connects with listeners on "an intimate level" with her honesty and "willingness to recount vivid details of painful, haunting past experiences". Pitchfork Media's Nate Patrin wrote that Grae's flow "sounds like a laser-focused, clear-spoken declaration of strength and perseverance", and praised 9th Wonder for tying together all of her "emotional facets" with a "solid, consistent sound".

Although he found its official release "a bit anticlimactic", Mosi Reeves of Spin felt that Grae's "sweet-and-sour lyricism ... still sounds remarkably vibrant", and found 9th Wonder to be "in top form, flipping Phoebe Snow and other soulful '70s samples with emotional fervor." Robert Christgau of MSN Music found her rhymes "jam-packed" and "infinitely smarter about her 'insecurities' and 'moodiness' than her shoegazer counterparts", and gave Jeanius an "A−". Christgau's colleague, Tom Hull, was somewhat less receptive. "Reacting more to the overall vibe", he said Grade is "smart and tight, although this [album] is a bit overwound [and] plagued with guests, who start to get on my nerves."

== Track listing ==
#	Title	Producer	Featured guest(s)	Time	Samples
1	"Intro"	9th Wonder		2:00	"Love Fire" by Syreeta
2	"2-32's"	9th Wonder	Daily Planet	4:07	"All Over" by Phoebe Snow
3	"Don't Rush Me"	9th Wonder	9th Wonder	4:14	"If You Leave Me Now / Love So Right" by Jerry Butler and Thelma Houston
4	"My Story"	9th Wonder		4:31	"I Have a Dream" by Norman Connors
5	"The Time Is Now"	9th Wonder	Phonte	3:43	"Larry's Theme" by Lawrence Hilton-Jacobs; "Solid" by Ashford & Simpson
6	"Billy Killer"	9th Wonder		3:54	"Uptown" by The Marvelettes
7	"Think About It"	9th Wonder		4:06	"Think About Me" by Marlena Shaw
8	"#8"	Khrysis		4:06	"What Are You Doing the Rest of Your Life?" by Shirley Bassey
9	"American Pimp"	Khrysis	Median	3:12	"How Can You Stop Loving Someone" by The Emotions; "Is This the Way Love’s Supposed to Be" by Sylvia Smith
10	"This World"	9th Wonder	9th Wonder	3:07	"If This World Were Mine" by Love Unlimited
11	"Love Thirst"	9th Wonder		5:44	"Station Break for Love" by Syreeta and G. C. Cameron; "High" by Skyy
12	"Desperada"	9th Wonder		3:31	"Tell Me How" by Gloria Gaynor
13	"Smashmouth"	Fatin	K Hill; Edgar Allen Floe; Joe Scudda	4:59	"Don't Mess with People" by Mandrill

== Personnel ==
Credits adapted from AllMusic.

- Jean Grae – primary artist
- Edgar Allen Floe – featured artist
- Median – featured artist
- Joe Scudda – featured artist
- 9th Wonder – featured artist, producer
- Phonte – featured artist
- Daily Planet – featured artist
- Berman Fenelus – photography

== Charts ==
Chart (2008)	Peak position
US Heatseekers Albums (Billboard)	40
US Top R&B/Hip-Hop Albums (Billboard)	71

== See also ==
- Love for Sale (Bilal album)
