= Little Brother (group) =

American hip-hop duo

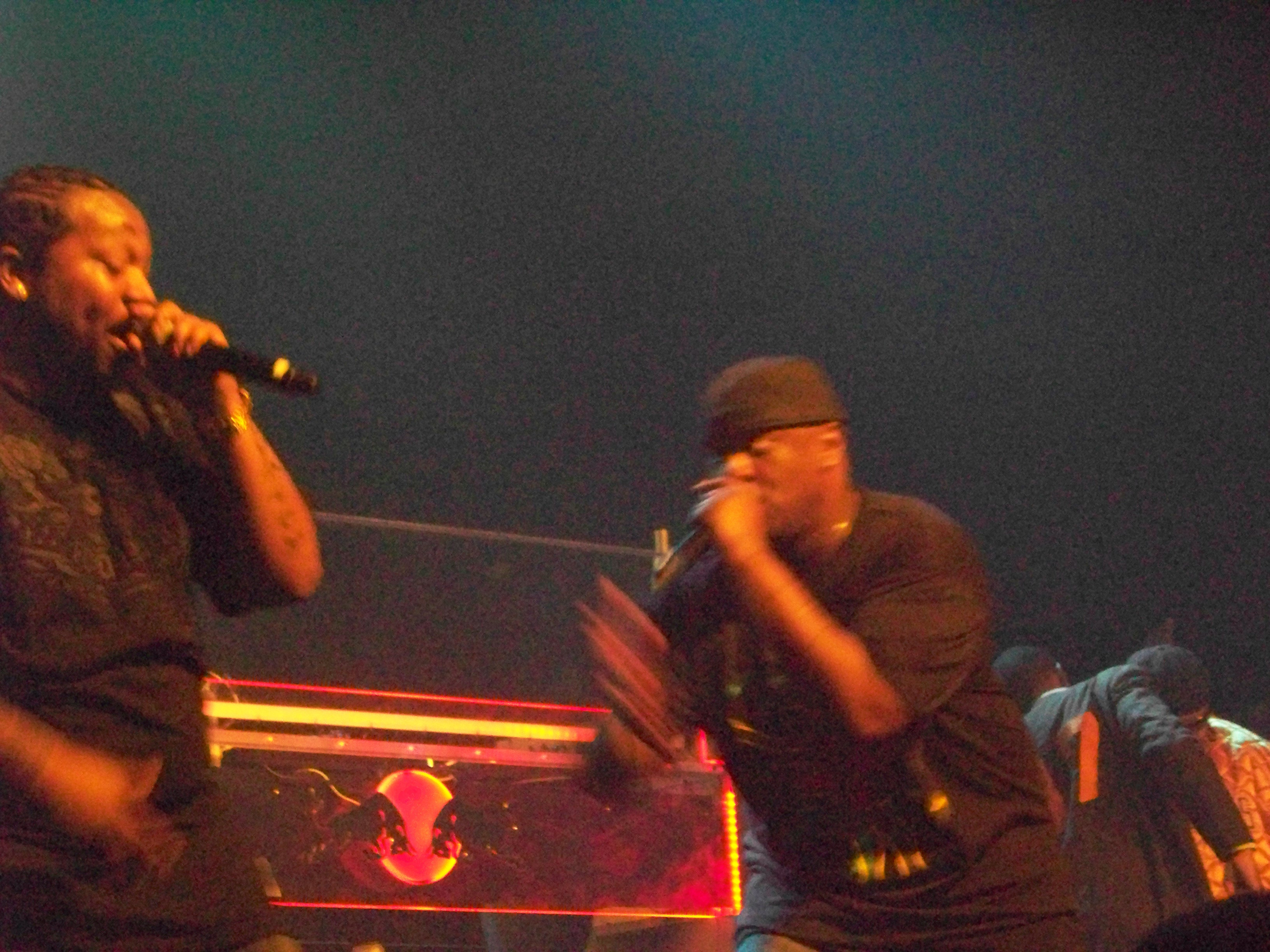
- Little Brother performing in Atlanta in 2008

Background information
- Origin: Durham, North Carolina, U.S.
- Genre: Alternative hip-hop
- Works: Little Brother discography
- Years active: 2001–2010; 2018–2025
- Labels: ABB; Atlantic; Empire
- Members: Phonte; Big Pooh
- Past members: 9th Wonder
- Website: littlebrothernc.com

Little Brother was an American hip-hop duo from Durham, North Carolina, that consists of rappers Phonte and Big Pooh. DJ and producer 9th Wonder was an original member of the group but departed in 2007. The group has produced five acclaimed studio albums and six mixtapes. Little Brother is highly regarded among hip-hop fans and critics.

== History ==
=== Early career and The Listening album ===
The individual members of the group, rappers Phonte (Phonte Coleman), and Rapper Big Pooh (Thomas Jones), and DJ/producer 9th Wonder (Pat Douthit), met in 1998 while enrolled as college students at North Carolina Central University in Durham, North Carolina. The group began as a trio. Little Brother were members of the North Carolina–based alternative hip-hop collective, Justus League.

In a February 2003 interview with MVRemix.com, Phonte explained the origins of the group's name:

Tribe, De La, Public Enemy ... were like our big brothers in the game so now we are the little brothers of that movement ... carrying on the tradition of good music.

The official debut for Little Brother came in August 2001 with their first recording, "Speed".

According to 9th Wonder in an interview with Complex, another rapper Median was actually supposed to be on the track before they got a hold of Big Pooh:

The Listening was done in Missie Ann. Cesar Comanche, who I met when I was attending North Carolina State University, lived not far from the school. He stayed in a two-bedroom apartment, and that's basically our studio Missie Ann. [Comanche] named it after his sister. And we pretty much did that album in Comanche's other room besides the bathroom. Every song on The Listening has a story to it, which is crazy. We started recording The Listening in August of 2001, which will make this August the ten-year anniversary when we started Little Brother. So the story goes like this. At the time Phonte was doing his 9 to 5 at Blue Cross Blue Shield Association, the insurance company, and he would come into the studio, and then going back to his 9 to 5, sometimes without even sleeping. That was a repeating fashion. One day, Phonte and I were doing a song called 'Speed.' Phonte did his part, and we took 'Take A Look' by Joc Max and Grap Luva, put out by DJ Spinna, which has a part that goes, 'I put my JBs on when I hustle with speed,' and I really loved that part, so I put that in there. We asked Median to be on it. He said he was down to do it, but on the weekend we wanted to record it, we couldn't find Median. Pooh, who was originally from Virginia, was in town at the time with his friends in Charlotte, North Carolina. Matter of fact, I think around March or April of 2001, Pooh asked Phonte to be a group, and Phonte said, 'No.' But Median wasn't around, so we were like, 'Let's just ask Pooh, he's in town.' So Pooh came in, and recorded the song, and we listened to the song like 18 times, and I looked at Phonte afterward and said, 'Let's try to be a group, man. Let's see what it sounds like.' Median could have been a member of Little Brother. 'Speed' was the first song we recorded as a group, because Median didn't show up. But we thought it sounded good, so we just said, 'Let's be a group.' And that's the first song in Little Brother's existence.

They continued to work the local, Raleigh Durham–area scene and were eventually signed by independent record label ABB Records. In 2002, they released the cult hit 7" single "Atari 2600", with lyrics centering on video games.

In 2003, the group released their first full-length studio album, The Listening to critical acclaim. National recognition for the group, and particularly 9th Wonder, came when Jay-Z tapped 9th Wonder for the song "Threat", from his eighth studio album The Black Album.

Following the release of The Listening, Little Brother opened for Oakland-based alternative hip-hop collective Hieroglyphics on the latter's Full Circle national tour.

On June 21, 2005, Little Brother released The Chittlin' Circuit 1.5, their first commercially distributed "mixtape". It featured the song "I See Now", by Consequence featuring Kanye West, which had originally appeared on the mixtape Take 'Em To The Cleaners.

=== The Minstrel Show album ===
Little Brother's second album, The Minstrel Show, released in September 2005, saw increased success for the group due to their raised popularity and praise for the album from critics. The album's theme compared present day rap music and the music industry to the minstrel shows of the late 19th century. A music video for the single, "Lovin' It" featuring Joe Scudda, was directed by Joey Boukadakis.

In 2005, Little Brother became embroiled in a short-lived feud, when Young Jeezy's protégé Slick Pulla challenged the group to a battle after hearing an interview in which Phonte voiced some disapproval concerning "drug rap" and Young Jeezy's "snowman mascot". Little Brother did not respond, and instead, Phonte called Slick Pulla and the pair resolved the misunderstanding.

=== Getback album and 9th Wonder's departure ===
In late 2006, Little Brother began recording their third album, and second for Atlantic Records, Getback. However, in January 2007, the group announced both their departure from Atlantic and that producer 9th Wonder had left the group.

The move from Atlantic was due to the commercial failure of The Minstrel Show, and creative differences over the group's future material. Big Pooh said:

We as a group just felt that it was not in our best interest to remain in a situation where our needs were constantly being overlooked. We didn't have an A&R for The Minstrel Show. We don't have any type of relationship with our current A&R. There are just a lot of internal issues that ended up working against us.

The group's manager Big Dho added that there were no "ill feelings towards their (Atlantic) company."

The group's reason for the break from Atlantic and for 9th Wonder's departure was ultimately due to creative differences, but in both cases, the break and departure were described as amicable.

As to 9th Wonder's departure from the group, Rapper Big Pooh was quoted as saying:

Little Brother has decided, in the best interest of the group, for Little Brother and 9th Wonder to part ways. There are no hard feelings and no beef. This is just a decision that had to be made so all three of us could move forward and continue to provide the world with dope music.

On October 23, 2007, Little Brother released Getback. With no major video or radio airplay, Getback sold approximately 9,600 copies during its first week in stores and landed at No. 89 on the Billboard 200 chart. The album consisted of 11 songs, and featured several guests, most notably New Orleans–based rapper Lil Wayne, who had been a longtime fan of the group's work and was invited to rap on the third verse for "Breakin My Heart".

Following the release of Getback in late 2007, Little Brother toured with Los Angeles–based alternative hip-hop artist Evidence of Dilated Peoples.

The remainder of 2007 found Little Brother working on becoming completely independent artists and putting out records on their own. Big Pooh told L.A. Record in an April 2008 interview that "For the next record, we definitely want ownership—the first record we'll have 100% ownership of."

=== ...And Justus For All mixtape ===
Following the release of Getback, in mid-2008, Little Brother officially released their 2007 mixtape ...And Justus For All with DJ Mick Boogie taking over production duties for the departed 9th Wonder. The mixtape was released through the Hall of Justus collective with Little Brother controlling the project.

In a June 2008 interview with HipHopDX.com, Big Pooh said:

We decided to officially release ...And Justus For All for the fans. Since all of our mixtapes are more like actual albums, many people have been requesting us for deejay free versions of these mixtapes. So to all of the fans out there that's been asking for it, you're welcome!

...And Justus For All featured 5 new songs as well as enhanced mastered versions of songs on their 2007 mixtape with DJ Mick Boogie. The CD version contained five new songs for the album and the iTunes version had seven new songs. The iTunes version linked former groupmate 9th Wonder to the group with the single, "Black Light Special".

=== Individual member side projects ===
Outside of Little Brother, Phonte began a collaboration with Netherlands-based producer Nicolay as the group The Foreign Exchange, that ultimately resulted in the release of their debut album, Connected, in 2004. The Foreign Exchange released their follow-up album entitled Leave It All Behind, in October 2008.

Big Pooh released a solo album entitled Sleepers in 2005. In 2009, he released two albums, The Delightful Bars, and Rapper's Delight. In early 2010, Big Pooh released The Purple Tape mixtape as a free download. This mixtape featured Big Pooh rhyming over Detroit-based producer Black Milk's instrumentals from a collection that sampled Prince's album Purple Rain.

9th Wonder has produced songs for major artists like Jay-Z, De La Soul, Kendrick Lamar, Wale and Destiny's Child, as well as underground artists such as Sean Price and Rapsody. 9th Wonder has produced entire, full-length studio albums for Jean Grae (Jeanius), Murs (Murs 3:16: The 9th Edition, Murray's Revenge, Sweet Lord and The Final Adventure, just to name a few), Buckshot (Chemistry and The Formula), as well as a remix album of Nas' God's Son entitled God's Stepson.

=== Leftback album, hiatus, and disbandment ===
During a May 2008 interview with HipHopGame.com, Big Pooh hinted that he and Phonte may never record another album together:

That's so far in the future. We don't know if we are even gonna do another Little Brother album at this point. We are working on our personal projects right now.

In June 2009, Phonte announced the forthcoming Little Brother album, Leftback, but also announced that the group would subsequently take a Black Star-esque hiatus, wherein he and Big Pooh would continue to collaborate on projects, but that another group album would not be released for a long while.

Shortly before the April 2010 release of what would become Little Brother's final studio album, Leftback, Phonte and 9th Wonder exchanged pointed Twitter messages regarding Little Brother's release of a previously unreleased 9th Wonder produced single, "Star", on the Leftback album.

Shortly after the release of Leftback on April 10, 2010, Little Brother formally announced the group's breakup. Rapper Big Pooh noted:

I was just thinking about our own situation and then I realized, when groups leave, it's just like when a person dies. Every person dies and a baby is born. So, as Little Brother calls it quits, there are other groups to not necessarily take our place but to keep the tradition going ... That's what it's all about—you don't want your favorite group to force a relationship. Like, you don't want Tribe Called Quest ... If they don't really want to be together, you want them to make another album. If they make an album just because you asked for it, it's not going to be the same Tribe Called Quest you fell in love with. It's going to be something forced.

Phonte added:

If you're doing business with a friend, you gotta decide, well, do I end this business relationship and keep my friendship? Or do I continue this business relationship and end up wrecking both?

=== Reunion & May The Lord Watch ===
The reunion of Little Brother was, in part, due to the death of Phife Dawg in 2016. At this time Big Pooh and Phonte had not spoken in 5 years. Pooh sent Phonte a short message of love and appreciation. Phonte followed this text with a phone call where the two were said to have spoken for several hours. This and many followup conversations allowed the duo to rekindle their friendship.

Phonte, Big Pooh, and 9th Wonder reunited on stage together for the first time in eleven years at their hometown in the 2018 Art of Cool Festival. This reunion was the result of Royce da 5'9" being unable to attend the festival. According to Phonte, he was contacted by the promoters to substitute for Royce and called Pooh and 9th to collaborate with him. The group had not performed together in over a decade, so they performed many of their known hits including "Say it Again," "Loving It", "The Way You Do It," and "Dreams." Both artists felt that the energy from the show was a good omen, and after leaving the stage they knew they had something special. Following this performance, Phonte invited Pooh to a barbecue at his home where they decided to continue the collaboration.

In May 2019, it was revealed that Little Brother was to return and release new music later in the year, announcing their appearance at the upcoming Hopscotch Music Festival at September 7, 2019, in Raleigh, North Carolina. However, it was also revealed that 9th Wonder would not be returning as a third member of the group, with Phonte and Rapper Big Pooh continuing under the name; as they have been doing since 2007.

On August 19, 2019, it was announced that Little Brother will be releasing a new album, titled "May the Lord Watch", which was released the following day on the 20th. The album continues and updates the fictional UBN channel concept that was originally used for their well-known sophomore effort The Minstrel Show, and features no production from 9th Wonder; instead, working with producers such as Khrysis, Nottz, Focus and Black Milk. The album was completed in secret with many artists who featured on the album not knowing that they were contributing to a Little Brother album. The album was also remarkable for killing the singer Percy Miracles, who was an alter ego of Phonte. The first skit on the album features DJ Peter Rosenberg discussing the death of Percy. This concept was a tribute to the fact that the death of Phife Dawg was the event that brought the Phonte and Pooh back together. It was revealed in an interview on the Premium Pete Show that 9th Wonder was to have been a part of the reunion album, under its original title Homecoming. The title was changed due to Beyoncé releasing Homecoming: The Live Album to coincide with her concert film Homecoming. Phonte and Pooh decided to continue the project without 9th after several disagreements over production and touring commitments.

In April 2025, Little Brother announced their farewell tour, "Curtain Call: The Final Tour", which includes dates from May 24 to October 31, 2025.

== Discography ==
- The Listening (2003)
- The Minstrel Show (2005)
- Getback (2007)
- Leftback (2010)
- May the Lord Watch (2019)
