= Big Pooh =

American rapper

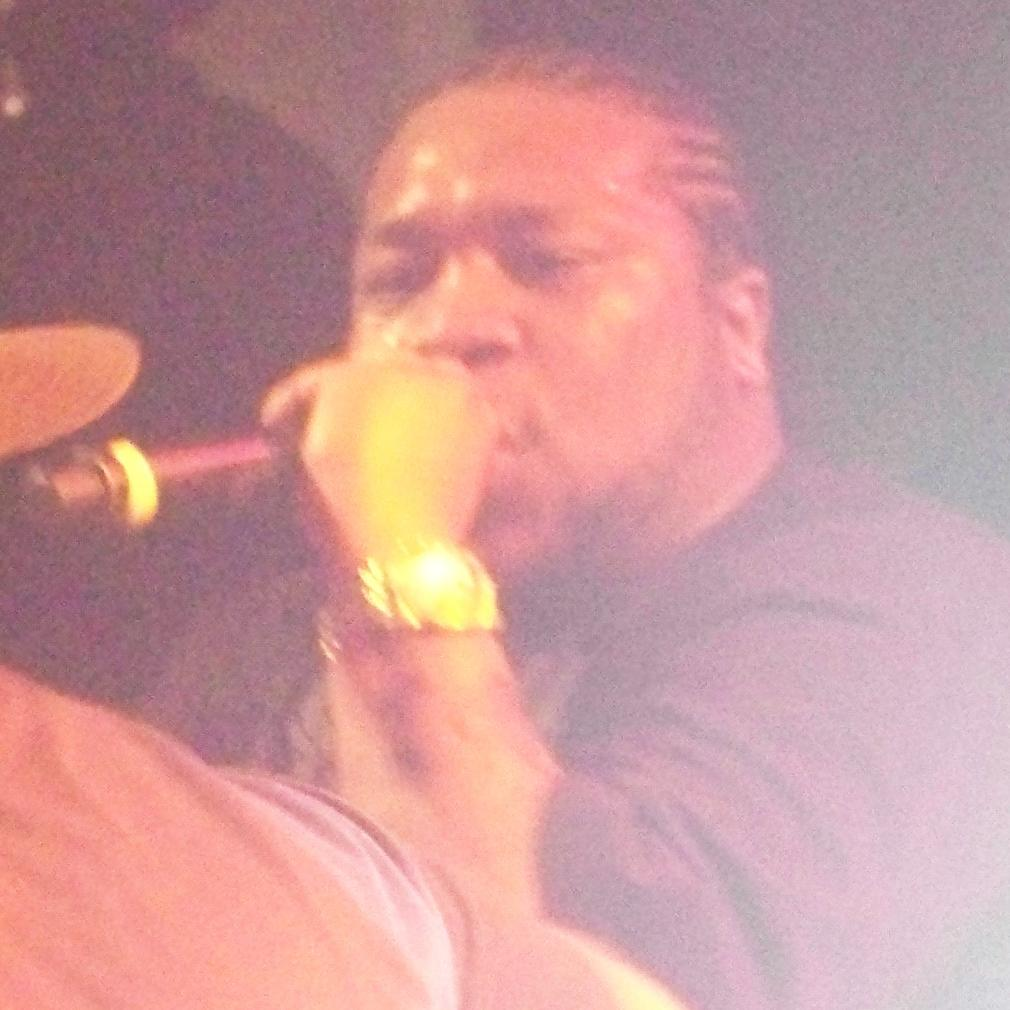
- Jones performing in Atlanta, Georgia in March 2008

Background information
- Also known as: Rapper Big Pooh
- Born: Thomas Louis Jones III; February 12, 1980 (age 46); Reston, Virginia, U.S.
- Origin: Raleigh-Durham, North Carolina, U.S.
- Genres: Hip-hop
- Occupation: Rapper
- Years active: 1998–present
- Labels: 6 Hole; Atlantic; For Members Only; Mello Music
- Member of: Little Brother
- Formerly of: Justus League

Thomas Louis Jones III (born February 12, 1980), better known by his stage name Big Pooh (or Rapper Big Pooh), is an American rapper, who, along with fellow rap artist Phonte, is a member of the acclaimed North Carolina hip-hop group Little Brother. In addition to numerous records and EP's by Little Brother, Pooh released a solo album in 2005 entitled Sleepers to positive critical reception. He has been guest featured on numerous tracks by other artists. Big Pooh also appreciates basketball and has served as a guest writer on a basketball blog.

== Biography ==
Big Pooh first got his break by Beni B of ABB Records. He had been pursued by most of the major labels for about a year. He ended up signing to Atlantic "because the independent label we were signed to, ABB felt Atlantic was the best route for them as well as us". His deal with Atlantic ended in 2007.

In January 2007, in response to the departure of Little Brother member, co-founder and main producer 9th Wonder, Pooh stated in an interview that "there are no hard feelings and no beef", adding that "this is just a decision that had to be made so all three of us could move forward and continue to provide the world with dope music."

Pooh appeared on the Little Brother download-only mixtape entitled And Justus for All, which was released free on the internet February 13, 2007, mixed by DJ Mick Boogie.

In 2009, he released a new interim "street" album, The Delightful Bars, with four slightly different versions of the album available, including one iTunes exclusive "Candy Apple" edition which contains 13 tracks, each featuring different artwork showing a nude model sprinkled with candy. The video for the album's lead single, "The Comeback," features a kitchen scene with Pooh surrounded by women preparing ingredients, baking and packaging "Delightful Bars" candy bars.

In January 2014, Pooh signed a two-album deal with independent label Mello Music Group- the record label that's also home to Oddisee and Kenn Starr. The first release will be an album produced entirely by Virginia producer Nottz, while the second project will be an EP produced by the label's production roster.

Pooh graduated from South Lakes High School in Reston, Virginia in 1998.

== Discography ==
=== Albums ===
- Sleepers (2005)
- The Delightful Bars (2009)
- Fat Boy Fresh Vol. 1: For Members Only (2011)
- Dirty Pretty Things (2011)
- Fat Boy Fresh Vol. 2: Est. 1980 (2012)
- Fat Boy Fresh Vol. 3: Happy Birthday, Thomas (2013)
- Fat Boy Fresh Vol. 3.5 (2013)
- Trouble In the Neighborhood (2014) with Roc C
- Words Paint Pictures (2015) with Apollo Brown
- Home Sweet Home (2015) with Nottz
- Everything 4 Sale (2016)
- RPM (2018)
- To Dream In Color (2022)

=== Mixtapes ===
- Rapper's Delight (2008)
- The Purple Tape (2010)
