= 9th Wonder =

American record producer (born 1975)

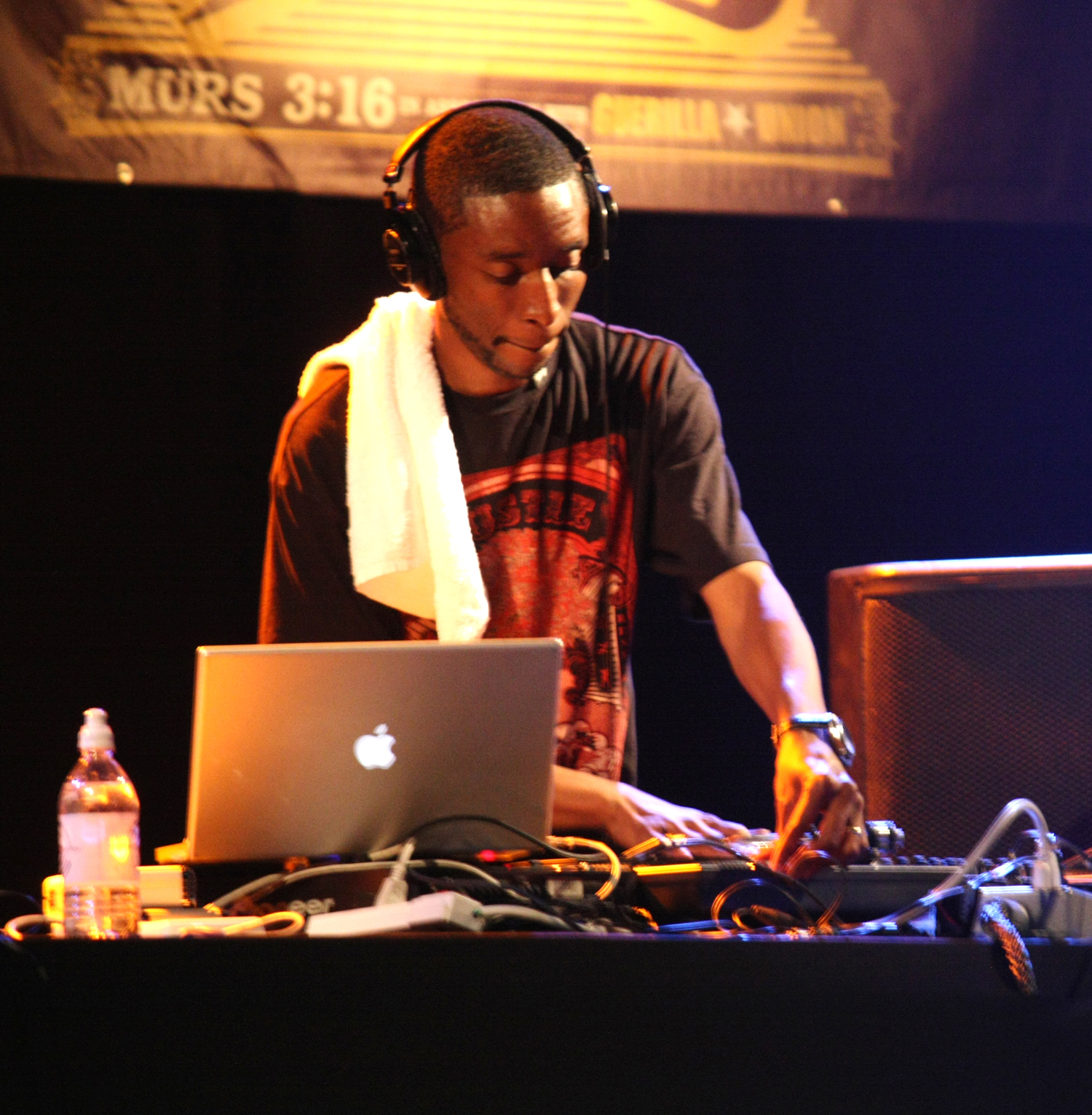
- 9th Wonder in 2008

Background information
- Also known as: 9thmatic
- Born: Patrick Denard Douthit; January 15, 1975 (age 51); Winston-Salem, North Carolina, U.S.
- Genre: Hip-hop
- Occupations: DJ; record producer; record executive; rapper
- Instruments: Akai MPC 2500; Turntables; Pro Tools; FL Studio; Maschine
- Years active: 1991–present
- Labels: It's a Wonderful World; Duck Down
- Member of: Dinner Party
- Formerly of: Little Brother; Justus League

Patrick Denard Douthit (born January 15, 1975), better known as 9th Wonder, is an American record producer, record executive, educator, and DJ who is the CEO of Jamla Records, distributed and marketed by Roc Nation, and Empire Distribution. As of Fall 2022, Douthit is Professor of the Practice in Residence in the Program in African American Studies at Wake Forest University. He also continues to teach courses at Duke University alongside his longtime collaborator, Professor Mark Anthony Neal.

Douthit was awarded a Nasir Jones Hip Hop Fellowship (2012–2013) at Harvard University's Hutchins Center for African and African-American Studies for his project "These Are the Breaks."

He began his career as the main producer for the group Little Brother in Durham, North Carolina, and has also worked with Jay-Z, Destiny's Child, Jean Grae, Wale, Murs, Buckshot, Erykah Badu, David Banner, Rapsody, Talib Kweli, 2 Chainz, Common, Kendrick Lamar, DJ Khaled, Ludacris, Terrace Martin, Robert Glasper, Kamasi Washington, Jill Scott, Mary J Blige, Ab-Soul, Anderson .Paak, Mac Miller, Nipsey Hussle, Vince Staples and Drake. As of 2010, 9th Wonder raps under the name of 9thmatic. 9th Wonder's production often builds on samples from artists such as Al Green and Curtis Mayfield.

In 2014, 9th Wonder was selected to join the executive board for Hip-Hop at the National Museum of African American History and Culture at the Smithsonian Institution. He currently serves as the NAACP’s National Ambassador for Hip Hop Relations and Popular Culture.

== Early Life and childhood ==
Douthit is a native of Winston-Salem, North Carolina and the youngest of four children, three sons and one daughter, born to Elmore and Patricia Douthit. In 2024, his father passed at the age of 82. His elder brother passed in 1960 from complications due to SIDS and his brother Charles died in 2020 at the age of 56. He has spoken publicly about the death of his older sister, Evelyn, for whom he named his recording studio, Brightlady Studios. In an interview surrounding the 2011 documentary, The Wonder Year, he stated that she died when he was approximately two years old, and that naming the studio after her was a way of honoring her memory.

Douthit's exposure to hip-hop began in the early 1980s. During his school years, he participated in the school band and learned the basics of several instruments. He graduated from Robert B. Glenn High School in Kernersville, North Carolina, in 1993.

After high school, Douthit enrolled at North Carolina Central University (NCCU) in Durham, North Carolina, and also attended North Carolina State University before returning to NCCU. In August 1998, while moving into Chidley Hall on the NCCU campus, he met rapper Phonte Coleman after Coleman asked to borrow a copy of The Source magazine. Coleman subsequently introduced him to Thomas Jones, known as Rapper Big Pooh.

In May 2026, Douthit returned to NCCU to complete his degree, graduating over two decades after initially leaving to pursue music full-time.

== Music career ==
In 2000, Douthit was introduced to FL Studio, then known as Fruity Loops, by producer Khrysis, which became his primary production tool and marked a turning point in his development as a producer.

9th Wonder began his career as the main producer for the group Little Brother. Little Brother's first recording, "Speed," was made in August 2001. In his own account, Douthit has described the song's origin as involving Phonte and Rapper Big Pooh, with the latter filling in after another Justus League member could not be reached. The trio released their critically acclaimed debut album, The Listening, in 2003, which led to the group signing to Atlantic Records in 2004.

9th Wonder's first significant career breakthrough came in 2003 when, as an up-and-coming producer, he released an unofficial remix album of Nas' 2002 album God's Son entitled God's Stepson. Released through internet outlets, the album garnered significant attention and acclaim. The producer has said that he was not thinking in terms of using it to generate a buzz or promote his skills at that point: "I never thought any of this of me as a producer was going to happen." The album has since been credited as starting the now regular trend for unofficial 'home-made' remixes of whole albums.

As part of Little Brother he gained recognition and critical acclaim for his production on their debut 2003 release,The Listening.

=== Jay-Z and The Black Album ===
In February 2003, Douthit met filmmaker Theron Smith through a mutual friend. In September 2003, Smith, who was working on the Jay-Z documentary Fade to Black, contacted Douthit and put him on the phone with Jay-Z's engineer Gimel "Young Guru" Keaton, who invited Douthit to New York. Douthit traveled to Baseline Studios, where he played beats for Jay-Z. After hearing one of Douthit's beat CDs, Jay-Z asked him to remain in the city until the following Monday. Rather than selecting an existing beat, Jay-Z gave Douthit a sample to work with and left the studio. Douthit crafted the beat for "Threat" on his IBM ThinkPad using FL Studio in approximately 25 minutes.

During the recording of the track, Jay-Z said the name "9th Wonder" in the song's introduction, announcing Douthit's production credit. "Threat" appeared on Jay-Z's The Black Album, released on November 14, 2003. The album featured a different producer for each track, with Douthit alongside Just Blaze, Kanye West, The Neptunes, Eminem, Timbaland, Rick Rubin, and others.

Douthit has stated that creating the "Threat" beat in 25 minutes on FL Studio represented a pivotal moment in hip-hop production.

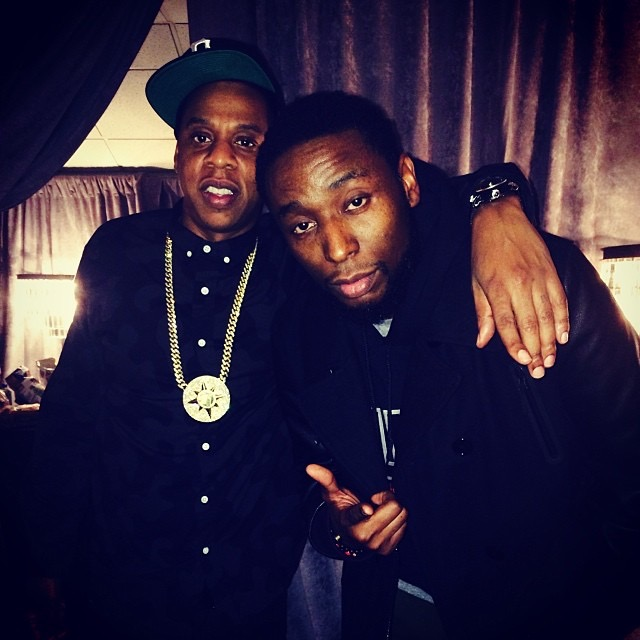
9th Wonder and Jay-Z, 2003.

=== Destiny's Child ===
Following the Black Album sessions, Jay-Z contacted Douthit about providing beats for Destiny's Child. In a 2021 interview, Douthit described receiving a phone call from a private number while he was on the phone with a friend. It was Jay-Z who asked him to come out to LA to work with Destiny's Child.

Douthit produced three tracks for the group's fifth and final studio album, Destiny Fulfilled (2004): "Is She the Reason," "Game Over," and the third single "Girl." The songs were co-written by songwriter Sean Garrett.

=== Departure from Little Brother ===
In January 2007, 9th Wonder announced that he had left the group. The separations were described as amicable. Rapper Big Pooh stated: "Little Brother has decided, in the best interest of the group, for Little Brother and 9th Wonder to part ways. There are no hard feelings and no beef." /

=== Drake ===
In 2007, Drake recorded "Think Good Thoughts" over a 9th Wonder-produced beat, featuring Phonte of Little Brother. The track appeared on Drake's second mixtape, Comeback Season, released September 1, 2007.

In August 2010, Drake exchanged tweets with 9th Wonder on Twitter, expressing his desire to work with him again (the first time being the production of "Think Good Thoughts" featuring Phonte and Elzhi for his 2007 mixtape Comeback Season). It was revealed in October 2010 that 9th Wonder would be producing for Drake on his second album, Take Care, which was released on November 15, 2011. However, a month prior to the release, 9th Wonder said in an interview that he would not appear on Take Care due to A&R issues.

=== Subsequent production work ===
Douthit went on to produce albums and songs for a wide range of artists including Murs, Jean Grae, Buckshot, David Banner, Mary J. Blige, Erykah Badu, De La Soul, and Ludacris.

Singer Chris Brown recorded a series of rap freestyles over 9th Wonder beats. The first was released on July 18, 2011, on YouTube under the title "Real Hip Hop #3". This was followed a day later by "Real Hip Hop #4" featuring Kevin McCall. These tracks were included in Brown's rap mixtape Boy in Detention, released on August 5, 2011.

=== Other projects ===
On June 25, 2020, 9th Wonder, Terrace Martin, Kamasi Washington, and Robert Glasper announced the formation of a supergroup, Dinner Party. They released a single, "Freeze Tag". Their debut album was released on July 10, 2020.

== Academia ==
2007 saw a sideline move into music academia for 9th Wonder when he, along with Christopher "Play" Martin from hip-hop group Kid-n-Play, was appointed Artist-In-Residence by the Chancellor of North Carolina Central University, and began instructing a Hip Hop history class in NCCU's Music Dept.

In January 2010, 9th Wonder began teaching a course titled "Sampling Soul" with Dr. Mark Anthony Neal at Duke University. In an interview with HitQuarters, he explained the reason for the move into academia: "Educating the youth on where hip-hop comes from and the history of it, using the records we use, gives hip-hop a longer life. I decided to become an advocate of that." At Duke, 9th Wonder also taught courses including Intro to Hip Hop Production, Black Popular Culture, and History of Hip-Hop (with Neal).

In 2012, Douthit was named a Hip-Hop Archive Fellow at Harvard University's Hutchins Center for African and African American Research, under the direction of the late Dr. Marcyliena Morgan and Dr. Henry Louis Gates Jr. During his 2012–2013 fellowship, he taught a course titled "The Standards of Hip-Hop" and conducted research for a project called "These Are the Breaks," curating a collection of 200 seminal hip-hop albums for the Eda Kuhn Loeb Music Library. His tenure was chronicled in the 2014 documentary The Hip-Hop Fellow, directed by Kenneth Price.

In 2016, Douthit served as Artist-in-Residence at the University of Pennsylvania, where he taught Hip Hop History.

In May 2021, Douthit joined the faculty of the Roc Nation School of Music, Sports and Entertainment at Long Island University as a visiting professor and artist-in-residence. His courses include the History of Hip Hop and The Making of an Album.

Douthit also held a teaching position at Elizabeth City State University from 2022 to 2024.

On May 9, 2026, Douthit received his Bachelor of Arts degree in Interdisciplinary Studies from North Carolina Central University, more than two decades after initially leaving school to pursue music. He and his daughter Jada graduated the same month, she from Winston-Salem State University as a member of Delta Sigma Theta.

Douthit currently teaches at Wake Forest University and Duke University.

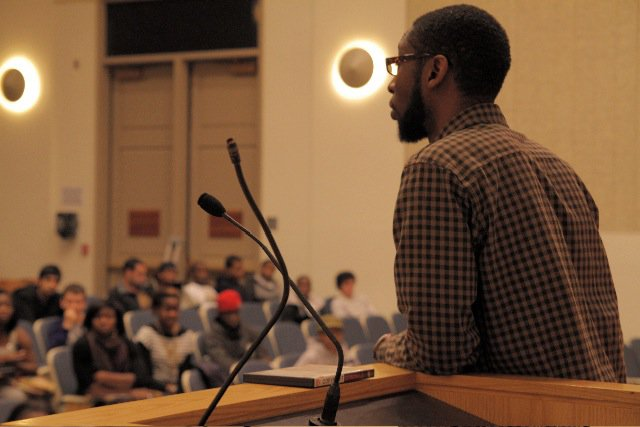
9th Wonder lectures at Duke University, 2025.

=== Other ventures and honors ===
In October 2019, Douthit was inducted into the North Carolina Music Hall of Fame at a ceremony in Kannapolis, North Carolina, alongside Mitch Easter, Big Daddy Kane, Elizabeth Cotten, and Merle Watson.

In July 2023, a mural of Douthit by artist Scott Nurkin was unveiled in downtown Winston-Salem at the corner of 6th Street and Liberty Street. Nurkin created the grayscale portrait as part of his North Carolina Musician Murals Project, which honors notable musicians in their hometowns.

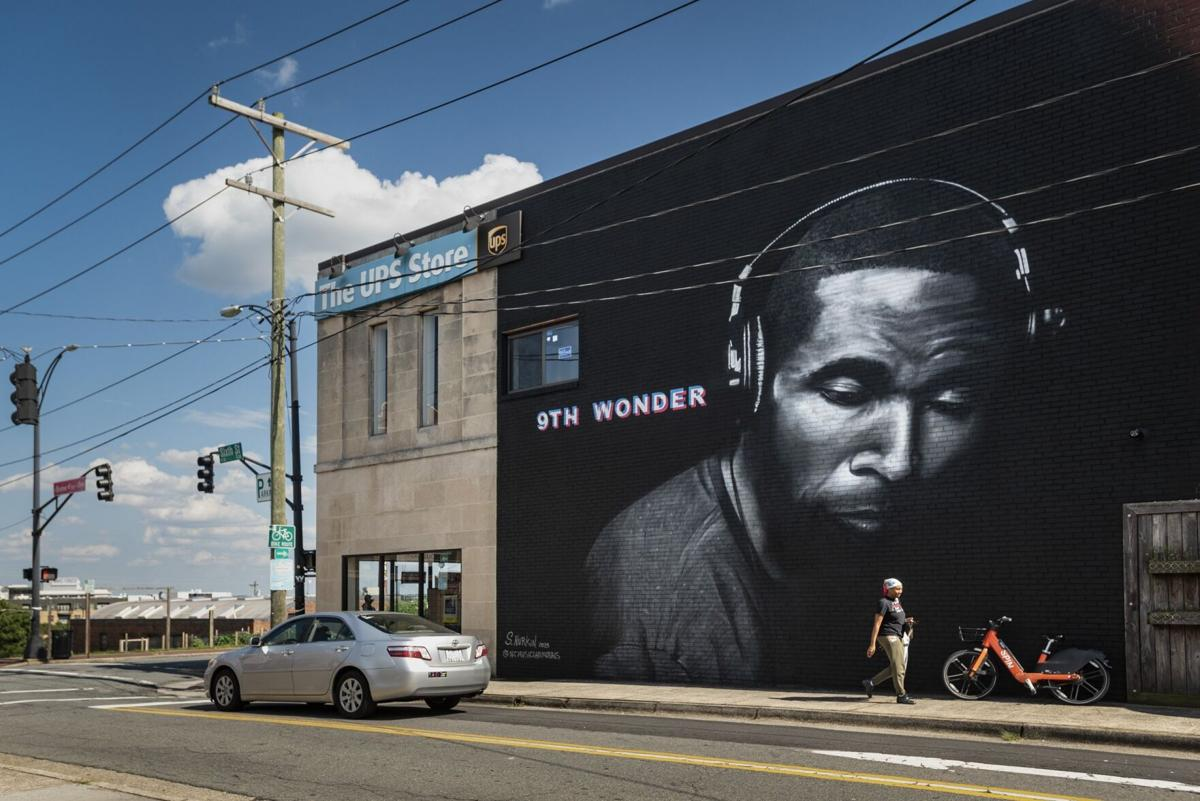
Scott Nurkin's mural of 9th Wonder in Downtown Winston-Salem, NC, July 2023.

== Discography ==
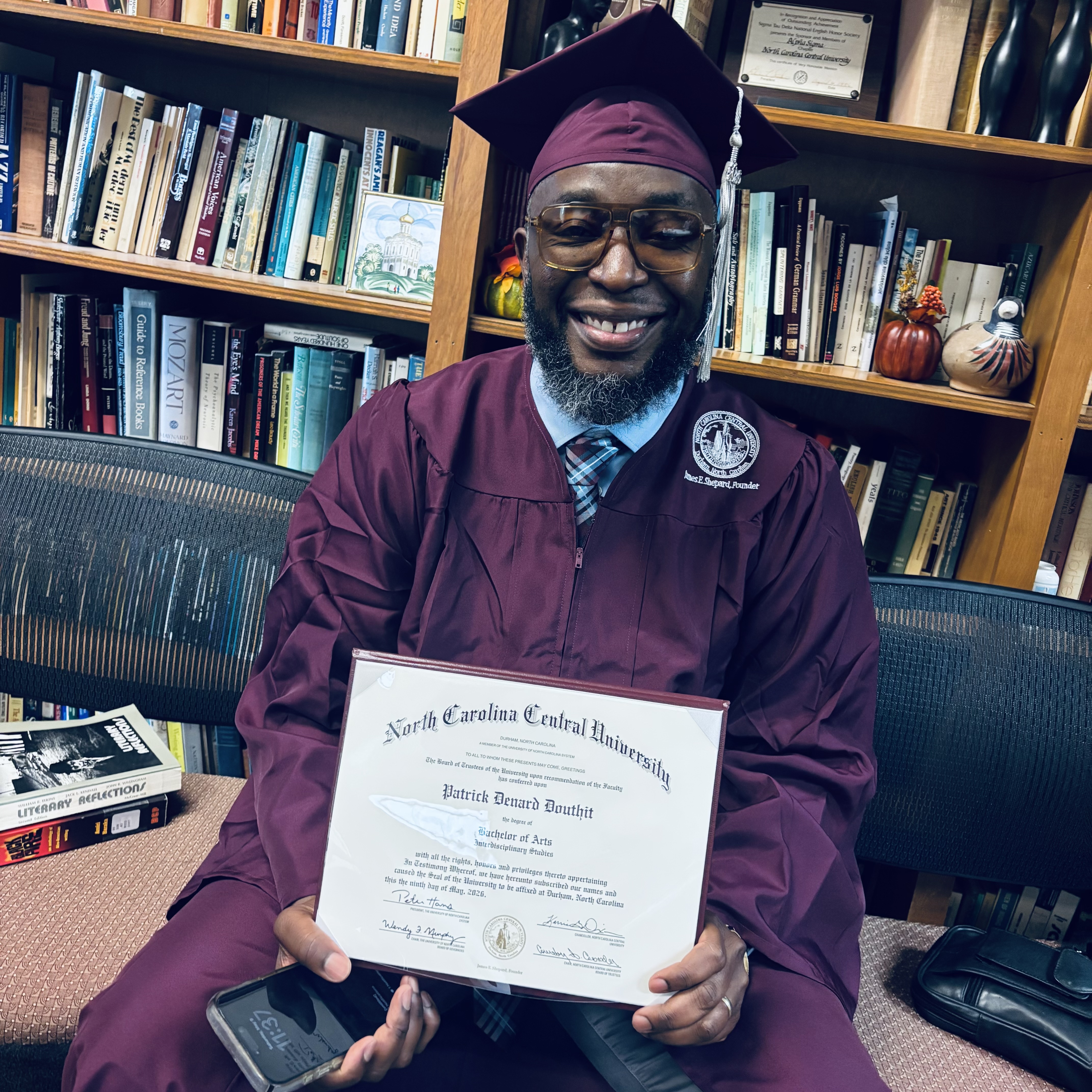
9th Wonder receives his diploma from North Carolina Central University, May 2026.

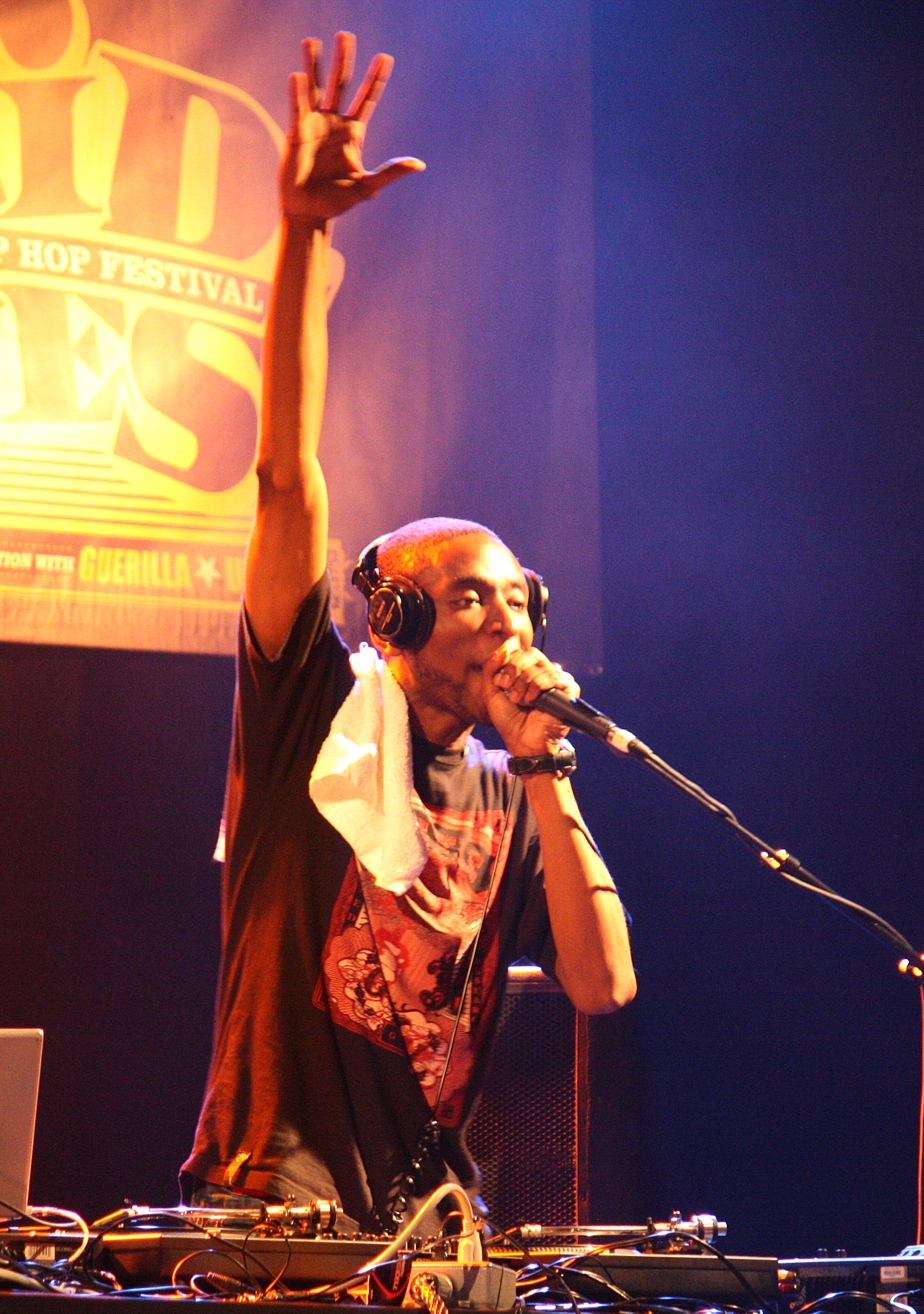
9th Wonder performing in 2008

=== Solo albums ===
- 2005: Dream Merchant Vol. 1
- 2007: Dream Merchant Vol. 2
- 2011: The Wonder Years
- 2012: Tutankhamen (Valley of the Kings)
- 2013: Bladey Mae (Grandma's Blades)
- 2016: Zion
- 2017: Zion II
- 2018: Zion III
- 2019: Zion IV
- 2020: Zion V: The Ballad of Charles Douthit
- 2021: Zion VI: Shooting In The Gym
- 2022: Zion VII
- 2023: Zion VIII
- 2023: Zion IX
- 2024: Zion X
- 2025: Zion XI

=== Group albums ===
- 2003: The Listening (with Phonte and Big Pooh as Little Brother)
- 2005: The Minstrel Show (with Phonte and Rapper Big Pooh as Little Brother)
- 2020: Dinner Party (with Terrace Martin, Robert Glasper and Kamasi Washington as Dinner Party)
- 2020: Dinner Party: Dessert (with Terrace Martin, Robert Glasper and Kamasi Washington as Dinner Party)
- 2023: Enigmatic Society (with Terrace Martin, Robert Glasper and Kamasi Washington as Dinner Party)
- 2026: Whatchu Bringing? (with Terrace Martin, Robert Glasper and Kamasi Washington as Dinner Party)

=== Collaborative albums ===
- 2003: Shake N Beats (Instrumental LP) (with Spectac)
- 2003: Legsclusives (with L.E.G.A.C.Y.)
- 2004: Murs 3:16: The 9th Edition (with Murs)
- 2005: Chemistry (with Buckshot)
- 2005: Spirit of '94: Version 9.0 (with Kaze)
- 2005: 9th Gate (with Access Immortal)
- 2006: Murray's Revenge (with Murs)
- 2006: Cloud 9: The 3 Day High (with Skyzoo)
- 2007: Class is in Session (with Pete Rock)
- 2008: The Formula (with Buckshot)
- 2008: Jeanius (with Jean Grae)
- 2008: Sweet Lord (with Murs)
- 2008: The Corner of Spec & 9th (with Spectac)
- 2010: Fornever (with Murs)
- 2010: Death of a Pop Star (with David Banner)
- 2012: The Solution (with Buckshot)
- 2012: The Final Adventure (with Murs)
- 2013: Where Do I Come From? (with Explicit)
- 2015: Indie 500 (with Talib Kweli)
- 2015: Brighter Daze (with Murs)
- 2017: The Lost Tapes (with Mr. Cheeks)
- 2019: The Iliad is Dead and The Odyssey is Over (with Murs)
- 2022: The Don & Eye (with The Musalini)
- 2023: The Don & Eye 2 (with The Musalini)
- 2024: The Supergoat (with Hus Kingpin)
- 2024: One Forty Seven (with Give Em Soul)
- 2025: Welcome Home (with Reuben Vincent)

=== Collaborative mixtapes ===
- 2006: Battle of the Beats Round 1–2 (with The Alchemist & DJ E.Nyce)
- 2007: 9th Year Freshman (with CHOPS)
- 2007: The Graduate (with Kanye West, Mick Boogie & Terry Urban)
- 2008: The W.ide W.Orld of W.Rap (with E.Ness)
- 2008: Album Mixtape Volume One (with Cans)
- 2008: 9 Wonders (NYOIL verses 9th Wonder) (with NYOIL)
- 2009: The R&B Sensation Mixtape (with Tyler Woods)
- 2009: Back to the Feature (with Wale & LRG)
- 2009: The Hardy Boy Mystery Mixtape: Curse of Thee Green Faceded (with Thee Tom Hardy & Don Cannon)
- 2010: To Hanes Mall (with Akello Light)
- 2010: Album Mixtape Part 2 (with Cans)
- 2010: The (Free) EP (with Actual Proof)
- 2011: TP is My Hero (with TP)
- 2012: Hanes Mall 2: Silas Creek Parkway EP (with Akello Light)
- 2025: Hit Me When You Get Here (with Reuben Vincent)

=== Compilation and remix albums ===
- 2003: 9th Invented the Remix
- 2003: God's Stepson – Nas (Remix of Nas's God's Son)
- 2004: Black Is Back! – Jay-Z (Remix of Jay-Z's The Black Album)
- 2005: The Remix EP (Remixed Songs of Smif-N-Wessun)
- 2009: Wonder Years – 9th Wonder Golden Years Remix LP
- 2010: 9th's Opus: It's a Wonderful World Music Group Vol.1
- 2010: 9th Invented the Remix...Again
- 2010: Loose Joints
- 2010: Food for Thought
- 2012: Tutankhamen
- 2013: Black American Gangster – Jay-Z (Remix of Jay-Z's American Gangster)
- 2014: 9th Wonder Presents: Jamla Is the Squad
- 2018: 9th Wonder Presents: Jamla Is the Squad II
