= Khrysis production discography =

The following is a list of productions by American Hip hop producer, Khrysis. The record labels are in parentheses next to the album titles.

== 2003 ==
=== Cesar Comanche – Paper Gods (D.O.T.F.W. Music) ===
- 10. "Daily Operation" (featuring L.E.G.A.C.Y. and Sean Boog) [co-produced with 9th Wonder]
- 11. "Wrong Religion"

=== Justus League – N.C. State Of Mind (Hall of Justus) ===
Disc 1:

- 04. Cesar Comanche – "Wrong Religion"
- 07. The Away Team – "The Blah Blah"
- 15. The Away Team – "On" (Featuring Cesar Comanche)

Disc 2:

- 02. The Away Team – "Let Off A Round"
- 04. Little Brother – "Love Is"
- 08. The Away Team – "On The Line" (Featuring Rapper Big Pooh, Chaudon, & Joe Scudda)

== 2004 ==
=== Masta Ace – A Long Hot Summer (M3 Macmil Music) ===
- 05. "Da Grind" (featuring Apocalypse) [scratches by DJ JS-One]

=== Little Brother – The Chittlin' Circuit – The Mixtape (Roy Lee's Records & Tapes) ===
- 02. "Starvation" (featuring Chaundon)

=== VA – Definition. The Hip-Hop Compilation (Neblina Records) ===
- 10. EAF – "Streetwise Remix"

== 2005 ==
=== Rapper Big Pooh – Sleepers (6 Hole Records, Inc) ===
- 02. "I Don't Care " (scratches by DJ Flash)
- 03. "Strongest Man"
- 06. "Just Friends"
- 07. "Live Life" (featuring O-Dash and Spectac)
- 08. "My Mind" (Featuring O-Dash and Darien Brockington)
- 14. "The Fever"

=== The Away Team – National Anthem (6 Hole Records, Inc) ===
- 01. "And Now Folks..."
- 02. "The Competition"
- 03. "Likka Hi"
- 04. "The Shining"
- 05. "Come On Down" (featuring Smif-N-Wessun)
- 06. "The Blah Blah"
- 07. "So I Tells The Bitch Right..."
- 08. "Fuck You"
- 09. "Let Off A Round"
- 10. "Me And My Fellows..."
- 11. "Make It Hot" (Featuring Joe Scudda, & Phonte)
- 12. "The End Of The Day"
- 13. "Upnatem"
- 14. "One-N-Only" (Featuring Percy Miracles)
- 15. "Always Be Around"
- 16. "On The Line" (featuring Joe Scudda, Rapper Big Pooh and Chaundon)
- 17. "Caution"
- 18. "Lights Out"

=== Little Brother – The Chittlin Circuit 1.5 (Fastlife) ===
- 02. "Third Party" (featuring Joe Scudda)
- 12. "Starvation" (featuring Chaundon)
- 17. "Khrysis Shoutro"

=== Little Brother – The Minstrel Show (Atlantic) ===
- 13. "Watch Me" (scratches by DJ Jazzy Jeff)

=== Sean Price – Monkey Barz (Duck Down) ===
- 03. "Onion Head" (featuring Tek)
- 11. "Bye Bye" (featuring Buckshot)

=== L.E.G.A.C.Y. – Project Mayhem (6 Hole Records, Inc) ===
- 02. "Mayhem"
- 03. "Too Long"
- 05. "Pure" (featuring Phonte)
- 07. "Throw Something"
- 15. "I'm A Star" (Featuring Chaundon, Joe Scudda & Median)

=== VA – NBA 2K6: The Tracks (Decon) ===
- 11. Jean Grae – "The Jam"

=== Kaze & 9th Wonder – Spirit Of '94: Version 9.0 (Brick Records) ===
- 02. "Locked in Chains"

=== Cesar Comanche – Squirrel and The Aces (ABB) ===
- 03. "The Grind" (featuring Supastition)
- 09. "Big Game Hunters" (featuring Joe Scudda and Tajai)
- 14. "Rockin It" (featuring Sean Boog)
- 16. "All Praises Due"

=== Edgar Allen Floe – True Links (MCEO Records) ===
- 04. "Back In Time"

=== The Thyrday – The Perfection Experiment 2 (Street Flava Entertainment) ===
- 01. "PX2 Intro"
- 07. "Rutherford Affair"
- 08. "Fan"
- 10. "Cycle"

=== Smif-n-Wessun – Reloaded (Duck Down) ===
- 04. "Gunn Rap"
- 06. "Sick Em Son"

=== Median – The Path to Relief (not on label) ===
- 01. "Cool" (featuring Phonte)
- 08. "Freestyle Outro"

=== K-Hill – Stamps of Approval (Kick-A-Verse Recordings) ===
- 05. "Walk In My Shoes (Remix)" (Featuring L.E.G.A.C.Y. and Sean Boog)
- 08. "Heavenly Father"

=== VA – Undercover Cuts 24 (Undercover Mag) ===
- 06. The Away Team – "The Shinin'"

=== Splash – The Ripple Effect (Amp Truth Records) ===
- 12. "Right On Time"

=== Justus League – Triple Play: The EP (6 Hole Records, Inc) ===
- 02. Rapper Big Pooh – "Tellin' Me"
- 03. Rapper Big Pooh – "Keep The Bling"
- 05. The Away Team – "Shitty"
- 06. The Away Team – "Do It" (featuring Joe Scudda & L.E.G.A.C.Y.)
- 07. The Away Team – "Come On Down" (featuring Smif-n-Wessun)
- 08. The Away Team – "Family Ties"
- 11. L.E.G.A.C.Y. – "The Death List" (featuring The Away Team)
- 13. The Away Team – "Who's That" (featuring L.E.G.A.C.Y. & Phonte)

== 2006 ==
=== Kenn Starr – The Starr Report (Halftooth Records) ===
- 26. "The Same, Pt. 1"

=== Kenn Starr – Starr Status (Halftooth Records) ===
- 10. "Waitin' On You"

=== Edgar Allen Floe – Floe Almighty (Shaman Work) ===
- 03. "Craftmatic "

=== Darien Brockington – Somebody To Love (Hall Of Justus, ABB Soul) ===
- 02. "Think It Over" (co-produced with 9th Wonder)
- 04. "Don't Say Goodbye" (co-produced with Sheldon "Official" Williams)
- 13. "Thank You" (keyboards by Sheldon "Official" Williams)

=== Little Brother & DJ Drama – Separate But Equal (Heat Entertainment) ===
- 08. "Rollin Out" (featuring Supastition)
- 09. "Macaroni"
- 12. "Hate"
- 15. "Boondock Saints" (featuring L.E.G.A.C.Y. & Chaundon)

=== VA – Hall of Justus Presents: Soldiers Of Fortune (ABB) ===
- 04. The Away Team – "Grind Season"
- 09. L.E.G.A.C.Y. – "I Want To Know"
- 10. Rapper Big Pooh – "Keep It To The Side" (featuring Skyzoo)
- 12. Jozeemo – "Feelings"
- 13. Hall of Justus – "Where I'm From (HOJ Remix)" (featuring Buddy Klein, E. Jones, Jozeemo, Phocuz, Skyzoo & Vandalyzm)
- 17. Hall of Justus – "Tour Of Duty" (featuring Purple St. James)
- 18. The Embassy & Big Dho – "Seeing Is Believing"
- 19. The Away Team & Chaundon – "Do It Again"

== 2007 ==
=== Sean Price – Jesus Price Supastar (Duck Down) ===
- 05. "Stop"
- 10. "King Kong" (Featuring Rock)
- 13. "Directors Cut"

=== Mick Boogie & Little Brother – And Justus For All (Mixtape) (Hall Of Justus) ===
- 09. Phonte – "A Word From Our Sponsors" (Featuring Von Pea)
- 17. Little Brother – "The Pressure" (Featuring Cormega)
- 24. Little Brother – "Back At It (Khrysis Remix)"

=== Skyzoo – Corner Store Classic (Mixtape) ===
- 12. "Braggin Rights"

=== Sean Price – Master P (Duck Down) ===
- 04. "The Huckabuck"
- 13. "Jamaican"
- 18. "Psycho Ward (Music From Mic Tyson)"

=== Median – Relief In The Making (Mixtape) (Halftooth Records) ===
- 06. Median – "Rize"
- 15. Median – "Personified (Remix)"
- 18. L.E.G.A.C.Y. – "I'm A Star" (Featuring Chaundon, Joe Scudda, & Median)
- 21. Median – "Yeah Right"

=== Joe Scudda – The Authentic (Mixtape) (Hall Of Justus) ===
- 03. "Poppin'"
- 05. "So Much Drama" (Featuring L.E.G.A.C.Y.)
- 07. "Bad Habits" (Featuring L.E.G.A.C.Y., & Sean Boog)
- 12. "Too Real" (Featuring Big Pooh)
- 13. "Each Day"
- 14. "Let Me Know" (Featuring L.E.G.A.C.Y., Chaundon, & Sean Boog)
- 15. "Do It"
- 16. "What Up"
- 18. "Balougagoon Season"
- 26. "Wanted Man" (Featuring L.E.G.A.C.Y., & Median)
- 27. "Door To My Life"
- 30. "F@!K Outta Here"

=== Median – Median's Relief (Halftooth Records) ===
- 05. "Rize" (Featuring LaDehra)
- 14. "2 Side Coin (Remix)" (Featuring L.E.G.A.C.Y., & Spectac)
- 15. "Personified (Super-Charged Remix)"

=== Supastition – Guest Of Honor (Mixtape) (Reform School Music) ===
- 06. Little Brother – "Rollin' Out" (Featuring Supastition)
- 16. Little Brother – "Doin' Me" (Featuring Supastition)

=== Little Brother – Getback (ABB, Hall Of Justus) ===
- 06. "After The Party" (Featuring Carlitta Durand)
- 11. "Dreams" (Produced by Rashid Hadee, co-produced by Khrysis, & Phonte)

=== Cormega – Who Am I? (Legal Hustle Entertainment) ===
- 12. "The Rap Game" (Featuring Little Brother)

=== Supastition – Leave Of Absence (Reform School Music) ===
- 05. "Word Has It"

=== Jozeemo – Cry Now Laf Later (Defend Music Inc.) ===
- 05. "I'm That Nigga"
- 14. "Lose It" (Featuring Little Brother)
- 15. "Feelings"

=== The Away Team – Training Day (Hall Of Justus) ===
- 01. "Scream Out!"
- 02. "Look At Me" (Featuring Nervous Reck)
- 03. "Sum Of Me" (Featuring Darien Brockington, & Evidence)
- 04. "Awesome" (Featuring Billionz)
- 05. "The Odds"
- 06. "Steppin On Toes"
- 07. "Chitter Chatter" (Featuring Black Milk)
- 08. "Rock A Bye" (Featuring Nervous Reck, & Supastition)
- 09. "Greedy"
- 10. "Don't Wait"
- 11. "Psycho Ward" (Featuring Sean Price)
- 12. "I'm A Fool"

== 2008 ==
=== Torae – Daily Conversation (Internal Affairs) ===
- 03. "Somethin' To See"
- 10. "Save The Day" (Featuring Kel Spencer, & Sha Stimuli)
- 11. "The Nigguz Is Comin'" (Featuring Tash)

=== Tanya Morgan – Tanya Morgan Is A Rap Group (Okayplayer Records) ===
- 21. "Bout To Be Some"

=== VA – Juice CD Volume 80 (Juice Magazin) ===
- 04. Little Brother – "The Getaway"

=== Jean Grae – The Orchestral Files (Deluxe Edition) (Babygrande) ===
Disc 2:

- 04. "The Jam"

=== Jean Grae – Jeanius (Blacksmith Music) ===
- 08. "#8"
- 09. "American Pimp" (Featuring Median)

=== Torae – Allow Me To Reintroduce Myself (not on label) ===
- 01. "Heard It All Before" (Featuring Emilio Rojas)
- 06. "Crash"
- 09. "Told You That" (Featuring Chaundon)

=== Chaundon – Carnage (Hall Of Justus, Defend Music Inc.) ===
- 04. "HPNY"
- 05. "Angie"
- 09. "Told You That" (Featuring Torae)
- 10. "Can I Live"

=== Brooklyn Academy – Presents: Summer School (Gold Dust Media) ===
- 02. "Rollout" (Featuring Wordsworth)

=== Edgar Allen Floe – Floe Almighty: The Remixture (MCEO Records) ===
- 02. "Floe Free Style (ShadE Business Remix)"
- 03. "Craftmatic (Karate Kid Remix)"
- 14. "Off and On" (Bonus Track)
- 15. "On Schedule" (Bonus Track)

=== Rapper Big Pooh – Rapper's Delight (not on label) ===
- 02. "Reality Check" (Featuring Big Dho, D. Black, & Mykstro)
- 04. "Hands Up" (Featuring Chaundon, & Roc 'C')
- 09. "Crazy"
- 15. "On The Real" (Featuring E. Ness, & Jozeemo)

=== DJ K.O. – Picture This... (Shaman Work) ===
- 12b. Torae, John Robinson, Talib Kweli, Tiffany Paige – "Someday (Remix)"

=== Heltah Skeltah – D.I.R.T. (Da Incredible Rap Team) (Duck Down) ===
- 03. "The Art Of Disrespekinazation"
- 04. "D.I.R.T. (Another Boot Camp Clik Yeah Song)"

=== Vandalyzm – Megatron Majorz (Starving Artist Entertainment) ===
- 05. The Away Team – "Money On The Table (Remix)" (Featuring Vandalyzm)

=== YahZarah - The Prelude (Self-released) ===
- 01. "Four Alarm Fire"
- 02. "Real Good" (featuring Phonte)

=== Little Brother – Separate But Equal (Drama Free Edition) (Hall Of Justus) ===
- 07. "Rollin Out" (featuring Supastition)
- 08. "Macaroni"
- 09. "Boondock Saints" (featuring Chaundon & L.E.G.A.C.Y.)

=== Evidence – The Layover EP (Decon) ===
- 01. "The Layover"
- 02. "For Whom The Bell Tolls" (featuring Blu, Phonte, & will.i.am)

== 2009 ==
=== Finale – A Pipe Dream And A Promise (Interdependent Media) ===
- 04. "The Waiting Game" (Featuring Invincible)

=== Rapper Big Pooh – The Delightful Bars (The North American Pie Version) (Hall Of Justus) ===
- 02. "The Comeback"
- 09. "Reality Check" (Featuring Big Dho, D. Black, & Mykestro)
- 13. "The Life" (Featuring Muhsinah)

=== Rapper Big Pooh – The Delightful Bars (iTunes Exclusive) (Hall Of Justus) ===
- 03. "Power" (Featuring O. Dash)
- 04. "The Comeback"
- 06. "Hands Up" (Featuring Chaundon, & Roc C)
- 07. "On The Real" (Featuring Jozeemo, & E. Ness)
- 11. "The Life" (Featuring Muhsinah)

=== KRS-One & Buckshot – Survival Skills (Duck Down) ===
- 10. "Amazin" (Featuring Loudmouf Choir, & Sean Price)
- 11. "Hear No Evil"

== 2010 ==
=== Blacastan – The Master Of Reality (Brick Records) ===
- 11. "It's A Khrysis"
- 16. "If You Only Knew" (Featuring Big Stat)

=== Little Brother – LeftBack (Hall Of Justus) ===
- 01. "Curtain Call"
- 02. "Table For Twor" (Featuring Jozeemo, & Yahzarah)
- 03. "Tigallo For Dolo"
- 04. "Revenge" (Featuring Median, & Truck North)
- 07. "Go Off Go On"
- 11. "Get Enough Pt. 2" (Featuring Khrysis)
- 13. "24" (Featuring Torae)

=== Big Remo – 9th Wonder Presents Big Remo: Entrapment (It's a Wonderful World Music Group) ===
- 02. "What It Takes"
- 11. "Entrapment" (Featuring Khrysis)

=== Krondon – Let Em Live ===
- 12. "Incline" (Bonus Track)

=== Slum Village – Villa Manifesto (E1 Records) ===
- 01. "Bare Witness" (Featuring DJ Babu)

=== Copywrite – The Life and Times of Peter Nelson ===
- 06. "Best In Show" (Featuring Tage Future & Planet Asia)

=== 9th Wonder – 9th's Opus: It's a Wonderful World Music Group Vol. 1 (IWMMG/ABB) ===
- 02. 9thmatic, Big Remo & Khrysis – 1000ft.
- 12. The Away Team – Bitch Be Gone

=== Actual Proof – The (Fre)EP (IWWMG/The Academy) ===
- 16. Ya Don't Stop (Like This)"

=== Rapsody – Return of the B-Girl (IWWMG/Jamla) ===
- 08. "Return of the B-Girl (Mara Jade)"

=== Sean Boog – Lights Beers Ahead of You (IWWMG/Jamla) ===
- 06. "Drunken Style" (Featuring Add2theMC)
- 07. "Red Eye"
- 08. "Takin' It"
- 09. "Playground"
- 12. "What It Is" (Featuring Rapsody)
- 19. "It's Cold (Go Inside)" (Featuring Halo & E. Jones)

== 2011 ==
=== Actual Proof – The Talented Tenth (IWWMG/Jamla) ===
- 07. "Letta’ to Correta" (Featuring Bird & The Midnight Falcons)
- 09. "The March"
- 12. "Detroit Red"
- 16. "Let Cha Know" (Featuring Big Remo)
- 19. "Desegregation" (Featuring Thee Tom Hardy & Sean Boog)
- 20. "The X Factor"

=== Mac Miller – Best Day Ever (Rostrum Records) ===
- 12. "She Said"

=== Talib Kweli – Gutter Rainbows (Blacksmith/3D/Javotti Media) ===
- 06. "I'm On One"

=== HaLo – Heat Writer II (IWWMG/Jamla) ===
- 01. "Topic of Conversation"
- 02. "Mr. Ben Ready" (featuring Big Remo)
- 03. "Jammin’ on the One"
- 10. "Cold Chillin’"
- 11. "Follow Me" (featuring GQ)
- 15. "Nevermind"

=== King Mez & Khrysis – The King's Khrysis EP (IWWMG/BoardRoom Music) ===
- 01. "Reaching Out (Intro)"
- 02. "Nightmares"
- 03. "Shine"
- 04. "From The South" (featuring Thee Tom Hardy & Sean Boog)
- 05. "Something's Missing"
- 06. "The King's Khrysis" (featuring Phonte)

=== TP – TP Is My Hero (IWWMG/Jamla) ===
- 01. "Intro" (Featuring Tyler Woods)
- 02. "Gotta Work' (Featuring King Mez, Halo & Heather Victoria)

=== Big Remo - L-R-G Presents Robin Hood Ree (IWWMG/LRG/Jamla) ===
- 02. "One For The Fam" (featuring The Away Team)
- 03. "Molotov Ree"
- 15. "Spark Something" (featuring Tyler Woods & Laws)

=== Heather Victoria – Graffiti Diary (IWWMG/Jamla) ===
- 03. "Missing You" (featuring Big Remo)
- 05. "Your Lady" (featuring Laws)
- 06. "Won't Stress Me" (featuring Rapsody)

=== Sean Boog – The Phantom of the Jamla (IWWMG/Jamla) ===
- 01. "Back & Forth"

=== Elzhi – Elmatic (The Jae.B Group) ===
- 12. "Detroit State of Mind Pt. II" (featuring Sean Boog)

=== Rapsody – Thank H.E.R. Now (IWWMG/Jamla) ===
- 10. "Extra Extra" (featuring Halo & Mac Miller)
- 12. "Blankin' Out (Remix)" (featuring Jean Grae)

=== Khrysis – "The Hour of Khrysis" (IWWMG/Jamla) ===
- "Love Today" (featuring Laws)

=== Actual Proof – "Still Hotter Than July" (IWWMG/Jamla) ===
- 06. "2 High" (featuring Thee Tom Hardy)
- 10. "Rod Strickland"
- 16. "Light The World"
- 17. "Take It Back" (featuring Drique London)

=== HaLo – "The Blind Poet" (It's A Wonderful World Music Group/Jamla) ===
- 02. "Too Strong" (featuring Skyzoo)
- 03. "Bag" (featuring Charlie Smarts)
- 04. "Bussin" (featuring 9thmatic)
- 09. "Magical" (featuring Sean Boog & Thee Tom Hardy)
- 13. "Dark Knight"

=== Phonte – Charity Starts at Home (+FE Music) ===
- 03. "Everything is Falling Down" (Featuring Jeanne Jolly)

=== The Away Team – Scars & Stripes (IWWMG/Jamla/Duck Down) ===
- 01. "Intro"
- 02. "Bad News" (featuring King Mez & Blue Raspberry)
- 03. "Scars & Stripes"
- 04. "4 The People"
- 05. "Cheers" (featuring Heather Victoria)
- 06. "What Is This" (featuring Evidence)
- 07. "The Road To Redemption"
- 08. "Drift"
- 09. "Set It Off" (featuring Talib Kweli & Rapsody)
- 10. "Happenin’ Today"
- 11. "Hot Potato" (featuring Halo & Sundown)
- 12. "I Ain’t Mad" (featuring Jay Rush)
- 13. "Paid" (featuring Laws & Big Remo)
- 14. "Proceed" (featuring Enigma)
- 15. "Get Down" (featuring GQ)
- 16. "Picture This" (featuring Kelsy Lu)
- 17. "See U Later" (featuring Phonte)

=== Torae – For the Record (Internal Affairs) ===
- 02. "Alive" (featuring Wes)

=== Rapsody – For Everything (IWWMG/Jamla) ===
- 05. "For Everything"
- 07. "420 pm"
- 12. "Live It Up" (featuring Bluu Suede)
- 13. "Rock the Bells" (featuring Kendrick Lamar)

=== GQ – Troubled Man (IWWMG/Jamla) ===
- 05. ACC (featuring Rapsody & Halo)
- 07. Don't Be Afraid (featuring Halo)
- 12. Forever In a Day
- 13. Magnetc (featuring Halo)

=== Heather Victoria – Hip Hop Soul Lives (IWWMG/Jamla) ===
- 04. "Go All In"

== 2012 ==
=== Copywrite – God Save The King (Man Bites Dog) ===
- 07. "Union Rights" (featuring MHz)

=== Planet Asia – Black Belt Theatre (Gold Chain Music/Green Streets Entertainment) ===
- 01. "Lost And Found"

=== Rapsody – The Black Mamba EP (IWWMG/Jamla) ===
- 05. "Ballin' One" (featuring Tab-One)

=== Actual Proof – Black Boy Radio (IWWMG/Jamla) ===
- 02. "Live From Cloud 9"
- 06. "Skate Kids II" (featuring Scoopay)
- 09. "Fonk It Up (Reprise)"
- 15. "The Feel"
- 20. "A Letta to Coretta" (featuring Bird & the Midnight Falcons) [*]

=== Add-2 – S.ave O.ur S.ouls (Not On Label) ===
- 11. "Keep Walking" (featuring Sundown)

=== Khryis – fuNkwhatchuheard (IWWMG/Jamla) ===
- 01. "Turn It On"
- 02. "YEAH! YEEEAAAH!!!!"
- 03. "Rhode To Riches"
- 04. "BONG BONG!"
- 05. "Dark Alley Muzik"
- 06. "All That Bleepty Bleep"
- 07. "Change The World"
- 08. "All Black"
- 09. "NC!!!"
- 10. "Mountain Tops"
- 11. "(That's What) She Said"
- 12. "Rest In Shine/Love Today" (featuring Laws) [*]
- 13. "OKMD" (featuring Oh No) [*]

=== Big Remo – Sleepwalkers (IWWMG/Jamla) ===
- 03. "I’m Back" (featuring Rapsody)
- 06. "Still Life" (featuring HaLo & 9thmatic)
- 08. "You Know"

=== Sean Boog – Sean Boogie Nights (IWWMG/Jamla) ===
- 06. "Bug Spray"
- 11. "Money Isn't Everything"

=== Rapsody – The Idea of Beautiful (IWWMG/Jamla) ===
- 01. "Motivation" (featuring Big Rube)
- 08. "Destiny"

=== Torae – Off the Record (Internal Affairs) ===
- 04. "Gettin' Biz" (featuring Khrysis)

=== Sean Price – Mic Tyson (Duck Down) ===
- 08. "Hush"

== 2013 ==
=== GQ – Death Threats & Love Notes: The Prelude ===
- 12. "I Know" (featuring Rapsody and Rocki Evans)

=== Locksmith – The Green Box ===
- 15. "Transitions" (produced with Eric G)

=== Rapsody – She Got Game ===
- 03. "Thank You Very Much"
- 04. "Everlasting"
- 05. "Caught Up" (featuring Raheem DeVaughn)
- 07. "Special Way"
- 12. "Facts Only"
- 20. "The Pressure" (featuring Styles P)

=== Add-2 & Khrysis – Between Heaven & Hell ===
- 01. "The Birth"
- 02. "Don't Go"
- 03. "Club Church/Club Hell"
- 04. "The Death Of Chicago"
- 05. "The Ugly Side Of Beautiful" (featuring GQ)
- 06. "It's Ok" (featuring Rapsody)
- 07. "They Call It"
- 08. "Runnin'"
- 09. "The Glorious"

=== Talib Kweli – Gravitas ===
- 01. "Inner Monologue"

=== Truck North – Murder By Mourning ===
- 06. "Bitches Brew"

=== Khrysis – Merry Khrysmas ===
- 01. "Celebrate"
- 02. "Khrysmas Time Is Here"
- 03. "Simply"
- 04. "Lettin It Snow"
- 05. "What The Lonely Do"
- 06. "See You At The Crib"
- 07. "First Khrysmas"
- 08. "Sleigh Jam"
- 09. "The Homie Rudolph"
- 10. "Its Khrysmas Time"

== 2014 ==
=== Various Artists – 9th Wonder Presents: Jamla Is the Squad ===
- 01. Actual Proof & TP – "God Willin'"
- 04. Big Remo, Halo & Rapper Big Pooh – "Bang"
- 05. Talib Kweli, Elzhi & Phonte – "No Competition"
- 06. Halo, Masta Killa & Talib Kweli – "Pretty Bird"
- 07. GQ & Heather Victoria – "Walk On By"
- 09. Add-2 – "Bomber & a Fly Chick"
- 13. Pete Rock, Lecrae & Rapsody – "Be Inspired"
- 22. Add-2 & Sundown – "Knock Knock"

=== Verbal Kent – Sound of the Weapon ===
- 01. "Truth"
- 02. "Body the Beat" (featuring DJ Eclipse)
- 03. "Hunched Over Chessboards" (featuring DJ Eclipse)
- 04. "Now or Never, Pt. 1"
- 05. "Underrated?"
- 06. "Raponomics"
- 07. "Sound of the Weapon"
- 08. "No Excuse"
- 09. "Now or Never, Pt. 2"
- 10. "Sammy Sosa"
- 11. "Slap the Shit Out of You"
- 12. "Joe Shmoses"
- 13. "Now or Never, Pt. 3"

=== GQ – Rated Oakland ===
- 08. "Last Breath II"
- 10. "Nice Guy"

=== Skyzoo & Torae – Barrel Brothers ===
- 10. "The Hand Off"

=== Halo – Mansa Musa ===
- 04. "Galore"
- 05. "Secrets" (featuring Tab-One)
- 06. "Pretty Birds" (featuring Masta Killa & Talib Kweli)
- 09. "Merry Go" (featuring Masta Killa & Charlie Smarts)
- 11. "Stop It" (featuring Problem & Bad Lucc)
- 12. "Snow Goggles"
- 15. "Gorgeous Regular" (featuring Heather Victoria)
- 16. "Bonfire" (featuring Sundown)

=== Problem x LA Leakers – 354 Lift Off ===
- 12. "Hate" (featuring 12Til)

=== Rapsody – Beauty and the Beast ===
- 04. "Drama"
- 06. "The World"

=== Vstylez – At Oddz Til I'm Even ===
- 08. "LasWonzOut" (featuring Crystal Lucas)
- 14. "Live with Schiavone (Road Warriors)"

== 2015 ==
=== King Magnetic – Timing Is Everything ===
- 13. "Let's Get It On" (featuring Smif-N-Wessun, GQ Nothin Pretty & Reef the Lost Cauze)

=== Add-2 – Prey for the Poor ===
- 02. "Stop Play Rewind" (featuring Rapsody)
- 03. "BRB"
- 04. "Young Black Boy" (featuring Jamila Woods)
- 05. "Say Goodbye"
- 07. "Green Light Party"
- 09. "One Night" (featuring Raheem DeVaughn)
- 10. "On My Soul"
- 14. "We Gon Make It"

=== Mega Trife – Gold Ain't Found Above Ground ===
- 10. "The Groupies"
- 13. "Feelin U"

=== Talib Kweli & 9th Wonder - Indie 500 ===
- 04. "Lo-Fi" (featuring Niko Is)
- 12. "Technicolor Easels" (featuring Niko Is)
- 13. "Understand" (featuring Brother Ali & Planet Asia)

=== Pearl Gates – Diamond Mind ===
- 03. "Countdown" (featuring Wordsworth & Pav Bundy)

== 2016 ==
=== Torae – Entitled ===
- 14. "Shoutro"

=== Khrysis – MotherFuNker ===
- 01. "30 Minutes Or Less"
- 02. "The Staink"
- 03. "The GhatDam"
- 04. "Drunky Drumer"
- 05. "That Bounce"
- 06. "Breakin It Down"
- 07. "Jammed Out"
- 08. "SpookyToof"
- 09. "Back To The Blips"
- 10. "Don't Fall"
- 11. "How Ya Mama Feel"
- 12. "The Beginning"

=== Rapsody – Crown ===
- 06. "Take It Slow" (produced with 9th Wonder)
- 08. "2 AM" (featuring Ab-Soul) (produced with 9th Wonder)
- 09. "OooWee" (featuring Anderson .Paak)
- 10. "Fire" (featuring Moonchild) (produced with Ka$h & 9th Wonder)

=== GQ ===
- "Guns Hang High" (featuring Rapsody) (produced with 9th Wonder)

== 2017 ==
=== King Magnetic – Everything Happens 4 A Reason ===
- 06. "Alone" (featuring Masta Ace, Slug & DJ Eclipse)

=== Talib Kweli & Styles P – The Seven ===
- 06. "Let It Burn" (featuring Rapsody & Chris Rivers)

=== Rapsody – Laila's Wisdom ===
- 03. "Chrome (Like Ooh)" (produced with Ka$h)
- 04. "Pay Up" (produced with Ka$h)
- 07. "Nobody" (featuring Anderson .Paak, Black Thought & Moonchild) (produced with 9th Wonder)

== 2018 ==
=== Jericho Jackson - Elzhi & Khrysis are Jericho Jackson ===
- whole album

=== Kooley High - Never Come Down ===
- 06. "Shambles" (featuring Carlitta Durand)
- 09. "Cool Out / Tranquility" (co-produced with Kash)
- 11. "No Favors"

=== Black Thought – Streams of Thought, Vol. 1 ===
- 05. "Thank You" (featuring KIRBY)

=== Various Artists – 9th Wonder Presents: Jamla is the Squad II ===
- 01. Reuben Vincent, Ian Kelly, Heather Victoria, GQ & Rapsody - "Welcome to JamRoc"
- 03. Pharoahe Monch - "Crazy"
- 05. Jericho Jackson & Conway - "Machine & McQueen"
- 06. Don Flamingo - "Ya Heard Me"
- 12. Amber Navran - "Good to Me"
- 16. GQ - "P.A.N."
- 19. Rapsody - "REDBLUE" (featuring JID)
- 22. Niko Brim, Swank, Charlie Smarts, GQ & Rapsody - "Goodfellas"

=== Conway the Machine - EIF 2: Eat What U Kill ===
- 09. "Be Proud of Me"

=== Cam Be - 7 Steps to 7 ===
- 02. "iDust" (co-produced with Cam Be)

== 2019 ==
=== Smif-n-Wessun - The ALL ===
- 02. "Testify"
- 04. "Ocean Drive" (featuring Musiq Soulchild & Rapsody)
- 06. "Letter 4 U" (featuring Smitty)
- 09. "We Good" (featuring GQ & Heather Victoria)
- 10. "Stahfallah"
- 11. "Illusions"

=== Murs - The Iliad is Dead and the Odyssey is Over ===
- 04. "Unicorn Glitter"
- 11. "Tony Robbins Pocketbook"

=== Little Brother - May the Lord Watch ===
- 01. "The Feel"
- 03. "Everything"
- 09. "What I Came For" (co-produced with Phonte)

=== Rapsody - Eve ===
- 05. "Whoopi"

== 2020 ==
=== Conway the Machine - From King to a God ===
- 13. "Jesus Khrysis"

=== Busta Rhymes - Extinction Level Event 2: The Wrath of God ===
- 15. "Best I Can" (featuring Rapsody) (co-produced with 9th Wonder)

== 2021 ==
=== Evidence - Unlearning, Vol. 1 ===
- 08. "Talking to the Audience"

=== Cesar Comanche & Poe Mack - A Promise Not To Sting ===
- 11. "Algorithm"

=== DJ Kay Slay - The Soul Controller ===
- 06. "Respect the Architect" (featuring Busta Rhymes, Benny the Butcher, Conway the Machine & PRAYAH) (co-produced with DJ Kay Slay)

== 2022 ==
=== Phife Dawg - Forever ===
- 03. "Fallback" (featuring Rapsody and Renée Neufville)
- 07. "Wow Factor" (featuring Maseo)

=== The Musalini & Khrysis - Pure IZM ===
- whole album

=== JID - The Forever Story ===
- 13. "Money"

== 2023 ==
=== Reuben Vincent - Love & War ===
- 01. "Butterfly Doors"

=== The Musalini & Khrysis ===
- "Anything Goes"

=== Conway the Machine - Won't He Do It ===
- 01. "Quarters"

=== Termanology - The Summer Pack ===
- 02. "The Way I Feel"

=== Seattle's Key & Khrysis ===
- "Higher"

== 2024 ==
=== Swank & King Draft - Vice City ===
- 02. "Vice City"
- 13. "Vices" (featuring Shawn Stockman)

=== Silent Snipers & Khrysis - Perfect Time ===
- whole album

=== Wais P & Khrysis - Hocaine ===
- whole album

=== 60 East - My Hometown ===
- 02. "What's My Name"
- 04. "Out the Inland" (featuring Oktane, Trizz & Sly Boogy)
- 06. "Deals"
- 11. "In" (featuring DJ Rhettmatic)
- 13. "Lil Brother"

=== Bless Picasso - Rillest in the Room ===
- 02. "Last Night"

=== The Musalini - Active & Attractive ===
- 01. "A Million"

=== Redman - Muddy Waters Too ===
- 03. "Whut's Hot" (featuring Oran "Juice" Jones II)

== 2025 ==
=== 1999 WRITE THE FUTURE - Timeless ===
- 04. "Phabulous" (with The Pharcyde)

=== Jericho Jackson - I AM HIM ===
- Whole maxi-single

=== T.F - The Green Bottle ===
- Whole album

=== The Musalini & Khrysis - Pure IZM 2 ===
- Whole album

=== Heather Victoria - I CAN'T MAKE THIS UP ===
- 06. "Marry Me" (featuring Dope Sutton) [co-produced with The Kount]
- 08. "I Don't Need You" (featuring Meelah)
