= Survival Skills (album) =

Studio album by KRS-One & Buckshot
- Released: September 15, 2009
- Recorded: November 2008–March 2009
- Studios: DaMan Studios (New York, NY)
- Genre: Hip-hop
- Length: 56:58
- Label: Duck Down
- Producers: Buckshot (exec.); Drew "Dru-Ha" Friedman (exec.); 9th Wonder; Black Milk; Coptic; DJ Mentplus; Havoc; Illmind; Khrysis; Marco Polo; MoSS; Nottz

KRS-One chronology
Maximum Strength (2008)	Survival Skills (2009)	Meta-Historical (2010)

Buckshot chronology
The Formula (2008)	Survival Skills (2009)	The Solution (2012)

Singles from Survival Skills
- 1. "Robot" Released: May 5, 2009; 2. "Survival Skills" Released: November 24, 2009

Survival Skills is a collaborative studio album by American rappers KRS-One and Buckshot. It was released on September 15, 2009, through Duck Down Music. Production was handled by Illmind, Black Milk, Khrysis, 9th Wonder, Coptic, DJ Mentplus, Havoc, Marco Polo, MoSS and Nottz. It features guest appearances from Bounty Killer, Heltah Skeltah, Immortal Technique, K'naan, Mary J. Blige, Melanie Fiona, Naledge, Pharoahe Monch, Slug, Smif-N-Wessun, Talib Kweli, the Loudmouf Choir and DJ Revolution.

The album peaked at number 62 on the Billboard 200, number 19 on the Top R&B/Hip-Hop Albums, number 11 on the Top Rap Albums and number 9 on the Independent Albums, with selling around 8,500 copies its first week in the United States.

The lead single, "Robot", was released on May 5, 2009, and accompanying music video, directed by Todd Angkasuwan, debuted as the New Joint of the Day on 106 & Park on September 4, 2009.

== Critical reception ==
Professional ratings
Aggregate scores
Source	Rating
Metacritic	67/100
Review scores
Source	Rating
AllMusic	3.5/5 stars
Robert Christgau	(1-star Honorable Mention)
HipHopDX	3.5/5
Now	3/5 (NNN)
Pitchfork	3.9/10
PopMatters	6/10 stars
Prefix	7/10
RapReviews	10/10
Spin	6/10 stars
XXL	3/5 (L)

Survival Skills was met with generally favorable reviews. At Metacritic, which assigns a normalized rating out of 100 to reviews from mainstream publications, the album received an average score of 67, based on eight reviews.

Steve Juon of RapReviews praised the album with a flawless 10 out of 10, claiming "Buckshot and KRS have achieved something rather remarkable here - an album I can't find a single fault with. There's not a bad beat, there's not a whack rhyme, there's not a collaborator on a track that missed the mark, and the disc itself is neither too short nor too long". AllMusic's David Jeffries stated that "loyal hip-hop heads with a taste for the old-school boom bap shouldn't think twice and won't be disappointed". Prefix Magazine reviewer called it "a call to arms, and a poetic, uncompromising one at that".

In a mixed review, Andrew Rennie of Toronto-based Now said, "KRS-One's wordplay remains clever and topical, especially on the anti-Auto-Tune anthem "Robot", while his sanctimoniousness has been toned down to more tolerable levels. Black Moon's Buckshot is a comfortable pairing and, although his street-savvy sound may not have aged as well as some of his Duck Down Records brethren's, he still finds a familiar dynamic when rapping alongside old cohorts". Writing for Spin, Mosi Reeves stated that "the beats by producers Black Milk, 9th Wonder and Havoc are strictly no-frills, but just hot enough to keep these cranky yet lovable old MCs' joints from stiffening up". Quentin B. Huff of PopMatters reviewed, "Ultimately, Survival Skills does what its creators intended for it to do: to be resolute in its dedication to lyrical acumen and head nodding production. Had they also been more adventurous with the content, the album would have risen to another level". Jesse Serwer of XXL said, "KRS and Buck might have first left Timberland-shaped footprints on hip-hop in the ’80s and early ’90s, respectively, but, on their first collaborative effort, they prove that not much has changed, and it truly is survival of the fittest".

In a negative review, Tom Breihan of Pitchfork wrote, "to catch a glimpse of these guys' past glories in 2009, your best option is still to go see them live; this is just a souvenir".

In his Consumer Guide, veteran music critic Robert Christgau gave the album a one-star honorable mention, saying it was "basically an old-school mixtape, wiser when it instructs the fathers than when it criticizes the sons"; he also picked its two songs "Think of All the Things" and "Runnin' Away".

== Track listing ==
All tracks are written by Kenyatta Blake and Lawrence Parker, with additional contributors noted.

No.	Title	Writer(s)	Producer(s)	Length
1.	"Survival Skills" (featuring DJ Revolution)	Kurt Hoffman; Ramon Ibanga Jr	Illmind	3:59
2.	"Robot"	Kejuan Muchita	Havoc	4:06
3.	"The Way I Live" (featuring Mary J. Blige)	Mary J. Blige; Curtis Cross	Black Milk	3:57
4.	"Clean Up Crew" (featuring Rock)	Jahmal Bush; Ibanga Jr	Illmind	3:57
5.	"Oh Really" (featuring Talib Kweli)	Talib Greene; Marco Bruno	Marco Polo	3:13
6.	"Connection" (featuring Smif-N-Wessun)	Darrell Yates Jr; Tekomin Williams; Jason Connoy	MoSS	5:23
7.	"Runnin' Away" (featuring Immortal Technique)	Felipe Coronel; Cross	Black Milk	4:40
8.	"Think of All the Things" (featuring K'naan)	Keinan Warsame; Marc Vladimir	DJ Mentplus	4:03
9.	"One Shot" (featuring Pharoahe Monch)	Troy Jamerson; Dominick Lamb	Nottz	3:46
10.	"Amazin" (featuring Sean Price and the Loudmouf Choir)	Sean Price; Christopher Tyson	Khrysis	3:47
11.	"Hear No Evil"	Tyson	Khrysis	3:21
12.	"Murder 1" (featuring Bounty Killer)	Rodney Price; Eric Matlock	Coptic	3:59
13.	"We Made It" (featuring Slug)	Sean Daley; Ibanga Jr	Illmind	4:25
14.	"Past Present Future" (featuring Melanie Fiona and Naledge)	Melanie Hallim; Jabari Evans; Patrick Douthit	9th Wonder	4:35
Total length:				56:58

== Charts ==
Chart (2009)	Peak position
US Billboard 200	62
US Top R&B/Hip-Hop Albums (Billboard)	19
US Top Rap Albums (Billboard)	11
US Independent Albums (Billboard)	9
