= National Anthem (album) =

Studio album by The Away Team
- Released: 17 May 2005
- Recorded: 2003–2005
- Studio: Chopp Shopp Studios (Durham, North Carolina)
- Genre: Hip hop
- Label: 6 Hole, Caroline
- Producer: Mischa "Big Dho" Burgess (exec.); Khrysis

The Away Team chronology
| National Anthem (2005) | Training Day (2007) |

Professional ratings
Review scores
| Source | Rating |
|---|---|
| ALARM | (favorable) |
| Exclaim! | (favorable) |
| HipHopDX | 3.5/5 stars |
| Hip Hop Galaxy | (favorable) |
| MVRemix | 6.0/10 stars |
| Okayplayer | 6.5/10 stars |
| Prefix | 5/10 stars |
| RapReviews | 6/10 stars |

National Anthem is the debut album by North Carolina hip hop duo The Away Team, released on 6-Hole Records in 2005. The album features guest appearances from Joe Scudda, Chaundon, Smif-n-Wessun, and Little Brother's Big Pooh and Phonte. It was described by ALARM magazine as "a combination of consistent rhymes and better then [sic] stellar production".

== Release history ==
The album was originally issued in 2005 on 6-Hole Records. It was later issued as part of the National Mayhem Justus League box set.

== Track listing ==
1. "And Now Folks..."
2. "The Competition"
3. "Likka Hi (Last Call)"
4. "The Shining"
5. "Come on Down" (featuring Smif-n-Wessun)
6. "The Blah Blah"
7. "So I Tells the Bitch Right..."
8. "Fuck You"
9. "Let Off a Round"
10. "Me and My Fellows..."
11. "Make It Hot" (featuring Phonte and Joe Scudda)
12. "The End of the Day"
13. "UpNAtem"
14. "One-N-Only" (featuring Percy Miracles)
15. "Always Be Around"
16. "On the Line" (featuring Joe Scudda, Chaundon and Rapper Big Pooh)
17. "Caution" (featuring Impact)
18. "Lights Out"
