= Chemistry (Buckshot and 9th Wonder album) =

Studio album by Buckshot & 9th Wonder
- Released: June 21, 2005
- Recorded: 2004–05
- Studio: Missie Ann Studios (Raleigh, North Carolina)
- Genre: Hip-hop
- Length: 48:20
- Label: Duck Down
- Producer: Buckshot (exec.); Drew "Dru-Ha" Friedman (exec.); 9th Wonder

Buckshot & 9th Wonder chronology
Chemistry (2005)	The Formula (2008)

Chemistry is the first collaborative studio album by American rapper Buckshot and record producer 9th Wonder. It was released on June 21, 2005, through Duck Down Music as a part of the label's "Triple Threat Campaign", preceded by Sean Price's Monkey Barz and followed by Tek & Steele's Smif 'n' Wessun: Reloaded. Recording sessions took place at Missie Ann Studios in Raleigh, North Carolina. Production was handled entirely by 9th Wonder, with Buckshot and Drew "Dru-Ha" Friedman serving as executive producers. It features guest appearances from Keisha Shontelle, Big Pooh, Joe Scudda, L.E.G.A.C.Y., Phonte, Sean Price and Starang Wondah. This album is paralleled by the Black Moon album Alter the Chemistry, which was basically a remix album produced by Da Beatminerz.

The album peaked at number 69 on the US Billboard Top R&B/Hip-Hop Albums, 34 on the Independent Albums and 25 on the Heatseekers Album.

== Critical reception ==
Professional ratings
Review scores
Source	Rating
HipHopDX	4/5
Okayplayer	4/5
Pitchfork	7.8/10
PopMatters	7/10 stars
Prefix	8/10
RapReviews	6/10
Scratch	9/10
Tiny Mix Tapes	4/5 marks
Vibe	3.5/5

Chemistry was met with generally favorable reviews from critics. At Album of the Year, which assigns a normalized rating out of 100 to reviews from mainstream publications, the album received an average score of 77 based on four reviews.

== Track listing ==
All tracks produced by 9th Wonder.

All tracks are written by Kenyatta Blake & Patrick Douthit except where noted.

No.	Title	Writer(s)	Length
1.	"Intro"		0:55
2.	"Chemistry 101"		1:34
3.	"He's Back"		1:54
4.	"Now a Dayz (That's What's Up)"		3:31
5.	"Slippin'"		2:31
6.	"Side Talk"		3:07
7.	"The Ghetto"		4:10
8.	"Food for Thought"		3:12
9.	"No Comparison"		3:43
10.	"Birdz (Fly the Coup)" (featuring Phonte and Keisha Shontelle)	Blake; Douthit; Keisha Hinnant; Phonte Coleman	4:36
11.	"U Wonderin'" (featuring Rapper Big Pooh and Sean Price)	Blake; Douthit; Thomas Jones; Sean Price	4:23
12.	"Out of Town" (featuring L.E.G.A.C.Y. and Joe Scudda)	Blake; Kehinde Harper; Joseph Griffen; Douthit	4:42
13.	"I Don't Know Why" (featuring Keisha Shontelle)	Blake; Hinnant; Douthit	5:28
14.	"Money Makes the World Go Round" (featuring Starang Wondah)	Blake; Douthit; Jack McNair	4:28
Total length:			48:20

== Personnel ==
- Kenyatta "Buckshot" Blake – main artist, vocals (tracks: 2–14), executive producer
- Patrick "9th Wonder" Douthit – main artist, producer, mixing, recording (tracks: 1–8, 10–14)
- Keisha Shontelle – featured artist, vocals (tracks: 10, 13)
- Phonte Coleman – featured artist, vocals (track 10)
- Sean Price – featured artist, vocals (track 11)
- Thomas "Rapper Big Pooh" Jones – featured artist, vocals (track 11)
- Joseph "Joe Scudda" Griffen – featured artist, vocals (track 12)
- Kehinde "L.E.G.A.C.Y." Harper – featured artist, vocals (track 12)
- Jack "Starang Wondah" McNair – featured artist, vocals (track 14)
- Christopher "Khrysis" Tyson – recording (track 9)
- Christopher "Cesar Comanche" Robinson – engineering
- Drew "Dru-Ha" Friedman – executive producer
- Eckō Mindlabs – art direction
- Akash Khokha – additional art direction
- Romeo Tanghal – cover art, illustration
- Raphael Tanghal – cover art, illustration
- Noel Spirandelli – photography
- Mischa "Big Dho" Burgess – management

== Charts ==
Chart (2005)	Peak position
US Top R&B/Hip-Hop Albums (Billboard)	69
US Independent Albums (Billboard)	34
US Heatseekers Albums (Billboard)	25
