= Fatin production discography =

Fatin Horton
- Also known as: 10; 10 for the Triad; Fatin
- Origin: Greensboro, North Carolina, US
- Genres: Hip hop
- Occupation: Record producer
- Years active: 2004–2014
- Labels: It's a Wonderful World Music Group

Fatin "10" Horton, professionally known mononymously as Fatin or by his stage name 10 for the Triad (or simply 10), is an American North Carolina–based record producer affiliated with 9th Wonder's It's a Wonderful World Music Group and a member of the Soul Council production collective. He has produced songs for the likes of KRS-One, Skyzoo, Lloyd Banks, Heltah Skeltah, Jean Grae, Pharoahe Monch, Phonte, Torae and Sean Boog among others. In 2007 Horton provided additional music to the second season of adult animated sitcom The Boondocks, and in 2014 he was a contributing music producer on the second season of adult animated sitcom Black Dynamite.

== Production discography ==
List of songs produced and/or co-produced, with other performing artists, showing year released and album name
Year	Song	Artist	Album	Notes
2004	"You Gon Go?"	KRS-One	Keep Right	N/A
2004	"Phucked"	KRS-One	Keep Right	N/A
2005	"S-K-Y"	Skyzoo	Hall of Justus Presents: Soldiers of Fortune	N/A
2006	"The Cake"	Lloyd Banks, 50 Cent	Rotten Apple	N/A
2007	"Like You"	Sean Price	Jesus Price Supastar	N/A
2007	"Da God"	Sean Price, Sadat X, Buckshot	Jesus Price Supastar	N/A
2008	"Smashmouth"	Jean Grae, K Hill, Edgar Allen Floe, Joe Scudda	Jeanius	N/A
2008	"Da Beginning of da End"	Heltah Skeltah	D.I.R.T. (Da Incredible Rap Team)	N/A
2009	"Clearer Hearing"	Skyzoo	The Power of Words: The Mixtape	N/A
2009	"EXTRAordinary"	Thee Tom Hardy	The Hardy Boy Mystery Mixtape: Curse of the Green Faceded	N/A
2010	"What Is Your Name"	Big Remo, Mela Machinko	Entrapment	N/A
2010	"Trouble Man"	9th Wonder, GQ	9th's Opus: It's a Wonderful World Music Group Vol. 1	N/A
2010	"How We Do It"	Spectac	Spectac Returns: Looks Like Another Job for Spectac	N/A
2011	"Let My People Go"	Pharoahe Monch	W.A.R. (We Are Renegades)	N/A
2011	"Lucky Fella"	TP, Thee Tom Hardy	TP Is My Hero	N/A
2011	"Dream Big"	TP, Rapsody	TP Is My Hero	N/A
2011	"Crossroads"	TP, Phonte	TP Is My Hero	N/A
2011	"Spit Game"	Big Remo, Skyzoo	L-R-G Presents Robin Hood Ree	N/A
2011	"Greatest Love of All"	Heather Victoria	Graffiti Diary	N/A
2011	"Black Cloud"	Sean Boog	The Phantom of the Jamla	N/A
2011	"The Cycle"	Sean Boog	The Phantom of the Jamla	N/A
2011	"Parade Me"	Skyzoo	The Great Debater	N/A
2011	"We Go Off"	Phonte, Pharoahe Monch	Charity Starts at Home	N/A
2011	"Panorama"	Torae, Mela Machinko	For the Record	N/A
2011	"Sizzlin"	Median, Rapsody	The Sender	N/A
2011	"Dead End Love"	HaLo	The Blind Poet	N/A
2011	"Gettin' Close (If You Can See)"	GQ	Trouble Man	N/A
2011	"Escape"	Heather Victoria	Hip Hop Soul Lives	N/A
2012	"Headlights"	Actual Proof, Rapsody	Black Boy Radio	N/A
2012	"The Cool Down (Snippet)"	Thee Tom Hardy, Tyler Woods	Guerrilla Broadcast (Mixtape)	N/A
2012	"Loser"	Rosco P. Coldchain	Almost Famous	N/A
2012	"Medley"	Rosco P. Coldchain	Almost Famous	N/A
2012	"I Got It in Cuz"	Rosco P. Coldchain	Almost Famous	N/A
2012	"The Hippest"	Rosco P. Coldchain	Almost Famous	N/A
2012	"Light the Blow"	Rosco P. Coldchain	Almost Famous	N/A
2012	"All to You Trouble"	Rosco P. Coldchain, Mela Machinko	Almost Famous	N/A
2012	"On My Own"	Rosco P. Coldchain	Almost Famous	N/A
2012	"It's Our World (Tryin' Times)"	Rosco P. Coldchain, D.P., Jean Grae	Almost Famous	N/A
2012	"Welcome Back"	Rosco P. Coldchain	Almost Famous	N/A
2012	"Ain't Nuthin'"	Big Remo, GQ	Sleepwalkers	N/A
2012	"Good Day"	Big Remo, Sadat X	Sleepwalkers	N/A
2013	"Memento"	GQ	Death Threats & Love Notes: The Prelude	N/A
2013	"This Is Me"	GQ, Carlitta Durand	Death Threats & Love Notes: The Prelude	N/A
2014	"Introducing Dynamite"	GQ	A Tribute to Black Dynamite: The Unofficial Mixtape	N/A
2014	"Chicago Wind"	HaLo, Thee Tom Hardy	A Tribute to Black Dynamite: The Unofficial Mixtape	N/A
2014	"STFU (Shut the Fuck Up)"	Torae	A Tribute to Black Dynamite: The Unofficial Mixtape	N/A
2014	"PimpDaddySupaNigga"	GQ, HaLo, Big Remo	A Tribute to Black Dynamite: The Unofficial Mixtape	N/A
2014	"Answers"	Big Remo	A Tribute to Black Dynamite: The Unofficial Mixtape	N/A
2014	"Kung Fu Practice"	Sean Boog, Sundown of Actual Proof, GQ	A Tribute to Black Dynamite: The Unofficial Mixtape	N/A
2014	"Hustler (Puppet Street)"	Pharoahe Monch, Mela Machinko	A Tribute to Black Dynamite: The Unofficial Mixtape	N/A
2014	"That King Pimp Curtis"	Big Remo	A Tribute to Black Dynamite: The Unofficial Mixtape	N/A
2014	"New Black Love"	Rapsody, Mela Machinko	A Tribute to Black Dynamite: The Unofficial Mixtape	N/A
2014	"Cool De La"	Skyzoo	A Tribute to Black Dynamite: The Unofficial Mixtape	N/A
2014	"Shot!"	Jean Grae	A Tribute to Black Dynamite: The Unofficial Mixtape	N/A

== See also ==
- It's a Wonderful World Music Group discography
