= True Links =

EP by Edgar Allen Floe
- Released: June 14, 2005
- Genre: Underground hip hop
- Label: MCEO
- Producer: 9th Wonder, Illmind, Khrysis, Slicemysta, Obsidian Blue, DJ Forge, Picasso

Edgar Allen Floe chronology
True Links (2005)	Floe Almighty (2006)

Professional ratings
Review scores
Source	Rating
AllHipHop.com	4/5 stars
Okayplayer	(83)
HipHopSite.com	3/5 stars
MVRemix	(favourable)

True Links is the first EP by the rapper Edgar Allen Floe.

== Overview ==
It contains nine tracks produced by 9th Wonder, Illmind and others. Only one track has guest vocals: L.E.G.A.C.Y. and Median appear on "The Great Adventure". DJ Ethx considers this to be a reason why True Links is monotonous writing, "[d]epending on your patience or perspective, Mr. Floe's True Links is either a decent, and promising, debut for an artist in his career's infancy or a fairly monotonous listen; one that could have been aided by a bit of versatility in cadence and tone, or perhaps supplemented by more guest vocalists." Similarly, Miles Duncan of Okayplayer considers the EP to have repetitive and monotonous rapping, but also strong production and personal lyrics. Starrene Rhett of AllHipHop.com describes True Links as a "dope listening experience[...] [e]compassing a jazzy sound reminiscent of east coast Hip-Hop circa the early to mid 90s."

== Track listing ==
1. "Intro" – 0:20
2. "The Formula 2005" – 2:48
3. "I for an I" – 3:48
4. "Back in Time" – 4:17
5. "Timelife" – 4:18
6. "Faith in Love" – 3:45
7. "The Great Adventure" (featuring Median and L.E.G.A.C.Y.) – 3:42
8. "Imagine" – 3:28
9. "Livelyhood" – 4:35

== Personnel ==
=== Producers ===
- DJ Forge — track 2
- Illmind — track 3
- Khrysis — track 4
- Obsidian Blue — track 5
- 9th Wonder — track 6, 7
- Picasso — track 8
- Slicemysta (a.k.a. Edgar Allen Floe) — track 9
