= Charity Starts at Home =

Studio album by Phonte
- Released: September 27, 2011
- Recorded: 2011
- Genre: Hip hop; R&B
- Length: 42:52
- Label: Foreign Exchange Music
- Producer: Nicolay (exec.); Phonte (also exec.); 9th Wonder; E. Jones; Fatin "10" Horton; Khrysis; Stro Elliott; Swiff D; Symbolyc One; Zo!

Phonte chronology
Charity Starts at Home (2011)	No News Is Good News (2018)

Charity Starts at Home is the debut solo studio album by American rapper Phonte. The album was released on September 27, 2011, via Foreign Exchange Music. Production was handled by 9th Wonder, E. Jones, Fatin "10" Horton, Khrysis, Stro Elliott, Swiff D, Symbolyc One, Zo! and Phonte, who also served as executive producer together with Nicolay. It features guest appearances from Big K.R.I.T., Carlitta Durand, Elzhi, Eric Roberson, Evidence, Jeanne Jolly, Sy Smith, and fellow Justus League member Median.

The peaked at No. 61 on the Billboard 200, No. 9 on the Top R&B/Hip-Hop Albums, No. 7 on the Top Rap Albums and No. 8 on the Independent Albums with selling nearly 8,000 units in the US in its first week.

== Critical reception ==
Professional ratings
Aggregate scores
Source	Rating
Metacritic	88/100
Review scores
Source	Rating
AllMusic	4/5 stars
HipHopDX	4.5/5
RapReviews	7.5/10
The A.V. Club	A−
Tom Hull	B+
XXL	4/5 (XL)

Charity Starts at Home was met with universal acclaim from critics. At Metacritic, which assigns a normalized rating out of 100 to reviews from mainstream publications, the album received an average score of 88, based on seven reviews.

Nathan Rabin of The A.V. Club stated: "with his gloriously grown-up solo debut, one of the smartest, most incisive lyricists alive proves it's possible to grow older in hip-hop while retaining your dignity". William Ketchum III of HipHopDX praised the album, saying: "with its substantial subject matter, solid production and tightly-woven sequencing, Charity Starts At Home does exactly what a solo debut should: showcases the artist's skill set and personality all at once". AllMusic's Andre Barnes resumed: "a well-balanced marriage of all of Phonte's musical inclinations". Adam Fleischer of XXL said: "undeniably, Charity Starts At Home reminds why the rapper has been a darling of the underground for years". Steve 'Flash' Juon of RapReviews.com found the album "overall above average album that needed a little more of something--a little more 9th Wonder, a little more swagger, a little more about the world of today--and possibly just a little less angst".

== Track listing ==
No.	Title	Writer(s)	Producer(s)	Length
1.	"Dance in the Reign" (featuring Sy Smith)	Phonte Coleman; Sy Smith; Steve Thornton	Swiff D	3:54
2.	"The Good Fight"	Coleman; Patrick Douthit	9th Wonder	3:09
3.	"Everything Is Falling Down" (featuring Jeanne Jolly)	Coleman; Christopher Tyson	Khrysis	3:37
4.	"Not Here Anymore" (featuring Elzhi)	Coleman; Jason Powers; Douthit	9th Wonder	3:49
5.	"Eternally" (featuring Median)	Coleman; James Livingston; Douthit	9th Wonder	4:37
6.	"Sendin' My Love"	Coleman; Stro Elliott	Stro Elliott	3:33
7.	"Ball and Chain"	Coleman; Thornton	Swiff D	3:56
8.	"To Be Yours"	Coleman; Lorenzo Ferguson	Phonte; Zo!	1:32
9.	"Gonna Be a Beautiful Night" (featuring Carlitta Durand)	Coleman; Larry Griffin, Jr.	Symbolyc One	3:44
10.	"We Go Off" (featuring Pharoahe Monch)	Coleman; Troy Jamerson; Fatin Horton	Fatin "10" Horton	2:29
11.	"The Life of Kings" (featuring Evidence and Big K.R.I.T.)	Coleman; Michael Perretta; Justin Scott; Douthit	9th Wonder	3:27
12.	"Who Loves You More" (featuring Eric Roberson)	Coleman; Eric Roberson; Eric Jones	E. Jones	5:07
Total length:				42:52

== Charts ==
Chart (2011)	Peak position
US Billboard 200	61
US Top R&B/Hip-Hop Albums (Billboard)	9
US Independent Albums (Billboard)	8
