= Dyme-A-Duzin =

American rapper (born 1992)

- Born: Donnovan Malik Blocker; May 13, 1992 (age 34); Brooklyn, New York, United States
- Genres: Hip hop
- Occupations: Rapper; singer; songwriter; Actor
- Years active: 2003–present
- Label: Independent. Atlantic (former)
- Website: dymenyc.com

Donnovan Malik Blocker, known by his stage name Dyme-A-Duzin, is an American rapper, singer, songwriter, and actor from Brooklyn, New York. Dyme-A-Duzin is a former member of the band Phony Ppl. From 2008 to 2013, they performed with popular acts such as Erykah Badu, The Roots and Talib Kweli. His song "New Brooklyn" was listed on Spin's 50 Best Rap Songs of 2013 Dyme made his debut with Warner Bros. Records which caught the eyes of not only the industry but fans around the world. Among the many artists and producers Dyme has worked with Fabolous, Joey Bada$$ and Plain Pat.

== Life and career ==
=== Early life and musical beginnings ===
Dyme-A-Duzin was born on May 13, 1992, and grew up in the Crown Heights neighborhood of Brooklyn, New York. Dyme showed an early interest in music, writing his first song at the age of 11 and producing his first music video at the age of 14. He grew up listening to artists such as 50 Cent, Eminem, Kanye West and Jay-Z. Between 2008 and 2011, he released his first three mixtapes via DatPiff, the latter of the three being hosted by Plain Pat. Since their initial release, the mixtapes have gone on to receive over 60,000 views.

=== 2012–2013: Phony Ppl, Warner Bros. Records & A Portrait Of Donnovan ===
On January 17, 2012, Phony Ppl released their debut album titled Phonyland which was critically acclaimed. The album's sound is characterized as having an eclectic sound that borrows from jazz, hip-hop, R&B, funk, soul and rock. In September 2012, Dyme-A-Duzin signed a recording deal with Warner Bros. Records. In January 2013, Dyme-A-Duzin released his fourth mixtape titled A Portrait of Donnovan. The mixtape featured collaborations with Joey Badass, Capital STEEZ, CJ Fly, Plain Pat, Harry Fraud, Sheriff P and Elbee Thrie. In April 2013, Dyme-A-Duzin, became the East Coast Brand Ambassador for the sneaker and apparel brand Puma; his endorsement was renewed in April 2014. In April 2013, Dyme-A-Duzin performed a 10-country European Tour.

=== 2014–2015: Hip Hope, Independence, That Chicken, Conflicts ===
In March 2014, Dyme-A-Duzin did an interview with MsDramaTv and said he wasn't on speaking terms with Joey Badass. The two would have a quick back and forth on twitter before Joey would delete his tweet aimed at Dymes later in the year in August. In April 2014, Dyme-A-Duzin was feature in Puma’s ‘The Shoestring Xperience’ along with international pop group/producers We Are Twin. In September 2014 Dyme-A-Duzin released his fifth mixtape titled Hip Hope. The mixtape featured collaborations with Casey Veggies, Raz Fresco, Kehlani and more. Dyme-A-Duzin signed to Atlantic Records in 2014. In 2015 Dyme parted ways with Atlantic. Regaining his independence he released one of his top streamed singles to date "That Chicken". The song/video received praise from many fans & media outlets. Premiering on The Fader in September and airing on BET JAMS shortly after. The song served as the first single to his debut album "Crown Fried"

=== 2016 - 2017: That Chicken (Remix), 2 Piece tape, Ghetto Olympics ===
In 2016, during the success of the newly released single "That Chicken" Dyme began the "2 Piece Tuesday" series. Releasing 2 songs every 2 weeks via SoundCloud in anticipation of his "Crown Fried" album from Feb-July. The collection of songs ultimately ended up becoming a mixtape of fan favorites called "2 Piece Tape", on the 6th of July. That summer, Dyme's music was brought to the attention of veteran rapper Fabolous. The two Brooklyn natives collaborated for a remix version "That Chicken". "That Chicken" (Remix) quickly gained blog and media traction from outlets such as Rap Radar, XXL & Complex. The record also played frequently on late night radio NY radio shows for Hot 97 & Power 105.1. The music video was recorded in Dyme's hometown of Crown Heights and premiered on WorldStarHipHop. It received over 1 million views its first week. On July 14, 2016, Fabolous invited Dyme out to perform alongside him during his headlining set at the Brooklyn Hip-Hop Festival. On January 21, 2017, Ghetto Olympics releases with the That Chicken remix. The EP was meant to serve as a prelude to Crown Fried. On May 2, Domino's aired a commercial with a jingle written by Dymes called "Build It Back". On November 7, Dymes released the song "Rollie Dreams", serving as the second single for his forthcoming album, "Crown Fried". On December 24, Dymes previews his song "The Rebirth" featuring an old, unreleased STEEZ verse on his Instagram stories

=== 2018:Crown Fried, Beast Coast issues, King Capital controversy, The Rebirth ===
On June 13, 2018, Dymes releases a documentary onto YouTube of the same name as his upcoming album, Crown Fried. Then, on July 6, 2018, Crown Fried released. At some point in 2018, Joey Badass left a comment on Instagram, responding to a fan, claiming: "that verse was actually about Dyme A Duzin. He wrote that verse when he was still in high school. But hey I'm the scumbag here huh". Joey was claiming that Capital STEEZ's verse on the song "Last Straw" by fellow New York rapper Smth was written about Dymes. It's argued amongst fans and theorists that the verse felt more directed towards Joey rather than Dymes, but people clung to this narrative. On December 22, 2018, Tamara Dewar, a sister of Capital STEEZ's, published an article detailing her side of the story when it came to the delays and problems surrounding the unreleased Capital STEEZ album "King Capital". She would go on to bash Joey Badass and make claims that suggests Joey was greedy, manipulative and unreliable. Dyme A Duzin, in an attempt to support the Dewar family, shared the article to his social media accounts. He would receive some backlash from friends who were against and untrusting of Tamara, as well as members of Pro Era and Flatbush Zombies such as Zombie Juice and Aaron Rose. Aaron would go live on his Instagram late into the night of December 23 and proceed to claim STEEZ was not on good terms with Dymes after the "Swank Sinatra" music video. Little known fact, Capital STEEZ and a few others were detained on set for the "Swank Sinatra" music video for allegedly having weed on them, as told by Dymes himself He'd also claim that "Last Straw" was about Dymes, similar to what Joey said. On December 24, 2018, an animated music video for the song "The Rebirth" featuring STEEZ was released.

=== 2019 - 2021: TRAINING., Ghetto Olympics 2, Wutang: An American Saga ===
July 15, 2019, Dymes celebrated the 5th anniversary of Hip Hope by performing live at the National Sawdust venue alongside Ma*JiD. On Sepetmebr 25, 2019, Dymes made an appearance in Wu-Tang: An American Saga series in the 6th episode of the 1st season, "Impossible". In 2020, the corona virus certainly was a major setback on the world but that didn't stop Dymes from releasing music and music videos to accompany them. March 12, 2020, the music video for "Black Man" featuring Devon Bell, originally serving as a single to the upcoming Ghetto Olympics 2 project before being put onto the TRAINING. tape instead. For his birthday, May 13, Dymes drops a freestyle over the Kanye produced "Paid The Price" beat seemingly taking shots at Joey Badass. On October 2, 2020, Bryson Tiller drops his long awaited sophomore album Anniversary with the song "Sorrows". The song's instrumental was given to Bryson by Dymes, who was supposed to feature on it. Dymes took to social media to call out Bryson Tiller for essentially stealing his beat and would respond with his own version called "Sorrows Freestyle" which dropped February 9, 2021, and was part of a marathon series called "#GO2uesdays" where Dymes would release new songs every Tuesday. A music video for the song followed shortly after a month later on March 9, though it would be reuploaded the 23rd without the lyrics on display. Another month later on April 9, 2021, TRAINING. releases. On the tape, Dymes would redo his "Paid The Price" freestyle into "The Torch" featuring Eli McFly, as well as his "Cold Summer" freestyle into "Cold Winter". July 30, 2021, Ghetto Olympics 2 would finally release, accompanied by a documentary type of short film.

=== 2022 - Present: TRAINING 2., "Charged Up" Domino's jingle, Ghetto Olympics 3, Solely Yours EP ===
On June 10, 2022, Dymes would drop the 2nd installment to his training tape with TRAINING 2. July 1, 2022, Dymes would go on to do an interview with the On The Radar podcast where he talked about his newest project, Joey Badass, Capital STEEZ, Jack Harlow shouting him and his song "Body on Me" & Kehlani. Later in the year in December, Domino's would go on to air another jingle written and performed by Dymes called "Charged Up" which was a part of their 2023 campaign. June 30, 2023, Dymes would release a new single titled "Underground Hov" and be featured in the Juice Films video series to perform it. September 18, "Playas Only", with just Rome Streetz featured, would release as a single. January 12, 2024, "House" drops. Later, on the 21st, Dymes took to Instagram to reminisce on the release of the first Ghetto Olympics project, teasing the upcoming third installment. February 16, "Ms. Parker" drops. March 15, "Us never Them" drops. April 5, "Trauma" drops. May 1, Dymes took to Instagram to promote his following single, "Barbershop (Conversations)" featuring Bishop Nehru. On the same promo post, Dymes teased that Ghetto Olympics 3 the album was on the way. On Dyme's birthday, May 13, "Barbershop (Conversations)" dropped. On June 14, "Legends 3" featuring Jayy Grams dropped. Dymes would take the time to pay his respect to Jayy Grams, who died April 26. Dymes would drop one more single with "Blessings Falling" featuring LIFEOFTHOM & Broadway Joe, before finally dropping Ghetto Olympics 3 on the 26th. On January 7, 2025, Daylyt dropped his "HIYU" response track to Joey Badass's "The Ruler's Back", where Dymes would be namedropped. Dymes himself would remain relatively quiet until April, 7 when "Street Dream" drops, serving as the first single to his "SOLELY YOURS" EP. Later on May 9, "RIP UE (Rest In Peace Unemployment)" would drop as the second single off Solely Yours. Finally, on May 16, Dyme's "Solely Yours" EP would release. The projected featured a remix of Daylyt's HIYU, with Dymes addressing claims Joey made at the beginning of the year. On July 20, Dymes tweeted about bringing back the YouTube cypher. Then later on the 29th, Dymes tweeted he'd turn his next single into a cypher by sending the instrumental to artists who want to get involved. The next day, Dymes called out YouTubers Kito Abashi, Curtiss King, hip-hop commentator Jeremy Hecht, and rappers Kai Ca$h & Mick Jenkins on twitter to feature on the cypher. Curtiss King would record his verse for Dyme's "No Music Cypher" live on YouTube. Dymes would preview a chorus and verse, submitted by Kito Abashi, on his Instagram story the following day. By August 3, Dymes tweeted that he received a verse from YouTuber J Nolan, and had another incoming from YouTuber Scru Face Jean. August 4, battle rapper Chilla Jones tweeted at Dymes wanting to join the cypher. By September 26, Dymes tweeted he received Chilla Jone's vocals, and by October 1, Dymes premiered "No Music Cypher" live on Curtiss King's YouTube channel. The song officially released October 3, featuring Curtiss King, Scru Face Jean, J Nolan, Jeremy Hecht, Chilla Jones & Kito Abashi. Both Kai Ca$h and Mick Jenkins did not make appearances.

== Discography ==
=== Extended plays ===
- Nothing Special (with Phony Ppl) (2012)
- Ghetto Olympics (2017)
- TRAINING (with Money Montage) (2021)
- Solely Yours (2025)

=== Albums ===
- Crown Fried (2018)
- WD, Vol. 1 (2026)

=== Mixtapes ===
- Shut Up 'n' Listen (2008)
- WTF is Phonyland? (with Phony Ppl) (2009)
- The Orientation (2010)
- 20=X (2011)
- Phonyland (with Phony Ppl) (2012)
- A Portrait of Donnovan (2013)
- Hip Hope (2014)
- 2 Piece Tape (2016)
- Ghetto Olympics 2 (GO2) (2021)
- TRAINING 2 (with Money Montage) (2022)
- Ghetto Olympics 3 (with Money Montage) (2024)
- Ghetto Olympics 3 (GO3 Deluxe) (2024)

=== Guest appearances ===
List of non-single guest appearances, with other performing artists, showing year released and album name
Title	Year	Artist(s)	Album
"Track 4"	2009	Capital Steez, Jakk the Rhymer, Elbee Thrie	The Yellow Tape
"Forever" (YouTube Remix)	2011	Ahmir, Timothy DeLaGhetto, Dumbfoundead, Prince EA, RUSSELL! (D-Pryde)	(Non-album single)
"Everlasting"	2012	Omen, Denzil Porter, XV	(Non-album single)
"You"	2012	9th Wonder, Buckshot	The Solution
"New Brooklyn" (Remix)	2013	Peter Rosenberg, Flatbush Zombies, The Underachievers	The New York Renaissance
"4get About It"	2013	Peter Rosenberg	The New York Renaissance
"Eye's Low"	2013	T-Shyne, Hefna Gwap	Sloppy Tuna
Mad Izm	2015	Hakim Green, Keith Murray, Minty Burns, Treach, Do It All	Underground Burn Music
Kick In The Door (Remix)	2015	Kev the Pope, Skyzoo, Novacane	(Non-album single)
"The Good Fight"	2015	Ace Clark	The Good Fight
"Run The World"	2016	Minty Burns	(Non-album single)
"BIGGIE CAPO"	2017	Quality, KAS, Phil Walker, Connie Diiamond	(Non-album single)
"BACONEGGANDCHEESE"	2020	GODBODYWATI, TOPPRRAAA	(Non-album single)
"Wait & See"	2023	James Major, Mic Anthony	The Major League
"Screams From The Ghetto"	2023	Theoryetti	Mary Jane Sells Herself 2
"Playas Only"	2023	Money Montage, Stro, Daylyt, Rome Streetz, Don Mykel	All Out Of Favors
"Fussin & Fightin" (Remix)	2023	Raydy J	The Wrap Up
"96 Draft Class"	2024	Lashawn Freeman, Retrospec, Passport Rev, Leoh My God, Naj Isdope	Da SLAM Mag
