= Mic Tyson =

Studio album by Sean Price
- Released: October 30, 2012
- Genre: Hip-hop
- Length: 41:00
- Label: Duck Down
- Producer: Sean Price (exec.); 9th Wonder; Alchemist; AMP; Beat Butcha; Eric G; Evidence; Khrysis; Wool; Quelle Chris; Statik Selektah; Team Demo; DJ Babu (co.)

Sean Price chronology
| Jesus Price Supastar (2007) | Mic Tyson (2012) | Imperius Rex (2017) |

Singles from Mic Tyson
- 1. "STFU, Part 2" Released: October 5, 2012

Mic Tyson is the third solo studio album by American rapper Sean Price. It was released on October 30, 2012, through Duck Down Music. Production was handled by Alchemist, Beat Butcha, Eric G, Evidence, 9th Wonder, AMP, Khrysis and Wool. It features guest appearances from Buckshot, Ill Bill, Pharoahe Monch, Pumpkinhead, Realm Reality, Ruste Juxx, Torae, Ike Eyes and Freddie Gibbs.

The album sold 7,000 copies in its first week and debuted at number 59 on the Billboard 200.

"STFU, Part 2" was released as a promotional single with animated music video directed by the Chain Gang.

It was the last album to be released in Price's lifetime before his death on August 8, 2015.

== Background ==
Sean Price announced the album to the public in mid-2009 by releasing a mixtape titled Kimbo Price: A Prelude to Mic Tyson, which contains 23 tracks. In an interview with VladTV he stated that "he's tryin' to fuck everybody on this album". He calls it Mic Tyson "because he's from Brownsville and that he knows how to fight".

In an interview with Grand Angel TV, he stated that the only confirmed guest thus far was rapper Chali 2na. However he did not make the final cut of the album. In that same year, he spoke with Conspiracy Radio regarding the producers slated on the album, which are Stu Bangas, The Alchemist, Evidence, Sid Roams (who as well did not make the final cut), 9th Wonder, (who has appeared on Price's two previous studio albums), Beat Butcha, etc.

In 2012 three videos on YouTube Dallas Penn channel surfaced of Price previewing tracks off of Mic Tyson, and after many of the pushbacks, Price stated that the album would see release in July. However it was pushed back, yet again, to October 30, which ended up being the actual release date.

== Critical reception ==
Professional ratings
Aggregate scores
| Source | Rating |
|---|---|
| Metacritic | 80/100 |
Review scores
| Source | Rating |
| AllMusic | 4/5 stars |
| Exclaim! | 9/10 |
| HipHopDX | 4/5 |
| RapReviews | 8.5/10 |
| XXL | 4/5 (XL) |

Mic Tyson was met with generally favorable reviews. At Metacritic, which assigns a normalized rating out of 100 to reviews from mainstream publications, the album received an average score of 80, based on seven reviews.

Mark Bozzer of Exclaim! stated "Young rappers take notice: you want to sound like this when you get older". Steve 'Flash' Juon of RapReviews praised the album saying "Sean Price has rarely if ever lost a step and Mic Tyson is not going to be the time that he did". AllMusic's David Jeffries said "Price's material-starved fans are craving his words more than beats, so don't call it a comeback but a wicked, wordy return". HipHopDX reviewer RomanCooper said "It's a matter of execution, and in that regard, fans will have little to complain about". Writing for XXL, David "Rek" Lee said that "these verses could've fit on any of his past records or mixtapes. But the production on Mic Tyson ties them together nicely".

== Track listing ==
| No. | Title | Writer(s) | Producer(s) | Length |
|---|---|---|---|---|
| 1. | "The Genesis of the Omega" (Intro) | Sean Price; Alan Maman | The Alchemist | 2:00 |
| 2. | "Bar-Barian" | Price; Maman | The Alchemist | 2:09 |
| 3. | "Pyrex" | Price; W. Hendricks | AMP | 2:34 |
| 4. | "Price & Shining Armor" (featuring Ruste Juxx) | Price; Victor Evans; J. Doherty | Wool | 3:04 |
| 5. | "Title Track" | Price; Eric Gabouer | Eric G. | 2:30 |
| 6. | "Straight Music" | Price; Patrick Douthit | 9th Wonder | 2:09 |
| 7. | "STFU, Pt. 2" | Price; Maman | The Alchemist | 2:58 |
| 8. | "Hush" | Price; Christopher Tyson | Khrysis | 2:35 |
| 9. | "Solomon Grundy" (featuring Ill Bill and Ike Eyes) | Price; William Braunstein; Gabouer | Eric G. | 3:48 |
| 10. | "Frankenberry" (featuring Buckshot) | Price; Kenyatta Blake; Stuart Hudgens | Stu Bangas | 2:20 |
| 11. | "BBQ Sauce" (featuring Pharoahe Monch) | Price; Troy Jamerson; Michael Perretta; Chris Oroc | Evidence; DJ Babu (co.) | 3:05 |
| 12. | "Bully Rap" (featuring Realm Reality) | Price; Rick Gonzalez; Maman | The Alchemist | 3:45 |
| 13. | "By the Way" (featuring Torae) | Price; Torae Carr; Perretta | Evidence | 2:26 |
| 14. | "Battering Bars" (featuring Pumpkinhead) | Price; Robert A. Diaz; Eliot Dubock | Beat Butcha | 2:52 |
| 15. | "The Hardest Nigga Out" | Price; Dubock | Beat Butcha | 2:47 |
| Total length: | | | | 41:00 |

iTunes bonus tracks
| No. | Title | Writer(s) | Producer(s) | Length |
|---|---|---|---|---|
| 16. | "Haraam" | Price | Team Demo | 3:00 |
| 17. | "Remember" (featuring Freddie Gibbs) | Price; Frederick Tipton | Statik Selektah | 2:58 |
| 18. | "I See" | Price | Quelle Chris | 0:59 |
| Total length: | | | | 48:00 |

Amazon bonus track
| No. | Title | Writer(s) | Producer(s) | Length |
|---|---|---|---|---|
| 16. | "Let Me Tell You" | Price; Dubock | Beat Butcha | 2:06 |

== Personnel ==
- Sean Price – executive producer
- Kenyatte "Buckshot" Blake – associate executive producer
- Drew "Dru-Ha" Friedman – associate executive producer
- "Dan The Man" Humiston – mixing
- Michael Sarsfield – mastering
- Raphael Tanghal – cover art
- Jacqueline Shao – artwork
- Skrilla – artwork
- Haroon Gilani – back cover art

== Charts ==
| Chart (2012) | Peak position |
|---|---|
| US Billboard 200 | 59 |
| US Top R&B/Hip-Hop Albums (Billboard) | 9 |
| US Top Rap Albums (Billboard) | 7 |
| US Independent Albums (Billboard) | 10 |
| US Indie Store Album Sales (Billboard) | 22 |
