= Jesus Price Supastar =

Studio album by Sean Price
- Released: January 30, 2007
- Recorded: 2006
- Studio: Missie Ann Studios (Raleigh, North Carolina); Tee Studios (Oslo, Norway)
- Genre: East Coast hip-hop; hardcore hip-hop
- Length: 47:27
- Label: Duck Down
- Producer: Buckshot (exec.); Drew "Dru-Ha" Friedman (exec.); 9th Wonder; 10 for the Triad; Illmind; Khrysis; Masse; MoSS; P.F. Cuttin'; Tommy Tee

Sean Price chronology
Monkey Barz (2005)	Jesus Price Supastar (2007)	Mic Tyson (2012)

Singles from Jesus Price Supastar
- 1. "P-Body" Released: February 2007

Jesus Price Supastar is the second solo studio album by American rapper Sean Price of Heltah Skeltah and Boot Camp Clik. Originally planned to be released on September 19, 2006, it was pushed back to October 31, and then was pushed back for the third time, to a final release date on January 30, 2007. Duck Down Music CEO Drew "Dru-Ha" Friedman stated, "We all just decided together that the extra time would do us right for promotions and raising awareness".

Production was handled by 9th Wonder, Khrysis, 10 for the Triad, Illmind, MoSS, P.F. Cuttin' and Tommy Tee. It features guest appearances from Rock, Buckshot, Block McCloud, Chaundon, Flood, Phonte, Ruste Juxx, Sadat X, Skyzoo, Steele and the Loudmouf Choir.

The album peaked at number 196 on the Billboard 200 and number 60 on the Top R&B/Hip-Hop Albums in the United States.

== Critical reception ==
Professional ratings
Review scores
Source	Rating
AllMusic	4/5 stars
Cokemachineglow	50%
HipHopDX	4/5
laut.de	4/5 stars
Prefix	8.5/10
RapReviews	8.5/10
Spin	3/5 stars
XXL	4/5 (XL)

Jesus Price Supastar was met with generally favorable reviews. At Album of the Year, which assigns a normalized rating out of 100 to reviews from mainstream publications, the album received an average score of 72, based on six reviews.

=== Accolades ===
Accolades for Jesus Price Supastar
Publication	Accolade	Rank	Ref.
Prefix	Best Albums of 2007: Picks 50 to 11	24	

== Track listing ==
No.	Title	Writer(s)	Producer(s)	Length
1.	"Intro (Jesus Price)"	Sean Price; Felix Rovira	P.F. Cuttin'	1:46
2.	"Like You"	Price; Fatin Horton	10 for the Triad	3:28
3.	"P-Body" (featuring Rock)	Price; Jahmal Bush; Patrick Douthit	9th Wonder	3:12
4.	"Cardiac" (featuring Buckshot, Ruste Juxx and Flood)	Price; Kenyatta Blake; Victor Evans; Flood; Ramon Ibanga	Illmind	3:48
5.	"Stop"	Price; Christopher Tyson	Khrysis	3:34
6.	"Violent"	Price; Douthit	9th Wonder	3:04
7.	"Da God" (featuring Sadat X and Buckshot)	Price; Blake; Horton	10 for the Triad	2:37
8.	"Oops Upside Your Head" (featuring Steele)	Price; Darrell Yates Jr.; Jason Connoy	MoSS	3:55
9.	"Church" (featuring Rock and the Loudmouf Choir)	Price; Bush; Morten Eliassen; Tommy Flaaten	Tommy Tee	2:48
10.	"King Kong" (featuring Rock)	Price; Tyson	Khrysis	1:51
11.	"One"	Price; Tyson	Khrysis	3:17
12.	"You Already Know" (featuring Skyzoo)	Price; Gregory Taylor; Douthit	9th Wonder	1:19
13.	"Directors Cut"	Price; Tyson; T. Williams	Khrysis	3:18
14.	"Let It Be Known" (featuring Phonte)	Price; Phonte Coleman; Douthit	9th Wonder	3:05
15.	"Hearing Aid" (featuring Chaundon)	Price; Finian St. Omer; Douthit	9th Wonder	3:56
16.	"Mess You Made" (featuring Block McCloud)	Price; Ismael Diaz; Masse Beats	MoSS	3:56
Total length:				47:27

== Charts ==
Chart (2007)	Peak position
US Billboard 200	196
US Top R&B/Hip-Hop Albums (Billboard)	60
US Independent Albums (Billboard)	16
US Heatseekers Albums (Billboard)	3
