= Monkey Barz =

Studio album by Sean Price
- Released: May 31, 2005
- Recorded: 2001–2005
- Studio: Missie Ann Studios (Raleigh, NC); Wax Museum (Brooklyn, NY); Da Man Studios (New York, NY)
- Genre: Hip-hop
- Length: 54:11
- Label: Duck Down
- Producer: Buckshot (exec.); Drew "Dru-Ha" Friedman (exec.); 9th Wonder; Agallah; Ayatollah; Dub.Z; Edward Maximillion III; Justice; Khrysis; Kleph Dollaz; MoSS; P.F. Cuttin'; Phat Babyz; Star.com; Tone Mason; TY Deals

Sean Price chronology
Monkey Barz (2005)	Jesus Price Supastar (2007)

Singles from Monkey Barz
- 1. "Rising To The Top / Spit Game" Released: 2002; 2. "Boom Bye Yeah / 60 Bar Dash" Released: July 27, 2004; 3. "Onion Head" Released: 2005

Professional ratings
Review scores
Source	Rating
AllMusic	4/5 stars
Prefix	7/10
RapReviews	8/10
The Source	3.5/5 stars

Monkey Barz is the debut solo studio album by American Brooklyn-based rapper Sean Price of Heltah Skeltah. It was released on May 31, 2005 through Duck Down Records as a part of the label's "Triple Threat Campaign", followed by Buckshot's Chemistry and Tek & Steele's Smif 'n' Wessun: Reloaded. The cover art is based on the Planet of the Apes series. Production was handled by Khrysis, TY Deals, Agallah, 9th Wonder, Ayatollah, Dub Z, Edward Maximillion III, Justice, Kleph Dollaz, MoSS, P.F. Cuttin', Phat Babyz, Star.com and Tone Mason, with Buckshot and Drew "Dru-Ha" Friedman serving as executive producers. It features guest appearances from fellow Boot Camp Clik members Buckshot, Louieville Sluggah, Rock, Starang Wondah, Steele, Tek, and affiliate Ruste Juxx.

Despite being charted only at number 70 on the Top R&B/Hip-Hop Albums and number 46 on the Independent Albums in the United States, the album was met with generally favorable reviews. Its lead single, "Boom Bye Yeah", peaked at number 68 on the Hot R&B/Hip-Hop Singles Sales.

Music videos were shot for the songs "Peep My Words", "Onionhead", "Heartburn", "Boom Bye Yeah", "Monkey Barz" and "Slapboxing", which were included on Price's DVD Passion of Price. The album's bonus track "Rising to the Top" was included in the soundtrack to 2001 video game Grand Theft Auto III and can be heard on its fictional radio station Game Radio FM.

== Track listing ==
No.	Title	Writer(s)	Producer(s)	Length
1.	"Peep My Words"	Sean Price; Darrol Durant	Kleph Dollaz	2:31
2.	"One Two Yall"	Price; Jason Connoy	MoSS	3:31
3.	"Onion Head" (featuring Tek)	Price; Tekomin Williams; Christopher Tyson	Khrysis	3:01
4.	"Fake Neptune" (featuring Buckshot, Steele and Louieville Sluggah)	Price; Kenyatta Blake; Darrell Yates Jr.; Barret Powell; Rudolph Jones	Rudy Roxx	3:34
5.	"Heartburn"	Price; Patrick Douthit	9th Wonder	4:02
6.	"Shake Down" (featuring Starang Wondah and Steele)	Price; Jack McNair; Yates Jr.; D. Pearson; A. Davis	Star.com; Justice	3:52
7.	"Mad Mann"	Price; Felix Rovira	P.F. Cuttin'	3:45
8.	"Brokest Rapper You Know"	Price; T. Walker	TY Deals	1:34
9.	"Boom Bye Yeah"	Price; Aloysius Brown	Tone Mason	3:13
10.	"I Love You (Bitch)"	Price; Jeff Steinbacher	Dub Dot Z	3:20
11.	"Bye Bye" (featuring Buckshot)	Price; Blake; Tyson	Khrysis	3:40
12.	"Spliff N Wessun" (featuring Ruste Juxx)	Price; Victor Evans; Lamont Dorrell	Ayatollah	2:57
13.	"Jail Shit" (featuring Rock)	Price; Jahmal Bush; Angel Aguilar	Agallah	3:24
14.	"Monkey Barz"	Price; Walker	TY Deals	3:16
15.	"Slap Boxing" (featuring Ruste Juxx and Rock)	Price; Evans; Bush; Edward Maximillion III	Edward Maximillion III	3:28
16.	"Rising to the Top (Grand Theft Auto Theme Song)" (featuring Agallah)	Price; Aguilar	Agallah	5:03
Total length:				54:11

Notes

- Track 9 featured additional vocals by 5ft
- Track 16 is listed as bonus track and featured vocals by Bazaar Royale

== Charts ==
Chart (2005)	Peak position
US Top R&B/Hip-Hop Albums (Billboard)	70
US Independent Albums (Billboard)	46
