= Edgar Allen Floe =

American rapper

- Also known as: Slicemysta
- Born: Daryl Sams; January 26, 1978 (age 48)
- Origin: Raleigh-Durham, North Carolina
- Genres: Hip Hop
- Occupations: rapper, producer
- Years active: 1996–present
- Labels: MCEO, Shaman Work, Balance Coalition (BalCo)
- Website: eafloe.com

Daryl Sams, known professionally as Edgar Allen Floe (born January 26, 1978) is a hip hop artist from North Carolina and a member of Justus League and The Undefined. His name is a play on words of the name of the famous writer, Edgar Allan Poe.

== Biography ==
Floe's early ambition in hip hop was to become a DJ rather than an MC, but hearing his uncle playing records by the likes of Rakim and Ice Cube led to Floe writing his first lyrics at the age of 14. Mal Demolish, Floe's partner in the group The Undefined, gave him this name in 1996, and Floe stuck with it saying, "Edgar Allan Poe was a well-respected writer and storyteller. I tried to incorporate that into my standpoint. He was a dope writer; I'm trying to be a well respected and dope writer, so it all goes hand in hand." He has released one EP, True Links (2005) and two mixtapes, Floe Almighty (2006, with a remixed version released later) and The Road to The Streetwise (2008). All contain production from Khrysis and 9th Wonder. Floe also produces on these albums under the alias SliceMysta. Floe Almighty received mixed reviews from critics, several frustrated at the delays in releasing his first album.

Floe released his first full-length album, The Streetwise LP, on October 28, 2008, on his own record label, MCEO Records, just as True Links was. The Streetwise LP has guest appearances by Median, L.E.G.A.C.Y. and Sean Boog of The Away Team, and was positively received by critics, with one writing, "Floe raps from a pulpit of authority that not many emcees rival." He is planning to release a project with Mal Demolish.

Floe worked as a consultant in Artist development for 9th Wonder's Jamla Records label.

Floe opened his new website, eafloe.com, on his birthday in 2012. The site included Floe's music catalog, as well as articles pertaining to health, wealth, self-knowledge, the music business and other topics. The site was taken down for some time, but has since been revamped and reactivated.

== Discography ==
=== Solo albums ===
- True Links EP (2005) MCEO
- Floe Almighty (mixtape) (2006) Shaman Work Recordings
- Floe Almighty The Remixture (2007) MCEO
- Road to the Streetwise LP (mixtape) (2008)
- The Streetwise LP (2008) MCEO
- Floetry In Motion [digital] (2012) MCEO / Mass Media
- BALCO Theme EP (2025) Balance Coalition Music Group

=== Group albums ===
- Plan U [with The Undefined]

=== Singles ===
- "The Torch" (2006)
- "BALCO Theme" (2024)
