= The Formula (album) =

Studio album by 9th Wonder & Buckshot
- Released: April 29, 2008
- Recorded: 2007–08
- Studio: De Stu at North Carolina Central University (Durham, North Carolina)
- Genre: Hip-hop
- Length: 47:39
- Label: Duck Down
- Producers: Buckshot (exec.); Drew "Dru-Ha" Friedman (exec.); 9th Wonder

9th Wonder & Buckshot chronology
Chemistry (2005)	The Formula (2008)	The Solution (2012)

Singles from The Formula
- 1. "Go All Out" Released: 2008

The Formula is the second collaborative studio album by American rapper Buckshot and record producer 9th Wonder. It was released on April 29, 2008 through Duck Down Music. Recording sessions took place at De Stu at North Carolina Central University in Durham, North Carolina. Production was handled entirely by 9th Wonder, with Buckshot and Drew "Dru-Ha" Friedman serving as executive producers. It features guest appearances from Carlitta Durand, Arafat Yates, Big Chops, Keisha Shontelle, Swan, Talib Kweli, Tyler Woods and the Formula Crew. The album debuted at #137 on the Billboard 200 album chart, opening with 5,874 units sold.

A music video for the album's lead single "Go All Out" was directed by Drew "Dru-Ha" Friedman and Rik Cordero and features an appearance from comedian Charlie Murphy. Music videos were also shot for the tracks "Hold It Down" and "The Formula".

== Critical reception ==
Professional ratings
Aggregate scores
Source	Rating
Metacritic	68/100
Review scores
Source	Rating
AllMusic	3/5 stars
The A.V. Club	C+
HipHopDX	4/5
Pitchfork	5.7/10
RapReviews	8/10
The Skinny	3/5 stars
Spin	3/5 stars

The Formula was met with generally favorable reviews. At Metacritic, which assigns a normalized rating out of 100 to reviews from mainstream publications, the album received an average score of 68, based on ten reviews.

Emilee Woods of RapReviews praised the album, saying "minor complaints aside, 9th and Buck have definitely upped the ante on their debut, so much so that a re-naming might be in order". Writing for Spin, Mosi Reeves stated "despite its title, The Formula has its charms". The A.V. Club reviewer Nathan Rabin said "The Formula should please 9th Wonder and Boot Camp Clik cultists, but hip-hop heads eager to hear 9th Wonder collaborate with rappers worthy of his talents are better off waiting for his next album with Murs--or praying for a reunion with Little Brother". Evan McGarvey of Pitchfork said "...but even with 9th's craftsmanship, the melodies, like Buckshot's lyrics are vacuum-sealed. There's a pianissimo modesty that positively sucks the album dry".

== Track listing ==
All Tracks produced by Patrick "9th Wonder" Douthit.

All tracks are written by Kenyatta Blake & Patrick Douthit except where noted.

No.	Title	Writer(s)	Length
1.	"Intro - The Formula" (featuring The Formula Crew)	Kenyatta Blake; Patrick Douthit	3:57
2.	"Ready (Brand New Day)"	Blake; Douthit	3:52
3.	"Be Cool" (featuring Swan)	Blake; Douthit	3:08
4.	"Go All Out (No Doubt!!!)" (featuring Carlitta Durand)	Blake; Douthit	3:39
5.	"No Future"	Blake; Douthit	3:04
6.	"Hold It Down" (featuring Talib Kweli and Tyler Woods)	Blake; Douthit; Talib Kweli Greene; Tyler Woods	4:30
7.	"Whassup With U" (featuring Keisha Shontelle)	Blake; Douthit; Keisha Hinnant; Curtis Mayfield	4:50
8.	"One for You (Big Lou)"	Blake; Douthit	2:47
9.	"Just Display"	Blake; Douthit	2:53
10.	"Here We Go"	Blake; Douthit	4:51
11.	"Throwin' Shade"	Blake; Douthit	3:24
12.	"Shinin' Y'all" (featuring Arafat Yates and Big Chops)	Blake; Douthit; V. Kerns; K. Dickens	3:33
13.	"Man Listen (Cause Ummm)" (featuring Carlitta Durand)	Blake; Douthit	3:11
Total length:			47:39

== Personnel ==
- Kenyatta "Buckshot" Blake – main artist, executive producer
- Patrick "9th Wonder" Douthit – main artist, producer, recording
- Swan – featured artist (track 3)
- Carlitta Durand – featured artist (tracks: 4, 13)
- Talib Kweli – featured artist (track 6)
- Tyler Woods – featured artist (track 6)
- Keisha Shontelle – featured artist (track 7)
- Arafat Yates – featured artist (track 12)
- Big Chops of M1 Platoon – featured artist (track 12)
- Beat Justice – additional vocals (track 1)
- Brittany B – additional vocals (track 1)
- Chi Chi – additional vocals (track 1)
- The World Famous Danny Boy – additional vocals (track 1)
- Ian Schreier – mixing
- Michael Sarsfield – mastering
- Drew "Dru-Ha" Friedman – executive producer
- Skrilla – design, layout
- Robert Adam Mayer – photography
- Noah Friedman – project coordinator, marketing direction

== Charts ==
Chart (2005)	Peak position
US Billboard 200	137
US Top R&B/Hip-Hop Albums (Billboard)	47
US Independent Albums (Billboard)	17
US Heatseekers Albums (Billboard)	2
