= Training Day (album) =

Studio album by The Away Team
- Released: November 27, 2007
- Recorded: 2006–2007
- Studio: Chopp Shopp Studios, Durham, North Carolina
- Genre: Hip hop
- Label: Hall of Justus
- Producer: Khrysis

The Away Team chronology
National Anthem (2005)	Training Day (2007)	The Warm Up (2009)

Training Day is the second album by North Carolina hip hop duo The Away Team, was released in November 27, 2007 on the Hall of Justus label, featuring contributions from unofficial third member Nervous Reck, Evidence (of Dilated Peoples), Sean Price, Black Milk, Supastition and Darien Brockington.

== Track listing ==
1. Scream Out!!
2. Look at Me (featuring Nervous Reck)
3. Sum of Me (featuring Evidence & Darien Brockington)
4. Awesome (featuring Billionz)
5. The Odds
6. Steppin' on Toes
7. Chitter Chatter (featuring Black Milk)
8. Rockabye (featuring Supastition & Nervous Reck)
9. Greedy
10. Don't Wait
11. Psycho Ward (featuring Sean Price)
12. I'm a Fool
