= Scars & Stripes =

Studio album by The Away Team
- Released: October 11, 2011
- Studios: Brightlady Studios (Raleigh, NC); BoardRoom Studios (Raleigh, NC)
- Genre: Hip-hop
- Length: 58:29
- Labels: Jamla; Duck Down
- Producer: Khrysis

The Away Team chronology
The Warm Up (2009)	Scars & Stripes (2011)

Professional ratings
Review scores
Source	Rating
AllMusic	3/5 stars

Scars & Stripes is the fourth studio album by American hip-hop duo the Away Team. It was released on October 11, 2011 via Jamla/Duck Down Music. The recording sessions took place at Brightlady Studios and BoardRoom Studios in Raleigh, North Carolina. Produced entirely by member Khrysis, it features guest appearances from Actual Proof, Big Remo, Blue Raspberry, Evidence, GQ, Halo, Heather Victoria, Jay Rush, Kelsey Lu, King Mez, Laws, Phonte, Rapsody, Talib Kweli and Zo!.

== Track listing ==
No.	Title	Writer(s)	Length
1.	"Intro"	Christopher Tyson; Sean Evans	1:29
2.	"Bad News" (featuring King Mez and Blue Raspberry)	Tyson; Evans; Morris Wayne Ricks II	3:11
3.	"Scars & Stripes"	Tyson; Evans	3:04
4.	"4 the People"	Tyson	1:07
5.	"Cheers" (featuring Heather Victoria)	Tyson; Evans; Heather Victoria Gavin	2:54
6.	"What Is This" (featuring Evidence)	Tyson; Evans; Michael Perretta	4:16
7.	"The Road to Redemption"	Tyson; Evans	3:56
8.	"Drift"	Tyson; Evans	3:15
9.	"Set It Off" (featuring Talib Kweli and Rapsody)	Tyson; Evans; Marlanna Evans; Talib Kweli Greene	3:08
10.	"Hapenin' Today"	Tyson; Evans	1:30
11.	"Hot Potato" (featuring HaLo and Sundown)	Tyson; Evans; A. Holmes; Shakeer Fullenweider	4:34
12.	"I Ain't Mad" (featuring Jay Rush)	Tyson; Evans; Johnathan Jennings	3:56
13.	"Paid" (featuring Laws and Big Remo)	Tyson; Evans; R. Cash; Michael Maldonado	4:20
14.	"Proceed" (featuring Enigma)	Tyson; Evans; S. Hendricks	4:17
15.	"Get Down" (featuring GQ)	Tyson; Evans; Quentin Thomas	3:47
16.	"Picture This" (featuring Kelsey Lu)	Tyson; Evans; Kelsey McJunkins	4:04
17.	"See U Later" (featuring Phonte)	Tyson; Evans; Phonte Coleman; Lorenzo Ferguson	5:41
Total length:			58:29

== Personnel ==
- Christopher "Khrysis" Tyson — vocals, producer, recording, mixing, mastering, executive producer
- Sean "MC Sean Boog" Evans — vocals, executive producer
- DJ Flash — scratches (track 5)
- Lorenzo "Zo!" Ferguson — piano (track 17)
- Patrick "9th Wonder" Douthit — executive producer
- Drew "Dru-Ha" Friedman — associate executive producer
- Kenyatta "Buckshot" Blake — associate executive producer
- Warren Hendricks Jr. — artwork, design
- Sam Skrilla — additional artwork
- Noah Friedman — project coordinator
- 7545 Photography — photography
