= The Solution (Buckshot and 9th Wonder album) =

Studio album by 9th Wonder & Buckshot
- Released: November 13, 2012
- Recorded: 2010–2012
- Genre: Hip-hop
- Length: 41:41
- Label: Duck Down
- Producer: 9th Wonder (also exec.)

9th Wonder & Buckshot chronology
The Formula (2008)	The Solution (2012)

The Solution is the third collaborative studio album by American rapper Buckshot and record producer 9th Wonder. It was released on November 13, 2012 through Jamla Records/Duck Down Music. Production was entirely handled by 9th Wonder, who also served as executive producer. It features guest appearances from Dyme-A-Duzin and Rapsody. The album debuted at number 196 on the Billboard 200 chart, with first-week sales of 2,300 copies in the United States.

A music video for the album's lead single "The Change Up" was directed by Kenneth Price. Another video was released for the song "Shorty Left".

== Critical reception ==
Professional ratings
Aggregate scores
Source	Rating
Metacritic	73/100
Review scores
Source	Rating
AllMusic	3.5/5 stars
Consequence of Sound	C−
Exclaim!	7/10
HipHopDX	3.5/5
RapReviews	7/10
XXL	XL (4/5)

The Solution was met with generally favorable reviews. At Metacritic, which assigns a normalized rating out of 100 to reviews from mainstream publications, the album received an average score of 73, based on seven reviews.

Bogar Alonso of XXL stated, "The Solution finds Buckshot doing a better job than in his past two at-bats to keep up with the super producer, and he does so by using his relaxed spitting as an anchor". AllMusic's David Jeffries said, "The nostalgia and artistry will take you back and warm your Coogi-covered heart". Ryan B. Patrick of Exclaim! said, "It's a gritty, soulful sound that holds The Solution together, seemingly aspiring to be nothing more than "Boot Camp meets Little Brother": familiar and stress-free for an audience seeking a vintage feel in their hip-hop". Jesse Fairfax of HipHopDX said, "The Solution once again combines Buckshot and 9th Wonder's accomplished and refined skill sets as pioneers of the '90s and the past decade respectively". Grant Jones of RapReviews said, "The Solution doesn't differ from the previous instalments at all. If you're a fan of either artist then it is certainly worth picking up". Jon Hadusek of Consequence of Sound said, "Although The Solution is too hung up on the past to be relevant in the present, it remains a competent throwback to hip-hop's golden age, an era that both artists seem to be yearning for. That nostalgia pervades The Solution".

== Track listing ==
All tracks produced by Patrick "9th Wonder" Douthit.

All tracks are written by Kenyatta Blake & Patrick Douthit except where noted.

No.	Title	Writer(s)	Length
1.	"The Big Bang"		3:51
2.	"What I Gotta Say"		3:49
3.	"Stop Rapping"		3:40
4.	"Crazy"		3:02
5.	"The Feeling"		3:48
6.	"Sam"		2:53
7.	"Pat Em Down"		3:51
8.	"Keep It Going"		2:44
9.	"The Change Up"		2:41
10.	"Shorty Left" (featuring Rapsody)	Blake; Marlanna Evans; Douthit	3:13
11.	"You" (featuring Dyme-A-Duzin)	Blake; Donnovan Blocker; Douthit	3:37
12.	"The Solution"		4:32
Total length:			41:41

Sample Credits

- "The Big Bang"
  - "Come Fly Away with Me" by Magnum Force
- "What I Gotta Say"
  - "New Directions" by The Foundations
- "Crazy"
  - "I Don’t See Me...Anymore" by Glass House
- "The Feeling"
  - "Let the Feeling Talk to You" by The Dells
- "Sam"
  - "Where Do We Go from Here / Journey" by Enchantment
- "Pat Em Down"
  - "Tear Down The Walls" by Lamont Dozier
- "Keep It Going"
  - "Break Down for Love" by Tavares
- "The Change Up"
  - "Love is Just a Dream" by Cliff Dawson
- "Shorty Left"
  - "All I Need is Time" by First Choice
- "You"
  - "I Don’t Know" by The Controllers
- "The Solution"
  - "Which One Should I Choose" by The Unifics

== Personnel ==
- Kenyatta "Buckshot" Blake – main artist, associate executive producer
- Patrick "9th Wonder" Douthit – main artist, producer, executive producer
- Marlanna "Rapsody" Evans – vocals (track 10)
- Donnovan "Dyme-A-Duzin" Blocker – vocals (track 11)
- "Dan The Man" Humiston – mixing
- Isaac Romero – mastering
- Drew "Dru-Ha" Friedman – associate executive producer
- Jacqueline Shao – artwork
- Robert Adam Mayer – photography

== Charts ==
Chart (2012)	Peak position
US Current Album Sales (Billboard)	141
US Top R&B/Hip-Hop Albums (Billboard)	28
US Top Rap Albums (Billboard)	19
