= Chaundon =

American rapper

Finian C. St. Omer II (born September 6, 1976), better known by Chaundon, is an American hip-hop artist from South Bronx, New York City. In 2008, he released his debut album Carnage and has become well known on the internet due to his website (theweightwontloseitself.com), independent music show (The IMO Show), and internet blog show Nignorance. Chaundon released his second album, No Excuses, on October 26, 2010.

== Biography ==
Growing up in the South Bronx, constantly surrounded by hip-hop, Chaundon began writing rhymes at the age of 13. As he attended Adlai E. Stevenson High School, his first performances were rapping in front of other students in the cafeteria and hallways. After transferring from Barber-Scotia College in Concord, North Carolina to North Carolina Central University in Durham in 1999, he came into contact with members of Little Brother, and became a central figure in establishing the reputation of the Justus League.

He also appeared on L.E.G.A.C.Y.'s Project Mayhem, The Away Team's National Anthem, Little Brother's The Chittlin' Circuit, The Chitlin Circuit 1.5, The Minstrel Show, DJ Drama Separate but Equal, their latest mixtape with DJ Mick Boogie, And Justus for All, the Hall of Justus'compilation Soldiers of Fortune, Darien Brockington's Somebody to Love, Median's Median's Relief, Cesar Comanche's Squirrel and the Aces Sean Price's Jesus Price Supastar, 9th Wonder's The Dream Merchant Vol. 2 and Torae's Daily Conversation.

In 2008, he released his debut album, Carnage. The album included guest appearances from several other rappers, including Little Brother, 9th Wonder, Jean Grae, and Sean Price. He also released the Black Dynamite LP.

== Discography ==
=== Albums ===
- Carnage (2008, Defend)
- No Excuses (2010, Hall of Justus, itunes.apple.com)
- The Jammington (2012, Golden Era Music Inc.)

=== Mixtapes ===
- "Slow Leaks" (2003)
- "Live from the 718" (2004, bandcamp.com)
- "Venom" (2007, bandcamp.com)
- "Ambitions of a Writer" (2007, bandcamp.com)
- "Black Dynamite" (2009, bandcamp.com)
- "Black Dynamite's Revenge" (2009, bandcamp.com)
- "Baby Making Music" (2010, bandcamp.com)
