= Desi Relaford =

American baseball player (born 1973)

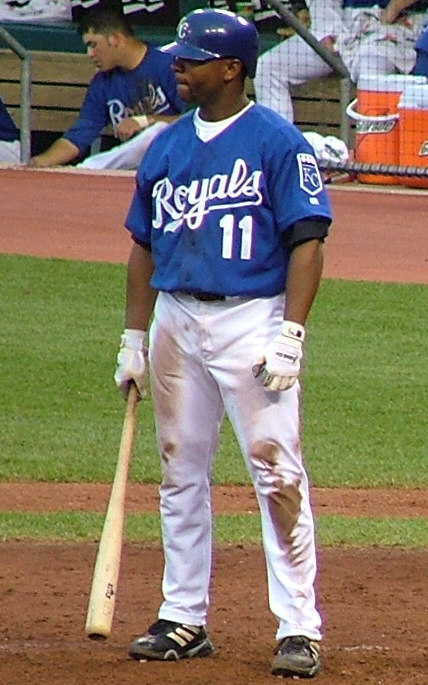
- Relaford with the Kansas City Royals in 2004
- Infielder
- Born: September 16, 1973 (age 53); Valdosta, Georgia, U.S.
- Batted: Switch Threw: Right

MLB debut
- August 1, 1996, for the Philadelphia Phillies

Last MLB appearance
- July 28, 2007, for the Texas Rangers

MLB statistics
- Batting average: .243
- Home runs: 40
- Runs batted in: 308
- Stats at Baseball Reference

Teams
- Philadelphia Phillies (1996–2000); San Diego Padres (2000); New York Mets (2001); Seattle Mariners (2002); Kansas City Royals (2003–2004); Colorado Rockies (2005); Texas Rangers (2007)

Desmond Lamont "Desi" Relaford (born September 16, 1973) is an American former professional baseball infielder. He played in Major League Baseball for the Texas Rangers, Colorado Rockies, Kansas City Royals, Seattle Mariners, New York Mets, San Diego Padres and Philadelphia Phillies.

== Career ==
Known more for his defense than his bat, his versatility was his trademark. Over the course of an 11-year major league career, he played every position in the field except first base and catcher; he pitched in one game for the New York Mets in which he recorded a perfect inning with a strikeout and threw over 90 mph.

Relaford was traded twice during the 2001-2002 offseason, once with Tsuyoshi Shinjo to the San Francisco Giants for Shawn Estes and again to the Seattle Mariners for David Bell.

Relaford signed a minor league deal with the Rangers on February 14, 2007. He competed with Jerry Hairston Jr., Drew Meyer, and Joaquin Arias for a spot as utility infielder during spring training, but wound up starting the season in the minors. In early July, Relaford was called up to the Rangers after regular second baseman Ian Kinsler was placed on the disabled list after suffering a stress fracture. Relaford was released after the season, and never played professionally after that.

On March 23, 2021, Relaford was named the manager for the Danville Otterbots of the new Appalachian League.

== Life beyond baseball ==
Relaford currently has a home in Jacksonville, Florida with his wife, Cassandra Sapphire Daley, whom he married in 2002. They have two children. Relaford is the founder of 6 Hole Records, a hip-hop record label based in Jacksonville.

Relaford is a graduate of Sandalwood High School.

Relaford's nephew, Cole Tabb is a college football running back for the Cincinnati Bearcats.
