= L.E.G.A.C.Y. =

American rapper

Kehinde LaVar Harper, better known by his stage name L.E.G.A.C.Y. is an American rapper from Fort Bragg, North Carolina, and former member of the Justus League collective.

== Biography ==
L.E.G.A.C.Y. is an acronym for Life Ends Gradually and Changes You. He was born on the military base Fort Bragg, and grew up in Fayetteville, before moving to Goldsboro, North Carolina. His often dark lyrics are informed by his earlier experiences in life, and he cites Rakim and Big L as influences, as well as rock musicians Jim Morrison and Kurt Cobain. He joined the Justus League collective in 2001, having previously worked with its chief producer, 9th Wonder, booking reservations at a Holiday Inn, neither knowing that the other was a rap musician at the time. Early collaborations with 9th Wonder appeared on the 2003 self-financed Legsclusives release. L.E.G.A.C.Y.'s debut album proper, Project Mayhem was released in 2005 odfn 6 Hole Records, including references to and samples from the film Fight Club. The album was produced by 9th Wonder and Khrysis, and features guest appearances from Phonte from Little Brother, Chaundon, Median, Joe Scudda, Percy Miracles, and Keisha Shontell. The album was positively received, with Exclaim! calling the lyrics "raw and razor sharp". Project Mayhem was included in the three-disc box set National Mayhem in 2005. L.E.G.A.C.Y. has also contributed to several Justus League-related compilations, including the Soldiers of Fortune album. His collaboration with LUNATIC The Messiah, "No Regrets", was picked out by Independent Weekly as one of the forty best songs from local artists of 2008. He relocated to Baltimore in 2007, breaking away from the Justus League. His latest album, Suicide Music, was released in June 2009. The album was produced by Khrysis.

== Discography ==
=== Albums ===
- Project Mayhem (2005 - 6 Hole)
- Suicide Music (2009 - Hall of Justus)

=== Mixtapes ===
- Legsclusives (2003)
- Whut? Thee Mixtape: Chapter I (2006 - hosted by DJ Parydime)
- The NC Chainsaw Massacre (2009 - hosted by DJ Flash)
- Hopscotch Killer (2011)

=== Singles ===
- "Nice" (2003 - Hall of Justus)
- "I'm a Star" (2005 - 6 Hole)
- "Bang" (2007)
- "The Greatest" (2009)
