= The Away Team (group) =

American hip hop group

- Origin: North Carolina, United States
- Genres: Alternative hip hop
- Years active: 2001–present
- Labels: 6 Hole; Hall of Justus; It's a Wonderful World; Duck Down
- Members: Khrysis; Sean Boog

The Away Team is a hip hop duo consisting of MC Sean Boog and producer Khrysis, both of whom are members of the North Carolina rap collective the Justus League.

== History ==
Boog and Khrysis were introduced to each other in 2001 by Little Brother's 9th Wonder, and became members of the Justus League collective as well as working together as the Away Team. Boog had previously contributed to the Foreign Exchange’s debut album, Connected and the Justus League mixtape NC State of Mind, while Khrysis had undertaken production work for Jean Grae, Big Pooh, and Masta Ace. Their debut album, The National Anthem, was released in May 2005 on 6 Hole Records, and featured guest appearances from Joe Scudda, Chaundon, Smif-n-Wessun, and Little Brother's Big Pooh and Phonte. It was described by Alarm magazine as "a combination of consistent rhymes and better than stellar production". Second album Training Day was released in 2007 on the Hall of Justus label, featuring contributions from unofficial third member Nervous Reck, Evidence (of Dilated Peoples), Sean Price, Black Milk, Supastition and Darien Brockington. The duo also contributed two tracks to the Hall of Justus album Soldiers of Fortune.

== Discography ==
- National Anthem (2005) – 6 Hole
- Training Day (2007) – Hall of Justus
- The Warm Up (2009) – Hall of Justus
- Independence Day (2010) – IWWMG/The Academy
- Scars & Stripes (2011) – IWWMG/Jamla/Duck Down
- Grand Gesture (2013) – Jamla
