= Justus League =

American hip hop group

- Origin: Raleigh, North Carolina
- Years active: 1999–2019
- Labels: Defenders of the Free World (D.O.T.F.W.), 6 Hole, Hall of Justus
- Past members: L.E.G.A.C.Y. The Away Team; 9th Wonder; Phonte; Rapper Big Pooh; Little Brother; Edgar Allen Floe; Median; Chaundon; Cesar Comanche; DJ Flash Gordon; Mike Burvick; Son of Yorel; Eccentric; Big Dho

The Justus League was a hip hop collective from North Carolina founded in 1999. The collective consists of a total of 15 members (8 emcees, 5 producers, 1 DJ, and 1 consultant a.k.a. "Minister of Opinion". The emcees are: Cesar Comanche, Chaundon, Phonte, Rapper Big Pooh, Median, L.E.G.A.C.Y., Sean Boog, and Edgar Allen Floe. The producers are: 9th Wonder, Khrysis, Son of Yorel, Eccentric, and Big Dho. The DJ is DJ Flash Gordon, and the Consultant/Minister of Opinion is Mike Burvick. Although material isn't released as a collective, each member works actively in the music scene releasing solo albums, running their own record labels, along with other business endeavors.

Affiliated acts include Skyzoo, Joe Scudda, Nicolay (of Grammy-nominated group The Foreign Exchange), Darien Brockington, among others.

Cesar Comanche and 9th Wonder first met in 1996 and with Big Dho, they founded the collective in 1999 after meeting other artists at NC Central University and NC State University such as Phonte, Edgar Allen Floe, Son of Yorel, and Median.

Little Brother's former manager, Big Dho, founded the Hall of Justus music group in 2003, which provides an outlet for the artists in the collective. Releases by the collective have been released under the Hall of Justus name, including the Soldiers of Fortune compilation in 2006.

The group signed to a four-album deal on 6 Hole Records, owned by Desi Relaford (of the Kansas City Royals) in 2004.

The collective seems to have splintered, as internal conflicts have led to the breakup of groups (for example, Little Brother) and general dissent within the Justus League. Also individual members have stated that the time of this collective has passed and that they have moved on, according to Chaundon in an online interview. A fair number of group members are still active, but some seemed to either have left the collective, or are pursuing separate musical endeavors.

Brooklyn rapper Skyzoo contributed to three tracks on the Hall of Justus album Soldiers of Fortune.

== Discography ==
=== Albums by Justus League ===
- NC State of Mind (2003) (2 CD set mixtape in collaboration with hiphopsite.com)
- National Mayhem (2005) 6 Hole (3CD Box set)
- Soldiers of Fortune (2006) ABB
