= Khrysis =

American rapper (born 1981)

- Born: Christopher Frederick Tyson; September 7, 1981 (age 44); New Jersey, U.S.
- Origin: Durham, North Carolina, U.S.
- Genres: Hip hop; soul; R&B
- Occupations: Record producer; recording engineer; mixing engineer; rapper; songwriter
- Years active: 2003–present
- Labels: It's a Wonderful World; Boardroom Music; EMPIRE; 6 Hole; Duck Down
- Member of: The Away Team; The Soul Council; Jericho Jackson
- Formerly of: Justus League

Christopher Frederick Tyson (born September 7, 1981), better known as Khrysis, is an American hip hop producer and occasional rapper. He is best known as a former member of the Justus League collective, being one half of the duo The Away Team with Sean Boog. He also operates as an in-house producer for The Soul Council, 9th Wonder's producer collective, and acts as one half of the duo Jericho Jackson with Elzhi.

Khrysis' productions consist of samples of records with intricate melodies and diverse drum beats. He began in his teens, recording tracks from his father's massive jazz and R&B record collection onto tape, and then extracting drum samples to make loops using a dual cassette player. He met rapper Chaundon at NC Central University, who introduced him to 9th Wonder. Later, he began an association with The Justus League. With fellow League member Sean Boog, he formed The Away Team, releasing their debut album National Anthem in May 2005, and the follow-up Training Day, in 2007. The two artists would continue to release music as a group until 2011's Scars & Stripes.

Khrysis was also one of the main in-house producers for the North Carolina rap collective Justus League, alongside 9th Wonder. During his time in the collective, he was also producing for external artists such as Sean Price, Masta Ace and Jean Grae. After the collective disbanded, Khrysis would go on to be an in-house producer for 9th Wonder's Jamla label, being a member of the label's Soul Council production team and producing for Jamla artists such as Rapsody, Heather Victoria, GQ and Reuben Vincent. He would also continue producing outside of the Jamla label, for artists including Smif-N-Wessun, Conway the Machine, Murs and Black Thought. He would also collaborate with rapper Elzhi, forming the group Jericho Jackson and releasing their self-titled debut.

In 2007, Khrysis was chosen by Nike to create the soundtrack to the documentary LACED, celebrating 30 years of Nike's association with basketball.

After a number of instrumental albums and collaborative projects, Khrysis released his debut album The Hour of Khrysis on April 20, 2021. The album featured guest appearances from De La Soul, Busta Rhymes, Pharoahe Monch, Chi-Ali, Evidence and Del the Funky Homosapien.

== Discography ==
=== Albums ===
- 2021: The Hour of Khrysis

=== Instrumental albums ===
- 2012: Funkwhatchuheard
- 2015: On the Boards Vol. 1
- 2016: MotherfuNker
- 2021: On the Boards Vol. 2
- 2023: Follow the Music

=== Collaborative albums ===
- 2013: Between Heaven and Hell (with Add-2)
- 2018: Elzhi & Khrysis are Jericho Jackson (with Elzhi as Jericho Jackson)
- 2022: Pure Izm (with The Musalini)
- 2023: Destined 4 Greatness (with KEL)
- 2024: Perfect Time (with Silent Snipers)
- 2024: Hocaine (with Wais P)
- 2025: The Green Bottle (with T.F)

=== EPs ===
- 2013: Merry Khrysmas

=== Compilations ===
- 2007: Khrysis on the Boards with the Heat Vol. 1
- 2008: Khrysis on the Boards with the Heat Vol. 2
