= Sy Smith discography =

- Studio albums: 5
- Extended plays: 2
- Soundtrack albums: 10
- Compilation albums: 2
- Singles: 8
- Video albums: 2
- Music videos: 16

The discography of Sy Smith, an American R&B singer, consists of four studio albums, two compilation albums, eight singles and one video album.

Smith released her first studio album Psykosoul in 2000, which spawned the singles "Gladly" and "Good N Strong". Following the release of her first album, Smith left Hollywood. In early 2005, she began her own recording label known as Psyko! Inc. In September 2005, Smith released her second album The Syberspace Social, which spawned the single "Fa'Sho". Smith released her concert DVD Sy Smith Live: Worship At The Temple, in 2007. In 2008, Smith released her third studio album, Conflict, with the lead single "Fly Away With Me". The single charted at #38 on the Top 40 Hot Adult R&B Chart. In 2010, Smith released a single "Truth", followed by her best-of album Syberselects: A Collection of Sy Smith Favorites. In March 2012, Smith released her fourth studio album Fast and Curious.

== Albums ==
=== Studio albums ===
| Year | Album |
|---|---|
| 2000 | Psykosoul: Released: April 4, 2000; Labels: Hollywood Records; Formats: CD, digital download |
| 2005 | The Syberspace Social: Released: September 5, 2005; Labels: Kajmere, Psyko!; Formats: CD, digital download |
| 2008 | Conflict: Released: April 1, 2008; Labels: Psyko!/MDI; Formats: CD, digital download |
| 2012 | Fast and Curious: Released: March 6, 2012; Labels: Psyko!/MDI; Formats: CD, digital download |
| 2018 | Sometimes a Rose Will Grow in Concrete: Released: February 16, 2018; Labels: Psyko!; Formats: CD, vinyl, digital download |
| 2024 | Until We Meet Again: Released: January 26, 2024; Labels: FE Music |

=== Compilations ===
| Year | Album details | Notes |
|---|---|---|
| 2005 | Psykosoul Plus: Released: December 7, 2005; Label: Psyko!; Formats: CD, digital download | A re-mastered edition featuring three additional songs. |
| 2010 | SyberSelects: A Collection of Sy Smith Favorites: Released: October 26, 2010; Label: Psyko!; Formats: CD, digital download | Features the past singles and songs of the previous albums: Psykosoul, The Syberspace Social, and Conflict. |

== EPs ==
- Selections from Psykosoul (Hollywood, 1999)
- One Like Me (Psyko!, 2002)
- The Syberspace Social Vinyl EP (Psyko!, 2007)
- Sometimes A Rose Will Get A Remix (Psyko!, 2019)

== Singles ==
| Year | Title | Chart positions | | Album |
| Year | Title | U.S. R&B | Hot Adult R&B | Album |
|---|---|---|---|---|
| 1999 | "Gladly" | 79 | — | Psykosoul |
| 2000 | "Good N Strong" | — | — | Psykosoul |
| 2005 | "Fa'Sho" | — | — | The Syberspace Social |
| 2008 | "Fly Away With Me" | — | 38 | Conflict |
| 2010 | "Truth" | — | — | Fast and Curious |
| 2011 | "Teena (Lovergirl Syberized)" | — | — | Fast and Curious |
| 2012 | "Nights (Feel Like Getting Down)" | — | — | Fast and Curious |
| 2015 | "When I Think of You" | — | — | (Non-album single) |
| 2018 | "Now and Later" | — | — | Sometimes a Rose Will Grow in Concrete |
| 2018 | "Perspective" | — | — | Sometimes a Rose Will Grow in Concrete |
| 2018 | "Camelot" | — | — | Sometimes a Rose Will Grow in Concrete |
| 2020 | "Feeling Good" (feat. DominiqueXavier) | — | — | (Non-album single) |
| 2023 | "Slide" | — | — | Until We Meet Again |
"—" denotes items which were not released in that country or failed to chart.

=== Featured singles ===
| Year | Title | Album |
|---|---|---|
| 2012 | "Get Love" (3kOHM featuring Sy Smith) | Non-album singles |
| 2012 | "I'm Glad That You're Gone" (Louis Benedetti & Sy Smith) | Non-album singles |
| 2014 | "#1" (Printz Board featuring Sy Smith) | Pre-Games |

== Other appearances ==
=== Soundtracks appearances ===
| Year | Title | Soundtrack |
|---|---|---|
| 2000 | "Good and Strong" | High Fidelity |
| 2000 | "Welcome Back (All My Soulmates)" | Dancing in September |
| 2001 | "Heaven Is" | All About You |
| 2002 | "Lover's Crime" | Deliver Us from Eva |
| 2004 | "Do You Only Want to Dance" | Dirty Dancing: Havana Nights |
| 2006 | "Bounce Like My Checks" | Saints Row |
| 2006 | "DFM Like I'm Your Wife" | Saints Row |
| 2006 | "Leave the Ho" | Saints Row |
| 2008 | "Spies" | Noah's Arc: Jumping the Broom |
| 2011 | "The Fast & The Curious" | Few Options |

=== Album appearances ===
| Year | Title | Album |
|---|---|---|
| 2003 | "Paarty" (The Brand New Heavies featuring Sy Smith) | We Won't Stop |
| 2003 | "Don't Call Me Foolish" (The Brand New Heavies featuring Sy Smith, Bucwhead, and Jan) | We Won't Stop |
| 2003 | "Respect" (The Brand New Heavies featuring Sy Smith) | We Won't Stop |
| 2003 | "We Won't Stop" (The Brand New Heavies featuring Sy Smith) | We Won't Stop |
| 2003 | "Love Is..." (The Brand New Heavies featuring Sy Smith and Jan) | We Won't Stop |
| 2003 | "Music" (The Brand New Heavies featuring Sy Smith) | We Won't Stop |
| 2003 | "Rise" (The Brand New Heavies featuring Sy Smith) | We Won't Stop |
| 2004 | "Define Our Love (They Can't)" (Ali Shaheed featuring Sy Smith) | Shaheedullah and Stereotypes |
| 2004 | "Put Me On"(Ali Shaheed featuring Sy Smith and Stokley Williams) | Shaheedullah and Stereotypes |
| 2004 | "I Declare" (Ali Shaheed featuring Sy Smith) | Shaheedullah and Stereotypes |
| 2004 | "Honey Child" (Ali Shaheed featuring Sy Smith and Stokley Williams) | Shaheedullah and Stereotypes |
| 2004 | "Family" (Ali Shaheed featuring Sy Smith, Kay, and Chalmers Spanky Alford) | Shaheedullah and Stereotypes |
| 2004 | "Elevate Orange" (Sy Smith featuring M. Jones, Michael Jones, Bashiri Johnson) | Shaheedullah and Stereotypes |
| 2004 | "All Night" (Ali Shaheed featuring Sy Smith, Wallace Gary, Michael Jones, Chalmers Spanky Alford) | Shaheedullah and Stereotypes |
| 2004 | "Neva Satisfied" (Toshi featuring Sy Smith) | Time to Share |
| 2005 | "Can't Hold Back" (Rich Medina featuring Sy Smith) | Connecting the Dots |
| 2006 | "That Sound" (Brinsley Evans featuring Sy Smith) | That Sound |
| 2006 | "My Story" (Nicolay featuring Sy Smith) | Here |
| 2006 | "Superfriends" (Airpushers featuring Sy Smith) | Themes for the Ordinarily Strange |
| 2006 | "Fill In The Blanks" (Airpushers featuring Sy Smith) | Themes for the Ordinarily Strange |
| 2007 | "So Many Ways" (Golden featuring Sy Smith) | Peddling Medicine |
| 2008 | "Relief" (Me'Shell Ndegeocello featuring Sy Smith) | The World Has Made the Man of My Dreams |
| 2008 | "Elliptical" (Me'Shell Ndegeocello featuring Sy Smith) | The World Has Made the Man of My Dreams |
| 2008 | "A Different Girl (Every Night)" (Me'Shell Ndegeocello featuring Sy Smith) | The World Has Made the Man of My Dreams |
| 2008 | "Overthought" (Dre King featuring Sy Smith and Bilal Salaam) | Kingdom Come |
| 2008 | "Conflict" (Dre King featuring Sy Smith) | Kingdom Come |
| 2008 | "3 Sides" (Crossrhodes featuring Sy Smith) | The Invitation |
| 2008 | "That Sound (Jah Sound Mix)" (Jah Sound featuring Sy Smith and Brinsley Evans) | The Jah Sound EP |
| 2008 | "Conflict" | Amplified Present Dirty Soul Electric |
| 2009 | "Celebrate" (Eric Roberson featuring Sy Smith) | Music Fan First |
| 2009 | "The Look of Love" (Chris Botti featuring Sy Smith) | Chris Botti in Boston |
| 2009 | "The Art of You" | Tokyo Rush |
| 2009 | "Crazy You" (Zo! featuring Sy Smith) | just visiting too |
| 2010 | "I Came to See" (Geno Young featuring Sy Smith) | Ear Hustler |
| 2010 | "Greatest Weapon of All Time" (Zo! featuring Sy Smith) | Sunstorm |
| 2010 | "Tell A Vision" (Wes Felton featuring Sy Smith) | Land of Sheep, Ran by Pigs, Ruled by Wolves |
| 2010 | "That Sound" (with Brinsley Evans) | Remixxer: Bill Coleman (Continuous Mix with Bonus Tracks) |
| 2011 | "Black Cow" (Zo! featuring Sy Smith & Phonte) | ...just visiting three |
| 2011 | "Driving" (Zo! featuring Sy Smith) | ...just visiting three |
| 2011 | "Nothing Without" (The E. Family featuring Sy Smith) | Now and Forever |
| 2012 | "Inside My Love" (The Decorders featuring Sy Smith) | Inside My Love - single |
| 2012 | "Nothing Left to Say" (3 Brave Souls, John Beasley, Darryl Jones & Ndugu Chancler featuring Sy Smith) | 3 Brave Souls |
| 2012 | "Wanna Get Away" (3 Brave Souls, John Beasley, Darryl Jones & Ndugu Chancler featuring Sy Smith) | 3 Brave Souls |
| 2012 | "Love's Graces" (3 Brave Souls, John Beasley, Darryl Jones & Ndugu Chancler featuring Sy Smith) | 3 Brave Souls |
| 2013 | "The Train" (Zo! featuring Sy Smith) | ManMade |
| 2013 | "For Tina" (Zo! featuring Sy Smith) | ManMade |
| 2013 | "Body Rock" (Zo! featuring Sy Smith) | ManMade |
| 2014 | "#1" (Printz Board featuring Sy Smith) | Pre-Games |

== Videography ==
=== Music videos ===
| Year | Title | Director(s) |
|---|---|---|
| 1999 | "Gladly" | Rashidi Natara Harper |
| 2001 | "Heard It All Before" (by Sunshine Anderson) | Nzingha Stewart |
| 2005 | "Fa'Sho" | Mike Quain |
| 2007 | "Reach Down In Your Soul" | W. Ellington Felton |
| 2008 | "Fly Away With Me" | Shawn Carter Peterson |
| 2008 | "Conflict" | Shawn Carter Peterson |
| 2009 | "Spies" | Shawn Carter Peterson |
| 2009 | "B-Side Love Affair" | Phetogo Tshepo Mahasha |
| 2009 | "The Art of You" | Shawn Carter Peterson |
| 2010 | "Truth" | Shawn Carter Peterson |
| 2012 | "Nights (Feel Like Gettin' Down)" | Shawn Carter Peterson |
| 2014 | "#1" (by Printz Board featuring Sy Smith) | n/a |
| 2019 | "Now and Later" | Shawn Carter Peterson |
| 2020 | "Camelot" | Shawn Carter Peterson |
| 2020 | "Sometimes A Rose Will Grow In Concrete" | Shawn Carter Peterson |
| 2020 | "Perfect Love" (Rachel Eckroth feat. Sy Smith) | Tatch Taboada |

=== Video Releases ===
- Sy Smith Live: Worship At The Temple (2007)
