= The Travels of Windimoto =

The Travels Of Windimoto

EP by Windimoto
- Released: 13 November 2007
- Recorded: Spring 2007
- Genre: Dance
- Length: 59:12
- Label: Interdependent Media
- Producer: Windimoto, Nicolay, Sevany2, Trackademics, DJ Tony Tone

Windimoto chronology
The Travels Of Windimoto (2007)	Sinister Beauty (2009)

Singles from The Travels Of Windimoto
- 1. "Don't Let Me Leave Alone/A Place For Us" Released: Fall 2007

The Travels Of Windimoto is the debut EP by American dance music production duo Windimoto.

== Background information ==
The very first Windimoto session was a trial session to see if members Sean Haley and Scorpeze could work together creatively. The first session yielded "Midnight In Eden". After that session, Windimoto was formed. The duo continued to record demos in order to feel each other out and devise a working formula.

The second Windimoto jam session yielded the basic instrumental track for "Don't Let Me Leave Alone". Plans were to refine the track and release it as an instrumental until Scorpeze played it for emcee/singer Phonte Coleman (Little Brother, The Foreign Exchange), who is a fan of house music. Coleman asked if he could put vocals on the track and the duo agreed. It was decided that Coleman would use an alias so that the song would stand or fall on its own merits. Coleman chose the alias Victor St. Clair. Coleman and newcomer Carlitta Durand also contributed vocals to "A Place For Us". The secret was revealed by a journalist in their review of the EP.

In a very short time after the track was completed, Bay Area hip-hop label, Interdependent Media, showed interest in releasing the song. A deal was made with Interdependent Media for a single release to be followed by a remix EP.

Remixes were done by Detroit producers Sevany2 (also known as tREBLEFREE) and DJ Tony Tone, Bay Area producer/remixer Trackademicks, and Dutch producer/musician Nicolay (Coleman's partner in the duo The Foreign Exchange). The stylistic variety of the remixes were intended to attract listeners who may not be familiar with dance music. The other three original tracks ("A Place For Us", "Underground Peace Lounge", "Afra Natura") were recorded in quick succession after the duo was formed. With the exception of "Afra Natura", these songs were considered demos and intended to be fleshed out later. Due to the very short period of time between Windimoto's inception and the deadline for the EP to be turned in, the duo decided to include the songs in their raw state on the EP.

Originally planned to be released in Summer 2007, the EP was pushed back until Winter 2007 when it was finally released digitally on November 13. The duo intended for the EP to have only 8 tracks with "Afra Natura" as the closing track, and the DJ Tony Tone and Trackademicks remixes as a bonus tracks on the digital release only. The duo did not wish to flood the CD with too many remixes of the same two songs. For reasons unknown, the EP was pressed as 10 tracks with the bonus tracks included. A 12" single was issued for "Don't Let Me Leave Alone"—with "A Place For Us" on the b-side—slightly ahead of the release of the EP. The Nicolay and Trackademicks remixes were included on the 12" along with the original version. There has not been a physical release of the EP to date.

In 2009, Phuture Soul Recordings released a remix single of "Don't Let Me Leave Alone" featuring remixes by Pirahanahead, Ian Friday, and Abicah Soul.

== Reception ==
Professional ratings
Review scores
Source	Rating
URB	4/5 stars
PopMatters	7/10 stars
Okayplayer	(favorable)

Upon release of the EP, reviews from the music press were mostly very positive. The EP was praised by critics for its genre-bending and fresh sound. PopMatters critic Dan Nishimoto wrote that the EP "is an encouraging first excursion that begs repeated exploration" and awarded it 7 out of 10 stars. Properly Chilled critic Jamie Hailstone commented, "You’ve got minimal house beats, soulful vocals, bags of funk and good tunes. House never sounded so good." URB Magazine critic Conan Milne rated it 4 out of 5 stars and remarked, "The Travels Of Windimoto is a pretty rare album--one that does the term ‘genre-bending’ a bit of justice. URB Magazine went on to allow the duo to host their own podcast on the URB Magazine website. The Travels Of Windimoto was named #44 in Vapors Magazine's Top 50 Albums of 2008.

== Track listing ==
All tracks written by Sean Haley and Scorpeze; except where indicated.

1. "Don't Let Me Leave Alone (Talia)" (Haley, Scorpeze, St. Clair) – 6:39
2. "A Place For Us" (Haley, Scorpeze, St. Clair, Durand) – 5:17
3. "Midnight In Eden" – 6:10
4. "Underground Peace Lounge" – 5:05
5. "A Place For Us" (The Sevany2 Rent Party Redux)
6. "Don't Let Me Leave Alone" (Nicolay's Hardhouse Remix) – 5:10
7. "Don't Let Me Leave Alone" (The Sevany2 Step Remix) – 7:53
8. "Afra Natura" – 5:10
9. "Don't Let Me Leave Alone" (Trackademicks Remix) – 5:10
10. "A Place For Us" (DJ Tony Tone Remix) – 5:57
