= Here (Nicolay album) =

Studio album by Nicolay
- Released: 1 September 2006
- Genre: Hip hop
- Length: 42:44
- Label: BBE
- Producer: Nicolay

Nicolay chronology
City Lights Vol. 1.5 (2005)	Here (2006)	City Lights Vol. 2: Shibuya (2009)

Professional ratings
Review scores
Source	Rating
AllMusic	3/5 stars
The A.V. Club	A−
Exclaim!	favorable
Pitchfork Media	4.4/10
PopMatters	7/10 stars

Here is a studio album by Dutch record producer Nicolay, one half of the duo The Foreign Exchange. It was released on BBE in 2006. It features guest appearances from Darien Brockington, Black Spade, Wiz Khalifa, Yahzarah, Kay, and Sy Smith.

== Reception ==
Nathan Rabin of The A.V. Club gave Here a grade of A−, saying: "While even the most distinctive producers can lose their footing when turning over beats to an album's worth of guests, Nicolay's strong sonic personality gives the album a surprising level of cohesion and continuity."

Meanwhile, Marisa Brown of AllMusic gave the album 3 stars out of 5 and said, "[Here] isn't a bad album, it's just becomes pretty formulaic, and when the formula's not that exciting to begin with, well, it leaves you wanting something more, something that will probably never come."

== Track listing ==
No.	Title	Length
1.	"Here (Intro)"	1:58
2.	"I Love the Way You Love" (featuring Darien Brockington)	3:06
3.	"I Am the Man" (featuring Black Spade)	4:31
4.	"Give Her Everything"	3:47
5.	"What It Used to Be" (featuring Wiz Khalifa)	4:03
6.	"Good Days Are Gone" (featuring Black Spade)	4:01
7.	"Let It Shine for Me"	1:46
8.	"The End Is Near" (featuring Black Spade)	3:57
9.	"Adore" (featuring Yahzarah)	5:24
10.	"Here (Outro)"	1:29
11.	"My Story" (featuring Kay and Sy Smith)	8:42
