= Windimoto =

American dance music production duo

- left to right: Sean Haley, Scorpeze

Background information
- Origin: Chicago, Illinois
- Genres: House, soul, disco, techno, funk, Afro-Latin, electronica
- Years active: 2007–present
- Labels: Windimoto Music, Phuture Soul Recordings, Interdependent Media
- Members: Sean Haley, Scorpeze
- Website: http://www.windimoto.com

Windimoto is an American dance music production duo based in Chicago that consists of DJ/producer Sean Haley and musician/producer Scorpeze.

== "Don't Let Me Leave Alone" and The Travels of Windimoto (2007-2009) ==
In the winter of 2007, Bay Area hip-hop label Interdependent Media released the duo's debut EP, The Travels Of Windimoto, to critical acclaim. The EP featured five original songs and remixes by Nicolay, Trackademics, Sevany2, and DJ Tony Tone. The first single from the EP was "Don't Let Me Leave Alone" featuring vocals by emcee/singer Phonte Coleman (Little Brother, The Foreign Exchange) under the alias Victor St. Clair. Coleman's involvement was meant to be kept secret in order to let the song succeed own its own merits. The secret was revealed by a journalist in a review of the EP. The Travels Of Windimoto was named #44 in Vapors Magazine's Top 50 Albums of 2008. A remix single for "Don't Let Me Leave Alone" was released in 2009 on the Phuture Soul Recordings label featuring remixes by influential Deep House producers Pirahnahead, Abicah Soul, and Ian Friday.

== Discography ==
Albums:

- Sinister Beauty (2009, Windimoto Music)
- Beauty Within: Sinister Beauty Reimagined (2011, Windimoto Music)
- Love, Lust, Charm & Passion (2013, Windimoto Music)

EPs:

- The Travels Of Windimoto (2007, Interdependent Media)

Singles:

- "Don't Let Me Leave Alone" / "A Place For Us" (2007, Interdependent Media)
- "Don't Let me Leave Alone" - The Phuture Soul Remixes (2009, Phuture Soul Recordings)
- "Tonight, We Fly" (2011, Windimoto Music)
- "Transistor" / "Innerworld" (2013, Windimoto Music)
