= Dear Friends: An Evening with the Foreign Exchange =

Live album by The Foreign Exchange
- Released: June 28, 2011
- Recorded: February 2011; SoundPure Studios (Durham, NC)
- Genre: R&B, soul
- Length: 57:54
- Label: +FE Music
- Producer: The Foreign Exchange

The Foreign Exchange chronology
Authenticity (2010)	Dear Friends: An Evening with the Foreign Exchange (2011)	Love in Flying Colors (2013)

Dear Friends: An Evening with the Foreign Exchange is the live album of duo The Foreign Exchange, with supporting vocalists Jeanne Jolly and Sy Smith. The album was recorded in February 2011, at SoundPure Studios in Durham, NC.

== Background ==
The show was recorded February 2011 at SoundPure Studios in Durham, NC, The Foreign Exchange gave a private acoustic show for 40 randomly selected fans. The album features the full acoustic concert performed by the band's touring lineup of Zo!, Sy Smith, and Jeanne Jolly. The album also features songs from Connected, Leave It All Behind, Authenticity, and Zo!'s Sunstorm albums.

In addition to the live concert recordings, the release also features two studio tracks; "Steal Away" featuring Jeanne Jolly and "All the Kisses" featuring Amber & Paris Strother of indie soul trio KING.

== Track listing ==
1. Fight for Love
2. All Roads
3. Take Off the Blues
4. Lose Your Way (Band Introduction)
5. House of Cards
6. Greatest Weapon of All Time
7. Something in the Way She Moves
8. Laughing at Your Plans
9. Daykeeper / Daykeeper (chopped and screwed)
10. I Wanna Know
11. Steal Away (featuring Jeanne Jolly)
12. All the Kisses (featuring Amber & Paris Strother of KING)
