= Alex Grant (poet) =

American writer

- Born: 20th century Greenock, Inverclyde, Scotland
- Occupations: Poet, teacher
- Spouse: Tristi
- Writing career
- Language: English

Alex Grant is a Scottish-born American poet and instructor.

== Biography ==
=== Background ===
He was born in Greenock, Inverclyde, Scotland, and grew up in Kirkcaldy, Fife, Scotland.

=== Personal life ===
Grant resides in Chapel Hill, North Carolina, with his wife, Tristi.

== Literary career ==
Grant's work has appeared in Arts & Letters, Best New Poets 2007, Connecticut Review, The Missouri Review, The Seattle Review and Verse Daily. Grant has appeared on WUNC's The State of Things show with Frank Stasio.

== Awards and honors ==
Grant has been a six-time nominee for the Pushcart Prize, an American literary prize.

He has also received the following honors:

- Pavel Srut Poetry Fellowship, 2004 (a program of Western Michigan University; named in honor of Czech poet Pavel Srut)
- The Pablo Neruda Prize in Poetry – Honorable Mention, 2005 (named in honor of Chilean poet Pablo Neruda)
- The Randall Jarrell Prize, 2006 (named in honor of American poet Randall Jarrell)
- Kakalak Poetry Prize, 2006
- Best New Poets 2007
- Oscar Arnold Young Award, 2007

== Bibliography ==
His published poetry collections include:

- Chains & Mirrors. Carrboro, North Carolina: North Carolina Writers Network. 2006. ISBN 978-1-883-31419-4.
- The White Book. Charlotte, North Carolina: Main Street Rag Publishing Co. 2008. ISBN 978-1-599-48126-5.
- Fear of Moving Water. Nicholasville, Kentucky: Wind Publications. 2009. ISBN 978-1-936-13802-9.
- The Circus Poems. Davidson, North Carolina: Lorimer Press. 2010. ISBN 978-0-982-61713-7.
- The Poems of Wing Lei. Nicholasville, Kentucky: Wind Publications. 2012. ISBN 978-1-936-13845-6.

== See also ==
- List of Scottish writers
- List of people from North Carolina
- List of poets from the United States
