= Don Cusack in High Fidelity =

Studio album by Donwill
- Released: March 23, 2010
- Genre: Hip-hop
- Length: 59:52
- Label: Interdependent Media
- Producer: Aeon; Algorythm; A-Plus; Astronote; Brickbeats; Donwill; Keelay and Zaire; Martin Slo; Neon Collars; The Twilite Tone; Von Pea; Wale Oyejide

Donwill chronology
Suburban Sprawl (2009)	Don Cusack in High Fidelity (2010)	One Word No Space (2019)

Singles from Don Cusack in High Fidelity
- 1. "Laura's Song" Released: 2009

Professional ratings
Review scores
Source	Rating
AllMusic	3.5/5 stars
HipHopDX	3/5
MSN Music	(2-star Honorable Mention)
PopMatters	6/10
RapReviews	7/10
The A.V. Club	B+
The Boston Phoenix	3/4 stars

Don Cusack in High Fidelity is the debut solo studio album by American rapper Donwill. It was released on March 23, 2010, via Interdependent Media. Produced by Aeon, Keelay and Zaire, Algorythm, A-Plus, Astronote, Brickbeats, Martin Slo, Neon Collars, The Twilite Tone, Von Pea, Wale Oyejide and Donwill himself, it features guest appearances from Ragen Fykes, Che Grand, Peter Hadar, Bad Lucc, Ced Hughes, Harlems Cash, Jermiside, Kay, Mykestro, Nicky Guiland, Opio, Spec Boogie, Uzoy and Tanya Morgan.

== Track listing ==
No.	Title	Producer(s)	Length
1.	"The Monologue"		0:26
2.	"Laura's Song"	Astronote	4:17
3.	"Top 5 Breakups"	Brickbeats	3:41
4.	"Championship Vinyl" (performed by Tanya Morgan, Che Grand, Jermiside and Spec Boogie)	A Plus	3:50
5.	"Ian's Song" (featuring Opio)	Von Pea	3:40
6.	"Shake It Easy" (featuring Peter Hadar)	Martin Slo	3:00
7.	"Love Junkie" (featuring Harlems Cash and Peter Hadar)	Aeon	5:15
8.	"December 27th"	Donwill	3:11
9.	"Breathe" (featuring Nicky Guiland)	Neon Collars	4:11
10.	"I See You" (featuring Ragen Fykes)	Algorythm	2:56
11.	"Good" (featuring Che Grand, Ced Hughes and Ragen Fykes)	Aeon	6:31
12.	"Leading Lady"	Keelay and Zaire	4:13
13.	"Pussy Rules the World" (featuring Mykestro and Bad Lucc)	The Twilite Tone	3:52
14.	"Maybe You & I"	Wale Oyejide	2:11
15.	"Girl, Girl" (featuring Kay and Uzoy)	Aeon	3:54
16.	"Hey Baby" (performed by Ragen Fykes)	Keelay and Zaire	4:44
Total length:			59:52
