= Okayplayer =

Music community and digital media platform

- Homepage on April 25, 2026
- Website type: Online media platform
- Available in: English
- Founded: 2004; 22 years ago
- Country of origin: United States
- Owner: Condé Nast
- Creators: Ahmir "Questlove" Thompson; Angela Nissel
- Editor: Rachel Hislop
- Website: www.okayplayer.com
- Commercial: Yes
- Registration: No
- Current status: Active

Okayplayer is an online hip-hop and alternative music website and community, described by Rolling Stone as a "tastemaker" and "an antidote to dull promotional Web sites used by most artists".

== Overview ==
=== Origin ===
The community was founded by The Roots' drummer Ahmir "Questlove" Thompson and author Angela Nissel as a loose musical collective in 1987, and evolved into an online community in 1999. In 2004, Questlove launched Okayplayer Records as a spin-off of the community, in partnership with Decon. After a near-decade hiatus, the label was rebooted in 2012 with Danny! as its flagship artist.

=== Community system, reception, and events ===
This community is made up of recording artists (who keep their official internet homes there), visitors to the site, and individuals who post on the site's message board, the most popular feature of the site.

All of the artists and staff, as well as those who post to the site's message board, are considered "okayplayers," or "OKPs" for short. Okayplayer was one of the first online hubs through which fans could interact directly with their favorite artists. Okayplayer has been identified as an online community that allows people to bypass traditional media and network with each other. An example of such a collaboration fostered by the site is the Foreign Exchange project, with Little Brother's vocalist Phonte Coleman and Dutch producer named Nicolay meeting on Okayplayer, and making an album together by sending tracks and verses back and forth over the Internet. The album, Connected, was released before the pair had met in real life.

According to Questlove, the site was originally a medium to chronicle the day-to-day life of his band, The Roots. However, it became a hub for urban music, politics, arts, and lifestyle. In addition to daily blog updates, the site featured popular messenger boards. Based in New York, Okayplayer eventually expanded into a label that produced live events.

The site also hosts affiliated specialists sites: the Revivalist for jazz, OkayAfrica for African music, LargeUp for reggae, and OkayFuture for electronic music.

In 2011, Okayplayer launched its sister site, OkayAfrica, focused on African culture, politics, and music.

Okayplayer organizes regular tours and an annual Roots Picnic all day event.
