= The State of Things =

The State of Things may refer to:

- The State of Things (film), a 1982 film by Wim Wenders
- The State of Things (EP), a 2000 EP by British rock band Turin Brakes
- The State of Things (album), a 2007 album from Sheffield indie band Reverend and The Makers
- The State of Things (radio show), a current-affairs program broadcast by North Carolina Public Radio
