= Ridin High (Keelay & Zaire album) =

Studio album by Keelay and Zaire
- Released: March 10, 2009
- Genre: Hip-hop
- Length: 1:04:01
- Label: R.N.L.G.
- Producer: Keelay; Zaire

Ridin High is the debut studio album by American hip-hop production duo Keelay and Zaire. It was released on March 10, 2009, via Rob Nonies Label Group. It features guest appearances from Slo Mo, AV, Fortilive, Mario Dones, Blu, Brian Francis, Cali Agents, Da Evangillest, Darien Brockington, Dminor, E. Jenks, Emilio Rojas, FEMI, Gravedigga Jones, Hassaan Mackey, Nino Moschella, Phonte, Prophit, Saafir, Silent Knight, Supastition, Surreal, Tash, Tiffany Paige, Tunji, Jern Eye and Nightclubber Lang.

== Critical reception ==
Professional ratings
Aggregate scores
Source	Rating
Metacritic	74/100
Review scores
Source	Rating
AllHipHop	6/10
Cokemachineglow	68/100%
HipHopDX	3/5
PopMatters	6/10
RapReviews	7.5/10
The Boston Phoenix	3/4 stars

Ridin High was met with generally favourable reviews from music critics. At Metacritic, which assigns a normalized rating out of 100 to reviews from mainstream publications, the album received an average score of 74 based on five reviews.

Patrick Taylor of RapReviews praised the album, concluding: "despite it's [sic] unevenness, Ridin High is a nice portfolio from an up-and-coming duo". Chris Faraone of The Boston Phoenix stated: "their tracks bounce lovelier than Joe Budden's girlfriend on that trampoline (consult YouTube), and they exhibit a flair that distinguishes their cross-continental steeze from that of any other beat team". Clayton Purdom of Cokemachineglow wrote: "Keeley & Zaire's Ridin High has absolutely nothing to offer its listener or hip-hop at large except for a fat pile of old rap comfort food and, tucked evenly away from the beginning and end of the record's runtime, two absolute fucking bangers in 'Addicts for Real' and 'We Made It'".

In her mixed review for HipHopDX, Amanda Bassa stated: "with undeniably strong production styles suited to creating a laid-back mood for discussion of serious topics, Ridin High blends West and East Coast styles smoothly and with finesse to create a unique and desirable hybrid sound". AllHipHop reviewer noted: "for all of the artists and the smooth sounds this album offers, at the end it isn't very memorable". Andrew Martin of PopMatters resumed: "while the final product from Kee & Zee is above-average, it easily could have been something great had the fat been trimmed and some guests left off the roster".

== Track listing ==
No.	Title	Length
1.	"The Intro" (featuring Gravedigga Jones)	2:02
2.	"Take a Ride" (featuring Slo Mo, Mario Dones and AV)	3:45
3.	"Addicts for Real" (featuring Tunji)	4:16
4.	"Cali 2 NY" (featuring Hassaan Mackey, Rasco, Planet Asia and Slo Mo)	4:27
5.	"I Used to Ride" (featuring Fortilive and Saafir)	4:26
6.	"Wake Up" (featuring Emilio Rojas, Silent Knight, AV, Tiffany Paige and Brian Francis)	5:01
7.	"I'm on Swerv" (featuring Tash, Da Evangillest and E. Jenks)	4:20
8.	"Sole Ides Interlude" (featuring Slo Mo)	1:27
9.	"Alright with Me" (featuring Dminor and Phonte)	4:01
10.	"The Times" (featuring Blu, Fortilive and Nino Moschella)	5:54
11.	"Nurf to the Turf" (featuring Prophit)	2:54
12.	"Trapped" (featuring Supastition and Slo Mo)	4:51
13.	"We Made It" (featuring Mario Dones)	3:40
14.	"Beautiful" (featuring Surreal and Darien Brockington)	4:47
15.	"Ridin High" (featuring FEMI)	5:18
16.	"Do What It Do" (featuring Nightclubber Lang and Jern Eye)	2:52
Total length:		1:04:01
