= Dear Friends =

Dear Friends may refer to:

- "Dear Friends", a song by Queen from the album Sheer Heart Attack
- "Dear Friends" (song), a song by Soulhead
- Dear Friends (album), a 1972 album by comedy group The Firesign Theatre
- Dear Friends (radio program), a Firesign Theatre radio series broadcast by KPFK between 1970 and 1971 which formed the basis the above LP
- Dear Friends: An Evening with the Foreign Exchange, an album by The Foreign Exchange
- Dear Friends: Music From Final Fantasy, the name of a concert tour of music from the Final Fantasy video game series
- Final Fantasy V Dear Friends, an album of arranged music from Final Fantasy V
- "Dear Friends" (CBS Playhouse), a CBS Playhouse production from the 1967 television season.
- Dear Friends (2007 film), a 2007 Japanese drama film
