= Jeanne Jolly =

American singer-songwriter

- Born: Jeanne Jolly
- Origin: Raleigh, North Carolina
- Genres: country, western, folk, americana
- Occupations: Singer-songwriter, record producer, music producer
- Instruments: voice, guitar, baritone ukulele, piano
- Years active: 2007–present
- Labels: Ramblewood Records, +FE Music
- Website: Jeanne Jolly Soundcloud

Jeanne Jolly is a singer-songwriter from Raleigh, North Carolina, who first gained fame as a featured vocalist for Grammy Award winning jazz trumpeter Chris Botti. Jolly has performed with several symphonies, at Carnegie Hall in New York City, and at the Monterey Jazz Festival in California.

Jolly attended Saint Mary's School in Raleigh and then Western Carolina University. She graduated with a master's degree in classical voice from the New England Conservatory of Music.

Jolly was featured on the June 29, 2012, episode of WUNC's The State of Things with Frank Stasio discussing her upcoming album and her mother's death to cancer. On October 2, 2012, Jolly released her first full-length album, Angels, on Foreign Exchange Music. It was produced entirely by The Foreign Exchange collaborator Chris Boerner.

On October 11, 2014, Jeanne married Todd McLean in a ceremony at Emerald Isle, North Carolina.

== Discography ==
Studio albums

- 2012: Angels
- 2015: A Place To Run

EPs

- 2010: Falling in Carolina

Singles

- 2010: Here With You
- 2011: Laughing at Your Plans (with The Foreign Exchange)
- 2012: Hallelujah
- 2012: Sweet Love
- 2013: The Hard Way
- 2013: Good Man
