= Muhsinah =

American singer-songwriter (born 1983)

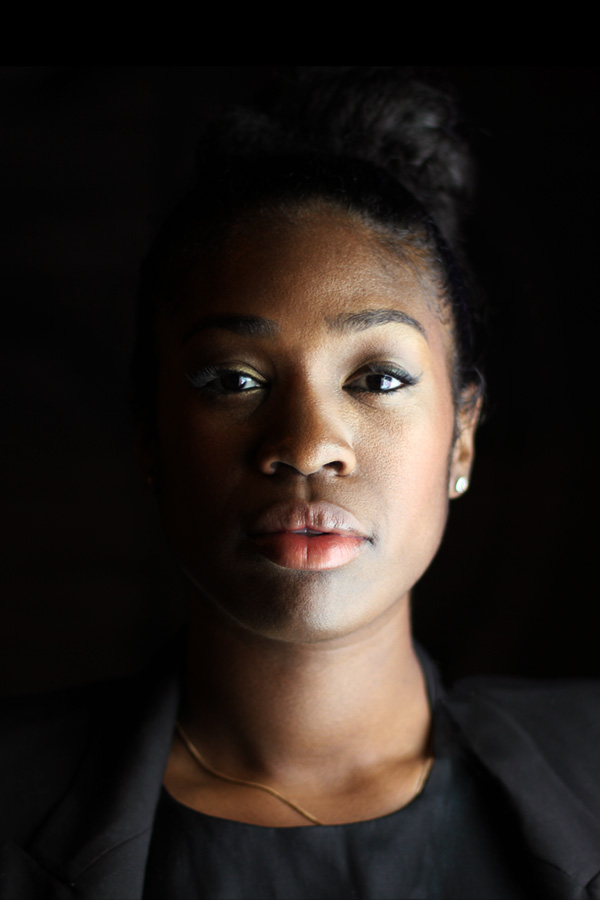

Background information
- Also known as: Sinah, The Golden Girl
- Born: Muhsinah Abdul-Karim; July 20, 1983 (age 43)
- Origin: Washington, D.C., US
- Genre: R&B / Indie pop
- Occupations: Singer/songwriter, record producer, composer, arranger
- Instruments: Vocals, piano, synthesizers
- Years active: 2007–present
- Label: Unsigned
- Website: muhsinah.com

Muhsinah (/mʊˈsiːnə/; born July 20, 1983) is an American Grammy Award nominated singer and producer, from Washington, D.C.

She cites Chick Corea, Herbie Hancock, Quincy Jones, Nirvana and Chopin as among her influences.

== Musical career ==
A graduate of the Duke Ellington School of the Arts and of Howard University, Muhsinah's self-produced EP day.break 2.0 (2008) was described by XLR8R magazine as "a beautiful smack in the face of mainstream hip-hop and R&B convention".

Though a small scale independent release, it attracted the attention of rappers Common as well as Phonte of Little Brother/The Foreign Exchange, both of whom she later recorded with, appearing on Common's Universal Mind Control and The Foreign Exchange's Leave It All Behind.

The Washington Post has written of her as being "part of a new breed of young soul rebels who seamlessly meld electronic beats with layers of jazzy arrangements and unorthodox song structure", and as "equally at home chopping loops and tapping pads on an Akai MPC as she is behind a piano keyboard".

Muhsinah was acknowledged by Radiohead frontman, Thom Yorke, on their website Dead Air Space on March 15, 2010 when he listed the song, "Lose My Fuse (Produced By Flying Lotus)" among his favorites at the time the post was published.

From 2012 to 2013, she toured with The Weeknd as a backing vocalist.

== Awards and nominations ==
Year	Award	Category	Result
2010	"Daykeeper" (with The Foreign Exchange)	Best Urban/Alternative Performance	Nominated

== Discography ==
=== Extended plays ===
Year	Album title	Label
2007	day.break (US) / pre.lude (JP)	Rxlngr / Circulations
2008	The Oscillations: Sine	Rxlngr – (Digital Only)
2009	The Oscillations: Triangle	Rxlngr – (Digital Only)
2014	M	Self-released
2016	January	Self-released
2016	February	Self-released
2016	March	Self-released
2016	April	Self-released
2016	May	Self-released
2016	June	Self-released
2016	July	Self-released
2016	August	Self-released

=== Production ===
- Ruff Drafts Volume 1 (Track: 3) – JapaNUBIA Musik 2006
- Getback (Track: 6/7 Interlude ) – ABB 2007
- day.break (Tracks: All) – Rxlngr 2007
- pre.lude (Tracks: All) – Circulations 2008
- Higher Ground (Track: 3) – Wayna Quiet Power Productions 2008
- The Awakening (Track: 3) – JapaNUBIA Musik 2008
- Border Breaker (Tracks: 1,3,5) – Ghetto Falsetto 2009
- The Oscillations:Sine (Tracks: All) – Rxlngr 2009
- The Oscillations:Triangle (Tracks: All except 2,4,5 & 7) – Rxlngr 2009

=== Guest appearances ===
- Ruff Drafts Volume 1 (Tracks: 3) – JapaNUBIA Musik 2006
- I Predict A Riot (Tracks: 1 & 18) – Soulspasm Records, Inc. 2007
- Cuba After Market (Tracks: 3 & 13 ) – Humble Monarch Music/Rawkus 50 2007
- Producer No. 1 (Track: 7) – Fat City Records 2007
- Suite903 No.15 (CD#2 Track: 16) – Fader Label 2007
- Blunt Park Sessions (413) (Track: 2 ) – Rude Squire/Rawkus 50 2007
- Higher Ground (Track: 3) – Quiet Power Productions 2008
- Leave It All Behind (Tracks: 1, 5 & 10) – Hard Boiled 2008
- Down To You 12" (Track: B1) – Planetgroove 2008
- Universal Mind Control (Track: 7) – G.O.O.D/Geffen 2008
- Arale 01 (Are In Be) – Arale.tv 2009
- Odd Summer EP (Track: 8) – Oddisee Music 2009
- Adroit Adventures 12" (Track: A2) – Ubiquity 2009
- Kilawatt: V2 (Track: 1) – Kilawatt Music Limited 2010
- Love2 (Track: 10) – Reel People Music Ltd. 2023
