= Keelay and Zaire =

Keelay & Zaire
- Birth name: Kyle Pierce, Tim Lewis
- Origin: Salt Lake City, Utah, United States Dayton, Ohio, United States
- Genres: Hip hop
- Occupation: Record producers
- Instrument(s): drums, Turntable, Sampler, Drum Machine
- Labels: Myx Music

Kyle "Keelay" Pierce (born December 5, 1980) and Tim "Zaire" Lewis (born March 1, 1980), better known as Keelay & Zaire, are hip hop producers from the San Francisco, California and Newport News, Virginia areas respectively. The production team met on an online message board.

== Biography ==
Keelay, originally from the city of Salt Lake City, Utah, now resides in San Francisco, California, and is in charge of the duo's West Coast production headquarters, The Torta Oven. Keelay is a talented producer who got his start in hip hop by working with the likes of Cali Agents, Fortilive, and Saafir, prominent emcees within the hip hop genre.

Zaire, originating from Dayton, Ohio, now resides in Newport News, Virginia, and supplies the other half of the production work from Sole Vibe Studios East, located in Newport News as well. On the east coast, Zaire maintains a constant flow of music by collaborating with local Virginian artists, most notably emcee/songwriter Khizman of Trophy Winner Records, a native of the city of Norfolk, VA, and Newport News' own singer/songwriter Jonathan Moore.

Keelay & Zaire released a free EP in January 2009 entitled 'Prelude To Drive EP' on Myx Music Label, featuring artists such as Supastition, Khizman and Tiffany Paige, and will release their debut LP 'Ridin' High' on February 24, 2009.

In recent years Keelay and Zaire have been pursuing their music careers separately. In 2012 Zaire released his first solo album, titled “Warrior King”. The album was followed by albums "New World" and "May Flower". Zaire's latest album, "Royal Blue Dream" was released on May 1, 2015. Zaire is also CEO of his own Philadelphia-based record label called Foreva Young.

== Discography ==
=== Solo ===
- 2006: "The Sole Vibe-The Appetizer"
- 2006: "Smoke and Mirrors (The Sole Vibe Remixes)"
- 2007: "Ridin High EP"
- 2009: "Prelude To Drive EP", CD
- 2009: Ridin High, LP/CD

=== Production credits ===
- 2005: "Scion CD Sampler Vol.12"
- 2007: "NCAA College Hoops 2k7"
- 2007: Emilio Rojas-"A Breath Of Fresh Air"
- 2007: Surreal-"Intelligent Design"
- 2008: Shaya-"Fallen Awake"
- 2008: Cre-8-"Keep Movin' EP"
- 2008: Supastition-"Leave Of Absence EP (Digital Version)"
- 2008: Crew 54-"Aggressive Soul"
- 2008: DJ JRonin-"All Elements Mixtapes Vol. 8, 9 and 10"
- 2008: Evangillest-"Quit Ya Dayjob Mixtape"
- 2010: Donwill-"Leading Lady" from Don Cusack in High Fidelity
- 2010: Mario Dones-"Ring To It"
