= Authenticity (album) =

Studio album by the Foreign Exchange
- Released: October 12, 2010
- Studio: The Peanut Gallery; The Beach House (Wilmington, NC); The Burlap Palace (Raleigh, NC); Sound Pure Studios (Durham, NC)
- Genre: R&B; neo soul
- Length: 38:41
- Label: The Foreign Exchange Music
- Producer: Nicolay

The Foreign Exchange chronology
Leave It All Behind (2008)	Authenticity (2010)	Dear Friends: An Evening with the Foreign Exchange (2011)

Authenticity is the third studio album by American musical duo the Foreign Exchange. It was released on October 12, 2010 via The Foreign Exchange Music. The album peaked at number 145 on the Billboard 200 chart in the US.

== Critical reception ==
Professional ratings
Aggregate scores
Source	Rating
Metacritic	86/100
Review scores
Source	Rating
AllMusic	4/5 stars
HipHopDX	3/5
Pitchfork	7.6/10
Prefix	8/10
The A.V. Club	B+
Urb	4.5/5 stars

Authenticity was met with universal acclaim from music critics. At Metacritic, which assigns a normalized rating out of 100 to reviews from mainstream publications, the album received an average score of 86 based on five reviews.

Urb reviewer praised the album, stating: "what I realized listening to this studio masterpiece is that Phonte, Dwele, and Aloe Blacc are all former MC's with new grown and sexy albums out this year worth purchasing". Nathan Rabin of The A.V. Club called the album "a work of hushed intimacy and unabashed romanticism that uses synthesizers to create incongruously organic, natural-sounding grown-folks R&B". AllMusic's Andy Kellman wrote: "more moody, modern R&B that sounds like nothing else and reveals remarkable depth (there's even a little well-placed twang and some violin), Authenticity is neither an everyday nor an every-day album, unless playing it is necessary for the sake of convalescence". Andrew Martin of Prefix magazine described the album as "a concise, cohesive effort that finds The Foreign Exchange again successfully pushing the boundaries of R&B, soul, electronic music, and hip-hop". Tal Rosenberg of Pitchfork concluded: "the music on Authenticity may initially sound remedial and elemental, even saccharine, but further listens reveal new intricacies".

== Track listing ==
No.	Title	Length
1.	"The Last Fall"	4:32
2.	"Authenticity"	3:42
3.	"Eyes to the Sky"	1:33
4.	"All Roads"	3:46
5.	"Fight for Love"	3:49
6.	"Maybe She'll Dream of Me"	4:25
7.	"Don't Wait"	3:52
8.	"Make Me a Fool"	4:31
9.	"Everything Must Go"	2:03
10.	"Laughing at Your Plans"	3:19
11.	"This City Ain't the Same Without You"	3:09
Total length:		38:41

== Charts ==
Chart	Peak position
US Billboard 200	145
US Top R&B/Hip-Hop Albums (Billboard)	23
US Heatseekers Albums (Billboard)	3
US Independent Albums (Billboard)	26
