= Beauty Within: Sinister Beauty Reimagined =

Remix album by Windimoto
- Released: 25 January 2011
- Recorded: Spring–winter 2010
- Genre: Dance, deep house
- Length: 94:16
- Label: Windimoto Music
- Producer: Windimoto

Windimoto chronology
Sinister Beauty (2009)	Beauty Within: Sinister Beauty Reimagined (2011)

Beauty Within: Sinister Beauty Reimagined is a remix album by American dance music production duo Windimoto.

== Background information ==
Beauty Within features remixes of songs from Windimoto's studio album Sinister Beauty. Featured remixers are Glenn Underground, Anthony Nicholson, Chicago Skyway, Latin Soul Brothas, Sevany2, Primus Luta, Jozana, Sandman & Riverside, and Tronik.

The album contains 3 new songs and 1 previously unreleased remix by Windimoto.

The remix album was conceived as a way to keep the group visible while they prepared their next studio album. Beauty Within was released digitally on January 25, 2011. The CD version of the album was released on March 8, 2011. The digital version of the album contains four bonus tracks.

== Track listing ==
All tracks written by Sean Haley and Scorpeze; except where indicated.

1. "Moments in Mid-Air" - 5:10
2. "Love You More (Holding On) (Anthony Nicholson's Organic Soul Remix)" - 7:54
3. "An Afternoon In Rio (Only You) (Sandman and Riverside Remix)" (Haley, Scorpeze, Mahon) - 6:37
4. "Fever (Chicago Skyway Remix)" - 5:14
5. "Grownasswoman (Windimoto's Fine Wine Remix)" (Burgess, Behn) - 6:00
6. "The Maasai Ritual" - 6:40
7. "An Afternoon In Rio (Glenn Underground Remix)" - 6:42
8. "Sinister Beauty (Scorpeze's Bumaye Remix)" - (Haley) 5:57
9. "Love You More (DJSH's Broken Hearts, Broken Beats Remix)" - 5:29
10. "Shake It Down (Latin Soul Brothas Mix)" - 6:12
11. "There Are Better Days For Us (Sevany2's TGIF Invasion Mix)" - 5:40
12. "Hot Night Strut" - 5:32

Digital version bonus tracks:

13. "An Afternoon in Rio (Favela Beatdown Remix)" - 5:27
14. "Find The Way (Jozana's Lake Shore Drive Remix)" (Haley, Scorpeze, Mahon) - 7:38
15. "Three Scenes (Scene Four Mix)" (Haley, Scorpeze, Francis Adams) - 4:29
16. "Find The Way (DJSH's Standing On The Edge Remix)" - 3:35
