= Conflict (Sy Smith album) =

Studio album by Sy Smith
- Released: April 1, 2008
- Genre: Neo-Soul
- Label: Psyko! Inc.
- Producer: Ty Macklin; Sy Smith; Deidre King; Kelo Saunders; Annya Bell

Sy Smith chronology
| The Syberspace Social (2005) | Conflict (2008) | Fast and Curious (2012) |

Singles from Conflict
- 1. "Fly Away With Me" Released: March 14, 2008

Conflict is the third studio album by American singer, Sy Smith. The album was officially released on April 1, 2008, in the United States.

== Track listing ==
1. "Conflict (This is Your Brain on Drugs)"
2. "Fly Away With Me"
3. "The Things I Do"
4. "Overthought" (featuring Bilal Salaam)
5. "The Art of You"
6. "Spies"
7. "Ain't Nobody's Bizness"
8. "Reach Down in Your Soul" (featuring Wes Felton)
9. "B-Side Love Affair"
10. "Would All the People from Compton Please Leave?" (Minnie Reprise)
11. "Star"
