= Psykosoul =

Studio album by Sy Smith
- Released: 1999; 2005 (Psykosoul +)
- Recorded: 1999
- Genre: R&B, neo soul
- Length: 53:13
- Label: Hollywood
- Producer: Eric Benet, Madukwu Chinwah, Arvel McClinton III, Ali Shaheed Muhammad, Sy Smith

Sy Smith chronology
Psykosoul (1999)	The Syberspace Social (2005)

Alternative cover
- Psykosoul Plus cover

Professional ratings
Review scores
Source	Rating
AllMusic	3/5 stars

Psykosoul is the debut studio album by R&B/neo soul singer/songwriter Sy Smith. The album was originally released as a advance/promotional CD in 1999 on Hollywood Records, and would be shelved from an official release. The critically acclaimed album included the singles "Gladly" and "Good N'Strong," as well as a standout cover of Edie Brickell's "What I Am" which also made an appearance on the television soundtrack of the animated series The PJ's.

Five years later, Psykosoul was later re-released as Psykosoul Plus, featuring two bonus tracks and a remix.

== Track listing ==
=== Psykosoul (2000) ===
1. Good N Strong (4:48)
2. Gladly (4:07)
3. That Ring (4:15)
4. One (4:33)
5. Deep Sleep (4:18)
6. Stop Askin' (3:30)
7. Broke My Heart (4:34)
8. Distance (3:45)
9. Can't (5:13)
10. Talking to a Wall (4:22)
11. Waiting... Contemplating (5:14)
12. What I Am (4:34)

=== Psykosoul Plus (2005) ===
1. Deep Sleep (Axis remix)
2. That Ring
3. Waiting...Contemplating
4. Good And Strong
5. Stop Askin'
6. You're the One
7. Distance
8. Broke My Heart
9. Gladly
10. Talking 2 A Wall
11. Do Things (bonus track)
12. What I Am
13. Welcome Back (bonus track)
14. Deep Sleep (original version)
15. Can't

== Singles ==
=== Gladly ===
Track listing

1. Gladly (clean)
2. Gladly (clean – no rap)
3. Gladly (instrumental)
4. Gladly (LP version)

=== Good N Strong ===
Track listing

1. Good N Strong (radio mix)
2. Good N Strong (LP version)
3. Good N Strong (instrumental)
