= Fly Away with Me =

"Fly Alway With Me"

Single by Sy Smith

from the album Conflict
- Released: March 14, 2008
- Recorded: 2007
- Genre: R&B
- Length: 3:41
- Label: Psyko! Records/MDI Distribution
- Songwriters: Sy Smith, Kay of the Foundation
- Producer: Ty Macklin

Sy Smith singles chronology
"Reach Down In Your Soul" (2007)	"Fly Alway With Me" (2008)	"Conflict (This Is Your Brain on Drugs)" (2008)

"Fly Away With Me" is a song recorded by American singer-songwriter Sy Smith. It was written by Sy Smith and Kay of the Foundation, and produced by Ty Macklin for Smith's third studio album, Conflict.

== Overview ==
I wanted this song to feel like love in the springtime. That's what the music felt like to me the first time I heard it.

— Sy Smith, Soultracks

Following the less successful chart performances of buzz single "Reach Down In Your Soul", the record was released as the album's first official single during the first quarter of 2008 (see 2008 in music) in North America. "Fly Away With Me" is a slow-tempo composition featuring R&B production and soul elements. While most of the tracks featured on Conflict are mid-tempo, "Fly Away With Me" was well received by critics for its beat-driven melody. The song peaked into the Top 40 Hot Adult R&B Singles Airplay Chart at #38. Fly Away With Me is Smith's first song to chart on the Hot Adult R&B Singles Airplay Chart and her second song to chart on any Billboard chart ("Gladly" is the first).

== Music video ==
Sy Smith and her husband Shawn Peterson in the video "Fly Away With Me".

The video was shot on March 13, 2008 with Shawn Carter Peterson as the director. The song aired Centric's Soul Sessions and VH1 Soul.

The video features Smith singing in her house while writing the lyrics to her song. Her husband (Shawn Carter Peterson) then comes in and brings her fruit that he feeds to her. She then sings her lyrics to him while being held in his arms. They are later seen walking down a path as Peterson tells her to cover her eyes as he runs away (playing hide-and-seek). She later finds him and they are seen at the end of the video watching the sunset. Other scenes include Smith singing in a meadow and in a tree.

== Formats and track listings ==
- CD single
1. Album Version
2. Remix (featuring Kay of the Production)

== Credits and personnel ==
- Vocals: Sy Smith
- Writers: Sy Smith and Kay of the Foundation
- Producers: Ty Macklin
