= Love in Flying Colors =

Studio album by the Foreign Exchange
- Released: September 24, 2013
- Genre: R&B, neo soul
- Length: 44:14
- Label: Foreign Exchange Music
- Producer: Nicolay

The Foreign Exchange chronology
Dear Friends: An Evening with the Foreign Exchange (2011)	Love in Flying Colors (2013)	Tales from the Land of Milk and Honey (2015)

Professional ratings
Aggregate scores
Source	Rating
Metacritic	81/100
Review scores
Source	Rating
AllMusic	5/5 stars
Exclaim!	8/10
HipHopDX	4.0/5
Pitchfork	6.5/10

Love in Flying Colors is the fourth studio album by the Foreign Exchange, released in 2013. It peaked at number 115 on the Billboard 200 chart. Spin listed it as one of the "20 Best R&B Albums of 2013".

== Track listing ==
No.	Title	Length
1.	"If I Knew Then"	4:04
2.	"Right After Midnight"	4:18
3.	"Better"	4:58
4.	"On a Day Like Today"	4:16
5.	"Listen to the Rain"	3:06
6.	"Call It Home"	3:58
7.	"The Moment"	5:44
8.	"Can't Turn Around"	4:43
9.	"Dreams Are Made for Two"	4:50
10.	"When I Feel Love"	4:17

== Charts ==
Chart	Peak position
US Billboard 200	115
US Top R&B/Hip-Hop Albums (Billboard)	22
US Heatseekers Albums (Billboard)	1
US Independent Albums (Billboard)	22
