= Phonte =

American rapper, singer, and producer

Phonte Coleman
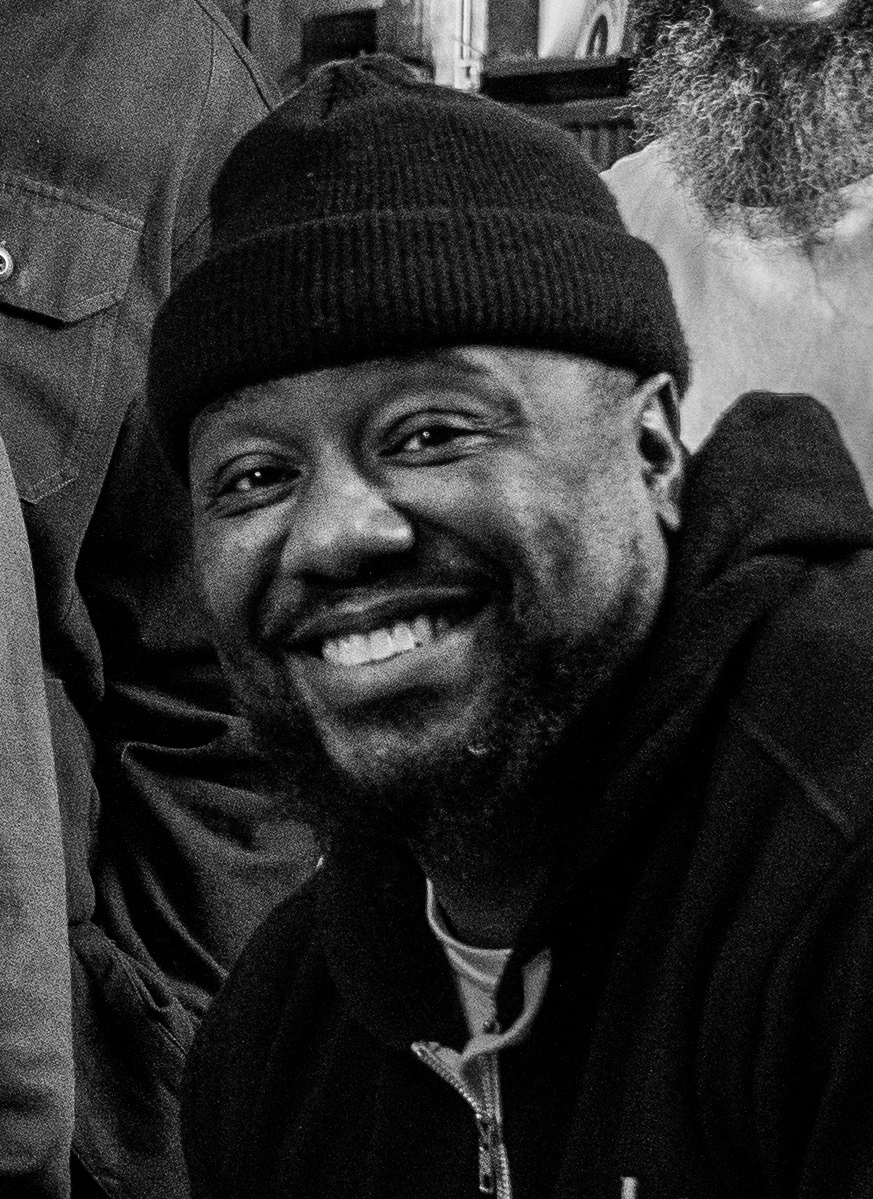
- Phonte in 2023

Background information
- Also known as: Percy Miracles
- Born: Phonte Lyshod Coleman; December 28, 1978 (age 47); Lumberton, North Carolina, U.S.
- Genres: Hip hop; R&B
- Occupations: Rapper; singer; songwriter; actor; producer; voice-over artist
- Years active: 1998–present
- Label: Foreign Exchange Music
- Member of: Little Brother; The Foreign Exchange
- Formerly of: Justus League

Phonte Lyshod Coleman, known mononymously as Phonte (born December 28, 1978), is an American rapper, singer, producer, actor, and voice over artist. He is a member of the North Carolina hip-hop trio/duo Little Brother and one-half of the duo The Foreign Exchange. His music spans multiple genres including R&B, hip-hop, house and electronic music.

== Early life ==
Phonte Coleman was born in Lumberton, North Carolina, and was raised in Red Springs, North Carolina. His family moved to Greensboro, North Carolina in 1987–1988. He grew up singing in a church choir, and played trumpet starting in middle school and participating in the North Carolina All-State Band. He also played football in high school, then as a fullback for two years at North Carolina Central University, where he was an English major.

== Career ==
=== Little Brother ===
Little Brother is an underground hip-hop group composed of Phonte, rapper Big Pooh and producer 9th Wonder. The group met in 1998, while attending North Carolina Central University. The three shared common musical interests and decided to form a group. "Speed", the group's first song recorded together, led to them signing a deal with the independent ABB Records in 2002, and recording their debut album, The Listening. The forums of the website Okayplayer were ignited by interest from a growing fanbase. The album's success led to the group signing a non-exclusive deal with Atlantic Records in 2004.

The group's 2005 album, The Minstrel Show, was a concept album based on a fictional television network called "UBN" (U Black Niggas Network). The album has been described as satirizing the connection between minstrel shows and stereotypical industry and self-constructions of Blackness in entertainment and advertisements. The album received positive reviews, without commercial success. During the recording of their third album, the group announced the departure of 9th Wonder, as well as a parting of ways with their label. They returned to ABB Records and released Getback in late 2007. Getback was Little Brother's first album as a duo. In 2010, they released their fourth studio album, Leftback.

In 2023, Little Brother released the documentary film, May the Lord Watch: The Little Brother Story about the group's history, which was directed by Holland Randolph Gallagher.

=== The Foreign Exchange ===
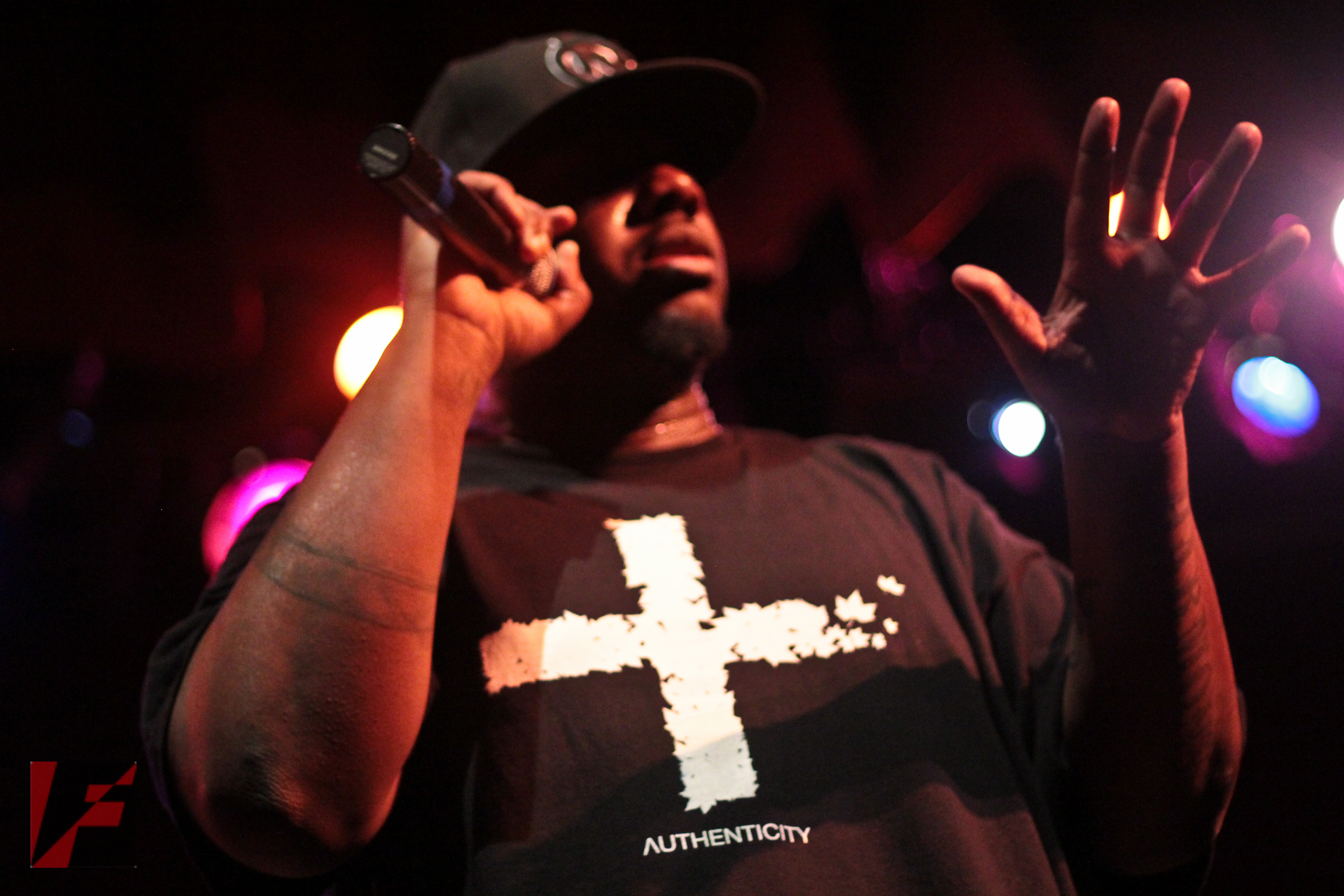
Phonte performing in 2011

Phonte met Dutch producer Nicolay virtually on an Okayplayer message board. The duo released their debut album, Connected in 2004, having never met face to face.

Their second album, Leave It All Behind was released in 2008. The group received a Nomination for the Grammy Award for Best Urban/Alternative Performance for the track "Daykeeper" (featuring Muhsinah) from Leave It All Behind. Their third album, Authenticity, released on October 12, 2010, peaked at number 145 on the Billboard 200 chart in the US and Number 23 on the U.S. Hot R&B/Hip-Hop Songs chart. Love in Flying Colors, their fourth studio album, was released in 2013. The album's track "Better" was featured on Barack Obama’s 2022 playlist. The album Tales from the Land of Milk and Honey was released in 2015. Their album Hide&Seek was released in 2017.

=== Solo work ===
Phonte has released two solo albums, and has appeared on numerous records by other artists as a vocalist. His lyrics tend to include perspectives on working-class life.

He released his solo-debut titled Charity Starts at Home on September 27, 2011 on the label FE Music. His second album, No News Is Good News (FE), was released on March 2, 2018. No News Is Good News was included in Bandcamp Daily's best-100-albums-of-2018 year-end list (placed at number 42).

=== TV and other media ===
Phonte has composed music for soundtracks and TV, and is a voice over artist and actor. He did voice acting and composed music for the animated TV series, The Boondocks, as well as the series, Black Dynamite. He composed songs with DJ Premier for the TV series, The Breaks (VH1), 2016–2017. He was featured on several episodes in the role of "Imam Ali" in a script on the 1990s American music industry. He did voice acting for a commercial honoring Russell Westbrook's NBA Most Valuable Player win in 2017.

Phonte has composed multiple raps for Sesame Street characters, including a song for SZA’s Sesame Street appearance with a duet with Elmo entitled "Gratitude," in addition to other songs including "Apple vs. Banana" ft. Tavi Fields and "BBQ vs. Hike." He was a member of "Team Supreme", co-hosting Questlove's podcast, Questlove Supreme from 2016 to 2025. Questlove Supreme won six Webby Awards and the 2023 Music Podcast of the Year for the iHeartRadio Podcast Awards.

== Discography ==
=== Studio albums ===
List of studio albums, with selected chart positions
| Title | Album details | Peak chart positions | |
| Title | Album details | US | US R&B |
|---|---|---|---|
| Charity Starts at Home | Released: September 27, 2011; Label: Foreign Exchange Music; Format: CD, LP, digital download | 61 | 9 |
| No News Is Good News | Released: March 2, 2018; Label: Foreign Exchange Music; Format: CD, LP, digital download | — | — |

=== Collaborative albums ===
List of collaborative albums, with selected chart positions
| Title | Album details | Peak chart positions | |
| Title | Album details | US | US R&B |
|---|---|---|---|
| Love the 80's (with Zo! as Zo! & Tigallo) | Released: July 22, 2008; Label: Hall of Justus; Format: CD, digital download | — | — |
| Tigallerro (with Eric Roberson) | Released: July 22, 2016; Label: Foreign Exchange Music; Format: CD, digital download | — | 19 |
"—" denotes a recording that did not chart or was not released in that territory.

=== Extended plays ===
| Title | Album details |
|---|---|
| Pacific Time | Released: March 29, 2019; Label: The Foreign Exchange Music; Format: Digital download |

=== With Little Brother ===
- The Listening (2003)
- The Minstrel Show (2005)
- Getback (2007)
- Leftback (2010)
- May the Lord Watch (2019)

=== With The Foreign Exchange ===
- Connected (2004)
- Leave It All Behind (2008)
- Authenticity (2010)
- Love in Flying Colors (2013)
- Tales from the Land of Milk and Honey (2015)

=== Guest appearances ===
List of guest appearances
| Title | Year | Other performer(s) | Album |
|---|---|---|---|
| "The Animal" | 2004 | Murs | Murs 3:16: The 9th Edition |
| "Every Block" | 2005 | Rapper Big Pooh | Sleepers |
| "Make It Hot" | 2005 | The Away Team, Joe Scudda | National Anthem |
| "Birdz (Fly the Coup)" | 2005 | Buckshot, 9th Wonder, Keisha Shontelle | Chemistry |
| "Backstage Girl" | 2006 | DJ Shadow | The Outsider |
| "4Everyday" | 2006 | Liquid Spirits | Liquid Spirits |
| "Let It Be Known" | 2007 | Sean Price | Jesus Price Supastar |
| "Been in Love" | 2007 | Eric Roberson | ...Left |
| "Letyourselfgo" | 2007 | Evidence, The Alchemist | The Weatherman LP |
| "Alright With Me" | 2007 | Dminor, Keelay & Zaire | Ridin' High |
| "Think Good Thoughts" | 2007 | Drake, Elzhi | Comeback Season |
| "Yellow Lines" | 2007 | CunninLynguists, Witchdoctor | Dirty Acres |
| "The Time Is Now" | 2008 | Jean Grae | Jeanius |
| "Callin' Me" | 2008 | S1 | Music Box |
| "Close Call" | 2008 | 88-Keys | The Death of Adam |
| "For Whom the Bell Tolls" | 2008 | Evidence, Blu, will.i.am | The Layover EP |
| "The Perch" | 2008 | Oddisee, Tor | 101 |
| "All Because She's Gone" | 2008 | Oddisee | 101 |
| "True Love" | 2009 | Apathy | Wanna Snuggle? |
| "Something 2 Ride 2" | 2009 | Royce da 5'9" | Street Hop |
| "Best of Times" | 2010 | Strong Arm Steady | In Search of Stoney Jackson |
| "Cry Over You" | 2010 | Yahzarah | The Ballad of Purple St. James |
| "How High" | 2010 | Rhymefest | El Che |
| "Now or Never" | 2010 | The Roots, Dice Raw | How I Got Over |
| "The Day" | 2010 | The Roots, Blu, Patty Crash | How I Got Over |
| "Greater Than the Sun" | 2010 | Zo! | SunStorm |
| "Say How You Feel" | 2010 | Zo!, Carlitta Durand | SunStorm |
| "Flight of the Blackbyrd" | 2010 | Zo! | SunStorm |
| "I'll Be There" | 2011 | Mac Miller | Best Day Ever |
| "Black Hand Side" | 2011 | Pharoahe Monch, Styles P | W.A.R. (We Are Renegades) |
| "One Time" | 2011 | Rapsody, Tab-One, Charlie Smarts | Thank H.E.R. Now |
| "Babble" | 2011 | The Physics | Love Is a Business |
| "Take a Chance" | 2011 | Median | The Sender |
| "Turn Ya On" | 2011 | Median, Big Remo | The Sender |
| "Special" | 2011 | Median, Yahzarah, Bahamadia | The Sender |
| "Band Practice Pt. 2" | 2011 | 9th Wonder, Median | The Wonder Years |
| "One Night" | 2011 | 9th Wonder, Terrace Martin, Bird & The Midnight Falcons | The Wonder Years |
| "See U Later" | 2011 | The Away Team | Scars & Stripes |
| "Picture Perfect" | 2011 | Eric Roberson | Mister Nice Guy |
| "One Time" | 2011 | The Roots, Dice Raw | Undun |
| "I'll Be Around" | 2012 | Brother Ali, Stokley Williams | The Bite Marked Heart |
| "Goodbye" | 2012 | JR & PH7, Median | The Goodlife |
| "Afro Blue (9th Wonder's Blue Light Basement Remix)" | 2012 | Robert Glasper Experiment, Erykah Badu | Black Radio Recovered: The Remix EP |
| "Making Time" | 2013 | Zo!, Choklate | ManMade |
| "ManMade" | 2013 | Zo! | ManMade |
| "Out in the World" | 2013 | Zo!, Choklate | ManMade |
| "Jedi Code" | 2013 | Rapsody, Jay Electronica | She Got Game |
| "Temperamental" | 2013 | RJD2 | More Is Than Isn't |
| "No Competition" | 2014 | Talib Kweli, Elzhi | 9th Wonder Presents Jamla Is the Squad |
| "A Matter of the Heart" | 2014 | Jesse Boykins III | Love Apparatus |
| "Requiem" | 2015 | Oddisee | Persona |
| "Impayshunt" | 2015 | dEnAuN | sTuFf in My BaCkPaCk |
| "Finer Things" | 2015 | MED, Blu, Madlib, Likewise | Bad Neighbor |
| "Highs and Lows" | 2015 | PRhyme, MF Doom | PRhyme (Deluxe Version) |
| "Clap Shit Up" | 2016 | Torae | Entitled |
| "Violets" | 2016 | Miles Davis, Robert Glasper | Everything's Beautiful |
| "One Too Many" | 2016 | Kaytranada | 99.9% |
| "Treat You Right" | 2016 | Mickey Factz, Nottz | The Achievement: circa '82 |
| "Invitation" | 2017 | JR & PH7, St. Joe Louis, Tamisha Waden | Coral Cadavers |
| "Donuts" | 2018 | Andy Mineo | The Sword |
| "Woke as Me" | 2019 | Open Mike Eagle | |
| "Blackberry" | 2020 | Carlitta Durand | Kismet Green |
| "Uzbekistan" | 2020 | Your Old Droog, Mach-Hommy | Dump YOD: Krutoy Edition |
| "Who" | 2021 | Topaz Jones, Maxo | Don't Go Tellin' Your Momma |
| "Be Mine" | 2021 | Emmavie, Saint Ezekiel | What's a Diamond to a Baby |
| "Choices" | 2023 | Oddisee, BeMyFiasco, Kay Young | To What End |
| "Otherside" | 2023 | Rory, BeMyFiasco | I Thought It'd Be Different |
| "No Wish" | 2023 | Black Milk, Raphael Saadiq | Everybody Good? |
| "You Don't Know" | 2024 | Lalah Hathaway | VANTABLACK |

== Awards and nominations ==
- Nomination, Grammy Award for Best Urban/Alternative Performance for the track "Daykeeper," with The Foreign Exchange, featuring Muhsinah, from Leave It All Behind
- Nomination, Grammy Award for Best R&B Album, Vocalist, on "Vantablack" by Lalah Hathaway, 2024

== See also ==
- The Foreign Exchange
- Little Brother (group)
- Questlove Supreme
