= Tales from the Land of Milk and Honey =

Studio album by the Foreign Exchange
- Released: August 21, 2015
- Genre: R&B, neo soul
- Length: 39:01
- Label: Foreign Exchange Music
- Producer: Nicolay

The Foreign Exchange chronology
Love in Flying Colors (2013)	Tales from the Land of Milk and Honey (2015)

Professional ratings
Review scores
Source	Rating
AllMusic	4.5/5 stars
Exclaim!	8/10
HipHopDX	3.5/5
NPR	favorable
Pitchfork	7.4/10

Tales from the Land of Milk and Honey is the fifth studio album by the Foreign Exchange, released in 2015. NPR listed it as one of the "Top 10 Slept-On R&B Albums of 2015".

== Track listing ==
No.	Title	Length
1.	"Milk and Honey"	4:08
2.	"Work It to the Top"	3:45
3.	"Truce"	3:43
4.	"Disappear"	4:25
5.	"Sevenths and Ninths"	1:40
6.	"Asking for a Friend"	4:26
7.	"Body"	4:30
8.	"As Fast As You Can"	3:48
9.	"Face in the Reflection"	5:03
10.	"Until the Dawn (Milk and Honey Pt. II)"	3:33

== Charts ==
Chart	Peak position
US Top R&B/Hip-Hop Albums (Billboard)	12
US Heatseekers Albums (Billboard)	2
US Independent Albums (Billboard)	16
