= Wale Oyejide =

Nigerian-American lawyer, musician and fashion designer

Walé Oyéjidé is a Nigerian-American lawyer, musician, filmmaker and fashion designer. He is the founder and Creative Director of the fashion company Ikiré Jones.

== Early life ==
Oyéjidé was born in 1981, in Ibadan, Nigeria to a Yoruba family. In the 1990s, he moved to Dubai, United Arab Emirates, with his mother before moving to Alabama in his teenage years.

== Education ==
Oyéjidé studied law and went to law school.

== Careers ==
=== Musical career ===
Oyéjidé has released four musical albums, including one day everything changed (2004), Broken Jazz 101 (2004), and Africahot! The Afrofuture Sessions (2006).

=== Law career ===
Oyéjidé left music for law school. He practiced law for some years before delving into fashion.

=== Fashion career ===
Oyéjidé started his fashion company, Ikiré Jones, in 2014 after quitting his job as a lawyer. Ikiré Jones, as described by Oyéjidé during his interview with Okayafrica, is a combination of Neapolitan tailoring and African aesthetics. Ikiré Jones designed some outfits for the Marvel movie Black Panther.

=== Writing career ===
He contributed an essay to The Good Immigrant USA (2019), a "collection of essays exploring what it's like to be othered in an increasingly divided America".

=== Film career ===
Oyéjidé co-directed the short documentary film After Migration: Calabria (2019) with Jake Saner. The short follows both a boy who left his home in The Gambia and a Nigerian single mother who birthed her child in a refugee camp, whom are settling in Calabria, Italy. The short aims to subvert common narratives surrounding subjects of irregular migration. In 2023, a second short film directed by Oyéjidé titled Do You See Me was released.

In 2023, the drama film Bravo, Burkina! was released, which Oyéjidé directed, wrote, edited and produced. The film follows a homesick Burkinabé boy named Aimé who migrated to Italy. The film had its African premiere at the 2023 FESPACO film festival, for which it served as the opening film.

== Media ==
Oyéjidé has appeared on the public television series Articulate in 2015.

== Personal life ==
Oyéjidé is married and has one daughter.
