= Yahzarah =

American singer-songwriter

- Also known as: Purple St. James, Yahzarah Oduro
- Born: Dana Nicole Amma Williams; June 24, 1978 (age 48)
- Origin: Washington D.C.
- Genres: R&B; soft rock
- Occupation: Singer-songwriter
- Instrument: voice
- Years active: 1999–present
- Labels: +F.E. Music; Three Keys Music
- Website: yahzarah.com

Dana Nicole Amma Williams (born June 24, 1978), known professionally as YahZarah, is an American singer.

In 2000, she began her career as a background singer for Erykah Badu. Through several independent record labels, she has released a series of studio albums: Hear Me (2000), Blackstar (2003), The Ballad of Purple St. James (2010), and The Ceremony (2021). Throughout her career, she has also toured as background vocalist for Lenny Kravitz and Madonna.

== Early life ==
Dana Williams was born to Ghanaian activist and owner of the "Sporting News" Thomas Kojo Oduro-Kwarteng and Beverly Brown and then adopted by her stepfather Clarence Williams and raised partly in Germany and Washington D.C.. Williams started singing at the age of seven in her church choir. Her love for music began after winning the National Postal Service Arts and Talent search at the Kennedy Center at the age of ten. After years of honing her talent in churches, talent shows, and local concerts, she entered high school at Washington D.C.'s Duke Ellington School of the Arts. After graduating in 1998, she attended North Carolina Central University in Durham, where she received a full scholarship in the school's jazz program.

== Musical career ==
She adopted the name "Yahzarah", as a tribute to her grandmothers Yaa Asantewaa and Sarah. In 2000, Yahzarah received her break into the recording industry by singing back-up vocals for Erykah Badu for three years. Yahzarah also appeared in Badu's Bag Lady music video. Later in 2000, Yahzarah toured with Erykah Badu as the opening act for Badu's "Mama's Gun World Tour".

In 2000, Yahzarah released her first album, Hear Me on Keo Music. In 2003, Yahzarah released her second album Blackstar on Three Keys Music, which reached #44 on Billboard's Top R&B/Hip Hop Albums chart. The album spawned the single "Wishing". She left Three Keys Music and signed to +FE Music.

In 2005, Yahzarah featured "Sincere" from the Foreign Exchange's Connected album. In 2008, she released an extended play, entitled "The Prelude", on the +FE Music recording label. Yahzarah later appeared on the Little Brother album The Minstrel Show. Later that year, Yahzarah performed as the opening act on the Anthony Hamilton "Playing it Cool Tour" which was featured at the House of Blues. She is also featured on the album Leave It All Behind by The Foreign Exchange.

In January 2010, Yahzarah released a single "The Tickler", followed by "Why Dontcha Call Me No More" in March 2010. The music video for the latter was released on May 19, 2010. On May 4, 2010, she released her album The Ballad of Purple St. James. The album charted at #75 on Billboard's Top R&B/Hip-Hop chart. On September 18, 2010, Yahzarah announced that she will be touring with The Roots and Q-Tip on the 2010 Hennesy Artistry Tour. Yahzarah also made a cameo on the tune "I Remember" by Wes Felton on his album Land of Sheep, Ran by Pigs, Ruled by Wolves. In July 2011, Yahzarah released the video for her single "Love Come Save the Day".

In 2012, Yahzarah began her Tribute to the Beatles Tour. In 2014, she toured as a backup vocalist for Lenny Kravitz's Strut Tour in Europe. In January 2017, she released a single "Running". In 2019, she toured as a backing vocalist for Madonna during her Madame X Tour. In 2021, she released the album The Ceremony.

== Influences ==
Williams has been influenced by singers such as Prince, Stevie Wonder, and Erykah Badu. In an interview with The Couch Sessions, she named Tina Turner, Grace Jones, Diana Ross, Minnie Ripperton, and Mahalia Jackson as the five singers who shaped her into the person she is today. Although Yahzarah has done many R&B influenced songs, her primary musical style is heavily influenced by elements of electronic soul and rock.

== Personal life ==
In 2011, Williams gave birth to her first son, Miles.

== Discography ==
Albums

- Hear Me (2000)
- Blackstar (2003)
- The Ballad of Purple St. James (2010)
- The Ceremony (2021)

EPs

- The Prelude (2008)

Singles

- "Wishing" (2003)
- "Blackstar"(2003)
- "One Day" (2004)
- "Sincere" (2005, with Phonte)
- "Where I Is" (2008)
- "Orbit" (2008)
- "The Tickler" (2010)
- "Why Dontcha Call Me No More" (2010)
- "What Do Lonely Do at Christmas" (2011)
- "Running" (2017)

== Tours ==
- Mama's Gun World Tour (opening act for Erykah Badu) (2000)
- Playing It Cool Tour (opening act for Anthony Hamilton) (2008)
- The Hennesy Artistry Tour (2010)
- Tribute to Prince Tour (2011)
- Tribute to the Beatles Tour (2012–13)
- Strut Tour (with Lenny Kravitz) (2015)
- Madame X Tour (with Madonna) (2019)

== Awards and nominations ==
Year	Nominee / work	Award	Result
2009	Yahzarah	Soultracks Readers' Choice Award: Female Vocalist of the Year	Nominated
2010	The Ballad of Purple St. James	Soultracks Readers' Choice Award: Independent Album of the Year	Nominated
2010	"Why Dontcha Call Me No More"	Soultracks Readers' Choice Award: Song of the Year	Nominated
2010	Yahzarah	Soultracks Readers' Choice Award: Female Vocalist of the Year	Won
