= Leave It All Behind =

Studio album by the Foreign Exchange
- Released: October 14, 2008
- Length: 44:07
- Label: The Foreign Exchange Music; Hardboiled
- Producer: Nicolay

The Foreign Exchange chronology
Connected (2004)	Leave It All Behind (2008)	Authenticity (2010)

Leave It All Behind is the second studio album by musical duo the Foreign Exchange. It was released on October 14, 2008 via the Foreign Exchange Music and Hardboiled LLC. Production was handled entirely by member Nicolay. In the United States, the album peaked at number 68 on the Top R&B/Hip-Hop Albums and number 13 on the Heatseekers Albums charts. The song "Daykeeper" off of the album received a Grammy Award for Best Urban/Alternative Performance nomination at the 52nd Annual Grammy Awards.

== Critical reception ==
Professional ratings
Aggregate scores
Source	Rating
Metacritic	82/100
Review scores
Source	Rating
AllMusic	5/5 stars
HipHopDX	3.5/5
Pitchfork	7.5/10
PopMatters	9/10
Prefix	8/10
RapReviews	7/10
The A.V. Club	C+

Leave It All Behind was met with universal acclaim from music critics. At Metacritic, which assigns a normalized rating out of 100 to reviews from mainstream publications, the album received an average score of 82 based on five reviews.

AllMusic's Andy Kellman praised the album, calling it "a concise and complete set of songs that brings out the best of both producer Nicolay and Phonte". Andrew Martin of PopMatters declared that "this talented duo has made one hell of an album, actually one of the best of 2008, in the process". Norman Mayers of Prefix wrote: "with electronic and live sounds, emotional production and excellent vocals from some of the underground scene's best, Leave It All Behind is an open and experimental take on hip-hop and soul, highly successful, at that". Ian Cohen of Pitchfork stated: "musically, Nicolay's in his comfort zone, making the sort of album he'd been more or less heading towards since Connected, an album that, while certainly rooted in hip-hop, knocked like a pillow fight".

In his mixed review for The A.V. Club, Nathan Rabin noted: "Nicolay has never been afraid to go soft and smooth, but his production on Leave It sometimes borders on easy listening".

== Track listing ==
No.	Title	Writer(s)	Length
1.	"Daykeeper"	Phonte Coleman; Matthijs Rook	4:41
2.	"Take Off the Blues"	Coleman; Rook	4:06
3.	"All or Nothing/Coming Home to You"	Coleman; Darien Brockington; Rook	4:54
4.	"I Wanna Know"	Coleman; Rook	3:01
5.	"House of Cards"	Coleman; Rook	3:19
6.	"Sweeter Than You"	Coleman; Rook	3:46
7.	"Valediction"	Coleman; Rook	2:01
8.	"If She Breaks Your Heart"	Stevie Wonder	5:20
9.	"If This Is Love"	Coleman; Rook	4:30
10.	"Something to Behold"	Coleman; Brockington; Muhsinah Abdul-Karim; Rook	4:52
11.	"Leave It All Behind"	Coleman; Rook	3:37
Total length:			44:07

== Charts ==
Chart (2008)	Peak position
US Top R&B/Hip-Hop Albums (Billboard)	68
US Heatseekers Albums (Billboard)	13
