= Interdependent Media =

- Founded: 2005
- Genre: Hip hop
- Country of origin: US
- Official website: http://www.imculture.com/

Interdependent Media (also referred to as "iM" or "iM Culture") is a U.S. independent record label based in Oakland, California.

== History ==
iM was founded by MC/producer Evan Phillips (stage name Truthlive) with the help of his brother, Kyle Phillips, and father, Jethren Phillips, in late 2005. The companies musical projects are currently distributed by Fontana/Universal.

Interdependent Media is part of a Bay Area entertainment collective/building called "The Zoo."

Interdependent Media artists have worked with notable hip hop artists such as; Hieroglyphics, DJ Premier, Jake One, J Dilla, Black Milk, 88 Keys, Blu, Mos Def, Damian Marley, Little Brother, Blackalicious, Ras Kass, Planet Asia, Souls Of Mischief, Questlove, and more.

== Artists ==
- K'Naan
- J Davey
- Tanya Morgan
- Shaya
- Eyezon
- Truthlive
- Windimoto
- Finale
- Sin
- Canibus
- Note: Artists are from Interdependent Media's website.
