= Frank Stasio =

American radio journalist

- Born: Buffalo, New York, U.S.
- Presenting career
- Show: The State of Things
- Stations: WUNC 91.5 Chapel Hill; WRQM 90.9 Rocky Mount; WUND-FM 88.9 Manteo
- Network: North Carolina Public Radio
- Time slot: Noon
- Style: Host
- Country: United States
- Website: www.stateofthings.org

Frank Stasio is an American talk radio host. He hosted The State of Things on North Carolina Public Radio for many years, retiring at the end of December, 2020. Prior to The State of Things, Stasio worked for National Public Radio on All Things Considered as an associate producer and as a newscaster, and on Talk of the Nation as a guest host, as well as hosting special news coverage. He is still listed as a freelance reporter and substitute host on the NPR website.

Stasio earned his BA in mass communications from State University College at Buffalo and worked in Buffalo and in Iowa before joining NPR.
