= The Foreign Exchange =

American hip hop group

- Origin: Raleigh, North Carolina, U.S. (Phonte); Utrecht, Netherlands (Nicolay)
- Genres: R&B; electronica; hip hop; neo soul
- Instruments: Vocals; keyboard; bass guitar; acoustic guitar; lead guitar
- Years active: 2002–present
- Label: +FE Music
- Members: Phonte; Nicolay
- Website: The Foreign Exchange

The Foreign Exchange is music duo consisting of the American rapper Phonte and the Dutch record producer Nicolay. Their music is a blend of hip hop, soul, R&B and electronica.

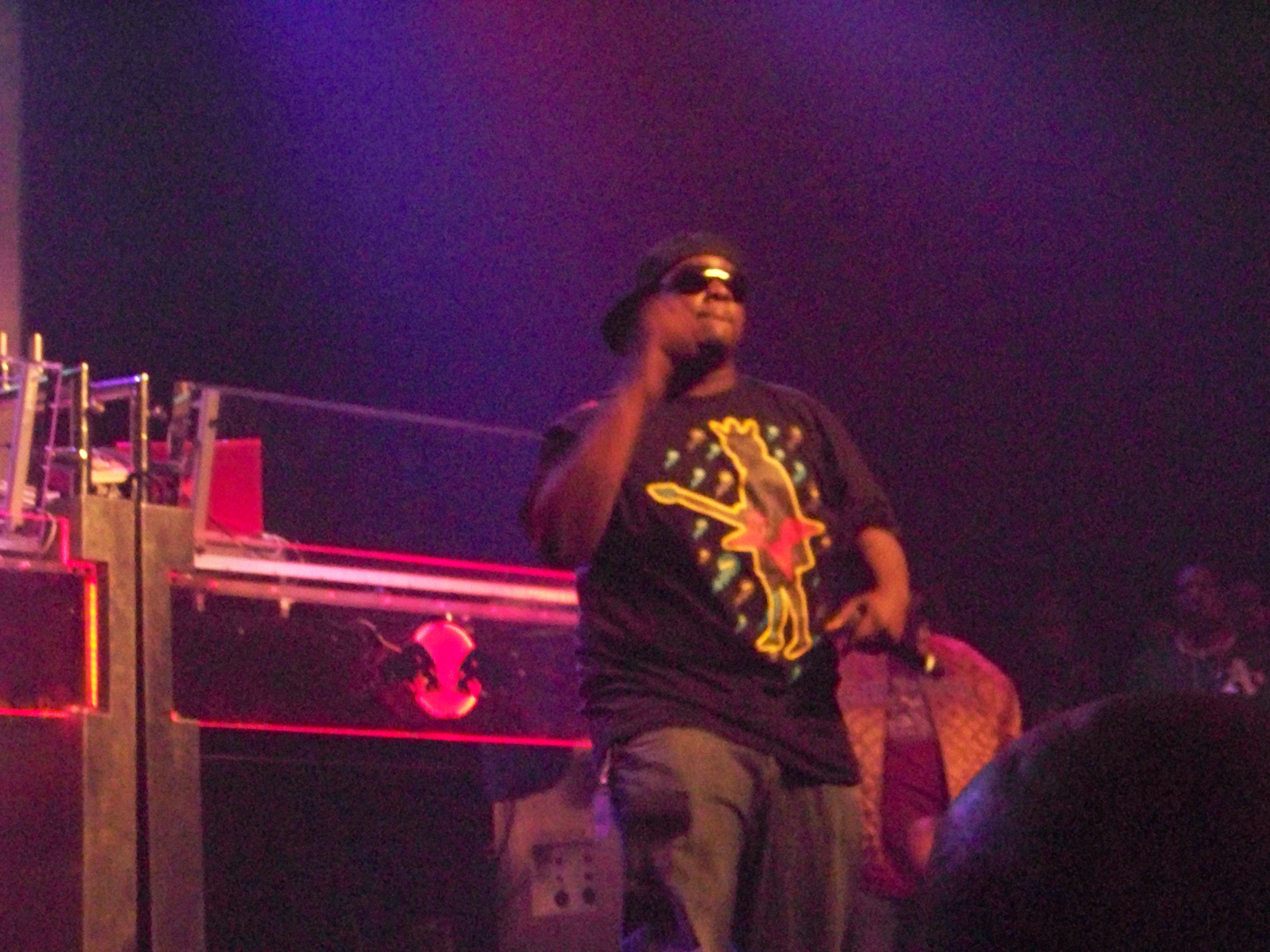
The Foreign Exchange

== Musical career ==
The pair initially made contact via message boards on Okayplayer.com and soon began recording and exchanging music. Soon after, they formed The Foreign Exchange without having ever met each other in person, hence the name. Their album, Connected, was released in 2004 and was a showcase for Nicolay's musical talents as well as an introduction to like-minded Little Brother affiliates who contributed to the album. The album received strong reviews and the single, "Sincere", featuring YahZarah, was released with a music video directed by Joey Boukadakis.

In October 2008, the duo released their second album Leave It All Behind.

In June 2009, the group announced that Zo! is now an official artist on The Foreign Exchange Music imprint and, in November 2009, YahZarah also joined the imprint. Median and Darien Brockington later joined.

In December 2009, the group were nominated for a Grammy Award, for Best Urban/Alternative Performance for the track "Daykeeper" (feat. Muhsinah) from their Leave It All Behind album.

The group's third album, Authenticity, was released on October 12, 2010. In January 2011, the duo went on tour with Sy Smith and Darien Brockington. In June 2011, the group announced their first live album, Dear Friends: An Evening with the Foreign Exchange, which includes appearances by Sy Smith and Jeanne Jolly. In September 2017, the group released their first compilation album, Hide&Seek.

== Discography ==
=== Studio albums ===
- 2004: Connected
- 2008: Leave It All Behind (#68 US R&B)
- 2010: Authenticity (#145 US; No. 23 US R&B)
- 2013: Love in Flying Colors (#115 US; No. 22 US R&B)
- 2015: Tales from the Land of Milk and Honey (#12 US R&B)
- 2017: Hide&Seek

=== Singles ===
- 2004: "Sincere" (feat. Yahzarah)
- 2008: "Daykeeper" (feat. Muhsinah)
- 2009: "Take Off the Blues"
- 2009: "House of Cards"
- 2009: "I Wanna Know"
- 2010: "Maybe She'll Dream of Me"
- 2011: "Laughing at Your Plans" (feat. Sy Smith & Jeanne Jolly)
- 2013: "Call It Home"
- 2014: "Dreams Are Made For Two" (feat. Carlitta Durand)
- 2015: "Asking for a Friend"
- 2018: "June"

== Foreign Exchange Music ==
Foreign Exchange Music
- Founded: 2008
- Founder: Phonte; Nicolay
- Status: Active
- Distributors: E1 Music (2008–2011); Empire Distribution (2011–present)
- Genre: R&B, hip-hop, neo soul
- Country of origin: United States
- Location: Wilmington, North Carolina

Foreign Exchange Music (often abbreviated as +FE Music) is a record label founded by The Foreign Exchange members Phonte and Nicolay. The label was first started for the release of their second album Leave It All Behind. Originally created for the release of their own music, the label has since issued albums for other acts.

=== Roster ===
Current

- The Foreign Exchange (2008-present)
- Phonte (2011-present)
- Nicolay (2009-present)
- Zo! (2010-present)
- BeMyFiasco (2021-present)
- Sy Smith (2024-present)
- Darien Brockington (2024-present)
- Carlitta Durand (2024-present)

Producers

- Nicolay
- Zo!

Former

- YahZarah (2010)
- Median (2011, in collaboration with Jamla Records)
- Jeanne Jolly (2011-12)
