= Connected (The Foreign Exchange album) =

Studio album by the Foreign Exchange
- Released: August 24, 2004
- Genre: Hip hop
- Length: 63:09
- Label: BBE
- Producer: Nicolay

The Foreign Exchange chronology
Connected (2004)	Leave It All Behind (2008)

Singles from Connected
- 1. "Sincere / Come Around / Raw Life" Released: 2004

Professional ratings
Review scores
Source	Rating
AllMusic	4/5 stars
The A.V. Club	favorable
Dusted Magazine	favorable
Exclaim!	favorable
Pitchfork	8.6/10
PopMatters	8/10 stars
RapReviews.com	7/10

Connected is the first studio album by the Foreign Exchange, a hip hop group consisting of American rapper Phonte from Little Brother and Dutch producer Nicolay. It was released on BBE on August 24, 2004.

Their group name comes from how they produced their songs: Nicolay would produce a beat in the Netherlands and send the beat to Phonte through instant messaging, email, and traditional mail to lay down the vocals. Phonte would return the product, so Nicolay could then master the track; they did not meet until after the album was completed.

Pitchfork placed it at number 22 on the "Top 50 Albums of 2004" list. In 2015, it was ranked at number 86 on Fact's "100 Best Indie Hip-Hop Records of All Time" list.

== Track listing ==
No.	Title	Length
1.	"Foreign Exchange Title Theme"	2:28
2.	"Von Sees"	2:11
3.	"Raw Life"	4:48
4.	"Hustle Hustle"	3:39
5.	"Let's Move"	3:55
6.	"Nic's Groove"	5:37
7.	"Be Alright"	4:16
8.	"Sincere"	4:47
9.	"Brave New World"	4:58
10.	"The Answer"	4:39
11.	"Come Around"	4:01
12.	"Happiness"	4:42
13.	"Foreign Exchange End Theme"	2:01
14.	"All That You Are"	4:33
15.	"Be Alright (Nicolay's Easybreezy Sunday Afternoon Remix)"	3:04
16.	"Call"	2:45
17.	"Downtime (Nicky Troutman's Bounce to the Ounce Remix)"	2:55

== Personnel ==
- Phonte – vocals
- Nicolay – production
- Yahzarah – vocals (on "Foreign Exchange Title Theme", "Sincere", and "End Theme")
- Von Pea – vocals (on "Von Sees")
- Joe Scudda – vocals (on "Raw Life")
- Quartermaine – vocals (on "Hustle, Hustle")
- C.A.L.I.B.E.R. – vocals (on "Hustle, Hustle")
- Rapper Big Pooh – vocals (on "Let's Move", "Nic's Groove", and "Happiness")
- Median – vocals (on "Be Alright" and "All That You Are")
- Frank Ford – vocals (on "Be Alright")
- Kenn Starr – vocals (on "The Answer")
- Oddisee – vocals (on "The Answer")
- Sean Boog – vocals (on "The Answer")
- Darien Brockington – vocals (on "Come Around", "All That You Are", and "Call")
