= Sy Smith =

American singer (born 1974)

- Also known as: Syretha Smith
- Born: February 18, 1974 (age 52); New York, U.S.
- Genres: R&B
- Occupations: Singer; songwriter; producer
- Instruments: Voice; keyboard; synth bass
- Years active: 1999–present
- Label: Psyko! Records/MDI Distribution
- Website: sysmith.com

Sy Smith (born February 18, 1974) is an American R&B singer.

== Early life and career beginnings ==
Born in New York, Smith grew up in Washington, D.C. She began her career leading a six-person Washington D.C. go-go band called "In Tyme". After graduating from Howard University with a bachelor's degree of Science in psychology and a minor in music therapy, she moved to Los Angeles, California. She soon charted territory singing backup for Usher, Eric Benet, Me'Shell NdegeOcello, Ginuwine, Brandy, and spending more than a year on the road with Whitney Houston. Among it all, Smith made appearances as a regular fixture behind Vonda Shepard on the FOX TV show Ally McBeal.

== Career ==
=== 1999–2003: Psykosoul and departure from Hollywood Records ===
Smith moved to Los Angeles in 1997 and signed with Disney's label Hollywood Records in 1999. On October 26, 1999, she released her first single "Gladly", which charted at number 79 on the Hot R&B/Hip-Hop Songs chart. In early 2000, Smith released the second single "Good N Strong". The album psykosoul was released in 2000.

In 2001, Smith was dropped from Hollywood Records. In the same year, Smith made a cameo appearance in All About You as the restaurant singer. She has since written for Santana, sung backup for Whitney Houston and with Vonda Shepard on "Ally McBeal". After talking to the proprietors of a coffee shop in Los Angeles' Leimert Park neighborhood, Smith established B!tchcraft in 2001. The monthly showcase ran for nearly two years. The showcase featured three to four female acts, unsigned and signed singers, and comedians. Between releases, Smith served as a temporary lead session singer for British funk group The Brand New Heavies on their album We Won't Stop. In 2001, Smith released a single "Welcome Back (All My Soulmates)", which later received an Emmy nomination for "Outstanding Music and Lyrics". In 2002, she released her extended play One Like Me.

=== 2004–2007: The Syberspace Social ===
In 2004, Smith received a minor role in The Seat Filler as Fitz (VJ). Smith also signed a recording contract with Kajmere Records and began recording her second album in 2004. Later that year, Smith starred as Rose in the independent film Black Rose. In early 2005, Smith began her own recording company, Psyko! Inc. In early 2005, Smith released a single "Fa'Sho". In September 2005. Smith released her second album, The Syberspace Social. The album featured contributions from R&B singer Anthony Hamilton and producers such as James Poyser and Victor Duplaix. In December 2005, Smith released a deluxe edition of her first album entitled, Psykosoul Plus, which contained three additional songs. In the same year, she also appeared in the theatre If You Don't Believe: A Love Story. She received an NAACP Theatre Award nomination for Best Supporting Female – Local.

Smith, along with Sharlotte Gibson and Kenya Hathaway, were featured backup singers on American Idol.

Smith also appeared on The Article 3, a 2006 EP release from bass guitar impresario Me'Shell NdegeOcello in addition to opening for the artist. In mid-2006, Smith recorded a single "Fill in the Blanks", which was featured on the Airpushers' Themes for the Ordinarily Strange. In 2006, Smith released a deluxe edition of her second album, The Syberspace Social. The album featured two additional songs. While embarking on her tour in 2006, Sy Smith released her first live DVD Sy Smith Live: Worship At The Temple, recorded live at Temple Bar in Santa Monica, California. She also appeared in the theatre Body Language in the supporting role "Holt". She received an NAACP Theatre Award nomination for Best Supporting Female – Local.

=== 2007–2009: Conflict ===
In April 2008, Smith released her third studio album, Conflict, with "Fly Away With Me" as the lead single. The song "Fly Away With Me" charted at number 38 on the Top 40 Hot Adult R&B Chart. In late 2008, Smith's album Conflict received an "Album of the Year" nomination from Soultracks. In 2009, she made a guest performance at the Live in Boston show of Chris Botti where she sang the Burt Bacharach classic "The Look of Love". She also features on the DVD release of this concert and is seen in his tour in Europe. Sy Smith also serves as the voice role of Aisha in the Saints Row video game series, recording three tracks as the character for the games' soundtracks.

=== 2010–2011: Syberselects ===
In April 2010, Smith appeared on The Mo'Nique Show to perform her single "Fly Away With Me" and promote her album Conflict. She later announced that she was planning to release a new project in 2010. In July 2010, Smith went on tour with Mark de Clive-Lowe. In mid-August 2010, Smith released a single "Truth" to iTunes. In October 2010, Smith received a Soultrack Readers Choice Award "Song of the Year" nomination for her song "Greatest Weapon of all Time". On October 26, 2010, Smith released her best of album, SyberSelects: A Collection of Sy Smith Favorites.

In December 2010, Smith confirmed in an interview, that she will be doing a jazz album.

In January 2011, Sy Smith and Mark de Clive-Lowe recorded a version of Teena Marie's 1984 hit "Lovergirl" and went on the tour with The Foreign Exchange.

=== 2011–2015: Fast and Curious ===
In November 2011, Smith began touring with Sheila E. and the E Family. In December 2011, Smith announced her fourth album, Fast and Curious to be released on March 6, 2012.

In January 2012, Smith and The Decorders released a remake of Minnie Riperton's song "Inside My Love". On March 6, 2012, Smith released her fourth studio album Fast and Curious. She regularly appears as a guest soloist on tour dates for trumpeter Chris Botti. In 2013, she performed regularly as a supporting vocalist for French musical icon Johnny Hallyday. Smith also re-joined Chris Botti as the featured vocalist for his tour.

In September 2015, Smith released a cover version of Janet Jackson's "When I Think of You".

=== 2016–present: further albums ===
Smith's fifth album, Sometimes a Rose Will Grow in Concrete, was released in February 2018. Smith released her sixth studio album, Until We Meet Again, in 2024.

In 2022 Smith led a tribute to jazz music in the neighborhood of South Los Angeles's Central Avenue.

== Discography ==
Studio albums

- Psykosoul (2000)
- The Syberspace Social (2005)
- Conflict (2008)
- Fast and Curious (2012)
- Sometimes a Rose Will Grow in Concrete (2018)
- Until We Meet Again (2024)

== Filmography ==
=== Music videos ===
Year	Title	Album
2005	"Fa' Sho"	The Syberspace Social
2008	"Conflict (This Is Your Brain On Drugs)"	Conflict
2008	"Fly Away With Me"	Conflict
2008	"B-Side Love Affair"	Conflict
2008	"The Art of You"	Conflict
2008	"Spies"	Conflict
2010	"Truth"	Fast and Curious
2012	"Nights (Feel Like Getting Down)"	Fast and Curious
2018	"Now and Later"	Sometimes A Rose Will Grow in Concrete
2018	"Perspective"	Sometimes A Rose Will Grow in Concrete
2020	"Camelot"	Sometimes A Rose Will Grow in Concrete
2020	"Sometimes a Rose Will Grow in Concrete"	Sometimes A Rose Will Grow in Concrete
2021	"Feeling Good"	Non-album track
2024	"Why Do You Keep Calling Me"	Until We Meet Again

=== Film and stage ===
Year	Title	Role	Notes
2001	All About You	Toomie's singer	Cameo appearance
2004	Black Rose	Rose	Lead role
2004	The Seat Filler	Fitz (VJ)	Minor role
2005	If You Don't Believe: A Love Story	Ellie Jackson	Minor role
2006	True Grits	Pregnant woman	Minor role
2006	Body Language	Holt	Minor role
2016	California Love – A Triptych	Herself	Main role

=== Television ===
Year	Title	Role	Notes
1997–2002	Ally McBeal	Singer 1	41 episodes
2002	Lyric Cafe	Herself	Music director
2011	American Dad!	The Hot Tub Singers (voice)	Episode: "Hot Water"
2011–2012	How I Met Your Mother	Singer	Episodes: "Tick Tick Tick" and "The Autumn of Break-Ups"
2023	Young Love	Ms. Anderson (voice)	4 episodes

=== Video games ===
Year	Title	Role	Notes
2006	Saints Row	Aisha	Voice
2008	Saints Row 2	Aisha	Voice

== Awards and nominations ==
Year	Nominee / work	Award	Result
2001	"Welcome Back"	Primetime Emmy Awards: Outstanding Music and Lyrics	Nominated
2005	If You Don't Believe: A Love Story	NAACP Theatre Awards: Best Supporting Female – Local	Nominated
2006	Body Language	NAACP Theatre Awards: Best Supporting Female – Local	Nominated
2008	Conflict	Soultracks Reader's Choice Award: Album of the Year	Nominated
2008	Sy Smith	Soultracks Reader's Choice Award: Female Vocalist of the Year	Nominated
2009	Sy Smith	LA Weekly Music Awards: Best Contemporary Blues/R&B Artist	Nominated
2010	"Greatest Weapon of All Time"	Soultracks Reader's Choice Award: Song of the Year	Nominated
2012	Sy Smith	Soultracks Reader's Choice Award: Female Vocalist of the Year	Nominated
2012	Fast and Curious	Soultracks Reader's Choice Award: Independent Album of the Year	Nominated
2012	"Nights (Feel Like Gettin' Down)"	Soultracks Reader's Choice Award: Song of the Year	Nominated
