= The State of Things (radio show) =

- Genre: Talk show
- Running time: 1 hour
- Country of origin: United States
- Home station: WUNC-FM
- Hosted by: Frank Stasio
- Original release: 2004 – 2020
- Opening theme: composed by Django Haskins
- Website: The State of Things
- Podcast: The State of Things

The State of Things was a radio talk show produced by North Carolina Public Radio. The show aired live at 12 noon Eastern time Monday through Friday, and was rebroadcast Monday through Thursday at 8 PM. Linda Belans founded and hosted the program from 1996 - 1999, Frank Stasio hosted from June 2006 through his retirement in November 2020, and Anita Rao hosted through the show's finale in December 2020. The show concentrated on topics of interest in North Carolina.

== Format ==
The program was divided into three segments spanning the show's hour-long timeslot. While segments generally focus on different topics, some shows may devote two or more segments to a single topic.

=== Segment A ===
This portion of the show ran for 12 minutes and typically deals with a recent news item of particular importance to the state. Some examples include:

- The start of a NOAA research expedition to explore sunken German U-boats off the North Carolina coast. ("Preserving the Graveyard of the Atlantic")
- An announcement by Wake Forest University that applicants will no longer be required to submit SAT or ACT scores. ("Wake drops SAT, ACT")
- The launch of an ad campaign calling attention to alleged abusive labor practices at Smithfield Foods. ("Smithfield Justice Ad Campaign")

=== Segment B ===
This was the longest portion of the show, clocking in at 20 minutes. Because of the extra time, topics chosen for this segment often warrant deeper exploration and discussion by host and guests. Some examples include:

- A retrospective talk with former UNC Chancellor James Moeser. ("A Conversation With the Chancellor")
- A new publishing house's effort to inject life into Durham's literary scene ("Bull City Lit")

=== Segment C ===
The last segment of the show ran 17-and-a-half minutes. Frequently, topics chosen for this segment are more arts-centered than A or B segments, though the staff occasionally chooses to examine an off-beat or unusual topic during this timeslot. Some examples include:

- A comic "klatch" involving a group of North Carolina comic-strip authors who publish their work on the Internet. ("WebComic Coffee Klatch")
- Playwrights from a drama festival in Carrboro sharing the secrets of writing a short play. ("Ten By Ten in the Triangle")
- A look at a new novel in the Southern magic-realist genre. ("The Sugar Queen")

== Participation ==
The show accepted both telephone calls and e-mails during the live broadcast. Listeners are also encouraged to submit ideas for future segments.
