= Nicolay (musician) =

Dutch record producer (born 1974)

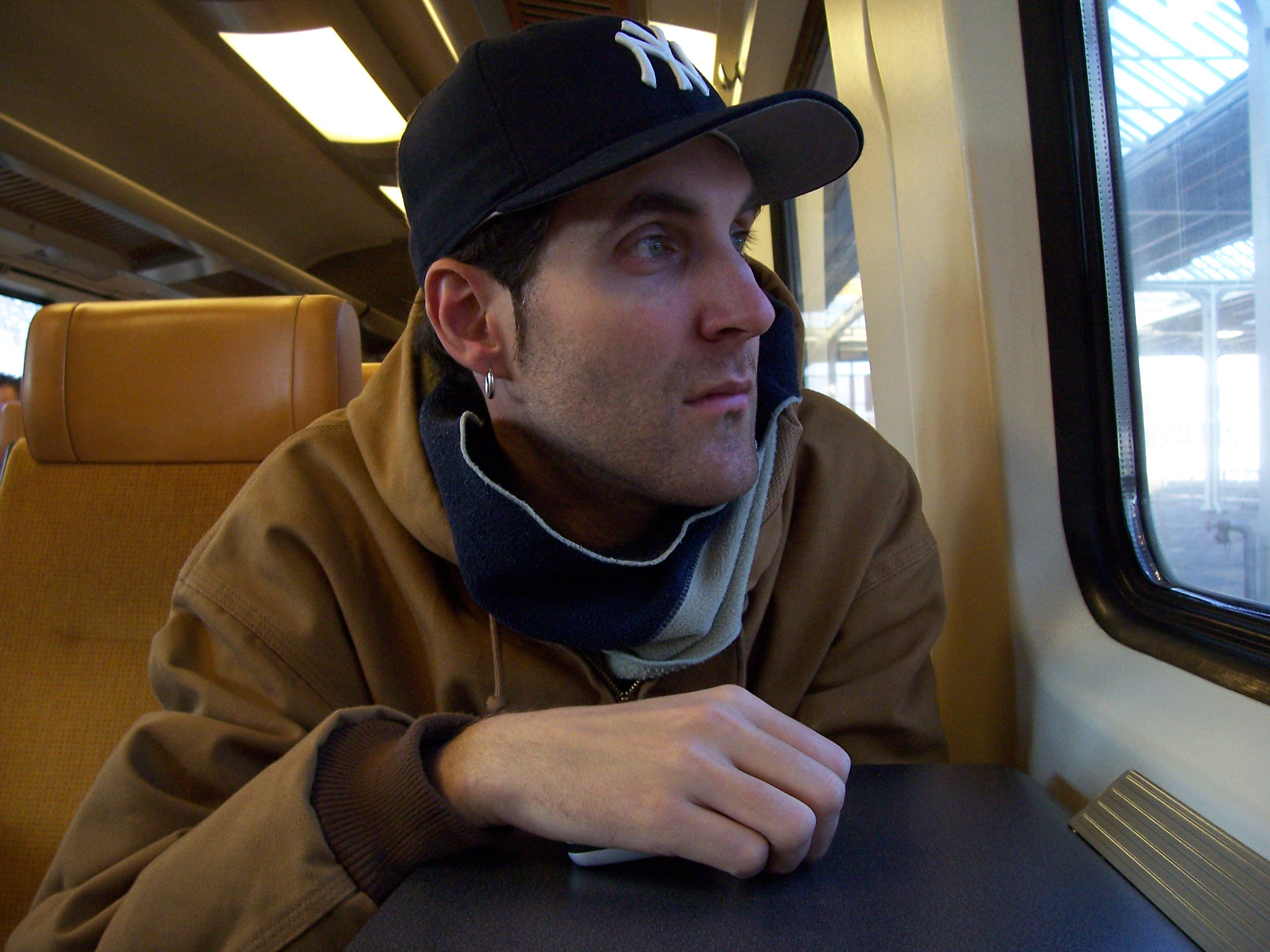

Background information
- Born: Matthijs Rook; November 30, 1972 (age 53); Zwijndrecht, Netherlands
- Origin: Utrecht, Netherlands
- Genres: Soul, electronic, instrumental, hip-hop
- Occupations: Producer, musician
- Instruments: keys, guitar, bass, Pro Tools
- Years active: 2000– present
- Label: The Foreign Exchange Music
- Website: www.nicolaymusic.com

Nicolay (birth name, Matthijs Rook) (born 30 November 1972) is a neo-soul and hip-hop musician, composer, and record producer from the Netherlands. He is most well-known as half of the European hip-hop duo The Foreign Exchange (the other half of the duo being Phonte Coleman).

Nicolay had been considering living in the United States to work on his music when he met his future wife, Aimee Flint (who, like his musical partner Phonte, was from North Carolina), through mutual acquaintances. He moved from Utrecht, Holland to the United States in 2006. Nicolay and Flint chose to reside in Carolina Beach, North Carolina, for a couple of years. The eventually married couple then moved to Wilmington, North Carolina, where they have remained since; there, Nicolay maintains a home studio, working on his music for several hours a day.

In December 2009, The Foreign Exchange were nominated for a Grammy, for Best Urban/Alternative Performance for the track "Daykeeper," from their second album, Leave It All Behind. Nicolay was only the fourth Dutch person to have been nominated.

== Discography ==
The Foreign Exchange

- Connected (2004, BBE)
- Leave It All Behind (2008, Foreign Exchange Music)
- Authenticity (2010, Foreign Exchange Music)
- Love in Flying Colors (2013, Foreign Exchange Music)
- Tales from the Land of Milk and Honey (2015, Foreign Exchange Music)

Nicolay & Kay

- TIME:LINE (EU Release: February 1, 2008 & US February 12, 2008, Nicolay Music Recordings)

Nicolay & The Hot At Nights

- Glaciers (2018, Foreign Exchange Music)

Solo

- Remix for Roy Ayers: "Funk in the Hole (Nicolay Mix)" (Roy Ayers Virgin Ubiquity Remixed) (2004, BBE)
- City Lights Vol. 1 (2005, BBE)
- Dutch Masters Mixtape V. 1 (2005, HardBoiled)
- City Lights Vol. 1.5 (2005, BBE)
- Here (2006, BBE)
- City Lights Vol. 2: Shibuya (2009, The Foreign Exchange Music)
- City Lights Vol. 3: Soweto (2015, The Foreign Exchange Music)
- Nice Chops: The Dutch Schultz Tapes (2004-2008) (2023, The Foreign Exchange Music)
- Terra Firma (2024, The Foreign Exchange Music)
- Track Sound (2025, The Foreign Exchange Music)

== Singles ==
- "I Am the Man" (2006, BBE)
- "I Love the Way You Love" (2006, BBE)
- "Lose Your Way" (2009, The Foreign Exchange Music)

== See also ==
- Dutch hip-hop
